= 1900 in Romania =

- Decades: 1880s; 1890s; 1900s; 1910s; 1920s
- See also: Other events of 1900; History of Romania; Timeline of Romanian history; Years in Romania

Events from the year 1900 in Romania. The year saw the performance of the first Romanian opera.

== Incumbents ==
- King: Carol I.
- Prime Minister:
  - Gheorghe Grigore Cantacuzino (until 7 July).
  - Petre P. Carp (from 7 July).

== Events ==
- 2 November – The first Romanian opera, Petru Rareș by Eduard Caudella is performed for the first time.

== Births ==
- 17 June – Micaela Eleutheriade, painter and engraver (died 1982).
- 4 November – Lucrețiu Pătrășcanu, politician, lawyer, sociologist and economist (died 1954).
- 24 December – Ion Valentin Anestin, graphic artist, engraver, painter and sculptor (died 1963).
