= 1950 in Romania =

- Decades: 1930s; 1940s; 1950s; 1960s; 1970s
- See also: Other events of 1950; History of Romania; Timeline of Romanian history; Years in Romania

Events from the year 1950 in Romania. The year saw Romania build relationships with other Communist states, including China and East Germany.

The regions of the Romanian People's Republic between 1950 and 1952

== Incumbents ==
- President of the Provisional Presidium of the Republic: Constantin Ion Parhon.
- Prime Minister: Petru Groza.
- General Secretary of the Romanian Communist Party: Gheorghe Gheorghiu-Dej.

== Events ==
- 13 January – Legislation legitimising labor camps is passed.
- 20 February – Romania withdraws from the World Health Organization.
- 11 March – Romania send its first ambassador to the People's Republic of China thus normalising China–Romania relations.
- 19 April – With the Decree 92, a huge number of private houses and lands are confiscated.
- 22 August – The Great National Assembly renames Brașov Orașul Stalin (Stalin City) in honour of Joseph Stalin.
- 6 September 6 – By Law nr. 5, the 58 counties (județe) — including the 424 plăși and 6,276 rural and urban communes — were abolished, being replaced by 28 regions, composed of 177 raions, 148 cities and towns, and 4,052 communes.
- 22 September – Romania signs its first commercial treaty with East Germany to export oil to the country. The country had previously supplied Nazi Germany during the Second World War but had ceased after the Allied occupation.
- 19 November – Alexandru Todea is secretly consecrated bishop of the Romanian Greek Catholic Church.

== Births ==
- 1 February – Mircea Puta, mathematician (died 2007).
- 18 March – Tudor Ratiu, mathematician.
- 9 April – Dumitru Marcu, football player and manager (died 2026)
- 14 April – Daniela Crăsnaru, poet.
- 30 April – Gheorghe Moroșanu, mathematician.
- 13 May – Sergiu Klainerman, mathematician.
- 29 July – Maricica Puică, middle-distance runner, winner of the inaugural 3,000 m at the 1984 Summer Olympics and world record-holder in 1986.
- 6 September – Eugene Sârbu, violinist (died 2024)
- 15 November – Princess Elena of Romania, daughter of King Michael I and Queen Anne of Romania.
- 6 December – Gheorghe Păun, computer scientist.

== Deaths ==
- 10 May – Vasile Aftenie, Auxiliary bishop of the Greek-Catholic Church, titular Bishop of Ulpiana, beaten to death at Văcărești Prison, beatified on 2 June 2019 (born 1899).
- 18 May – Henri Cihoski, major general during World War I and was Minister of War from 1928 to 1930, died in Sighet Prison (born 1871).
- 19 May – Daniel Ciugureanu, politician, Prime Minister of the Moldavian Democratic Republic in 1918, President of the Romanian Senate, died in Sighet Prison (born 1885).
- 25 May – Nicolae Ciupercă, lieutenant general who served in both world wars and was Minister of War from 1938 to 1939, anti-communist resistance leader, who died in Văcărești Prison (born 1882).
- 12 June – Eugen Cristescu, head of Siguranța Statului secret police and of the Secret Intelligence Service, who died in Văcărești Prison (born 1895)
- 15 June – Nicolae Macici, lieutenant general during World War II, who died in Aiud Prison (born 1886).
- 26 June – Iosif Jumanca, politician, killed by torture at Gherla Prison (born 1893).
- 30 August – Alexandru Lapedatu, historian, politician, President of the Senate of Romania, member and President of the Romanian Academy, died in Sighet Prison (born 1876).
- 3 September – Traian Vuia, aviation pioneer (born 1872).
- 16 September – Nicolae Samsonovici, Defence Minister and delegate to the Conference for the Reduction and Limitation of Armaments, who died in Sighet Prison (born 1877).
- 19 September – Constantin Eftimiu, brigadier general during World War II, Minister in the Sănătescu cabinet, anti-communist resistance leader, who died in Aiud Prison (born 1893).
- 30 December – Mihail Manoilescu, engineer, economist, journalist who served as Foreign Minister, died in Sighet Prison (born 1891).
