= 1948 in Romania =

- Decades: 1920s; 1930s; 1940s; 1950s; 1960s
- See also: Other events of 1948; History of Romania; Timeline of Romanian history; Years in Romania

Events from the year 1948 in Romania. The year saw the formalisation of the Romanian People's Republic.

== Incumbents ==
- President of the Provisional Presidium of the Republic: Constantin Ion Parhon.
- Prime Minister: Petru Groza.
- General Secretary of the Romanian Communist Party: Gheorghe Gheorghiu-Dej.

== Events ==
- 28 March – The first elections held in the Romanian People's Republic are held. The People's Democratic Front gain 93.2% of the vote.
- 13 April – A new Constitution is adopted, introducing a "people's democracy."
- 14 May – at least 10.000 innocent romanian citizens are arrested and sentenced to death or prison for life by communist authorities. The football club FC Dinamo București is founded.
- 11 June – The Great National Assembly announces the nationalization of all industry, mines, banking and transportation.
- 30 August – The Securitate (Departamentul Securității Statului, Department of State Security) is found.

== Births ==
- 17 February – Valentin Ceaușescu, physicist.
- 19 July – Argentina Menis, Olympic-medal-winning discus thrower.
- 27 July – Fred Popovici, composer
- 3 August – Ioana Tudoran, Olympic-medal-winning rower.
- 13 August – Prince Paul, claimant to the Royal House of Romania.
- 28 November – Mariana Nicolesco, operatic soprano (died 2022).

== Deaths ==
- 2 February – Smaranda Brăescu, parachuting and aviation pioneer (born 1897).
- 27 February – Nicodim, Patriarch of All Romania between 1939 and 1948 (born 1864).
- 29 February – Constantin S. Constantin, major general during World War II, he died at Văcărești Prison (born 1889).
- 5 May – Sextil Pușcariu, linguist and philologist (born 1877).
- 16 June – Mircea Damian, prose writer and journalist (born 1899).
- 22 June – Ioan Simu, Greek-Catholic priest and politician (born 1875).
- 14 September – Constantin Angelescu, Prime Minister of Romania between 30 December 1933 and 3 January 1934 (born 1869).
- 13 December – Zaharia Bârsan, playwright, poet, and actor (born 1878).
- 19 December – Ella Negruzzi, lawyer and human rights advocate (born 1876).
