= 1951 in Romania =

- Decades: 1930s; 1940s; 1950s; 1960s; 1970s
- See also: Other events of 1951; History of Romania; Timeline of Romanian history; Years in Romania

Events from the year 1951 in Romania. The year saw the Bărăgan deportations.

The regions of the Romanian People's Republic between 1950 and 1952

== Incumbents ==
- President of the Provisional Presidium of the Republic: Constantin Ion Parhon.
- Prime Minister: Petru Groza.
- General Secretary of the Romanian Communist Party: Gheorghe Gheorghiu-Dej.

== Events ==
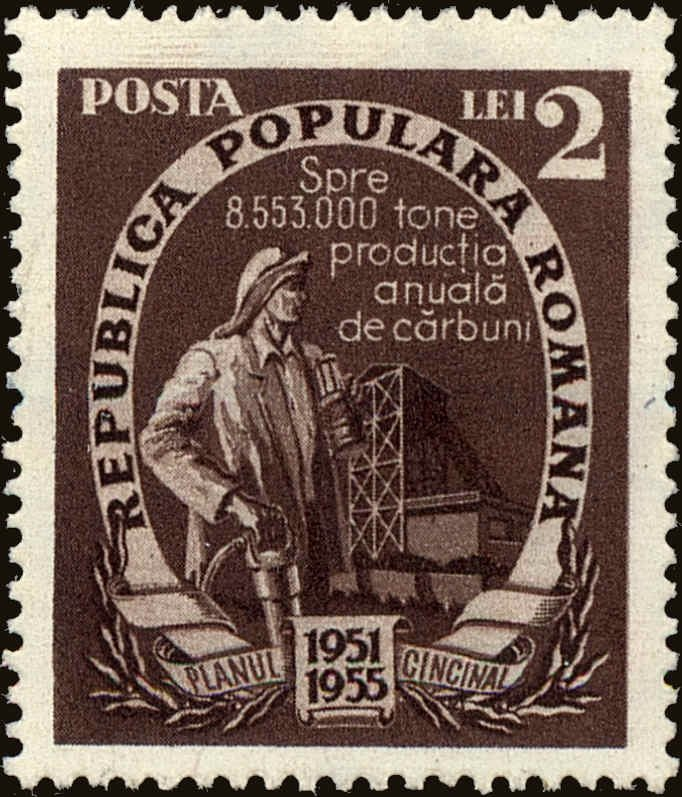
Stamp of Romania from 1951: Five-Year Plan 1951 to 1955 – Coal production

- 30 March – The Securitate is reorganised under the name Direcția Generală a Securității Statului (DGSS).
- 18 June – The Bărăgan deportations, during which 44,000 residents from Caraș-Severin, Mehedinți, and Timiș counties are deported. Of those, 2,000 die.
- 20 October – The Frederic and Cecilia Cuțescu-Storck Art Museum is opened as a public gallery.
- 15 December – The first Five-Year Plan (1951–1955) is adopted by the Great National Assembly; the main objective of the plan is the construction of the Danube–Black Sea Canal.

== Popular culture ==
- In Our Village (În sat la noi), directed by Jean Georgescu and Victor Iliu.
- Life Triumphs (Viața învinge), directed by Dinu Negreanu.

== Births ==
- 14 January – Fița Rafira, middle-distance runner, medal winner at the 1984 Summer Olympics.
- 22 July – Dan Ilie Ciobotea, the future Patriarch Daniel of Romania.
- 1 September – Nicu Ceaușescu, physicist and communist politician (died 1996).
- 4 November – Traian Băsescu, politician and former President of Romania.

== Deaths ==
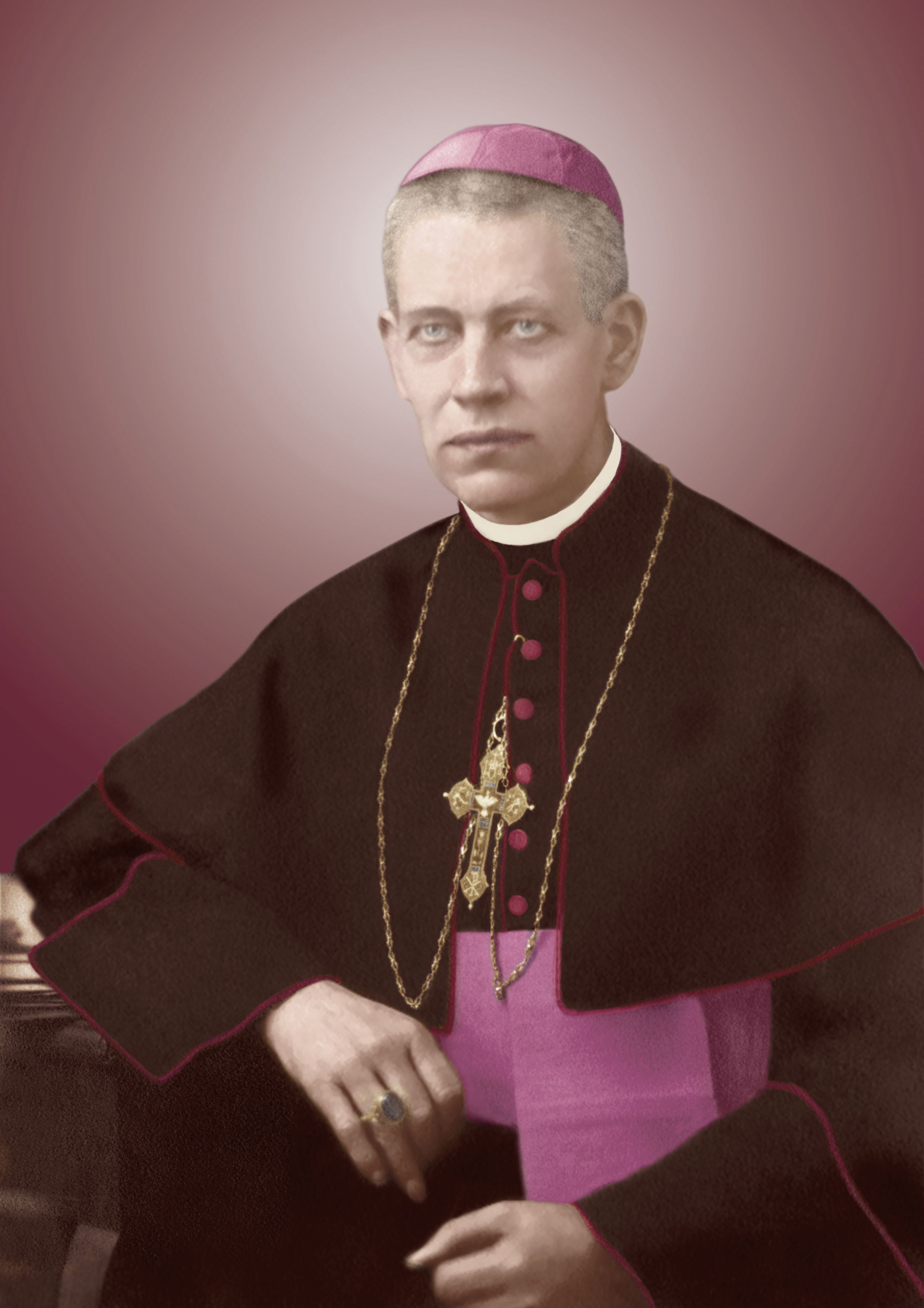
Anton Durcovici (1888–1951)

- 14 January – Tancred Constantinescu, engineer and politician, died at Sighet Prison (born 1878).
- 15 March – Gheorghe Tașcă, economist, lawyer, academic, diplomat, and politician; a corresponding member of the Romanian Academy, he died at Sighet Prison (born 1875).
- 19 April – Ion Manolescu-Strunga, politician, died at Sighet Prison (born 1889).
- 22 May – Istrate Micescu, lawyer, died in Aiud Prison (born 1881).
- 18 July – Toma Arnăuțoiu, officer who led a group of anti-communist resistance fighters from 1949 to 1958, executed at Jilava Prison (born 1921).
- 10 December – Anton Durcovici, bishop of Iași in the Roman Catholic Church and martyr, he died at Sighet Prison and was beatified on 17 May 2014 (born 1888).
