= 1953 in Romania =

- Decades: 1930s; 1940s; 1950s; 1960s; 1970s
- See also: Other events of 1953; History of Romania; Timeline of Romanian history; Years in Romania

Events from the year 1953 in Romania. The year saw the death of Carol II.

== Incumbents ==
- President of the Provisional Presidium of the Republic: Petru Groza .
- Prime Minister and General Secretary of the Romanian Communist Party: Gheorghe Gheorghiu-Dej.

== Events ==
- 9 March – The Patriarch of All Romania, Justinian, lays flowers on Joseph Stalin's tomb during the funeral of the Soviet leader.
- 17 July – Construction of the Danube–Black Sea Canal is halted. The canal had been the site of multiple executions.
- 2 August – The 4th World Festival of Youth and Students opens at the Stadionul August 23 and runs until 14 August. The event includes athletics and dance performances.
- 23 October – Romania provides $7.2 million in aid to North Korea to support reconstruction after the Korean War.

== Births ==
- 14 February – Ioan Dzițac, mathematician (died 2021).
- 5 March – Radu Berceanu, engineer and politician.
- 24 March – Sorin Popa, mathematician.
- 31 March – Maria Micșa, medal winner at the 1976 Summer Olympics in quadruple skulls.
- 12 April — Andrei Broder, computer scientist and engineer.
- 30 June — Adriana Hölszky, composer and pianist.
- 13 July – Violeta Dinescu, composer of choral music.
- 19 July – Daniela Buruiană, politician and Member of the European Parliament.
- Full date unknown
  - Baldi Olier, flamenco guitarist

== Deaths ==
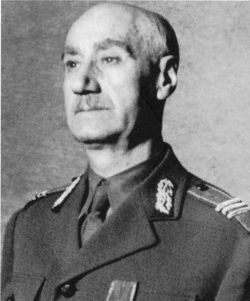
Nicolae Rădescu (1874–1953)

- 5 February – Iuliu Maniu, Romanian lawyer and politician, Prime Minister of Romania in 1928–1930 and 1932–1933, died in Sighet Prison (born 1873).
- 25 March – Ion Cămărășescu, politician, died in Sighet Prison (born 1882).
- 4 April – Carol II, King from 8 June 1930 to 6 September 1940 (born 1893).
- 23–27 April – Gheorghe I. Brătianu, politician and historian, titular member of the Romanian Academy, died in Sighet Prison (born 1898).
- 13 May – Nicolae Tătăranu, major general in World War II (born 1890).
- 16 May – Nicolae Rădescu, Prime Minister between 7 December 1944 and 1 March 1945 (born 1874).
- 7 June – Ioan Flueraș, social democratic politician, murdered at Gherla Prison (born 1882).
- 27 June – Ioan Suciu, bishop of the Greek-Catholic Church, died at Sighet Prison (born 1907).
- 4 August – Francisc Șirato, painter (born 1877).
- 5 September – Constantin Levaditi, physician and microbiologist (born 1874).
- 3 October – Szilárd Bogdánffy, auxiliary bishop of the Catholic Church, died at Aiud Prison (born 1911).
- 2 December – Radu Băldescu, major general during World War II, died at Jilava Prison (born 1888).
