= 1896 in Romania =

- Decades: 1870s; 1880s; 1890s; 1900s; 1910s
- See also: Other events of 1896; History of Romania; Timeline of Romanian history; Years in Romania

Events from the year 1896 in Romania.

== Incumbents ==
- King: Carol I.
- Prime Minister:
  - Dimitrie Sturdza (until 21 November).
  - Petre S. Aurelian (from 22 November).

== Births ==
- 28 April – Tristan Tzara, avant-garde poet and essayist (died 1963).
- 15 November – Horia Hulubei, nuclear physicist (died 1972).
- 6 December – Marcel Pauker, husband of Ana Pauker, Communist leader, executed near Moscow during the Great Purge (died 1938).
