= 1897 in Romania =

- Decades: 1870s; 1880s; 1890s; 1900s; 1910s
- See also: Other events of 1897; History of Romania; Timeline of Romanian history; Years in Romania

Events from the year 1897 in Romania.

== Incumbents ==
- King: Carol I.
- Prime Minister:
  - Petre S. Aurelian (until 26 March).
  - Dimitrie Sturdza (from 31 March).

== Events ==
- 18 April – A commercial agreement is reached between Romania and the Ottoman Empire in Constantinople.
- 16 August – Emil Racoviță departs on an expedition aboard the Norwegian research vessel Belgica as part of the Belgian Antarctic Expedition. The international team is the first to overwinter in Antarctica.

== Births ==
- 1 January – Ana Aslan, biologist, specialist in gerontology (died 1988).
- 3 January – Genica Athanasiou, actor (died 1966).
- 6 January – Ionel Teodoreanu, novellist (died 1954).
- 21 May – Smaranda Brăescu, parachuting and aviation pioneer (died 1948).
- 4 July – Costică Acsinte, photographer (died 1984).
- 8 October – Ștefan I. Nenițescu, poet (died 1979).
- 16 October – Alexandru Proca, physicist (died 1955).
- 19 October – Henrieta Delavrancea, architect (died 1987).
