= Mitzura Arghezi =

Romanian actress, illustrator, ballerina, editor and politician (1924–2015)

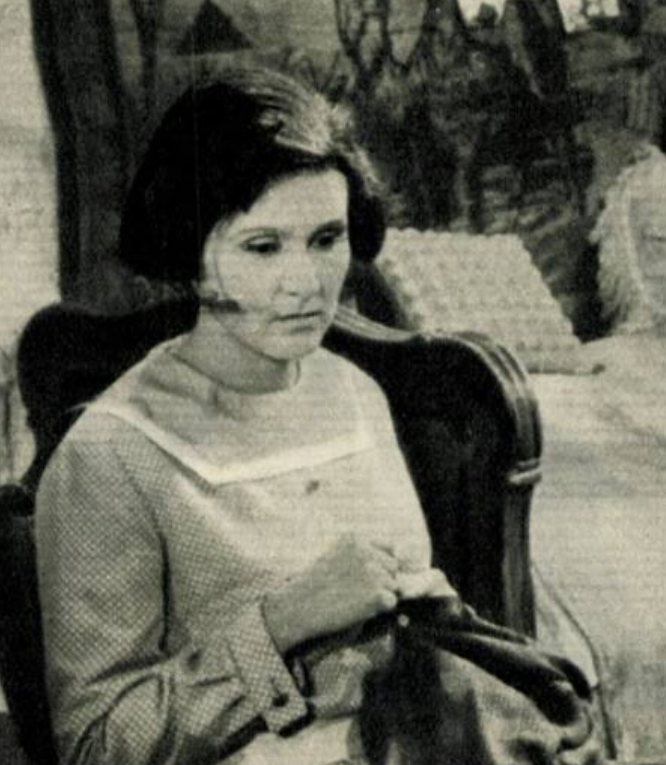
- Arghezi in Titanic Waltz
- Born: Domnica Theodorescu; 10 December 1924; Bucharest, Kingdom of Romania
- Died: 27 October 2015 (aged 90); Bucharest, Romania
- Other name: Mitzura Domnica Arghezi
- Occupations: Actress; visual artist; politician; ballerina; book editor; museum curator; radio presenter
- Years active: 1943–2015
- Spouse: 2, including Mircea Anghelescu

Mitzura Domnica Arghezi (also spelled Mițura, born Domnica Theodorescu; 10 December 1924 – 27 October 2015) was a Romanian actress, visual artist and politician, also active as a ballerina, book editor, and museum curator. She was the daughter of poet-journalist Tudor Arghezi, the sister of writer Baruțu T. Arghezi, as well as the half-sister of art photographer Eli Lotar. Her childhood was spent at Mărțișor, her father's estate in Bucharest, and became the inspiration for his children's books, which a grown-up Mitzura illustrated. She was trained in dancing by Floria Capsali, and appeared in music shows for both the National Opera and the National Theater Bucharest. During and shortly after World War II, she exhibited her work in the graphic arts, to critical acclaim. Mitzura's career in both visual arts and letters was interrupted by her family's persecution in the early stages of Romanian communism. Deemed a child "of the bourgeoisie" by Scînteia, she was forced to renounce her studies at the University of Bucharest and focus instead on becoming an actress. She graduated from the Caragiale Institute of Theater just as Arghezi Sr was undergoing rehabilitation.

Debuting on the screen with the 1951 In Our Village, Arghezi returned ten years later with a leading role in Doi vecini—based on a comedic story by her father, and marking the directorial debut of her Institute colleague Geo Saizescu. This was followed in 1964 by another substantial role, as Gena in Titanic Waltz. Though she continued to appear in films and was part of the National Theater company, from 1967 she became mainly focused on preserving her late father's legacy, and by 1975 was in charge of Mărțișor, reopened as a museum. Following Baruțu's self-exile and Lotar's death, she took full managerial control of the estate, sparking controversy with her rigid interpretation of copyright, and being accused of stealing others' research in her own work as editor of the Tudor Arghezi corpus. She was also criticized for her alleged compromises with communist governments, and, into her old age, remained adamant that Romania under socialism was preferable to the United States.

Despite being part-Székely, Arghezi was an advocate of Romanian nationalism, and repeatedly voiced suspicion toward the Hungarian minority. After the Romanian Revolution of 1989, she entered electoral politics with the Romanian National Unity Party, presenting herself in the race of September 1992. She later joined Corneliu Vadim Tudor's Greater Romania Party (PRM); for several months in 1995, she was the inaugural holder of a government secretariat channeling support for the Romanian diaspora. Arghezi was elected to the Chamber for Olt County in the general election of 1996, and reelected in 2000 (when she was also the first woman to preside over a Chamber session). Openly calling for a ban on the Democratic Alliance of Hungarians, she was also an opponent of the then-governing Romanian Democratic Convention. Arghezi defended the PRM's image as a moderate-nationalist force, expressed support for European integration, and spoke about her father's philosemitism, while remaining loyal to Vadim Tudor throughout the PRM's decline and factional splits. She died in 2015, weeks after Vadim Tudor's own death, and was buried at Mărțișor amid a controversy surrounding her inheritance.

== Biography ==
=== Origins and early life ===
Arghezi was born in Bucharest on 10 December 1924. Her father was Tudor Arghezi, by then a nationally famous writer, who celebrated her birth with the poem Cântec de adormit Mitzura ("A Song for Rocking Mitzura to Sleep"), and composed a new lyrical piece for each of her birthdays. Her mother, Paraschiva, from a rural family of Bukovina Romanians, was Arghezi's second wife. Specifically, she and her sister Saveta ("Tătana") were from the Burda clan of yeomen, hailing from either Bunești or Pleșești. They had been orphaned early on, after both their parents died of food poisoning. Paraschiva and Tudor's other child, Iosif Theodorescu, was born on 28 December 1925; as observed later by their family friend Constantin Beldie, the couple had been married for 15 years before having either child, who therefore risked being "spoiled" by their loving parents. Tudor had been married to Constanța Zissu, from whom he had another son, Eliazar Theodorescu. At exactly the moment of Mitzura's birth, Eliazar had rebelled against his upbringing, leaving Romania to try his luck in France, and establishing his fame there as photographer-filmmaker "Eli Lotar". He himself cited Paraschiva's pregnancy as contributing to his decision.

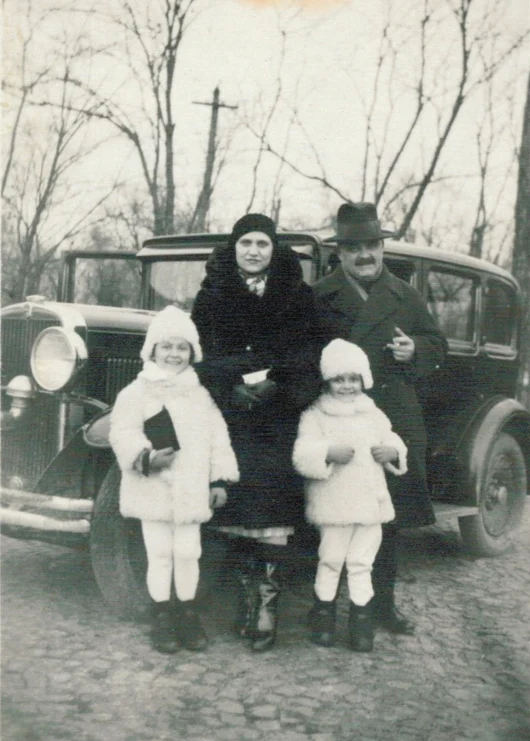
Paraschiva, Tudor, Mitzura and Baruțu Arghezi on a 1930s outing

Tudor and his immediate family were only officially registered as "Arghezi" from April 1956; though Mitzura took the famous surname, in a 2002 she referred to it as a "sweet burden", which had always seen her compared to her father. Throughout her life, she supported Romanian nationalism, presenting Arghezi Sr as a "good Romanian", and being herself critical of Romania's Hungarian community. On her father's side, she had ethnically diverse origins. These were long obscured by Arghezi Sr, and only became accessible after archival research in the 1970s. Records brought up at the time indicate that Tudor was born out of wedlock to the Romanian pastry-maker Nae Theodorescu, originally from Oltenia, and took his surname. Tudor's mother, Rozalia, was a domestic servant from Transylvania (at the time in Austria-Hungary), who also had children from other relationships; one of them was the lawyer Alexandru Arghezi Pârvulescu, who in 1975 revealed that "Arghezi" was also Rozalia's original surname, and not a literary pseudonym invented by her son. Rozalia gave her ethnic origin as "German", reporting that she had converted from Catholicism to Romanian Orthodoxy—though various of her contemporaries already knew her as a Hungarian, and more specifically a Székely, who had taught her sons to speak her native language. In 2015, journalist István Ferenczes discovered her birth certificate as "Rozalia Ergézi" of Vlăhița, further establishing her origin among the Székelys of Bukovina.

Domnica spent her earliest years at Mărțișor, an estate that her father had bought and developed in Văcărești, southern Bucharest, in 1926. This new home was only completely built in 1931, after Arghezi Sr had drained a swamp and extended a paved road. Mitzura and her two brothers were all partly raised by their paternal grandmother Rozalia, who lived with them at Mărțișor; he was noticeably discreet when introducing her, leading some of his close friends to assume that she was a governess, rather than the children's grandmother. As a child, Mitzura coined Iosif's lifelong nickname, "Baruțu"—a contracted and corrupted form of Apăreciule, from his constant requests for apă rece ("cold water"). After his youngest no longer required her services, Tudor forced his mother to move out of the house and into a rented apartment, or, according to Beldie, a monastery. The latter author was once told by Mitzura that Rozalia was Arghezi's stepmother, and was thus punished for having mistreated Tudor in his childhood; she also reported that Alexandru had been similarly shunned by the "Arghezi tribe" for speaking ill of them. Beldie notes that another one of Nae Theodorescu's wives, a Greek-Romanian, was on good terms with the family, and gave Mitzura her first lessons in English.

As reported by Mitzura herself, the writer loved both of his youngest children, and made them the literary subjects of his Book of Toys, which recounts his fascination with their early development; the book was much criticized by Beldie, who found that its only possible readers were housewives. However, he praised Arghezi Sr for not overindulging his children and for ultimately allowing his "anarchic" worldview to inform his approach to child-rearing. The father's affection is recorded in a September 1927 letter he sent to his patron A. L. Zissu from Râșnov, where he was vacationing when Mitzura was struck by an illness. As he confesses therein: "I was no longer able to write down just one line until today, when the light of her eyes shone again, when she could smile again". Creating his own printing press in Văcărești, he conceived early on of a plan to have Mitzura train as his illustrator, and Baruțu as a typographer. His method was also anti-literary; as he explained in 1935, he never read to his children, since "literature is a strictly intimate thing". As noted by literary historian Mircea Zaciu, Mitzura was always less educated than her father: while Arghezi Sr, who had spent time in Switzerland, used competent French in his correspondence, Mitzura's French letters were "puerile [and] immature", as well as ungrammatical.

Both Theodorescu children had an early start in the arts, with Baruțu publishing his first work of prose in 1939. Mitzura worked for a while in the ballet troupe of the National Opera, and appeared in shows staged by Floria Capsali, with whom she was already training in 1943. She ultimately gave up on this career path because, as she put it, "the life of a dancer is very constrained." Though "known primarily as a ballerina and actress", she also debuted as a visual artist, with ink drawings that were taken up by a Bucharest magazine during the same period. Writer and Orthodox clergyman Valeriu Anania, who visited Mărțișor during the 1950s, recalls its walls being decorated with her engravings. In April 1943, at the height of World War II, fifteen of her sketches were exhibited with the Grupul Grafic artists' society, and were positively reviewed by Ion Frunzetti. Frunzetti argued that she had found perfection in line art and animal drawing, especially with her "delicious panorama" of domestic life. In later musings on these events, Baruțu argued that Grupul's Dimitrie Dimitriu-Nicolaide was the one who approached his sister to have her featured in the show. As he notes, Dimitriu and his colleagues were "at odds" with the fascist aesthetics promoted by Romania's wartime Conducător, Ion Antonescu.

=== Marginalization and recovery ===
Soon after, Mitzura's father began openly questioning Romania's participation in the war as an ally of Nazi Germany, and enraged Antonescu with his satirical prose, in which he had targeted Ambassador Manfred Freiherr von Killinger. As Baruțu reported in 1960, the definitive attack on Killinger was first read to a family-only audience, including Mitzura; upon hearing it, Paraschiva exclaimed: iar ți s-a făcut de pușcărie ("it seems you're itching to get back behind bars"). Both Mitzura and her brother are thought to have "vetted" the work. Its publication resulted in her father's brief internment at Târgu Jiu. Mitzura and Paraschiva visited him there in October 1943, and found themselves treated with unusual respect by the local Land Forces garrison, whose staff had quietly endorsed Arghezi's patriotic take-down of Nazism. Both children were at Mărțișor, alongside their newly released father, during Allied carpet-bombing in April 1944, witnessing the area's devastation. They left the area and went into refuge in June, but returned once Arghezi Sr decided not to be guided by fear.

The poet was openly celebrated during the interlude which followed Antonescu's toppling in August 1944. At the time, the Romanian Communist Party, backed by the Soviet Union and its occupation forces, was experiencing an increase in influence. In February 1945, the communist ideologue Miron Radu Paraschivescu accused the writer of having backed the fascist Iron Guard, and of having embraced anti-Sovietism, noting that the Killinger incident was uncharacteristic. According to Paraschivescu, Eli Lotar, who had embraced "revolutionary" ideas and had deserted his family, was "T. Arghezi's first son—his first, and not just chronologically." Other communists were considering Arghezi Sr as an external ally. By August, contacts between the party and the Arghezis were mediated by Radu Bogdan of Scînteia; as he recalled in a 1993 piece, the effort was doomed: "Every person in that home, including Lady Paraschiva, Tătana (her sister), Mițura and Baruțu, not to mention the writer himself, were stunned by the occupation army and its behavior [...]. The family's hopes were directed exclusively toward the Anglo-Americans". For a while, the attempts at a rapprochement did not yet subside. In December 1946, a banquet was hosted in the writer's honor by the Ministry of Culture, headed at the time by Mihai Ralea. Performances included a dance number by Mitzura.

Mitzura was by then appearing as a backing dancer in Marin Iorda's version of Scapin the Schemer at Giulești Workers' Theatre—that institution's inaugural production. Overseen by Capsali, she and her fellow ballerinas were praised by Tudor Șoimaru in Adevărul as "agile and graceful". Her return as an illustrator had occurred earlier that year, when she designed the cover for the Romanian edition of Kenneth Grahame's Wind in the Willows. Her drawings and one watercolor were showcased at an independent exhibit at Căminul Artei of Bucharest. They earned her encouragement from art critic George Oprescu, who found her drawings reminiscent of Henri Matisse and Nicolae Tonitza, "that which is not a bad thing." Such work was continued in early 1947, when Editura Socec issued Tudor Arghezi's Țara Piticilor ("Land of the Dwarfs") with his daughter's vignettes. On Christmas Day, Arghezi Sr completed another cherished project by working with his two children on a self-published, artisanal, booklet, Drumul cu povești ("A Pathway of Stories")—it retains value as a collectible item. In June 1948, Mitzura and Baruțu, alongside Cora Benador and others, appeared in a ballet recital at the National Theater Bucharest.

During the early years of Romanian communism, introduced as a people's democracy in early 1948, Tudor Arghezi was lambasted in Scînteia editorials penned by Sorin Toma. Toma depicted him as a voice of decadent literature; one episode of his expose discussed Arghezi's belief in vitality as a principle in educating his own children. The article suggested that the very notion displayed Arghezi's preaching of individualism, against the "preservation of collective life", and that it fit well with raising his son and daughter as "children of the bourgeoisie". The writer was then virtually banished by the censorship apparatus. These circumstances were aggravated after December 1948, when Baruțu used the family's printing press to publish an anticommunist manifesto—he was arrested in 1949, and held in custody until 1950, when his father successfully negotiated his release with the nomenklatura. At this stage, the family was reduced to living from unusual sources of income, including cherries from the orchard and lumps of goat cheese, that Tudor Arghezi would sell to passers-by. According to Anania, this commercial activity was also embraced by Mitzura and Baruțu.

The Arghezis received semi-clandestine financial backing from writers such as Dumitru Corbea and Paul Anghel. Though both were communists, they also believed that Arghezi Sr had done nothing to deserve his persecution by the regime. In 1951, Mitzura had a small, uncredited part in the film In Our Village. Initially, she followed the literary path. Enlisted at the University of Bucharest Faculty of Letters, she was expelled due to political pressures in 1948. She was allowed to study at the Caragiale Institute of Theater, after reciting a Soviet poem in front of the examination board, which included Aura Buzescu. She went on to perform in a variety of small parts at the National Theater, but had to skip a year due to her poor health. By 1953, she was in the same class as the aspiring director Geo Saizescu, who greatly admired her father; as noted by Saizescu, she remained "rather skimpy on details regarding [his] earthly sufferings". Some records suggest that she was originally enlisted in the Institute's film section, and only later transferred to the drama section. Dur to her father's nonconformism, she had been barred from appearing at the National Theater.

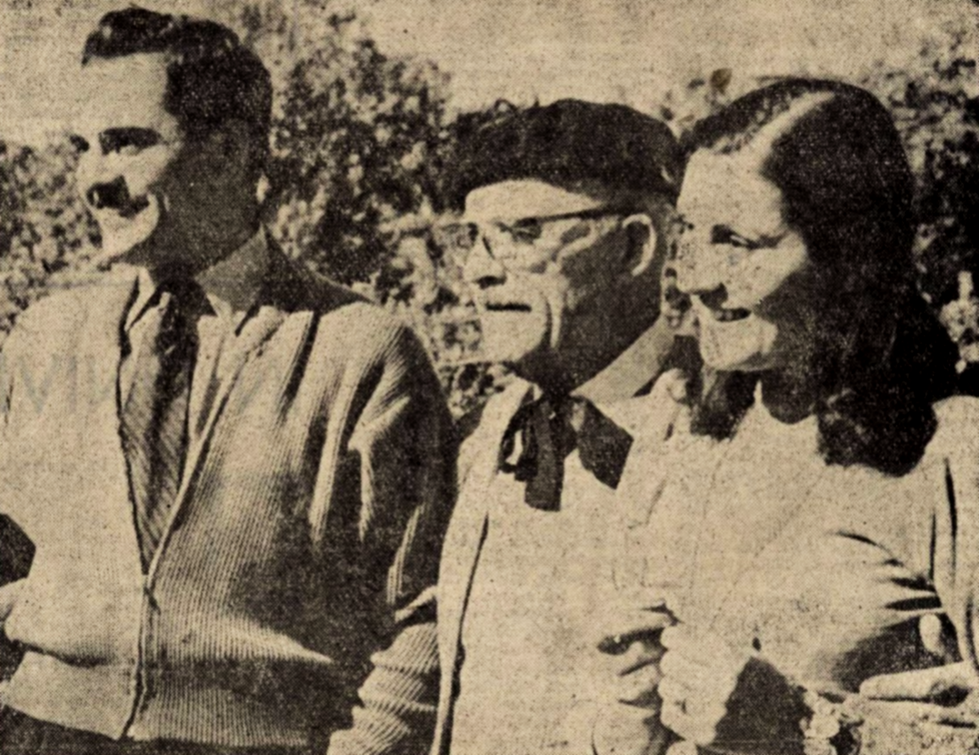
Baruțu, Tudor and Mitzura Arghezi, photographed in May 1960

From 1955, Arghezi Sr agreed to participate in communist propaganda, and was admitted into the regime's literary community. According to diary entries by his anti-communist friend Petre Pandrea, this pact was sealed due to material constraints, and in large part because of Mitzura's persistent pleas. Around that time, she was married to a fellow actor, identified by Corbea as Mircea Anghelescu. According to Pandrea, the marriage was Mitzura's second; he does not name her husband, but informs that the wedding, which took place somewhere in Oltenia in October 1956, was a lavish affair with over 1,000 guests and a "strictly Orthodox ceremony"—since, despite the officially endorsed atheism, major cultural figures who supported the regime's agenda were now allowed publicized exceptions. She had moved out of the family home the previous year, and spent time at various addresses. In 1964, she and her family moved to Dorobanți, in a recently nationalized townhouse on Grigore Cerchez Street. Communist leader Nicolae Ceaușescu amended this arrangement by having his own son, Valentin, take over the bottom floor for his private use.

=== Artistic and editorial fame ===
Censorship also became more lenient by 1957, around the time of her graduation. Mitzura Arghezi had begun work as a voice actress with the Romanian Radio Broadcasting Company, including with a rendition of Mihail Sebastian's Jocul de-a vacanța, for which she recorded alongside Radu Beligan, Dina Cocea and Colea Răutu. The following year, a new edition of the Book of Toys came out, at Editura Tineretului, and featured her drawings as illustrations. Mitzura received positive notice for her role as one of The Neighbors in Federico García Lorca's The Shoemaker's Prodigious Wife—a January 1959 production at the National Theater, which saw her sharing the stage with Draga Olteanu and Eliza Plopeanu. She owed her reintroduction there to her father's friend Zaharia Stancu, who had taken over as manager.

Eli Lotar, who had been marginalized in his profession and was becoming a destitute alcoholic, made several attempts to reconcile with Arghezi Sr. The latter again shunned his first-born, allegedly because the latter had asked him to invest in his film projects; Mitzura took pity on her half-brother, and for a while was the only person who still relayed messages between him and their father. In May 1960, both of Arghezi's Romanian children accompanied Corbea to Craiova, for a gala honoring Tudor (who could not attend) on his 80th birthday. In that context, Mitzura invited Saizescu to Mărțișor, where he and Tudor Arghezi discussed a film project. These talks resulted in the 1961 comedy film Doi vecini, which was submitted by Saizescu for the completion of his film degree, and which featured Mitzura in her second film credit. In 1964, she was given a major role in Titanic Waltz, as Gena. She noted her overall disappointment with this career choice, recalling her father's warning that the acting career "will bring one few satisfactions [...] if there's no one to support you, if you're not a director's wife, a manager's wife, this and that man's girlfriend, there's no way forward, you can be as gifted as can be, there will still be two parts for women and ten for men".

Mitzura divorced Anghelescu around 1960, but he remained close to the family. During the early 1960s, she was spending some of her time in Geneva, where Arghezi Sr was undergoing treatment for what he termed "sclerosis" and "loss of vision". She also began contributing to Scrieri, the definitive corpus of Arghezi Sr's works. Its seventh volume, appearing in 1965, featured the Book of Toys, again illustrated with her drawings. Around 1964, Mitzura and Baruțu (who was by then a physical education teacher in Bucharest) had monopolized editorial work on their father's newer poetry. Their effort was criticized by Pandrea, who argued that they exercised poor judgment, allowing "idiocies" to seep into definitive volumes. The two siblings looked after Arghezi Sr from 1966, when he became a distraught widower. Arghezi's contribution in the literary field went in parallel with her film and theater career. Also in 1966, she appeared as a provincial wife in the interwar-themed satire Calea Victoriei, and, as critic D. I. Suchianu argued, proved "excellent" for the part; she also reunited with Saizescu, with a role in his new project, La porțile pamîntului. Still employed by the National Theater, that same year she was noted for her performance as a nomadic Romani in Andrei Corteanu's Copiii pămîntului. In 1967, she appeared in Moni Ghelerter's production of Siringa—written by her father during his Antonescu-era internment, it had its inspiration in the author's real-life illnesses and his disdain for the medical profession.

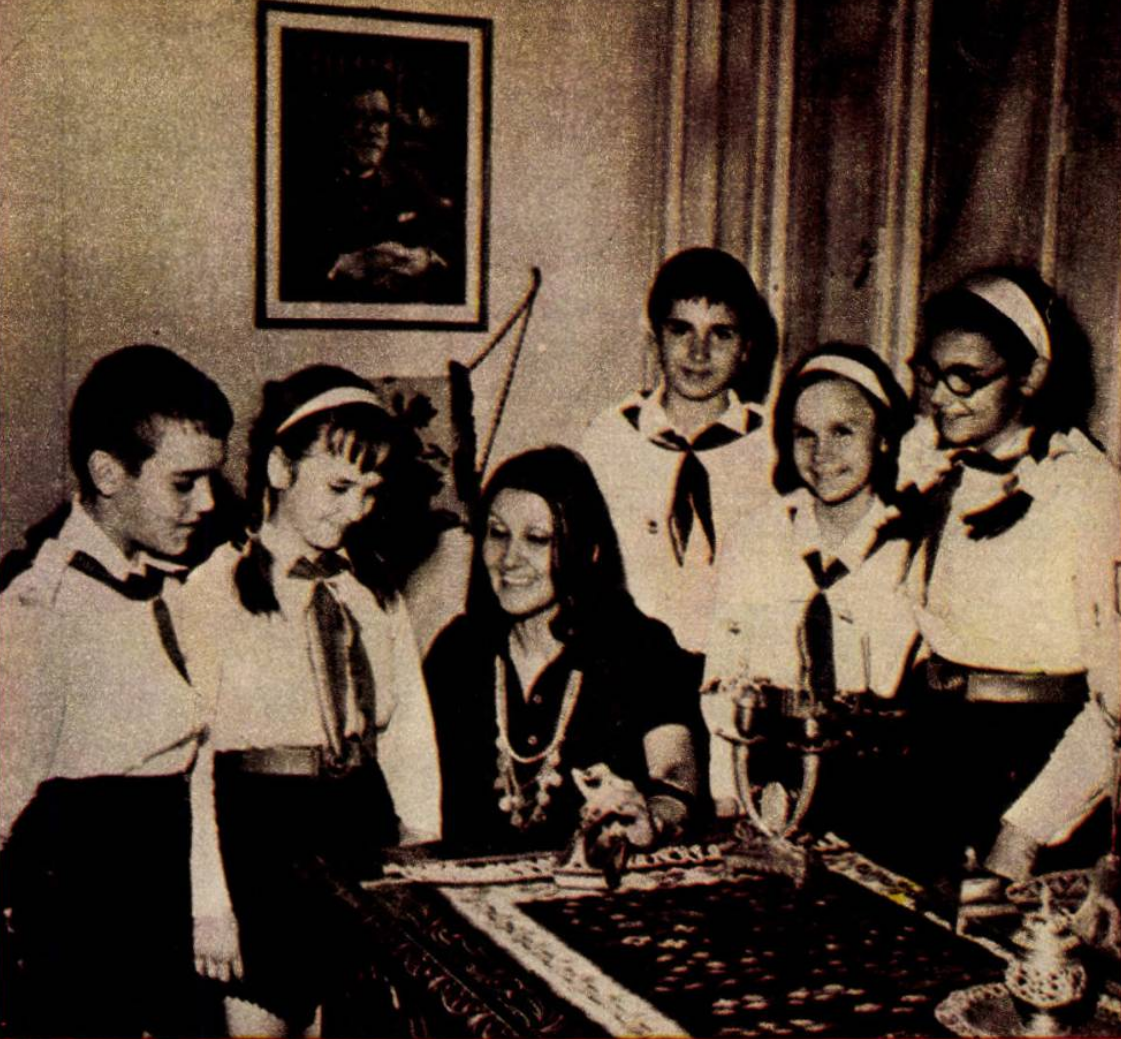
Arghezi with a group of Young Pioneers at Mărțișor, June 1975

Shortly after her father's death in 1967, Mitzura was made custodian of his papers, including his unpublished literary works. In 1970, she created controversy by refusing to authorize a critical edition, which had been proposed to her by researcher G. Pienescu. In a 2004 article, Pienescu further accused "Domnica Theodorescu, the writer's biological successor", of having borrowed his documentary collection under false pretense, of never returning it, and of then fraudulently using it for her own Arghezi editions. Lotar was left out of the disputes and publication projects—after unfruitful attempts to obtain his share of the royalties, he died in his self-imposed exile in 1969. Instead, Mitzura's activities involved her younger brother: in December 1972, the two of them appeared at Craiova for a festivity marking both the relaunch of Scrisul Românesc publishing house and the publication of their father's last poems. The following year, they issued with Editura Eminescu their own anthology of his poetic manuscripts, as Călătorie în vis ("Dream-journey"). It was poorly reviewed by M. Camil in Milcovul newspaper, primarily because "none of the book's poems is an Arghezian masterpiece."

In 1974, Baruțu opted to settle in Switzerland, and took with him all of his father's explicitly anticommunist manuscripts, that he intended to publish abroad. On his departure, he left his sister the remaining rights of usage for all other parts of the estate. By 1975, Mărțișor had become a museum, and Mitzura had been appointed its curator—calling this "my most important achievement". Serving continuously to her death in 2015, she organized it as a venue used by the Museum of Romanian Literature (MLR). The year 1970 brought a celebrated performance as a servant girl in Horia Lovinescu's Al patrulea anotimp, as produced by the National Theater. The following year, she debuted in amateur rallying: in June, she and Adrian Mureșan, driving a Dacia 1300, took bronze in an actors' competition held at Dinamo Stadium. In 1973, she appeared in Sergiu Nicolaescu's Ultimul cartuș, followed in 1978 by Eu, tu, și... Ovidiu, and in 1980 by Drumul oaselor. Between these, in March 1974 she was cast in the Romanian Television special Când trăiești mai adevărat ("When You Live out Your Best"), directed by Ion Cojar from a teleplay by Paul Everac.

Arghezi also found steady employment as a voice actress: the Radio Broadcasting Company had her appear in numerous radio plays, including at least two by her father, and also made her a co-host of the show De toate pentru toți. Alongside Ludovic Antal, she voiced a version of the Book of Toys, which, beginning in 1984, was sold as a collectible LP by Electrecord. Also in 1984, she starred in the comedy The Secret of Bacchus, followed in 1987 by The Secret of Nemesis. She was allowed to travel in the West, and visited the United States at some point in the 1980s. As she reported in 2002: "I did not like it, I wouldn't have defected there, not for a million dollars". During 1986, she engaged in a public polemic with literary historians Șerban Cioculescu and Nicolae Manolescu, who had probed into her father's foreign origins, arguing that these had been insufficiently or unreliably documented.

=== Political debut ===
Following the Romanian Revolution of 1989, Arghezi's activities at Mărțișor could explore topics that had been forbidden under the communist regime—in mid-1990, she and the Romania–Israel Friendship Society co-hosted a soiree dedicated to her father's philosemitism. She also provided the Centre Pompidou with images of her half-brother, which were used at the Eli Lotar retrospective of 1993–1994. In 1992, she sealed an agreement with the Romanian state, whereby the latter would acquire her rights to Mărțișor upon her death. Her own home on Cerchez Street, which she now shared with the National Institute for the Study of Totalitarianism (INST), fell under scrutiny, because any records of previous ownership had apparently been misplaced.

By her own account, Arghezi joined Corneliu Vadim Tudor's Greater Romania Party (PRM) in 1992, this being her first political affiliation. However, she was originally affiliated with another nationalist group, the Romanian National Unity Party (PUNR): she ran on its Bucharest list for the Chamber of Deputies in the elections of September 1992; although unsuccessful, in mid-1994 she was serving as vice president of the party's Bucharest section. In this capacity, she publicly accused a party colleague, Cornel Brahaș, of irregularities, such as investing the party funds in a Ponzi scheme. She had ultimately defected to the PRM by 1995—according to journalist Ion Cristoiu, she "seamlessly moved on" from one group to the other. A decade later, Arghezi described her involvement with the PRM as being motivated by her belief that "too many concessions are being made to the Hungarians", and by her perception of Vadim Tudor as a "patriot [and] one of the few honest politicians." In one of her speeches in 1997, she noted that the party doctrine was "national, but not extremist". According to a press report in Gazeta de Sud, during that interval Arghezi was suspected of leaking classified information preserved by her INST neighbors to the PRM's magazines, România Mare and Politica.

The PRM joined the Văcăroiu Cabinet coalition (the "Red Quadrilateral"), awarding Arghezi a position as Executive Secretary of the governmental department for Romanian diaspora affairs in early 1995. The department had been created as a special request by Vadim Tudor, and had Arghezi as its inaugural leader. In September, Cristoiu panned her activity as a sample of graft, describing Arghezi as a "failed actress" and one of her father's "worst creations". Arghezi only served in the department to November 1995, when she voluntarily resigned as a result of reshuffles. In July, she had been shortlisted by Vadim Tudor for an adjunct position in the Ministry of Culture, but rejected by Minister Viorel Mărginean—allegedly, because the latter found her too old and unattractive. The following month, she went public with criticism of the government, noting that it was too lenient toward the Democratic Alliance of Hungarians (UDMR). In that context, she demanded that the UDMR be outlawed for instigating a "civil war" in Transylvanian constituencies.

Arghezi was Vadim Tudor's campaign manager ahead of a general election in November 1996. She herself ran in for the Chamber, winning a seat in Olt County. The PRM list enjoyed unexpected success in that province, taking 7% of the vote. This win made her one of the 21 (out of 341) deputies who were of the female gender, including PRM deputies Daniela Buruiană and Leonida Lari. The PRM as a whole was in opposition to the governing Romanian Democratic Convention (CDR). By mid-1998, Arghezi had involved herself in the national polemics. On one of her frequent tours of her constituency, she responded to Constantin Ticu Dumitrescu, an activist and former political prisoner who had publicized documents depicting Vadim Tudor as a longtime informant of the communist Securitate. According to Arghezi, the dossier was fabricated from falsified evidence by forces operating from "outside the country's borders". In her counterclaim, she alleged that Dumitrescu had been involved in communist reeducation, and was therefore not a victim.

During the miners' protests of January 1999, Arghezi visited Slatina, and spoke out against the Vasile Cabinet for not allowing protesters to exit the Jiu Valley and complete their march on Bucharest. She came to serve on the Chamber's Committee on Human Rights, where, as she put it, she clashed with the UDMR, whose representatives she regarded as single-minded: "they are unified and they keep on advancing [their agenda]." In this capacity, she also helped strike down Mariana Stoica's project for the legalization of brothels. During the final deliberation of 6 October 1999, she argued that medical tests as outlined in that bill were not sufficient guarantees against the AIDS epidemic. The former actress was reelected in the elections of December 2000. She and Vadim Tudor were on show together to celebrate the PRM's unexpectedly good result, as the second-ranking party nationally. Arghezi went on to preside upon the new Chamber's inaugural meeting, as the most senior member of the house; this also made her the first woman to ever preside over a meeting of Chamber.

=== Old age and death ===
Arghezi's other work was with the committee on the Francophonie, which allowed her to "travel quite a lot", including in French-speaking Africa, and to observe that "black people are rather smart". She was also supportive of Romania's projected accession into the European Union. Around the same time, she became embroiled in controversies regarding her party's ideology and stances on government corruption. During April 2000, CDR Prime Minister Radu Vasile supervised an audit of the diaspora department, which produced allegations that Arghezi had engaged in embezzlement of public funds—including by not being able to account for electronic devices sent to the Romanians in Ukraine. In early 2001, Arghezi attended a festivity in Rahova, where a local high school was being named after Romanian Jewish novelist Mihail Sebastian. Arghezi's presence was described as inappropriate by Minimum, the Romanian-language Israeli magazine, who saw it as part of a PRM publicity stunt: "as if the party led by C. V. Tudor is head over heels in love with us Jews."

At the PRM national congress, held at the Palace of the Parliament in November 2001, Arghezi read out a congratulatory message from the Chinese Communist Party; this event, which saw party delegates issuing renewed calls for the UDMR's outlawing, was not attended by guests from Romania's other parliamentary groups. During July 2001, she had been scheduled to appear as Vadim Tudor's witness in a civil suit for libel, brought up by the CDR's Gavril Dejeu. She was fined in September for failing to appear in court. On the first days of 2003, Arghezi and Vadim Tudor signed up to a class action against Prime Minister Adrian Năstase, accused of having breached the Romanian constitution by allowing Cluj-Napoca to carry a second official name, in Hungarian. In mid-2002, Arghezi, alongside her former colleague Sergiu Nicolaescu (who had similarly become a national legislator), proposed controversial legislation that would have resulted in deputies receiving a significantly increased state pension, as compared to the average Romanian. The bill was vetoed by, among others, Vadim Tudor, who argued that Arghezi had "signed on to it without knowing what it was all about". Those months introduced speculation that Arghezi was growing senile, especially after, during a PRM rally at Sibiu, she dozed off in her chair, slipping and breaking her arm as a result.

Arghezi still continued to serve for another full mandate in Chamber, down to full-term elections in November 2004. She ran on the PRM Chamber list in Buzău County, but was no longer successful. She carried on as a PRM representative on the Radio Broadcasting Company board (2005–2010). This period saw Arghezi reaffirming her loyalty to Vadim Tudor: during the party schism organized in mid-2005 by Corneliu Ciontu, she remained affiliated with the Vadim wing, and served as head of its female section. In November 2005, she was confirmed as a member of the PRM's Permanent Bureau. Political scientist Tom Gallagher made a note of her dedication to the cause, as part of a larger phenomenon: "Proportionately more women sit on the parliamentary benches of the PRM than for any other party [...]. No woman has been among the numerous senior defectors from the PRM, so Vadim may have grounds for feeling that his position is secure if they are given a prominent role in party affairs."

Before the end of her Chamber mandate, Arghezi filled out a mandatory wealth declaration. It reportedly showed her as one of the least affluent MPs, who owned to her name some three hectares of agricultural land, a Dacia Nova, and an apartment. In 2002, she complained that all the expenses at Mărțișor were covered by her, and that the Museum of Literature was not fulfilling its tasks. She noted having never had children of her own, but also that she was looking after a relative, born with a major speech impediment. She was also involved in animal-welfare causes. Arghezi was also noted, and criticized, for her strict application of copyright law when it came to her father's poetic works: in 2005, she reportedly sued a publishing house for releasing an unauthorized version of her father's children's rhyme, Zdreanță. Four years later, she was criticized for charging exorbitant sums to anyone wishing to reprint any of her father's writings. This stance reportedly threatened private publishing houses, who could no longer afford to include them in literary textbooks, and considered skipping them entirely. Similarly, actor Ion Caramitru, who was performing poetry recitals to music by Johnny Răducanu, was forced to omit Arghezi's verse, but improvised with allusive references to it during a show held in Budapest. Arghezi teamed up with Vasile Voiculescu's legatee, Andrei Voiculescu, accusing the publishing houses of collecting large profits that "they do not wish to share with anyone else", and revealed that they never collected copyrights from texbooks that were made freely available to schoolchildren.

During the final stages of her life, Mitzura Arghezi joined Traian Radu in putting out the Tudor Arghezi corpus, which was being continued by Editura Minerva. These included the 42nd volume, appearing in 1999, with unedited and uncensored articles from the 1940s. It was praised for its documentary value by literary historian Zigu Ornea, who also criticized the editors for not including relevant information, and for tolerating "many typos." Arghezi survived her younger brother, who had returned to Romania—where he managed to publish his own edition of his father's secret works, in 2010. He died in Arad on 26 August of that year. Mitzura ceased her activities in September 2015, when she checked herself into Elias Hospital. She was later relocated to a nursing home in Bucharest's Sector 1.

This episode divided Arghezi's extended family and circle of friends, with Baruțu's daughter Doina Elena reporting her as missing; she was found to be sharing the lodging with Traian Radu, whom she had designated as her sole heir. Vadim Tudor spoke out against Radu on Antena 1, criticizing his decisions on Mitzura's behalf. This was reportedly his own last television interview, followed shortly by his death on 14 September. Mitzura herself died on the morning of 27 October; she was aged 90. An Orthodox funeral service was held for her at Mărțișor, where she was buried, in a tomb shared with her parents. This had been her request, included in the donation she had negotiated with the Romanian state. The ceremony was interrupted by another dispute around her remaining wealth, manifested as a heated exchange between Traian Radu and Doina Arghezi. In 2019, Radu sent the MLR a donation of various manuscripts left to him by the Arghezis.

== Selected filmography ==
- Doi vecini (1959) – Marița
- Furtuna (1960)
- Celebrul 702 (1962)
- Titanic Waltz (1964) – Gena
- Michael the Brave (1971)
- Șantaj (1981)
- Secretul lui Nemesis (1987) – The Neighbour
- Iubire și onoare (2010) – Varvara
