= Nenițescu =

Nenițescu is a Romanian surname. Notable people with the surname include:

- Costin Nenițescu (1902–1970), Romanian chemist
- Ioan S. Nenițescu (1854–1901), Romanian poet and playwright
- Ștefan I. Nenițescu (1897–1979), Romanian poet and son of Ioan
