= 1891 in Romania =

- Decades: 1870s; 1880s; 1890s; 1900s; 1910s
- See also: Other events of 1891; History of Romania; Timeline of Romanian history; Years in Romania

Events from the year 1891 in Romania. The year saw political instability and the fall of two governments, led by Gheorghe Manu and Ioan Emanoil Florescu, respectively.

== Incumbents ==
- King: Carol I.
- Prime Minister:
  - Gheorghe Manu (until 15 February).
  - Ioan Emanoil Florescu (from 2 March until 29 December).
  - Lascăr Catargiu (from 29 December).

== Events ==
- 3 January – The first edition of Unirea, the newspaper of the Romanian Greek Catholic Church, is published.
- 20 April – Romania issues its first commemorative stamps, to celebrate 25 years of the king's reign.
- 13 June – The first official train arrives at Bartolomeu railway station, the station having been inaugurated on 6 June.
- 2 November – Foundation of the Central University Library, Bucharest, as the Fundația Universitară Carol I (Carol I University Foundation).
- 15 November – Lascăr Catargiu visits Titu Maiorescu in his home for the first time in over a decade of mutual antipathy.
- 18 November – Catargiu, Iacob Lahovary and Constantin Olănescu resign from the cabinet, leaving Florescu without parliamentary backing.
- 9 December – The National Liberal Party and "Sincere Liberal" parliamentarians pass a motion of no confidence in the government.

== Popular culture ==
=== Poetry ===
- Pui de lei ("Lion Cubs") is written and published by Ioan S. Nenițescu as part of a compilation entitled Pui de lei. Poesii eroice și naționale ("Lion cubs. Heroic and national poems").

== Births ==
- 31 March – Ion Pillat, poet (died 1945).
- 4 April – Dumitru Cornilescu, translator of the Bible into Romanian (died 1975).
- 27 June – Andrei Magieru, theologian (died 1960).
- 2 August – Mihail Jora, composer (died 1971).
- 14 October – Gabriela Chaborski, chemist (died 1936}.
- 22 October – Dumitru S. Panaitescu, literary historian and critic, poet, essayist and fiction writer known as Perpessicius (died 1971).
- 3 December – Oscar Han, sculptor and writer (died 1976).

== Deaths ==
- 16 May – Ion C. Brătianu, Prime Minister between 1876 and 1888 (born 1821).
- 19 August – Theodor Aman, painter, engraver and art professor (born 1831).
- 30 August – Emanoil Bacaloglu, mathematician, physicist and chemist (born 1830).
