= 1947 in Romania =

- Decades: 1920s; 1930s; 1940s; 1950s; 1960s
- See also: Other events of 1947; History of Romania; Timeline of Romanian history; Years in Romania

Events from the year 1947 in Romania. The year saw the abdication of Michael I of Romania and foundation of the Romanian People's Republic.

== Incumbents ==
- King: Michael I (until 30 December).
- General Secretary of the Romanian Communist Party: Gheorghe Gheorghiu-Dej (de facto head of state from 30 December).
- Prime Minister: Petru Groza.

== Events ==
- 3 January – The Work and Reconstruction National Union (Romanian: Uniunea Națională Muncă și Refacere) party is founded by Constantin Argetoianu in Bucharest.
- 6 January – The Ministry of National Economy (Romanian: Ministerul Economiei Naționale) decides the rationing of the consumption of petroleum products.
- 10 January – The Military Court of Justice (Romanian: Curtea de Justiție Militară) decides that the trial of the Iași pogrom should start in Bucharest, at the Martial Court of the 2 Army Corps (Romanian: Curtea Marțială a Corpului 2 Armată).
- 10 February – Romania signs the Paris Peace Treaties.
- 3 April – The Assembly of Deputies (Romanian: Adunarea Deputaților) unanimously votes in favour of the Navigation and Commerce Treaty between Romania and the USSR (Romanian: Tratatul de Comerț și Navigație între România U.R.S.S.), that had been signed in Moscow on 20 February 1947.
- 7 June – CSA Steaua București is founded as Asociația Sportivă a Armatei București (Army Sports Association Bucharest).
- 14 July – Ion Mihalache and other leaders of the National Peasants' Party are arrested in the Tămădău affair.
- 15 August – The Marea Stabilizare, Great Stabilisation, replaces the old leu at a rate of 20,000 old lei = 1 new leu.
- 23 August – The Assembly of Deputies (Romanian: Adunarea Deputaților) unanimously votes in favour of the law ratifying the Paris Peace Treaties.
- 15 September – The Paris Peace Treaties enter force.
- 30 December – Michael I abdicates and Romania becomes the Romanian People's Republic.

== Births ==
- 1 January – Virgiliu Stoenescu, member of the administration council of the National Bank of Romania (BNR) since 2004.
- 2 January – Dumitru Covalciuc, Romanian historian, folklorist and writer (died 2017)
- 7 January – Dan Anca, Romanian footballer (died 2005)
- 12 January – Tatiana Moșteanu, economist.
- 14 January – Luca Pițu, essayist (died 2015).
- 1 February – Rozalia Șooș, handball player.
- 21 February – Romeo Chiriac, doctor (died 1995).
- 27 May – Liana Moraru, composer and pianist (died 2011).
- 7 July – Lidia Vianu, academic, writer, and translator.
- 22 July – Mihaela Peneș, Olympic gold-medal winning javelin thrower.
- 26 August – Nicolae Dobrin, Romanian footballer (died 2007).
- 21 September – Ștefan Arteni, painter (died 2020).

== Deaths ==
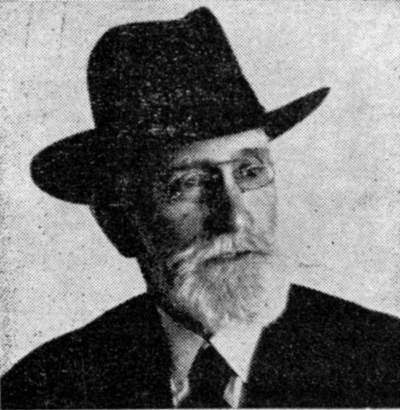
Iuliu Moisil

Gheorghe Ciuhandu

- 28 January – Iuliu Moisil, honorary member of the Romanian Academy (b. 1859).
- 14 April – Ioan Botez, literary historian (born 1872).
- 23 April – Gheorghe Ciuhandu, priest and human rights advocate (born 1875).
- 5 August – Constantin Vernescu-Vâlcea, actor who played Ion Luca Caragiale play roles and was student of Matei Millo (born 1865).
- 3 October – Traian Brăileanu, sociologist and politician, died at Aiud Prison (born 1882).
- 3 November – Alexandru C. Cuza, Romanian far right politician (born 1857).
- 8 November – Constantin Sănătescu, 44th Prime Minister of Romania (born 1885).
- 17 November – Emil Racoviță, biologist and Antarctic explorer (born 1868).
- 11 December – Aleksandër Stavre Drenova, Albanian national poet (born 1872).
