= List of strikes in Romania =

Throughout the history of Romania, a number of strikes, labour disputes, student strikes, hunger strikes, and other industrial actions have occurred.

== Background ==
A labour strike is a work stoppage caused by the mass refusal of employees to work. This can include wildcat strikes, which are done without union authorisation, and slowdown strikes, where workers reduce their productivity while still carrying out minimal working duties. It is usually a response to employee grievances, such as low pay or poor working conditions. Strikes can also occur to demonstrate solidarity with workers in other workplaces or pressure governments to change policies.

== 20th century ==
=== 1910s ===
- 1918 Romanian typographers' strike

=== 1920s ===
- 1920 Romanian general strike
- 1926 Romanian students' strike, antisemitic strike by university students demanding establishment of a numerus clausus.
- Lupeni strike of 1929

=== 1930s ===
- Grivița strike of 1933

=== 1940s ===
- Romanian Royal strike, in 1945.

=== 1970s ===
- Jiu Valley miners' strike of 1977

== 21st century ==
=== 2010s ===
- 2012 Romanian protests
- 2012–2015 unrest in Romania

=== 2020s ===
- 2023 Romanian teachers' strike
