= 1949 in Romania =

- Decades: 1920s; 1930s; 1940s; 1950s; 1960s
- See also: Other events of 1949; History of Romania; Timeline of Romanian history; Years in Romania

Events from the year 1949 in Romania. The year saw the introduction of collectivization and the first Romanian identity card.

== Incumbents ==
- President of the Provisional Presidium of the Republic: Constantin Ion Parhon.
- Prime Minister: Petru Groza.
- General Secretary of the Romanian Communist Party: Gheorghe Gheorghiu-Dej.

== Events ==
- 12 January – Capital punishment is introduced for treason and sabotage.
- 15 February – The Romanian Aeronautical Command is reorganised as the Aviation Command of the Army of the Socialist Republic of Romania, with regiments and aerodrome servicing battalions based on the model of the Soviet Air Forces.
- 3–5 March – The collectivization of agriculture is announced, with the abolition of the traditional rural hierarchy and socialisation of the agricultural workforce based on the Soviet kolkhoz.
- 29 June – Work on the Danube–Black Sea Canal commences.
- 23 August – Romania celebrates the first Liberation from Fascist Occupation Day.
- 14 September – The newspaper Scînteia accuses Marshal Tito of Yugoslavia of planning to invade Romania.
- 15 September – The first Romanian identity card (Romanian: Carte de identitate) is issued, causing concern amongst minorities like the Székelys.

== Births ==
- 5 January – Virginia Bonci, Olympic high jumper.
- 28 February – Zoia Ceaușescu, mathematician (died 2006).
- 20 March –Anca Petrescu, architect for the Palace of the Parliament (died 2013).
- 25 March – Margareta of Romania, princess.
- 12 April – Florin Zamfirescu, theatre and film actor and director.
- 14 June – Dan-Virgil Voiculescu, mathematician.
- 26 June – Decebal Traian Remeș, economist and politician, Minister of Finance (died 2020).
- 1 August – Mugur Isărescu, Governor of the National Bank of Romania, ex-Prime Minister of Romania, and member of the Romanian Academy.
- 16 September – Hildegard Puwak, politician and Minister for European Integration (died 2018).
- 26 October – Corina Chiriac, singer and actress.
- 12 November – Adriana Babeți, literary critic, translator, novelist, essayist. and academic.
- 28 November – Corneliu Vadim Tudor, poet, writer, journalist, and politician (died 2015).
- 24 December – Mircea Diaconu, actor, writer, and politician.

== Deaths ==
- 1 February – N. D. Cocea, satirist (born 1880).
- 28 March – Grigoraș Dinicu, composer (born 1889).
- 1 April – Ion Negulescu, lieutenant general during World War II, Minister of War in 1944–1945, died in Jilava Prison (born 1887).
- 28 April – Radu Korne, brigadier general during World War II, died in Jilava Prison (born 1895).
- 11 July – Corneliu Dragalina, lieutenant general during World War II (born 1887).
- 8 October – Gheorghe Mironescu, politician, Prime Minister of Romania in 1930–1931 (born 1874).
- 17 October – Aurel Aldea, lieutenant general during World War II, Interior Minister, and anti-communist resistance leader, died in Aiud Prison (born 1887).
- 28 October – Nicolae Dabija, officer who led a group of anti-communist resistance fighters, executed at a cemetery in Sibiu (born 1907).
