= Bellsybabble =

Language of the Devil

Bellsybabble is the name of the language of the Devil, mentioned by writer James Joyce in the following postscript to a letter (containing the story now known as "The Cat and the Devil"), which he wrote in 1936 to his four-year-old grandson:

The devil mostly speaks a language of his own called Bellsybabble which he makes up himself as he goes along but when he is very angry he can speak quite bad French very well though some who have heard him say that he has a strong Dublin accent.

The name "Bellsybabble" is a pun on Beelzebub, "babble" and Babel. Bellsybabble has variously been called a poly-language, a pluridialectal idiom and a ludic creation.

== Significance ==
For Giorgio Melchiori, it is suggestive of the idea that in literary texts, there is not a single language, but a multitude of languages, a different one for each reader of the text. It has been compared with the language of Joyce's novel Finnegans Wake, and has also provided the inspiration for C. George Sandulescu's study of Finnegans Wake, entitled The Language of the Devil.

Linguist John Haiman compares Bellsybabble to ordinary language in the way it continually shapes, and is in turn shaped by, the utterances spoken within it. This challenges the rigid separation between code and message. On one hand, the language determines the presupposed content and boundaries of possible messages, as shown by the concept of linguistic relativity. On the other hand, the message may also affect the code used by that very message.
