= 1954 in Romania =

- Decades: 1930s; 1940s; 1950s; 1960s; 1970s
- See also: Other events of 1954; History of Romania; Timeline of Romanian history; Years in Romania

Events from the year 1954 in Romania. The year was marked by the 1954 Romanian blizzard.

== Incumbents ==
- President of the Provisional Presidium of the Republic: Petru Groza.
- Prime Minister: Gheorghe Gheorghiu-Dej.
- General Secretary of the Romanian Communist Party:
  - Gheorghe Gheorghiu-Dej (until 19 April).
  - Gheorghe Apostol (from 19 April).

== Events ==
- 9 January – Opera Națională București (Bucharest National Opera) perform for the first time at their new venue. The performance is Tchaikovsky's The Queen of Spades.
- 3 February – Records are set during a massive snowstorm when 115.9 L/m^{2} (2.37 imp gal/sq ft) snow falls on Grivița, a layer of snow 175 m (574 ft) thick is found in Călărași and a high windspeed of 126 km/h (78 mph) is reported in Bucharest.
- 31 March – Jewish writer A. L. Zissu is sentenced to life imprisonment for "conspiring against the social order".
- 17 April – Article 4 of Decree nr. 189 establishes ensigns for auxiliary and Coast Guard vessels as well as serving ships of the Romanian Navy.
- 15 May – The Latin Union is created with Romania a founder member.
- 18 September – TARS is renamed TAROM (Transporturi Aeriene Române, Romanian Air Transport) to recognise the full ownership of the airline by the Romanian state.
- 5 December – Metalul Reșița become the first club representing Divizia B to win the Romanian Cup final.
- Unknown date – The Institute for Film and the Institute for Theatre I. L. Caragiale merge to form the I.L. Caragiale Institute of Theatre and Film Arts (IATC).

== Births ==
- 25 January – Ecaterina Oancia, rowing cox, gold medal winner at the 1984 Summer Olympics.
- 16 February – Maria Ștefan, sprint canoer, gold medal winner at the 1984 Summer Olympics.
- 10 May – Amos Guttman, Romanian-born director of the first ever Israeli LGBT-themed film (died 1993).
- 19 June – Dan Goldstein, software entrepreneur and businessman in Israel (died 2022).
- 28 June – Adrian Ioviță, mathematician.
- 25 August – Miron Cozma, labor-union organizer, politician, and leader of the Jiu Valley coal miners' union.
- 26 October – Victor Ciorbea, Prime Minister between 12 December 1996 and 30 March 1998.
- 7 November – Maria Grapini, politician and engineer.

== Deaths ==
- 3 January – Elena Farago, poet and children's author (born 1878).
- 7 January – Alexandru Cisar, Archbishop of the Roman Catholic Archdiocese of Bucharest (born 1880).
- 17 April – Execution of political prisoners:
  - Lucrețiu Pătrășcanu, politician, lawyer, sociologist and economist (born 1900).
  - Remus Koffler, communist activist (born 1902).
- 16 May – Vladimir Ghika, Roman Catholic priest, died at Jilava Prison, beatified as a martyr in 2013 (born 1873).
- 15 August – Alexandru Toma, poet, journalist and translator (born 1875).
- December 17 – Eugen Țurcanu, criminal who was executed at Jilava Prison for his role in the re-education experiment at Pitești Prison (born 1925).
- December 25 – Ioan Arbore, major general during World War II, died at Văcărești Prison (born 1892).
