= Mofturi 1900 =

- Original movie poster
- Directed by: Jean Georgescu
- Screenplay by: Jean Georgescu
- Based on: Moments and Sketches by Ion Luca Caragiale
- Starring: Iurie Darie; Ion Dichiseanu; Grigore Vasiliu Birlic
- Cinematography: Ion Cosma
- Music by: Gheorghe Mărăi
- Production company: Cinematographic Studio of Bucharest
- Release date: 1964
- Running time: 78 minutes
- Country: Romania
- Language: Romanian

Mofturi 1900 is a 1964 Romanian comedic film directed by Jean Georgescu and based on Ion Luca Caragiale's many Moments and Sketches. The sketches used are "Diplomatie" ("Diplomacy"), "Amicii" ("Pals"), "O lacuna" ("A gap"), "Bubico", "C.F.R." (abbreviation of "Romanian Railways") and "Din statiune" ("From resort"). The film stars Grigore Vasiliu Birlic, Iurie Darie and Ion Dichiseanu; and features Ioana Bulcă, Alexandru Giugaru, Mircea Crisan, Geo Barton and others. Set at the beginning of the 20th century, the story revolves around two Mitică characters sitting at a cafe telling stories to each other.

== Reception ==
The movie is one of the best Caragiale movie and quickly made its way to becoming a classic Romanian film. Prof. D.I.Suchianu said: "A Caragiale movie is one where the images explain the speech, not the other way around. A new genre entirely, I could even say an international premiere! It's Jean Georgescu great merit to bring upon the world this new born, <<Mofturi 1900>>."

"The most experienced romanian director to creating Caragiale moviessaid in his fascinating <<survival texts>>: <<Apart from the literary qualities, I.L.Caragiale was also a great screenwriter. All of his novellas are at the core a suite of images outlined by a very cinematographic narrative.>> I'd like to mention that Jean Georgescu harnessed successfully this special trait of the author" commented Calin Caliman.
