= 1895 in Romania =

- Decades: 1870s; 1880s; 1890s; 1900s; 1910s
- See also: Other events of 1895; History of Romania; Timeline of Romanian history; Years in Romania

Events from the year 1895 in Romania. The year sees Romania open the longest bridge in continental Europe.

== Incumbents ==
- King: Carol I.
- Prime Minister:
  - Lascăr Catargiu (until 3 October).
  - Dimitrie Sturdza (from 4 October).

== Events ==
- 4 June – Stadionul Tineretului is opened in Oradea.
- 10 August – A Romanian-Serbian-Slovak political alliance is formed to combat forced Magyarization in Austria-Hungary.
- 19 September – After interventions from Romania and leaders of other nations, Franz Joseph I grants a pardon to the Romanian leadership convicted for the Transylvanian Memorandum.
- 1 October – The Podul Regele Carol I (now called the Anghel Saligny Bridge) is opened, crossing the River Danube between Cernavodă and Fetești. It is the longest bridge in continental Europe and the third longest in the world.

== Births ==
- 7 January – Clara Haskil, pianist (died 1960).
- 18 March – Dan Barbilian, known under the pen name Ion Barbu, mathematician and poet (died 1961).
- 17 April – Ion Vinea, poet and journalist (died 1964).
- 14 November – Ion V. Gruia, jurist and politician (died 1952).

== Deaths ==
- 14 November – Alexandru Odobescu, author, archaeologist and politician (born 1834).
