= 1952 in Romania =

- Decades: 1930s; 1940s; 1950s; 1960s; 1970s
- See also: Other events of 1952; History of Romania; Timeline of Romanian history; Years in Romania

Events from the year 1952 in Romania. After a new trade agreement is signed with the Soviet Union, a new constitution affirms ties with the Communist state, indicated by a red star being added to the coat of arms, emblem and flag.

The regions of the Romanian People's Republic between 1950 and 1952

== Incumbents ==
- President of the Provisional Presidium of the Republic:
  - Constantin Ion Parhon (until 3 June).
  - Petru Groza (from 3 June)
- Prime Minister:
  - Petru Groza (until 2 June)
  - Gheorghe Gheorghiu-Dej (from 2 June)
- General Secretary of the Romanian Communist Party: Gheorghe Gheorghiu-Dej.

== Events ==
- 25 June – Romania signs a trade agreement with the Soviet Union.
- 18 July – A proposal for the boundaries of the Magyar Autonomous Region is published.
- 29 July – Iosif Sîrbu wins Romania's first Olympic gold medal in shooting.
- 24 September – The Great National Assembly adopts a new constitution with strong ties to the Soviet Union. A red star is added to the coat of arms, emblem and flag to show the alignment.
- 20 November – Parliamentary elections are held. The People's Democratic Front are the only party on the ballot.

== Births ==
- 14 January – Mihaela Loghin, shot put medal winner at the 1984 Summer Olympics.
- 14 January – Călin Popescu-Tăriceanu, politician, Prime Minister from 2004 to 2008.
- 30 January — Silvia Marcovici, violinist.
- 4 March — Florian Pop, mathematician.
- 12 March — Gregorian Bivolaru, organization founder.
- 31 March — Nelly Miricioiu, operatic soprano.
- 21 April — Cristian S. Calude, mathematician.
- 5 May – Maia Ciobanu, composer and musicologist.
- 30 August – Daniel Dăianu, economist, professor, and politician.
- 27 September – Dumitru Prunariu, cosmonaut.

== Deaths ==
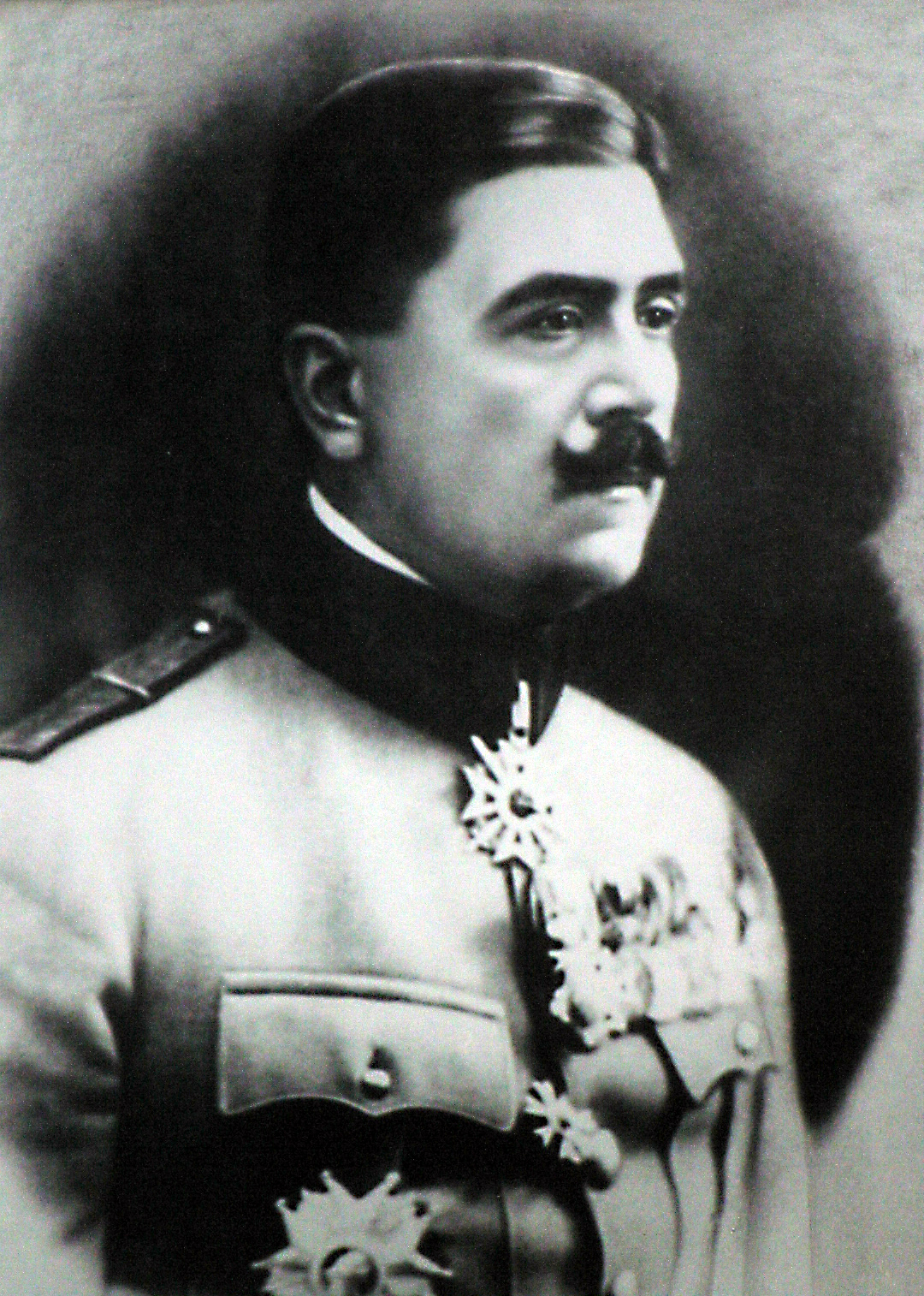
Ioan Rășcanu (1878–1952)

- 6 February – Ioan Carlaonț, major general in World War II and anti-communist resistance leader, who died at Aiud Prison (born 1885).
- 25 February – Stan Ghițescu, politician who died at Sighet Prison (born 1881).
- 25 February – Ioan Rășcanu, general during World War I, Minister of War in 1919–1921, who died at Sighet Prison (born 1878).
- 11 July – Valeriu Traian Frențiu, bishop of the Romanian Greek Catholic Church, who died at Sighet Prison, beatified on 2 June 2019 (born 1875).
- 16 September – Nicolae Păiș, counter-admiral, undersecretary of state, who died at Aiud Prison (born 1887).
- 2 October – Mircea Vulcănescu, economist, philosopher and far-right politician, who died at Aiud Prison (born 1904).
- 14 November – Ion V. Gruia, jurist and politician, who died at Sighet Prison (born 1895).
- 30 November – Barbu Alinescu, major general in World War II (born 1890).
