= 1946 in Romania =

- Decades: 1920s; 1930s; 1940s; 1950s; 1960s
- See also: Other events of 1946; History of Romania; Timeline of Romanian history; Years in Romania

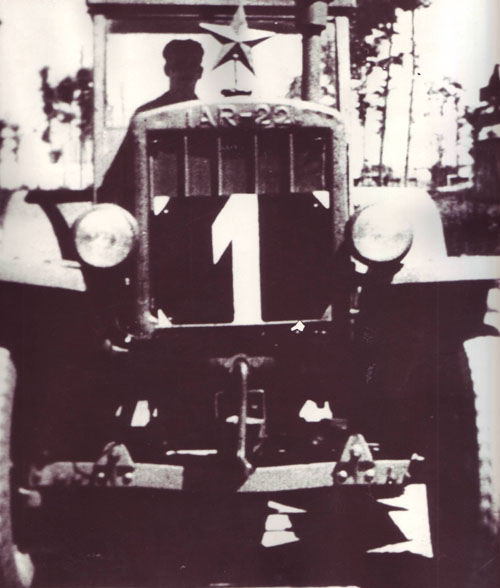
IAR-22, the first Romanian tractor (1946)

Events from the year 1946 in Romania. The year started with the end of the royal strike and ended with the Romanian Communist Party win the first election following the introduction of women's suffrage.

== Incumbents ==
- King: Michael I.
- Prime Minister: Petru Groza.

== Events ==
- 2 January – Representatives from the Soviet Union, United Kingdom, United States meet the Prime Minister and agree a formulation of the government that is acceptable to the king.
- 7 January – The king ends the royal strike.
- 22 April – Gheorghe Gheorghiu-Dej attends a meeting of Jewish organizations, calling for the creation of a Jewish Democratic Committee within the Romanian Communist Party.
- 2 July – Soviet and Romanian officials agree to create a SovRom joint venture in lumber production named Sovromlemn.
- 12 October – Romanians in Northern Transylvania draft a resolution asking for a say in whether they remain part of Hungary or rejoin Romania.
- 15 October – At the end of the Paris Peace Conference, Romania's borders are restored to 1 January 1941, with the addition of the transfer of Northern Transylvania from Hungary.
- 19 November – In the first general election with women's suffrage, the Romanian Communist Party wins with a majority.

== Births ==
- 19 January – Georgeta Stoleriu, opera singer and educator.
- 31 May – Adriana Bittel, author of short stories.
- 19 July – Ilie Năstase, tennis player ranked number one between 23 August 1973 and 2 June 1974.
- 31 July – Ecaterina Stahl-Iencic, Olympic-medal-winning fencer (died 2009).
- 12 October – Ion Rîmaru, serial killer who terrorized Bucharest between 1970 and 1971, executed at Jilava Prison in 1971.
- 14 December – Aura Urziceanu, singer.

== Deaths ==
- 8 April – Sava Athanasiu, geologist and paleontologist (born 1861).
- 11 April – Dem. Theodorescu, journalist, humorist, and critic (born 1888).
- 21 May – Ilie Șteflea, general and Chief of the General Staff during World War II (born 1888).
- 1 June – Ion Antonescu, military officer and marshal, Prime Minister and Conducător during most of World War II, executed at Jilava Prison (born 1882).
- 11 June – Sofia Nădejde, novelist, playwright and activist (born 1876).
