= Mircea Crișan =

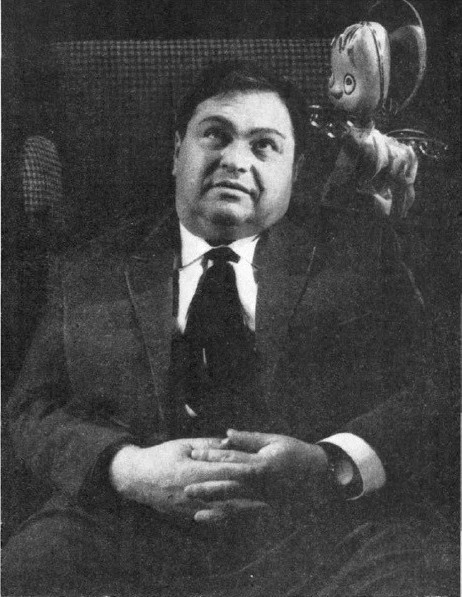
- Mircea Crișan in 1964
- Born: Mauriciu Kraus; August 8, 1924; Maramureș County, Kingdom of Romania
- Died: November 22, 2013 (aged 89); Düsseldorf, Germany
- Other names: Mircea Krishan
- Occupation: Actor
- Years active: 1955–2004
- Awards: UNITER Prize

Mircea Crișan (8 August 1924 – 22 November 2013) was considered to be one of the greatest Romanian comedians and comedic actors.

== Biography ==
He was born in the Maramureș region of northern Romania to a German Jewish father and Romanian mother, as Mauriciu Kraus. He traveled as a child with his parents in their circus. From 1944 to 1946 he studied Dramatic Art at the State Drama School in Bucharest, in the class of Maria Filotti. In the 1950s and 1960s, Crișan played in several Romanian comedy films and the theater. He was known as a star of the former Eastern Bloc and even performed privately for Nikita Khrushchev. In 1964 he was awarded the title of "Artist Emerit" of the Romanian People's Republic.

He took advantage of his second stint in the Music Hall Olympia in Paris in order to settle in 1968 in West Germany. He acted between 1974 and 1987 in four episodes of the television series Tatort. His film roles included Werner – Beinhart!, Schtonk!, and the 2005 Oscar nominated As It Is in Heaven.

Crișan acted between 1993 and 1997 and from 1999 until 2006 in the Störtebeker Festival. In 2006, he joined the Pumuckl theater tour. In 2007, he received in Sibiu the Culture Prize of the Romanian Theatre Union (UNITER). He spoke German, Romanian, Russian, Hebrew, English, Bulgarian, Italian, and Czech and lived in Hesse Maintal.

He died in November 2013 in Düsseldorf.

== Selected filmography ==
- 1955: Și Ilie face sport
- 1965: Mofturi 1900
- 1966: Corigența domnului profesor
- 1967: Șeful sectorului suflete – Costică
- 1970: Rudi Carrell Show
- 1974: Am laufenden Band
- 1974: Tatort – 3:0 für Veigl
- 1975: Zwischenmahlzeit
- 1976: Derrick
- 1976: Tatort – Annoncen-Mord
- 1978: St. Pauli-Landungsbrücken (TV series, 1 episode)
- 1986: Tatort – Riedmüller, Vorname Sigi
- 1987: Tatort – Pension Tosca oder Die Sterne lügen nicht
- 1990: Werner – Beinhart!
- 1992: Schtonk!
- 1993: Die Männer vom K3
- 1998: Die Wache
- 2001: Polizeiruf 110 – Seestück mit Mädchen
- 2002: Großstadtrevier
- 2004: As It Is in Heaven
