= Ion Dichiseanu =

Romanian actor (1933–2021)

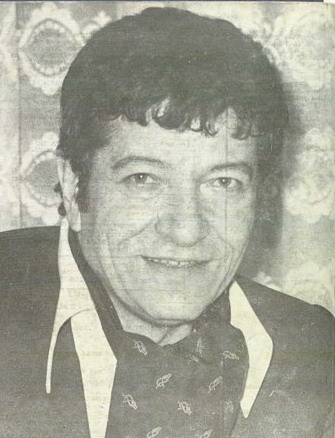
- Born: Ioan Ghiorghe Dichiseanu; 20 October 1933; Adjud, Putna County, Kingdom of Romania
- Died: 20 May 2021 (aged 87); Floreasca Hospital, Bucharest, Romania
- Resting place: Bellu Cemetery
- Occupation: actor
- Spouse(s): Sara Montiel, Simona Florescu

Ion Dichiseanu (20 October 1933 – 20 May 2021) was a Romanian actor.

== Biography ==
He was known, among other things, for playing in The Last Roman, Titanic Waltz and Mofturi 1900.

Dichiseanu died in the Floreasca Hospital in Bucharest on 20 May 2021, aged 87, after having stayed months hospitalized there. The cause of his death was a bacterial infection that caused a pneumonia.
