= Titanic Waltz =

- Directed by: Paul Călinescu
- Written by: Paul Călinescu; Tudor Mușatescu (play)
- Cinematography: Stefan Horvath
- Edited by: Eugenia Gorovei
- Music by: Kity Gheorghiu Mușatescu; Paul Urmuzescu
- Production company: Studioul Cinematografic București
- Release date: 1964
- Running time: 92 minutes
- Country: Romania
- Language: Romanian

Titanic Waltz (Romanian: Titanic vals) is a 1964 Romanian comedy film directed by Paul Călinescu and starring Grigore Vasiliu-Birlic, Silvia Fulda, and Kity Gheorghiu Mușatescu. It was based on a play of the same name by Tudor Mușatescu.

The film's sets were designed by Stefan Norris.

== Partial cast ==
- Grigore Vasiliu-Birlic as Spirache Necșulescu
- Silvia Fulda as Chiriachița
- Kity Gheorghiu Mușatescu as Dacia
- Mitzura Arghezi as Gena
- Lucian Dinu as Traian
- Coca Andronescu as Sarmisegetuza
- Liviu Bădescu as Decebal
- Ion Finteșteanu as the Mayor
- Mihai Fotino as Dinu
- Ion Lucian as Rădulescu Nercea
- Ion Dichiseanu as Gigi Stamatescu
- Florin Scărlătescu
- Constantin Rauțchi as a town hall clerk
- Horia Căciulescu as the organ-grinder
- Mircea Balaban
- Ion Pacea
- Ștefan Mihăilescu-Brăila as an electoral bully
- Atena Seciu
- Tamara Buciuceanu-Botez as Doica

== Bibliography ==
- Dina Iordanova. The Cinema of the Balkans. Wallflower, 2006.
