= Lidia Vianu =

Romanian academic, writer, and translator

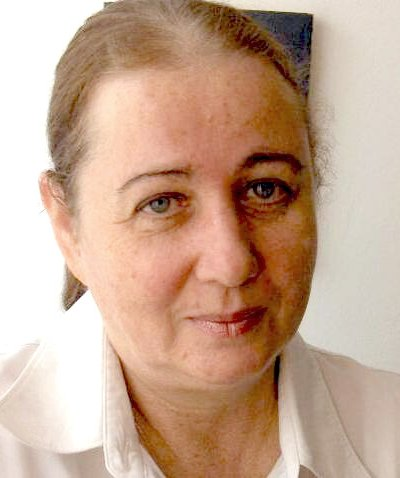
- Born: 7 July 1947 (age 78); Bucharest
- Citizenship: Romania
- Education: University of Bucharest, 1970
- Occupations: Academic; Literary critic; Translator; Writer; Poet
- Years active: 1970–present
- Known for: Contemporary British literature (mainly T.S. Eliot and James Joyce)
- Notable work: Joyce Lexicography, 130 volumes
- Awards: Poetry Society biennial Prize for Poetry in Translation, 2005

Lidia Vianu (born 7 July 1947 in Bucharest) is a Romanian academic, writer, and translator. She is a professor in the English department of the University of Bucharest, a writer of fiction and poetry, and a translator both from English into Romanian, and from Romanian into English.

== Biography ==
Her mother, Beatrice Vianu (born Steiner), was an editor, and her father, Theodor Vianu, was a doctor. She attended both high school (1961–1965) and university (1965–1970) in Bucharest. She graduated from the department of English at the University of Bucharest. She defended her doctoral dissertation in 1978, with a thesis titled Philosophical Lyricism in the works of T.S. Eliot and Paul Valéry. After the fall of communism, she was granted two Fulbright Scholarships, and taught in the United States, at State University of New York – Binghamton (1991–1992) and University of California, Berkeley (1997–1998). She became a professor in the University of Department English department in 1998.

Vianu learned English from Leon Levițchi, Dan Duțescu, and C. George Sandulescu. She published English with a Key (Romanian: Engleza cu cheie), a handbook that aims to teach English to Romanians through translation.

Vianu founded the Centre for the Translation and Interpretation of the Contemporary Text at the University of Bucharest.

== Work ==
As an academic, Vianu is the author of numerous essays, anthologies, interviews, and books of literary criticism. Most of them were written in English, while some were also published in Romanian. Her major subjects in English Studies are T.S. Eliot (T.S. Eliot, An Author for All Seasons), James Joyce, and contemporary British poets and novelists.

As a writer, she published Censorship in Romania (selection, interviews, translations) at Central European University Press, a novel, and three volumes of poetry.

She has published English translations of Eugen Simion's The Return of the Author, Marin Sorescu's The Bridge, Mircea Dinescu's The Barbarians’ Return (with Adam Sorkin), Ion Mureşan's The Book of Winter and Other Poems, Mircea Ivănescu's Lines poems poetry, and Ioan Es. Pop's No Way Out of Hadesburg and Other Poems.

She also published a large number of translated books in Romania. Vianu and Sorkin's translation of Marin Sorescu's The Bridge (Bloodaxe Books, 2004), was awarded the Prize of Poetry Society, London, 2005.

== Selected works ==
=== Literary criticism ===
- Scenarii lirice moderne (De la T.S. Eliot la Paul Valéry), Ed. Universității București, 1983
- T. S. Eliot: An Author for All Seasons, Bucharest: Ed. Paideia, 1997
- Censorship in Romania, Central European University Press, 1998
- British Literary Desperadoes at the Turn of the Millennium, Bucharest: Ed. ALL, 1999
- Alan Brownjohn and the Desperado Age, Ed. Universității București, 2003
- The Desperado Age: British Literature at the Start of the Third Millennium, Ed. Universității București, 2004
- Desperado Essay-Interviews, Ed. Universității București, 2006

=== Translations ===
- Joseph Conrad: Oglinda mării, Timișoara: Ed. Amarcord, 1994
- Eugen Simion: The Return of the Author, translated into English for Northwestern University Press, Evanston, IL, 1996 (Nominated for the Scaglione Translation Prize, 1997)
- Marin Sorescu: The Bridge, co-translated with Adam J. Sorkin for Bloodaxe Books, 2004
- Mircea Ivănescu, Lines Poems Poetry, University of Plymouth Press, 2009, co-translated with Adam J. Sorkin
- Ioan Es Pop, No Way Out of Hadesburg and Other Poems, University of Plymouth Press, 2010, co-translated with Adam J. Sorkin
- Ion Mureșan, The Book of Winter and Other Poems, University of Plymouth Press, 2011, co-translated with Adam J. Sorkin
- Hilary Elfick: A Single Instinct. Unicul instinct. Bucharest: Ed. Integral 2017
- Anne Stewart. Let It Come to Us All. Să vină pentru noi toți. Bucharest: Ed. Integral 2017
- Mircea Dinescu, The Barbarians' Return, Bloodaxe Books, 2018

=== Handbooks of English ===
- English with a Key, Timișoara: Ed. de Vest, 1993
- Student la engleză, Bucharest: Ed. Integral, 2016
- Admiterea la engleză, Bucharest: Ed. Integral, 2016
- Admiterea la engleză, Bucharest: Ed. Integral, 2016
- Metoda Lidia Vianu. Smile and Learn! Învățați inteligent. Învățați gramatica, în 7 volume, Bucharest: Contemporary Literature Press, 2021, 7 vols.

=== Fiction ===
- Prizonieră în oglindă, Galați: Ed. Porto Franco, 1993
- © Bumble--Bea. A tiny book about a huge heart : [in English and Romanian], [2022]
- Prizonieră în oglindă. Roman. Ediție revizuită, [2022]
- ƘΑΛΕΙΔΟΣΚΌΠΙΟ/ KALEIDOSCOPE/ CALEIDOSCOP. Parallel Texts. Ediție bilingvă, București: Editura EIKON, 2023, 531 p.

=== Poetry ===
- 1, 2, 3, Bucharest: Ed. Integral, 1997
- Moderato 7, Editura Orient-Occident, 1998
- Foarte, Bucharest: Ed. Cartea Românească, 2001
- The Wall, Bucharest: Ed. Integral, 2016
- 1, 2, 3. Poeme. Ediție revizuită, Bucharest: Contemporary Literature Press, 2022
- Foarte. Poeme. Ediție revizuită, Bucharest: Contemporary Literature Press, 2022
- The Wind and the Seagull. Vântul și Pescărușul. La Mouette et le Vent..., Bucharest: Contemporary Literature Press, 2022
- Vântul și Pescărușul / The Wind and the Seagull / La Mouette et le Vent, București: Editura EIKON, 2022

=== Interviews ===
- Sorin Ivan. Între Profesie și Literatură. Between Profession and Literature. Interviu / Interview with cu Lidia Vianu, Bucharest: Contemporary Literature Press, 2023
- Bogdan Stănescu (moderator). SCRIITOAREA LIDIA VIANU, INVITATĂ LA JURNAL CULTURAL #tvrcultural, TVR Cultural: Jurnal cultural, 14 noiembrie 2023
