= Jean Georgescu =

Romanian film director and actor

Jean Georgescu (25 February 1904 – 8 April 1994) was a Romanian film director, actor, and screenwriter. Born in Bucharest, Romania (where he also died), he was most notable for directing films including In Our Village (1951, in collaboration with Victor Iliu).

== Biography ==
With the support of the operator Nicolae Barbelian, he made his first film, Millionaire for a Day.

He was awarded the Order of Cultural Merit class I (1971) "for special merits in the work of building socialism, on the occasion of the 50th anniversary of the founding of the Romanian Communist Party."

== Biographies (in Romanian) ==
- Vă mai amintiți de: Jean Georgescu, 6 April 2010, Eliza Zdru, Adevărul
- 108 ani de la nașterea marelui regizor Jean Georgescu, 25 februarie 2012, Libertatea
