= 1892 in Romania =

- Decades: 1870s; 1880s; 1890s; 1900s; 1910s
- See also: Other events of 1892; History of Romania; Timeline of Romanian history; Years in Romania

Events from the year 1892 in Romania.

== Incumbents ==
- King: Carol I.
- Prime Minister: Lascăr Catargiu.

== Events ==
- 13 February – The Conservative Party publishes its manifesto.
- 13 March – The first edition of the newspaper Proletarul ('Proletarian') is published.
- 23 December – A trade treaty is signed between Romania and Italy.

== Births ==
- 28 January – Margareta Xenopol, composer (died 1979).
- 20 August – Octav Onicescu, mathematician and co-founder of the Romanian school of probability theory (died 1983).
- 3 November 1892 – Maria Antonescu, socialite and philanthropist (died 1964).
