= Floria Capsali =

Romanian ballet dancer and choreographer (1900–1982)

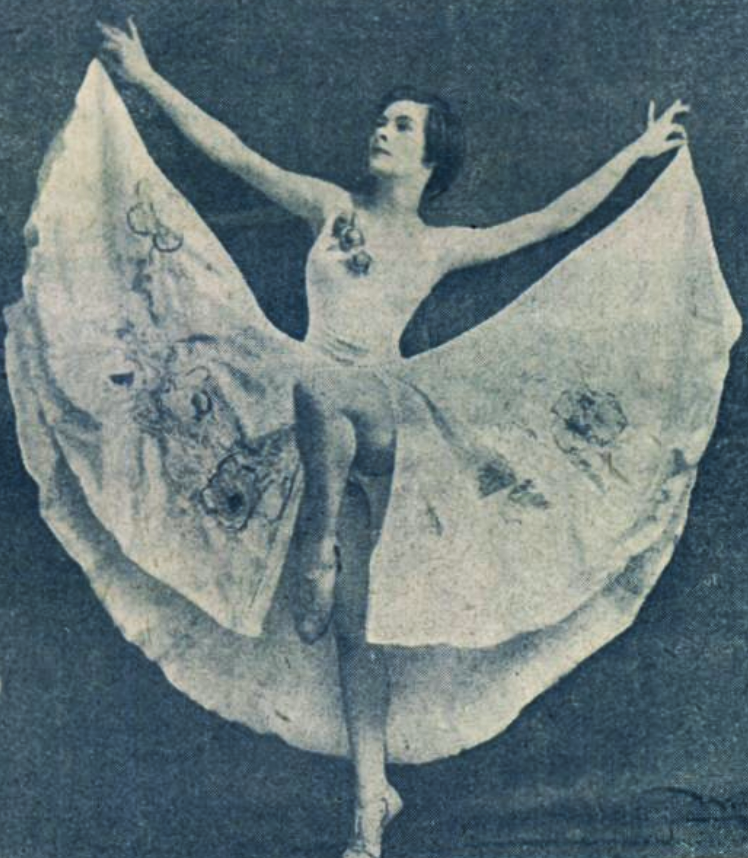
- Capsali in a 1929 advertisement
- Born: 8 February 1900; Bitola, Manastir Vilayet, Ottoman Empire
- Died: 29 June 1982 (aged 82); Bucharest, Romania
- Occupations: Ballerina; Choreographer; Ethnomusicological researcher dance teacher
- Spouse(s): 1. Mac Constantinescu; 2. Mitiță Dumitrescu
- Parents: Xenophon Capsali (father); Maria Manolescu (mother)

Floria Capsali (28 February 1900 – 29 June 1982) was a Romanian ballerina, choreographer and dance teacher.

== Life ==
=== Provenance, disrupted childhood and early career ===
Floria Capsali was born at Bitola, a midsized town and commercial centre in the hills south of Skopje, which at that time was in the ethnically and linguistically diverse Manastir Vilayet district of the Ottoman Empire and today is in North Macedonia. Capsali was an Aromanian. She was the elder by nine years of her parents' two daughters. Her father, Xenophon Capsali, came from a well-established mercantile family. Her uncle, who became her guardian after her father's early death in 1913, was the stage actor Ion Manolescu. Xenophon Capsali's sudden death occurred as the family was escaping to Romania in order to keep away from the ravages of the First Balkan War. During 1913 his widow and two daughters made their new home in Bucharest. Floria's mother, born Maria Manolescu, came originally from Breaza de Sus, in the Duchy of Bukovina, and had moved to Bitola as a young woman in order to take a position as head and teacher at the girls' secondary school in the town.

She began her school career at a primary school in Bitola, from where she moved on to the "primară franceză Saint Vincent de Paul", a French-language primary school. After the family relocated to Bucharest Floria Capsali attended the Școala Centrală, having won a scholarship. Three year after she settled with her mother and younger sister in Bucharest, the war reached Romania in 1916: she found herself working as her mother's helper at an armaments family. Soon afterwards her mother changed jobs, becoming director of a military hospital, and after school finished she spent each afternoon in the hospital "among the wounded ... talking to them, running their errands and even dancing, as far as I then knew how to". From Școala Centrală she moved on to the Stoenescu Theatre Academy and, a year later, the Bucharest Music Conservatory. At the conservatory she attended singing classes, and also learned music theory from the director of the institution, Dumitru Georgescu Kiriac. For a time she sang as a member of the prestigious Romanian Patriarchate choir.

=== Paris ===
It seems to have been at around the same time as she graduated from the Bucharest Conservatory that Capsali entered a competition which involved a dance performance on the stage of the National Theatre. Although she had enjoyed dancing recreationally as a child, this is the first indication in the sources that she might be destined to build her career as a dancer. As a result of the stage performance she was offered and accepted a scholarship sponsored by the Ministry for the Arts enabling her to study abroad. She went to Paris and studied classical ballet, also finding opportunities to pursue an interest in rhythmic and acrobatic dancing, attending classes with Jeanne Ronsay. Her ballet teachers at Paris included Christine Kerff, Enrico Cecchetti at the Grand opera and, later, at Cecchetti's prompting, Nikolai Legat, formerly principal dancer at Saint Petersburg. Other stars of the ballet with whom she studied included Léo Staats and Gaetano Saracco. In parallel she attended the city's Sorbonne University where she studied Art History and Theatre Art with Charles Dullin whose Théâtre de l'Atelier classes were much in vogue at the time. In the end Floria Capsaliu was based in Paris for a number of years, during which time, alongside her studies, she quickly came to prominence as an exceptionally talented ballerina, participating in stage shows in Paris, Nice and Marseilles. In Paris she even danced under the direction of Elena Văcărescu, winning plaudits from the Paris commentators for her balletic athleticism and artistic personality.

=== Bucharest ===
Sources differ over the precise timelines of Capsali's career during this period, but it was probably in 1922 that she returned from Paris home to Bucharest. In Bucharest she presented a series of balletic productions employing her own choreography. One of these, using youthful compositions by Robert Schumann of the same name, was entitled "Papillons". Another employed the more melodramatic "Mephisto Waltzes" of Franz Liszt. In 1923 she choreographed the balletic scenes for a National Theatre production of Shakespeare's "Midsummer Night's Dream".

In 1926 Floria Capsali married the sculptor Mac Constantinescu (whose work was sometimes produced under the pseudonym "Mihail Filip"). Constantinescu was something of a visual-arts polymath who turned out to be a talented stage-set designer, evidenced some years later by his work on the set and costumes for the stage-show-spectacular "Nuntă în Carpați" ("Carpathian Wedding") by Paul Constantinescu.

By 1927 Capsali was well established as a member of the ballet elite in Bucharest. That year she was invited to participate in the so-called "echipele monografice" ("Monographies project") coordinated from the University of Bucharest under the leadership of the eminent sociologist Dimitrie Gusti, researching a wide range of folkloric and ethnographic topics in the Romanian village communities. Other notable participants from the interface between the artistic and academic establishments included the ethnomusicologists Constantin Brăiloiu and George Breazul, as well as Capsali's husband, visual artist Mac Constantinescu. Capsali travelled all over Romania with one of Gusti's teams of "monographic school city-intellectuals", collecting folkloric materials over an "extended period". The information gathered on folkdance traditions created an intensified appreciation of "authentic" Romanian folkdance. Some of the material was used for Romanian ballet productions during (and beyond) the 1930s.

Throughout the later 1920s and the 1930s Capsali was a regular presence in Romanian ballet productions, not just as a dancer, but increasingly as a producer. Around 1930 she opened her own private dance school at which many of Romania's finest dancers of the successor generation would be trained. Pupils included Gabriel Popescu, considered by some the greatest Romanian ballet dancer to date, of any generation. On 5 April 1930 the "Flora Capsali" dance spectacular opened at the "Teatrul Liric" in the presence of George Enescu. Presented under the auspices of the "Romanian Compioserts' Association", it was the first show of its kind in the country. It turned out to be the first in a succession of ballet-based shows. Between 1931 and 1938 she worked for Constantin Tănase at the "Cărăbuș Theatre" (as the review theatre was known at the time), staging a tradition of stage shows reflecting the Romanian folklore revival: "Şapte gâşte potcovite au plecat să se mărite" (loosely, "Seven geese went off to get married"), "Florăresele", "Paparudele", Călușari. Reflecting the centralised nature of artistic life in Romania, most of her performances were given in Bucharest, but there were exceptions. In 1937 at Sinaia it was not as a dancer but as a director that she presented the premier of "Fata din Drăguş" ("The Girl from Drăguş") by Sabin Drăgoi and "Jocurile Olteneşti" (the "Oltenian Games") by Paul Constantinescu. She also built an international career, accepting invitations to perform in France, Germany, Greece and Yugoslavia between 1926 and 1933.

In 1938 Capsali took charge of the ballet at the Romanian National Opera, becoming the first ballet teacher to be employed there. She reorganised the troupe, increasing the number of soloists and established a group of leadership assistants within it, with whom she co-ordinated directly. She retained the position until 1950.

During her later years Capsali ran the "Liceul de Coregrafie din București" ("Bucharest Choreography Academy") at which generations of Romanian dancers have been - and continue to be - trained. In 1998 Arts and Education Minister Andrei Marga decreed that the name of the college should be changed to "Liceul de Coregrafie Floria Capsali".

== Recognition ==
By a decree dated 22 November 1967 the State Council of Romania conferred the title "Maestru Emerit al Artei din Republica Socialistă România" (loosely, "Emerita Master of Arts of the Socialist Republic of Romania") on Floria Capsali-Dumitrescu in recognition of her "excepionally meritorious artistic activities".
