= 1899 in Romania =

- Decades: 1870s; 1880s; 1890s; 1900s; 1910s
- See also: Other events of 1899; History of Romania; Timeline of Romanian history; Years in Romania

Events from the year 1899 in Romania.

== Incumbents ==
- King: Carol I.
- Prime Minister:
  - Dimitrie Sturdza (until 30 March).
  - Gheorghe Grigore Cantacuzino (from 11 April).

== Births ==
- 14 June – Vasile Aftenie, auxiliary bishop of the Greek-Catholic Church, beatified on 2 June 2019 (died 1950).
