= Fred Popovici =

Romanian composer (born 1948)

Fred Popovici (born 27 July 1948) is a Romanian composer, writing mainly for orchestra.

Popovici was born in Brăila, Romania, and studied at the Bucharest Academy of Music. Since his graduation in 1972, he has been a teacher and lecturer as well as having his works performed extensively both at home and abroad.
