= Pui de lei =

Romanian patriotic poem

"Pui de lei" (transl. "Lion Cubs") is a Romanian patriotic poem. It was written by Ioan S. Nenițescu, author of many other patriotic poems, with "Pui de lei" being one of his most famous ones. It was published by him in 1891 in his work Pui de lei. Poesii eroice și naționale, in which he compiled several other poems inspired in the Romanian War of Independence in which he participated. Ionel G. Brătianu composed a song for the poem in 1902.

The song, along with other ones that also evoke Romania's past and ancestors, was promoted by the Romanian communist authorities. In fact, in 1980, during the 2050th anniversary of the establishment of a centralized Dacian state, the song was officially sung. At the time, there were people who followed a tendency, known as Dacianism (or Dacomania), in which the Dacians were glorified within Romanian history.

However, the song was broadcast in Radio Bucharest (now known as Radio Romania International) by dissident employees on the morning of 21 December 1989, during the Romanian Revolution against the communist government, as a sign of the national uprising that was happening in Romania. In addition, it has been interpreted by the Romanian Land Forces.

== Lyrics ==
The lyrics of the song and their English translation are the following:

Eroi au fost, eroi sunt încă
Și-or fi în neamul românesc!
Căci rupți sunt ca din tare stâncă
Românii orișiunde cresc.

E vița noastră făurită
De doi bărbați cu brațe tari
Și cu voința oțelită,
Cu minți deștepte, inimi mari.

Și unu-i Decebal cel harnic,
Iar celălalt Traian cel drept
Ei, pentru vatra lor amarnic
Au dat cu-atâția dușmani piept.

Și din așa părinți de seamă
În veci s-or naște luptători,
Ce pentru patria lor mamă
Vor sta ca vrednici următori.

Au fost eroi, și-or să mai fie
Ce-or frânge dușmanii cei răi
Din coastă Daciei și-a Romei
În veci s-or naște pui de lei.

Translation:

Heroes there were, and there still are
And there will be in the Romanian nation!
For they are born out of hard rock
The Romanians everywhere they grow.

It's our inheritance
From by two men with strong arms
And with steel-like wills,
With clever minds, great hearts.

One is Decebalus the diligent,
The other Trajan the just
They, for their homeland
Have bitterly fought so many enemies.

And out of such parents
Fighters will always be born,
Who for their motherland
Will stand as the next worthy ones.

There were heroes, and there still are
Who will defeat the evil enemies
Out of Dacia's and Rome's side
Forever lions cubs will be born.
