= 1890 in Romania =

- Decades: 1870s; 1880s; 1890s; 1900s; 1910s
- See also: Other events of 1890; History of Romania; Timeline of Romanian history; Years in Romania

Events from the year 1890 in Romania.

== Incumbents ==
- King: Carol I.
- Prime Minister: Gheorghe Manu.

== Births ==
- 31 October – Sava Caracaș, general (died 1945).
