= Nutzi Acontz =

Romanian painter

Nutzi Acontz (November 16, 1894 – December 19, 1957) was a Romanian painter of Armenian descent.

== Biography ==
Nutzi was born in Focșani in the Kingdom of Romania. She studied at the School of Belle Arte in the Moldovan city of Iași. She was taught by professors Constantin Artachino, Gheorge Popovici, and Emanoil Bardasare. After finishing her studies, she worked as an art teacher in Focşani and Constanța. In 1930, she settled in Bucharest and focused on painting. Her paintings generally consisted of landscapes, still life, and interior scenes. Her paintings are now a part of some art collections from Romania and abroad.
