= 1954 Romanian blizzard =

Weather event in Romania

A massive snowstorm hit Romania (along with westernmost regions of Moldova) in February 1954.

Heavy snowfall that month was recorded on the following dates: 1-4, 7-9, 17-19 and 22-24. Wind speed reached 126 km/h in Bucharest on February 3, a record that still stands. The maximum quantity of snow was recorded on the 3rd in Grivița: 115.9 L/m^{2} in 24 hours, another unbroken record. The thickest layer of snow, 173 cm, appeared in Călărași on February 3-4 and also remains a record. Snowdrifts reached 5 m in the southeast of the country.
