= Baldi Olier =

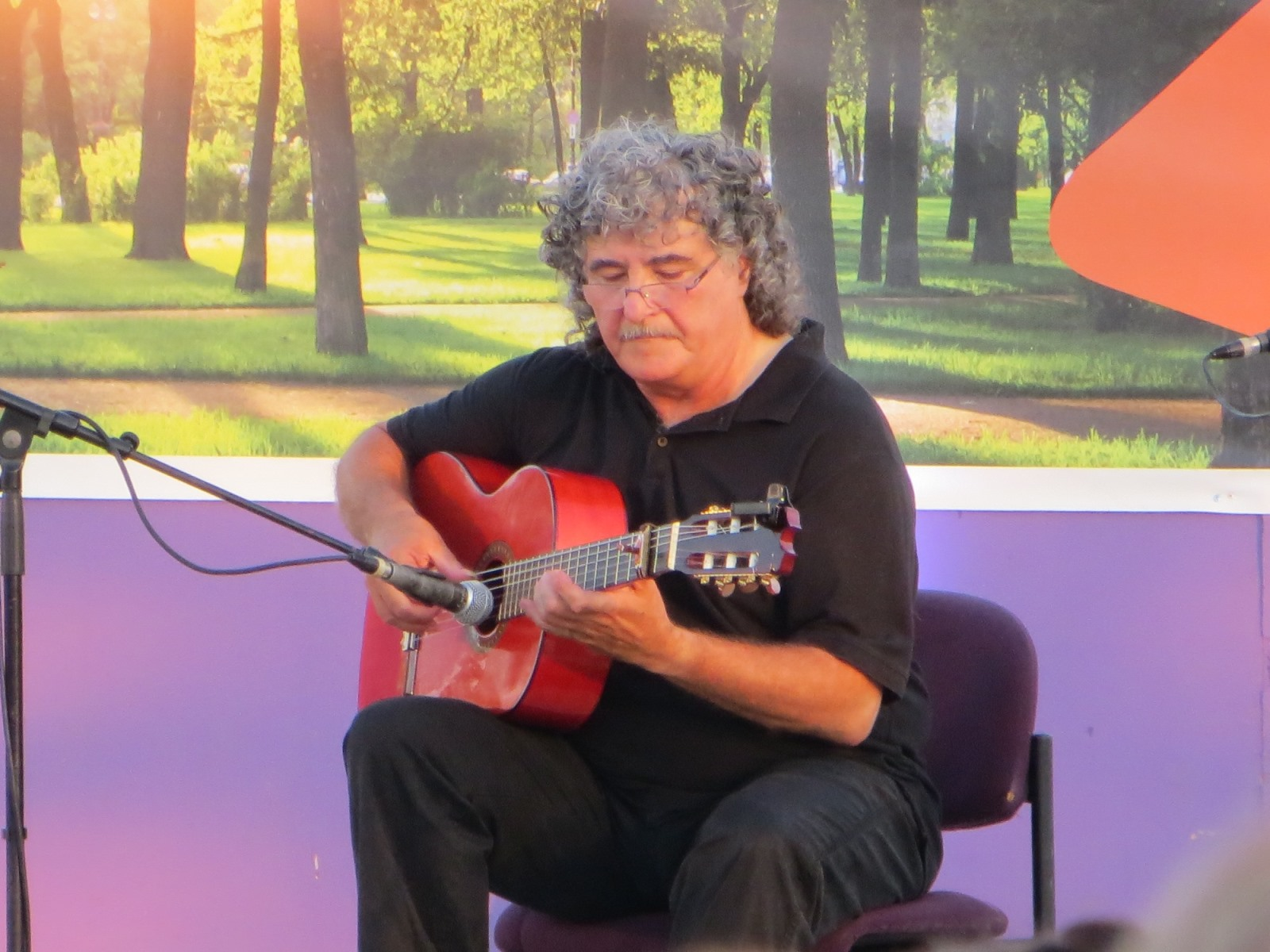

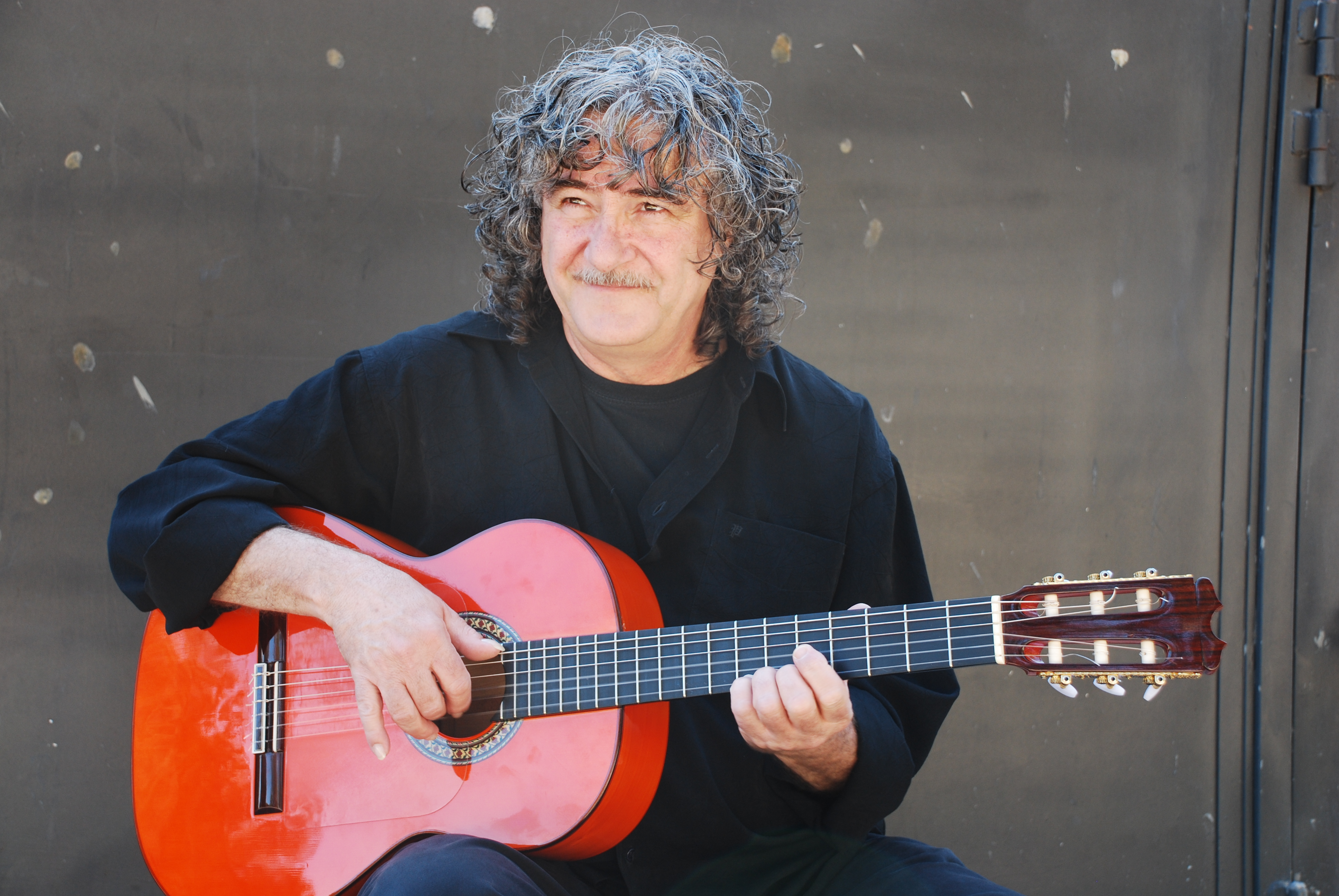
Baldi Olier in 2011

Baldi Olier (born 1953 in Romania) is a flamenco guitarist described by The Jerusalem Post as "Israel's undisputed king of flamenco".
