= Romanian Royal strike =

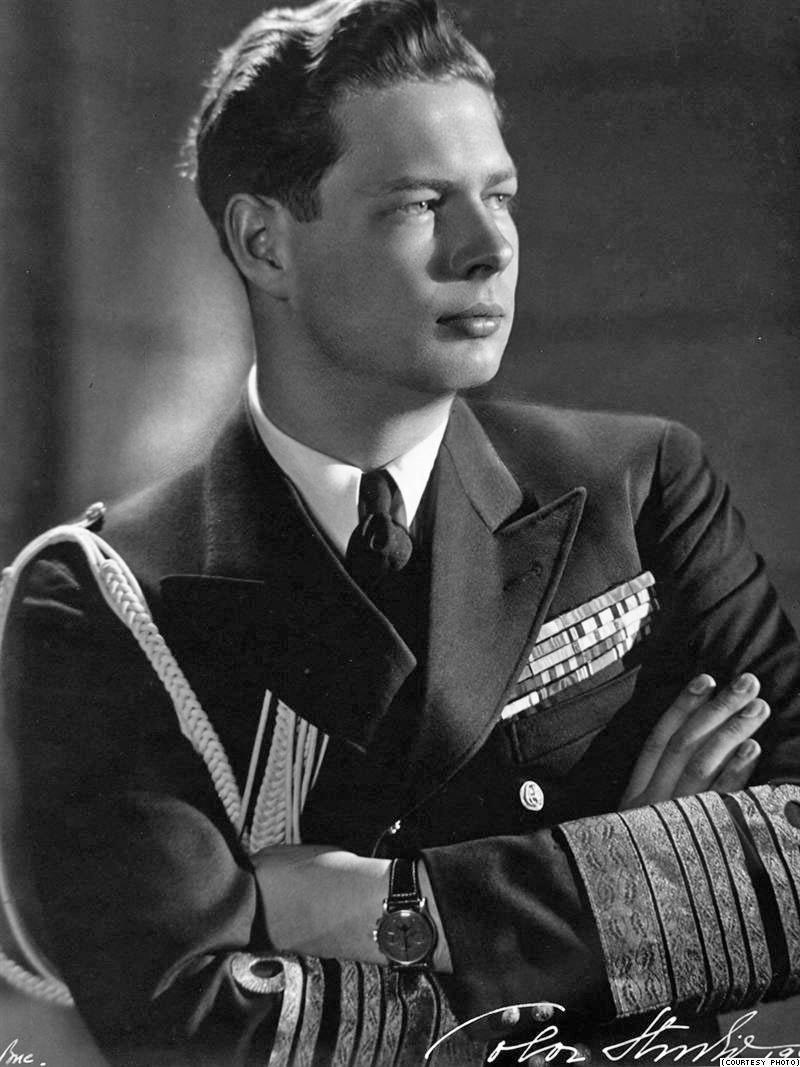
King Michael I of Romania

The Romanian Royal Strike (Romanian: Greva regală) was a period of constitutional crisis in Romania between August 21, 1945, and January 7, 1946. During this period, King Michael I refused to sign the bills enacted by the Petru Groza cabinet or to receive its Ministers in audience.

The King was "in strike" as a form of protest, following Petru Groza's refusal to resign his position on the King's request - an unprecedented fact in Romanian political life. Following the advice of the opposition parties, the National Peasants' Party (PNȚ) and the National Liberal Party (PNL), and silently encouraged by the Western Allies, King Michael sought to replace the left-wing Petru Groza Cabinet - supported by the Soviet leadership - with one based on the two opposition parties.

The Royal Strike ended in January 1946, when Petru Groza accepted in his cabinet two representatives from the main factions of the PNȚ and PNL, leading to diplomatic recognition by the governments of the United States and the United Kingdom. This was a formal arrangement, since the two Ministers held little power in a cabinet increasingly dominated by the Communist Party.
