= In Our Village =

- Directed by: Jean Georgescu; Victor Iliu
- Written by: Petru Dumitriu
- Produced by: Andrei Negreanu
- Cinematography: Wilfried Ott
- Edited by: Eugenia Gorovei
- Music by: Ion Dumitrescu
- Production company: Studioul Cinematografic Bucuresti
- Distributed by: Directia Difuzarii Filmelor
- Release date: 20 September 1951
- Running time: 66 minutes
- Country: Romania
- Language: Romanian

In Our Village (Romanian: În sat la noi) is a 1951 Romanian drama film directed by Jean Georgescu and Victor Iliu.

The film's sets were designed by Stefan Norris.

== Cast ==
- Constantin Ramadan as Ion Lepadat
- George Manu as Ionica Lepadat
- Nana Ianculescu as Maria
- Aurel Ghitescu as Ilie Scapau
- Andrei Codarcea as The Farmhand Mihaila
- Vasile Lazarescu as Pantelimon
- Valentina Cios as Leana
- Ludovic Antal as Avram
- Natalia Arsene as Floarea
- Cezar Rovintescu
- Gheorghe Soare as Ifrim
- Nicolae Fagadaru as Ristea
- Constantin Posa
- Nick Niculescu
- Alexandru Alger
- Niculae Scorteanu
- Liviu Ciulei as Dumitru
- Gheorghe Nicolescu
- Paul Zbrentea as Eftimie
- Ilariu Popescu
- Nucu Paunescu as Sarbu Iacov
- Marietta Rares as Ion Lepadat's Wife
- Nelly Dordea as Safta
- Puica Stanescu as Ana
- Jeannette Dumitrescu
- Doina Tutescu
- Ana Barcan
- Constantin Vintila

== Bibliography ==
- Liehm, Mira & Liehm, Antonín J. The Most Important Art: Eastern European Film After 1945. University of California Press, 1977.
