= 1898 in Romania =

- Decades: 1870s; 1880s; 1890s; 1900s; 1910s
- See also: Other events of 1898; History of Romania; Timeline of Romanian history; Years in Romania

Events from the year 1898 in Romania.

== Incumbents ==
- King: Carol I.
- Prime Minister: Dimitrie Sturdza

== Cinema ==
- Walking Troubles of Organic Hemiplegy, the first filmed medical procedure and first documentary produced on film, is released.

== Births ==
- 28 January – Gheorghe I. Brătianu, politician and historian (died 1953).
