= 1894 in Romania =

- Decades: 1870s; 1880s; 1890s; 1900s; 1910s
- See also: Other events of 1894; History of Romania; Timeline of Romanian history; Years in Romania

Events from the year 1894 in Romania.

== Incumbents ==
- King: Carol I.
- Prime Minister: Lascăr Catargiu.

== Births ==
- 21 June – Virginia Andreescu Haret, architect (died 1962).
- 30 July – Păstorel Teodoreanu, humorist, poet, and gastronome (died 1964).
- 16 November – Nutzi Acontz, painter (died 1957).
