= Ioan S. Nenițescu =

Romanian politician (1854–1901)

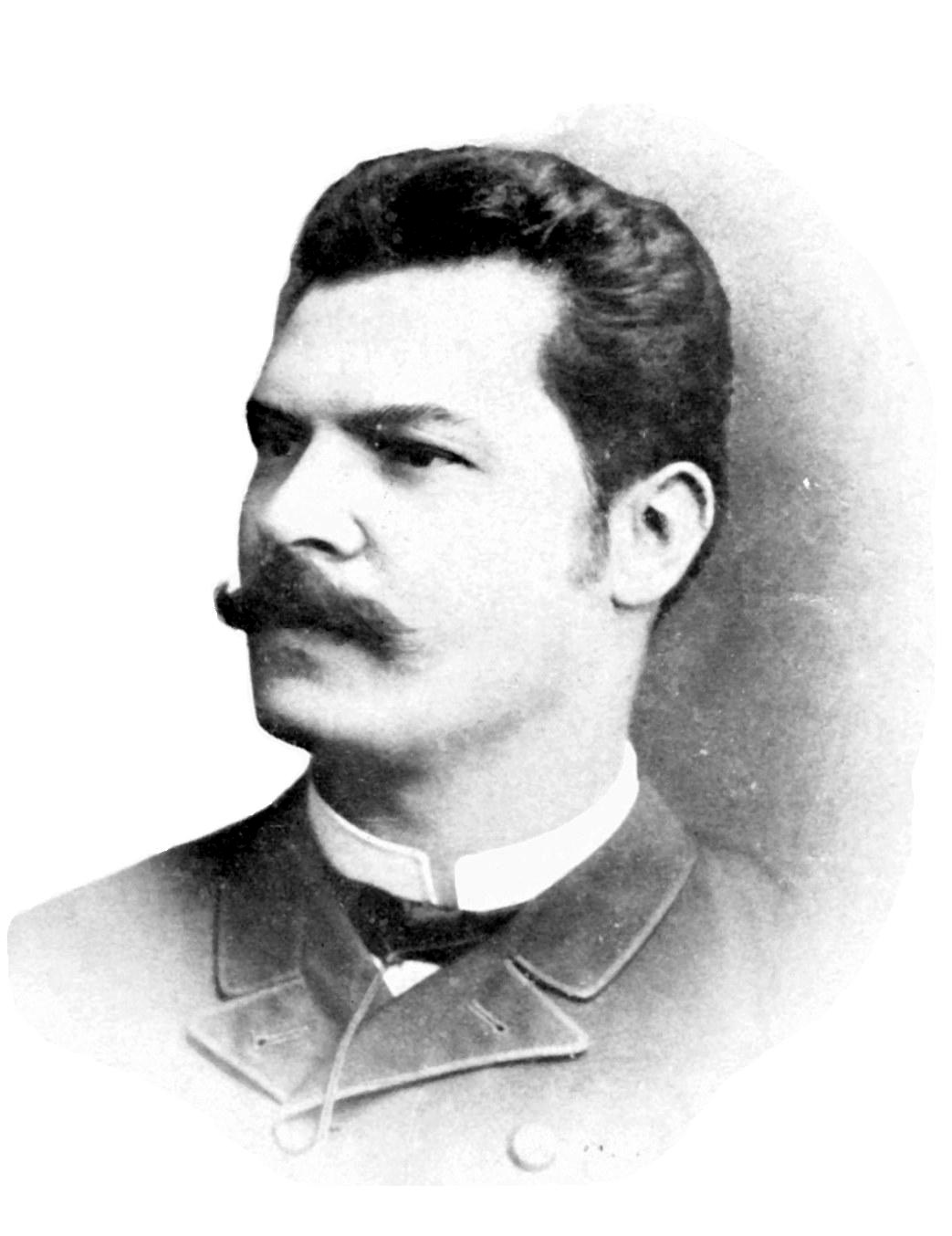
Ioan S. Nenițescu

Ioan S. Nenițescu (April 11, 1854 – February 23, 1901) was a Romanian poet and playwright.

Born in Galați, his parents were Ștefan Vasiliu, a manual laborer, and his wife Elisabeta (née Zaharia). After completing the Alexandru Ioan I commercial school in his native town, he finished high school, passing the exit examination at Iași. He also audited courses at the University Iași's literature faculty. Nenițescu attended an officers' school, volunteered in the Romanian War of Independence and was wounded at Grivitsa. He then studied at the philosophy faculty of the University of Berlin, taking a doctorate in 1887 at Leipzig University with a thesis on Baruch Spinoza. He worked as a schoolteacher and inspector in Bucharest. He traveled south of the Danube, a trip that resulted in an ample "ethnic and statistical study of the Aromanians" (De la românii din Turcia Europeană, 1895). He sat in the Assembly of Deputies for his native Covurlui County, and also served as prefect of Tulcea County in the Dobruja region.

Nenițescu's first work appeared in the Galați newspaper Gardistul civic. A member of Junimea, he published numerous poems in its organ Convorbiri Literare. He also contributed to Albina, Amicul copiilor, Revista nouă, Românul literar, Șezătoarea and Ziarul presei. While in Bucharest from 1884 to 1888, he published Țara nouă magazine, mainly submitting articles on pedagogy, ethics and sociology. His first book was the 1880 poetry volume Flori de primăvară, followed by Șoimii de la Războieni (1882) and Pui de lei (1891, including an eponymous poem). Of the plays he wrote, the only one he published was Radu de la Afumați (1897). In 1896, Nenițescu was elected a corresponding member of the Romanian Academy. He died in Buzău. His son Ștefan also became a poet.
