= Victor Iliu =

Romanian film director

- Born: 24 November 1912; Hermannstadt, Austria-Hungary (now Sibiu, Romania)
- Died: 4 September 1968 (aged 55); Rome, Italy
- Occupation: Film director
- Years active: 1948–1964

Victor Iliu (24 November 1912 – 4 September 1968) was a Romanian film director. He directed seven films between 1948 and 1964. His film The Mill of Good Luck was entered into the 1957 Cannes Film Festival.

== Filmography ==
- Anul 1848 (1948)
- Ion Marin's Letter to Scînteia (1949)
- In Our Village (1951)
- Mitrea Cocor (1952)
- A Lost Letter (1953)
- The Mill of Good Luck (1955)
- The Treasure of Vadu Vechi (1964)
