= Ștefan I. Nenițescu =

Romanian translator (1897–1979)

Ștefan I. Nenițescu (October 8, 1897–October 1979) was a Romanian poet and aesthetician.

Born in Bucharest, his parents were the poet Ioan S. Nenițescu and his wife Elena (née Ștefan). He attended Sapienza University of Rome from 1920, as well as the literature and philosophy department of the University of Bucharest. At first an assistant professor of aesthetics, he later became an associate professor at Bucharest. He served as press secretary and later economic adviser to the Romanian legation in The Hague.

Nenițescu's first publication was a 1915 article about William Shakespeare that appeared in Noua revistă română. His first book of poetry, Denii (1919), was followed by Vrajă (1923) and Ode italice (1925). His single volume of theatre was Trei mistere (1922). From 1924, he wrote for Gândirea, and was a founding member of Romania's PEN Club. He also contributed poetry and art criticism to Convorbiri Literare, Ideea europeană, Vremea, Universul literar, Viața Românească, Adevărul, and Arta plastică. In 1925, Nenițescu published a treatise, Istoria artei ca filosofie a istoriei. He translated from Benedetto Croce (Aesthetic, 1922) and Niccolò Machiavelli (The Mandrake, 1926).

Initially, Nenițescu's poetry was discursive and religious, in line with the Gândirist current. His verse became progressively more hermetic, as can be seen in the anthology volume Ani (1973). Including texts published in the 1940s and '50s, it reveals the intellectualized lyric verse of an eminently classical nature.

At the onset of the communist regime, Nenițescu was sentenced in 1949 to forced labor for life; after spending time in several prisons, including those in Pitești and Văcărești, he was set free in 1964. His house, at 4, Maria Rosetti Street in central Bucharest, was demolished in 2020, despite opposition from the city's mayor, Nicușor Dan.
