= Constantin S. Constantin =

Romanian general (1889–1948)

- Born: May 9, 1889; Bucharest, Kingdom of Romania
- Died: February 29, 1948 (aged 58); Văcărești Prison, Văcărești, Bucharest, People's Republic of Romania
- Military career
- Allegiance: Kingdom of Romania
- Branch: Romanian Land Forces
- Rank: Major general
- Conflicts: World War II
- Awards: Order of the Star of Romania, Grand Officer class

Constantin S. Constantin (May 9, 1889 – February 29, 1948) was a Romanian major general during World War II.

Born in Bucharest, he advanced in rank to lieutenant colonel in 1927, and to colonel in 1934. In 1939 he was promoted to brigadier general and was appointed assistant chief general staff. In January 1941 he became secretary-general of administration, Ministry of Defence. In November 1941 he was awarded the Order of the Star of Romania, Grand Officer class for his role in the Siege of Odessa. From 18 November 1941 to 15 July 1943 he served in the Third Antonescu cabinet as under-secretary of state for army and civilian supply. He was promoted to major general in 1942, and went into reserve in July 1943.

From February to September 1944, Constantin was deputy general officer commanding, Capital Military Command. He went into reserve again that year, and retired in March 1945. In 1946, he was arrested and on 6 February 1948 was condemned to 10 years imprisonment. He died several weeks later in the Văcărești Prison.
