= 1889 in Romania =

- Decades: 1860s; 1870s; 1880s; 1890s; 1900s
- See also: Other events of 1889; History of Romania; Timeline of Romanian history; Years in Romania

Events from the year 1889 in Romania. During the year, the country passed a law to enter the gold standard.

== Incumbents ==
- King: Carol I.
- Prime Minister:
  - Theodor Rosetti (until 29 March.
  - Lascăr Catargiu (between 29 March and 5 November).
  - Gheorghe Manu (from 5 November).

== Events ==
- May 19 – A law is passed to adopt the gold standard aligned with the Latin Monetary Union. The law comes into force on 17 March 1890.

== Births ==
- 3 April – Grigoraș Dinicu, composer (died 1949).
- 9 May – Constantin S. Constantin, major general during World War II (died 1948).
- 12 May – Ion Manolescu-Strunga, politician (died 1951).
