= C. George Sandulescu =

Romanian scholar of James Joyce (1933–2018)

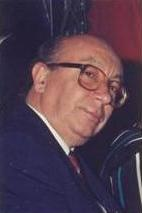
C. George Sandulescu

Constantin George Sandulescu (11 February 1933, Bucharest – 27 October 2018, Monte Carlo) was a Joycean scholar, but in the first place, he was a linguist with twelve years' experience in the Department of Theoretical Linguistics of the University of Stockholm in the 1970s and 1980s, specializing in Discourse Analysis. In that capacity he read a dozen or so papers at various international congresses (see texts below).

His education includes a B.A. degree (Bucharest), M.Phil. (Leeds) and PhD (Essex). George Sandulescu has worked as a researcher at university level for 12 years in Romania (between 1957 and 1969), for 12 years in Sweden (from 1970 to 1982), and for 12 years in the Principality of Monaco (from 1984 to 1996). He taught at Bucharest University between 1962 and 1969. He has lived, worked, and conducted research and teaching in major institutions in Romania, Sweden, Great Britain, the United States and Italy.

After the death in 1983 of Princess Grace of Monaco, he substantially assisted in founding the Monaco library bearing her name, and organised important International Conferences there devoted to James Joyce (1985 and 1990), William Butler Yeats (1987), Samuel Beckett (1991), and Oscar Wilde (1993). On the invitation of Prince Rainier III, and together with the British writer Anthony Burgess, also a resident of Monaco, George Sandulescu was one of the founders of the Princess Grace Irish Library of Monaco—the fundamental purpose of which was to publish literary criticism in two distinct series of publications, produced by Colin Smythe Ltd., of Gerrards Cross. More than 25 volumes were published in the period from 1985 to 1997; the programme had stopped by 2000.

George Sandulescu attended most James Joyce Conventions, Conferences and get-togethers which took place in Europe (and some of them in the United States) between the years 1975 and 1990. (The same applied to both Theoretical and Practical Linguistics during the same period of time.)He stopped in 1990, after having organized the 12th James Joyce Symposium in the Principality of Monaco.

As Director of the Princess Grace Irish Library between 1982 and 1996, George Sandulescu made a point of organizing World Congresses in Monaco, devoted to the Irish writers Wilde, Yeats, Joyce and Beckett. Both the Director Sandulescu, the Reigning Family, the Trustees of the Library, and the Principality as a whole invited the families of these four writers to actively participate in the event, as an essential point in the success and completeness of these manifestations (see Proceedings below).

== Literary criticism ==
- C. George Sandulescu, The Joycean Monologue. A Study of Ulysses, A Wake Newslitter Press, Colchester, Essex (England), 1979; revised for The Contemporary Literature Press, under the University of Bucharest
- C. George Sandulescu, The Language of the Devil, Texture and Archetype in Finnegans Wake, Colin Smythe Ltd. of London and Dufour Editions of Chester Springs, Pennsylvania, 1987
- Assessing the 1984 Ulysses. The Princess Grace Irish Library. Signed, Eds. C. George Sandulescu, Clive Hart, Colin Smythe (1986)
- Rediscovering Oscar Wilde, Ed. C.George Sandulescu, Rowman & Littlefield Publishers, Inc. (6 December 1994)
- Images of Joyce: Volume 1, Eds. Clive Hart, C. George Sandulescu, Bonnie K. Scott, and Fritz Senn, A Colin Smythe Publication (12 November 1998)
- Images of Joyce: Volume 2, Eds. Clive Hart, C. George Sandulescu, Bonnie K. Scott, and Fritz Senn, A Colin Smythe Publication (12 November 1998)
- Beckett and Beyond, Ed. C. George Sandulescu, Colin Smythe Ltd. (10 May 1999)
- George Sandulescu, Two Great Translators into English – Levițchi and Duțescu – Two Personalities to Remember
- Mihail C. Vlădescu: Opere complete (ed.and author of A New Noica of Long Ago: Mihail C. Vlădescu)
- Constantin Noica: Doing Time (ed. and author of Atitudinea Noica)
- Noica Anthology. Volume Two: General Philosophy, edited by C. George Sandulescu, Contemporary Literature Press (Bucharest University)
- Noica Anthology. Volume Three: Rostirea românească de la Eminescu cetire, edited by C. George Sandulescu, Contemporary Literature Press (Bucharest University)
- Counterfeiting Noica! Controversatul Noica răsare din nou!, edited by C. George Sandulescu, Contemporary Literature Press (Bucharest University)
- C. George Sandulescu, English Grammar Exercises,The Contemporary Literature Press, under the University of Bucharest
- A Manual for the Advanced Study of James Joyce’s Finnegans Wake in One Hundred Volumes by C. George Sandulescu and Lidia Vianu, including the full text of Finnegans Wake, line-numbered, The Contemporary Literature Press, under the University of Bucharest
- C. George Sandulescu, A Lexicon of Romanian in Finnegans Wake, The Contemporary Literature Press, under the University of Bucharest]
- C. George Sandulescu, A Lexicon of Common Scandinavian in Finnegans Wake, The Contemporary Literature Press, under the University of Bucharest]
- C. George Sandulescu, A Lexicon of Allusions and Motifs in Finnegans Wake, The Contemporary Literature Press, under the University of Bucharest]
- C. George Sandulescu, A Lexicon of "Small" Languages in Finnegans Wake, The Contemporary Literature Press, under the University of Bucharest]
- C. George Sandulescu, A Total Lexicon of Part Four of Finnegans Wake, The Contemporary Literature Press, under the University of Bucharest]
- C. George Sandulescu, UnEnglish English in Finnegans Wake. The First Hundred Pages. Pages 003 to 103, The Contemporary Literature Press]
- C. George Sandulescu, UnEnglish English in Finnegans Wake. The Second Hundred Pages. Pages 104 to 216, The Contemporary Literature Press]
- C. George Sandulescu, UnEnglish English in Finnegans Wake. Part Two of the Book. Pages 219 to 399, The Contemporary Literature Press]
- C. George Sandulescu, Lexicon Volume Ten. UnEnglish English in Finnegans Wake. The Last Two Hundred Pages. Parts Three and Four of Finnegans Wake. Pages 403 to 628, The Contemporary Literature Press]
- C. George Sandulescu, Lexicon Volume Eleven. Literary Allusions in Finnegans Wake, The Contemporary Literature Press]
- C. George Sandulescu, Finnegans Wake Motifs I, II, and III, The Contemporary Literature Press]
- C. George Sandulescu, Finnegans Wake without Tears. The Honuphrius & A Few Others FW Interludes properly paraphrased for the general public, The Contemporary Literature Press]
- C. George Sandulescu, Dublin English in the Wake, The Contemporary Literature Press]
- C. George Sandulescu, Oscar Wilde's Salome: 120 Years Old!, The Contemporary Literature Press]

== Language and linguistics ==
- coauthor of English Grammar, Editura Didactica si Pedagogica, Bucharest, 1963
- coauthor of Shakespeare and His Critics, Editura pentru Literatura Universala, Bucharest, 1963
- Constantin Sandulescu, Exercitii de gramatica engleza, Editura Stiintifica, Bucharest, 1964
- coauthor of Banking English, A Specialized Course in English, Tjänstemännens, Bildningsverksamhet, Stockholm, 1971
- coauthor of Banking English Workbook, A Collection of Exercises, TBV, Stockholm, 1971
- coeditor of Modern Language Teaching to Adults: Language for Special Purposes, AIMAV (Bruxelles) si DIDIER (Paris). 1973

== Papers in theoretical and applied linguistics ==
=== Theory of discourse: 1972 to 1978 ===
- InterDisciplinary Aspects of Discourse Analysis, 1974 – Paper given at the Congress of Applied Linguistics which took place in Stuttgart in the summer of 1974. Proceedings edited by Gerhard Nickel and Albert Raasch.
- Presupposition, Assertion and Discourse Structure, 1975 – Paper given at the Helsinki Conference, and published in Reports on Text Linguistics: Approaches to Word Order, edited by Nils-Erik Enkvist and Viljo Kohonen. Meddelanden från Åbo Akademi Forskningsinstitut, No. 8, pages 197 – 214.
- Displacement Constraints on Discourse, 1975 – Paper given at the Second Scandinavian Conference of Linguistics held at Lysebu (outside Oslo) between 19 and 20 April 1975; and published in: Papers from the Second Scandinavian Conference of Linguistics, Lysebu, 19–20 April 1975, edited by Even Hovdhougen; issued by the Department of Linguistics of the University of Oslo, Norway, 411 pages.
- Mapping Discourse Structure, 1976 – Paper given at the Third International Conference of Nordic and General Linguistics, held at the University of Texas at Austin between 5 and 9 April 1976, and published in The Nordic Languages and Modern Linguistics 3, Proceedings of the Third International Conference of Nordic and General Linguistics, edited by John Weinstock, pages 497–502.
- Theory & Practice in Analysing Discourse, 1976 – Paper given at the Stuttgart Congress of Applied Linguistics in 1976, and published in the Proceedings of the Fourth International Congress of Applied Linguistics, pages 349 to 365.
- Structuring Discourse Connectors, 1976 – Paper prepared for the Third Scandinavian Conference of Linguistics, which took place in Helsinki, in October 1976. Part Two of the present paper had by then already been submitted for presentation at the 1977 Vienna Congress of Linguists.
- Linguistic Intuition, 1976 – Paper given in March 1976 at the 27th Annual Georgetown University Round Table on Languages and Linguistics, that year devoted to "Semantics: Theory & Application", The 'English for Special Purposes' Section.
- Only Connect . . ., 1976 – Paper given by C. George SANDULESCU in 1976, at the Third Scandinavian Conference of Linguistics, which took place at Hanasaari, near Helsinki, in Finland, between 1 and 3 October 1976; the Proceedings, edited by Fred KARLSSON were issued by the Text Linguistics Research Group of the Academy of Finland, Turku/Åbo, 1976, 404+16 pages.

=== Language teaching principles: 1971 to 1978 ===
- Contrastive Analysis, 1971 – Paper given in English at the Nordic Summer University (Nordiska sommaruniversitetet) in August 1971 at their session in Jyväskylä, Finland, within the Section devoted to Språkbeskrivning (Language Description).
- Language for Special Purposes, 1973 – Published in Modern Language Teaching to Adults: Language for Special Purposes. edited by M. de Greve, M. Gorosch, C. G. Sandulescu and F.Van Passel. Being The Second AIMAV Seminar of ASLA, Stockholm, 27–30 April 1972. Printed by AIMAV in Bruxelles and DIDIER in Paris. 1973. Paperback. 290 pp. The above paper by C. George SANDULESCU appears in the book on pages 87 to 89.
- Anatomy of Motivation, 1974 – Paper given at the IATEFL Conference, London, January 1974; the account was published in the IATEFL Newsletter No. 33, May 1974.
- Readability, 1976 – Paper given at the Tenth Annual TESOL Convention (Teachers of English to Speakers of Other Languages), which took place in New York City from 1 to 7 March 1976. Published in the Conference Proceedings.
- Semiotics of Modern Language Teaching, 1972 – Paper given at the Third International Congress of Applied Linguistics, The Section of Modern Language Teaching for Adults, which took place in Copenhagen, Denmark, from 21 to 26 August 1972. Published in the Congress Proceedings.
- Mention versus Use, 1977 – Paper given at the Ninth International Conference of IATEFL (International Association of Teachers of English as a Foreign Language) held at Oxford in January 1977. Published in IATEFL Newsletter, The Bulletin of the International Association of Teachers of English as a Foreign Language, No. 51, January 1978, pages 31 to 34.
