= 1893 in Romania =

- Decades: 1870s; 1880s; 1890s; 1900s; 1910s
- See also: Other events of 1893; History of Romania; Timeline of Romanian history; Years in Romania

Events from the year 1893 in Romania.

== Incumbents ==
- King: Carol I.
- Prime Minister: Lascăr Catargiu.

== Births ==
- 13 August – Constantin Brăiloiu, composer and ethnomusicologist (died 1958).
- 15 October – Carol II, King from 8 June 1930 to 6 September 1940 (died 1953).
