= 1964 in Romania =

- Decades: 1940s; 1950s; 1960s; 1970s; 1980s
- See also: Other events of 1964; History of Romania; Timeline of Romanian history; Years in Romania

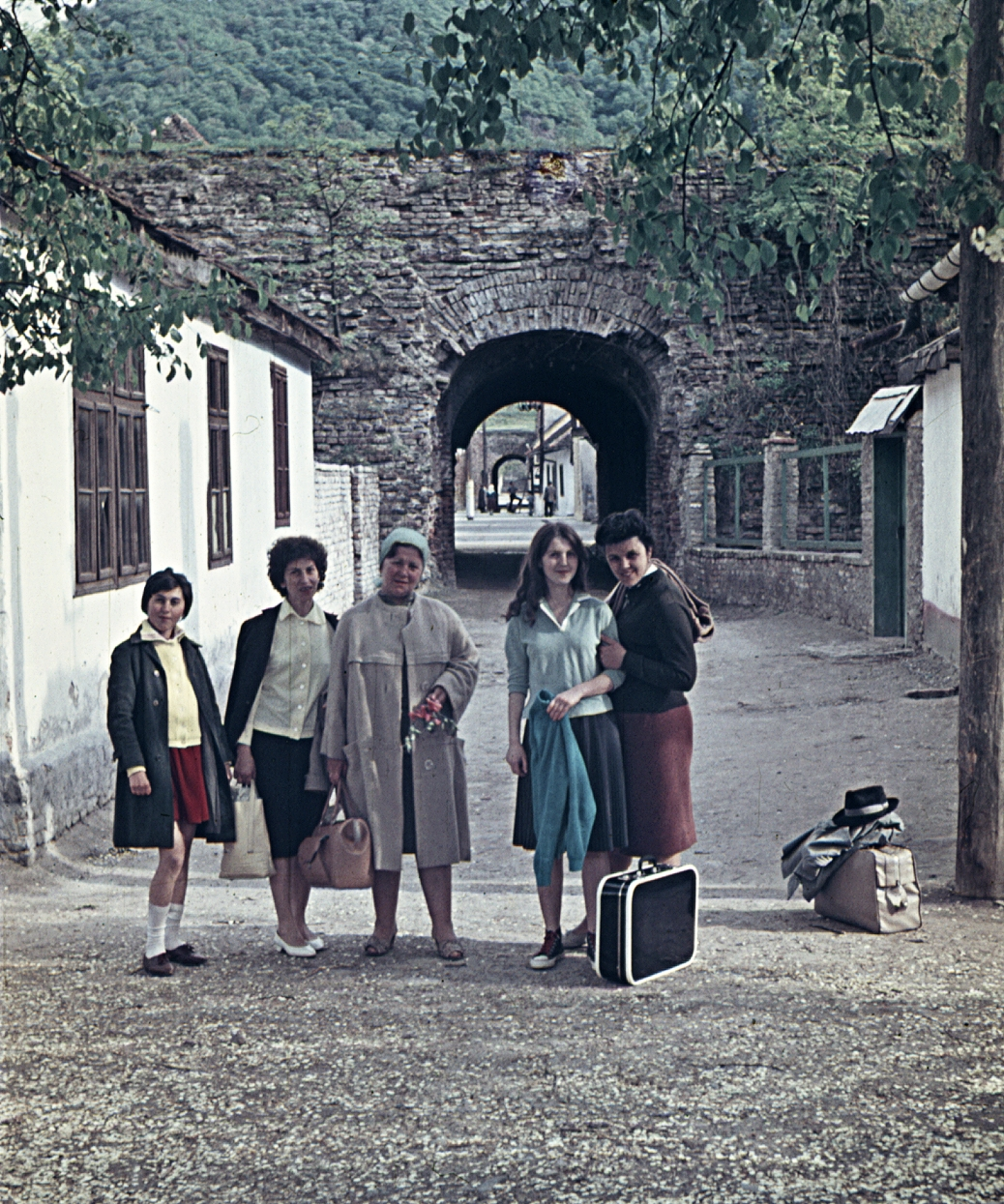

Events from the year 1964 in Romania. The year saw increasing separation from Soviet influence.

== Incumbents ==
- President of the State Council and General Secretary of the Romanian Communist Party: Gheorghe Gheorghiu-Dej.
- Prime Minister: Ion Gheorghe Maurer.

== Events ==
- 3 March – Gheorghe Gheorghiu-Dej travels to Beijing for seven days negotiation with the Chinese government.
- 22 April – The Central Committee of the Romanian Workers' Party declares independence from the Communist Party in the Soviet Union. This was the first post-war declaration of Romanian economic, political and social sovereignty from the Soviet Union.
- 5 May – Romania establishes diplomatic relations at an embassy level with Tanganyika, opening an embassy in Dar es Salaam.
- 4 August – Alexandru Todea has his life sentence remitted and is released from prison. He goes on to become Archbishop of Făgăraș and Alba Iulia.
- 7 September – Construction commences on the Iron Gate Hydroelectric Power Station.

== Births ==
- 20 January – Vasile Tomoiagă, rower, silver medal winner at the 1984 and 1988 Summer Olympics.
- 28 January –Rozalia Husti, fencer, silver medal winner at the 1984 Summer Olympics.
- 12 February – Dumitrița Turner, artistic gymnast, silver medal winner at the 1980 Summer Olympics.
- 4 March – Emilia Eberle, gymnast, silver medal winner at the 1980 Olympics.
- 12 March – Alina Mungiu-Pippidi, political scientist, academic, journalist and writer.
- 22 March – Ioana Badea, rower, gold medal winner at the 1984 Olympics.
- 10 April – Elena Georgescu, coxswain, gold medal winner at the 1996, 2000 and 2004 Summer Olympics.
- 13 July – Princess Maria, youngest daughter of King Michael I and Queen Anne.
- 26 July – Dana Dragomir, pan flute player and composer.
- 8 August – Elisabeta Tufan, fencer, silver medal winner at the 1984 Summer Olympics.
- 2 September – Ruxandra Donose, mezzo-soprano.
- 26 October – Elisabeta Lipă, rower, gold medal winner at the 1984, 1992, 1996, 2000 and 2004 Summer Olympics, as well as two silver and one bronze.
- 4 December – Sevil Shhaideh, economist and politician.

== Deaths ==
- 2 March – Nicolae Vasilescu-Karpen, engineer and physicist (born 1870).
- 17 March – Păstorel Teodoreanu, humorist, poet, and gastronome (born 1894).
- 11 April – Alexandru Ghika, mathematician, founder of the Romanian school of functional analysis (born 1902).
- 2 June – Dumitru Caracostea, folklorist, literary historian, and critic (born 1879).
- 6 June – Vasile Atanasiu, general in World War II (born 1886).
- 6 July – Ion Vinea, poet and journalist (born 1895).
- 25 July – Cornel Medrea, sculptor (born 1888).
- 10 August – Visarion Puiu, metropolitan bishop of the Romanian Orthodox Church (born 1879).
- 1 September – George Georgescu, composer (born 1887).
- 18 October – Maria Antonescu, socialite and philanthropist (born 1892).
