= 1959 in Romania =

- Decades: 1930s; 1940s; 1950s; 1960s; 1970s
- See also: Other events of 1959; History of Romania; Timeline of Romanian history; Years in Romania

Events from the year 1959 in Romania. During the year, the country hosted the first International Mathematical Olympiad.

== Incumbents ==
- President of the Provisional Presidium of the Republic: Ion Gheorghe Maurer.
- Prime Minister: Chivu Stoica.
- General Secretary of the Romanian Communist Party: Gheorghe Gheorghiu-Dej.

== Events ==
- 31 January – Sandu Tudor begins a 40-year sentence at Jilava Prison for "conspiracy against the social order" and "intense activity against the working class".
- 29 May – Sociologists form a National Sociological Committee, which soon joins the International Sociological Association, to encourage the development of the discipline.
- July – Babeș-Bolyai University is formed in Cluj by the merger of Babeș and Bolyai Universities, which had as their languages of instruction Romanian and Hungarian respectively.
- 23 July – Brașov and Bucharest jointly host the first International Mathematical Olympiad, which runs until 31 July.
- 28 July – The Ioanid Gang allegedly steal 1.6 million lei from a National Bank of Romania armored car.
- 28 October – The Grand National Assembly adopts Decree No 410 which abolishes many monasteries, including Radu Vodă Monastery.

== Art and literature ==
- Îndrăzneala (The Daring), a novel by Marin Preda, is published.

== Cinema and theatre ==
- Eugène Ionesco writes the play Rhinoceros.
- Mingea (The Ball), directed by Andrei Blaier and Sinișa Ivetici, is released. It is shown at the 1st Moscow International Film Festival.

== Births ==
- 26 January – Mircea Fulger, boxer, bronze medal winner at the 1984 Summer Olympics.
- 4 February – Monica Macovei, politician and Minister of Justice between 2004 and 2007.
- 20 March – Felicia Filip, operatic soprano.
- 5 April – Florica Prevenda, artist.
- 28 April – Lucia Romanov-Stark, tennis player.
- 1 June – Cristian Popescu, poet (died 1995).
- 13 June – Klaus Iohannis, President of Romania from 2014.
- 14 June – Alexandru Darie, theater director (died 2019).
- 17 September – Florentin Crihălmeanu, Romanian Greek Catholic bishop of Cluj-Gherla (died 2021).
- 21 September – Crin Antonescu, politician, served as Acting President of Romania and President of the Senate.
- 6 November – Marin Gheorghe, rower, silver medal winner at the 1992 Summer Olympics.

== Deaths ==
- 30 January – Elena Săcălici, gymnast, member of the team that won the first Olympic and world team bronze medal for Romania, at the 1956 Summer Olympics (born 1935).
- 11 February – Ioan Bălan, Bishop of the Romanian Greek Catholic Church (born 1880).
- 13 May – Emil Hațieganu, politician and jurist (born 1878).
- 24 July – Mihail Lascăr, general during World War II and Minister of Defense from 1946 to 1947 (born 1889).
- 24 November – Ion Gigurtu, far-right politician, officer, engineer, and industrialist who served as Prime Minister from 4 July to 4 September 1940, died at Râmnicu Sărat Prison (born 1886).
- 29 December – Gheorghe N. Leon, economist and politician, died at Râmnicu Sărat Prison (born 1888).
