= 1962 in Romania =

- Decades: 1940s; 1950s; 1960s; 1970s; 1980s
- See also: Other events of 1962; History of Romania; Timeline of Romanian history; Years in Romania

Events from the year 1962 in Romania. The year saw the end of the collectivization of agriculture and increasing de-satellization of Communist Romania as the country last publicly supported the Soviet Union against China and took part is Warsaw Pact army exercises.

== Incumbents ==
- President of the State Council and General Secretary of the Romanian Communist Party: Gheorghe Gheorghiu-Dej.
- Prime Minister: Ion Gheorghe Maurer.

== Events ==
- 3 March – As part of the de-satellization of Communist Romania, the country declares official and public support for the Soviet Union against the People's Republic of China for the last time in a letter.
- April 28 – At a session of the Great National Assembly, Gheorghe Gheorghiu-Dej declares that the collectivization of agriculture is complete.
- 19 September – The last joint exercise between the Romanian Land Forces and the armies of other Warsaw Pact members ends.

== Cinema and theatre ==
- Allo Allo, directed by Ion Popescu-Gopo, debuts in Romania.
- A Bomb Was Stolen (Romanian: S-a furat o bombă), directed by Popescu-Gopo, is nominated for the Palme d'Or at the 1962 Cannes Film Festival.

== Births ==
- 2 January – Cristieana Cojocaru, winner of bronze in the hurdles at the 1984 Summer Olympics.
- 7 January – Florica Lavric, rower, gold medal winner at the 1984 Summer Olympics (died 2014).
- 26 February – Viorica Ioja, rower, gold medal winner at the 1984 Summer Olympics.
- 5 May – Rodica Arba, rower, winner of seven medals including gold at the 1984 and 1988 Summer Olympics.
- 28 June – Anișoara Cușmir-Stanciu, long jumper, gold medal winner at the 1984 Summer Olympics.
- 10 August – Horia Gârbea, playwright, poet and novelist.
- 28 October – Liviu Dragnea, engineer and politician, leader of the Social Democratic Party between 2016 and 2019.
- 9 November – Marioara Popescu, rower gold medal winner at the 1984 and 1996 Summer Olympics.
- 11 November – Ildikó Raimondi, soprano.

== Deaths ==
- 6 May – Virginia Andreescu Haret, architect (born 1894).
- 29 May – Gheorghe Arsenescu, officer who led a group of anti-communist resistance fighters, executed at Jilava Prison (born 1907).
- 2 September – Natalia Negru, poet and writer (born 1882).
- 17 November – Sandu Tudor, poet, journalist, theologian, and Orthodox monk, who died in Aiud Prison (born 1896).
- 12 December – Felix Aderca, modernist writer (born 1891).
