= 1956 in Romania =

- Decades: 1930s; 1940s; 1950s; 1960s; 1970s
- See also: Other events of 1956; History of Romania; Timeline of Romanian history; Years in Romania

Events from the year 1956 in Romania. At the University of Bucharest, students demonstrated in support of the Hungarian Revolution. The year also saw the end of the last SovRom joint enterprises and the first broadcast from TVR, Romania's first TV network.

== Incumbents ==
- President of the Provisional Presidium of the Republic: Petru Groza.
- Prime Minister: Chivu Stoica.
- General Secretary of the Romanian Communist Party: Gheorghe Gheorghiu-Dej.

== Events ==
- 10 February – Romania signs a reciprocal arrangement with Yugoslavia regarding air routes.
- 26 June – Following a three day visit from Yugoslavia's President Josip Broz Tito, a joint communique is signed between Romania and Yugoslavia promoting nuclear disarmament and free trade.
- 8 July – The Romania women's national handball team are declared World Champions in Frankfurt.
- 22 October – The last SovRom joint enterprises with the Soviet Union, Sovromcuarț and Sovrompetrol, are dissolved.
- 5 November – Students at the University of Bucharest protest in support of the Hungarian Revolution. The movement is repressed.
- 22 November – Imre Nagy arrives in Bucharest after being arrested, ending the Hungarian Revolution.
- 31 November – The first TV network in the country, Televiziunea Română, (TVR) makes its first broadcast.

== Births ==
- 10 February – Mariana Marin, poet (died 2003).
- 24 February – Sanda Toma, rower, gold medalist at the 1980 Summer Olympics.
- 28 February – Paul Pîrșan, agronomist.
- 10 April – Ioan Sauca, priest of the Romanian Orthodox Church, academic, and acting general secretary of the World Council of Churches.
- 19 April – Sofia Corban-Banovici, rower, gold medalist at the 1984 Summer Olympics.
- 12 May – Ilan Gilon, Israeli politician (died 2022)
- 1 June – Mircea Cărtărescu, poet, writer and literary critic.
- 19 August – Titu Andreescu, mathematician.
- 11 October – Nicolae Ungureanu, footballer (died 2026)
- 27 October – Valentin Radu, artistic director and conductor.
- 27 December – Doina Melinte, athlete, gold medalist at the 1984 Summer Olympics (died 2008).

== Deaths ==
- 12 March – Emil Calmanovici, engineer, businessman, and communist militant, died in Aiud Prison (born 1896).
- 22 April – Otto Roth, Commissioner-in-Chief of the Banat Republic (born 1884).
- 5 May – Miklós Nyiszli, Hungarian survivor of the Holocaust (born 1901).
- 22 May – Ion Călugăru, writer, playwright and journalist (born 1901).
- 17 June – Artur Văitoianu, general in World War I who served as a Prime Minister of Romania in 1919 (born 1864).
- 6 September – Abraham Leib Zissu, political essayist and writer (born 1888).
- 22 December – Nicolae Labiș, poet (born 1935).
