= 1963 in Romania =

- Decades: 1940s; 1950s; 1960s; 1970s; 1980s
- See also: Other events of 1963; History of Romania; Timeline of Romanian history; Years in Romania

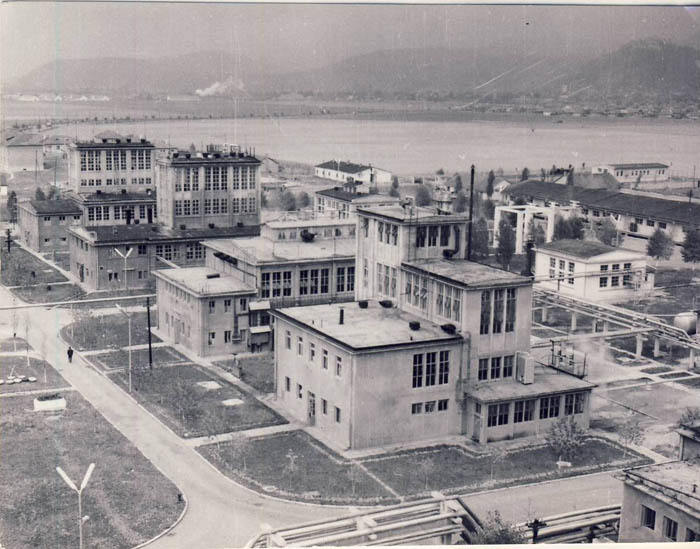
Râșnov chemical plant, 1963

Events from the year 1963 in Romania. The year saw the continued de-satellization of Communist Romania.

== Incumbents ==
- President of the State Council and General Secretary of the Romanian Communist Party: Gheorghe Gheorghiu-Dej..
- Prime Minister: Ion Gheorghe Maurer.

== Events ==
- 15 May – The film Codine, directed by Henri Colpi, wins Best Screenplay at the 1963 Cannes Film Festival.
- 30 November – The Romanian and Yugoslavian governments agree to develop the Iron Gate Hydroelectric Power Station.
- Unknown – As part of de-satellization from the Soviet Union, street names with Soviet influences are renamed. For example, Strada Kirov becomes Strada Onesti.

== Births ==
- 5 July – Adriana Bazon, rower, silver medal winner at the 1984, 1988 and 1992 Summer Olympics.
- 17 August – Ruxandra Cesereanu, poet and writer.
- 30 September – Lucia Sauca, rower, silver medal winner at the 1984 Summer Olympics.
- 16 December – Viorica Dăncilă, Prime Minister between 2018 and 2019.

== Deaths ==
- 5 February – Ion Mihalache, politician, the founder and leader of the Peasants' Party, died at Râmnicu Sărat Prison (born 1882).
- 9 May – Alexandru Rusu, bishop of the Greek-Catholic Church, died at Gherla Prison, beatified in 2019 (born 1884).
- 22 June – Maria Tănase, singer and actor (born 1913).
- 30 September – Paul Alexiu, major-general during World War II (born 1893).
