= 1958 in Romania =

- Decades: 1930s; 1940s; 1950s; 1960s; 1970s
- See also: Other events of 1958; History of Romania; Timeline of Romanian history; Years in Romania

Events from the year 1958 in Romania. The year saw the end of the Soviet occupation of Romania with the last Soviet troops leaving the country.

== Incumbents ==
- President of the Provisional Presidium of the Republic:
  - Petru Groza (until 7 January).
  - Ion Gheorghe Maurer (from 11 January).
- Prime Minister: Chivu Stoica.
- General Secretary of the Romanian Communist Party: Gheorghe Gheorghiu-Dej.

== Events ==
- 20 February – A Hungarian delegation, including János Kádár, visits Romania. They make explicit that Hungary has no territorial claims over Hungarian-speaking part of the country.
- 27 May – Soviet Premier Nikita Khrushchev declares that Soviet troops will withdraw from Romania.
- 6 June – The start of a three-day trial of four students who organised a conference to celebrate the 500th anniversary of the crowning of Stephen the Great. They are found guilty and imprisoned until 1964.
- 21 July – In response to the Hungarian Revolution of 1956, the Great National Assembly passes Decree 318, stating that contacting foreigners to declare Romania neutral carries the death penalty.
- 25 July – The last Soviet troops leave Romania, ending the Soviet occupation.
- 14 November – Romania establishes its first diplomatic relations at the embassy level with a sub-Saharan country, Guinea.
- Unknown – The last Csángós school is closed as part of the Romanianization of Western Moldavia.

== Art and literature ==
- Ciulinii Bărăganului, a Franco-Romanian film directed by Louis Daquin and Gheorghe Vitanidis, based on a novel of the same title by Panait Istrati, was nominated for the Golden Palm award at the 1958 Cannes Film Festival.

== Births ==
- 10 February – Olga Homeghi, rower, gold medal winner at the 1984 and 1988 Summer Olympics.
- 9 March – Cornelia Catangă, lăutari musician (died 2021).
- 25 June – Gigi Becali, businessman and politician.
- 29 June – Oana Lungescu, journalist and NATO principal spokesperson.
- 4 July – Elena Horvat, rower, gold medal winner at the 1984 Summer Olympics.
- 23 August – Iosif Matula, politician and member of the European Parliament.
- 6 November – Elena Bondar, rower, bronze medal winner at the 1980 Summer Olympics.

== Deaths ==
- 7 January – Petru Groza, President since 1952 and Prime Minister between 1945 and 1952 (born 1884).
- 17 February – Natalie Bierle, film actress who used the pseudonym Tala Birell (born 1907).
- 26 May – Constantin Cantacuzino, aviator, the leading Romanian fighter ace in World War II (born 1905).
- 24 August –Veronica Antal, professed member of the Secular Franciscan Order, the first Romanian woman to be beatified, on 22 September 2018 (born 1935).
- 2 September – Iosif Capotă, physician who led a group of anti-communist resistance fighters, executed at Gherla Prison (born 1912).
- 7 December – Constantin Brăiloiu, composer and ethnomusicologist (born 1893).
