= 1966 in Romania =

- Decades: 1940s; 1950s; 1960s; 1970s; 1980s
- See also: Other events of 1966; History of Romania; Timeline of Romanian history; Years in Romania

This is a list of 1966 events that occurred in the Socialist Republic of Romania.

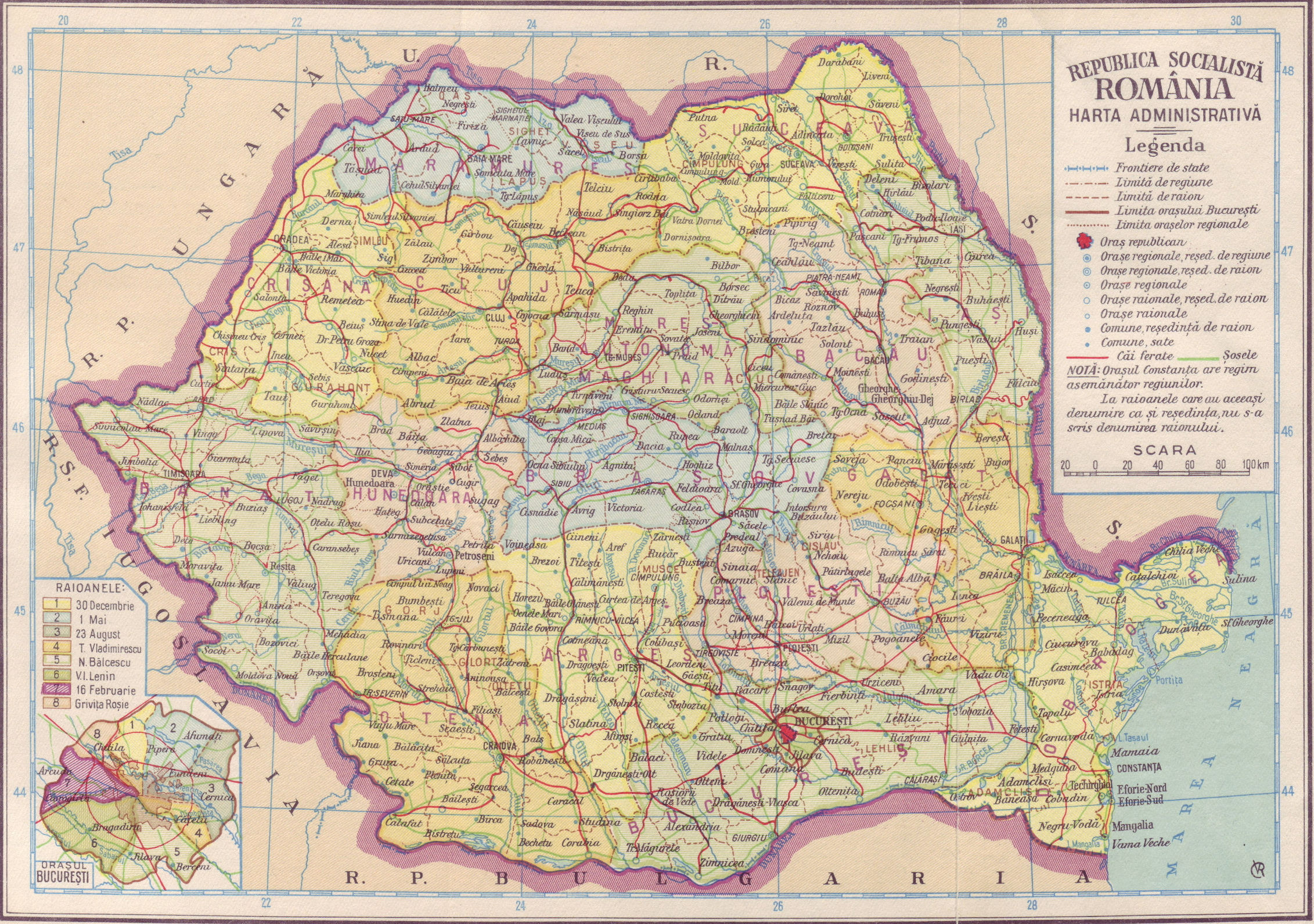
The Socialist Republic of Romania in 1966

== Incumbents ==
- President: Nicolae Ceaușescu
- Prime Minister: Ion Gheorghe Maurer

== Events ==
=== March ===
- March 15 – The decennial census is held in Romania, and counted the population of Romania on that date.

=== June ===
- June 19-25 – 1966 World Ninepin Bowling Classic Championships is held in Bucharest.

=== July ===
- July 7 – At the Warsaw Pact conference in Bucharest, Romania makes a joint declaration along with the European Communist nations to send volunteers to Vietnam if requested for such support by the North Vietnamese government.

=== August ===
- August 11 – A Lisunov Li-2 airliner, operated by Tarom crashed in the Lotriora Valley in Romania, near the city of Sibiu, killing all 24 people on board.

=== October ===
- October 1-9 – EuroBasket Women 1966 of the European Women Basketball Championship is held in Romania.
- Decree 770 is personally sanctioned by Ceaușescu, and signed by the communist Romanian government in 1967.

== Births ==
=== February ===
- February 11 –Cristina Elena Grigoraș, retired Romanian artistic gymnast

=== September ===
- September 6 – Emil Boc, 61st Prime Minister of Romania

== Deaths ==
=== March ===
- March 9 – Duiliu Marcu, architect (born 1885).

=== August ===
- August 28 – Leontin Sălăjan, Communist military and political leader (born 1913).

=== October ===
- October 6 – Mitchell Fields (Mendel Feldman), 65, Romanian-American sculptor.
