= 1957 in Romania =

- Decades: 1930s; 1940s; 1950s; 1960s; 1970s
- See also: Other events of 1957; History of Romania; Timeline of Romanian history; Years in Romania

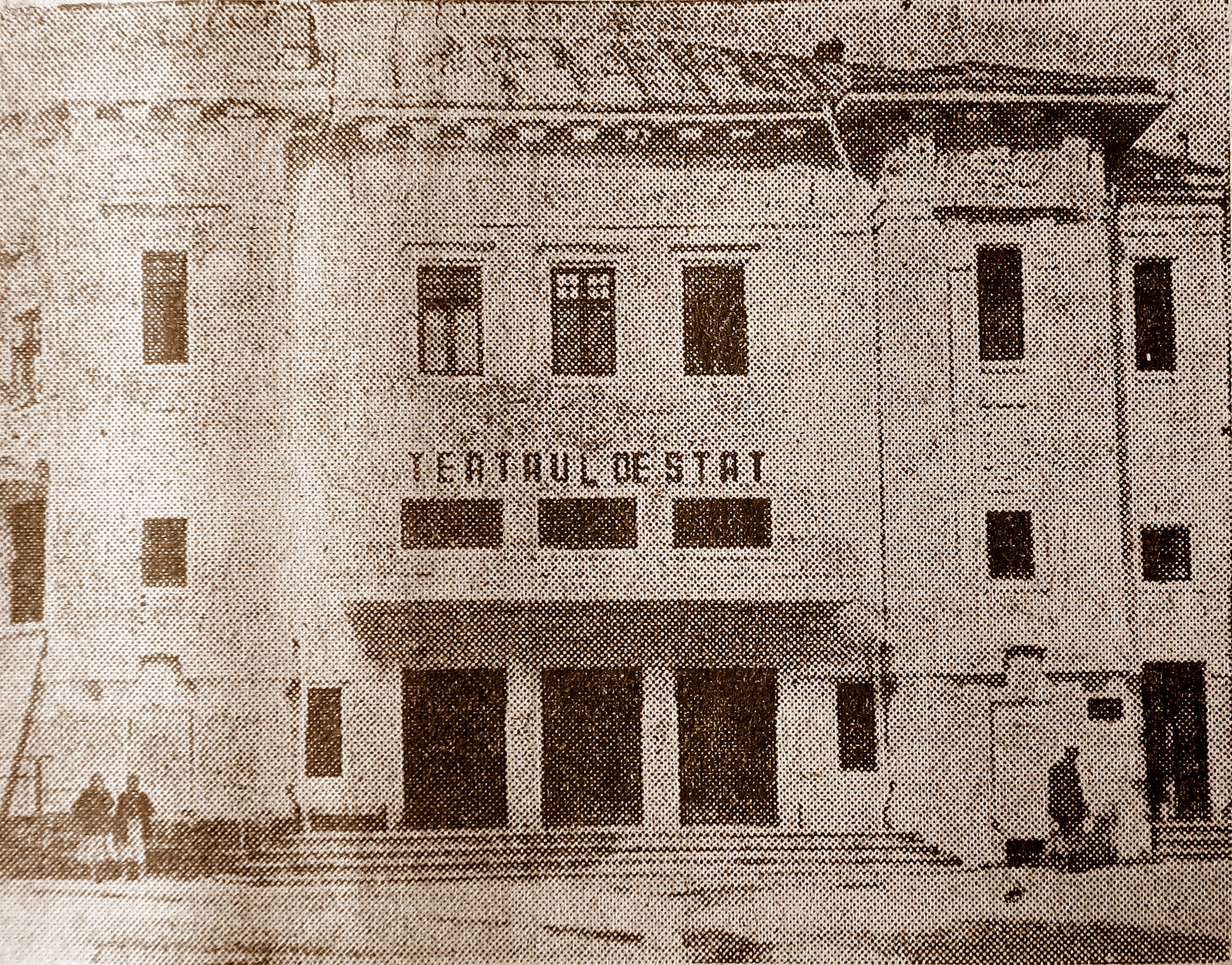

Events from the year 1957 in Romania. During the year, Romania hosted the first European competition for female artistic gymnastics. The country enacted laws to ban prostitution and slavery, and provide for abortion on demand. Notable deaths include the sculptor Constantin Brâncuși.

== Incumbents ==
- President of the Provisional Presidium of the Republic: Petru Groza.
- Prime Minister: Chivu Stoica.
- General Secretary of the Romanian Communist Party: : Gheorghe Gheorghiu-Dej.

== Events ==
- 3 February – Parliamentary elections are held.
- 25 May – The first European Women's Artistic Gymnastics Championships are held in Bucharest. These are the first European competition for female artistic gymnastics.
- 16 July – Article 433 of Decree 324 bans prostitution. The remainder of the legislation gives additional powers to the secret police.
- 25 September – Romania is the first country to legalise abortion on request with Decree 463.
- 19 December – Decree 375 abolishes slavery, trafficking and practices similar to slavery.

== Births ==
- 2 February – Ion Popa, rower, medal winner for Australia at the 1984 Summer Olympics.
- 15 February – Doina Ruști, novelist and writer.
- 3 October – Hannah Monyer, neurobiologist.
- 2 June – Valeria Răcilă, rower, gold medal winner at the 1984 Summer Olympics.
- 10 July – Rodica Radian-Gordon, Romanian born diplomat, first Israeli female Ambassador to Spain.
- 20 August – Sorin Antohi, historian, essayist, and journalist.
- 26 November – Valer Toma, rower, gold medal winner at the 1984 Summer Olympics.

== Deaths ==
- 6 March – Constantin Rădulescu-Motru, philosopher, academic, and politician, President of the Romanian Academy from 1938 to 1941 (born 1868).
- 16 March – Constantin Brâncuși, painter, photographer and sculptor (born 1876).
- 26 March – Gheorghe Tătărescu, twice Prime Minister of Romania (1934–1937; 1939–1940) (born 1886).
- 13 May – Elisa Brătianu, expert on Romanian embroidery and participant in the Inter-Allied Women's Conference of 1919 (born 1870).
- 22 May – George Bacovia, symbolist poet (born 1881).
- 18 August – George Tutoveanu, poet (born 1872).
- 2 September – Constantin Titel Petrescu, politician and lawyer, the leader of the Romanian Social Democratic Party (born 1888).
- 23 October – Mihai Codreanu, poet (born 1876).
- 27 December – Nutzi Acontz, painter (born 1894).
