= 1965 in Romania =

- Decades: 1940s; 1950s; 1960s; 1970s; 1980s
- See also: Other events of 1965; History of Romania; Timeline of Romanian history; Years in Romania

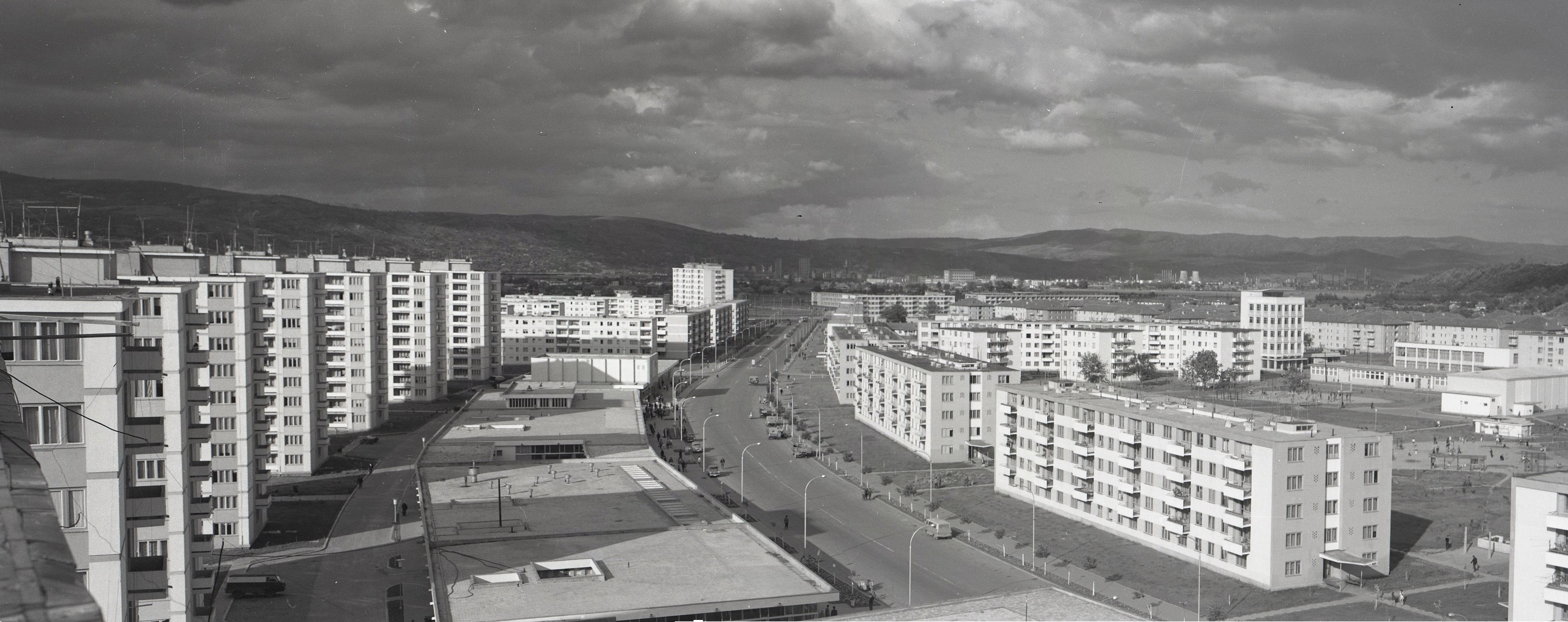
Housing block in Romania, circa 1965

This is a list of 1965 events that occurred in the Socialist Republic of Romania.

== Incumbents ==
- President: Gheorghe Gheorghiu-Dej Ending –19 March 1965; then Nicolae Ceaușescu Beginning –22 March 1965
- Prime Minister: Ion Gheorghe Maurer

== Events ==
=== March ===
- 22 March – Nicolae Ceaușescu becomes the first secretary of the Romanian Communist Party, after the sudden death of previous leader Gheorghe Gheorghiu Dej on 19 March that year.

== Births ==
=== February ===
- 5 February – Gheorghe Hagi, Romanian footballer, manager and club owner
- 27 February – Anda-Louise Bogza, Romanian operatic soprano (d. 2025)

=== April ===
- 30 April – Dorina Mitrea, Romanian-American mathematician.

=== May ===
- 16 May – Rodica Dunca, Romanian artistic gymnast

=== June ===
- 22 June – George Marinescu, Romanian mathematician.

=== December ===
- 6 December – Cornel Mihai Ungureanu, Romanian novelist and journalist

== Deaths ==
=== March ===
- 12 March – George Călinescu, literary critic (born 1899).
- 19 March – Gheorghe Gheorghiu-Dej, Romanian communist leader, 47th Prime Minister of Romania (born 1901).

=== April ===
- 22 April – Petre Antonescu, Romanian architect (b. 1873).

=== December ===
- 11 December – George Constantinescu, Romanian scientist (b. 1881)
