= 1967 in Romania =

- Decades: 1940s; 1950s; 1960s; 1970s; 1980s
- See also: Other events of 1967; History of Romania; Timeline of Romanian history; Years in Romania

This is a list of 1967 events that occurred in the Socialist Republic of Romania.

== Incumbents ==
- President: Nicolae Ceaușescu
- Prime Minister: Ion Gheorghe Maurer

== Events ==
=== January ===
- January 5 – Romania and Spain sign a consular and commercial agreement.
- January 31 – Romania establishes diplomatic relations with West Germany.

=== September ===
- September 19 – Former Foreign Minister Corneliu Mănescu of Romania was elected as the first President of the United Nations General Assembly to represent a Communist nation.

=== December ===
- December 9 – Nicolae Ceaușescu, the Secretary-General of the Romanian Communist Party, is elected as the new President of Romania by unanimous vote of the nation's 451-member Grand National Assembly.

== Births ==
=== March ===
- March 6 – Mihai Tudose, Romanian politician and former Prime Minister of Romania.
- March 30 – Albert-László Barabási, Romanian-born Hungarian-American physicist.

=== May ===
- May 6 – Daniel Tătaru, Romanian mathematician at the University of California, Berkeley.

=== July ===
- July 16 – Mihaela Stănuleț, retired Romanian artistic gymnast

=== October ===
- October 6 – Attila Ambrus, Romanian-born Hungarian bank robber and professional ice hockey player.

=== December ===
- December 22 – Dan Petrescu, Romanian footballer

== Deaths ==
=== June ===
- June 8 – Otilia Cazimir, poet, prose writer, translator, and publicist (born 1894).

=== July ===
- July 3 – Ioan Lupaș, historian, academic, politician, Orthodox theologian, and priest; member of the Romanian Academy (born 1880).
- July 14 – Tudor Arghezi (Ion N. Theodorescu), Romanian novelist and poet (born 1880).

=== October ===
- October 15 – Ștefan S. Nicolau, physician, titular member of the Romanian Academy (born 1896).
