= 1927 in Romania =

- Decades: 1900s; 1910s; 1920s; 1930s; 1940s
- See also: Other events of 1927; History of Romania; Timeline of Romanian history; Years in Romania

Events from the year 1927 in Romania. The year was marked by the death of King Ferdinand and the ascension of King Michael I. The year also saw the further development of the Polish–Romanian alliance and the start of the rise of the Iron Guard.

== Incumbents ==
- King:
  - Ferdinand I (until 20 July).
  - Michael I (from 20 July).
- Prime Minister:
  - Alexandru Averescu (until 4 June).
  - Barbu Știrbey (between 4 and 21 June).
  - Ion I. C. Brătianu (between 21 June and 24 November).
  - Vintilă Brătianu (from 24 November).

== Events ==
- 9 February – Romania and Poland ratify the Treaty on Mutual Assistance against Aggression and on Military Aid, to build the Polish–Romanian alliance and protect against potential aggression from the Soviet Union.
- 7 May – The Romanian Social Democratic Party (Partidul Social Democrat din Român is formed from those remaining members of the Socialist Party of Romania who did not align with the Communist International.
- 24 July – The Legion of the Archangel Michael, a precursor to the Iron Guard, is founded by Corneliu Zelea Codreanu.

== Art and literature ==
- Concert din Muzică de Bach (A Concert of Bach's Music), a novel by Hortensia Papadat-Bengescu.
- Desenuri tragice (Tragic Sketches), a short story collection by Hortensia Papadat-Bengescu.
- Cuvinte Potrivite ("Fitting Words" or "Suitable Words"), collected poems by Tudor Arghezi.

== Births ==
- 1 May – Annie Bentoiu, writer and translator (died 2015).

== Deaths ==
- 26 June – Vasile Pârvan, archaeologist and historian (born 1882).
- 20 July – King Ferdinand (born 1865).
- 9 November – Ion I. C. Brătianu, Prime Minister of Romania for five terms (born 1864).
