= 1883 in Romania =

- Decades: 1860s; 1870s; 1880s; 1890s; 1900s
- See also: Other events of 1883; History of Romania; Timeline of Romanian history; Years in Romania

Events from the year 1883 in Romania.

== Incumbents ==
- King: Carol I.
- Prime Minister: Ion Brătianu

== Events ==
- 18 August – Ion Brătianu signs the secret Romanian-Austro-Hungarian Alliance Treaty, which aligns the country with the Triple Alliance.
