= 1882 in Romania =

- Decades: 1860s; 1870s; 1880s; 1890s; 1900s
- See also: Other events of 1882; History of Romania; Timeline of Romanian history; Years in Romania

Events from the year 1882 in Romania. The year saw the departure of the Thetis, carrying Romanian Jews to Palestine.

== Incumbents ==
- King: Carol I.
- Prime Minister: Ion Brătianu

== Events ==
- 18 August – The passenger ship Thetis departs carrying Romanian Jews to Palestine as part of the First Aliyah. They found Rosh Pinna and Zikhron Ya'akov.

== Births ==
- 18 February – Ion Mihalache, politician, the founder and leader of the Peasants' Party (died 1963).
- 18 April – Victor Gomoiu, surgeon and founder of hospitals (died 1960).
- 20 April – Nicolae Ciupercă, lieutenant general who served in both world wars and was Minister of War from 1938 to 1939, anti-communist resistance leader (died 1950).
- 14 June – Ion Antonescu, military officer and marshal, Prime Minister and Conducător during most of World War II (died 1946).
- 18 June – Ștefania Mărăcineanu, physicist (died 1944).
- 28 September – Vasile Pârvan, archaeologist and historian (died 1927).
- 5 December – Natalia Negru, poet and writer (died 1962).

== Deaths ==
- 22 October – Ion Andreescu, painter (born 1850).
