= 1881 in Romania =

- Decades: 1860s; 1870s; 1880s; 1890s; 1900s
- See also: Other events of 1881; History of Romania; Timeline of Romanian history; Years in Romania

Events from the year 1881 in Romania. The year saw the end of the United Principalities of Moldavia and Wallachia and the creation of the Kingdom of Romania.

== Incumbents ==
- Domnitor: Carol I (until 14 March).
- King: Carol I (from 15 March).
- Prime Minister:
  - Ion Brătianu (until 9 April).
  - Dimitrie Brătianu (between 10 April and 8 June).
  - Ion Brătianu (from 9 June).

== Events ==
- 14 March – The Parliament of Romania declares the dissolution of the United Principalities of Moldavia and Wallachia and its replacement by the Kingdom of Romania.
- 18 April – A law is passed that enables the "expulsion by decree of the Council of Ministers of foreigners who might disturb the peace or threaten national safety".
- 10 May – Carol I is crowned King of Romania.
- 12 May – The Romanian National Party is founded by the union of the National Party of Romanians in Transylvania (Partidul Național al Românilor din Transilvania) and the National Party of Romanians in Banat and Hungary (Partidul Național al Românilor din Banat și Ungaria).
- 20 June – A law is passed to found first rural hospitals, initially in unoccupied monasteries until they could build their own buildings.

== Births ==
- 6 January – Ion Minulescu, avant-garde poet, novelist, and short story writer (died 1944).
- 22 May – Istrate Micescu, lawyer, died in Aiud Prison (died 1951).
- 2 June – Stan Ghițescu, politician who died at Sighet Prison (died 1952).
- 7 August – George Enescu, composer (died 1955).
- 31 October – Eugen Lovinescu, literary historian and critic (died 1943).
- 7 December – Alexandru Mavrodi, director of the National Theatre Bucharest (died 1934).

== Deaths ==
- 8 August – Alexandru G. Golescu, Prime Minister of the United Principalities of Moldavia and Wallachia (born 1819).
