= 1960 in Romania =

- Decades: 1940s; 1950s; 1960s; 1970s; 1980s
- See also: Other events of 1960; History of Romania; Timeline of Romanian history; Years in Romania

Events from the year 1960 in Romania. At the 1960 Summer Olympics, Iolanda Balaș wins the first Romanian Olympic gold medal.

== Incumbents ==
- President of the Provisional Presidium of the Republic: Ion Gheorghe Maurer.
- Prime Minister: Chivu Stoica.
- General Secretary of the Romanian Communist Party: Gheorghe Gheorghiu-Dej.

== Events ==
- 29 February – Six young writers are sentenced to prison and forced labour for "conspiracy and agitation".
- 8 September – Iolanda Balaș wins the first Romanian Olympic gold medal in the 1960 Summer Olympics.
- 26 October – Romania established diplomatic relations with Cuba.

== Art and literature ==
- Telegrame, starring Grigore Vasiliu Birlic, premiers in Romania. It is shown at the 1960 Cannes Film Festival.

== Births ==
- 4 January – Tecla Marinescu, kayaker, gold medal winner at the 1984 Summer Olympics.
- 10 February – Matei Machedon, mathematician.
- 1 June – Chira Apostol, rower, gold medal winner at the 1984 Summer Olympics.
- 22 June – Rovana Plumb, politician and president of the Social Democratic Party in 2014 and 2015.
- 3 August – Mariana Constantin, gymnast, silver medal winner at the 1976 Summer Olympics.
- 31 August – Vali Ionescu, long jumper, silver medal winner at the 1992 Summer Olympics.
- 13 November – Teodora Ungureanu, gymnast, thrice medal winner at the 1976 Summer Olympics.
- 1 December – Leontina Văduva, soprano.

== Deaths ==
- 8 January – Ion Codreanu, major general during World War II (born 1891).
- 6 February – Victor Gomoiu, surgeon and founder of hospitals (born 1882).
- 11 February – Clara Haskil, pianist (born 1895).
- 13 May – Andrei Magieru, theologian (born 1891).
- 3 June – Ana Pauker, communist leader and the world's first female foreign minister (born 1893).
