= 1961 in Romania =

- Decades: 1940s; 1950s; 1960s; 1970s; 1980s
- See also: Other events of 1961; History of Romania; Timeline of Romanian history; Years in Romania

Events from the year 1961 in Romania. The year saw the creation of the title of President of the State Council for the de facto head of state. The first office holder was Gheorghe Gheorghiu-Dej, who was already General Secretary of the Romanian Communist Party.

== Incumbents ==
- President of the Provisional Presidium of the Republic: Ion Gheorghe Maurer (until 21 March).
- President of the State Council: Gheorghe Gheorghiu-Dej (from 21 March).
- Prime Minister:
  - Chivu Stoica (until 21 March),
  - Ion Gheorghe Maurer (after 21 March).
- General Secretary of the Romanian Communist Party: Gheorghe Gheorghiu-Dej.

== Events ==
- 27 February – The border between Romania and the Soviet Union is agreed, including passing Snake Island to the Ukrainian Soviet Socialist Republic.
- 5 March – Parliamentary elections are held, with a single candidates from the People's Democratic Front per constituency.
- 21 March – The State Council of Romania is created and the first election for the President of the State Council, the de facto head of state, is held in the Great National Assembly with a single candidate, Gheorghe Gheorghiu-Dej, who is duly elected.
- 13 September – Romania signs the New York Convention on arbitration awards.

== Art and literature ==
- Thirst (Romanian: Setea), directed by Mircea Drăgan and Mihai Iacob, premiers in Romania and wins silver at the 2nd Moscow International Film Festival.

== Births ==
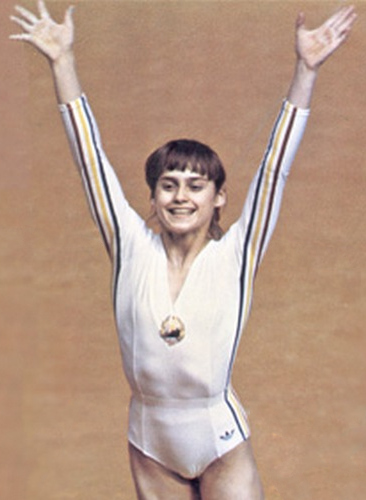
Nadia Comăneci in 1976

- 3 January – Carmen Tănase, film, TV and theatre actor.
- 4 June – Alexandru Zaharescu, mathematician.
- 16 June – Petru Iosub, rower, gold medal winner at the 1984 Summer Olympics.
- 22 June – Rovana Plumb, politician and president of the Social Democratic Party between 2014 and 2015.
- 10 September – Dimitrie Popescu, rower, silver medal winner at the 1984 and 1988 Summer Olympics and gold medal winner at the 1992 games.
- 15 September – Carmen Bunaciu, swimmer, gold medal winner at the 1984 Summer Olympics.
- 12 November – Nadia Comăneci, Romanian retired gymnast and a five-time Olympic gold medalist.

== Deaths ==
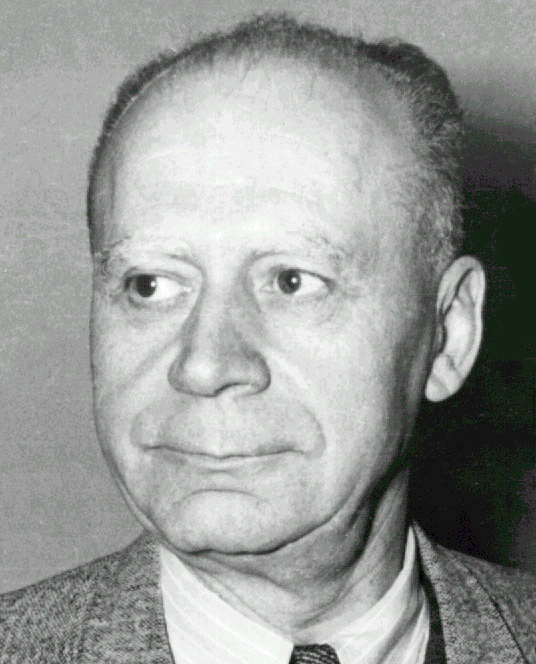
Lucian Blaga

- 3 January – Nicolae Hortolomei, surgeon and medical scientist (born 1885).
- 8 March – Gala Galaction, theologian and writer (born 1879).
- 9 April – Alexandru Kirițescu, playwright and journalist (born 1888).
- 6 May – Lucian Blaga, philosopher, poet, and playwright (born 1895).
- 4 June – Alice Voinescu, writer and essayist, first Romanian woman to become a Doctor of Philosophy (born 1885).
- 11 August – Dan Barbilian, known under the pen name Ion Barbu, mathematician and poet (born 1895).
- 18 September – Ilarion Felea, priest and theologian, who died at Aiud Prison (born 1903).
- 19 September – Lucia Sturdza-Bulandra, theatre actor and director (born 1873).
- 21 September – Claudia Millian, poet (born 1887).
- 19 October – Mihail Sadoveanu, novelist and political figure (born 1880).
