= Ion Codreanu =

Ion Codreanu may refer to:

- Ion Codreanu (general)
- Ion Codreanu (politician)
