= 1888 in Romania =

- Decades: 1860s; 1870s; 1880s; 1890s; 1900s
- See also: Other events of 1888; History of Romania; Timeline of Romanian history; Years in Romania

Events from the year 1888 in Romania. The year saw the first strike in the country, led by worker at Romanian Railways.

== Incumbents ==
- King: Carol I.
- Prime Minister:
  - Ion Brătianu (until 20 March).
  - Theodor Rosetti (from 23 March).

== Events ==
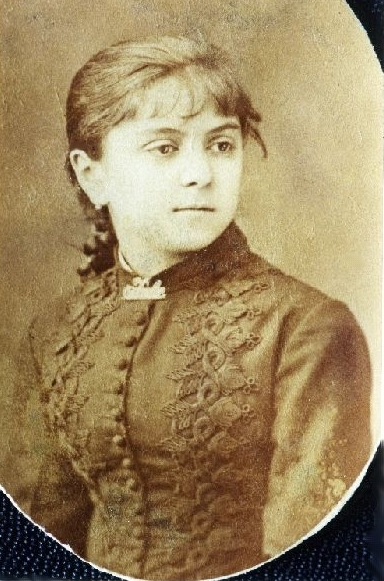
Iulia Hasdeu

- 23 January – Elections are held for the Chamber of Deputies. They run until 25 January and again from 12 to 14 October.
- 30 January – The first strike in Romania takes place when 300 workers at the Romanian Railways Workshop in Galați walk out in solidarity following the dismissal of a colleague, Ioan A. Ionescu.
- 2 July – Ion Luca Caragiale becomes Minister of Education and head of the National Theatre Bucharest. His appointment is controversial and short-lived.
- 13 August – A strike starts in the Railway Central Workshops in Bucharest, which runs until 25 August.
- Date unknown – Victor Babeș discovers the protozoan parasite Babesia.

== Births ==
- 25 January – Abraham Leib Zissu, political essayist and writer (died 1956).
- 5 February – Constantin Titel Petrescu, politician and lawyer, the leader of the Romanian Social Democratic Party (died 1957).
- 28 March – Alexandru Kirițescu, playwright and journalist (died 1961).
- 1 April – Mircea Florian, philosopher (died 1960).
- 17 May – Anton Durcovici, bishop of Iași in the Roman Catholic Church and martyr. He was beatified on 17 May 2014 (died 1951).

== Deaths ==
- 17 September – Iulia Hasdeu, poet, first Romanian woman to study at the University of Paris (born 1869).
