= 1885 in Romania =

- Decades: 1860s; 1870s; 1880s; 1890s; 1900s
- See also: Other events of 1885; History of Romania; Timeline of Romanian history; Years in Romania

Events from the year 1885 in Romania.

== Incumbents ==
- King: Carol I.
- Prime Minister: Ion Brătianu

== Events ==
- 25 April – The Romanian Orthodox Church is recognised as an autonomous Metropolis by Joachim IV of Constantinople.

== Births ==
- 14 January – Constantin Sănătescu, 44th prime minister of Romania (died 1947).
- 30 January – Iuliu Hossu, bishop of the Romanian Greek Catholic Church, beatified as a martyr (died 1970).
- 10 February – Alice Voinescu, writer and essayist, first Romanian woman to become a Doctor of Philosophy (died 1961).
- 22 April – Maria Teohari, credited as the first Romanian female astronomer (died 1975).
- 20 May – Alexander Löhr, General Commander in the South East of the Wehrmacht in World War II (died 1947).
- 27 November– Nicolae Hortolomei, surgeon and medical scientist (died 1961).
- 9 December – Daniel Ciugureanu, politician, Prime Minister of the Moldavian Democratic Republic in 1918, President of the Romanian Senate (died 1950).

== Deaths ==
- 8 April – Constantin Alexandru Rosetti, literary and political leader (born 1816).
