= 1887 in Romania =

- Decades: 1860s; 1870s; 1880s; 1890s; 1900s
- See also: Other events of 1887; History of Romania; Timeline of Romanian history; Years in Romania

Events from the year 1887 in Romania.

== Incumbents ==
- King: Carol I.
- Prime Minister: Ion Brătianu

== Births ==
- 21 February – Claudia Millian, poet (died 1961).
- 18 March – Ion Negulescu, lieutenant general during World War II, Minister of War in 1944–1945, (died 1949).
- 1 April – Aurel Aldea, lieutenant general during World War II, Interior Minister, and anti-communist resistance leader, died in Aiud Prison (died 1949).
- 13 May – Elena Caragiani-Stoenescu, first Romanian woman aviator (died 1929).
- 11 July – Nicolae Păiș, counter-admiral, undersecretary of state, who died at Aiud Prison (died 1952).
