= 1955 in Romania =

- Decades: 1930s; 1940s; 1950s; 1960s; 1970s
- See also: Other events of 1955; History of Romania; Timeline of Romanian history; Years in Romania

Events from the year 1955 in Romania. The year saw the country join the United Nations and Warsaw Pact, the latter as a founder. Amongst notable people who died during the year was composer George Enescu.

== Incumbents ==
- President of the Provisional Presidium of the Republic: Petru Groza.
- Prime Minister:
  - Gheorghe Gheorghiu-Dej (until 4 October).
  - Chivu Stoica (after 4 October).
- General Secretary of the Romanian Communist Party:
  - Gheorghe Apostol (until 30 September).
  - Gheorghe Gheorghiu-Dej (after 30 September).

== Events ==
- 14 February – Dissident émigrés seize the Romanian embassy in Bern, Switzerland, in protest against the government. The group surrender after two days.
- 14 May – The Warsaw Pact is signed with Romania a founding member.
- 15 May – Following the signing of the Austrian State Treaty, Gheorghiu-Dej announced that Soviet troops would remain in Romania as long as foreign soldiers continue to be stationed in West Germany.
- 23 August – During a visit by Soviet Premier Nikita Khrushchev, Gheorghiu-Dej proposes the withdrawal of Soviet troops. The request is not received favourably until 1958.
- 14 December – Romania joins the United Nations.

== Births ==
- 18 January – Rodica Simion, mathematician (died 2000).
- 31 January – Virginia Ruzici, tennis player, winner of the 1978 French Open.
- 14 April – Daniela Crăsnaru, poet.
- 19 April – Agafia Constantin, sprint canoeist, winner of the gold medal at the 1984 Summer Olympics.
- 4 May – Mihaela Runceanu, pop singer and vocal techniques teacher (died 1989).
- 7 May – Florența Crăciunescu, winner of the bronze medal in the discus at the 1984 Summer Olympics (died 2008).
- 23 May – Preda Mihăilescu, mathematician.
- 3 August – Renate Weber, lawyer, politician and first Romanian appointed as Chief of an EU Election Observation Mission.

== Deaths ==
- 15 January – Tit Liviu Chinezu, bishop of the Greek-Catholic Church, died in Sighet Prison (born 1904).
- 6 February – Constantin Argetoianu, politician, Prime Minister in 1939, died in Sighet Prison (born 1871).
- 4 May – George Enescu, composer (born 1881).
- 5 March – Hortensia Papadat-Bengescu, novelist (born 1876).
