= 1884 in Romania =

- Decades: 1860s; 1870s; 1880s; 1890s; 1900s
- See also: Other events of 1884; History of Romania; Timeline of Romanian history; Years in Romania

Events from the year 1884 in Romania.

== Incumbents ==
- King: Carol I.
- Prime Minister: Ion Brătianu.

== Events ==
- 12 July – The foundation stone of the National Bank of Romania is laid.
- Trăiască Regele ("Long live the King") becomes the new national and royal anthem.

== Births ==
- 26 January – Gheorghe Avramescu, general, died in Slovakia during World War II while in NKVD custody (died 1945).
- 10 August – Panait Istrati, writer (died 1935).
- 22 November – Alexandru Rusu, bishop of the Greek-Catholic Church, beatified in 2019 (died 1963).
- 7 December – Petru Groza, prime minister between 1945 and 1952 and president between 1952 and 1958 (died 1958).
