= Cornel Mihai Ungureanu =

Romanian novelist and journalist

Cornel Mihai Ungureanu (born December 6, 1965) is a Romanian novelist, journalist, and playwright. He is known for his literary fiction and cultural writing and has contributed to a number of Romanian magazines and literary journals.

== Biography ==
Ungureanu was born in Alexandria, Romania. He studied psychology at Spiru Haret University. He became a member of the Writers' Union of Romania (Uniunea Scriitorilor) in 2004 and has contributed to publications including Dilema, Mozaicul, Ramuri, Vatra, SpectActor, Familia, Tomis, Argeș, Timpul, Viața Românească, Respiro, and the cultural portal LiterNet.

== Career ==
Ungureanu's first article appeared in Dilema magazine in 1999, and his first short story was published in Ramuri that same year. His work spans prose, short stories, and journalistic writing. His published books include:

- Treptele din fața casei (literary essays, 2002)
- Pașii șarpelui (novel, 2003)
- Un fluture albastru (short stories, 2003)
- Noi, doi-trei la zece mii (novel, 2005)
- Recreații cu Babi (journalism, 2008)

Critical commentary on his work notes his attention to everyday life, oral narrative qualities, and a blend of realism with literary nuance.

== Literary prizes ==
- Petre Pandrea Prize for Literature (2003)
- Writers' Union of Romania Book of the Year (2005)
- Nominee for Romanian Club of Press Prize (2008)
