= 1886 in Romania =

- Decades: 1860s; 1870s; 1880s; 1890s; 1900s
- See also: Other events of 1886; History of Romania; Timeline of Romanian history; Years in Romania

Events from the year 1886 in Romania.

== Incumbents ==
- King: Carol I.
- Prime Minister: Ion Brătianu

== Events ==
- 3 March – The Treaty of Bucharest is signed in the Romanian capital, bringing to an end the Serbo-Bulgarian War.
- 23 May – Romania introduces a tariff on imported goods to protect local industry, which leads to Austria-Hungary introducing new custom duties on imports and the Romanian-Austro-Hungarian customs war. It lasts until December 1893.
- 13 August – Alexandru Ciurcu demonstrates the first boat powered by a compression-reaction rocket engine. It travelled for 15 minutes.
- 5 December – Romania adopts the Berne Convention.
- 20 December – William, Prince of Hohenzollern renounces his heirship to the throne in favour of his younger brother Ferdinand.

== Births ==
- 14 January – Ștefan Protopopescu, aviation pioneer, the first licensed pilot in Romania (died 1929.
- 18 January – Ștefan Dimitrescu, Post-Impressionist painter (died 1933).
- 20 March – George Topîrceanu, war poet and satirist (died 1937).
- 7 June – Henri Coandă, inventor, pioneer of aerodynamics and discoverer of the Coandă effect (died 1972).
- 2 November – Gheorghe Tătărescu, twice prime minister, between 1934 and 1937 and between 1939 and 1940 (died 1957).
- 7 November – Nicolae Macici, lieutenant general during World War II, who died in Aiud Prison (died 1950).
