= Ildikó Raimondi =

Austrian opera singer (born 1962)

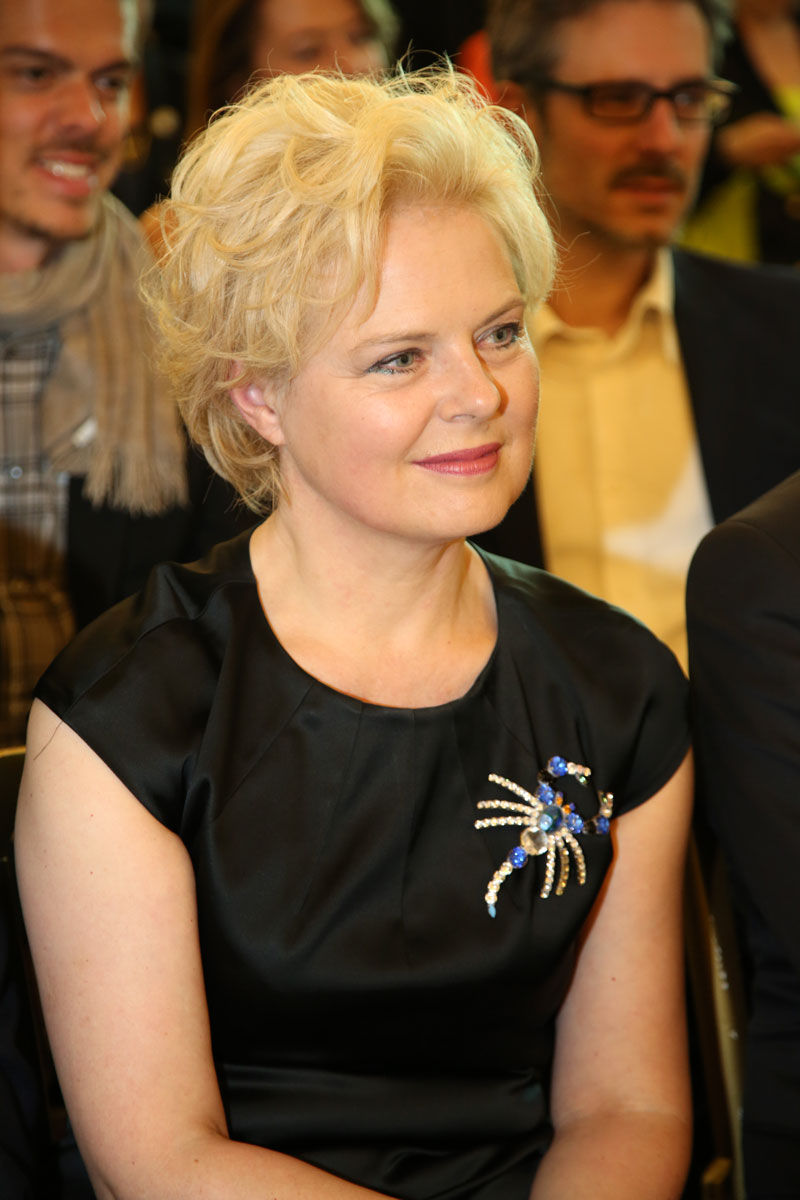
- Raimondi in 2014
- Born: Ildikó Clara Szabo; 11 November 1962 (age 63); Arad, Romania
- Other names: Ildikó Szabo-Raimondi
- Occupations: Operatic soprano; Professor
- Organizations: Vienna State Opera; Mozarteum
- Awards: Kammersängerin; Austrian Decoration for Science and Art

Ildikó Raimondi (born 11 November 1962) is a Hungarian-Austrian operatic soprano and academic voice teacher. She has been a member of the Vienna State Opera since 1991, and has performed leading roles internationally, especially in Mozart operas. She also works in concert and lied, including contemporary compositions. She has received Austrian awards.

== Career ==
Ildikó Clara Szabo was born on 11 November 1962 in Arad, Romania. After studies in her home country and engagements there and in Italy, Raimondi won first prize in the operetta category at the 7th International Hans Gabor Belvedere Singing Competition in 1988.

Since 1991 she has been a member of the ensemble of the Vienna State Opera, where she has appeared in more than 40 roles, including Mozart's Susanna in Le nozze di Figaro, Zerlina in Don Giovanni, and Pamina in Die Zauberflöte. She appeared there as Mimi in Puccini's La bohème and Rosalinde in the operetta Die Fledermaus by Johann Strauss. She appeared as Micaela in Bizet's Carmen also at the Bregenz Festival, as Marzelline in Beethoven's Fidelio at the 1996 Edinburgh Festival Fringe, conducted by Charles Mackerras, and at the Salzburg Festival, performing works by Mozart and Egon Wellesz. Raimondi appeared as a guest at the Deutsche Oper Berlin, the Semperoper in Dresden, the Bavarian State Opera in Munich, the Zürich Opera House, and the Bolshoi Theatre In Moscow. She sang the part of Marzelline in Fidelio, conducted by Zubin Mehta, in the opening season of the Palau de les Arts Reina Sofía, the new opera house of Valencia.

Raimondi has performed in concerts, on radio and television in many European countries, in Japan, Indonesia, the U.S. and Israel. She has sung sacred music, for example in the Schubertiade of the Vienna Musikverein, and in Bach's and Haydn's oratorios. She performed Mozart works at the Wiener Klangbogen and at the Wiener Festwochen. She has interpreted music of the 20th century, including works by Franz Schmidt, Arnold Schoenberg, Alexander von Zemlinsky, Egon Wellesz, Ernst Krenek, Gottfried von Einem, Paul Hindemith, Friedrich Cerha and Thomas Daniel Schlee. In 2003, Raimondi issued a collection of 41 songs by the Czech composer Václav Tomášek on texts by Johann Wolfgang von Goethe. In 2011 she recorded the new gender-neutral text versions of the National anthem of Austria.

Raimondi has been professor of voice at the Mozarteum University Salzburg in Salzburg since October 2015.

== Awards ==
- 2004: Österreichische Kammersängerin
- 2014: Austrian Decoration for Science and Art

== Repertoire ==
=== Opera ===
- Susanna – The Marriage of Figaro
- Zerlina – Don Giovanni
- Pamina, First Lady – The Magic Flute
- Marzelline – Fidelio
- Freia – Das Rheingold
- Gutrune – Götterdämmerung
- Ighino – Palestrina
- Zdenka – Arabella
- Sophie – Weiße Rose
- Adina – L'elisir d'amore
- Alice – Falstaff
- Lauretta – Gianni Schicchi
- Mimi, Musette – La bohème
- Nedda – Pagliacci
- Antonia – The Tales of Hoffmann
- Micaela – Carmen

=== Operetta ===
- Adele, Rosalinde – Die Fledermaus
- Gräfin Gabriele – Wiener Blut
- Hanna Glawari – Die lustige Witwe
- Angele Didier – Der Graf von Luxemburg
- Fedora – Die Zirkusprinzessin

=== Concert ===
- Bach – Passions, masses, cantatas
- Mozart – Masses, Requiem, concert arias
- Haydn – Masses, Die Schöpfung, Die Jahreszeiten
- Bruckner –

=== Lieder ===
- Mozart, Haydn, Beethoven, Schubert, Schumann, Brahms, Wolf (also orchestral songs), Strauss (also orchestral songs), Pfitzner, Schönberg, Zemlinsky (also orchestral songs), Berg, Songs by various masters from the 17th century to the present etc.

== Recordings ==
- Liszt Oubliée – organum classics 2015
- Johan Wenzel Tomaschek – Goethe Lieder / Paladino 2011
- Wiener Opernfest 2005 / Orfeo
- Gruß an Wien 2005 / Arts
- Lieder des Lebens 2002 / ORF
- Ein deutsches Requiem 2002 / ORF
- Don Giovanni 2002 / Naxos Records
- Fidelio 1998 / Telarc
