= Paul Alexiu =

Romanian general

- Born: 8 April 1893; Bucharest, Kingdom of Romania
- Died: 30 September 1963 (aged 70); Bucharest, Romanian People's Republic
- Education: Artillery Military School; Higher War School
- Military career
- Allegiance: Kingdom of Romania; Romanian People's Republic
- Branch: Army
- Service years: 1911–1950
- Rank: Lieutenant general
- Conflicts: World War II
- Awards: Order of the Star of Romania; Order of the German Eagle

Paul Alexiu (April 8, 1893 in Bucharest – September 30, 1963, in Bucharest) was a major-general in the Romanian Armed Forces during World War II.

After attending the Artillery Military School in Bucharest (1911–1913), he graduated with the rank of second lieutenant. After World War I, he pursued his studies at the Higher War School (1920–1922). Alexiu was promoted to lieutenant colonel in 1933 and to colonel in 1938.

The start of Operation Barbarossa on 22 June 1941 found Colonel Alexiu in command of the 3rd Artillery Regiment from the 10th Artillery Brigade, in charge of two 75mm Gun Battalions and one 100mm Howitzer Battalion. During World War II he fought on the Eastern Front, participating in the Crimean campaign, especially in the July 1942 battle at Eltigen in the Kerch Peninsula. He served as commanding officer of the 4th Artillery Regiment between 1941 and 1942, and in 1942 to 1943 he served as the commanding officer of the artillery 10th division. He was promoted to brigadier general in March 1943, and was put in reserve in June 1943.

After King Michael's Coup of August 1944, Alexiu was recalled to active duty in December 1944, and assigned to the command of an artillery brigade attached to the 1st Army. In mid-April 1945 he took command of the 18th division, and fought at the Váh River near Trenčín in western Slovakia, during the Bratislava–Brno Offensive.

In August 1946 he was promoted to major general. From 1946 to 1947, Alexiu was the inspector of artillery. He became commanding 2nd Military Region in 1947 and general officer commanding anti-aircraft defence in 1949. In a secret report from June 1949, the CIA mentioned that Alexiu had been promoted to lieutenant general, and was a "devoted Communist". After retiring from the Army in March 1950, he was arrested in January 1954 and set free in September 1955; while in detention, he was investigated for actions taken during the Odessa massacre of October 1941.

== Awards and honors ==
- Officer of the Order of the Star of Romania (8 June 1940).
- Order of the German Eagle (1943).
