= Florica Prevenda =

Romanian artist (born 1959)

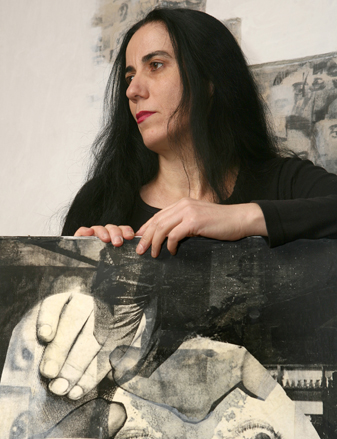
- Florica Prevenda
- Born: 5 April 1959; Dor Mărunt, Romania
- Education: National University of Arts, Iași
- Known for: Painting

Florica Prevenda (born April 5, 1959) is a Romanian artist, who lives and works in Bucharest, Romania.

== Early life and education ==
Prevenda was born on 5 April 1959 into an Aromanian family. She is a graduate of the National University of Arts, Iași (1984). Between (1993–1997) she was an associate professor at the Bucharest National University of Arts.

== Artistic style ==
The artist is known for her studio-based practice, working primarily in mixed media. Her work engages with conceptual themes, often examining and critiquing visual culture. She has exhibited a series of experimental mixed-media projects..

From the fundamental theme of the Face (The National Art Museum, 1999) until the anonymous multitude of the silhouettes of the Metropolis (The Shadows of the Present, Simeza, 2004), the painter meditates (approaching the face schematically and in series) on the entire magma of emotions and anxieties that haunt the human condition nowadays, evolving towards the depersonalisation of all the nets and towards the consumist reification. This existentialist pithy message is embodied in Florica's painting exactly in the rind, the leather, the scales, the scars, the imprints and the crust of the tones of white, grey, black and ochre of the wrapping cardboard. Her images do not become simpler from a cycle to another. They become poli-matters reliefs, with cassetons, with the zigzag rhythms of the goffered cardboard, with fields of numbers with schematized eyes and palms, with interweavings and garlands of paper bands or painted cloth. Therefore, the artist neither performs in narrative scripts, nor composes after effects of rhetoric of the proper abstract image.

Prevenda lays down visual-tactile matter over urban signs of human presence. The processes of growing of the images and of the matters they wear, the densification of the surfaces build for the artist a niche of introspection. It is a painting of emotional combustion, serious in inventiveness, without falling into the ludic. The technique of the artist produces an extremely rich pictural texture without intentionally recovering the ridiculous. Prevenda manufactures bricolating matters and materials without exalting the poverist non-finite. As the musical form close to her painting seems to be an ample organ tocatta.

Prevenda's picto-objectural suites assert, invoking paradoxically exactly the shadow of the human, the withdrawal of the artist from the mundane and the passionate abnegation in the material elaboration of the pictorial body and of its stratified density.

With an iconography evolving around the human face and shape, varying between anonymous and autobiographical representations, the artist reiterates some of contemporary art's main issues: the complex relations between 2D and 3D representation, the physical, hand-operated character of her artistic act versus the almost "industrial" use of technology in other delegated artistic processes, etc. Overall, her work emerges in conceptual series that symbolically address the multi-layered connections between the self/individual and the others/society, between real and virtual identity, in the accelerated, chaotic context of technologically–mediated, globalizing and "democratic" communication.

The numerical codes, the pixelization, the screens, the theme of the shadow suggested the sketched body more and more fragile and fascinated with the virtual world. On the other hand, the theme of the hybridization of the biologicaland the technological allowed the artist to “create a body” for the work of art, continuing a process that she had started in 1990 when she had switched from oil and acrylics to other materials (nails, wire, cardboard, textile, plastic, sawdust etc.) in order to produce collage, assemblage and, in the end, sculpture. The series Time Regained (2005-2008) was announced as an assumed exploration of the self. The human body remained a framework of the artistic works but this time Florica Prevenda staged her own body—deconstructed, broken up, understood as a phantomatic construct connected not only to experiences but also to dreams, expectations, frustrations, wishes. The series Serenity (2009-2010) is the only one in which the artist does not destroy the body but presents it as a total through the outline of the body of a generic child, a beautiful form that is nevertheless empty like a blank page on which life experiences are going to be registered. Facebook Obsession (2011-2015), Ephemeral/Condensation(2015-2016) and Anonymous (2017-2018) are series that problematize the success of the networks of socialization as well as the need for communication and self-representation of contemporary human beings. The impoverishment of identity caused by the new technologies is suggested by sketchy physiognomies to which colour sometimes adds a touch of coquetry and frivolity. In a world in which communication is instantaneous and takes place in a network, the people imprisoned in the image seem to be terminals connected to a central computer which simply cannot establish a real communication.

== Exhibitions ==
Her works have been presented at different locations in Romania and abroad: Hangar Art Center, Brussels (2019), Romanian Cultural Institute, Vienna (2016), Annart Gallery, Bucharest (2016), Arielle d'Hauterives Gallery, Brussels (2016), National Museum of Art, Chisinau (2016), Timișoara Art Museum (2014), Brukenthal National Museum (2017, 2013), AnnArt Gallery (2014), Arthus Gallery, Brussels (1999, 2001, 2004, 2011); National Museum of Art / Contemporary Art, Bucharest (1999); Galerie Het Dijkstoelhuis, Wageningen, Holland (2002, 2004); Mogosoaia Museum, Romania (2017–18, 2008); Galerie Lamber, Valkenswaard, Holland (2000); FNV Kiem, Amsterdam (2002); M.I.A. "One Woman Show", Milano, Italy (2007); Galeria Simeza, Bucharest (2004).
