= Oana Lungescu =

Romanian journalist

Oana Lungescu (born 29 June 1958) is a Romanian journalist with philological education (English and Spanish). Between 2010 and September 2023 she has been the principal NATO spokesperson. In 2024 she joined the Royal United Services Institute (RUSI), a UK defence and security think tank.

== Biography ==
Born in Bucharest, she graduated in 1981 from the Faculty of Philology of the University of Bucharest, the English-Spanish section. Between 1981 and 1983 she worked as an English teacher in the town of Bușteni. In 1983 she refused to cooperate with the Communist secret police, the Securitate. The Securitate prepared an informational tracking file of Lungescu giving her the code name Lorena.

Her mother, originally from Cluj, had settled in 1981 as a physician in West Germany. Oana Lungescu requested in 1983 the granting of a passport for visiting her mother, only to be refused by the authorities. The Securitate tried to force her collaboration through blackmail with a passport and medication for her father, a lawyer, who was seriously ill. After her father died in 1985, she was allowed to live in West Germany, where she obtained German citizenship.

Between 1985 (before the 1989 fall of Communism in Eastern Europe) and 1992, she worked as a reporter for the Romanian section of the BBC, by 1996 becoming editor and auxiliary of BBC's Romanian section, under the editorial name of "Ana Maria Bota". In 1997, she moved to the BBC World Service, where she worked as a correspondent in Brussels and Berlin until 2010, when NATO Secretary General Anders Fogh Rasmussen named her as the new spokesperson, succeeding James Appathurai. She was the first woman, first journalist, first person born in the former Soviet bloc, and became the longest-serving person in this position. As of 2024, Lungescu is distinguished fellow at a UK defence and security think tank, RUSI - the Royal United Services Institute.
