= Mariana Marin =

Romanian writer

Mariana Marin (February 10, 1956 – March 31, 2003) was a Romanian poet.

One of the most gifted and uncompromising poets of the 1980s generation, Adam J. Sorkin described her as "a distinctive voice revealed from the dark night of humanity's soul."

== Life and poetry ==
She was brought up by her mother and her grandmother after her parents' separation, when she was three.

Educated in Bucharest during the time of the Romanian relative cultural freedom of the 1960s, she went on to receive a degree in philology from the University of Bucharest in 1980, starting a grade school teacher career that lasted almost ten years, first in a village along the Danube, then in Bucharest. Her first poetry book, Un război de o sută de ani (A Hundred Year War) was published next year and won the Romanian Writers' Union Prize for a debut in poetry. In 1982 Marin appeared alongside four other '80s writers in a collective volume, Cinci (Five), under the patronage of Nicolae Manolescu, whose so-called "Monday Poetry Circle" all of them used to attend.

More and more overtly opposed to the Nicolae Ceauşescu's dictatorship, her next volume, Aripa secretă (The Secret Annex) employed a not uncommon strategy to circumvent censorship by creating a fantastic diary of, and dialogue with Anne Frank, a thinly disguised metaphor for life in the open-air camp that Romania had become into during the last years of communist rule. She was banned to publish and joined the ranks of silenced intellectual voices until the collapse of the regime in 1989.

For several years following 1990, Marin split her time between Paris and Bucharest. She worked at "Contrapunct", an independent spirited Romanian literary-cultural magazine, involving herself in various journalistic projects. During the decade she travelled a lot, invited to various European literary festivals. Her next book, Mutilarea artistului la tinereţe (The Mutilation of the Artist in his Youth) was unanimously acclaimed and won a number of major literary prizes. In the fall of 2000 she spent six months in Berlin on a writing fellowship and a year later she won the "Virgil Mazilescu" special literary prize.

Navigating between enthusiasm and disappointment during those troubled years following the fall of the communism, barely making ends meet, she survived with the help of friends and aid from the Writers' Union, before descending into chronic alcoholism and developing TB. Despite her misery and ills, she kept writing.

In 2002 she published a career retrospective, Zestrea de aur (The Dowry of Gold), her final book.

She was married and divorced twice, she had no children.

== Translated ==
- Au carrefour des grandes routes commerciales, (translated by Sébastien Reichmann), Ed. Samuel Tastet, 1990.
- Comme dans un dessin d'Escher, (with Mircea Cartarescu, Daniel Banulescu, Ileana Mălăncioiu), Ed. PHI, 2002.
- Paper Children, (translated by Adam J. Sorkin), Zephyr Press, 2006.
- Something is still present and isn't, of what's gone. A bilingual anthology of avant-garde and avant-garde inspired Rumanian poetry, (translated by Victor Pambuccian), Aracne editrice, Rome, 2018.

== Awards ==
- Romanian Writers' Union Prize (1981, 1999)
- ASPRO (Association of Professional Romanian Writers), 1999
- Virgil Mazilescu Prize (2001)

== Quotes ==
I hurry toward death
without a purpose,
without a wedding gown,
without a dowry of gold.
Without myself.
Serene
and bitter,
I hurry across my native land
As if tomorrow had already been.

Elegy (The Dowry of Gold) translated by Adam J. Sorkin
