= Ion Codreanu (general) =

Romanian general

Ion Codreanu (23 June 1891–8 January 1960) was a Romanian major general during World War II.

== Biography ==
Born in Bălăbănești, he started his education at the elementary school in his native village, and then at the Gheorghe Roșca Codreanu High School in Bârlad, graduating in 1910. Codreanu attended the Military School in Târgoviște from 1910 to 1912, graduating with the rank of second lieutenant, and then fought in the Second Balkan War and in World War I.

He advanced in rank to lieutenant colonel in 1933, and to colonel in 1938. In 1940 he was awarded the Order of the Star of Romania, officer rank. In 1941, he was first the director of the Higher Cavalry Department, then Commanding Officer of the 6th Cavalry Division. He became Head of the Historical Service of the General Staff and following that, the Head of the Royal Military Household in 1942. In March 1943, he was promoted to brigadier general, after which he served as Vice-Chief of the General Staff and then Commander of the Higher War School. Codreanu was Chief of Operations of the General Staff in 1944 and Inspector of Cavalry in 1945. In September 1946 he was promoted to major general, and was appointed General Officer Commanding of the 2nd Corps Area. He went into reserve and retired in 1947.
