= De-satellization of the Socialist Republic of Romania =

Release of Romania from its Soviet satellite status

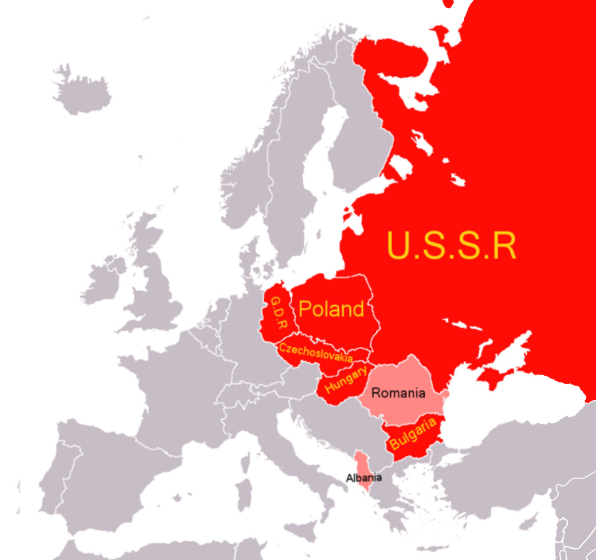
The Warsaw Pact during the early 1960s. Romania and Albania are coloured in light red, while the rest of the Warsaw Pact members are red.

The de-satellization of the Socialist Republic of Romania from the Soviet Union is the termfor the notional release of Romania from its Soviet satellite state status in the 1960s. The Romanian leadership achieved the de-satellization partly by taking advantage of Nikita Khrushchev's errors and vulnerabilities. Romania's independence was tolerated by Moscow because its ruling party was not going to abandon communism. Although Romania remained a member of both the Warsaw Pact and Comecon, it was not to be a docile member of either.

To some degree, towards the end of the rule of Gheorgiu-Dej and after the death of Stalin, the Romanian leadership successfully achieved a greater relative independence compared to the rest of the Eastern Bloc; in some aspects, arguably more then Cuba. The Romanian regime would become largely impervious to Soviet political influence, and Ceaușescu was the only declared opponent of glasnost and perestroika. Due to the conflictual relationship between Bucharest and Moscow, the West did not hold the Soviet Union responsible for the policies pursued by Romania, as it did for other countries in the region such as Czechoslovakia and Poland. At the start of 1990, Soviet foreign minister Eduard Shevardnadze implicitly confirmed the lack of Soviet influence over Ceaușescu's Romania. When asked whether it made sense for him to visit Romania less than two weeks after its revolution, Shevardnadze insisted that only by going in person to Romania could he figure out how to "restore Soviet influence".

Romania's independence left little room for the independence of others, and as such had to be isolated. In the late 1960s, Władysław Gomułka of Poland and Todor Zhivkov of Bulgaria even suggested expelling Romania from the Warsaw Pact over Romanian-proposed amendments to the Treaty on the Non-Proliferation of Nuclear Weapons. The ensuing declaration of support for the Soviet draft of the non-proliferation treaty - signed without Romania - made public for the first time the disagreements between Romania and the rest of the Warsaw Pact members. The Prague Spring enabled Romania to turn its isolation back into independence. Ceaușescu's Romania had at least as much leverage within the Warsaw Pact as Charles de Gaulle's France had within NATO. However, instead of withdrawing Romania from the Warsaw Pact as de Gaulle did with the integrated structures of NATO, the Romanian leadership began to see the benefits of the Pact as an instrument for asserting its independence.

By the time Soviet Marshal Andrei Grechko assumed command of the Warsaw Pact in 1960, both Romania and Albania had for all practical purposes defected from the Pact. In the early 1960s, Grechko initiated programs meant to preempt Romanian doctrinal heresies, which threatened the Pact's unity and cohesion, from spreading to other Pact members. No other country succeeded in escaping from the Warsaw Pact in the way Romania and Albania did. Yet while Albania formally withdrew from the Pact in 1968, Romania did not. Its reasons for remaining included Ceaușescu's interest in preserving the threat of a Pact invasion so he could sell himself as a nationalist, as well as privileged access to NATO counterparts and a seat at various European forums which he otherwise could not have obtained. For instance, Romania and the Soviet-led remainder of the Warsaw Pact formed two distinct groups in the elaboration of the Helsinki Final Act.

Certain historians such as Robert King and Dennis Deletant argue against using the term "independent" to describe Romania's relations with the Soviet Union, favoring "autonomy" due to its continued membership in both the Comecon and Warsaw Pact, along with its commitment to socialism. But this perspective fails to explain why Romania blocked Mongolia's accession to the Warsaw Pact in July 1963, why it voted in favor of a November 1963 UN resolution to establish a nuclear-free zone in Latin America when the other socialist countries abstained, or why it opposed the Soviet-proposed "strong collective riposte" against China in 1964, to take but a few examples from the 1963–1964 period.

== History ==
=== De-satellization (1956–1965) ===
After the establishment of a Romanian Communist Party-dominated government in 1945, the country soon became an unquestioning Soviet satellite. Decisions regarding foreign and economic policy were taken in Moscow and loyally executed by local communists. The period of unchallenged Soviet domination lasted until 1955.

A long-standing ambition of communist leader Gheorghe Gheorghiu-Dej had been the withdrawal of all Soviet troops from Romanian territory. This was finally achieved on 25 July 1958, when Romania announced that all Soviet troops had left its territory, arguably the biggest development in the country between 1956 and Dej's death in 1965. Under the 1947 peace treaty, Soviet forces garrisoned in Romania were meant to help defend the supply lines to Soviet bases in Austria. After the Austrian State Treaty in 1955 and the withdrawal of the Red Army there, that pretext was moot, and the Romanians suggested the Soviets reconsider the need to maintain a military presence in Romania. Nikita Khrushchev's reaction was hostile, and following the Hungarian Revolution of 1956, it was "agreed" that the Red Army would have to remain in Romania.

But at a Warsaw Pact meeting in May 1958, in keeping with Khrushchev's desire for improved relations with the West, the withdrawal of the Red Army from Romania was announced. The decision was also likely taken to lessen Romanian anger at the treatment of Hungarian revolution leader Imre Nagy, who was taken to Romania after his arrest and flown back to a secret trial in Hungary on a Romanian plane.

The Soviet military withdrawal began in early July and was completed by the end of the month. This was the first major step towards de-Sovietization and de-satellization in Romania, and there appeared to be no turning back. The Soviet withdrawal of 1958, together with the Sino-Soviet split, gave Romania the opportunity to realign its position within the Comecon. SovRom corporations – through which the Soviets had exercised almost exclusive control over Romania's economy – had already been dissolved in 1954. In 1963, many streets and public places were restored to their original names or – in cases where the originals were politically unacceptable – given Romanian names instead of Russian ones. The Russian Institute in Bucharest was closed and within a few years, Russian was no longer the second language taught in Romanian schools. In December 1964, Soviet advisors – including those in the intelligence and security services – were withdrawn from Romania. Gheorghiu-Dej died in March 1965. His successor, Nicolae Ceaușescu, pursued national self-reliance with "demonic frenzy". Romania's appeal to nationalism was incompatible with satellite status.

In April 1964, Romania formally declared its independence from the Soviet Union's control and detailed its plans to reorient its economy towards agriculture and natural resource extraction. The Romanian campaign for independence culminated on 22 April 1964, when the Romanian Communist Party issued a declaration proclaiming that "every Marxist-Leninist Party has a sovereign right...to elaborate, choose or change the forms and methods of socialist construction" and that "there exists no 'parent' party and 'offspring' party, no 'superior' and 'subordinated' parties, but only the large family of communist and workers' parties having equal rights," adding that "there are not and there can be no unique patterns and recipes". This amounted to a declaration of political and ideological independence from Moscow.

Because the term "People's Republic" usually indicated satellite status in the Soviet orbit, the 1965 Constitution of Romania changed the country's official title to "Socialist Republic". In the 1960s, the reference to the "Soviet liberators" in the national anthem was also dropped.

=== Further developments (1965–1984) ===
The Nicolae Ceaușescu era, which began in 1965, saw political power in Romania become nationalized and personalized. In 1962, Soviet economists proposed to subordinate the economy of Eastern Europe, including that of Romania, to a supranational planning body of the Comecon. Starting in 1964, the Romanian leadership's stance on international issues frequently and markedly differed from that of the Soviet Union. A particular turning point occurred in 1968, when Ceaușescu publicly criticised the Warsaw Pact invasion of Czechoslovakia and refused to participate. Romania formally approached the European Economic Community for preferential trade terms in 1972, and repeatedly took independent positions in the United Nations. In 1973, Romania became the first Warsaw Pact country to conduct most of its trade with non-Communist countries.

In 1967, Comecon adopted the "interested party principle", under which any country could opt out of any project it chose while still allowing the other member states to use Comecon mechanisms to coordinate their activities. In principle, any country could still veto a policy, but the hope was that it would simply step aside or be a reluctant participant. This was aimed, at least in part, at allowing Romania to chart its own economic course without leaving Comecon entirely or bringing the organization to a standstill. Under Ceaușescu, Romania plotted the most independent foreign policy of all Warsaw Pact countries. Romania, already without Soviet troops on its soil, stopped participating in Warsaw Pact troop exercises in 1962. The least active member of the Comecon, Romania was a member of the International Monetary Fund and the World Bank. It owed much of its economic leeway to its oil and grain production, which freed it from Soviet economic leverage.

In 1974, Romania denied a Soviet request to build a railway from Odessa across eastern Romania to Varna. This broad-gauge railroad could have been used to transport major army units to Bulgaria. Romania opposed the use of its territory by foreign forces, and with Bulgaria was one of the two Warsaw Pact members not to allow the stationing of foreign troops on its soil, Soviet or otherwise. Although Romania did participate in joint Warsaw Pact air and naval exercises, it did not allow such exercises on its own territory. In addition to not allowing Warsaw Pact maneuvers or Soviet bases in Romania, Ceaușescu ended Soviet indoctrination and training in the Romanian Army, and prevented Soviet officers from interfering in decisions of Romanian personnel.

While remaining in the Warsaw Pact, Romania continued diverging from many Soviet international policies. It condemned the Soviet invasion of Afghanistan and was the only Warsaw Pact country to participate in the 1984 Summer Olympics in Los Angeles, boycotted by the rest of the Warsaw Pact in response to the U.S.-led boycott of the Moscow 1980 Summer Olympics. Romania was "aligned but independent". Soviet trade subsidies during 1960–1978 for the other five Warsaw Pact states ranged from $4.6 billion (Bulgaria) to $23.7 billion (East Germany). For Romania, Soviet trade subsidies during this period were negative, with a total of $0.5 billion paid in net implicit trade taxes.

== Romania's foreign policy during de-satellization ==
While Romania and the USSR signed the Soviet-Romanian Treaty of Friendship, Co-operation and Mutual Assistance in 1970, Romania continued to pursue its independent policies. Romania remained neutral during the Sino-Soviet dispute and maintained friendly relations with China, recognized West Germany in January 1967, and did not break diplomatic relations with Israel after the Six-Day War. Romania also acted as one of the mediators in Egyptian-Israeli talks that led to the Camp David Accords, which the USSR opposed. When other Eastern Bloc countries severed diplomatic relations with Chile after the anti-communist coup there in September 1973, Romania refused to do so.

In 1979, following the Soviet-backed Vietnamese invasion of Democratic Kampuchea, Romania became the first Warsaw Pact member to cast an anti-Soviet vote in the United Nations General Assembly. It also continued to recognize the Khmer Rouge as the legitimate representative of Cambodia in the UN (Romania was one of ten countries that had maintained an embassy in Cambodia during Pol Pot's reign). When the Soviet Union invaded Afghanistan in 1979, Romania abstained on a UN General Assembly resolution calling for the immediate and unconditional withdrawal of Soviet troops. One month later, at a meeting of communist states in Sofia, Romania joined North Korea in refusing to endorse the invasion.

== See also ==
- Romania–Soviet Union relations
- Tito–Stalin split, or Soviet–Yugoslav split
- Albanian–Soviet split
- Sino-Albanian split
- Sino-Soviet split
