= Timeline of Romanian history =

This is a timeline of Romanian history, comprising important legal and territorial changes and political events in Romania and its predecessor states. To read about the background to these events, see History of Romania.

== 1st millennium BC ==
=== 5th century BC ===
Year	Date	Event
440 BC		Herodotus in Histories is the first to mention Dacians as living on the territory of modern-day Romania.
5th century		Charnabon, king of the Getae.

=== 4th century BC ===
Year	Date	Event
4th century		Cothelas, King of the Getae.
339 BC		Rex Histrianorum, ruling over Histria, is mentioned by Trogus Pompeius și Justinus.
4th century		The Getae silver Helmet of Agighiol.
4th century		The Geto-Dacian Helmet of Coțofenești.
4th century		The Geto-Dacian Helmet of Iron Gates.
4th century		The Geto-Dacian Helmet of Făcău-Bulbucata.
4th century		The Geto-Dacian Helmet of Peretu.

=== 3rd century BC ===
Year	Date	Event
c. 300 BC		King Dromichaetes ruled both sides of the river Danube.
		King Moskon ruled the northern parts of Dobruja.

=== 2nd century BC ===
Year	Date	Event
c. 200 BC		King Rhemaxos protected Greek colonies in Dobruja.

=== 1st century BC ===
Year	Date	Event
100 BC		King Dicomes ruled Dacia.
100 BC		King Rholes ruled Dobruja.
100 BC		King Dapyx ruled Dobruja.
82 BC		King Burebista rules Dacia. (to 44 BC)
44 BC		Deceneus is High Priest of Dacia. (to 27 BC)
40 BC		King Cotiso ruled Banat and Oltenia. (to 9 BC)
29 BC		King Zyraxes ruled northern Dobruja. (to 27 BC)
9 BC		King Comosicus ruled Dacia. (to AD 30)

== 1st millennium ==
=== 1st century ===
Year	Date	Event
30		King Scorilo ruled Dacia. (to 70)
68		King Duras ruled Dacia. (to 87)
86		Roman Emperor Domitian loses war with the Kingdom of Dacia. (to 88)
87		King Decebalus ruled Dacia. (to 106)

=== 2nd century ===
Year	Date	Event
101		First war between the Roman Empire and Dacia which ended in an unfavorable peace treaty for emperor Trajan. (to 102)
105		Peace broken, King Decebalus loses Second Dacian War, the south-west part of Dacia becomes a Roman province. (to 106)
170		The Costoboci tribe invades Roman territory. Meeting little opposition, they swept through and raided the provinces of Moesia Inferior, Moesia Superior, Thracia, Macedonia and Achaea. (to 171)
177		Written on bronze tablets, the Roman laws of Troesmis attest the joint rule of Roman emperors Marcus Aurelius and Commodus. (to 180)
200		Pieporus is king over the Dacian Costoboci (see Costoboci#Onomastics).
200		Tribal king Tarbus is mentioned by Dio Cassius without having his origin specified. Some authors consider a possible Dacian ethnicity

=== 3rd century ===
Year	Date	Event
260		After the defeat and capture of Roman emperor Valerian, Dacian general Regalianus became Roman emperor for a brief period.
271		Roman withdrawal from Dacia occurs under Roman emperor Aurelianus after 169 years of rule. (to 275)

=== 4th century ===
Year	Date	Event
305	May	Galerius, born in Serdica (Sofia, Bulgaria), whose mother had fled from Dacia Traiana, becomes and rules as Roman Emperor. He is also awarded six Carpicus Maximus titles after winning six battles against the Carps. Galerius died in late April or early May 311 from a horribly gruesome disease described by Eusebius and Lactantius, possibly some form of bowel cancer, gangrene or Fournier gangrene. (to 311)
308		Dacian-born Maximinus II (Galerius' nephew) becomes Roman Emperor. He competed with Licinius in the Civil wars of the Tetrarchy. He ruled together with other Roman Emperors as per the Civil wars of the Tetrarchy. (to 313)
308		Licinius I, born to peasant family which had fled from Dacia Traiana, becomes Roman Emperor of the eastern part of the Roman Empire. He was the childhood friend of the Roman Emperor Galerius. (to 324)
311		Galerius signs the Edict of Serdica (modern day Sofia, Bulgaria) thus officially ending the Diocletianic persecution of Christianity in the East two years before the Edict of Milan being the first edict legalizing Christianity.
313		Shortly before Maximinus II's death at Tarsus, while previously persecuting Christians and opposing the Edict of Serdica, he issued an edict of tolerance on his own, granting Christians the rights of assembling, of building churches, and the restoration of their confiscated properties.
313	February	Licinius I co-authored the Edict of Milan with Roman Emperor Constantine I thus bestowing legal status on the Christian religion. Christianity was later made the official religion of the Roman Empire under Roman Emperor Theodosius I in 380.
313		According to Lactantius' literary chronicle De mortibus Persecutorum, Galerius affirms his Dacian (Thracian) identity by avowing himself the enemy of the Roman name once made emperor, even proposing that the empire should be called the "Dacian Empire". He exhibited anti-Roman attitude as soon as he had attained the highest power, treating the Roman citizens with ruthless cruelty, like the conquerors treated the conquered, all in the name of the same treatment that the victorious Trajan had applied to the conquered Dacians, forefathers of Galerius, two centuries before. (to 316)
317		Roman emperor Constantine I the Great is awarded the title Carpicus Maximus after winning a battle against the Carps.
317	March 1	Licinius II (Licinius I's son) serves in the Eastern Roman Empire with the rank of Caesar as per the inscription "LICINIUS IUNior NOBilissimus CAESar" which translates as 'Licinius Junior Most Noble Caesar'. (to 324)
324		Constantine I defeats Licinius I at the Battle of Chrysopolis and becomes Roman Emperor during the Civil wars of the Tetrarchy.
325		Licinius I is hanged by Constantine due to being accused of conspiring to raise troops among the barbarians.
326		Licinius II is killed by the Roman Emperor Constantine, probably in the context of the execution of Caesar Crispus.
333		The Itinerarium Burdigalense mentions Troesmis. (to 334)
353		The Roman soldier and historian Ammianus Marcellinus places the Carps as living inside the Roman Empire. (to 378)
370		Alaric I is born on Peuce Island, Dobruja, modern-day Romania. He later led the Goths in the Sack of Rome (410).
381		The Byzantine chronicler Zosimus records an invasion over the Danube by a barbarian coalition of Huns, Sciri and what he terms Karpodakai, or Carpo-Dacians, as being defeated by emperor Theodosius.
390		The Notitia Dignitatum mentions the presence of the commander of the Roman Legion Legio II Herculia in Troesmis.
393		A coin bearing the name of the Western Roman Emperor Honorius was found in a grave at Troesmis. (to 395)
400		Tabula Peutingeriana shows about 88 localities, the names of some of which were still Dacian at the time of its compiling as they end in -dava. 20 of them are still inhabited today, and 6 of them still retain the same name, or, incorporate their original names into their current name.
400		A paleo-Christian basilica was discovered in Niculițel in the spot named "La Plăcintă". Coins from between 330 and 354 were discovered, as were 5th-century modifications to the basilica. While a specific end date for the use of the basilica could not be determined, a couple of 10th century submerged dwellings were discovered as having been dug in the NV corner of the nave which concludes that the basilica was in disarray by the 10th century. Under the altar there is a crypt which housed the bones of the martyrs whose names were written on the sidewalls. (to 600)
400		A paleo-Christian basilica was discovered in the Adamclisi fortress. (to 600)
4th century		The Biertan Donarium was made.

=== 5th century ===
Year	Date	Event
500		A 5th century burial contained a Roman type brooch.
500		At Napoca, cross-dating using pottery remains infers a post-Roman date for the construction of a Roman styled porticus.
500		At Porolissum, red-slipped ware (terra sigillata Porolissensis) has been found in a post-Roman (re)construction phase of the forum.
500		At Potaissa, burials containing iron buckles, flint-steel, gold and silver jewelry, amber and embroidery beads have been excavated.
500		A 5th–6th century small basilica was discovered in the west sector of the Tomis citadel in modern-day Constanța. (to 600)
500		A 5th–6th century bigger basilica was discovered in the west sector of the Tomis citadel in modern-day Constanța. (to 600)
500		Another 5th–6th century Christian basilica was discovered in the Tomis citadel, modern-day Constanța. (to 600)
500		A crypt is all that is left of a paleo-Christian basilica discovered at Tomis. Three enclosures for the remains of saints were discovered. (to 600)
500		A 5th–6th century Christian basilica was discovered in 2012 at Noviodunum. According to the archeologist Florin Topoleanu, the population of 5th century Noviodunum was Christian. (to 600)
500		Blachernae was a suburb of Constantinople. The Romanian philologist Ilie Gherghel, wrote a study about Blachernae and concluded that it possibly derived from the name of a Vlach (sometimes written as Blach or Blasi), who came to Constantinople from the lower Danube, a region named today Dobruja. Gherghel compared data from old historians like Genesios and from the Greek lexicon Suidas and mentioned the existence of a small colony of Vlachs in the area of today Blachernae. Similar opinions were sustained by Lisseanu.

=== 6th century ===
Year	Date	Event
513		Blachernae appeared in a work by Theophanes Confessor in connection with a revolt of Flavius Vitalianus against Anastasius I Dicorus, Emperor in 513.
571		A bronze coin from the time of the Eastern Roman Emperor Justin II was discovered at Troesmis. (to 573)
587		First written record about a Romance language spoken in Southeastern Europe: a Byzantine soldier, native to Thrace (in present-day Bulgaria, Greece or Turkey), shouted at his companion "torna, torna fratre" ("turn around, turn around, brother") during a Byzantine campaign against the Avars invading the Balkan Peninsula.
588		Troesmis was inhabited until 593. Byzantine coins were discovered here and dated between 588 and 593 during the reign of Byzantine emperor Maurice. (to 593)
600		Procopius mentions forts with names such as Skeptekasas, Burgulatu, Loupofantana and Gemellomountes. Modern authors claim these as Romanian names: Seven House, Broad City, Wolf's Well and Twin Mountains.

=== 7th century ===
Year	Date	Event
610		Roman Emperor Heraclius grants lands to the sclavenes located in Macedonia eventually the sclavenes later form Sclavinias a term described by Byzantine historians referring to tribal groups.
681		Formation of the First Bulgarian Empire (681–1018), including the lands east and south of the Carpathians
700		The Ravenna Cosmography mentions Troesmis.
700		Ananias of Shirak, a 7th-century Armenian geographer described the "large country of Dacia" as inhabited by Slavs who formed "twenty-five tribes".
700		Some authors state that Troesmis was inhabited until the end of the 7th century based on archeological evidence.

=== 8th century ===
Year	Date	Event
800		Cremation cemeteries of the "Nușfalău-Someșeni group" were discovered in northwestern Transylvania, with their 8th- and 9th-century tumuli.
800		Ten 8th century graves of adults with bracelets from Troesmis were discovered in 1977.

=== 9th century ===
Year	Date	Event
c. 805		The Bulgarian khan Krum defeated the Avar Khaganate to destroy the remainder of the Avars, conquered eastern part of the Carpathian Basin including Transylvania, spreading from the middle Danube to the Dnieper. The Ongal was the traditional Bulgar name for the area north of the Danube across the Carpathians covering Transylvania and along the Danube into eastern part of the Carpathian Basin. This resulted in the establishment of a common border between the Frankish Empire and Bulgaria.
824		The Fourth Section of the Royal Frankish Annals mentions the Abodrites who lived in "Dacia on the Danube as neighbors of the Bulgars" sent envoys to Emperor Louis the Pious in 824, complaining "about vicious aggression by the Bulgars" and seeking the emperor's assistance against them, according to the Royal Frankish Annals. The Abodrites inhabited the lands along either the Timiș or the Tisza rivers.
890		Menumorut, Glad, and the Vlach Gelou are the rulers of Crișana, Banat, and Transylvania when the Magyars invaded the territoriy, according to the Gesta Hungarorum.
900		Fine, gray vessels were also unearthed in the 9th-century "Blandiana A" cemeteries in the area of Alba-Iulia, which constitutes a "cultural enclave" in Transylvania. Near these cemeteries, necropolises of graves with west–east orientation form the distinct "Ciumbrud group". Female dress accessories from "Ciumbrud graves" are strikingly similar to those from Christian cemeteries in Bulgaria and Moravia.

=== 10th century ===
Year	Date	Event
906		Menumorut dies and is succeeded by his son-in-law, Zoltán of Hungary, according to the Gesta Hungarorum.
943		An Old Slavonic (Old Bulgarian) inscription found among the remains of Trajan's Wall in Dobruja bears the name of župan Demetrius.
969		The "Western part" of Troesmis is supposed to have been rebuilt and used again during the reign of the Eastern Roman Emperor John I Tzimiskes based on archaeological discoveries.
976		The Greek historian John Skylitzes mentions the word βλάχοι (Vlachs) in his work Synopsis of Histories.
983		Ibn al-Nadīm published in 938 the work Kitāb al-Fihrist mentioning "Turks, Bulgars and Vlahs" (using Blagha for Vlachs)
1000		According to the Arab chronicler Mutahhar al-Maqdisi, "They say that in the Turkic neighbourhood there are the Khazars, Russians, Slavs, Waladj, Alans, Greeks and many other peoples."
1000		Another župan by the name of George is possibly mentioned in an inscription in the Murfatlar Cave Complex, in Dobruja. The Complex is a relict from a widespread monastic phenomenon in a 10th-century Bulgaria.
1000		The Byzantine Emperor Constantine VII mentions Troesmis.

== 2nd millennium ==
=== 11th century ===
Year	Date	Event
1010		Coins and follis notes from Troesmis have been discovered. (to 1020)
1018		The "Blökumenn" (often identified as Vlachs) are mentioned in a later source as fighting in Kievan Rus'. (to 1019)
1050		The Swedish Runestone G134 mentions the ethnonym Blakumen as it recorded the death of Hróðfúss who was treacherously killed by Vlachs while travelling abroad.
1066		Byzantine writer Kekaumenos, author of the Strategikon, described a 1066 Roman (Vlach) revolt in northern Greece.
1100		An 11th century byzantine settlement was discovered at Argamum.

=== 12th century ===
Year	Date	Event
1113		The Russian Primary Chronicle, written in ca. 1113, recorded that nomad Hungarians drove away the Vlachs and took their lands.
1164		Prince Andronikos Komnenos, son of (list of byzantine emperors) John II Komnenos, was apprehended by Vlachs in his escape taking the road towards Galitza/Galicia.
1166		Byzantine historian John Kinnamos described Leon Vatatzes' military expedition along the northern Danube, where Vatatzes mentioned the participation of Vlachs in battles with the Magyars (Hungarians) in 1166.
1185		Ivan Asen I of Bulgaria and Peter II of Bulgaria, described unanimously by chronicles written in the late 12th and early 13th centuries as Vlachs, rebelled against byzantine authority and restored the Second Bulgarian Empire as co-rulers, founding the Asen dynasty.
1196		Kaloyan of Bulgaria, younger brother of Ivan Asen I of Bulgaria and Peter II of Bulgaria, became Emperor of Bulgaria. (to October 1207)
1197		Dobromir Chrysos was a leader of the Vlachs and Bulgaria in eastern Macedonia during the reign of Byzantine emperor Alexios III Angelos. According to Niketas Choniates, a 12th-century Greek byzantine government official, Dobromir was Vlach by birth.
1200		Benjamin of Tudela of the Kingdom of Navarre was one of the first writers to use the word Vlachs for a Romance-speaking population.

=== 13th century ===
Year	Date	Event
1204	November 8	A papal legate delivered a royal crown to Kaloyan of Bulgaria and crowned him "King of the Bulgarians and Vlachs".
1213		An army of Vlachs, Transylvanian Saxons, and Pechenegs, led by Ioachim of Sibiu, attacked the Bulgaria and Cumans that were from Vidin.
1222		Țara Făgărașului was mentioned in documents as Terra Blacorum.
1224		The Diploma Andreanum was issued by Andrew II of Hungary granting provisional autonomy to colonial Germans residing in the present-day area of Sibiu.
1224		Țara Făgărașului was mentioned in documents as Silva Blacorum.
1241		The Persian chronicle Jāmiʿ al-Tawārīkh mentions several rulers from Wallachia such as Bezerenbam and Mișelav and the country of Ilaut.
1247		The diploma of King Béla IV of Hungary issued on July 2, 1247, mentions the local rulers knyaz John, knyaz Farcaș, voivode Litovoi and voivode Seneslau. Seneslau and Litovoi are expressly said to be Vlachs (Olati) in the king's diploma.
1252		Țara Făgărașului was mentioned in documents as Terra Olacorum.
1277		Bărbat succeeds his brother Litovoi as ruler of Oltenia after the later was killed during a battle with the Hungarian army. (to 1280)
1288		First evidence of Diet in Transylvania.
1290		According to legend and the 17th century Cantacuzino Annals, Radu Negru founded Wallachia.

=== 14th century ===
Year	Date	Event
1310		Basarab I's rule starts and lasts until 1351/1352.
1330		Basarab I of Wallachia wins the Battle of Posada against Charles I Robert of Hungary.
1332		Thocomerius is named in a diploma of Charles I of Hungary as being the father of Basarab I. Certain historians such as Vlad Georgescu and Marcel Popa believe him to have been a voievode in Wallachia having succeeded Bărbat who ruled around 1278.
1340		During the reign of Ivan Alexander of Bulgaria (1331–1371) the control over powerful vassals, such as the rulers of Wallachia and Dobruja, who pursued their own foreign policies, was hardly stronger. The Principality of Karvuna or Despotate of Dobruja (Bulgarian: Добруджанско деспотство or Карвунско деспотство; Romanian: Despotatul Dobrogei or Țara Cărvunei) split off from the Second Bulgarian Empire in the region of modern Dobruja and Northeast Bulgaria
1345		King Louis I of Hungary dispatched Andrew Lackfi, Count of the Székelys to invade the lands of the Golden Horde in retaliation for the Tatars' earlier plundering raids against Transylvania. Lackfi and his army of mainly Székely warriors inflicted a defeat on a large Tatar army on 2 February 1345. The campaign had finally expelled the Tatars and ended the devastations of the Mongols in Transylvania. The Golden Horde was pushed back behind the Dniester River, thereafter the Golden Horde's control of the lands between the Eastern Carpathians and the Black Sea weakened.
1346		Foundation of Moldavia.
1400		Vlach settlements existed throughout much of today's Croatia, but centres of population were focused around the Velebit and Dinara mountains and along the Krka and Cetina rivers.
1400		The Flateyjarbók preserves the 13th century biography of King Olaf II of Norway which amongst other things records the adventures of a Norwegian prince Eymund in the saga Eymundar þáttr hrings, who informs Jarizleifr of the departure of Jarizleifr's brother, Burizlaf, to Tyrkland, and added that Burizlaf was preparing to attack Jarizleifr with a huge army formed by Tyrkir, Blökumen and other peoples.

=== 15th century ===
Year	Date	Event
1437		The Transylvanian peasant revolt broke out at Bobâlna.
1438		The Unio Trium Nationum pact was signed as a reaction to the Transylvanian peasant revolt at Bobâlna.
1442		In this year, John Hunyadi won four victories against the Ottomans, two of which were decisive. In March 1442, Hunyadi defeated Mezid Bey and the raiding Ottoman army at the Battle of Szeben in the south part of the Kingdom of Hungary in Transylvania. In September 1442, Hunyadi defeated a large Ottoman army of Beylerbey Şehabeddin, the Provincial Governor of Rumelia. This was the first time that a European army defeated such a large Ottoman force, composed not only of raiders, but of the provincial cavalry led by their own sanjak beys (governors) and accompanied by the formidable janissaries.
1465	October 14	Radu cel Frumos issues a writ from his residence in Bucharest.
1476		The Polish chronicler Jan Długosz remarked in 1476 that Moldavians and Wallachians "share a language and customs".
1479		The Battle of Breadfield was the most tremendous conflict fought in Transylvania up to that time in the Ottoman–Hungarian Wars, taking place in 1479 during the reign of King Matthias Corvinus. The Hungarian army defeated a highly outnumbered Ottoman army and the Ottoman casualties were extremely high. The battle was the most significant victory for the Hungarians against the Ottomans, and as a result, the Ottomans did not attack southern Hungary and Transylvania for many years thereafter.

=== 16th century ===
Year	Date	Event
1514		The Székely György Dózsa led a peasant's revolt in Transylvania against Hungarian nobles.
1521		Neacșu's letter is one of the oldest surviving documents written in the Romanian language.
1526		After the death of the Hungarian king at the Battle of Mohács in 1526, both the Austrian Habsburg family and the Hungarian noble Zápolya family claimed the whole kingdom. King John I of Hungary ruled the Eastern Hungarian Kingdom, and the Habsburgs ruled the western part of the Hungary.
1532		Francesco della Valle writes that "they name themselves Romei in their own language" ("si dimandano in lingua loro Romei") and, he also cites the expression "Do you know Romanian?" ("se alcuno dimanda se sano parlare in la lingua valacca, dicono a questo in questo modo: Sti Rominest ? Che vol dire: Sai tu Romano?").
1534		Tranquillo Andronico remarks that Vlachs now name themselves Romanians (Valachi nunc se Romanos vocant).
1541		King John I of Hungary died in 1540, the Habsburg forces besieged Buda the Hungarian capital in 1541, Sultan Suleiman led a relief force and defeated the Habsburgs, the Ottomans captured the city by a trick during the Siege of Buda and the south central and central areas of the Kingdom of Hungary came under the authority of the Ottoman Empire, therefore Hungary was divided into three parts.
1542		The Transylvanian Szekler Johann Lebel wrote that "the Vlachs name each other Romuini".
1554		The Polish chronicler Stanislaw Orzechowski mentions that "in their language, the vlachs name themselves romini".
1563		An Acts of the Apostles book is printed by the printer Coresi from Brașov in Romanian, though written with the Cyrillic alphabet at the time.
1568		For the first time in history, the Diet of Torda in Transylvania in 1568 declared freedom of religion. While in other parts of Europe and the world religious wars were fought. The Roman Catholic, Lutheran, Calvinist, and Unitarian Churches and religions were declared to be fully equal, and the Romanian Orthodox religion was tolerated.
1570		The Eastern Hungarian Kingdom was the predecessor state of the Principality of Transylvania. The Principality of Transylvania was established after the signing the Treaty of Speyer in 1570 by king John II and emperor Maximiliam II, thus John Sigismund Zápolya, the Eastern Hungarian king became the first prince of Transylvania. According to the treaty, the Principality of Transylvania nominally remained part of the Kingdom of Hungary in the sense of public law. The Treaty of Speyer stressed in a highly significant way that John Sigismund's possessions belonged to the Holy Crown of Hungary and he was not permitted to alienate them.
1570		The Croatian Ante Verančić specifies that "the vlachs from Transylvania, Moldova and Transalpina name themselves Romans".
1574		Pierre Lescalopier writes that "those that live in Moldova, Wallachia and most of Transylvania consider themselves as being descendants of Romans and name their language romanian".
1575		Ferrante Capecci, after travelling through Wallachia, Transylvania and Moldova, mentions that the dwellers of these lands are named "romanesci".
1580		The Orăștie Palia is the oldest translation of the Pentateuch written in the Romanian language.
1600	27 May	Wallachian prince Michael the Brave briefly imposes his rule over Principality of Transylvania and Moldavia which had a Romanian population.

=== 17th century ===
Year	Date	Event
1601		The assassination of Michael the Brave ends the personal union between Transylvania, Moldova and Wallachia that had been established one year prior.
1605		Stephen Bocskay becomes Prince of Transylvania guaranteeing religious freedom and broadening Transylvania's independence.
1606		The Treaty of Vienna gives constitutional and religious rights and privileges to all Hungarian-speaking Transylvanians but none to Romanian-speaking people. The treaty guarantees the right of Transylvanians to elect their own independent princes in the future.
1613		Gabriel Bethlen becomes Prince of Transylvania succeeding to Gabriel Báthory. Under Bethlen's rule, the principality experiences a golden age. He promoted agriculture, trade, and industry, sank new mines, sent students abroad to Protestant universities, and prohibited landlords from denying an education to children of serfs.
1618		Transylvania take part to Thirty Years' War. Gabriel Bethlen invades Hungary and proclaims himself as King of Hungary.
1621		On December 31, Peace of Nikolsburg ends the war between Transylvania and Habsburgs. The conditions of Treaty of Vienna signed in 1606 are reinforced.
1632		The first war between Wallachia, led by Matei Basarab, and Moldavia led by Vasile Lupu.
1640		Grigore Ureche, in his The Chronicles of the land of Moldavia states that the language spoken by Moldavians is an amalgam of Latin, French, Greek, Polish, Turkish, Serbian, and so on, though assuming the preponderance of the Latin influence and claims that, at a closer look, all Latin words could be understood by Moldavians.
1648		Peace of Westphalia ends the Thirty Years' War. Transylvania is mentioned as a sovereign state.
1653		The second war between Matei Basarab and Vasile Lupu ends with the Moldavian throne being given to Gheorghe Ștefan.
1655		Seimeni revolt begins.
1657		George II Rákóczi invades Poland only to be defeated. The Ottoman Empire take advantage of the new situation and restore the military power in Transylvania.
1661		In April Prince Kemény proclaims the secession of Transylvania from the Ottomans and appeals to help from the Habsburg monarchy. He was not aware of the secret agreement between the Habsburg Empire and Ottomans and the move will end his reign. Transylvania becomes a vassal state of the Ottoman Empire.
1682		The capital of Transylvania is moved to Sibiu (then Nagyszeben);
1683		The defeat of Ottoman armies in Battle of Vienna means the end of Ottoman rule over Transylvania. The Roman Catholic Church becomes official church in Transylvania in a move directed by the Habsburgs to weak the noblemen estates, which were both Roman Catholic and Protestant.
1692		The Habsburgs control over Transylvania is consolidated even more and the princes are replaced with governors named directly by the Habsburg Emperors, who themselves become Princes of Transylvania.
1698		Bucharest becomes capital of Wallachia. Until then the capital was in Târgoviște. Constantin Brâncoveanu's 16-year reign commences during which period Wallachia enjoys a golden age.
1699		The Emperor Leopold I decrees Transylvania's Eastern Orthodox Church to be one with the Roman Catholic Church, by joining the newly created Romanian Greek-Catholic Church.
1699		Martinus Szent-Ivany mentions that the Vlachs use the following phrases "Si noi sentem Rumeni" meaning "we are Romanians too" and "Noi sentem di sange Romena", meaning "We are of Roman blood".

=== 18th century ===
Year	Date	Event
1711		Transylvania's direct-autonomy to Habsburg Empire ends, as the region comes under the administrative area of Hungary.
1714		Constantin Brâncoveanu and his sons are executed in Istanbul at the order of Sultan Ahmed III because they did not renounce their Christian faith. The sultan also did not agree with Brâncoveanu's alliance with the Habsburg and Russian empire.
1715		The Phanariote period starts. Nicholas Mavrocordatos becomes the first Phanariote prince of Wallachia. The influence of Ottoman Empire is greater than ever.
1716		The Habsburg Empire invades Wallachia during the Austro-Turkish War.
1718		Oltenia becomes part of the Habsburg Empire.
1739		Oltenia is reconquered by the Ottomans.
1746		Constantine Mavrocordatos enacts measures effectively abolishing serfdom in Wallachia and creates a more effective central administrative apparatus.
1749		Serfdom is abolished in Moldavia.
1765		The Grand Principality of Transylvania is proclaimed, consisting of a special separate status within the Habsburg Empire originally granted in 1691. This was however just a mere formality, as Transylvania is still an administrative area of Hungary.
1768		Wallachia is occupied by Russia during the Fifth Russo-Turkish War.
1784		The Revolt of Horea, Cloșca and Crișan starts in November and lasts until February in 1785. The main demands were related to the existence feudal serfdom and the lack of political equality between Orthodox Romanians and other Catholic ethnicities of Transylvania.
1791		Romanian-speaking Transylvanians petition to Emperor Leopold II for recognition as the fourth nation of Transylvania and for religious equality. Their demands are rejected and their old marginalised status is reinforced.

=== 19th century ===
Year	Date	Event
1801		Russia assumes a protective right over Romanian-speaking Christians in the Danubian lands and soon began to increase its influence in the region.
1802		Sámuel Teleki, then Chancellor of Transylvania, inaugurates the first library in Transylvania and present-day Romania. On December 15, János Bolyai is born in Cluj Napoca. Today the town's main university is named after him and Victor Babeș.
1806		Following the collapse of the Holy Roman Empire, the Habsburg Empire is reorganised and becomes the Austrian Empire.
1806		Wallachia is occupied by Russia.
1813		Caragea's plague claims 60,000 deaths in Wallachia during 1813 and 1814.
1817		Mihail Kogălniceanu is born. He will play a major role in the politics of Romania in second half of the 19th century;
1818		Ion Caragea adopts the first modern code of law in Wallachia.
1821		Following the death of Alexandros Soutzos a boyar regency is established.
1821		The anti-boyar and anti-Phanariote uprising takes place being led by Tudor Vladimirescu. On 28 May, a treaty is signed between Russian Empire and the Ottoman Empire ending the war with Bessarabia becoming part of the Russian Empire.
1821		The Phanariote rule ends. Moldavia is occupied by Alexander Ypsilantis's Filiki Eteria during the Greek War of Independence.
1822		Ionică Tăutu, representing a group of low-ranking boyars in Moldavia, proposes a constitutional project with republican and liberal principles;
1826		Local leaders in Moldavia are allowed to govern by the Ottoman Empire and Russian Empire.
1829		Following the Treaty of Adrianople, without overturning Ottoman suzerainty, places Wallachia and Moldavia under Russian empire military rule until Turkey pays an indemnity. Wallachia gains the rayas of Turnu, Giurgiu and Brăila, Russia annexes the Danube estuary.
1829		The seventh Russo-Turkish War brings Pavel Kiselyov at the leadership of Moldavia;
1834		Regulamentul Organic, a quasi-constitutional organic law is enforced in Wallachia and Moldavia. Sfatul Boieresc, the first Legislative Assembly in Wallachia is established.
1834		Regulamentul Organic, a quasi-constitutional organic law is enforced in Wallachia and Moldavia. Sfatul Boieresc, the first Legislative Assembly in Wallachia is established Mihail Sturdza, a man with unionist ideas, becomes Prince of Moldavia.
1844		The enslavement of Romani people ends.
1847		A custom union with Wallachia is established.
1848		The Revolution are very active in this part of Europe. The Hungarians demand more rights, including a provision on the union between Transylvania and Hungary. The Romanian-speaking Transylvanians carry their own parallel revolution led by Avram Iancu, which opposed the union with Hungary.
1848		During the Hungarian Revolution of 1848, the Hungarian government proclaimed union with Transylvania in the April Laws of 1848 which was later affirmed by the Transylvaniat Diet and the King.
1848		The Revolutions of 1848 spreads in Wallachia where the Romanian-speaking Wallachians try to overrule the Russian Empire's administration, demand the abolition of boyar privilege and a land reform. The revolutionaries are successful enough to create a provisional government in June and forced Gheorghe Bibescu, the Prince of Wallachia, to abdicate and leave into exile. A series of reforms follow the protests, the abolition of Roma slavery being one of them.
1848		The Revolutions of 1848 reach Moldavia but are less successful than in Wallachia, as the revolts are quickly suppressed.
1849		The revolt led by Avram Iancu obtains some rights for the Romanian-speaking Transylvanians, in spite of strong opposition from Hungary.
1849		Grigore Alexandru Ghica becomes prince of Moldavia. He introduces important administrative reforms and promotes economic development and education.
1849		After the failure of the Hungarian Revolution of 1848, the March Constitution of Austria decreed that the Principality of Transylvania be a separate crown land entirely independent of Hungary.
1850		Mihai Eminescu, regarded today as the most famous and influential Romanian poet, is born.
1854		The first railway line through Romania's present-day territory opens on August 20 and between Oravița in Banat and Baziaș.
1854		The Russian Empire protectorate ends. It is followed by an Ottoman occupation for several months and then a two-year-long Austrian occupation;
1856		Wallachia and Moldavia are brought under the influence of the Western European powers under the provisions of the Treaty of Paris.
1856		The end of the Crimean War heralds the end of Russia dominance in Moldavia.
1859		The National Party is founded. Its leader, Alexandru Ioan Cuza will play a major role in the formation of Romania just three years later.
1859		Alexandru Ioan Cuza is elected Prince of Moldavia on January 5. Three weeks later he is also elected Prince of Wallachia, thus achieving a de facto union of the two principalities under the name of Romania.
1860		University of Iași is established, as the first institution of higher education in Romanian language with faculties of literature, philosophy, law, science and medicine and schools in music and art. The Romanian Army is founded. Romania switches from Cyrillic script to the Latin script that is still in use today.
1861		On February 5, the 1859 union is formally declared and a new country, Romania is founded. The capital city is chosen to be Bucharest. On December 23, Abdülaziz, the Sultan of the Ottoman Empire officially recognizes the union but only for the duration of Cuza's reign.
1861		The Transylvanian Association for the Literature and Culture of the Romanians is founded in Sibiu, as the first cultural association of the Romanian-speaking Transylvanians.
1862		The Government of Romania is formed with Alexandru Constantin Moruzi as the first ever Prime Minister.
1863		Alexandru Ioan Cuza promulgates the Agrarian Reform in which the majority of the land is transferred into the property of those who worked it. As there was not enough land, the Secularization of monastery estates in Romania, in which large estates owned by the Romanian Orthodox Church are transferred under state ownership and then to private property, takes place. This was an important turning point in the history of Romania, as it marked the almost disappearance of the Boyar class, leaving the country to look towards capitalism and industrialization.
1864		The Parliament of Romania is formed. A tuition-free, compulsory public education for primary schools is introduced in Romania for the first time. Also a Criminal Code and a Civil Code, both based on the Napoleonic Code, are introduced.
1865		On January 1, Casa de Economii și Consemnațiuni, the first bank of Romania, is established. On June 19 Evangelis Zappas, one of the richest men in the world at that date dies at the age of 65. Born in the Ottoman Empire in today's Greece he lived in Romania most of his life.
1865		Romania becomes the first European country to abolish the death penalty. This, however, did not last, it is now abolished in Romania since 1990.
1866		On February 22, Alexandru Ioan Cuza is forced to sign his abdication, which was mainly caused by the Agrarian Reform from 1863 that made him many enemies. Due to the country's political troubles and its financial collapse, the Parliament takes the decision to place a foreign price on the vacant throne. On March 26, Karl of Hohenzollern-Sigmaringen becomes Prince of Romania as Carol. Originally, the offer was made to Prince Philippe, Count of Flanders but he refused. On April 1, the Romanian Academy is established. On July 1, the first constitution of Romania is ratified.
1867		On April 22 the Leu currency is adopted.
1867		After the Austro-Hungarian Compromise of 1867, the separate status of Transylvania ceased, it was incorporated again into the Kingdom of Hungary (Transleithania) as part of the Austro-Hungarian Empire.
1869		The Bucharest – Giurgiu railway works are concluded after four years and the line become the first of this kind in Romania. However, it is not the first railway built on the present territory of Romania. The first railway was built in 1854 in Banat.
1870		The short-lived Republica Ploiești is formed in the city of Ploiești as part of a revolt against the Prince.
1877		On April 16, Romania and the Russian Empire sign a treaty under which Russian troops are allowed to pass through Romanian territory, with the condition to respect the integrity of Romania. On 21 May, the Parliament of Romania declare the independence of the country. In the fall Romania join the Russo-Turkish War on the Russian Empire side. In November, deeply defeated in the Battle of Plevna, the Ottoman Empire request an armistice.
1878		Romania independence is recognised by the Central Powers on July 13. Following the Treaty of Berlin, Romania now include territories of Northern Dobruja, the Danube Delta, and Insula Șerpilor. In return the southern counties of Bassarabia are returned to Russian Empire.
1880		National Bank of Romania is established in April. The bank's first governor was Eugeniu Carada. Căile Ferate Române, Romania's state-owned railway company starts its operations.
1881	March 26	Carol I is crowned as King. His wife Elisabeth becomes Queen. Romania becomes kingdom.
1881	12 May	The National Party of Romanians in Transylvania is formed as the first party of the Romanians in Transylvania.
1881	August 19	George Enescu is born.
1882		The Stock Exchange opens in Bucharest.
1884		The first ever telephone in Romania is installed.
1885		Patriarch Joachim IV signs the recognition of the autocephalous status of the Romanian Orthodox Church that granted it equal rights with those of the other orthodox churches.
1886		The construction of the Athenaeum begins. Although the work would continue until 1897, the first concert took place in 1886 and it was performed by Bucharest Philharmonic Orchestra.
1889		Mihai Eminescu dies aged 39.
1892		The Transylvanian Memorandum is signed by the leaders of the Romanians to the Austro-Hungarian Emperor Franz Joseph, asking for equal ethnic rights with the Hungarians, and demanding an end to persecutions and Magyarization attempts. The memorandum was forwarded to the Hungarian Parliament and the results was that the Romanian leaders are sentenced to long terms in prison.
1894		Leaders of the Transylvanian Romanians who sent a Memorandum to the Austrian Emperor demanding national rights for the Romanians are found guilty of treason.
1895		King Carol I Bridge is inaugurated on September 26. At the time it was the longest in Europe and second longest in the world.
1896		The construction of Port of Constanța begins. Since then it has been the most important port in Romania. In May, cinema arrives in Romania for the first time.
1900		The Post Palace is inaugurated. Today it houses the National Museum of Romanian History.

=== 20th century ===
Year	Date	Event
1904		The first refinery, a Romanian-American joint venture is founded and to process oil produced in the Prahova River valley.
1906		Traian Vuia Achieved a short hop of 20 meters at 1 meter height in his aircraft, Vuia 1.
1906		Aurel Popovici, a Transylvanian lawyer and politician, proposes the federalization of the Austro-Hungarian monarchy into the so-called United States of Greater Austria under the model of United States of America with a total of 15 component states, Transylvania being one of them.
1907		Violent peasant revolts crushed throughout Romania, thousands of persons killed.
1913		At the end of the Balkan Wars, Romania acquires the southern part of the Dobruja from Bulgaria.
1913	April 1	The Parliament votes to enact the law of the military aviation, Romania being the fifth nation in the world to have an air force.
1914	October 10	Carol I dies and is succeeded by his nephew, Ferdinand, who becomes the second King of Romania as Ferdinand I. His wife, Maria becomes queen.
1916		Despite choosing to stay away from the World War I, the death of King Carol I and the course of events made Romania to change its view and decide to switch sides in favor of the Entente, demanding the territory of the Kingdom of Hungary of until the Tisza River. The demands of the Romanian Government were accepted and following the First Treaty of Bucharest. Romania declare war to the Central Powers on 27 August and launches attacks against Kingdom of Hungary through the Southern Carpathians and into Transylvania. Poorly trained and equipped, the Romanian Army cannot face the power of the Austro-Hungarian, German, Bulgarian and Ottoman armies and Bucharest was occupied on 6 December 1916 by the Central Powers. Iași becomes temporarily the capital city of Romania.
1917	August 6	The Battle of Mărășești, the retreat of the Russian Army from Romania left the Romanians no choice but to ask for peace. (to September 8)
1917		On 9 December 1917, the Armistice of Focsani was an agreement that ended the hostilities between Romania and the Central Powers.
1918		The Second Treaty of Bucharest is signed on 7 May.
1918		The Hungarian army was disarmed on 2 November, and Austria-Hungary signed the armistice on 3 November 1918. One day before the German armistice, Romania re-entered the war on 10 November with similar objectives to those of 1916. On 12 November, the Romanian army crossed the Hungarian border and entered in Transylvania. On 28 November the Romanian representatives of Bucovina voted for union with the Kingdom of Romania, followed by the proclamation of the union of Transylvania with the Kingdom of Romania on 1 December, by the representatives of Transylvanian Romanians and of the Transylvanian Saxons gathered at Alba Iulia. The declaration included 26 counties of the Kingdom of Hungary, the territory until the Tisza River, Banat, and Máramaros county. Both proclamations were not, however, yet recognized by the Entente powers.
1919		On 1 May, the entire east bank of the Tisza River was under the control of the Romanian Army. On 17 July, Béla Kun, the leader of the Hungarian Soviet Republic, decides to counterattack the Romanian Army at the Tisza river to regain the occupied territories of the Kingdom of Hungary without any success. The collapse of the Hungarian Soviet Republic by the Romanian offensive led to the occupation of Budapest, the Hungarian capital in August. Afterwards, by the Treaty of Versailles and later by the Treaty of Trianon and the Kingdom of Romania expands its borders, referred as Greater Romania during the interwar period.
1920	January 20	Romania becomes a founding member of League of Nations. The CFRNA (French-Romanian Company for Air Navigation) is established, becoming the first airline in Romania.
1921	April 23	Romania and Czechoslovakia sign a peace treaty in Bucharest. It will be followed by a similar treaty between Romania and Yugoslavia signed it Belgrade one month later. A new land reform takes place, suggested by King Ferdinand I, who wanted to repay the soldiers and their families for sacrifices made during the war.
1922		King Ferdinand I and Queen Maria are crowned in Alba Iulia as King and Queen of all Romanians.
1925		The Romanian Orthodox Church is officially recognized.
1927	July 20	King Ferdinand I dies and Mihai I, his grandson, becomes the third King of Romania after his father Carol renounced to his rights to the throne in two years earlier.
1927	July 24	On July 24, the Iron Guard is formed by Corneliu Zelea Codreanu. The Iron Guard will play a major role in the Romanian political and social system over the next decade and a half.
1929		The worldwide Great Depression affects Romania as well.
1930	June	Carol II returns to Romania on June 7 and is proclaimed King one day later, thus becoming the fourth King of Romania and the first born in Romania. The Societatea Anonimă Română de Telefoane is established and Romania starts to use landline telephone on a wide scale.
1933	December	On December 10, Ion Duca, Prime Minister of Romania at the time, bans the Iron Guard. On December 29, Ion Duca is assassinated by members of the paramilitary organization.
1937		A new palace is built to replace the old residence of the heads of states of Romania, which has been in use for over a century. Today the National Museum of Art of Romania is located in the palace.
1938		In a bid for political unity against the fascist movement known as the Iron Guard, which was gaining popularity, Carol II dismissed the government headed by Octavian Goga. The activity of the Romanian Parliament and of all political parties was suspended and the country is governed by royal decree. Miron Cristea, the first Patriarch of the Romanian Orthodox Church become Prime Minister on February 11.
1939		Nazi Germany and the Soviet Union sign the Molotov–Ribbentrop Pact, in which the Soviet side claims Bessarabia. The territory, together with the northern part of Bukovina, is occupied by the Soviet Union one year later.
1939	September 21	Armand Călinescu, Prime Minister of Romania, is assassinated by the Iron Guard.
1940		On June 27, following an ultimatum issued by the Soviet Union, Romania loses Bessarabia and Northern Bukovina. On August 30, under the Second Vienna Award, Romania loses the northern part of Transylvania to Hungary. Only one week later the Kadrilater/Southern Dobruja is lost to Bulgaria. On September 4, Horia Sima, leader of the Iron Guard, and Ion Antonescu, a Romanian Army General, Prime Minister of Romania at that date, form the "National Legionary State" in Romania, forcing the abdication of King Carol II. Michael I becomes king for the second time two days later. On October 8, Nazi troops begin crossing into Romania. On November 23, Romania joins the Axis powers.
1941	January 21	A rebellion organized by the Iron Guard takes place in Bucharest. Later known as the Legionnaires' rebellion and Bucharest pogrom, it was a reaction to the decision made by Ion Antonescu to cut off the privileges of the Iron Guard. During the rebellion, 125 Jews and 30 army soldiers were killed. After order is restored, the Iron Guard is banned. (to January 23)
1941	June 22	Romania joins Operation Barbarossa, attacking the Soviet Union hoping to recover the lost territories of Bessarabia and Bukovina. Later, Romania annexes Soviet lands immediately east of the Dnister.
1942–1943		Romania becomes a target of Allied aerial bombardment. The old refineries in Ploiești are bombed on August 1, 1943, during Operation Tidal Wave.
1944		On August 23, King Michael I leads a successful coup with support from opposition politicians and the army. Ion Antonescu is arrested. On September 12, an Armistice Agreement is signed with the Allied powers. Romania join the Allied powers. In October Winston Churchill, Prime Minister of the United Kingdom, proposed a percentages agreement with Soviet dictator Joseph Stalin on how to split up Eastern Europe into spheres of influence after the war; the Soviet Union was offered a 90% share of influence in Romania. Battle of Romania begins.
1945		On March 1, Petru Groza becomes the first Communist Prime Minister of Romania after Nicolae Rădescu was forced to submit his resignation by the Soviet Union's deputy People's Commissar for Foreign Affairs, Andrei Y. Vishinsky. Later on that year Romania takes part in the Battle on Budapest as well as the Battle on Prague. Despite joining only the Allies only in August 1944, Romania had an important contribution to shortening WWII by six months, according to Sir Winston Churchill.
1946		The Romanian Communist Party wins the elections amid unrest and allegations of electoral fraud by opposition groups and the government of the United Kingdom.
1947		Following the abdication of Mihai I, the People's Republic of Romania is declared on December 30 against the majority of people who supported the monarchy. The new leader of Romania becomes Gheorghe Gheorghiu-Dej, General Secretary of the Romanian Communist Party;
1948		A new constitution is ratified on April 13. Two months later, on June 11 all banks and major enterprises are nationalized. During the year, also in the years to come, many pre-war politicians, businessmen, priests and even ordinary people are thrown in prisons. On August 30, following the model of Soviet NKVD, the Romanian secret police is formed;
1949		A forced collectivization, in which the agriculture is organized under the socialist model, comes into force. Romania join Comecon. The construction of Danube-Black Sea Canal starts. The canal was the most known labour camp in the history of Romania;
1951		During the night of June 18 the third-largest mass deportation in modern Romanian history takes place. Some 45,000 people are taken from their homes and deported to the Bărăgan plain;
1952		The Hungarian Autonomous Province, the one and only autonomous province in modern Romania, is created. It will be disestablished in 1968. The second Communist constitution is ratified;
1953		The Danube-Black Sea Canal is halted and the labour camp disestablishedied Iuliu Maniu dies in Sighet prison;
1954		SovRoms, joint ventures between Romania and Soviet Union are formed. They will prove their inefficiency for Romania from the first day of establishment and most of them will be dissolved in 1956;
1955		Romania joins the Warsaw Pact. On February 14, a group of Romanian anti-Communists occupies the Romanian embassy in Bern demanding the release from prisons of many public personalities. With the help of the Swiss police, the order is re-established two days later. On December 14, Romania join the United Nations;
1956		On October 28 a radio station calling itself "Romania of the future. The voice of resistance" begins broadcasting on different wavelengths. Many protests, especially amongst students, follows in November. On December 31, Televiziunea Română start to broadcast first programmes;
1957		ARO is established in Câmpulung-Muscel and start to manufacture off-road vehicles. ARO IMS become the first car built in Romania after World War II. Over the next three decades ARO will be a landmark of Romania.
1958		The Soviet Union Army leave Romania after fourteen years of occupation;
1959		On July 28, the Ioanid Gang carries out the most famous bank robbery ever to occur in a Communist state;
1960		Oliviu Beldeanu, the leader of the group that occupied the Romanian embassy in Bern five years earlier, is executed in Bucharest;
1965		On March 19, Gheorghe Gheorghiu-Dej dies and Nicolae Ceaușescu is elected General Secretary of the Romanian Communist Party and becomes the state leader. The official name of the country is changed into The Socialist Republic of Romania. The third Communist constitution is ratified;
1966		Intreprinderea de Autoturisme Pitești is established. Two years later Romania start the mass production, the first mass production of a car – Dacia 1100. Nicolae Ceaușescu orders that the abortion decree signed in 1957 to be reversed and new policies to increase birth rate and fertility rate are introduced. The policy fails, as the population begins to swell, accompanied by rising poverty and increased homelessness children in the urban areas;
1968		Romania refuse to participate in the invasion of Czechoslovakia. Nicolae Ceaușescu openly condemns the action, thus he becomes a Western world favourite. Richard Nixon's visit to Romania was the first by an American president to a Communist country. The Patriotic Guards are formed as an additional defence force in case of an attack from the outside;
1972		In order to develop a "multilaterally socialist society", Nicolae Ceaușescu starts urban planning, following the ideologies of North Korea. The face of the country is completely changed in the years to come;
1974		Nicolae Ceaușescu becomes the first President of Romania. Romania become the first country in the Eastern Bloc ever to establish economic relations with the European Community. The Generalised System of Preferences is signed, followed by an Agreement on Industrial Products in 1980.
1976		At the age of 14, Nadia Comăneci becomes one of the stars of the 1976 Summer Olympics in Montreal. During the team portion of the competition, her routine on the uneven bars is scored at a 10.0. It is the first time in modern Olympic gymnastics history that the score had ever been awarded. Over the next years, Nadia will become one of the best known Romanians in the world;
1976		The Danube-Black Sea Canal project restarts;
1977		On 4 March 21:20 local time, an earthquake occurs with a magnitude of 7.4 and epicentre in Vrancea at a depth of 94 kilometres. The earthquake killed about 1,570 people and injured more than 11,000. Total damages are estimated at more than two billion dollars. On 1 July 35,000 out of 90,000 miners in Jiu Valley decide to stop working. Their protest is the biggest of this kind in Communist Romania before the 1989 revolution. The strike only ends when Nicolae Ceaușescu intervened in person.
1978		Ion Mihai Pacepa, a senior officer in Securitate, defected to the United States becoming the highest ranking defector from the Eastern Bloc;
1980		Construction of the Cernavodă Nuclear Power Plant begins. The fourth Communist constitution is ratified;
1981		The 1981 Summer Universiade becomes the most important sport event ever to be hosted by Romania. Dumitru Prunariu becomes the first Romanian in space;
1983		As part of the urban planning programme, significant portions of the historic centre of Bucharest are demolished in order to accommodate standardized apartment blocks and government buildings, including the grandiose Centrul Civic and the palatial House of the People, the second largest government building in the world;
1984		Romania is, alongside People's Republic of China and Yugoslavia, one of the three Communist countries to take part to the 1984 Summer Olympics in Los Angeles, USA. The Danube-Black Sea Canal is finally completed after nearly four decades;
1986		On 7 May, Steaua București win the European Cup and become the first football team from a Communist country to win the trophy;
1987		In a climate of economic depression and food shortages a rebellion erupts on November 15 in the city of Brașov. Over 300 protesters are arrested for hooliganism.
1989		On December 16, protests break out in Timișoara. Five days later Nicolae Ceaușescu organises a mass meeting in Bucharest. The jeers and whistles soon erupt into a riot, as the crowd takes to the streets, placing the capital in turmoil. Nicolae Ceaușescu and his wife leave Bucharest putting an end to four decades of Communist rule in Romania. On December 25, after a short trial, Nicolae Ceaușescu and his wife are executed.
1989		The National Salvation Front (FSN) take the power during the Romanian Revolution. The leader is elected Ion Iliescu. The new name of the republic becomes Romania;
1990		On 20 May, free elections are held in Romania for the first time after fifty years. FSN, which became a political party, win the elections. Iliescu is elected the second President of Romania. Before and after the elections, a protest initiated by the students and professors of University of Bucharest, which was also supported by many intellectuals, demanded that former members of the Romanian Communist Party, which included Iliescu, should be banned from elections. The protest was ended by the intervention of the miners from Jiu Valley, brought to Bucharest by Iliescu himself in what is remembered as the June 1990 Mineriad;
1991		A new constitution is ratified;
1992		Elections are held and Iliescu wins a second mandate. Privatization of the industry starts;
1993		Romania apply to become a member of the European Union. The first wireless telephony system becomes active;
1995		The Stock Exchange reopens in Bucharest;
1996		Emil Constantinescu becomes the third President of Romania;
1997		Romania join the countries able to use GSM telephony;
2000		Iliescu returns to power after winning the elections;

== 3rd millennium ==
=== 21st century ===
Year	Date	Event
2004		On April 2, Romania joins the NATO. Traian Băsescu becomes the fifth President of Romania on 20 December.
2007		On January 1, Romania joins the European Union, together with Bulgaria. Traian Băsescu was temporarily suspended for alleged constitutional violations and replaced with Nicolae Văcăroiu.
2008		In February the Government overrule court decision that commission investigating Communist-era secret police is illegal. For two days, starting on April 2, Romania host 2008 NATO summit. Legislative election are held on November 30. Emil Boc becomes the new Prime Minister following the elections.
2009		Badly affected by the Great Recession, the International Monetary Fund and other lenders agree to provide Romania a rescue package worth 20bn Euros. A Government crisis begins in April when the Social Democratic Party pulls out of ruling coalition, leaving Prime Minister Emil Boc the head of minority government, which subsequently loses a confidence vote in parliament. On December 6, Traian Băsescu is re-elected as president for a second mandate after marginally winning the presidential election in front of Mircea Geoană.
2012	January 12	Large protests against Prime Minister Victor Ponta. (to 2015)
2014	December 21	Klaus Iohannis becomes the sixth President of Romania, who is also the first ethnic German President of Romania.
2021	September 1	The beginning of the 2021 Romanian political crisis caused by disagreements by USR PLUS over the investment program and sacking of Justice Minister Stelian Ion.

== See also ==
Cities in Romania

- Timeline of Bucharest
- Timeline of Cluj-Napoca
- Timeline of Iași
- Timeline of Sibiu

== Sources ==
- Bărbulescu, Mihai (2005). "From the Romans until the End of the First Millenium AD". In Pop, Ioan-Aurel; Nägler, Thomas (eds.). The History of Transylvania, Vol. I. (until 1541). Romanian Cultural Institute. pp. 137–198. ISBN 973-7784-04-9.
- Bertényi, Iván (1989). Nagy Lajos király [King Louis the Great]. Kossuth Könyvkiadó. ISBN 963-09-3388-8.
- Birley, Anthony R. (2000) [1987]. Marcus Aurelius: A Biography (2nd ed.). Routledge.
- Bóna, István (1994). "From Dacia to Transylvania: The Period of the Great Migrations (271–895); The Hungarian–Slav Period (895–1172)". In Köpeczi, Béla; Barta, Gábor; Bóna, István; Makkai, László; Szász, Zoltán; Borus, Judit (eds.). History of Transylvania. Akadémiai Kiadó. pp. 62–177. ISBN 963-05-6703-2.
- Cortés, Juan Manuel (1995). "La datación de la expedición de los Costobocos: la subscripción de XXII K de Elio Arístides". Habis. 25: 187–193.
- Croitoru, Costin (2009). "Despre organizarea limes-ului la Dunărea de Jos. Note de lectură (V)". Istros. XV: 385–430.
- Curta, Florin (2006). Southeastern Europe in the Middle Ages, 500–1250. Cambridge: Cambridge University Press.
- Fiedler, Uwe (2008). "Bulgars in the Lower Danube region: A survey of the archaeological evidence and of the state of current research". In Curta, Florin; Kovalev, Roman (eds.). The Other Europe in the Middle Ages: Avars, Bulgars, Khazars, and Cumans. Brill. pp. 151–236. ISBN 978-90-04-16389-8.
- Fine, John V. A (1991). The Early Medieval Balkans: A Critical Survey from the Sixth to the Late Twelfth century. The University of Michigan Press. ISBN 0-472-08149-7.
- Gherghel, Ilie (1920). Cateva consideratiuni la cuprinsul notiunii cuvantului "Vlach" (in Romanian). Bucuresti: Convorbiri Literare.
- Jefferson, John (2012). The Holy Wars of King Wladislas and Sultan Murad: The Ottoman-Christian Conflict from 1438–1444. Leiden: Brill Publishers. ISBN 978-90-04-21904-5.
- Jesch, Judith (2001). Ships and Men in the Late Viking Age: The Vocabulary of Runic Inscriptions and Skaldic Verse. Woodbrige: The Boydell Press. ISBN 0851158269.
- Johnson, Diane (2011). "Libanius' Monody for Daphne (Oration 60) and the Eleusinios Logos of Aelius Aristides". In Schmidt, Thomas; Fleury, Pascale (eds.). Perceptions of the Second Sophistic and its times. pp. 199–214.
- Kovács, Péter (2009). Marcus Aurelius' rain miracle and the Marcomannic wars. Brill.
- Kristó, Gyula (1988). A vármegyék kialakulása Magyarországon ("The formation of counties in Hungary"). Budapest: Magvető Könyvkiadó. ISBN 978-963-14-1189-8.
- Kristó, Gyula (2003). Early Transylvania (895-1324). Lucidus Kiadó. ISBN 963-9465-12-7.
- Madgearu, Alexandru (2005b). The Romanians in the Anonymous Gesta Hungarorum: Truth and Fiction. Romanian Cultural Institute, Center for Transylvanian Studies. ISBN 973-7784-01-4.
- Madgearu, Alexandru (2016). The Asanids: The Political and Military History of the Second Bulgarian Empire, 1185–1280. BRILL. ISBN 978-9-004-32501-2.
- Pritsak, Omeljan (1981). The Origin of Rus': Old Scandinavian Sources Other than the Sagas. Cambridge, Massachusetts: Harvard University Press. ISBN 0-674-64465-4.
- Sălăgean, Tudor (2005). "Romanian Society in the Early Middle Ages (9th–14th Centuries AD)". In Pop, Ioan-Aurel; Bolovan, Ioan (eds.). History of Romania: Compendium. Romanian Cultural Institute (Center for Transylvanian Studies). pp. 133–207. ISBN 978-973-7784-12-4.
- Scheidel, Walterl (1990). "Probleme der Datierung des Costoboceneinfalls im Balkanraum unter Marcus Aurelius". Historia. 39: 493–498.
