= 1941 in Romania =

- Decades: 1920s; 1930s; 1940s; 1950s; 1960s
- See also: Other events of 1941; History of Romania; Timeline of Romanian history; Years in Romania

Events from the year 1941 in Romania.

== Incumbents ==
- King: Michael I
- Prime Minister: Ion Antonescu

== Events ==
- January 21–23 – Legionnaires' rebellion and Bucharest pogrom results in the disestablishment of the National Legionary State
- March 5 – March 1941 Romanian policy referendum
- April 1 – Fântâna Albă massacre
- June 26 – Raid on Constanța
- June 27 – Iași pogrom
- July 2–24 – Operation München
- August 8–October 16 – Siege of Odessa
- November 9 – November 1941 Romanian policy referendum

== Births ==
- February 1 – Teofil Codreanu, footballer (died 2016)
- February 3 – Ștefan Iordache, actor (died 2008)
- February 4 – Șerban Cantacuzino, actor (died 2011)
- February 13 – Paul Dan Cristea, professor of engineering (died 2013)
- March 10 – Teodor Meleșcanu, politician and diplomat
- April 29 – Mircea Veroiu, film director and screenwriter (died 1997)
- June 3 – Constantin Bușoiu, wrestler
- June 14 – Viorel P. Barbu, mathematician
- June 19 – Irina Petrescu, actress (died 2013)
- July 1 – Nicolae Saramandu, linguist and philologist
- July 14 – George Anania, science fiction writer, playwright, and translator (died 2013)
- July 30 – Gheorghe Condovici, gymnast
- September 8 – Dan Coe, footballer (died 1981)
- September 20 – Constantin Ciucă, boxer
- October 3 – Nicolae Șerban Tanașoca, historian and philologist (died 2017)
- November 15 – Corneliu Ciontu, politician
- November 24 – Emil Hossu, actor (died 2012)
- December 25 – Ioan Alexandru, poet, essayist, and politician (died 2000)

== Deaths ==
- February 4 – David Emmanuel, mathematician (born 1854)
- March 17 – Nicolae Titulescu, diplomat and politician (born 1882)
- April 7 – Lazăr Edeleanu, chemist (born 1861)
- April 8 – Nuși Tulliu, poet and prose writer (born 1872)
- June 5 – Alexandru Nicolescu, bishop (born 1882)
- June 19 – Elena Popea, painter (born 1879)
- June 24 – Maria Baiulescu, author, suffragist, women's rights activist (born 1860)
- June 26 – Nicolae Minovici, forensic scientist (born 1868)
- July 2 – George Valentin Bibescu, early aviation pioneer (born 1880)
- July 8 – Alexandru Bassarab, painter (born 1907)
- July 19 – Filimon Sârbu, communist activist (born 1916; executed)
- August 6 – Izabela Sadoveanu-Evan, literary critic, educationist, journalist, poet and feminist militant (born 1870)
- August 6 – Alexandru Baltagă, Bessarabian priest (born 1861; died in Soviet custody)
- September 17 – Alexandru Ioanițiu, general (born 1890; killed in accident near Odessa)
- September 20 – Petre Sucitulescu, footballer and soldier (killed in action at Dalnik)
- October 22 – Ioan Glogojeanu, general (born 1888; killed in explosion at Odessa)
- November 7 – Francisc Panet, chemical engineer and communist activist (born 1907; executed)
- December 6 – Teodor Neaga, Bessarabian politician (born 1878)

== Bibliography ==
- Axworthy, Mark; Scafes, Cornel; Craciunoiu, Cristian (1995). Third Axis Fourth Ally: Romanian Armed Forces in the European War, 1941–1945. London: Arms & Armour Press. ISBN 1-85409-267-7.
