= 1945 in Romania =

- Decades: 1920s; 1930s; 1940s; 1950s; 1960s
- See also: Other events of 1945; History of Romania; Timeline of Romanian history; Years in Romania

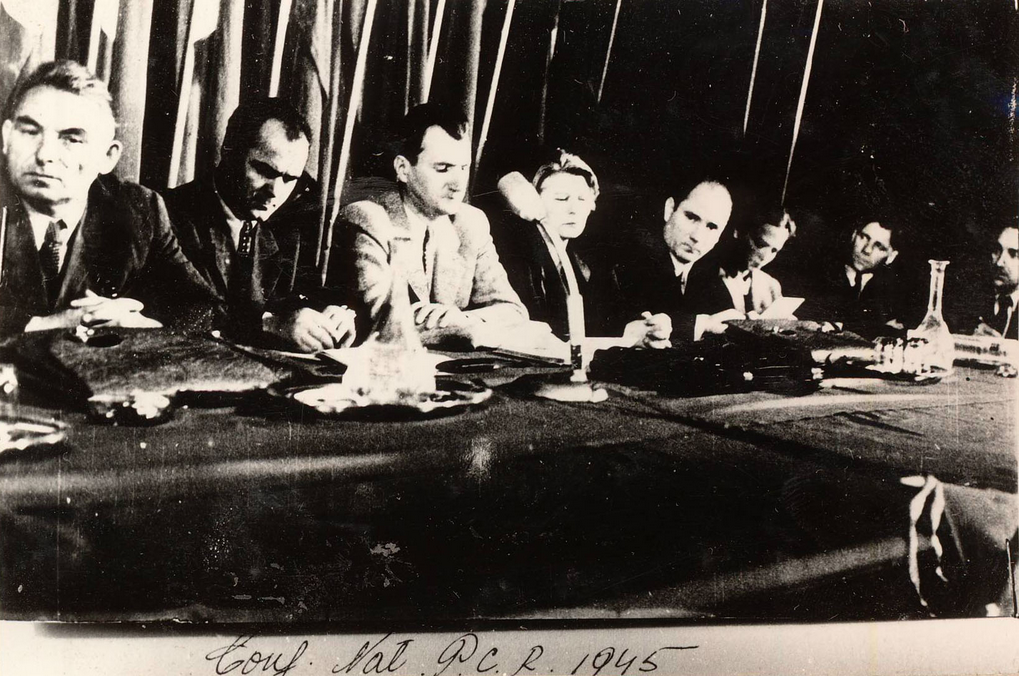
National Conference P.C.R. in October 1945 (aspect of hall) (16 to 21 October 1945)

Events from the year 1945 in Romania. The year saw the end of Romania's involvement in World War II and the foundation of the pro-Communist government of Petru Groza.

== Incumbents ==
- King: Michael I.
- Prime Minister:
  - Nicolae Rădescu (until 6 March).
  - Petru Groza (from 6 March).

== Events ==
- 13 February – The Budapest Offensive and the Siege of Budapest end with Nazi troops surrendering Budapest, Hungary, to Soviet-Romanian forces.
- 24 February – In Bucharest, the Communist Party and its allies organize a mass rally in front of the Royal Palace to call for Prime Minister Nicolae Rădescu's resignation. As the protest carries on, communist agents open fire from the Interior Ministry building situated across the street, killing several people.
- 28 February – Andrey Vyshinsky, Soviet vice commissioner of foreign affairs and president of the Allied Control Commission for Romania, travels to Bucharest and demands from King Michael I the resignation of Rădescu; at the direction of Joseph Stalin, he warns that the Soviet Union would not allow Northern Transylvania to be returned to Romania if Rădescu were to remain prime minister. Rădescu resigns his position the next day.
- 6 March – A pro-Communist government is formed under Petru Groza, following Soviet intervention.
- 12 May – The last German troops capitulate, bringing Romania's involvement in the Second World War to an end.
- 21 August – In response to the government not resigning as he requested, King Michael starts the "royal strike", refusing the sign any decrees, a situation that continues into the following year.
- 8 November – A pro-monarchy demonstration in front of the Royal Palace escalates into street fighting which kills and wounds dozens. Order is restored by Soviet troops.

== Births ==
- 5 January – Constantin Radu, footballer (died 2020).
- 3 February – Napoleon Pop, economist and politician (died 2023).
- 4 February – Aureliu Manea, theatre director, actor, and writer (died 2014).
- 6 March – Paul Grigoriu, journalist and writer (died 2015).
- 25 March – Dumitru Antonescu, footballer (died 2016).
- 24 April – Miron Chichișan, politician, mayor of Zalău (died 2016).
- 10 May – Judith Dibar, tennis player.
- 24 June – Constantin Gruiescu, Olympic boxer.
- 6 July – Doru Davidovici, aviator and writer (died 1989).
- 24 July – Constantin Mihail, athletics coach (died 2016).
- 29 July – Mircea Lucescu, football player and manager (died 2026).
- 4 September – Doina Furcoi, Olympic handball player.
- 19 September – Ruxandra Sireteanu, behavioural neuroscientist (died 2008).
- 22 November – Melania Decuseară, Olympic diver.
- 1 November – Vasile Ianul, football player and manager (died 2013).
- 18 November – Petru Dugulescu, Baptist pastor, poet, and politician (died 2008).
- 1 December – Ghiță Licu, handball player (died 2014).

== Deaths ==
- 1 February – Ion Șiugariu, poet and soldier, killed in action in Slovakia during World War II (born 1914).
- 3 March – Gheorghe Avramescu, general, died in Slovakia during World War II while in NKVD custody (born 1884).
- 15 March – Sava Caracaș, general (born 1890).
- 4 April – Berta Bock, composer (born 1857).
- 7 April – Elizabeth, Princess Bibesco, novelist, playwright and poet (born 1897).
- 17 April – Ion Pillat, poet (born 1891).
- 29 May – Mihail Sebastian, playwright, journalist and novelist (born 1907).

== Bibliography ==
- Cioroianu, Adrian (2005). Pe umerii lui Marx. O introducere în istoria comunismului românesc [On the Shoulders of Marx. An Incursion into the History of Romanian Communism] (in Romanian). Bucharest: Editura Curtea Veche. ISBN 978-973-669-390-8.
- Serafin, Steven, ed. (2000). Twentieth-century Eastern European Writers. Detroit: Gale. ISBN 978-0-78763-129-1.
