= 2016 in Romania =

- Decades: 1990s; 2000s; 2010s; 2020s
- See also: Other events of 2016; History of Romania; Timeline of Romanian history; Years in Romania

The following lists events in the year 2016 in Romania.

== Incumbents ==
- President: Klaus Iohannis
- Prime Minister: Dacian Cioloș

== Events ==
=== January ===
- 29 January – President Klaus Iohannis promulgates a law banning smoking in public areas, two days after the CCR declared it constitutional.

=== February ===
- 5 February – Five people are killed and 28 seriously injured after a bus and a tip lorry collide on the Western Belt of Ploiești.
- 10 February – Former commander of Râmnicu Sărat Penitentiary Alexandru Vișinescu is sentenced to 20 years imprisonment for crimes against humanity, becoming the first communist torturer to be convicted in Romania.
- 16 February
  - The warmest day of February of the last 55 years, with temperatures 18 °C higher than the normal in Bucharest.
  - Three babies die and several dozens from Prahova, Dolj and Bucharest are hospitalized with HUS-associated symptoms after being infected with a bacterium of unknown provenance.

=== March ===
- 14 March – The death toll of the Colectiv nightclub fire reaches 64, almost five months after the tragedy.

=== May ===
- 9 May – Minister of Health Patriciu Achimaș-Cadariu resigns due to mismanagement of the diluted disinfectants crisis.
- 12 May – US and NATO officials activate a land-based missile defense station at Deveselu, part of a larger and controversial European shield.
- 29 May – 20 people are injured after a footbridge breaks during an electoral event in Plopu, Prahova County.

=== June ===
- 1 June – About 10,000 employees in the education system protest in Bucharest, demanding the resignation of the Cioloș Cabinet, dissatisfied with the teacher pay scale proposed by the Government.
- 5 June – Local elections are held across Romania. The Social Democratic Party comes in first with 38.98% of mayor seats nationwide, including Bucharest, followed by the National Liberal Party with 31.50%.

=== July ===
- 5 June – Prime Minister Dacian Cioloş announces a cabinet shuffle as the four ministers (Education, Transport, Communications and Diaspora) are replaced. The new ministers took office on 7 July.

=== September ===
- 13 September – French President François Hollande begins a one-day state visit to Romania, the first state visit by a French president since François Mitterrand came to Romania in 1991.
- 24 September – A magnitude 5.3 earthquake strikes Vrancea County, with tremors being felt as far as Bucharest and the Republic of Moldova. This is the largest deep earthquake since 2009.

=== November ===
- 5 November – A 29-car pile-up on Sun Motorway results in four deaths and nearly 60 injuries.

=== December ===
- 2 December – A shooting left at least 3 people dead including the gunman and another 2 were injured. The shooting occurred in Palilula a village in Dolj County.
- 11 December – 2016 Romanian legislative election

== Sports ==
- 2 March – 2015–16 Cupa României: 1st leg semi-final
- 20 April – 2015–16 Cupa Romaniei: 2nd leg semi-final
- 8 May – CSM București wins the Women's EHF Champions League trophy, after beating Győri Audi ETO KC by a score of 29–26 (13–12, 22–22), after overtime and 7-meter throws, in the final held at the László Papp Sports Arena in Budapest.
- 14 May – 2016 Cupa României Final
- 10 June – UEFA Euro 2016 Group A: France v. Romania
- 15 June – UEFA Euro 2016 Group A: Romania v. Switzerland
- 19 June – UEFA Euro 2016 Group A: Romania v. Albania
- 5–21 August – 97 athletes (34 men and 63 women) from the Romanian national team competed at the 2016 Summer Olympics in Rio de Janeiro, Brazil, recording the country's poorest performance at the Summer Olympics since 1952.

== Arts and entertainment ==
- Lara Fabian returns to Romania for two new concerts, in Cluj-Napoca, on 20 April, and Bucharest, on 22 April.
- 22 April – Romania is expelled from the Eurovision Song Contest 2016 after its national broadcaster TVR failed to pay debts dating back to 2007. This is the first time in the 61-year history of the Eurovision Song Contest a country is expelled from the competition.
- 18–22 May – The seventh edition of the International Poetry Festival takes place in Bucharest, featuring over 100 poets from more than 20 countries.
- 11-12 June – Dutch violinist André Rieu and Johann Strauss Orchestra held two concerts in Bucharest.
- 21 June – Queen and Adam Lambert played for the first time in Romania, in the Constitution Square of Bucharest.
- 4–7 August – The second edition of Untold Festival took place in Cluj-Napoca.

== Deaths ==
=== January ===
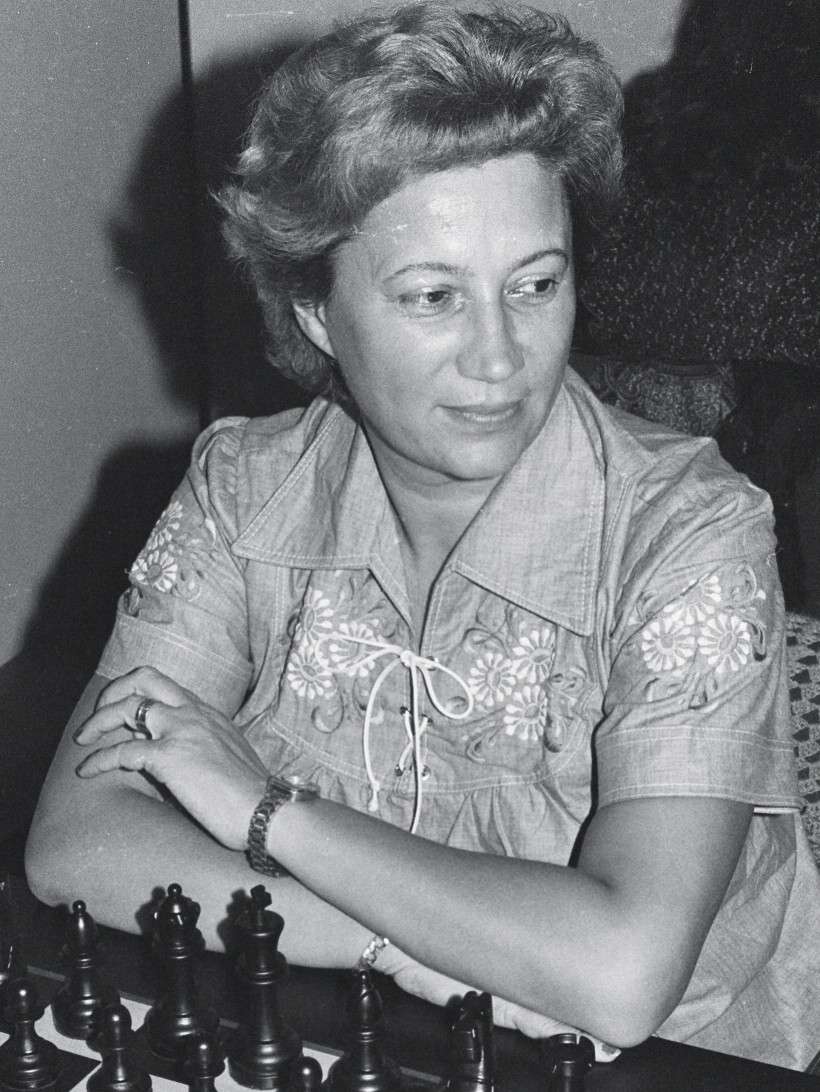
Elisabeta Polihroniade

- 2 January – George Alexandru, actor (b. 1957)
- 7 January – Cristian Moisescu, Mayor of Arad (1992–96) (b. 1947)
- 10 January – Teofil Codreanu, footballer (b. 1941)
- 12 January – Melania Ursu, actress (b. 1940)
- 16 January – Theodor Danetti, actor (b. 1926)
- 17 January – Ion Panțuru, bobsledder (b. 1934)
- 18 January – Silvia Kerim, journalist and children's books writer (b. 1932)
- 22 January – Constantin Mihail, athletics coach (b. 1945)
- 23 January – Elisabeta Polihroniade, chess player (b. 1935)
- 26 January – Aurora Dumitrescu, history teacher and political prisoner (b. 1932)
- 27 January – Elena Negreanu, actress and film director (b. 1918)
- 31 January – Miron Chichișan, Mayor of Zalău (1992–96) (b. 1945)

=== February ===
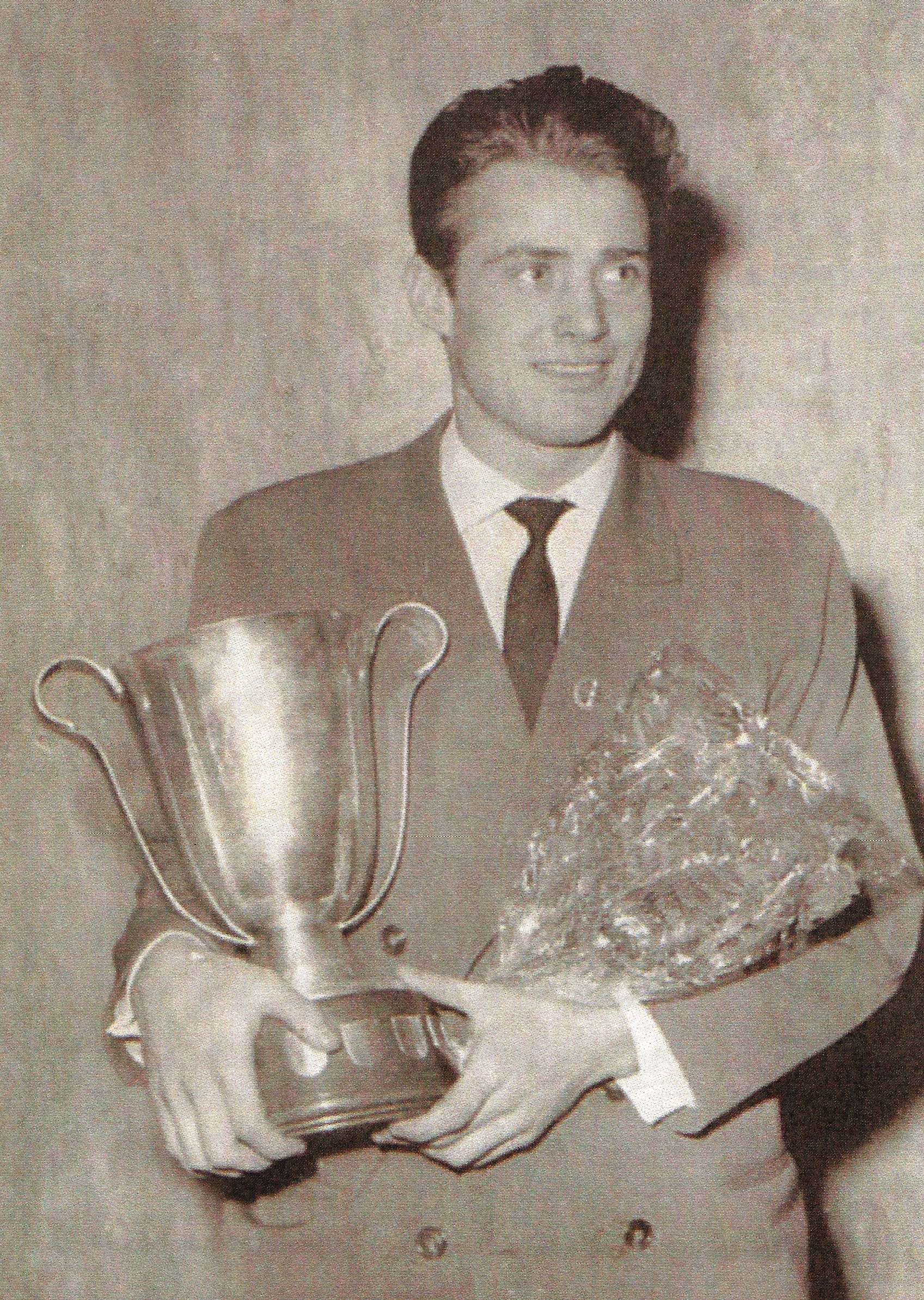
Mircea Costache II

- 9 February – Alexandru Vulpe, historian and archaeologist, member of Romanian Academy (b. 1931)
- 10 February – Stan Gheorghiu, football player and coach (b. 1949)
- 16 February – Mircea Costache II, handball player (b. 1940)
- 17 February – Gelu Barbu, ballerino and choreographer (b. 1932)
- 18 February – Rudolf Fischer, historian and linguist (b. 1923)
- 21 February – Pascal Bentoiu, composer and musicologist (b. 1927)
- 28 February – Gheorghe Blănaru, writer (b. 1933)

=== March ===
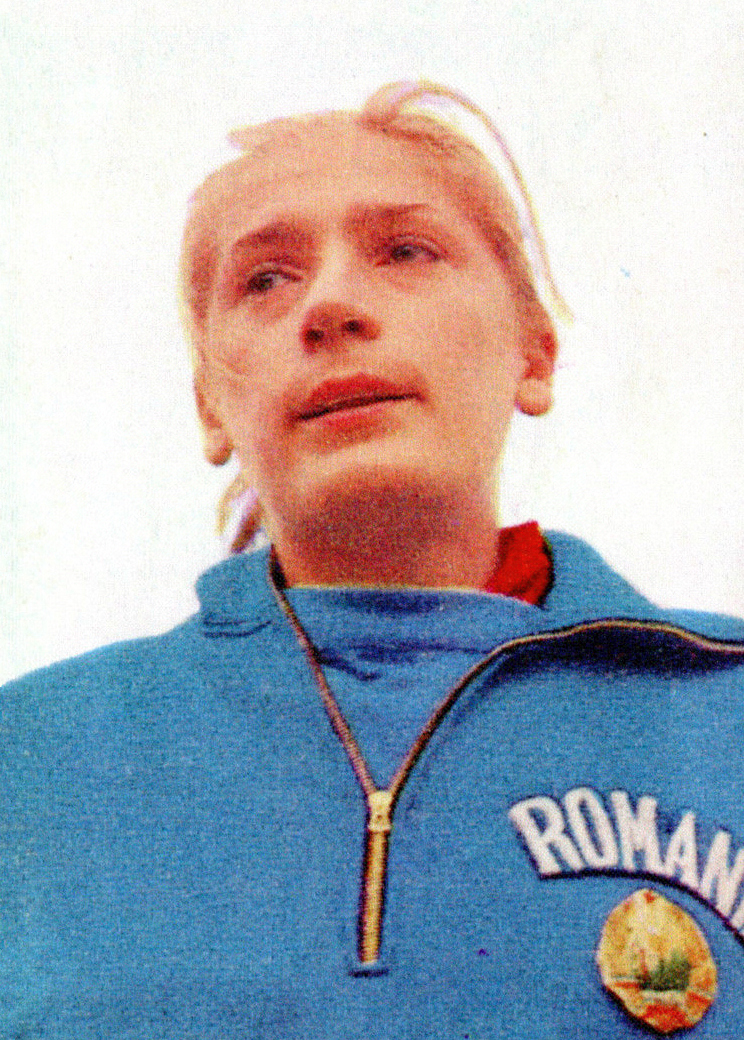
Iolanda Balaș

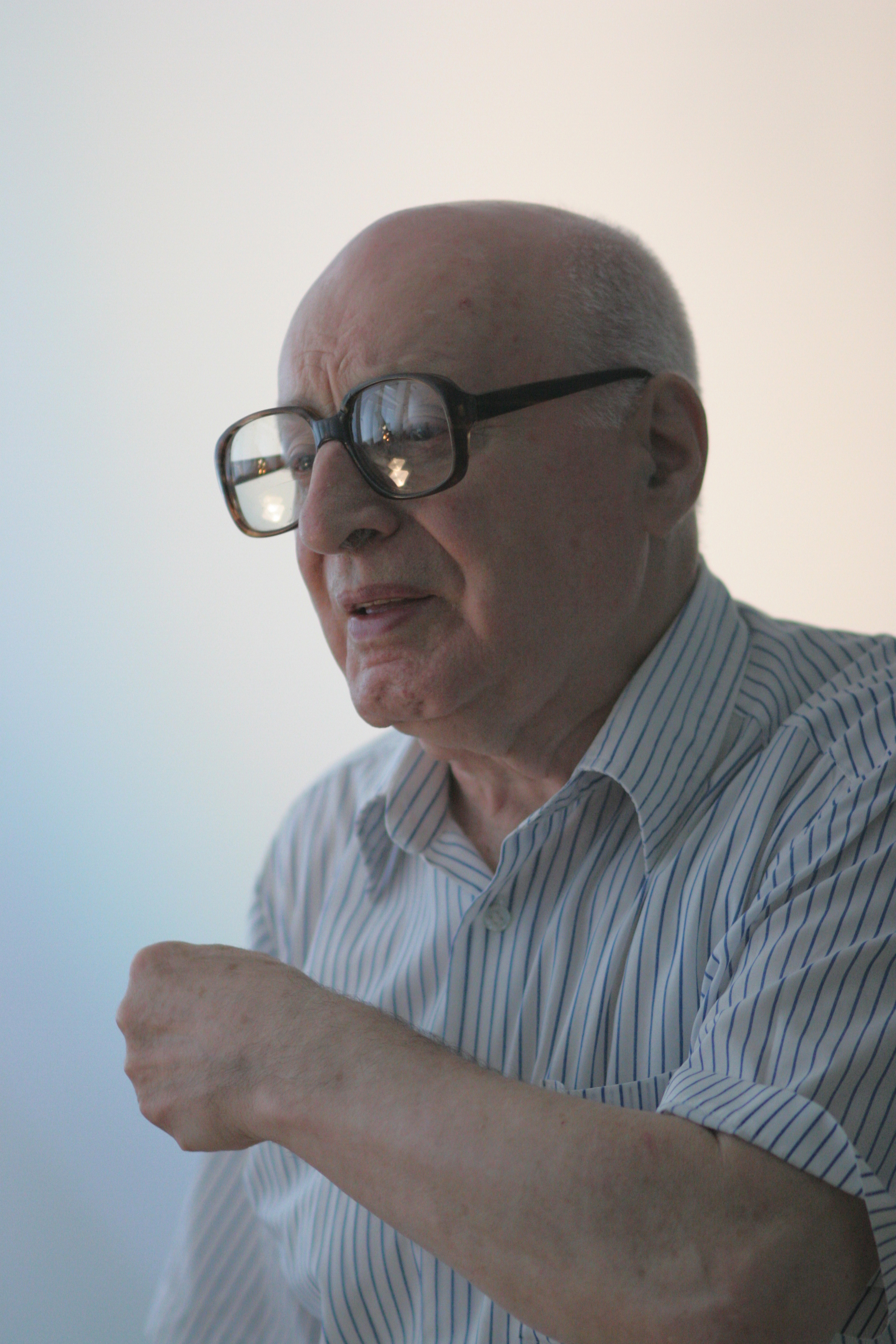
Solomon Marcus

- 3 March – Gheorghe Tokay, politician (b. 1939)
- 8 March
  - Chiriac Bucur, writer and diplomat (b. 1932)
  - Sorin Toma, journalist and politician (b. 1914)
- 11 March – Iolanda Balaș, Olympic high jumper (b. 1936)
- 17 March
  - Solomon Marcus, mathematician, member of Romanian Academy (b 1925)
  - Paula Sorescu-Lucian, theatre actress (b. 1942)
- 18 March – Șerban Iliescu, journalist and linguist (b. 1955)
- 26 March – Radu Mareș, writer (b. 1941)
- 27 March – Mihail Coculescu, endocrinologist, member of Romanian Academy (b. 1943)
- 28 March – Petru Mocanu, mathematician, member of Romanian Academy (b. 1931)
- 30 March – Aristotel Stamatoiu, director of Romanian Intelligence Service (1986–1990) (b. 1929)

=== April ===
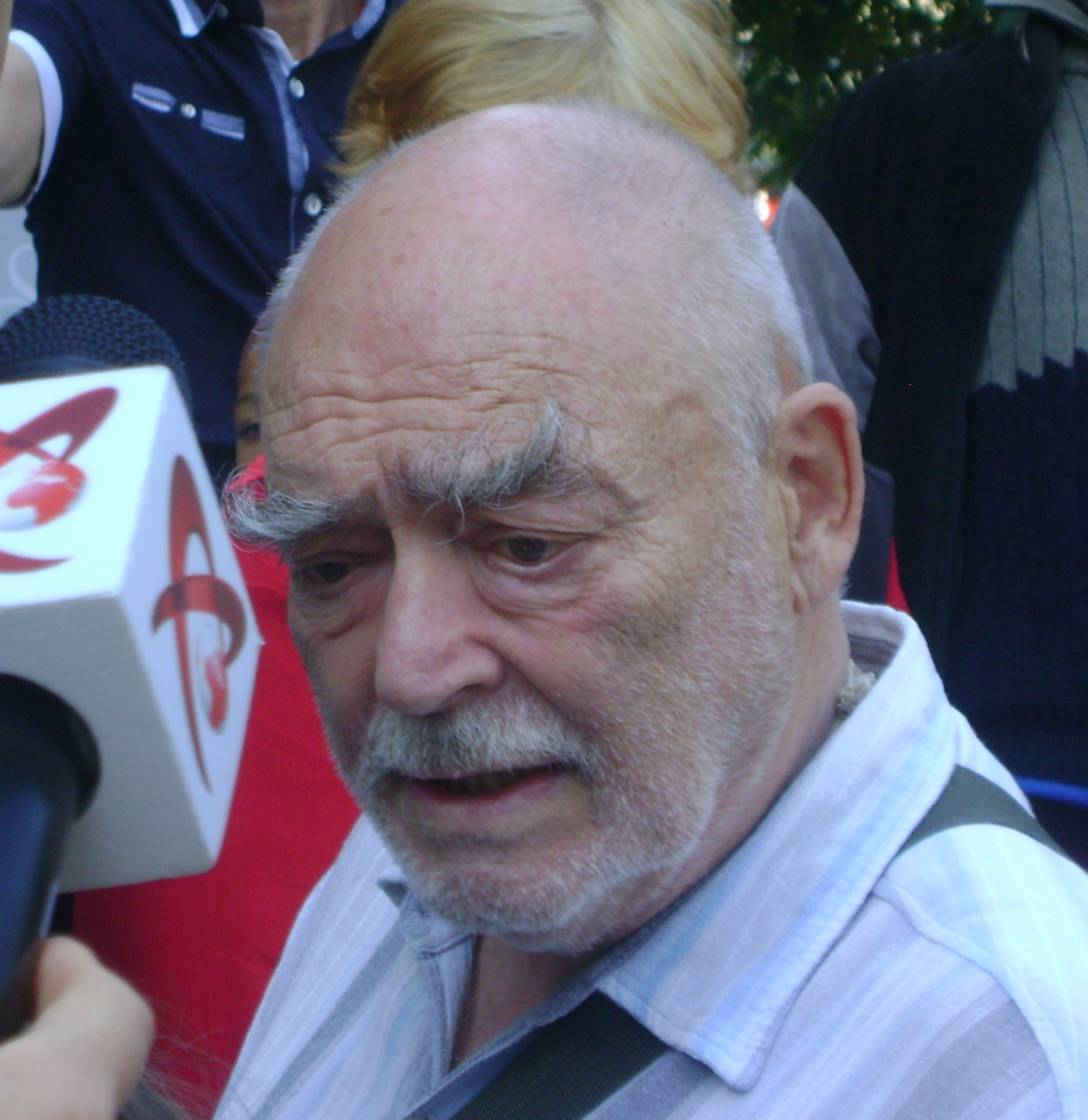
Mircea Albulescu

- 5 April – Cornel Patrichi, ballerino, choreographer and actor (b. 1944)
- 6 April – Nicolae Munteanu, sports journalist (b. 1922 or 1923)
- 7 April – Fane Spoitoru, businessman (b. 1959)
- 8 April – Mircea Albulescu, actor (b. 1934)
- 13 April – Márton Balázs, mathematician (b. 1929)
- 21 April – Valeriu Cotea, oenologist, member of Romanian Academy (b. 1926)
- 25 April
  - Dumitru Antonescu, footballer (b. 1945)
  - Neculai Rățoi, Mayor of Pașcani (b. 1939)
- 29 April – Gianu Bucurescu, director of Securitate (1985–1989) (b. 1934)

=== May ===
- 13 May – Doina Florica Ignat, politician, member of the Senate of Romania (b. 1938)
- 14 May – Neculai Alexandru Ursu, linguist, philologist and literary historian (b. 1926)
- 17 May – Alexandru Lăpușan, politician, Minister of Agriculture (b. 1955)
- 20 May
  - Vasile Duță, politician, member of the Senate of Romania (b. 1955)
  - Bogdan Ulmu, theatre director and writer (b. 1951)
- 22 May – Dan Condrea, businessman (b. 1975)
- 25 May – József Tempfli, Roman Catholic bishop (b. 1931)
- 26 May – Ted Dumitru, football manager (b. 1939)
- 30 May – Andrei Ciontu, engineer (b. 1933)
- 31 May – Mihail Gabriel Corgoja, economist (b. 1977)

=== June ===
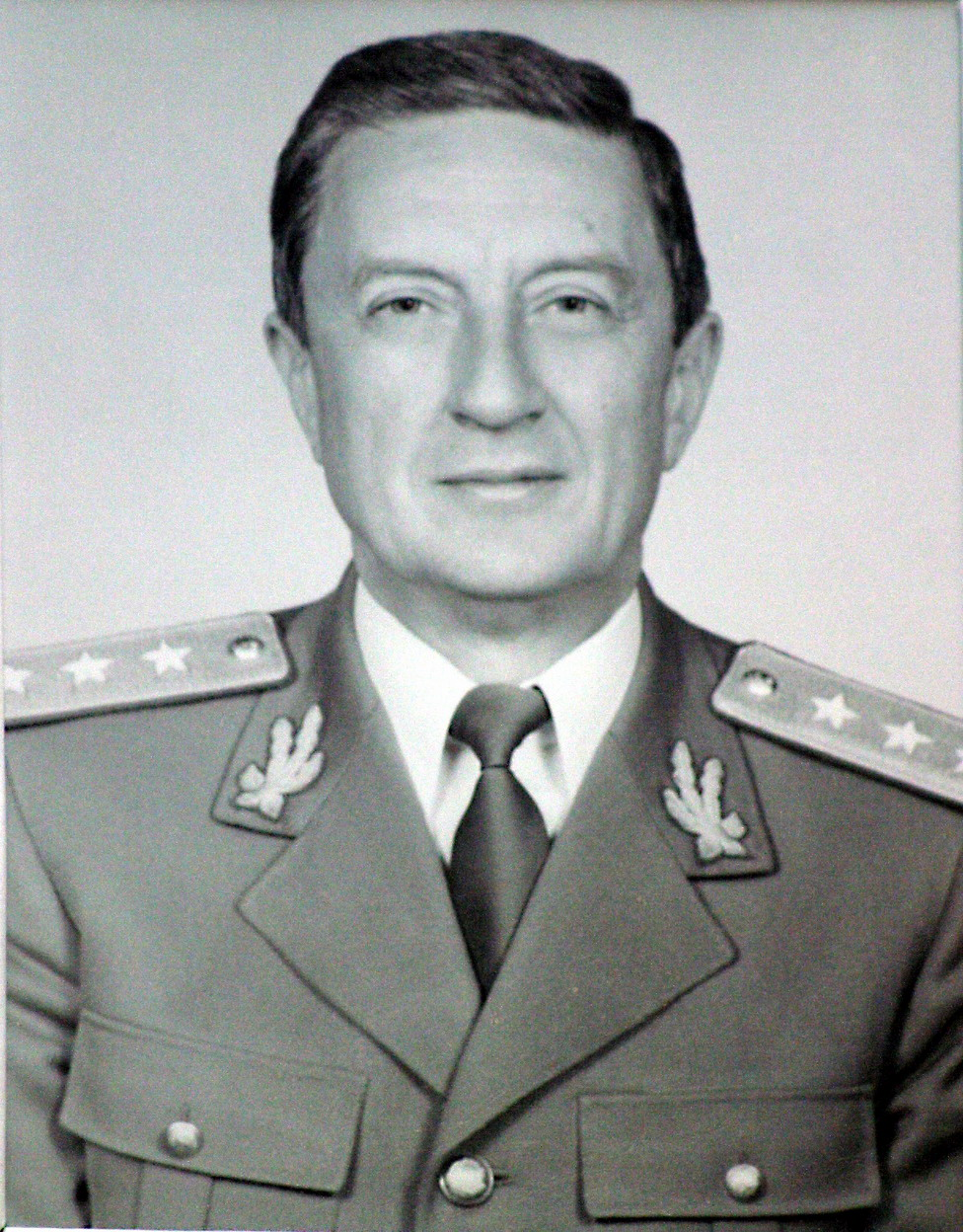
Victor Stănculescu

- 1 June – Grigore Obreja, sprint canoeist (b. 1967)
- 5 June – Lucian Gheorghiu, journalist (b. 1955)
- 6 June – Mihai Dragolea, writer (b. 1955)
- 8 June
  - Alexandru Bizim, athletics coach (b. 1934)
  - Gheorghe Buluță, philologist (b. 1947)
- 10 June – Nicolae Păsărică, oină player (b. 1955)
- 11 June – Sigismund Gram, footballer (b. 1933)
- 13 June
  - Viorel Mihai Ciobanu, jurist and university professor (b. 1950)
  - Ioan-Liviu Negruț, politician, member of the Chamber of Deputies of Romania (b. 1937)
- 14 June – Ilie Călian, journalist (b. 1942)
- 18 June
  - Mircea Chiorean, physician, co-founder of SMURD (b. 1933)
  - Nae Cosmescu, theatre and television director (b. 1940)
- 19 June
  - Mihnea Berindei, historian (b. 1948)
  - Nicolae Bocșan, historian (b. 1947)
  - Victor Stănculescu, general officer and politician (b. 1928)

=== July ===
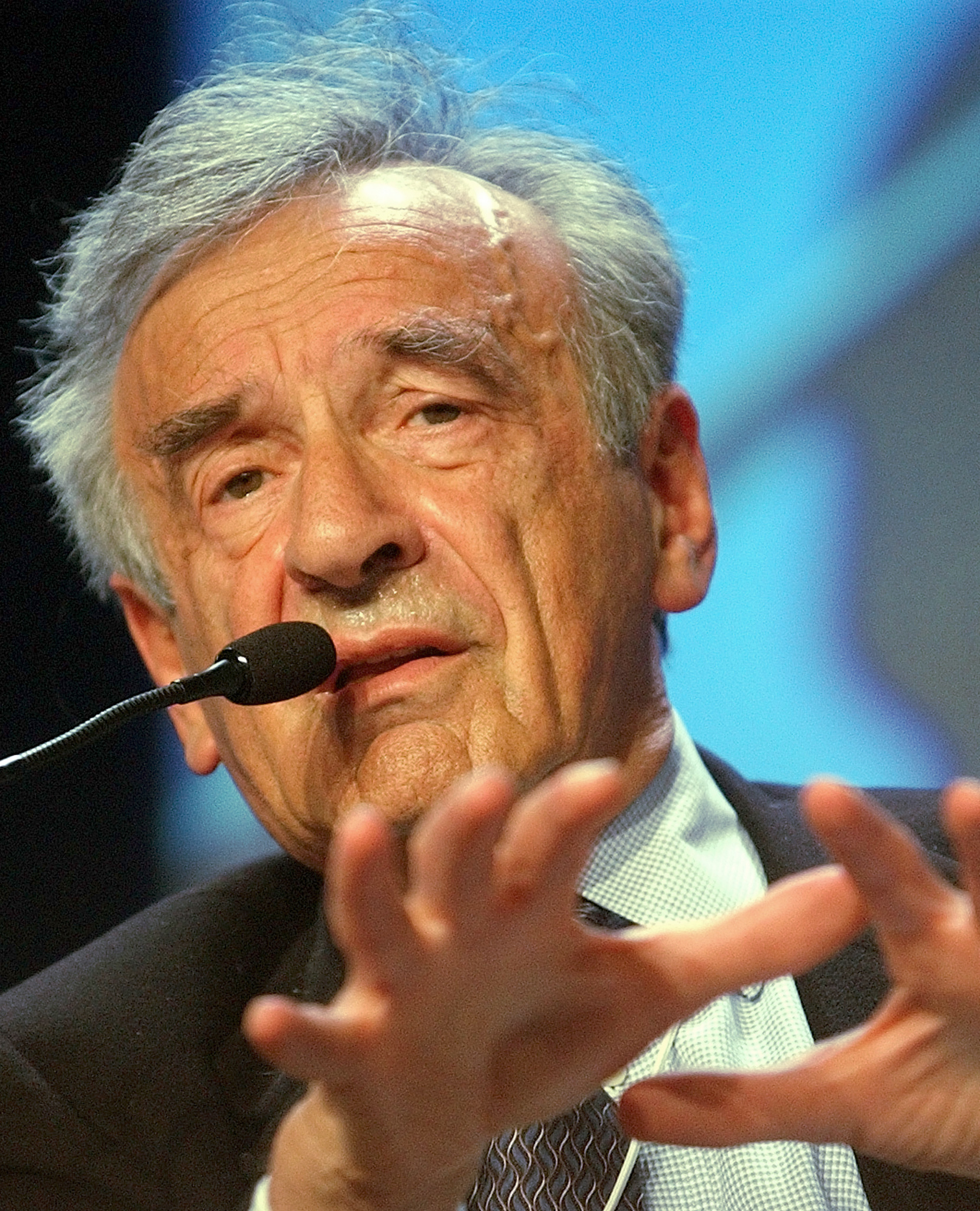
Elie Wiesel

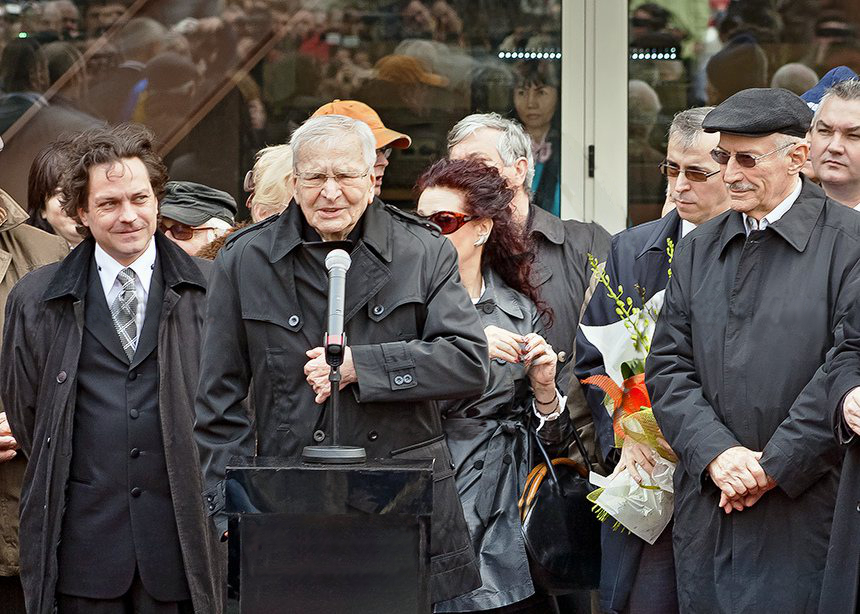
Radu Beligan (center)

- 1 July
  - Ion Ianoși, writer and essayist (b. 1928)
  - Gheorghe Drobotă, rugby union player (b. 1934)
- 2 July – Elie Wiesel, writer, professor, political activist, Nobel laureate and Holocaust survivor (b. 1928)
- 8 July – Dan Dermengiu, physician (b. 1957)
- 11 July – Dale Băsescu, actor (b. 1956)
- 18 July – Medi Wechsler Dinu, painter (b. 1908)
- 20 July
  - Radu Beligan, actor (b. 1918)
  - Nicolae Duță, rugby union player (b. 1943 or 1944)
- 21 July – Alexandru Jidveianu, singer (b. 1968)
- 28 July – Constantin Busuioceanu, director, editor and lecturer (b. 1924)

=== August ===
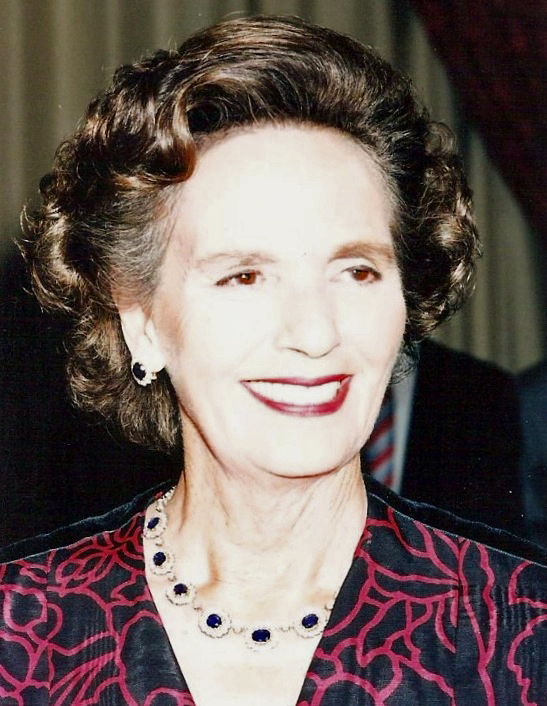
Queen Anne of Romania

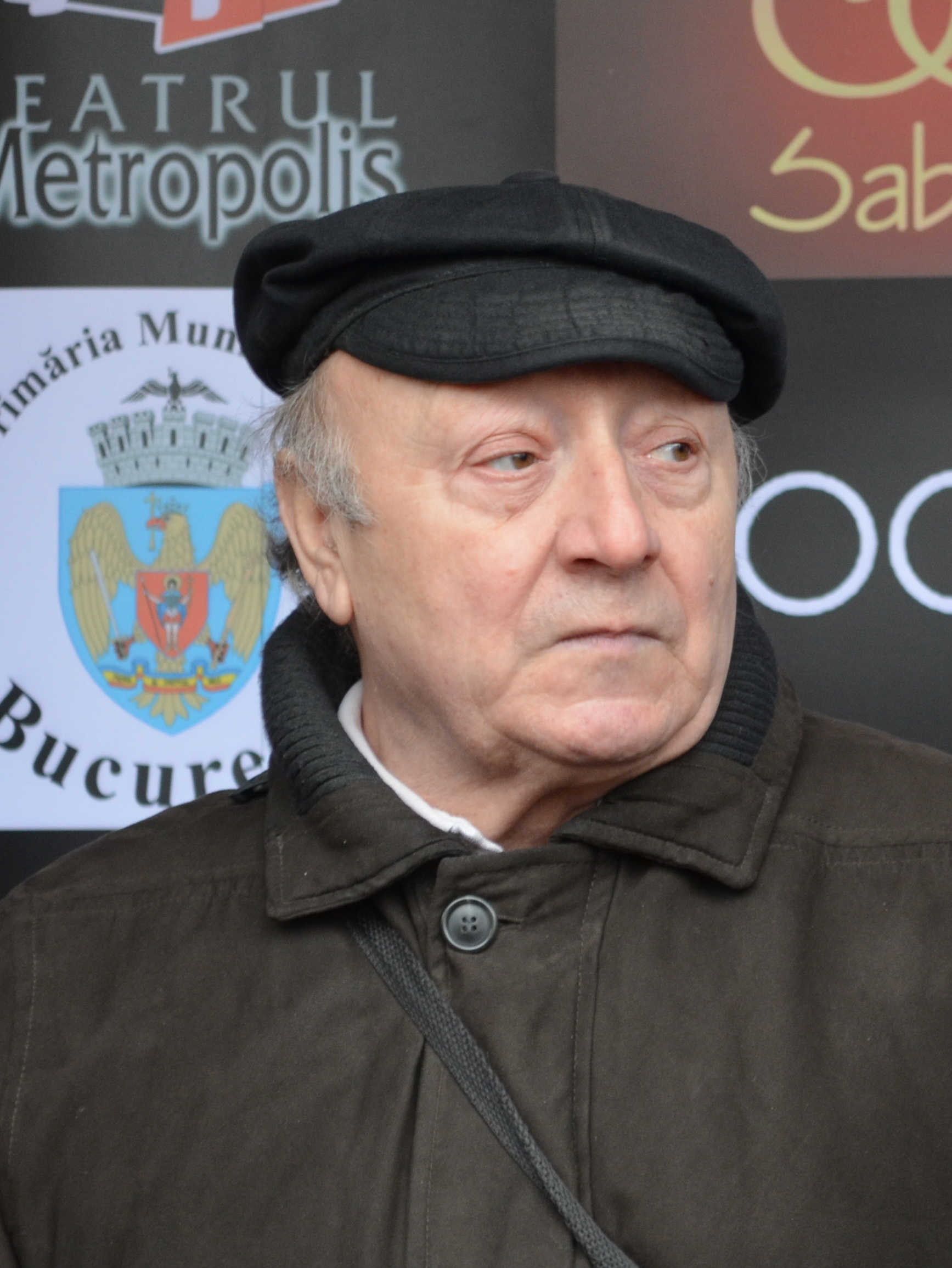
Marin Moraru

- 1 August – Queen Anne of Romania (b. 1923)
- 3 August – Paul Gherasim, painter (b. 1925)
- 4 August – Alexandru Mészáros, footballer (b. 1933)
- 5 August – Ionel Lupu, dendrologist (b. 1934)
- 6 August – Iosif Viehmann, speleologist (b. 1925)
- 7 August – Nicolae Mărășescu, athletics coach and politician (b. 1937)
- 12 August – Dénes Sándor, professor (b. 1936)
- 19 August – Adrian Enescu, musician and composer (b. 1948)
- 21 August – Marin Moraru, actor (b. 1937)

=== September ===
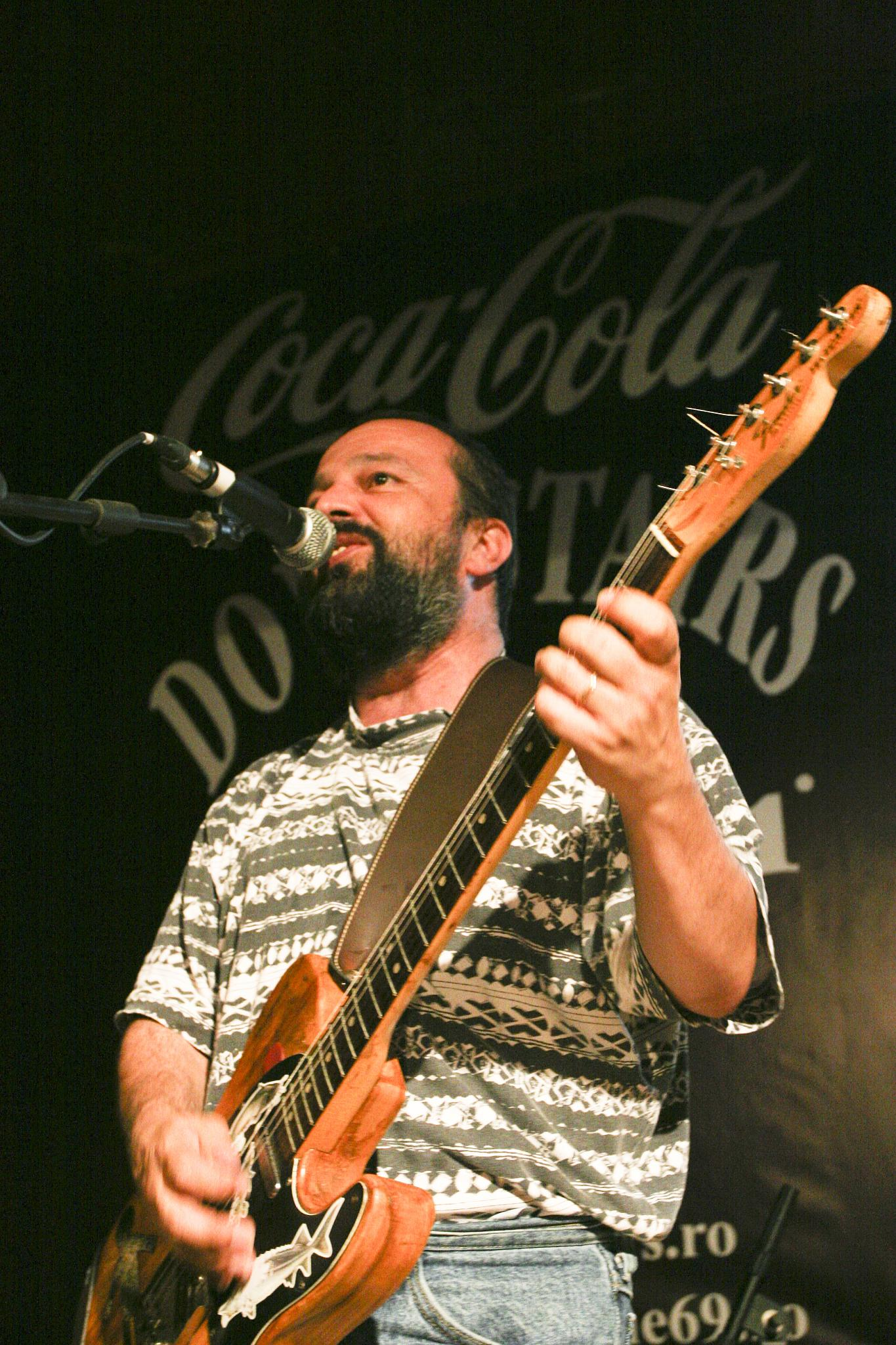
Ioan Gyuri Pascu

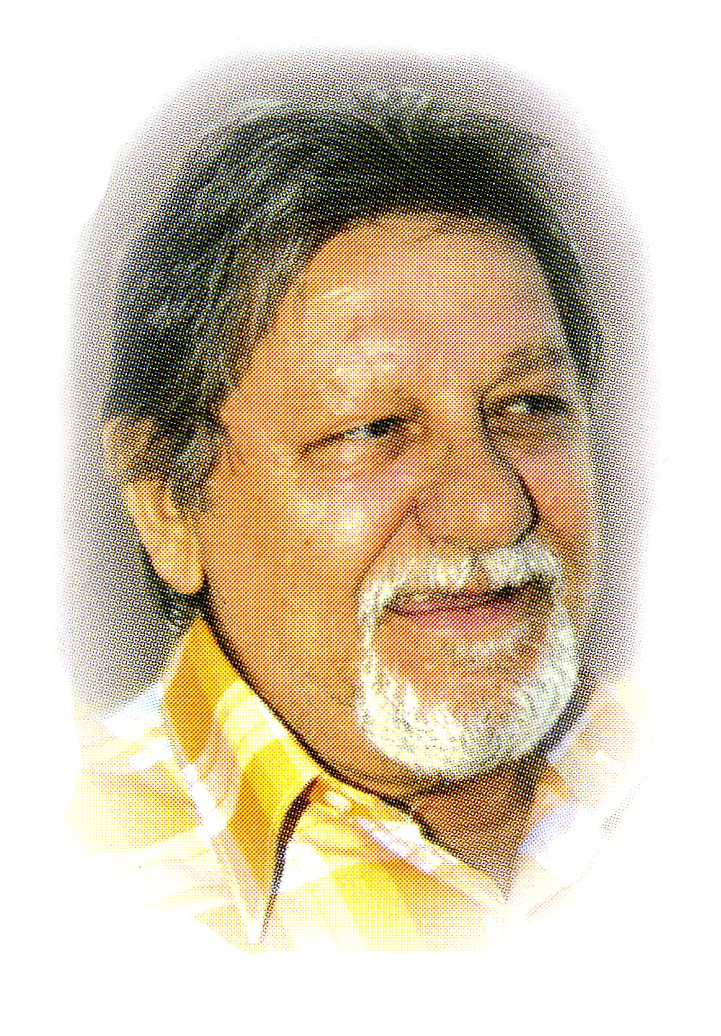
Sebastian Papaiani

- 1 September – Victoria Darvai, folk singer (b. 1926)
- 25 September – Niculae Mircovici, officer and politician (b. 1950)
- 26 September – Ioan Gyuri Pascu, musician and actor (b. 1961)
- 27 September
  - Sebastian Papaiani, actor (b. 1936)
  - Aurelian Preda, folk singer (b. 1970)

=== October ===
- 4 October – Ion Ochinciuc, writer and playwright (b. 1927)
- 9 October – Marin Petrache Pechea, jazz singer and saxophonist (b. 1944)
- 19 October – Radu Câmpeanu, politician (b. 1922)
- 20 October – Valeriu Moisescu, theatre director and university professor (b. 1932)
- 21 October
  - Vasile Andru, writer, theoretician and essayist (b. 1942)
  - Constantin Frățilă, footballer (b. 1942)
- 25 October
  - Margit Bara, actress (b. 1928)
  - Dumitru Boabeș, politician (b. 1951)
- 27 October – Nicolae Coman, composer, teacher, poet, translator and musicologist (b. 1936)
- 30 October – Iustinian Chira, bishop (b. 1921)

=== December ===
- 8 December – Romulus Rusan, writer (b. 1935)

== See also ==
- List of Romanian films of 2016
- 2016 in the European Union
- 2016 in Europe
- Romania in the Eurovision Song Contest 2016
- Romania at the 2016 Summer Olympics
- Romania at the 2016 Summer Paralympics
- Romania at the 2016 Winter Youth Olympics
