= 1940 in Romania =

- Decades: 1920s; 1930s; 1940s; 1950s; 1960s
- See also: Other events of 1940; History of Romania; Timeline of Romanian history; Years in Romania

Events from the year 1940 in Romania.

== Incumbents ==
- King: Carol II (until September 6), then Michael I
- Prime Minister:
  - Gheorghe Tătărescu (until 4 July).
  - Ion Gigurtu (4 July – 5 September).
  - Ion Antonescu (starting 5 September).

== Events ==
- June 28–July 4 – Soviet occupation of Bessarabia and Northern Bukovina
- July 1 – Dorohoi pogrom
- September 7 – Treaty of Craiova
- September 8 – Nușfalău massacre
- September 9 – Treznea massacre
- September 13/14 – Ip massacre
- November 10 – 1940 Vrancea earthquake
- November 26 – Jilava Massacre

== Births ==
- January 6 – Doina Badea, singer of popular music (died 1977)
- January 7 – Florentina Mosora, biophysicist and film actress (died 1996)
- January 23 – Ileana Mălăncioiu, poet, essayist, and journalist
- February 9 – Simion Surdan, footballer (died 2006)
- February 24 – Nicolae Martinescu, Olympic wrestler (died 2013)
- February 26 – Alexandru Repan, actor
- March 12 – Virgil Nemoianu, essayist and literary critic
- May 3 – Marin Ferecatu, Olympic shooter
- May 17 – Valeriu Pantazi, poet, writer, and painter (died 2015)
- April 17 – Ștefan Gușă, general and Chief of the General Staff, 1986–1989 (died 1994)
- June 18 – Nadia Ileana Bogorin, First Lady of Romania, 1996–2000
- August 1 – Simion Popescu, Greco-Roman wrestler
- September 19 – Nicolae Bărbășescu, biathlete
- October 25 – Olimpia Cataramă, Olympic athlete
- November 1 – Alexandru Cecal, chemist (died 2021)
- November 19 – Cornel Oțelea, handball player
- December 24 – Constantin Oțet, football coach (died 1999)

== Deaths ==
- February 27: Nicolae Tonitza, painter (born 1886).
- July 21: Traian Bratu, academic and politician (born 1875).
- September 8: Constantin Banu, writer, journalist, and politician (born 1873).
- November 20: Ioan Moța, priest and journalist 1868).
- November 26 (killed in the Jilava Massacre):
  - Gheorghe Argeșanu, major general and politician (born 1883).
  - Ioan Bengliu, Inspector-General of the Romanian Gendarmerie (born 1881).
  - Victor Iamandi, politician (born 1891).
  - Gabriel Marinescu, brigadier general and politician (born 1886).
  - Mihail Moruzov, founder of the Romanian Secret Intelligence Service (born 1887).
  - Aristide Macoveanu, major
  - Iosif Dinulescu, major
- November 27:
  - Nicolae Iorga, historian and politician, Prime Minister in 1931–1932 (born 1871).
  - Virgil Madgearu, economist, sociologist, and politician (born 1887).
