= Luna Alcalay =

Austrian pianist, music educator and composer

- Born: 21 October 1928; Zagreb, Kingdom of Serbs, Croats and Slovenes
- Died: 9 October 2012 (aged 83); Vienna, Austria

Luna Alcalay (21 October 1928 – 9 October 2012) was a Croatian-born Austrian pianist, music educator and composer, described as "one of the most internationally renowned Austrian composers."

== Biography ==
Alcalay was born in Zagreb, Croatia, to a Jewish family. She studied piano under Bruno Seidlhofer and composition under Alfred Uhl at the Vienna Academy of Music and received a scholarship in 1958 to continue her studies in Rome. She attended the Darmstadt Summer Course.

After completing her studies, Alcalay returned to Vienna, where she became a professor of piano at the Academy of Music and Performing Arts. She died in 2012, at the age of 83, in Vienna.

== Composition prizes ==
- Darmstadt 1963 and 1964
- Gaudeamus Competition 1967
- Berlin 1972
- International ISCM competition Italy 1973
- ORF Steiermark 1973
- "Preis der Stadt Wien" 1992

== Works ==
Selected works include:

- Apostroph (violin solo)
- Apostrophen (violoncello solo)
- Gyroskop for viola solo (1998)
- un sogno à tre for flute, viola and harp (1990)
- relatif à la sonorité (string trio)
- Touches (two pianos)
- conversations à trois (woodwind trio)
- L'intérieur des pensées (string quartet)
- Applications (for sixteen strings)
- Pas de deux (two clarinets)
- Trio (alto saxophone, drums, double bass)
- Syntax (percussion)
- En circuit · Der alte Friedhof in Prag (mezzo-soprano and ensemble)
- Bagatellen (piano solo)
- Transparenzen(piano trio)
- Sentenzen (violin concerto)
- Quasi una Fantasia (violin and piano)
- Touches (piano concerto)
- Der übergangene Mensch (Music drama)
- A Game for Two (percussion (2 players))
- Due sentenze (mezzo-soprano, oboe d'amore, piano)
- 3 poems (marimba)
- En passant (flute solo)
- Ich bin in sehnsucht eingehüllt ("I'm wrapped in longing"), Scenic reflections on love poems by Selma Meerbaum (1984), written for Gunda König and Dieter Kaufmann's K&K Experimental Studio for their series of performances called "Music and Eroticism – Amor, Terror, Psyche"

Alcalay's work has been recorded and issued on CD, including:

- Der Tod des Trompeters/Heiligenlegende (Audio CD, December 1, 1995)
- Vienna Modern Masters VMM3020
