= 1938 in Romania =

- Decades: 1910s; 1920s; 1930s; 1940s; 1950s
- See also: Other events of 1938; History of Romania; Timeline of Romanian history; Years in Romania

Events from the year 1938 in Romania. A self-coup and subsequent new constitution make Carol II a royal dictator.

== Incumbents ==
- King: Carol II.
- Prime Minister:
  - Octavian Goga (until 10 February)
  - Miron Cristea (from 11 February)

== Events ==
- 10 February – Carol II stages a self-coup, deposes Octavian Goga as Prime Minister and cancels the elections planned for March in an attempt to create a royal authoritarian dictatorship.
- 24 February – A constitutional referendum is held, which by 4,289,581 votes to 5,843 grants Carol II the dictatorial powers he sought in his self-coup. Voting is open and compulsory, and there are allegations of coercion.
- 27 February – The 1938 constitution is ratified by Parliament, codifying the earlier coup and referendum.
- 30 March – The right-wing National Christian Party and Romanian Front are dissolved.
- 16 April – Corneliu Zelea Codreanu, the leader of the Iron Guard, along with other members of the party, is arrested. He is sentenced to ten years prison but shot while allegedly trying to escape on 30 November.
- 14 August – In a major reorganisation of the administrative division of the country, Carol II divides Romania into 10 Regions (Romanian: Ținuturi), which are named Argeș, Crișuri, Dunării, Jiu, Mării, Mureș, Nistru, Prut, Suceava and Timiș.
- 24 November – Carol II meets Chancellor of Germany, Adolf Hitler. An agreement is reached to provide Germany with food and oil.
- Date unknown – Letea Forest is declared the first nature reserve in Romania.

== Births ==
- 20 January –Maria Zaharescu, physical chemist.
- 3 October – Lia Vanea, volleyball player who competes in the 1964 Summer Olympics.
- 9 October – Olga Orbán, World Champion and Olympic medal winning foil fencer (died 2022).

== Deaths ==
- 12 February – Iosif Trifa, Romanian Orthodox priest and evangelist.
- 9 June – Ovid Densusianu, poet, linguist, folklorist, and full member of the Romanian Academy (born 1873).
- 18 July – Queen Marie of Romania, consort of Ferdinand I (born 1875).
- 16 August – Marcel Pauker, husband of Ana Pauker, Communist leader, executed near Moscow during the Great Purge (born 1896).
- 5 September – Gheorghe Mărdărescu, major general in World War I, commander during the Hungarian–Romanian War of 1919, and Minister of War from 1922 to 1926.
- 2 October – Alexandru Averescu, general in World War I, Marshal and Prime Minister of Romania (born 1858).
- 30 November – Corneliu Zelea Codreanu, Romanian politician and organization founder.
- 29 December – Eugenia de Reuss Ianculescu, teacher, writer, and women's rights activist (born 1866).
