= 1944 in Romania =

- Decades: 1920s; 1930s; 1940s; 1950s; 1960s
- See also: Other events of 1944; History of Romania; Timeline of Romanian history; Years in Romania

Events from the year 1944 in Romania. The year was dominated by the Second World War. The year started with the Soviet Army assault on Romanian troops and the Battle of Romania. King Michael led a coup d'état during the year and Romania left the Axis powers and joined the Allies. The Romanian army subsequently won victories against German and Hungarian troops.

== Incumbents ==
- King: Michael I.
- Prime Minister:
  - Ion Antonescu (until 23 August).
  - Constantin Sănătescu (23 August to 5 December).
  - Nicolae Rădescu (from 7 December).

== Events ==
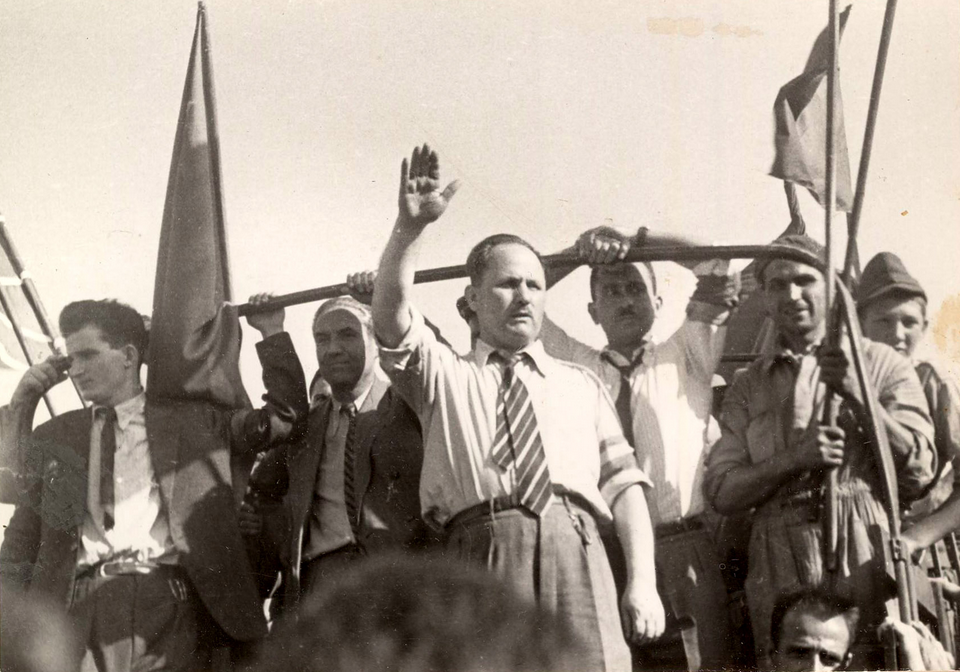
Nicolae Ceausescu, Constantin Agiu and others in Colentina, Bucharest, welcoming the Soviet Red Army on 30 August 1944

- 29 January – Romania surrenders the Transnistria Governorate to advancing Soviet troops.
- 5 March – The Uman–Botoșani offensive commences, which lasts until 17 April and ends with a Soviet victory against the Romanian and German Armies.
- 2 April – Soviet forces cross the Prut and entered Romania, initiating the Battle of Romania.
- 4 April – Aircraft of the Royal Air Force and United States Army Air Forces commence the first of what will be seventeen aerial bombardments of Bucharest, ultimately killing 5,524 inhabitants, injuring 3,373, and leaving 47,974 homeless.
- 8 April – The First Jassy–Kishinev offensive starts as Soviet troops advance on Târgu Frumos.
- 9 April – The First Battle of Târgu Frumos commences between Romanian and Soviet forces.
- 7 May – The Second Battle of Târgu Frumos closes with Romanian and German forces holding out against the advancing Soviet troops.
- 12 May – The minelayer Amiral Murgescu is the last Axis warship to leave Crimea, finishing the Crimean offensive.
- 23 August – King Michael and opposition allies launch a coup d'état, leading to Romania switching allegiance from the Axis to Allies.
- 25 August – Romania declares war on Germany.
- 31 August – The Romanian Army defeat the last German troops in Romania.
- 5 September – Romanian and Soviet forces attack the Hungarian soldiers supported by the German Army in the Battle of Turda. Fighting lasts until 5 October and, although the Allied forces are initially repulsed, the battle ends with the retreat of the remainder of the Axis soldiers.
- 12 September – Romania signs an armistice with the Allies.
- 25 October – Romanian and Soviet troops retake the last section of Northern Transylvania from Hungarian troops in the Battle of Carei.

== Births ==
- 11 February – Dumitru Velea, equestrian.
- 21 February – Lajos Sătmăreanu, football player and manager (died 2025).
- 26 May – Constantin Niculescu, boxer.
- 4 June – Ion Bașa, ice hockey player.
- 22 September – Ana Derșidan-Ene-Pascu, medal-winning fencer at the 1968 and 1972 Summer Olympics, and President of the Romanian Fencing Federation (died 2022).
- 28 October – Ileana Enculescu, volleyball player.

== Deaths ==
- 26 January – Smaranda Gheorghiu, poet, novelist, essayist, playwright, educator, feminist and traveler (born 1857).
- 9 March – Grigore Antipa, biologist (born 1867).
- 3 April – Octav Băncilă, realist painter and left-wing activist (born 1872).
- 4 August – Francisc Rainer, pathologist, physiologist, and anthropologist (born 1874).
- 11 August – Ion Minulescu, avant-garde poet, novelist, and short story writer (born 1881).
- 15 August – Ștefania Mărăcineanu, physicist (born 1882).
- 18 August – Alexandru Șerbănescu, fighter pilot and flying ace in World War II (born 1912).
- 13 September – Grigore Bălan, brigadier general during World War II, killed in action at the Battle of Turda (born 1896).
- 14 September – Paul-Mihu Sadoveanu, novelist and soldier, killed in action at the Battle of Turda (born 1920).
- 17 October – Eva Heyman, Romanian-born victim of the Holocaust (born 1931).
- 17 November – Magda Isanos, poet (born 1916).
- Date unknown – Alexandrina Cantacuzino, political activist, philanthropist and diplomat (born 1867).
