= Mălini =

- Commune
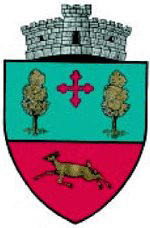
- Coat of arms

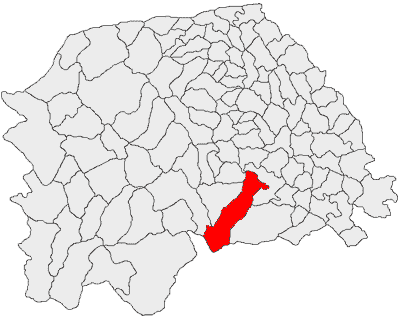
- Location in Suceava County

- Location in Romania
- Coordinates: 47°27′N 26°05′E
- Country: Romania
- County: Suceava

Government
  - Mayor (2020–2024): Petru Nistor (PNL)
- Area: 154 km^{2} (59 sq mi)
- Elevation: 421 m (1,381 ft)
- Population (2021-12-01): 6,689
  - Density: 43/km^{2} (110/sq mi)
- Time zone: EET/EEST (UTC+2/+3)
- Postal code: 727350
- Area code: +(40) 230
- Vehicle reg.: SV
- Website: www.comunamalini.ro

Mălini is a commune located in Suceava County, Romania. It is composed of five villages: Iesle, Mălini, Pâraie, Poiana Mărului, and Văleni-Stânișoara.

== Location ==
The commune is situated on the Suceava Plateau, at an altitude of 421 m (1,381 ft), on the banks of the Moldova River and its right tributary, the Suha Mare. Mălini is located in the southern part of Suceava County, 37 km (23 mi) southwest of the county seat, Suceava, on the border with Neamț County.

== Administration and local politics ==
=== Communal council ===
The commune's current local council has the following political composition, according to the results of the 2020 Romanian local elections:

Party	Seats	Current Council
National Liberal Party (PNL)	15	

== Natives ==
- Teodor Ilincăi (born 1983), opera tenor
- Nicolae Labiș (1935 – 1956), poet
- Epifanie Norocel (1932 – 2013), Romanian Orthodox metropolitan bishop
