= 1939 in Romania =

- Decades: 1910s; 1920s; 1930s; 1940s; 1950s
- See also: Other events of 1939; History of Romania; Timeline of Romanian history; Years in Romania

Events from the year 1939 in Romania. The year saw the assassination of Armand Călinescu.

== Incumbents ==
- King: Carol II.
- Prime Minister:
  - Miron Cristea (until 6 March).
  - Armand Călinescu (7 March – 21 September).
  - Gheorghe Argeșanu (21 September – 28 September).
  - Constantin Argetoianu (28 September – 23 November).
  - Gheorghe Tătărescu (after 25 November).

== Events ==
- 23 March – The German–Romanian Treaty for the Development of Economic Relations between the Two Countries is signed, which became effective on 20 January 1940 and was registered in the League of Nations Treaty Series on 17 January 1940.
- 1 June – With the National Renaissance Front the only party allowed to stand, In the general election, Armand Călinescu is elected prime minister.
- 22 June – The British ambassador in Bucharest notifies London that the Romanian government is allowing large numbers of illegal Jewish migrants to travel to Palestine.
- 6 July – Romania enters diplomatic relations with the Republic of China.
- 21 September – Prime Minister Armand Călinescu is assassinated by members of the Iron Guard.
- 8 October – Radio Basarabia starts broadcasting.

== Births ==
- 29 February – Irina Loghin, singer and politician.
- 15 April – Nicolae N. Săulescu, agronomist and member of the Romanian Academy.
- 29 April – Alexandrina Chezan, Olympic volleyball player.
- 9 June – Ileana Cotrubaș, opera singer (d. 2026)
- 8 August – Viorica Viscopoleanu, record-breaking long jumper.

== Deaths ==
- 8 January – Caton Theodorian, actor and playwright (born 1871).
- 12 January – Hariclea Darclée, operatic soprano (born 1860).
- 5 February – Gheorghe Țițeica, mathematician (born 1873).
- 3 March – Dimitrie Gerota, anatomist, physician, and corresponding member of the Romanian Academy (born 1867).
- 6 March – Miron Cristea, first Patriarch of the Romanian Orthodox Church (1925–1939), Prime Minister of Romania (1938–1939) (born 1868).
- 10 May – Adela Xenopol, feminist writer (born 1861).
- 15 June – Nicolae M. Condiescu, Romanian novelist and general (born 1880)
- 2 December – Ștefan Holban, general in World War I and Minister of War in 1921–1922 (born 1869).
- 18 December – Nicolae Drăganu, linguist, philologist, and literary historian (born 1884).
