= Suha Mare =

- Location within Romania

Location
- Country: Romania
- Counties: Suceava County
- Villages: Iesle, Văleni-Stânișoara, Poiana Mărului, Mălini

Physical characteristics
- Mouth: Moldova
  - location: Mălini
  - coordinates: 47.4645°N 26.1166°E
- Length: 29 km (18 mi)
- Basin size: 146 km^{2} (56 sq mi)

Basin features
- Progression: Moldova→ Siret→ Danube→ Black Sea

The Suha Mare is a right tributary of the river Moldova in Romania. It discharges into the Moldova near Mălini. Its length is 29 km (18 mi) and its basin size is 146 km^{2} (56 sq mi).
