= 1942 in Romania =

- Decades: 1920s; 1930s; 1940s; 1950s; 1960s
- See also: Other events of 1942; History of Romania; Timeline of Romanian history; Years in Romania

Events from the year 1942 in Romania. The year was dominated by the Second World War.

== Incumbents ==
- King: Michael I.
- Prime Minister: Ion Antonescu.

== Events ==
- 24 January – A record temperature of −38.5 °C (−37.3 °F) is recorded at Bod, Brașov.
- 6 June – A state of war is declared between Romania and the United States.
- 1 July – Romanian and German troops capture the fortress at Sevastopol following a siege that had lasted 8 months.
- 7 September – Romanian and German troops capture Novorossiysk in the Battle of the Caucasus.
- 2 November – Soldiers of the Vânători de munte under the command of general Ioan Dumitrache capture Nalchik, the farthest advance by the Axis powers into the Caucasus.
- 19 November – The Romania Third and Fourth Armies come under attack by the Soviet Red Army at the Battle of Stalingrad.
- 1 December – The Soviet cruiser Voroshilov and destroyer Soobrazitelny shell Snake Island, damaging the radio station, barracks and lighthouse on the island, but fail to inflict significant losses.

== Births ==
- 5 January – Alexandru Ioan Lupaș, mathematician (died 2007).
- 9 March – Ion Caramitru, stage and film actor, stage director, and political figure (died 2021).
- 25 March – Otilia Valeria Coman (pen name Ana Blandiana), poet.
- 25 March – Basarab Nicolescu, theoretical physicist.
- 27 March – Olga Bucătaru, film and stage actress (died 2020).
- 2 April – Gabriela Adameșteanu, novelist, short story writer, essayist, journalist, and translator.
- 23 May – Gabriel Liiceanu, philosopher.
- 28 May – Păun Otiman, agronomist, politician, member of the Romanian Academy.
- 22 September – Alexandru Moisuc, agricultural scientist.
- 4 November – Edward Luttwak, American military strategist and author.

== Deaths ==
- 21 March – Olha Kobylianska, modernist writer and feminist (born 1863).
- 21 November – Alexandru Pastia, colonel, killed in action at the Battle of Stalingrad (born 1893).
- 24 November – Ioan Sion, major general, killed in action at the Battle of Stalingrad (born 1890).
- 16 December – Selma Meerbaum-Eisinger, poet murdered in the Holocaust (born 1924).
