= 1943 in Romania =

- Decades: 1920s; 1930s; 1940s; 1950s; 1960s
- See also: Other events of 1943; History of Romania; Timeline of Romanian history; Years in Romania

Events from the year 1943 in Romania. The year was dominated by the Second World War.

== Incumbents ==
- King: Michael I.
- Prime Minister: Ion Antonescu.

== Events ==
- 11 January — Germany concludes a secret agreement to pay Romania thirty tons of gold and 43,000,000 Swiss francs in return for use of Romanian territory for German bases.
- 1 July — Foreign Minister Mihai Antonescu meets the Italian dictator Benito Mussolini in Rome and pleads with him to lead a bid by the countries aligned with Germany to leave the Axis. Mussolini refuses to commit to the plan.
- 1 August – The United States Army Air Forces unsuccessfully attempt to destroyer the refineries at Ploiești in Operation Tidal Wave, losing 53 bombers to Romanian defences.
- 2 October — The Tudor Vladimirescu Division is created by the Soviet Union from Romanian prisoners of war who were given the choice of "volunteering" to fight against Nazi Germany, or to remain incarcerated.
- 1 November – The Vânători de munte manage to hold Soviet troops in check during the Kerch–Eltigen operation in Crimea (until 11 December).
- 20 December – Repatriation of Jews that survived the Holocaust in Transnistria begins. By 30 March 1944, nearly 11,000 people, including orphans, had been repatriated.

== Births ==
- 24 March — Hilde Lauer, canoeist.
- 25 May – Cristina Doboșan, gymnast.
- 9 July – Margareta Pâslaru, singer and actress.
- 30 July – Dan Burghelea, mathematician.
- 2 August – Stere Gulea, film director and screenwriter.
- 5 August – Petru Ciarnău, wrestler.
- 13 September – Mircea Ciumara, politician and cabinet minister (died 2012).
- 4 October – Florian Pittiș, actor, theatre director, and folk music singer (died 2007).
- 24 October – Theodor Stolojan, politician, Prime Minister of Romania in 1991–1992.

== Deaths ==
- 8 February – Petre Gheorghe, communist and anti-fascist resistance member, executed for espionage and treason (born 1907).
- 16 July – Eugen Lovinescu, literary historian and critic (born 1881).
- 1 August – Horia Creangă, modernist architect (born 1892).
- c.8 August – Haig Acterian, film and theater director, critic, dramatist, poet, journalist, and fascist political activist, killed in action in World War II (born 1904).
- 27 August – Constantin Prezan, general in World War I, Marshal of Romania (born 1861).
- 25 September – Octav Botez, literary critic and historian (born 1884).
- 16 November – Petea Vâlcov, football player, died fighting against the Red Army in the Kalmyk Steppe (born 1910).
