= 2013 in Romania =

- Decades: 1990s; 2000s; 2010s; 2020s
- See also: Other events of 2013; History of Romania; Timeline of Romanian history; Years in Romania

The following lists events that happened during 2013 in Romania.

== Incumbents ==
- President: Traian Băsescu
- Prime Minister: Victor Ponta

== Events ==
=== January ===
- January 9: Four children are found carbonized after their house was destroyed in a fire in the commune of Măgura, Bacău County.
- January 11: Three people are caught in the act of trying to place a package containing an explosive device in Piatra Neamț.
- January 17: The Romanian Intelligence Service constitutes a crisis cell inasmuch as several Romanian citizens are taken hostage in Algeria.

=== February ===
- February 7: A diplomatic dispute between Romania and Hungary erupts as a Hungarian government official and the ambassador in Bucharest make commentaries on the flag of Székely Land that trigger much criticism from the Romanian side.
- February 24: Five people die and three others are seriously injured after a collision between a car and a minibus in the town of Călimănești, Vâlcea County. Among the injured was rapper Grasu XXL.

=== March ===
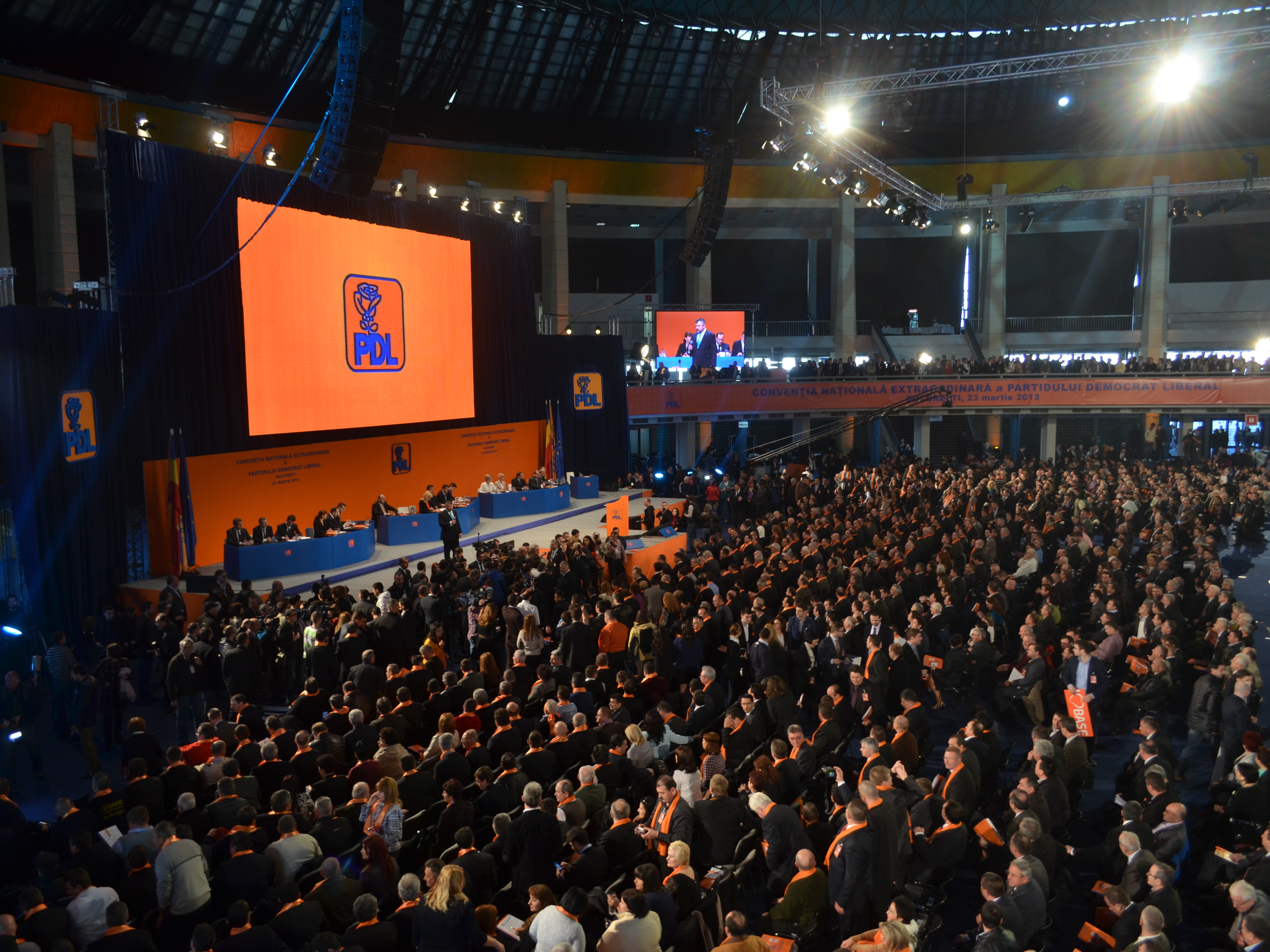
PDL convention, March 23

- March 7: Two people die and three others are seriously injured after a military helicopter crashes in Bacău County.
- March 10: More than 5,000 people attend a rally for the autonomy of Székely Land in Târgu Mureș.
- March 11: Three people from Bihor die and two others are in serious condition, after they get drunk with sanitary alcohol.
- March 16: Four people drown after their boat overturns on Lake Murighiol.
- March 18: Adrian Năstase is released from the Jilava Penitentiary. Former prime minister was sentenced on June 20, 2012 to two years imprisonment in the "Quality Trophy" case.
- March 22: Two men and a woman are found dead in their house in Constanța County, as a result of carbon monoxide poisoning.
- March 27: Mona Pivniceru resigns from the Ministry of Justice, following her appointment as a judge of the Constitutional Court for a term of nine years.

=== April ===
- April 4: Tens of thousands of people protest in more than 20 cities across the country against exploitation of shale gas through hydraulic fracturing method.
- April 10: About 2,000 pigs die in a fire at a farm located in the commune of Andrid, Satu Mare County, the prejudice being almost 1.5 million lei.
- April 18: 80 children get intoxicated at a school in Piatra Neamț, after they eat from a catering company.
- April 19: First Honorary Consulate of Lithuania in Romania is opened in Ploiești.

=== May ===
- May 3: About a hundred employees of a garment factory in Calafat are transported to the hospital, after they intoxicate with a substance used to disinfect the hall where they operate.
- May 20: Gigi Becali is sentenced by the supreme court to three years of imprisonment in land exchange with MND case, and former minister Victor Babiuc and former Chief of General Staff Dumitru Cioflină each receive two years in prison.
- May 23: A violent storm ravages Bucharest, leaving a woman dead, 17 people injured, 26 cars damaged and 140 trees smitten.

=== June ===
- June 14
  - Over 70 students and teachers at a school in Satu Mare are hospitalized with symptoms of food poisoning, after they attend the graduation banquet held at a restaurant in the city.
  - Two people die and 13 are injured in a collision between a car and a minibus in Păltiniș, Caraș-Severin County.
- June 15: Representatives from 24 county organizations of PRM attend a special meeting of the National Council, who decide to revoke the party president, Corneliu Vadim Tudor and PRM leadership. C. V. Tudor says the meeting is non-statutory and illegal.
- June 26: Prime Minister Victor Ponta decrees national mourning, after 18 Romanian citizens die in a bus crash in Montenegro.

=== July ===
- July 8: One person is slightly injured, after a homemade bomb explodes in a building of Alexandru Ioan Cuza University, Iași.

=== September ===
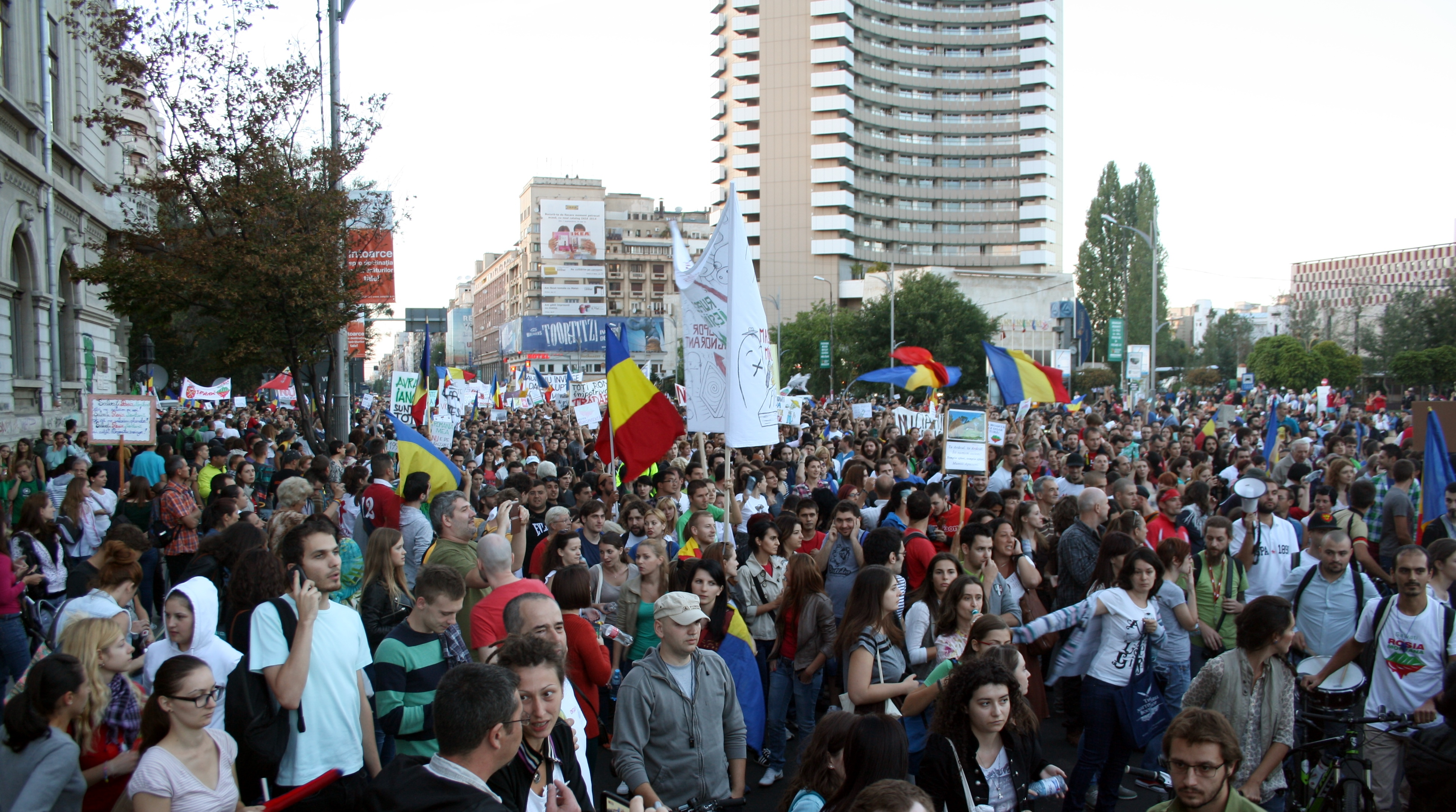
Tens of thousands of protesters marching in Bucharest against the Roșia Montană Project

- September 1: Hundreds of thousands of people protest in major Romanian cities against the Roșia Montană Project.
- September 8: Eleven people die when their minibus is hit by a passenger train at a level crossing near Iași.
- September 12
  - Flash floods in Galați County leave nine people dead and force thousands to evacuate.
  - Three people die and another 29 are injured after two coaches collide in Nădlac, Romania.

=== October ===
- October 6: An unusual earthquake swarm strike the Galați County, causing a lot of damage in the villages near the epicenter areas and panic among people.
- October 7: Varujan Vosganian announces his resignation as Minister of Economy, after the Senate votes against his criminal prosecution by the National Anticorruption Directorate.
- October 27: Nearly 150,000 Hungarians and Székelys form a human chain in Covasna County for the autonomy of the Székely Land.
- October 30: Scientists of Babeș-Bolyai University in Cluj-Napoca create a blood-like liquid that could be used in surgery or for transfusions in case of accidents.

=== November ===
- November 2: Nearly 7,000 doctors, nurses and dentists march on Victory Avenue, towards the Palace of the Parliament, demanding the allocation of 6% of GDP for health.
- November 6: More than 10,000 teachers protest in Victory Square, Bucharest, demanding the allocation of 6% of GDP for education.
- November 25: Up to 150,000 health professionals across the country trigger a two-hour warning strike.

=== December ===
- December 2: President Traian Băsescu sparks a new crisis by refusing to sign the country's IMF accord and threatens Prime Minister Victor Ponta's government with rejecting the national budget, blocking important indexations of salaries and pensions for the following year, over an ongoing political feud between the two leaders.

== Arts and entertainment ==
- February 16: "Child's Pose", directed by Călin Peter Netzer and starring Luminița Gheorghiu in the central role, won the Golden Bear for best picture at the Berlin film festival.
- March 25: "Toată lumea din familia noastră", directed by Radu Jude, won the award for best film at the seventh annual Gopo gala.
- April 11–April 20: The 22nd edition of StudentFest was held in Timișoara.
- June: The 12th edition of Transilvania International Film Festival was held in Cluj-Napoca.
- July 27–July 28: The fifth edition of the festival Rock the City took place at Romexpo in Bucharest.
- August 5–August 11: The eighth edition of the festival ARTmania took place in Sibiu.

== Sports ==
- February 17–February 22: The 11th edition of European Youth Olympic Winter Festival was held in Brașov.
- March 29: Gymnasts Larisa Iordache, Diana Bulimar and Adrian Muntean won three gold medals at the FIG World Challenge Cup in Doha.
- April 12: Răzvan Martin won a gold medal and a bronze medal in the 77 kg category final at the European Weightlifting Championships in Tirana.
- April 21: Romania won a gold medal and four silver medals at the European Artistic Gymnastics Championships in Moscow.

== Deaths ==
=== January ===
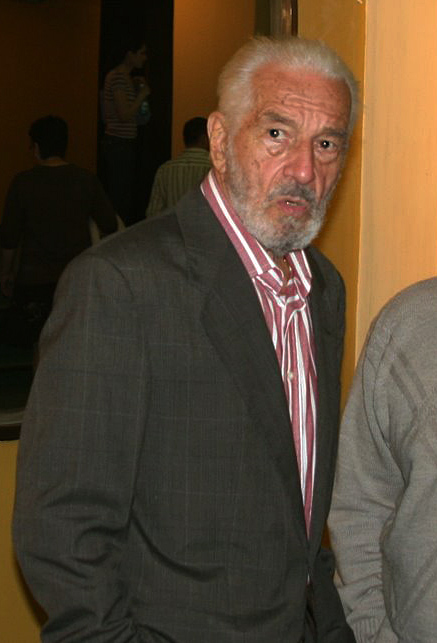
Sergiu Nicolaescu

- January 3: Sergiu Nicolaescu, 82, film director, actor and politician. (born 1930)
- January 7: Archbishop of Buzău and Vrancea Epifanie Norocel, 80. (born 1932)
- January 8: Cornel Pavlovici, 69, footballer (FC Steaua București), Liga I top scorer in 1964. (born 1943)
- January 17: Septimiu Roman, 56, SRR journalist. (born 1956)
- January 18: Victor Radovici, 76, theater actor and director. (born 1936)
- January 21: János Kőrössy, 87, pianist, arranger and composer. (born 1926)
- January 24: Dan Mihăescu, 79, humorist, scenarist and director. (born 1933)

=== February ===
- February 1: Ștefan Kostyal, 92, general. (born 1922)
- February 11
  - Mihail-Radu Solcan, 59, philosopher. (born 1953)
  - Zoe Țapu, 78, leading scientific researcher at the Research Institute for Cereals and Industrial Crops. (born 1934)
- February 12: Archimandrite Serafim Man, 77, abbot of the Rohia Monastery. (born 1935)
- February 16
  - Dumitru Sechelariu, 54, former Mayor of Bacău and owner of FCM Bacău. (born 1958)
  - Felicia Antip, 86, writer and publicist. (born 1927)
- February 23: Adrian Hrițcu, 87, Orthodox cleric. (born 1926)
- February 26: Naarghita, 74, Hindu music singer. (born 1939)

=== March ===
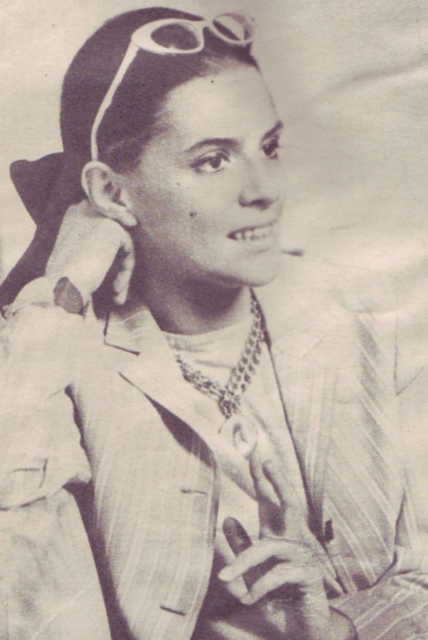
Irina Petrescu

- March 8: Dumitru Rucăreanu, 81, stage and screen actor. (born 1932)
- March 19: Irina Petrescu, 71, film actress. (born 1941)
- March 20: Vasile Ianul, 68, former president of FC Dinamo and Poli Iași. (born 1945)
- March 24: Mariana Drăgescu, 100, White Squadron aviator. (born 1912)
- March 26: Liviu Măruia, 35, archaeologist and geographer. (born 1977)
- March 29: Bujor Macrin, 70, theatre actor and director. (born 1942)

=== April ===
- April 1: Nicolae Martinescu, 73, Olympic wrestler. (born 1940)
- April 5: George Anania, 71, science fiction writer, playwright and translator. (born 1941)
- April 11: Alexandru Fronea, 79, footballer (FC Petrolul Ploiești). (born 1933)
- April 17: Paul Cristea, 72, physicist and member of the Romanian Academy. (born 1941)

=== May ===
- May 9: Cătălin Naum, 74, theater director and teacher. (born 1939)
- May 20: Gheorghe Buzatu, 73, PRM senator and historian. (born 1939)
- May 30: Radu Paladi, 86, composer, pianist and conductor. (born 1927)

=== June ===
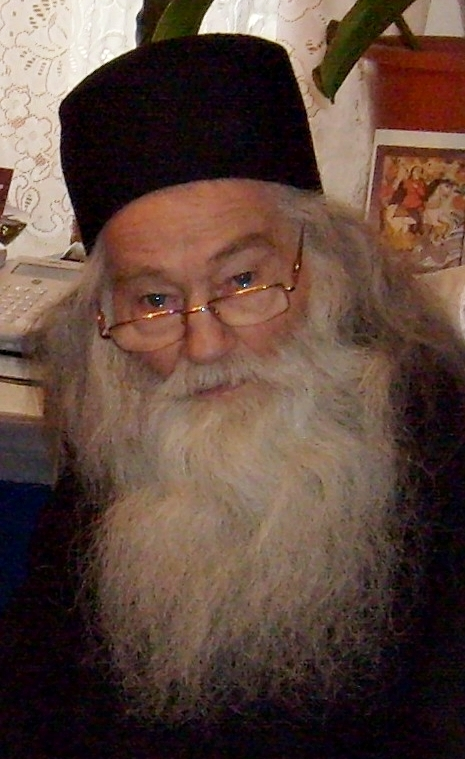
Iustin Pârvu

- June 8: Petrică Popa, 84, actor at the Nottara Theatre in Bucharest. (born 1929)
- June 10: Violeta Popescu, 72, actrice at the Vasile Alecsandri National Theatre in Iași. (born 1941)
- June 12: Tiberiu E. Nășcuțiu, 84, chemist and docent. (born 1929)
- June 16: Iustin Pârvu, 94, confessor and abbot of the Petru Vodă Monastery. (born 1919)
- June 19: Alexandru Mușina, 58, poet, essayist, journalist and editor. (born 1954)
- June 20: Mihail Popescu, 65, chief of General Staff of the Romanian Army. (born 1948)
- June 25: Octavian Moisin, 99, Greek-Catholic priest, chemical engineer, papal prelate and metropolitan canon. (born 1914)

=== July ===
- July 3: Radu Vasile, 70, politician, historian and poet. (born 1942)

=== August ===
- August 13: Octavian-Mircea Purceld, 65, leader of PRM Timiș and economist. (born 1948)
- August 17
  - Marius Cuteanu, 95, composer, conductor and teacher. (born 1917)
  - Cristian Grigorescu, 29, actor. (born 1984)
- August 18: Florin Cioabă, 58, self-proclaimed international king of the Gypsies. (born 1954)
- August 20: Costică Ștefănescu, 62, footballer (FC Universitatea Craiova) and trainer. (born 1951)

=== September ===
- September 6: Constantin Ghenescu, 69, actor. (born 1944)
- September 7: Petru Poantă, 66, literary critic and essayist. (born 1947)
- September 21: Roman Vlad, 93, composer, musicologist and pianist. (born 1919)
- September 23: Geo Saizescu, 80, director, screenwriter and actor. (born 1932)

=== October ===
- October 4: Rela Lucan, 45, folk singer. (born 1968)
- October 13: Angela Moldovan, 86, folk singer. (born 1927)
- October 30: Anca Petrescu, 64, chief architect of the Palace of the Parliament. (born 1949)

=== November ===
- November 7: Dana Comnea, 80, theater and film actress. (born 1933)
- November 9: Vasile Suciu, 71, footballer. (born 1942)

=== December ===
- December 18: Titus Munteanu, 72, TV producer. (born 1941)
- December 19: Nae Lăzărescu, 72, actor and comedian. (born 1941)

== See also ==
- 2013 BRD Năstase Țiriac Trophy
- 2013 BRD Timișoara Challenger
- List of 2013 box office number-one films in Romania
- 2013 in the European Union
- 2013 in Europe
- Romania in the Eurovision Song Contest 2013
