= March 1941 Romanian policy referendum =

5 March 1941

Results
Choice	Votes	%
Yes	2,960,298	99.90%
No	2,996	0.10%
Valid votes	2,963,294	100.00%
Invalid or blank votes	0	0.00%
Total votes	2,963,294	100.00%

A referendum on the policies of Ion Antonescu was held in Romania on 5 March 1941. Under pressure from Nazi Germany, King Carol II had appointed Antonescu as Conducător on 6 September 1940. Voting was done orally, with voters answering yes or no. Silence was taken to be a "yes". The referendum was approved by 99.9% of voters. A second referendum on Antonescu's policies was held in November.

== Results ==
Choice	Votes	%
For	2,960,298	99.90
Against	2,996	0.10
Total	2,963,294	100.00
Valid votes	2,963,294	100.00
Invalid/blank votes	0	0.00
Total votes	2,963,294	100.00
Source: Direct Democracy
