= Nicolae Labiș =

Romanian poet

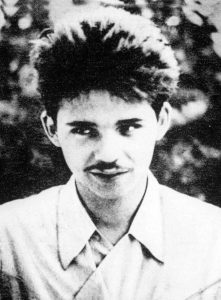
- Born: December 2, 1935; Poiana Mărului, Suceava County, Romania
- Died: December 22, 1956 (aged 21); Bucharest, Romania
- Occupation: Poet

Nicolae Labiș (Romanian pronunciation: [nikoˈla.e ˈlabiʃ]) (December 2, 1935 in Poiana Mărului, Suceava County, Romania – December 22, 1956 in Bucharest) was a Romanian poet.

== Early life ==
His father, Eugen, was the son of a forest brigade soldier who fought in World War II after having become a schoolteacher in 1931. His mother, Ana-Profira, the daughter of a peasant killed in the Battle of Mărășești, was also a schoolteacher. He had two sisters, Margareta and Dorina. He grew up surrounded by mountains and forests.

Labiș learned to read around age five from his mother's pupils. He also liked to draw as a child. He entered primary school in his native village (in his mother's class), then as a war refugee took third grade in Văcarea, Argeș, receiving top marks. His later classmates recalled that he would write poems and little plays and liked to declaim in public in this period. The family moved back to a village neighbouring his native one in May 1945.

From 1946 to 1951, Labiș attended the "Nicu Gane" High School in Fălticeni, graduating with an average of over 90%. He kept a journal and organised literary conferences and discussion circles. He was especially good in his Romanian classes, his compositions impressing fellow students and teachers. At 13 he appeared in The Taming of the Shrew on an improvised stage in his native village. In November 1949 he began writing a novel, Cărări spre victorie (Paths Toward Victory), on a school notebook, which was discovered three decades later. In November 1950 he was the youngest participant at a meeting of young Moldavian writers, being hailed as a "local wonder"; he recited a poem of his own there. That year he made his publication debut in Zori noi, a Suceava magazine. In May 1951 he received the top prize in Romanian at a nationwide olympiad held in Bucharest; the next month he made his Bucharest publication debut in Viața Românească. He began to attract the attention of leading authors, including Mihail Sadoveanu and Tudor Arghezi. In the next three years an extensive amount of his lyric poetry was published in magazines, but not in book form until after his death.

In January 1952, Labiș transferred to the "Mihail Sadoveanu" High School in Iași, where he led the school's literary discussion group. That summer, he stopped attending courses there, resuming them on an infrequent basis the next year and obtaining the maximum grade in Romanian on his graduating exam in Fălticeni in August 1954.

== Career ==
On September 15, 1952, Labiș entered the "Mihai Eminescu" Literature School in Bucharest. While there, he read voraciously, spending whatever he could spare on new and used books. He also edited the poetry section of the school magazine. Among his professors were Mihail Sadoveanu, Tudor Vianu and Camil Petrescu. Although he espoused the ideas of the ruling communist regime, singing its praises in a number of poems, during his two years at the school he became a leading opinion-maker and a star there, which, given his free spirit and incorruptible dignity, made activists of the Romanian Communist Party uncomfortable. In February 1953, his department held discussions about him for his alleged "deviations from the School's morality and discipline". In the spring of 1954, the Union of Working Youth (UTM) also held discussions about him and, with one vote against, decided to expel him from the organisation. However, the penalty was not upheld by higher organs. Around this time he frequently visited Sadoveanu. He recited a poem at his June 1954 graduation, and was hired by the literary magazine Contemporanul, and then by Gazeta literară. That autumn, he took courses at the University of Bucharest's Faculty of Philology, but dropped out after a semester. Also at that time, his most famous poem, "Moartea căprioarei" ("Death of a Doe"), appeared in Viața Românească.

In 1955–56, Labiș wrote his major lyric works. Many of them, though published in magazines, did not make it into his first published volume, Primele iubiri ("First Loves"), which came out after much delay in the autumn of 1956. (Shortly before that, he published a work for children, Puiul de cerb ("The Fawn"). Some remained in manuscript form, but eventually all were published after 1962. In March 1956, he gave a fine speech at a national conference of young writers, and that whole year was "uncannily productive": he continued writing and publishing poems besides those in Primele iubiri, drawing admiration and envy, and was actively preparing his next volume.

== Purge from the Communist Party ==
During his last months, Labiș felt that he was being followed by the Securitate. His UTM membership card was taken away several times, only being returned with Sadoveanu's intervention. Magazine editors, having received orders from higher up, refused to publish him, although his first volume had just come out. Negotiations for a contract on his second volume were dragging on indefinitely. In June 1956, in a speech stage-managed by propagandist-in-chief Leonte Răutu in an attempt to calm radical passions unleashed by Nikita Khrushchev's Secret Speech and the protests in Poland, the socialist realist poet Mihai Beniuc publicly criticised Labiș for the following poem:

Dacă cineva gigantic ar veni
Și mi-ar rosti: Eu îți dau viața toată
Neîncepută, necăpătată,
Dar să mi-o dai în seamă mie
S-o duc înspre visata zare purpurie
Pe drum neocolit, de netezime,
Pe drumul neștiut decât de mine...
Deci astfel de mi-ar spune
Eu aș simți că tot ce-mi spune-i putred
Cu hotărâre i-aș răspunde: Nu cred!
În fond, e și problema zilei de azi.

Translation:

If a giant someone came
And say "I will give you a whole new life
Not yet started, and never ending,
But you should let me guide it
So I can take it to the dreamt-of, purple horizon
On a straight and smooth path,
On a path known only to me..."
If he told me that
I'd feel all of that was just rubbish
And I'd wholeheartedly say "I don't think so!"
In fact, it is the problem of our present day, too.

Other poems of his, such as Legenda pasiunii defuncte ("The Legend of the Defunct Passion"), indicated disaffection with the existing Romanian socialist system, and called for a renewal of socialism in Romania along humanist lines.

== Death ==
On the night of December 9–10, 1956, shortly after his 21st birthday, Labiș, who had spent several hours with acquaintances drinking coffee and țuică at Casa Capșa and then the Victoria restaurant, was going to take a tram. He was headed to the house of Maria Polevoi, a dancer in the Army's troupe whom he had met that evening. It was after midnight and public transport had just started running that late. Ostensibly, he lost his balance, caught the grille between the wagons, his head hit the pavement, and he was dragged a short distance. An official investigation blamed inebriation as the cause of his fall, but the file was quickly classified. His spinal cord was fractured, his body was paralysed and he was practically decapitated. As the station was across the street from Colțea Hospital, in University Square, he was taken there immediately. At 2:30 am a surgeon wrote, "cranial and vertebral trauma; paraplegia". Toward daybreak, he was taken to the Emergency Hospital. There, he whispered a poem to his friend Aurel Covaci:

Pasărea cu clonț de rubin
S-a răzbunat, iat-o, s-a răzbunat.
Nu mai pot s-o mângâi.

M-a strivit,
Pasărea cu clonț de rubin,
Iar mâine
Puii păsării cu clonț de rubin,
Ciugulind prin țărână,
Vor găsi poate
Urmele poetului Nicolae Labiș
Care va rămâne o amintire frumoasă...

Translation:

The bird with the bill of ruby
Has avenged herself, look, has avenged herself.
I can caress her no more.

She has crushed me,
The bird with the bill of ruby,
And tomorrow
The chicks of the bird with the bill of ruby,
While pecking through dirt,
Shall perhaps find
Traces of poet Nicolae Labiș,
By then a beautiful memory...

Right after his accident, the literary historian Alexandru Oprea again proposed his removal from the UTM. Despite the doctors' efforts and an enormous spiritual mobilisation by his colleagues, acquaintances and friends, his condition worsened inexorably. On December 22, at 2 am, he died. Two days later, at noon, mourners gathered at the Writers' House, where several prominent writers spoke and his poem "Moartea căprioarei" was read. He was buried at Bellu Cemetery, after the funeral procession passed in front of Mihai Eminescu's grave.

Three theories regarding his death exist. The first is that it was accidental. His classmate Gheorghe Ioniță wrote, "Labiș did not pose any real threat to [the regime] at the time. On the contrary, it was in their interest to make him a court poet - after all, he was the most talented". The second is that it was suicide; in the 1980s, friends of his began to say that, as he felt the peak of his talent had passed, he did not wish to spend the rest of his life in mediocrity, so he decided to end it. The third is that it was a Securitate hit. The next morning, he himself told a friend, "After I fell on the tram tracks, I saw the wheel coming toward my head. Then something was pushing me from behind and again the wheel approached. This happened three times". Another friend observed, "He tried to board in front at the second-class seats, but someone shoved him and, at the last moment, he caught the grille in the middle, between the wagons: I held my eyes wide open".

Even if he was not assassinated, Labiș was certainly a thorn in the side of the regime. After the Romanian Revolution of 1989, Gheorghe Tomozei wrote, "Labiș is the first Romanian dissident poet.... He announced a fierce break between poetry and the ideology of the day. More than certainly, prison was not far off for him". The Securitate made note of his private conversations that "defamed the communist regime", and his poems too contained veiled anti-communist themes. The "inertia" in the title of his second volume may well have referred to the failure to de-Stalinize by Gheorghe Gheorghiu-Dej. He and his friends discussed the question of Bessarabia. On November 3, 1956, at a wedding attended by about a dozen people, he sang the Kingdom of Romania's anthem, "Trăiască Regele". That month, at Capșa, during an anti-Soviet discussion on the recent Hungarian Revolution, he stood up and loudly recited Eminescu's banned patriotic poem "Doina". He also participated in meetings during the Bucharest student movement of 1956, which was followed by vigorous repression. Given his rising popularity, a trial would have been inconvenient.

In 2006, the writer Imre Portik published his memoirs, in which he claimed that his friend Labiș told him he was pushed. He also wrote that in the days before the poet's death, he visited the dancer Maria Polevoi. According to Portik, she confessed that the poet was pushed, and that she even saw the man who did it, but refused to divulge further details. When Portik contacted her later, she refused to speak, saying that she had told all there was to tell to the prosecutor. Some have claimed that Polevoi was attached not to the army, but to the Interior Ministry, to which the Securitate also belonged. After the file was classified she refused to discuss the case with anyone else. She lived alone in the same house on Calea Călărași until her suicide in 1978.

== Published works ==
At the beginning of 1958, his second volume of poetry, Lupta cu inerția (The Fight against Inertia), which he had prepared before his death, was published. Between 1962 and 1985, twelve new editions of his poems appeared, with many new ones from his manuscripts. Studies, articles, and encomia all appeared in literary magazines through this period, for Labiș proved an enduring source of inspiration and guidance for the 1960s generation of Romanian poets, led by Nichita Stănescu.
