= Alexandrina Chezan =

Romanian volleyball player

Personal information
- Nationality: Romanian
- Born: 29 April 1939 (age 85); Bucharest, Romania

Sport
- Sport: Volleyball

Alexandrina Chezan (born 29 April 1939) is a Romanian volleyball player. She competed in the women's tournament at the 1964 Summer Olympics.
