= Teodor Ilincăi =

Romanian operatic tenor

Teodor Ilincăi (born 1983) is a Romanian operatic tenor, and poet.

His international debut took place in January 2009 at the Hamburg State Opera (MacDuff in Giuseppe Verdi's Macbeth). In March 2009, he made his debut at the Vienna State Opera (Ismaele in Verdi's Nabucco). His debut in Puccini’s La bohème in Timișoara, Bucharest, and Hannover followed. In December 2009, he made his debut at Royal Opera House in London with La Bohème, under John Copley’s stage direction.

In 2011 Ilincăi performed alongside Angela Gheorghiu in a concert in Valladolid, Spain.

He has worked with conductors including Gabriel Bebeșelea, Patrick Fournillier, Antonino Fogliani, Alexander Joel, David Giménez Carreras, Andris Nelsons, Evelino Pidò, Nayden Todorov and Sebastian Weigle.

== Prizes ==
- First place in the Tenor’s competition in Szczecin – Poland (2008)
- Soloist of the year offered by Bucharest VIP Gala Awards (2009)
- Ludovic Spiess prize, awarded by Romanian Music Forum (2009)
- In memoriam Iosif Sava distinction for his activity in 2009, offered by Radio România Cultural (2010)
- Second place at the "Francisco Viñas" international singing competition - Barcelona (2010)

== Repertoire ==
- Pinkerton – Madama Butterfly
- Lensky – Eugene Onegin
- Ismaele – Nabuco
- Faust – Faust
- Rodolfo – La bohème
- Romeo – Roméo et Juliette
- Alfredo – La traviata
- MacDuff – Macbeth
- Pollione - Norma
- Maurizio - Adriana Lecouvreur
- Mario Cavaradossi - Tosca
- Otello – Otello
- Calaf – Turandot
- Turiddu - Cavalleria rusticana
- Canio - Pagliacci
- Don Carlo - Don Carlo
- Don José - Carmen

== Discography ==
- Giacomo Puccini – La bohème (Royal Opera House 2010), DVD and Blu-ray
- Giacomo Puccini - Madama Butterfly (Hamburg Opera House), DVD and Blu-ray.
