= Măgura, Bacău =

Măgura
- Commune
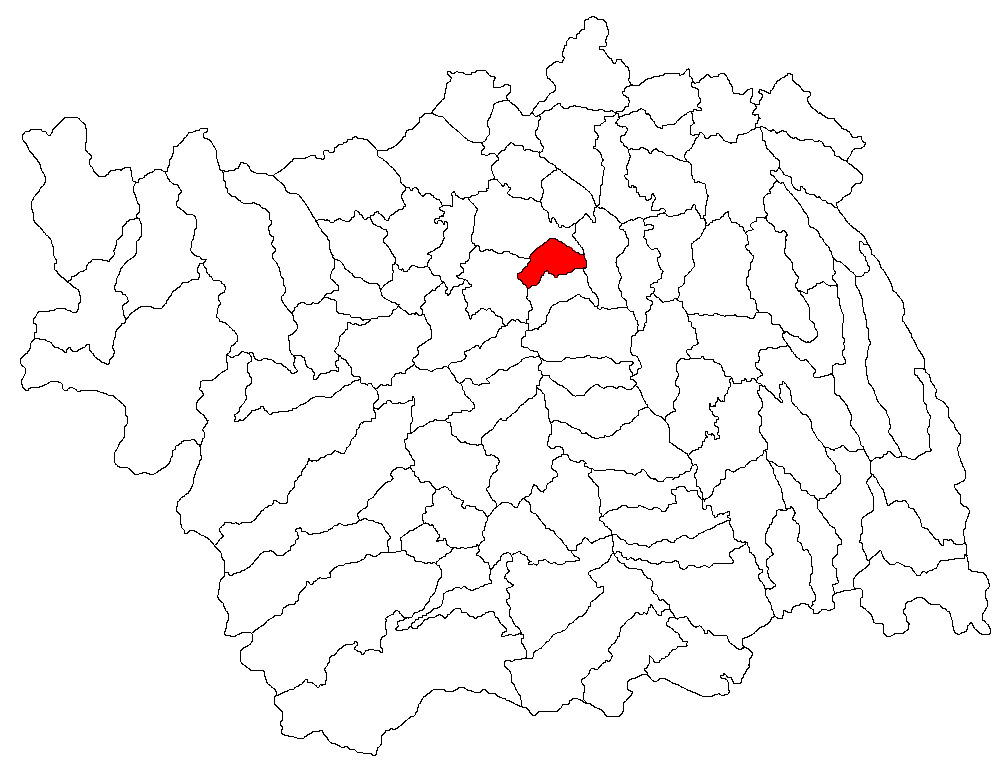
- Location in Bacău County

- Location in Romania
- Coordinates: 46°34′N 26°51′E
- Country: Romania
- County: Bacău

Government
  - Mayor (2024–2028): Iordache Costrăș (PNL)
- Area: 23.71 km^{2} (9.15 sq mi)
- Elevation: 201 m (659 ft)
- Population (2021-12-01): 5,647
  - Density: 238.2/km^{2} (616.9/sq mi)
- Time zone: UTC+02:00 (EET)
  - Summer (DST): UTC+03:00 (EEST)
- Postal code: 607305
- Area code: +(40) 0234
- Vehicle reg.: BC
- Website: primaria-magura.ro

Măgura is a commune in Bacău County, Western Moldavia, Romania. It is composed of four villages: Crihan, Dealu Mare, Măgura, and Sohodol.
