= Epifanie Norocel =

Epifanie Norocel (Romanian pronunciation: [epiˈfani.e noroˈt͡ʃel]; December 14, 1932 – January 7, 2013) was the Romanian Orthodox metropolitan bishop of Buzău and Vrancea, Romania. He was ordained a bishop in 1975.

He was born in Mălini, Suceava County, and died in Panciu, Vrancea County.
