= Lia Vanea =

Romanian volleyball player

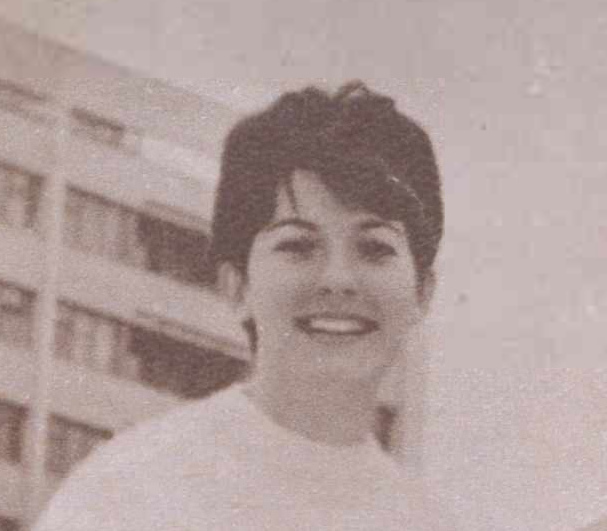
- Vanea in 1966

Personal information
- Nationality: Romanian
- Born: 3 October 1938 (age 87) Cluj-Napoca, Romania

Sport
- Sport: Volleyball

Lia Vanea (born 3 October 1938) is a Romanian volleyball player. She competed in the women's tournament at the 1964 Summer Olympics.
