= Ileana Enculescu =

Romanian volleyball player (born 1944)

Personal information
- Nationality: Romanian
- Born: 28 October 1944 (age 81) Craiova, Romania

Sport
- Sport: Volleyball

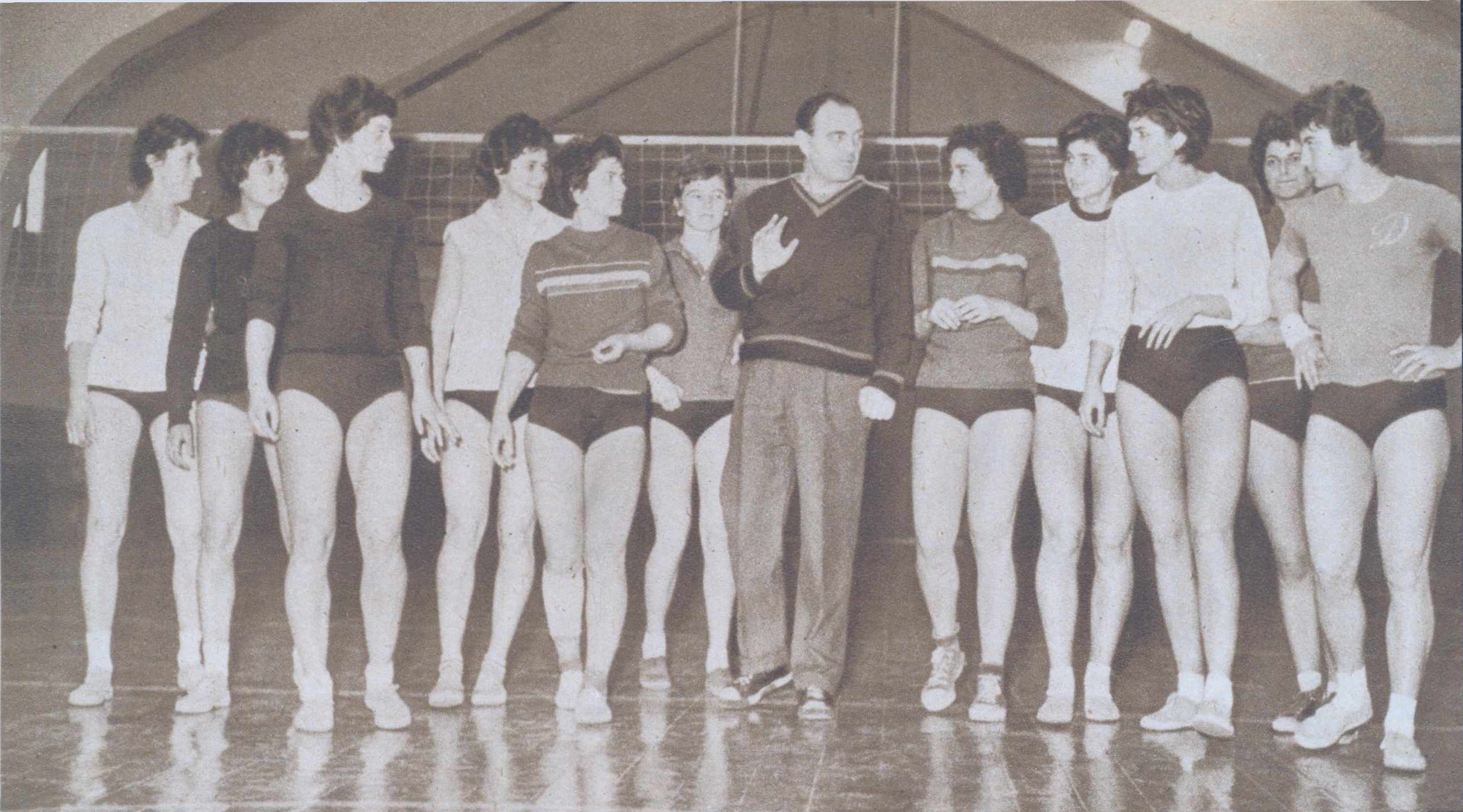
Training of the Bucharest players from the republican team. From left to right: Cornelia Moraru, Alexandrina Berezeanu, Doina Popescu, Marilena Ștefănescu, Sonia Colceriu, Elena Verdeș, coach Nicolae Murafa, Daniela Vernescu, Ileana Enculescu, Daniela Golimas, Alexandrina Chezan and Elisabeta Nodea.

Ileana Enculescu (born 28 October 1944) is a Romanian volleyball player. She competed in the women's tournament at the 1964 Summer Olympics.
