= Rudolf Fischer (historian) =

Romanian historian and linguist (1923–2016)

- Born: September 17, 1923; Brașov, Romania
- Died: February 18, 2016 (aged 92); Budapest, Hungary
- Resting place: Brașov, Romania
- Occupation(s): Historian, linguist
- Parent(s): Josef Fischer; Bertha Meldt
- Relatives: Moses Sofer (paternal ancestor)

Rudolph Fischer (September 17, 1923 – February 18, 2016) was a Romanian historian and linguist.
