= Bucovăț, Dolj =

Bucovăț
- Commune
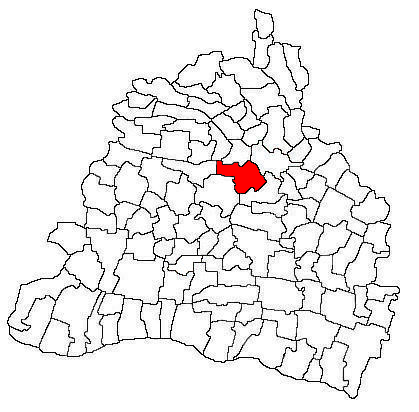
- Location in Dolj County

- Location in Romania
- Coordinates: 44°18′N 23°44′E
- Country: Romania
- County: Dolj
- Population (2021-12-01): 4,011
- Time zone: EET/EEST (UTC+2/+3)
- Vehicle reg.: DJ

Bucovăț is a commune in Dolj County, Oltenia, Romania with a population of 4,224 people. It is composed of seven villages: Bucovăț, Cârligei, Italieni, Leamna de Jos, Leamna de Sus, Palilula and Sărbătoarea.

Italieni village, founded by Italian settlers, was destroyed during the systematization process of the 1980s.
