= Naarghita =

Romanian singer (1939–2013)

Maria Armarghioalei known by the stage name Narghita or Naarghita (14 January 1939 – 26 February 2013) was a Romanian singer and stage performer who sang Indian film songs on tours across Europe in the 1960s and 1970s.

Armarghioalei was born in Pufești, Vrancea. After the separation of her parents when she was three, she was raised by her maternal grandmother. At nine years old, she moved to Bucharest and began to take dance lessons at the Palatul Pionierilor. In 1956, she joined the ballet group at the Constantin Tănase theatre while also taking singing lessons. At the theater she saw Awaara, a film by Raj Kapoor, which was very popular in Romania. She became obsessed with Indian music and began to learn Hindi. She began to sing, wear a sari and record her music under the stage name of Narghita. In 1967 her show was seen by the visiting Indian Prime Minister Indira Gandhi who invited her to India. She spent six months in India, meeting Raj Kapoor, among others. She gave radio shows, appeared on television and gave numerous performances touring across Europe. From the 1980s, she was banned from making foreign tours by Elena Ceaușescu. She then vanished into obscurity and died in anonymity and poverty in Bucharest.
