= Doina Florica Ignat =

Romanian politician

Member of the Senate of Romania
- In office 1992–1996

Personal details
- Born: 1938
- Died: 13 May 2016 (aged 77–78)
- Party: Romanian National Unity Party
- Occupation: Politician; historian

Doina Florica Ignat (1938 – 13 May 2016) was a Romanian politician. She was member of the Senate (1992–1996) for Bihor County, being named by the Romanian National Unity Party.
