= Florentina Mosora =

Romanian biophysicist

Florentina Ioana Mosora
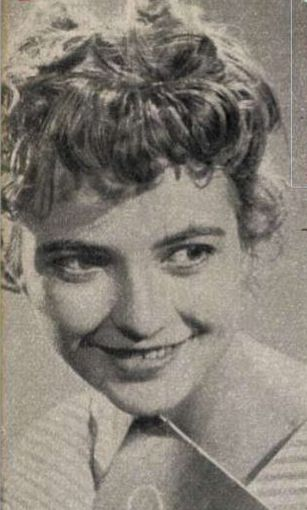
- Born: 7 January 1940; Cluj, Kingdom of Romania
- Died: 2 February 1996 (aged 56); Liège
- Citizenship: Belgian
- Education: University of Bucharest
- Scientific career
- Fields: Biophysics

Florentina Ioana Mosora or Florentina Stan-Mosora (7 January 1940 – 2 February 1996) was a Romanian and Belgian biophysicist. In her earlier years, before 1964, she was a film actress in the Romanian film industry.

== Biography ==
Mosora initially had a career in acting and was noted for her role in Dragoste la zero grade ("Love at Zero Degrees", 1964). She also starred in Sub cupola albastră ("Under the Blue Arch", 1962), Post-restant ("Poste Restante", 1961), and Băieţii noştri ("Our Boys", 1959). She was a graduate of the University of Bucharest's Faculty of Physics. Later she moved to Belgium, where she worked on the use of stable isotopes in medicine. She was awarded the 1979-1981 Prix Agathon de Potter for outstanding research work in physics by the Agathon de Potter Foundation and the Belgian Royal Academy. In 1989 she was one of three scientists co-organizing a NATO workshop on Biomechanical Transport Processes. She died aged 56 in Liège.

== Selected works ==
- Jandrain BJ, Pallikaris N, Normand S, Pirnay F, Lacroix M, Mosora F, Pachiaudi C, Gautier JF, Scheen AJ, Riou JP, and Lefebvre PJ, BJ; Pallikarakis, N; Normand, S; Pirnay, F; Lacroix, M; Mosora, F; Pachiaudi, C; Gautier, JF; et al. (1993). "Fructose utilization during exercise in men: rapid conversion of ingested fructose to circulating glucose". Journal of Applied Physiology. 74 (5): 2146–54. doi:10.1152/jappl.1993.74.5.2146. PMID 8335542.
- Baque, C.; Mosora, F.; Caro, C.G.; Krause, E.; et al., eds. (1990). Biomechanical Transport Processes: Proceedings of a NATO Advanced Research Workshop on Biomechanical Transport Processes, held October 9–13, 1989, in Cargèse, France. New York: Plenum Press. p. 426. ISBN 978-0-306-43676-5.
- Florentina Mosora, "Experimental Studies of Variations of the State," in Pullman, Bernard (1981). Intermolecular forces: proceedings of the Fourteenth Jerusalem Symposium on Quantum Chemistry and Biochemistry held in Jerusalem, Israel, April 13–16, 1981. D. Reidel. pp. 489–98. ISBN 978-90-277-1326-1.
- Mosora F; Lacroix M; Luyckx A (1981). "Glucose oxidation in relation to the size of the oral glucose loading dose". Metabolism. 30 (1): 143–49. doi:10.1016/0026-0495(81)90033-0. PMID 6796801.
- I. Ebiner JR, Acheson KJ, Doerner A, F. Mosora, JR; Acheson, KJ; Doerner, A; Maeder, E; Arnaud, MJ; Jéquier, E; Felber, JP (1979). "Comparison of carbohydrate utilization in man using indirect calorimetry and mass spectrometry after an oral load of 100 g naturally labelled 13-C glucose". British Journal of Nutrition. 41 (3): 419–29. doi:10.1079/BJN19790057. PMID 465433.
- Mosora F., Lefebvre P, Pirnay F, Lacroix M, Luyckx A, Duchesne, J., F; Lefebvre, P; Pirnay, F; Lacroix, M; Luyckx, A; Duchesne, J (1976). "Quantitative evaluation of the oxidation of an exogenous glucose load using naturally labelled 13C-glucose". Metabolism. 25 (12): 1575–82. doi:10.1016/0026-0495(76)90110-4. PMID 994839.
- Lefebvre P., Mosora F., Lacroix M, Luyckx A, Lopez-Habib 0, Duchesne, J., P.; Mosora, F.; Lacroix, M.; Luyckx, A.; Lopez-Habib, G.; Duchesne, J. (1975). "Naturally labeled 13-C glucose: metabolic studies in human diabetes and obesity". Diabetes. 24 (2): 185–89. doi:10.2337/diabetes.24.2.185. PMID 1123106.
- Lacroix M, Mosora F, Pontus M, Lefebvre P, Luyckz A, Lopez-Habib G; Mosora; Pontus; Lefebvre; Luyckx; Lopez-Habib (August 1973). "Glucose naturally labeled with carbon-13: use for metabolic studies in man". Science. 181 (4098): 445–6. Bibcode:1973Sci...181..445L. doi:10.1126/science.181.4098.445. PMID 4718109. S2CID 28672406.
