= Paul Dan Cristea =

Romanian professor of engineering

Paul Dan A. Cristea (13 February 1941, Bucharest – 17 April 2013) was a Romanian professor of engineering. He was named an IEEE EMBS Fellow in 2012 "for contributions to modernizing and internationalizing engineering education". He was fellow of the prestigious Academy of Scientists of Romania https://www.aosr.ro/

== Education and career ==
Cristea got his master's degrees from the Department of Electronics and Telecommunications of the Politehnica University of Bucharest and from the Department of Physics at the University of Bucharest in 1962. In 1970, he got his Ph.D. from the Polytechnic Institute of Bucharest, and, after graduation, remained at the university. Between 1962 and 1990, Cristea served as assistant, associate, professor, and full professor at his alma mater and was a founder of the Digital Signal Processing Laboratory at the Politehnica University of Bucharest. Since 2005, Cristea was an associate editor and member of the editorial board of the EURASIP Journal on Bioinformatics & Systems Biology.

In 2011 he became a full member of the Romanian Academy.

== Interviews ==
(in Romanian) https://www.youtube.com/watch?reload=9&v=2TipkP8Kbj4 ; https://www.youtube.com/watch?v=L5yfH1gT6_M
