= Plopu =

- Commune
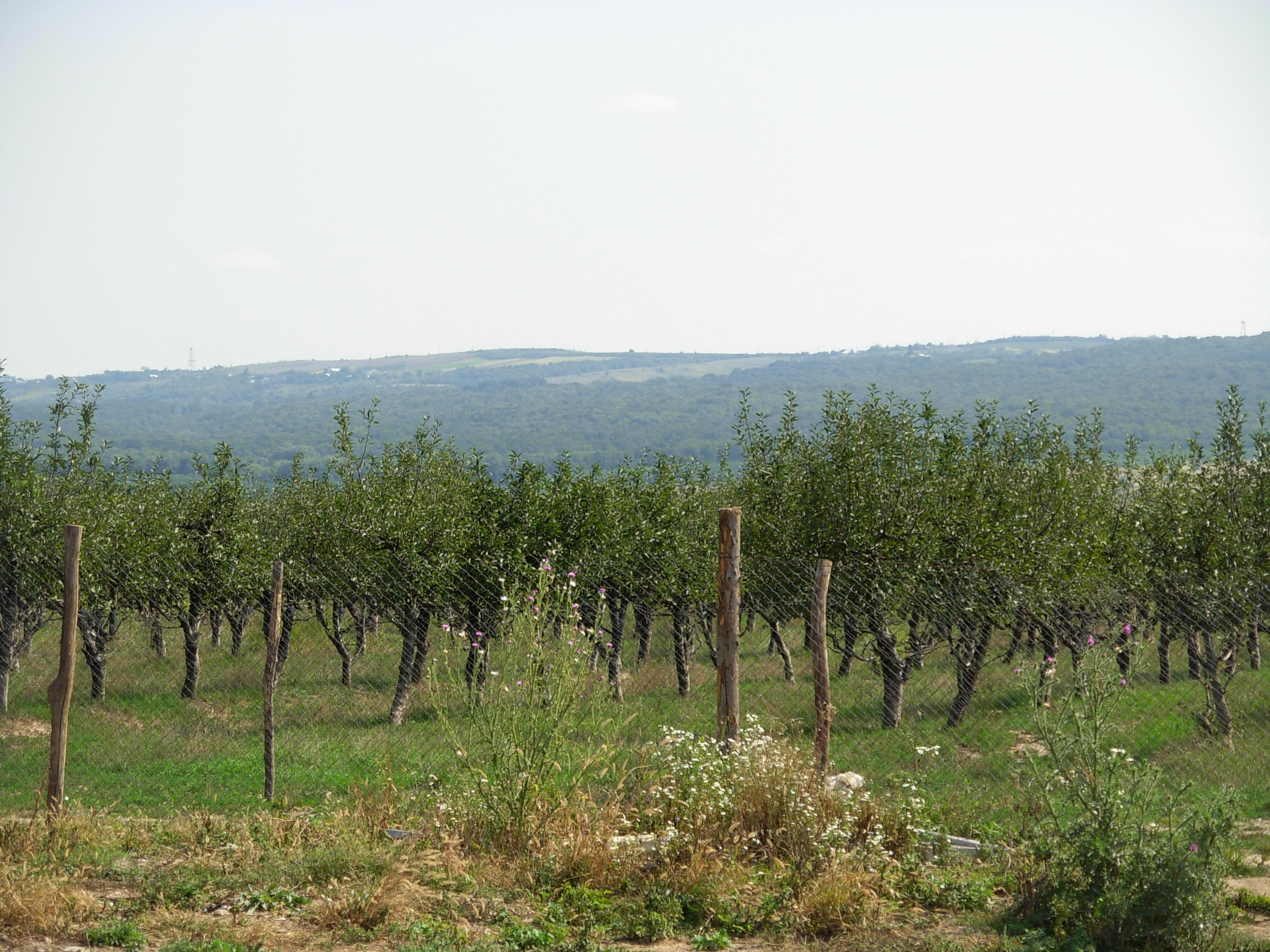
- Orchard between Plopu and Gâlmeia

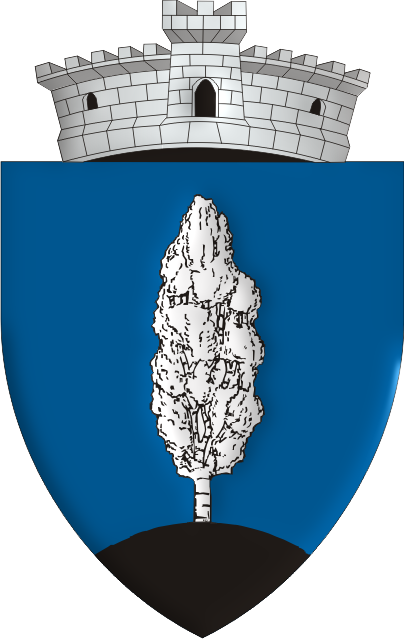
- Coat of arms

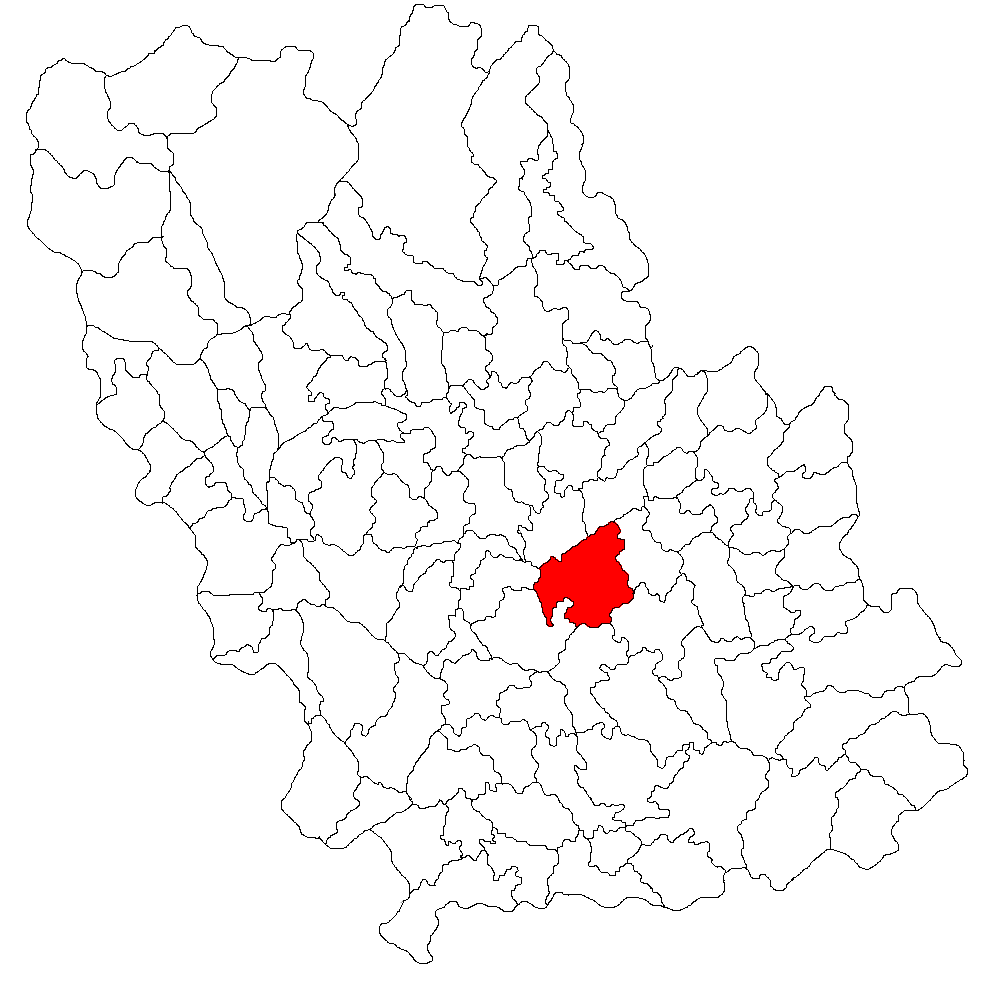
- Location in Prahova County

- Location in Romania
- Coordinates: 45°1′N 26°8′E
- Country: Romania
- County: Prahova

Government
  - Mayor (2024–2028): Adrian Bălănescu (PNL)
- Area: 45.37 km^{2} (17.52 sq mi)
- Elevation: 179 m (587 ft)
- Population (2021-12-01): 2,390
  - Density: 52.7/km^{2} (136/sq mi)
- Time zone: UTC+02:00 (EET)
  - Summer (DST): UTC+03:00 (EEST)
- Postal code: 107405
- Area code: +(40) 244
- Vehicle reg.: PH
- Website: primariaplopu.ro

Plopu is a commune in Prahova County, Muntenia, Romania. It is composed of four villages: Gâlmeia, Hârsa, Nisipoasa, and Plopu.

The commune is situated in the Wallachian Plain, at an altitude of 179 m (587 ft). It is located in the central part of Prahova County, 14 km (8.7 mi) northeast of the county seat, Ploiești.

Historical population
Year	Pop.	±%
1992	2,333	—
2002	2,344	+0.5%
2011	2,359	+0.6%
2021	2,390	+1.3%
Source: Census data
