= Selma Meerbaum-Eisinger =

Romanian poet

- Born: February 5, 1924; Cernăuţi, Kingdom of Romania
- Died: December 16, 1942 (aged 18); Mykhailivka, Kingdom of Romania
- Occupation: Poet

Selma Meerbaum-Eisinger (February 5, 1924 – December 16, 1942) was a Romanian-born German-language poet. A Jew, she died during the Holocaust at the age of 18 in a labor camp in Ukraine.

Meerbaum-Eisinger of her father, the shopkeeper Max Meerbaum in Cernăuţi (Czernowitz), a town in the Northern Bukovina region of the Romanian Kingdom (now Chernivtsi, Ukraine). Eisinger was the surname of her stepfather. At an early age she began to study literature. Her work shows a heavy influence from those she studied: Heinrich Heine, Rainer Maria Rilke, [[Klabund]Tagore]]. In 1939 she began to write poetry, and was already a skilled translator, being able to translate between French, Romanian, Yiddish and her native German. After German troops invaded in July 1941, and the region where she lived was ceded to the Soviet Union in 1940, the family was forced to relocate to the city's ghetto. In 1942 the family was deported to the Mikhailovka labor camp in Transnistria, where Selma soon died of typhus.

Meerbaum-Eisinger's work comprises 57 poems, which were written in pencil and hand-bound into a volume named Blütenlese (English: Blossom Vintage/The Reaping of Blossoms). Fifty-two poems were her own and the rest were translations from French (Paul Verlaine), Yiddish (Itzik Manger, H. Leivick), and Romanian (Discipol Mihnea). The volume was dedicated to her love and best friend, Lejser Fichman, a year her senior. It was planned that Fichman would give the book of poems to another friend of Meerbaum-Eisinger's, who would have the book published upon its arrival in Mandatory Palestine. However, Fichman died en route and was unable to transmit the book. Her poems were rediscovered and published by Tel Aviv University in 1979, edited by Adolf Rauchwerger. In 1980 they were then published in Germany, through the efforts of journalist and researcher Jürgen Serke. The lost volume was published in its entirety under the title Ich bin in Sehnsucht eingehüllt (English: I am engulfed in longing). An audiobook of the poems was produced in November 2005.

== Style and critical reception ==
The poems left by Meerbaum-Eisinger are written in a strikingly confident and lyrical impressionist style, with a generally melancholy mood throughout. Literary critics count her among the ranks of world-class poets, and fellow poet Hilde Domin said that her poems were "clear, beautiful, light, yet conveyed a sense of foreboding." Her poems, with the poems of Rose Ausländer and Paul Celan, are considered to make up an important part of the German-Jewish culture of Bukovina.

== Bibliography ==
- Selma Meerbaum-Eisinger (1979), Blütenlese (in German), Tel Aviv
- Selma Meerbaum-Eisinger (2008), Ich bin in Sehnsucht eingehüllt: Gedichte (in German), Hamburg: Hoffmann und Campe, ISBN 978-3-455-40121-9
- Ortrun Niethammer: Innere Differenzierung. Selma Meerbaum-Eisinger: Rezeption ihrer Gedichte nach 1980. In Inge Hansen-Schaberg (ed.): Als Kind verfolgt. Anne Frank und die anderen. Berlin 2004, ISBN 3-89693-244-6. (in German)
- Mariana-Virginia Lăzărescu: „Schau, das Leben ist so bunt“. Selma Meerbaum-Eisinger, Karin Gündisch und Carmen Elisabeth Puchianu: drei repräsentative deutsch schreibende Autorinnen aus Rumänien. WVB, Berlin 2009, ISBN 978-3-86573-445-7. (in German)
- Francesca Paolino: Una vita. Selma Meerbaum-Eisinger (1924-1942), Edizioni del Faro, Trento 2013, ISBN 978-88-6537-139-8. (in Italian)
- Selma Meerbaum-Eisinger, Florilegio, Edizioni Forme Libere, Trento, 2015, ISBN 978-88-6459-060-8. (in Italian)
