= November 1941 Romanian policy referendum =

15 November 1941

Results
Choice	Votes	%
Yes	3,446,853	100.00%
No	68	0.00%

A referendum on the policies of Ion Antonescu was held in Romania on 15 November 1941. The referendum, the second that year on Antonescu's policies, were held after the extension of working hours on 2 October had been met with riots. The vote was carried out orally, with a silence taken as a "yes" vote, and was approved with 99.998% in favour and only 68 people voting against.

== Results ==
Choice	Votes	%
For	3,446,889	100.00
Against	68	0.00
Total	3,446,957	100.00
Source: Direct Democracy
