= Constantin Mihail =

Romanian track and field coach

Constantin "Titi" Mihail
- Born: Constantin Gheorghe Mihail; July 24, 1945; Constanța, Romania
- Died: January 22, 2016 (aged 70); Mangalia, Romania
- Occupations: Track and field coach
- Awards: Order of Faithful Service; Order of Sport Merit

Constantin "Titi" Gheorghe Mihail (July 24, 1945 – January 22, 2016) was a Romanian track and field coach. He is considered one of the most important promoters of male sprinting, hurdling, long jump, and triple jump events. Mihail had a significant role in restructuring the Romanian Athletics Federation in the post-communist period.
