= Miron Chichișan =

Romanian politician (1945-2016)

Mayor of Zalău
- In office 1992–1996
- Preceded by: Ioan Mureșan
- Succeeded by: Petru Durcău

Member of the Chamber of Deputies of Romania
- In office 1996–2000

Personal details
- Born: April 25, 1945
- Died: January 31, 2016 (aged 70)
- Party: Social Democrat Party (Romania)
- Education: Technical University of Cluj-Napoca

Miron Chichișan (April 25, 1945 – January 31, 2016) was a Romanian politician. He served as the Mayor of Zalău and as a member of the Chamber of Deputies of Romania.
