= List of hoards in Romania =

This is a list of hoards in Romania which comprises the significant archaeological hoards of coins, jewellery, metal objects, scrap metal and other valuable items that have been discovered in the territory of present-day Romania.

== Neolithic hoards ==
Hoard	Image	Date	Place of discovery	Year of discovery	Current Location	Contents
Moigrad Treasure	Anthropomorphic idol	4000–3000 BC	Moigrad, Sălaj	1912	National Museum of Romanian History, Bucharest	Anthropomorphic idols, bracelets

== Bronze Age hoards ==
Hoard	Image	Date	Place of discovery	Year of discovery	Current Location	Contents
Perșinari Treasure	Dagger	17th century BC	Perșinari, Dâmbovița	1954; 1962	National Museum of Romanian History, Bucharest	13 Mycenaean gold (electrum) short swords/daggers (total weight 3.5 kg); silver axes
Galeșu Treasure	Anthropomorphic idol	1400–1200 BC	Galeșu, Constanța	1951	National Museum of Romanian History, Bucharest	2 gold diadems
Hinova Treasure	Hinova treasure	12th century BC	Hinova, Mehedinți		National Museum of Romanian History, Bucharest	gold bracelets, various fragments

== Dacian hoards ==
Hoard	Image	Date	Place of discovery	Year of discovery	Current Location	Contents
Helmet of Cucuteni-Băiceni	Helmet from the Cucuteni treasure	5th century BC	Cucuteni, Iași	1959	National Museum of Romanian History, Bucharest	gold helmet, 70 pieces of gold weighing 2.063 kg
Helmet of Agighiol	Silver helmet from the Agighiol hoard	5th century	Agighiol, Tulcea		National Museum of Romanian History, Bucharest	a silver helmet (743 grams), 2 silver greaves (902 and 744 grams), 2 silver bowls, 5 silver phiales, 9 silver appliqués, 3 silver appliqués, 1 necklace
Helmet of Peretu	Silver helmet of Peretu	5th century BC	Peretu, Teleorman		National Museum of Romanian History, Bucharest	silver helmet (759 grams), other silver artifacts
Stâncești Treasure	Mythological figure	5th century BC	Stâncești, Botoșani		National Museum of Romanian History, Bucharest	gold Scythian-inspired mythological being (47.8 cm x 9.7 cm, 100 grams)
Helmet of Coțofenești	Gold helmet of Coţofeneşti	4th century BC	Coțofenești, Prahova	1929	National Museum of Romanian History, Bucharest	gold helmet (746 grams), silver beakers; it was stolen during an exhibition at the Drents Museum in Assen, Netherlands
Helmet of Iron Gates or the Detroit Helmet	Silver helmet of Iron Gates	4th century BC	Iron Gates, Mehedinți		Detroit Institute of Arts, United States	gold helmet, silver beakers
Craiova Treasure	Appliqué	4th century BC	unknown		National Museum of Romanian History, Bucharest	silver appliqués, buttons; thought to be connected with the Detroit Helmet and the rhyton at the Metropolitan Museum
Rhyton of Poroina	Silver and gold rython	3rd century BC	Poroina Mare, Mehedinți		National Museum of Romanian History, Bucharest	silver rhyton, partially gilded (278 grams)
Bunești-Averești Treasure	Gold Hellenic diadem from Bunești-Averești	3rd century BC	Bunești-Averești, Vaslui		National Museum of Romanian History, Bucharest	
Herăstrău Hoard	Silver fibula found in Herăstrău	1st century BC	Herăstrău, Bucharest	1938	National Museum of Romanian History, Bucharest	silver coins, silver spiral bracelets, silver bowl
Surcea Hoard	Falera	1st century BC	Surcea, Covasna		National Museum of Romanian History, Bucharest	2 phalerae
Rociu Hoard	Silver bracelet		Rociu, Argeș		National Museum of Romanian History, Bucharest	Silver bracelet
Vârteju Hoard			Vârteju, Ilfov		National Museum of Romanian History, Bucharest	299 silver coins
Sâncrăieni Treasure	Silver cup	1st century BC – 1st century AD	Sâncrăieni, Harghita	1953	National Museum of Romanian History, Bucharest	13 silver drinking cups, 2 conical vases, 2 silver bracelets, 1 fibula
Dacian bracelets	Gold bracelets	1st century BC – 1st century AD	Sarmizegetusa Regia, Hunedoara	c.2000	National Museum of Romanian History, Bucharest	24 gold bracelets, of which 12 have been recovered by the National Museum
Coada Malului Treasure	Fibula from the Coada Malului treasure	100-50 BC	Coada Malului, Prahova		National Museum of Romanian History, Bucharest	fibulae, bracelets
Lupu Hoard	Dacian coins from Lupu	1st century AD	Lupu, Alba	1978	National Museum of the Union, Alba Iulia	a bronze pot containing 2 silver fibulae, 7 silver phalerae, 1 semispherical cup, a Roman bronze mug

== Roman hoards ==
Hoard	Image	Date	Place of discovery	Year of discovery	Current Location	Contents
Cislău Hoard	Gold medal of Constantius II, 347-355 AD	2nd century	Bărăști, Buzău	1987	Kunsthistorisches Museum, Vienna; Hungarian National Museum, Budapest	244 silver denarii
Treasure of Șimleu Silvaniei	Gepid gold necklace with 52 pendant amulets, in the Kunsthistorisches Museum, Vienna	300-400 AD	Șimleu Silvaniei, Sălaj	1797, 1889	Kunsthistorisches Museum, Vienna; Hungarian National Museum, Budapest	1st: 17 gold medallions, a gold chain with 52 pendant amulets, 24 gold foil rings, a disk-shaped pendant, a ring, the fragment of a bracelet, and a pendant in the shape of a human figure. 2nd: an onyx fibula, ten pairs of fibulae decorated with gold and jewels, a swearing-in ring and three gold bowls.

== Gothic hoards ==
Hoard	Image	Date	Place of discovery	Year of discovery	Current Location	Contents
Pietroasele Treasure	Gold Patera from the Pietroasele Treasure	250-400 AD	Pietroasele, Buzău	1837	National Museum of Romanian History, Bucharest	a large gold eagle-headed fibula and three smaller ones, a patera, a twelve-sided cup, a ring, a large tray, two other necklaces and a pitcher
Apahida hoard	Silver pitcher	4th century AD	Apahida, Cluj		National Museum of Romanian History, Bucharest	a silver pitcher, diademas, fibulae, bracelets

== Medieval hoards ==
Hoard	Image	Date	Place of discovery	Year of discovery	Current Location	Contents
Rotopănești Hoard		6th century	Rotopănești, Suceava			a Hunnic gold pendant (16.8 grams) with ruby-coloured almandines
Treasure of Nagyszentmiklós	Bull's head bowl from the Treasure of Nagyszentmiklós	500-900 AD	Sânnicolau Mare, Timiș	1799	Kunsthistorisches Museum, Vienna	23 gold objects totaling 9.945 kg
Coșoveni hoard	Silver helmet of Peretu	5th-6th century AD	Coșoveni, Dolj		National Museum of Romanian History, Bucharest	
Dinogetia hoard	Gold crucifix of Dinogetia	11th century AD	Dinogetia, Galați		National Museum of Romanian History, Bucharest	Byzantine crucifix, coins
Târgoviște hoard		15th century	Târgoviște, Dâmbovița			6284 silver coins
Dolj hoard		16th century	Dolj	2013	Muzeului Olteniei, Craiova	1471 silver coins
Șopteriu hoard		17th century	Șopteriu, Bistrița-Năsăud	1987	Muzeul Județean Bistrița-Năsăud, Bistrița	3 kg of silver coins, objects of gilded silver, jewelry, a silver scabbard
Râșnov hoard		17th century	Râșnov, Brașov	2001		416 silver coins

== Modern era hoards ==
Hoard	Image	Date	Place of discovery	Year of discovery	Current Location	Contents
Desa hoard		c. 1870?	Desa, Dolj	2011	Muzeul Olteniei, Craiova	75 gold coins minted between 1848 and 1868
