= Romania in Antiquity =

Historical period of Romania

The Antiquity in Romania spans the period between the foundation of Greek colonies in present-day Dobruja and the withdrawal of the Romans from "Dacia Trajana" province. The earliest records of the history of the regions which now form Romania were made after the establishment of three Greek towns—Histria, Tomis, and Callatis—on the Black Sea coast in the 7th and 6th centuries BC. They developed into important centers of commerce and had a close relationship with the natives. The latter were first described by Herodotus, who made mention of the Getae of the Lower Danube region, the Agathyrsi of Transylvania and the Sygannae of Crişana.

Archaeological research prove that Celts dominated Transylvania between the middle of the 5th century and the end of the 3rd century BC. The Bastarnae—a warlike Germanic tribe—settled in the regions to the east of the Carpathian Mountains around 200 BC. Confrontations between the natives and the Roman Empire began in the late 1st century BC. Among the former, the Dacians—who were closely connected to the Getae—rose to eminence under King Burebista (c. 80–44 BC). He unified the tribes dwelling between the Middle Danube, the Northern Carpathians, the Dniester and the Balkan Mountains into a powerful, but ephemeral empire. It disintegrated into at least four parts after his death. Large territories to the north of the Lower Danube—the lands between the Tisa, the Northern Carpathians, the Dniester and the Lower Danube—were again unified for less than two decades by King Decebalus of the Dacians (87–106 AD).

Modern Dobruja—the territory between the Lower Danube and the Black Sea—was the first historical region of Romania to have been incorporated in the Roman Empire. The region was attached to the Roman province of Moesia between 46 and 79 AD. The Romans also occupied Banat, Oltenia and Transylvania after the fall of Decebalus and the disintegration of his kingdom in 106. The three regions together formed the new province of Dacia. The new province was surrounded by "barbarian" tribes, including the Costoboci, the Iazyges and the Roxolani. New Germanic tribes—the Buri and the Vandals—arrived and settled in the vicinity of Dacia province in the course of the Marcomannic Wars in the second half of the 2nd century.

== Background ==
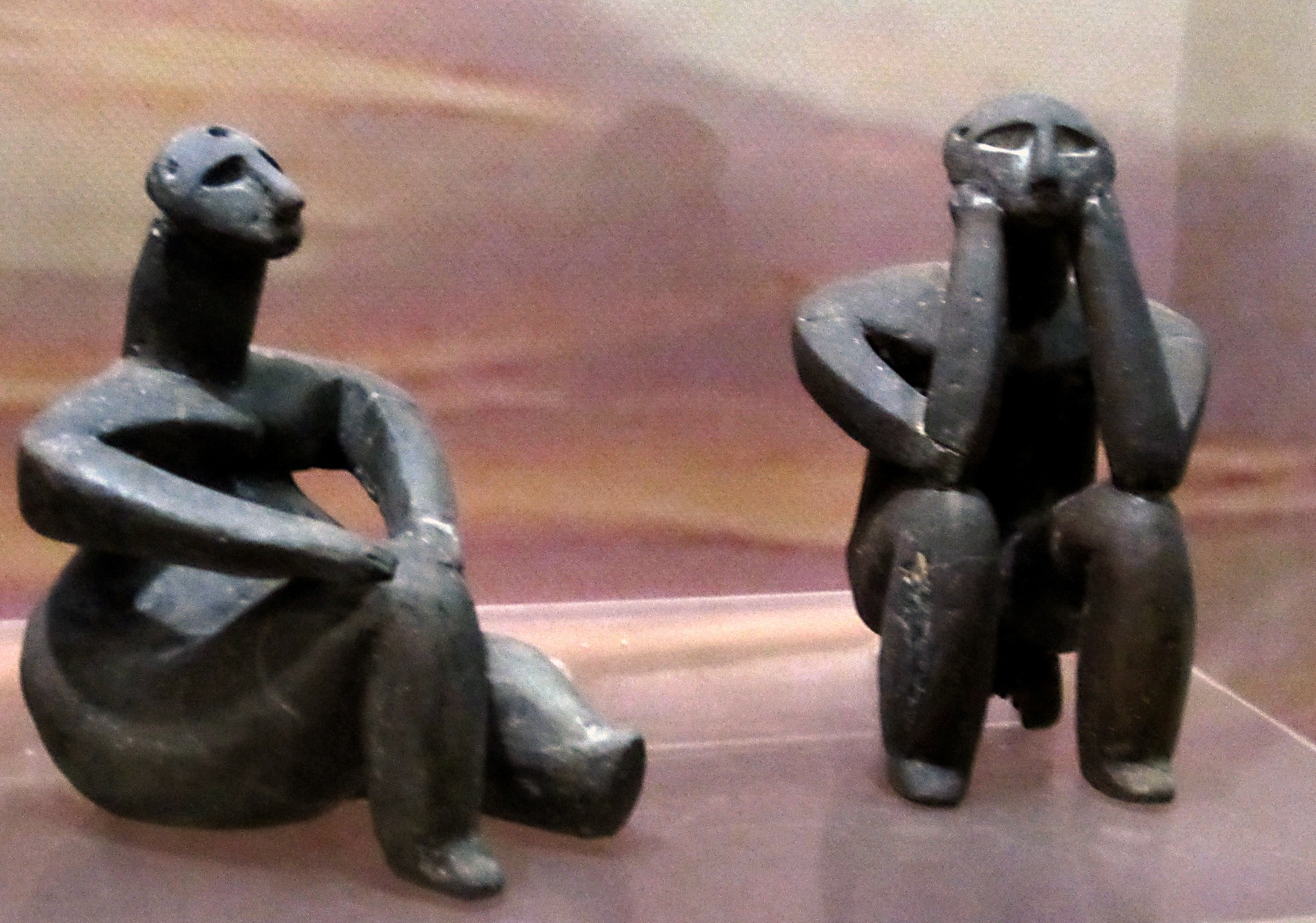
The thinking figurines of the Hamangia culture—the "Thinkers" (National History and Archaeology Museum, Constanța)

Hoes, coulters and other tools made of antler were unearthed at nine "Schela Cladovei" settlements along the Lower Danube, suggesting that cultivation of plants began in the lands now forming Romania between around 9500 and 7500 BC. Animal husbandry appeared 1500 or 2000 years later with the arrival of a new population—the bearers of the "Gura Baciului-Cârcea/Precriş culture"—from the southern parts of the Balkan Peninsula. They lived in pit-houses and used chiseled stone tools. They decorated their fine pottery with geographical figures and produced clay figurines.

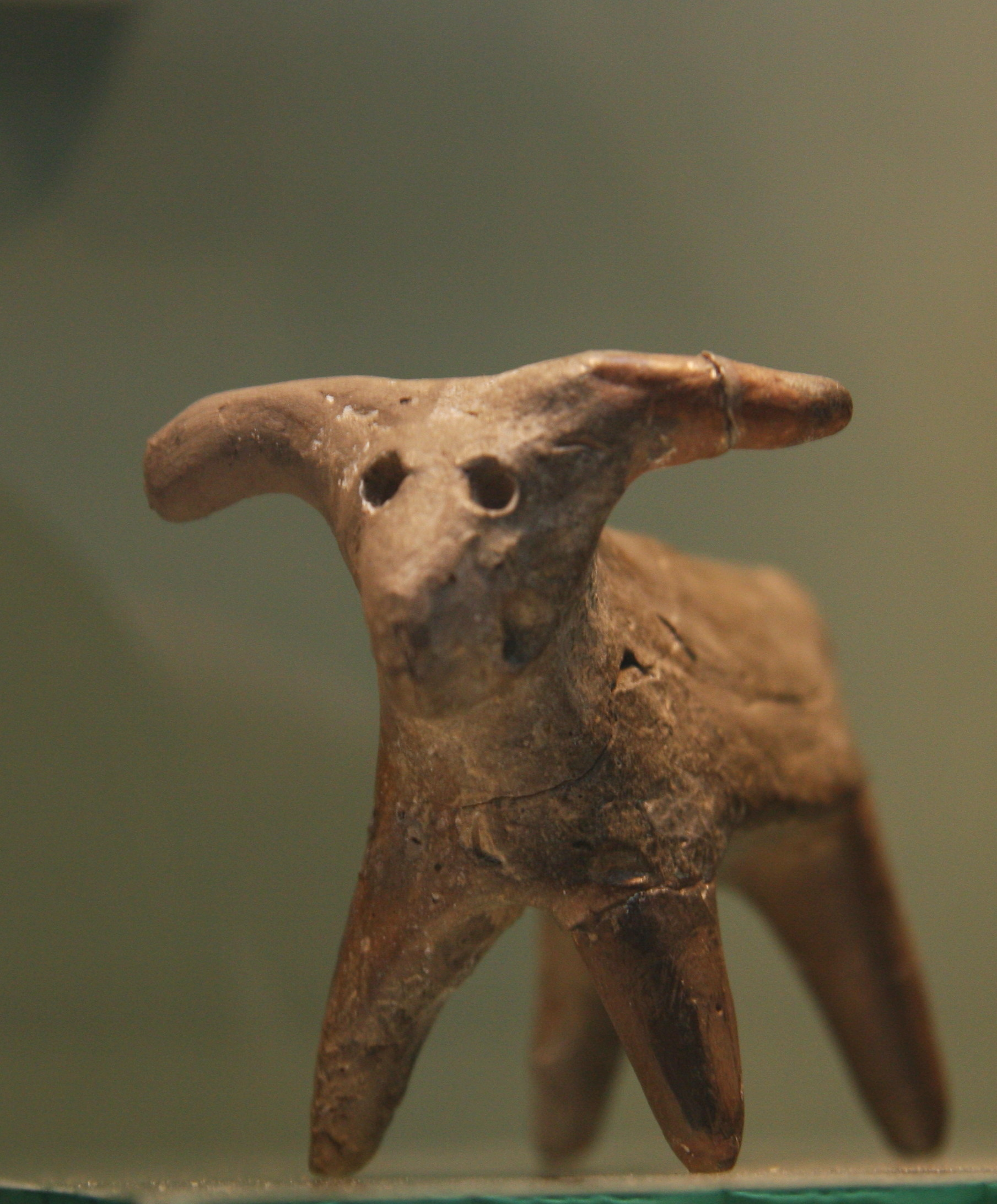
A zoomorphic "Cucuteni-Trypillian" figurine

The antrophomorphic figurines of the "Hamangia culture", which flourished in the region between the Lower Danube and the Black Sea until around 4000 BC, are outstanding representatives of Neolithic art. In addition to figurines, colored pottery featured the "Cucuteni-Trypillian culture" of Muntenia, northeastern Moldavia and southern Transylvania. "Cucuteni-Trypillian" settlements, which often covered an area reaching 6 hectares (15 acres), flourished until around 2000 BC. Production of copper tools and artifacts—pins, hooks, and pendants—and the use of gold can also be demonstrated from the last centuries of the Stone Age.

Practically nothing is known of the languages spoken by the locals in this period. Historians—for instance, Vlad Georgescu and Mihai Rotea—say that the spread of Indo-European languages began in the period between 2500 and 2000 BC. Fortified settlements and the great number of weapons—arrowheads, spears and knife blades—unearthed in them show that the stability featuring the Stone Age cultures of "Old Europe" came to an end in the same period.

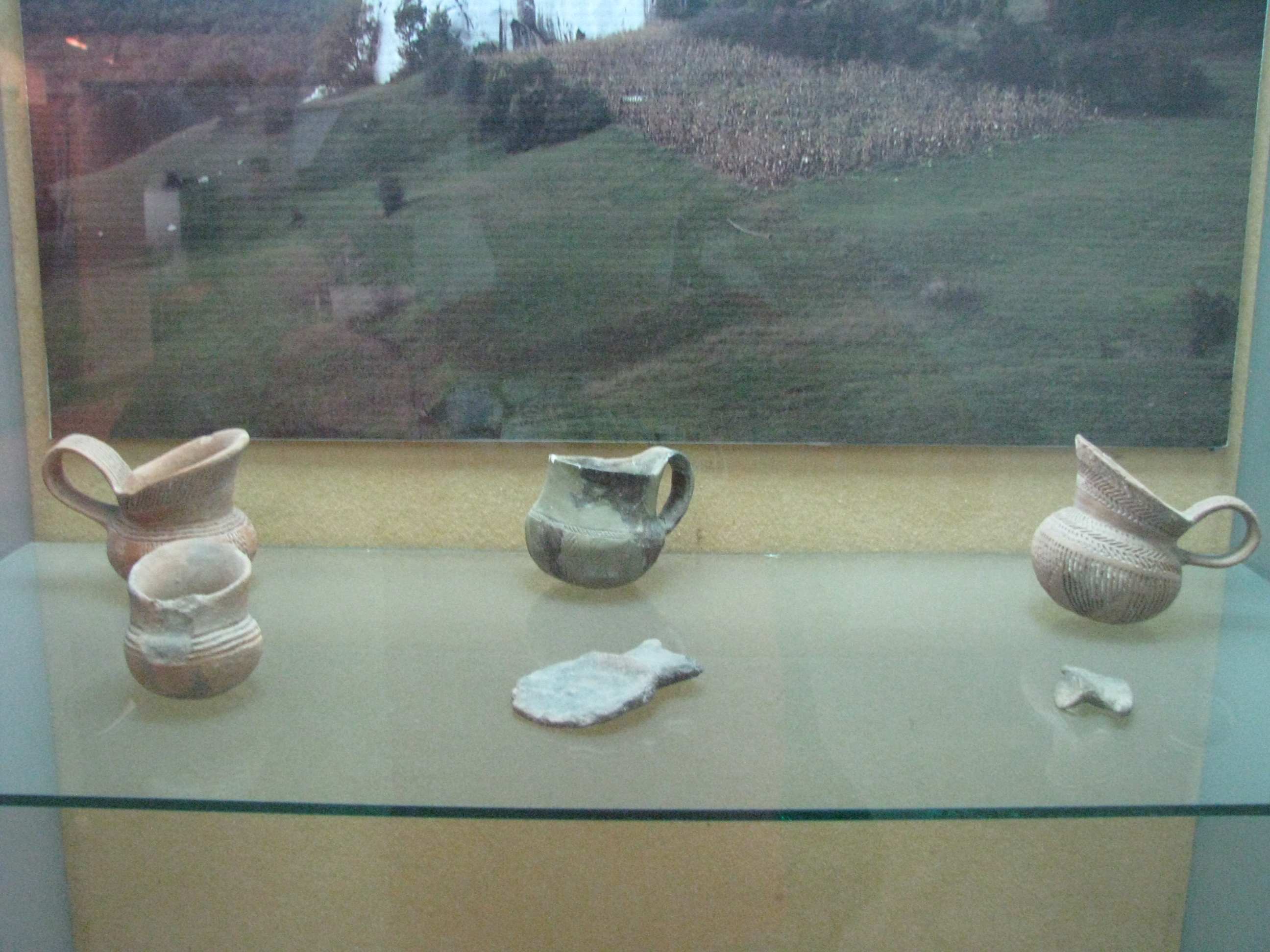
"Coțofeni" vessels

Coexistence of a great number of transitory cultures, including the "Coțofeni" and "Glina cultures" characterized the first centuries of the Bronze Age. Metallurgy developed in the following period; deposits containing thousands of bronze tools, weapons and jewels from between around 2000 and 1500 BC were unearthed at many places, including Uioara de Sus and Șpălnaca in Transylvania. Finds of amber delivered from the coast of the Baltic Sea and weapons produced in Mycenaean Greece show the importance of trading with these distant regions of Europe. From around 1100 BC, a homogenization of pottery decorations and the development of new archaeological cultures can be detected. These new cultures spread over large territories; for instance, the "Basarabi culture" flourished in the wider region of the Lower Danube. The sporadic use of iron also began around 1100 BC, but it only became widespread about 350 years later.

== Before the Romans ==
=== Greek colonies ===
Ionian colonists from Miletus founded Histria, the first Greek town on the Black Sea coast of present-day Romania. According to Eusebius of Caesarea's Chronicle, this happened in 657 BC. Archaeological finds—mainly pottery—suggest that the first Greek colonists settled in Histria between the 650s and 620s BC. The second colony, Tomis was also founded by settlers from Miletus who arrived in the 7th or 6th century BC. However, the sparseness of archaeological evidence from the first centuries of the history of Tomis implies that it was initially administered from Histria. The third Greek town, Callatis was founded by Dorian colonists from Heraclea Pontica in the second half of the 6th century BC.

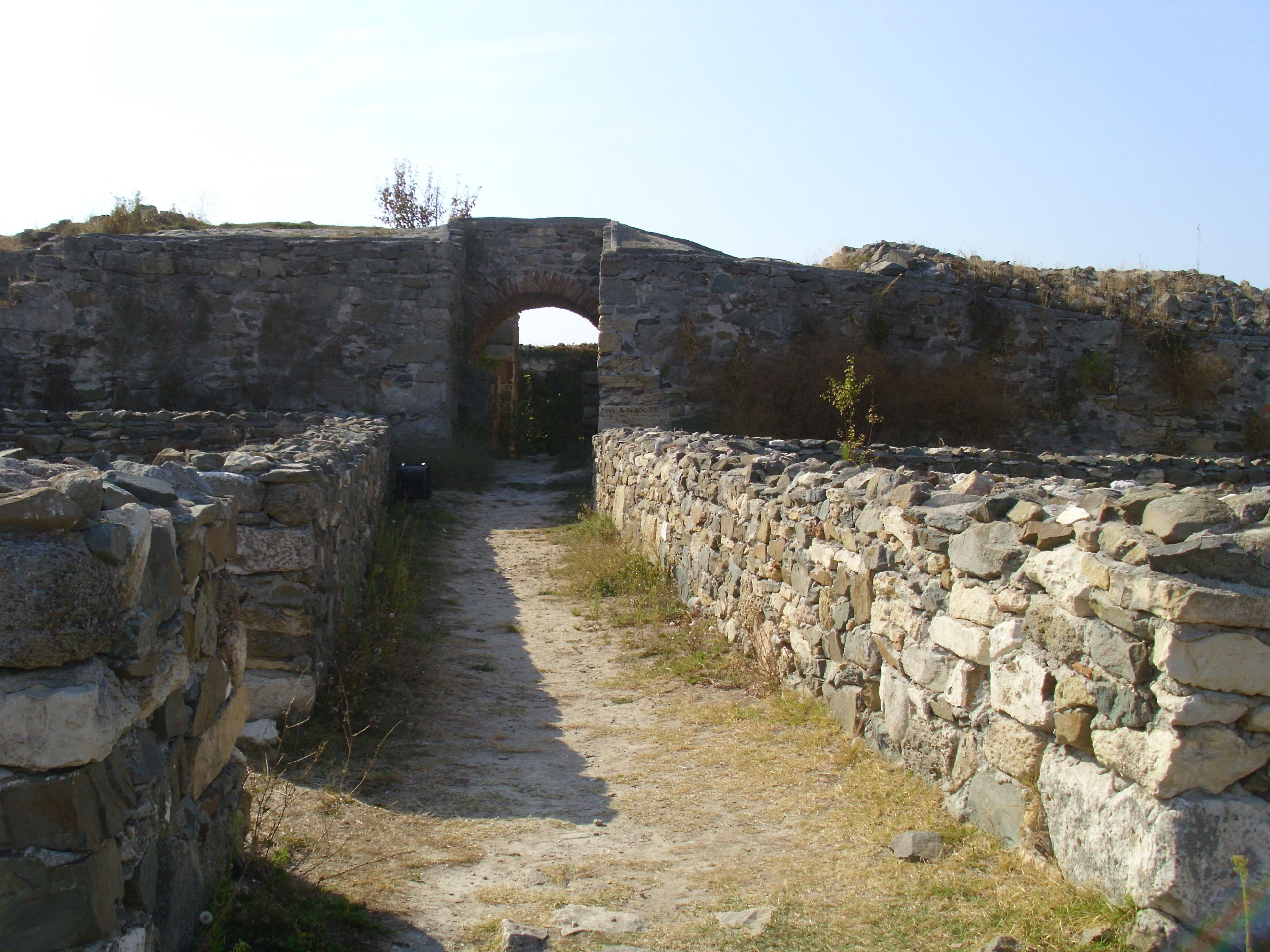
Ruins of the walls of Histria

Inscriptions from Histria and Callatis prove that the townsfolk preserved their ancestral traditions for more than half a millennium. They maintained the ancient denominations for their tribes, magistrates, and public bodies, and remained faithful to cults taken from the motherland. The three colonies developed into important centers of trade in olive oil, wine, fine pottery and jewelry. A level of houses and temples destroyed proves that an unidentified enemy—according to the scholar Paul MacKendrick, Scythians—took and sacked Histria in the late 6th century BC.

Initially, the constitution of Histria was an oligarchy, but, as Aristotle recorded, "it ended in the rule of the populace". MacKendrick writes that this change from the rule of aristocratic families to democracy occurred around 450 BC. Thereafter an assembly and council administered Histria; their members were elected by the free male citizens of the town. Callatis also became a democracy in the second half of the 5th century BC. According to MacKendrick, the fragment "KA…" in an inscription listing the Greek towns paying tribute to Athens refers to Callatis, proving that the town became a member of the Delian League.

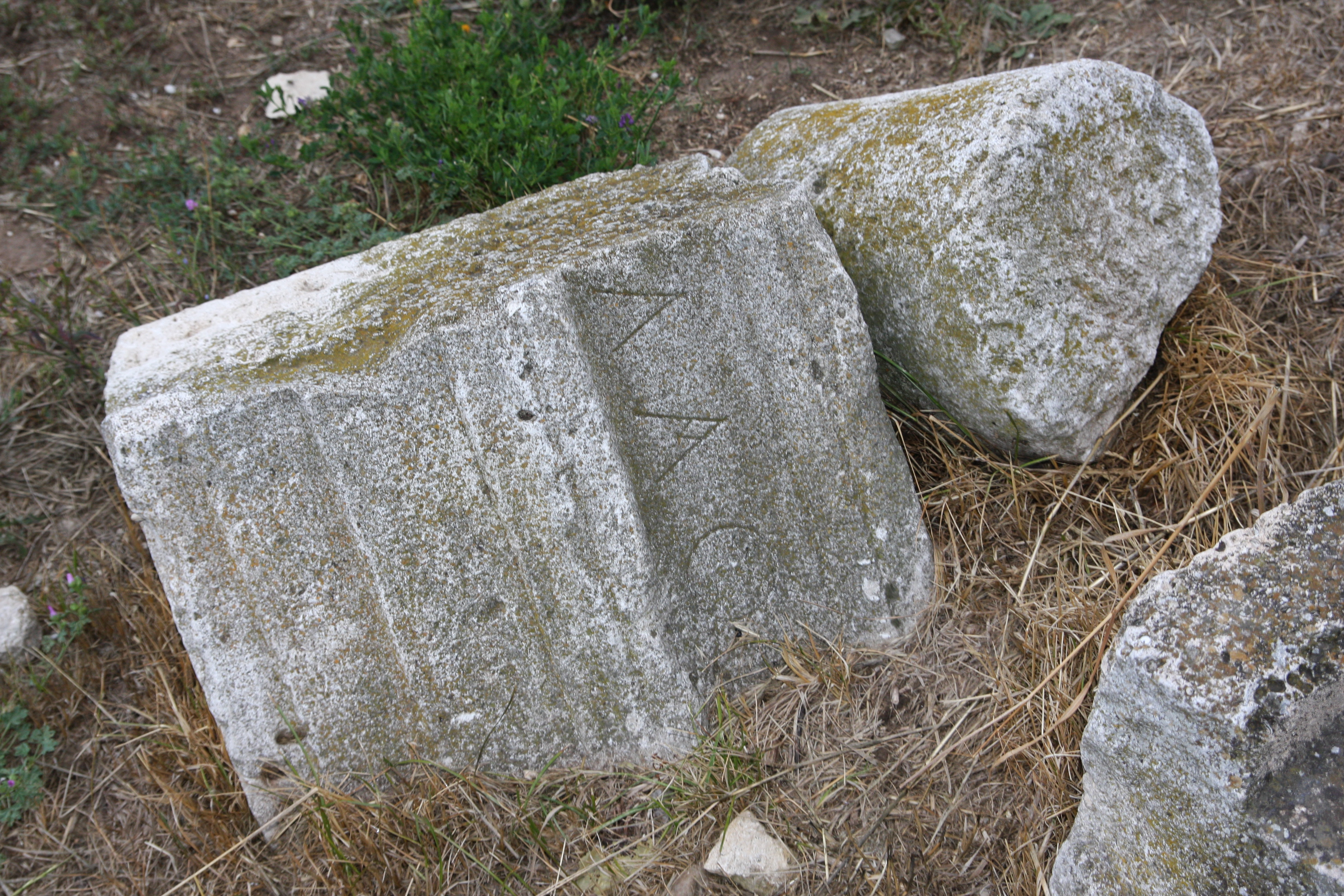
Ruins in Callatis

For defensive purposes, both Histria and Callatis were surrounded by walls: the former in the 4th and 2nd centuries BC, the latter in the 4th century BC. King Lysimachus of Thrace forced Histria to accept his suzerainty in the 310s BC, and Celts sacked the town in 279 BC. Histria and Callatis attempted to take the port of Tomis, but they were defeated around 262 BC.

=== Getae ===
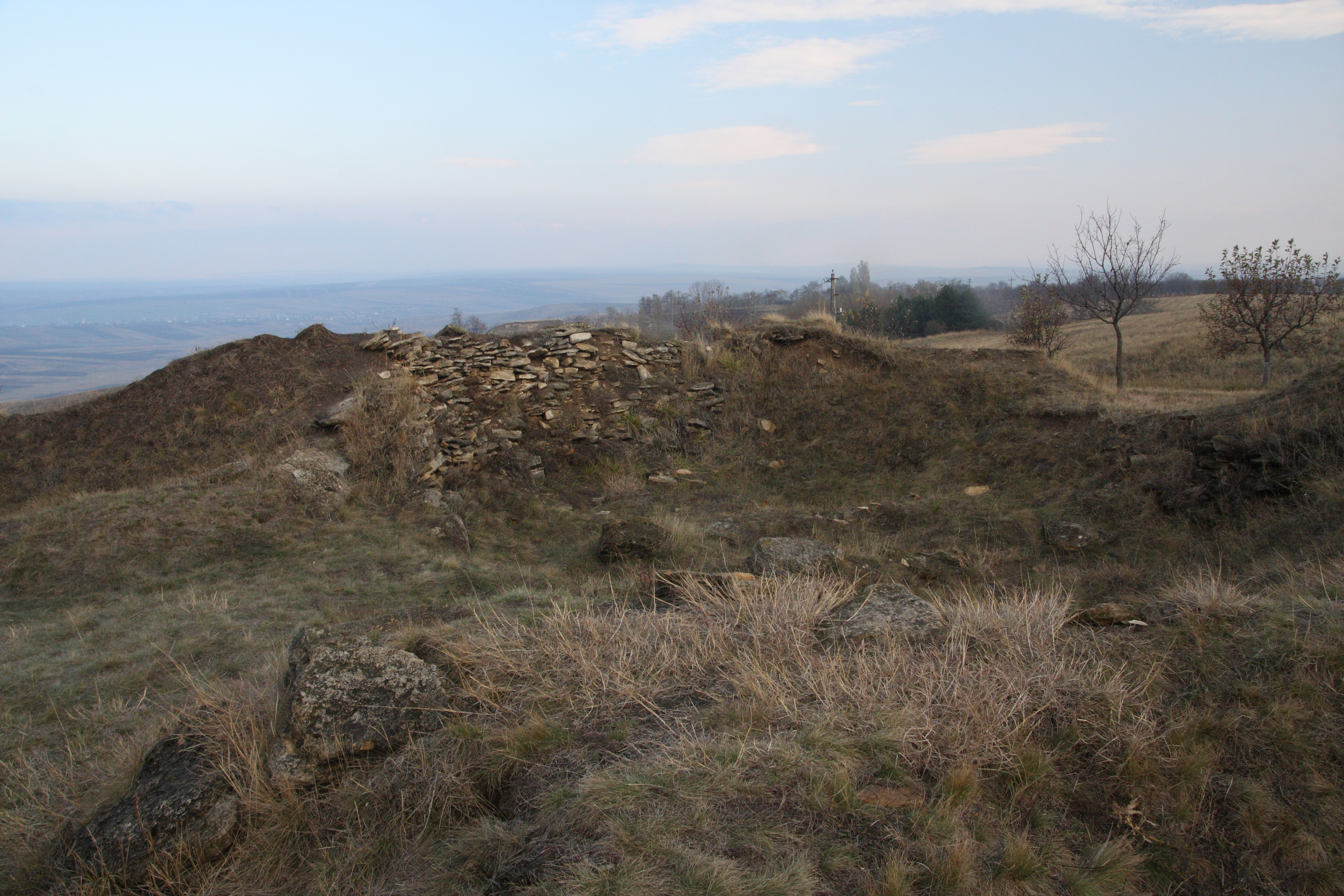
Remains of a tumulus from the 4th century BC (Cucuteni)

The natives of the Lower Danube region came to the attention of classical authors after the establishment of Greek colonies along the Black Sea shore. In the early 5th century BC, Hecataeus of Miletus's Europe referred to two local tribes, the Crobydae and the Trixae. Sophocles wrote of a local ruler named Charnabon in his Triptolemos. Herodotus was the first writer who thoroughly described the tribes dwelling to the north of the Lower Danube. He wrote of the Getae in connection with King Darius I of Persia's campaign against the Scythians in about 513 BC. According to Herodotus, the Getae, "the most courageous and upright Thracian tribe, offered stiff resistance", but the Persians defeated and enslaved them. He also described the Getae's belief in the immortality of the soul and their practice of human sacrifices in order to send messages to their principal god, Zalmoxis.

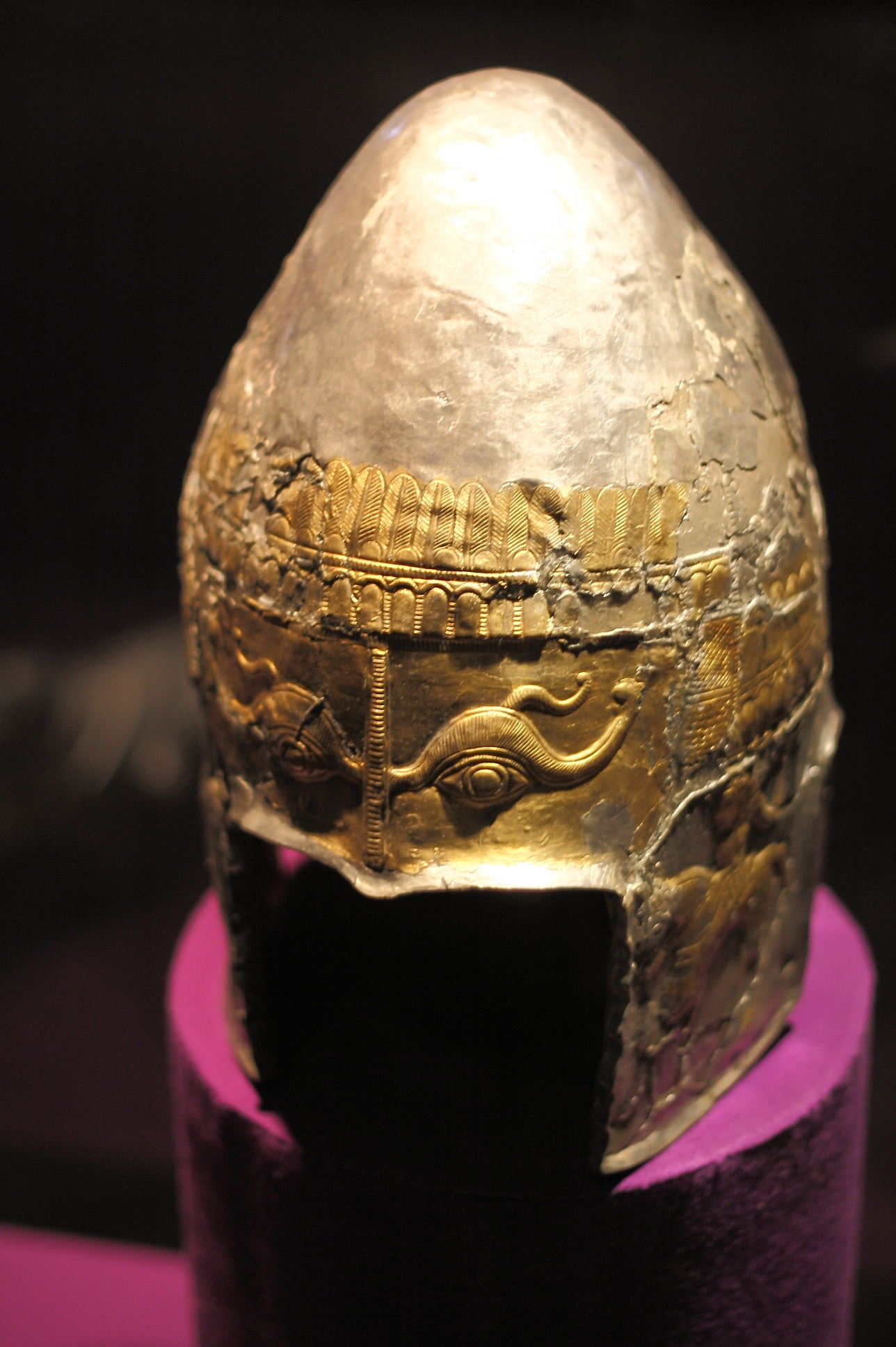
The silver-gilt helmet of a Getic chieftain from the 4th century BC unearthed at Agighiol

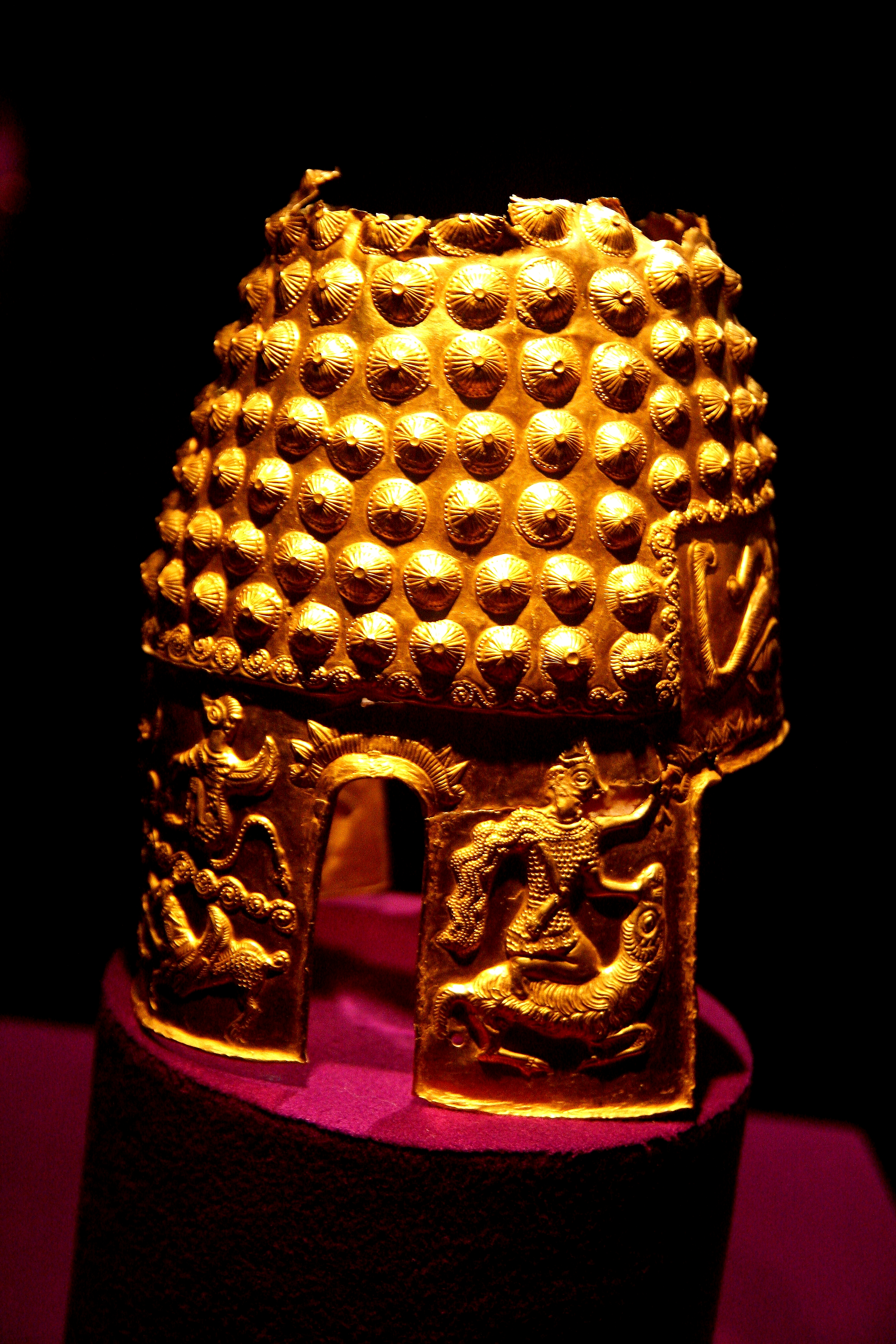
The golden helmet of a Getic chieftain from the 4th century BC found at Coţofeneşti

The "Ferigile-Bârseşti" group of cremation tumuli appeared in the foothills of the Southern Carpathians in this period. These graves yielded artifacts—pottery, weapons and jewelry—which reveals the influence of Scythian, Illyrian and Thracian art on the locals. Greek amphorae found in the native settlements unearthed at Zimnicea and other places prove that the locals were involved in the trading of wine between the Greek colonies and the regions over the Carpathian Mountains. For instance, the natives at Priscu Crăşani used amphorae produced in the Aegean islands of Thasos, Rhodes and Cos. They lived in wattle-and-daub huts. Silver artifacts (including a helmet and a cup) from the princely tomb unearthed at Agighiol, and the gold helmet found at Coțofănești evidence the wealth accumulated by native chieftains through their connections with the Greek colonies in the 4th century BC.

The "Getae beyond Haemus" who "border on the Scythians" paid tribute to the neighboring Odrysian kings in the 5th century BC, according to Thucydides. He adds that the Getae, who were mounted archers, supported King Sitalkes of the Odyssians against Athens in 429 BC. In 335 BC, according to Arrian, Alexander the Great launched a one-day raid across the Lower Danube against the Getae who could not prevent him from crossing the river. In connection with the raid, Arrian refers to "a deep cornfield" of the Getae and makes mention of their "poorly fortified" city.

After Alexander the Great's death, Lysimachus of Thrace ruled the northern regions of the Balkan Peninsula. He waged wars against King Dromichaetes of the Getae, but could not defeat him. The latter even captured Lysimachus and forced him to withdraw his troops from the lands between the Lower Danube and the Haemus in 292 BC. The subsequent history of Dromichaetes and his realm are unknown. According to the historian Vlad Georgescu, Dromichaetes's kingdom disintegrated into smaller polities. Inscriptions from Histria prove that in the 3rd century BC the Greeks paid tribute to local chieftains, including the Getic Zalmodegicus and Rhemaxos, in exchange for their protection against raids by other neighboring "barbarians".

=== Syginnae ===
The Syginnae, who had "small, short-faced, long-haired horses", according to Herodotus, were the bearers of the "Szentes-Vekerzug culture". This archaeological culture, which is featured by bridles and bits made of iron, flourished in the plains along the river Tisa from around 600 to the second half of the 4th century BC. The Syginnae's ethnic affiliation remained uncertain, but they were neither Thracians nor Scythians, according to the historian Timothy Taylor. Their territory was surrounded by rural settlements, including the villages of the "Sanislău-Nir culture" in Crişana, which suggests that the Syginnae were immigrants who forced the local population to accept their rule.

=== Agathyrsi ===
Herodotus writes that the Mureș River "rises in Agathyrsian territory", proving that this tribe of warriors dominated large territories in Transylvania in the late 5th century BC. Inhumation graves unearthed at Aiud, Blaj, Ciumbrud, and other sites along the rivers Mureș and Târnava yielded artifacts, both metal work and pottery, with analogies in sites attributed to the Scythians in the Pontic steppes. However, the identification of the Agathyrsi as a Scythian tribe is controversial, because the making of their artifacts, especially their swords, found in Transylvania differs from the technique applied in the Pontic steppes. The Agathyrsi's "way of life" was actually "similar to that of the Thracians", as it was emphasized by Herodotus himself.

Quivers decorated with metal crosses, mirrors and other featuring artifacts of the "Agathyrsian territory" appeared in the easternmost regions of the plains along the River Tisa around 500 BC, suggesting that the Agathyrsi expanded their rule over these territories in the subsequent century. Although Aristotle in his Problems still referred to the Agathyrsi, stating that they "sang their laws, so as not to forget them", thereafter no written source makes mention of them. Their cemeteries ceased to be used around 350 BC. Whether the Agathyrsi were assimilated by other tribes, or abandoned their lands, cannot be decided.

=== Celts ===
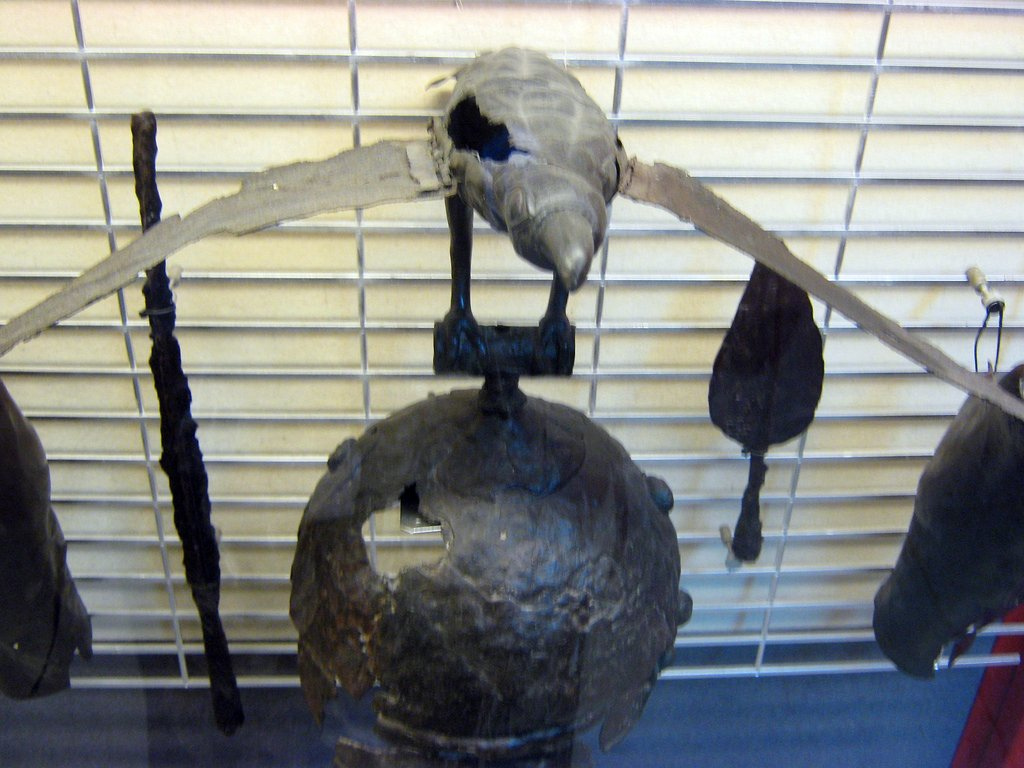
The bronze helmet of Ciumeşti from the early 3rd century BC

In the period between 450 and 200 BC, the vast territory between the Atlantic Ocean and the Eastern Carpathians experienced the spread of the "La Tène culture". It is without doubt that this culture emerged in a Celtic-speaking population, but it cannot be decided whether its spread was only the consequence of migrations or acculturation also contributed to it. In Transylvania, the arrival of the Celts is exclusively evidenced by archaeological finds, because no documents refer to this event. Isolated graves yielding "La Tène" metalwork—helmets, weapons and horse harness—prove that the first Celtic groups settled in Crişana and Transylvania after around 335 BC.

"La Tène" settlements were consisted of semi-sunken huts, each with a nearby storage pit. Large "La Tène" cemeteries were unearthed, for instance, at Ciumeşti, Orosfaia, and Pişcolt. Their inhabitants practiced both inhumation and cremation burials, and in the latter case the ashes were placed into a pit or an urn. Their unearthed artifacts, mainly pottery, also point at the cohabitation of groups preserving different traditions in the same settlements. About 10% of the graves yielded weapons, proving the existence of a class of warriors. For instance, at Ciumeşti a helmet decorated with a raven from the early 3rd century BC was found. "La Tène" cemeteries disappeared from Transylvania around 175 BC.

=== Bastarnae ===
The Bastarnae settled in the region between the rivers Siret and Dniester around 200 BC. According to Livy, their army crossed "the Danube with a large body of infantry and cavalry" in 179 BC to support King Philip V of Macedonia in his wars in the Balkan Peninsula. Strabo, Pliny the Elder and Tacitus list them among the Germanic peoples, but the latter also writes that they intermarried with the nomad Sarmatians.

Rustoiu identifies the Bastarnae as the bearers of the "Poieneşti–Lukašovka culture" of the regions to the east of the Carpathian Mountains, but this identification is not universally accepted. For instance, "Poieneşti–Lukašovka" settlements were inhabited by a sedentary population, but the historian Malcolm Todd says that the mobility of the Bastarnic warriors suggests that they were mustered by a nomad or semi-nomad people. Besides ceramics featuring the culture, "Poieneşti–Lukašovka" sites yielded pottery with analogies in Dacian and Celtic sites.

== Towards Roman occupation ==
=== Greek colonies ===
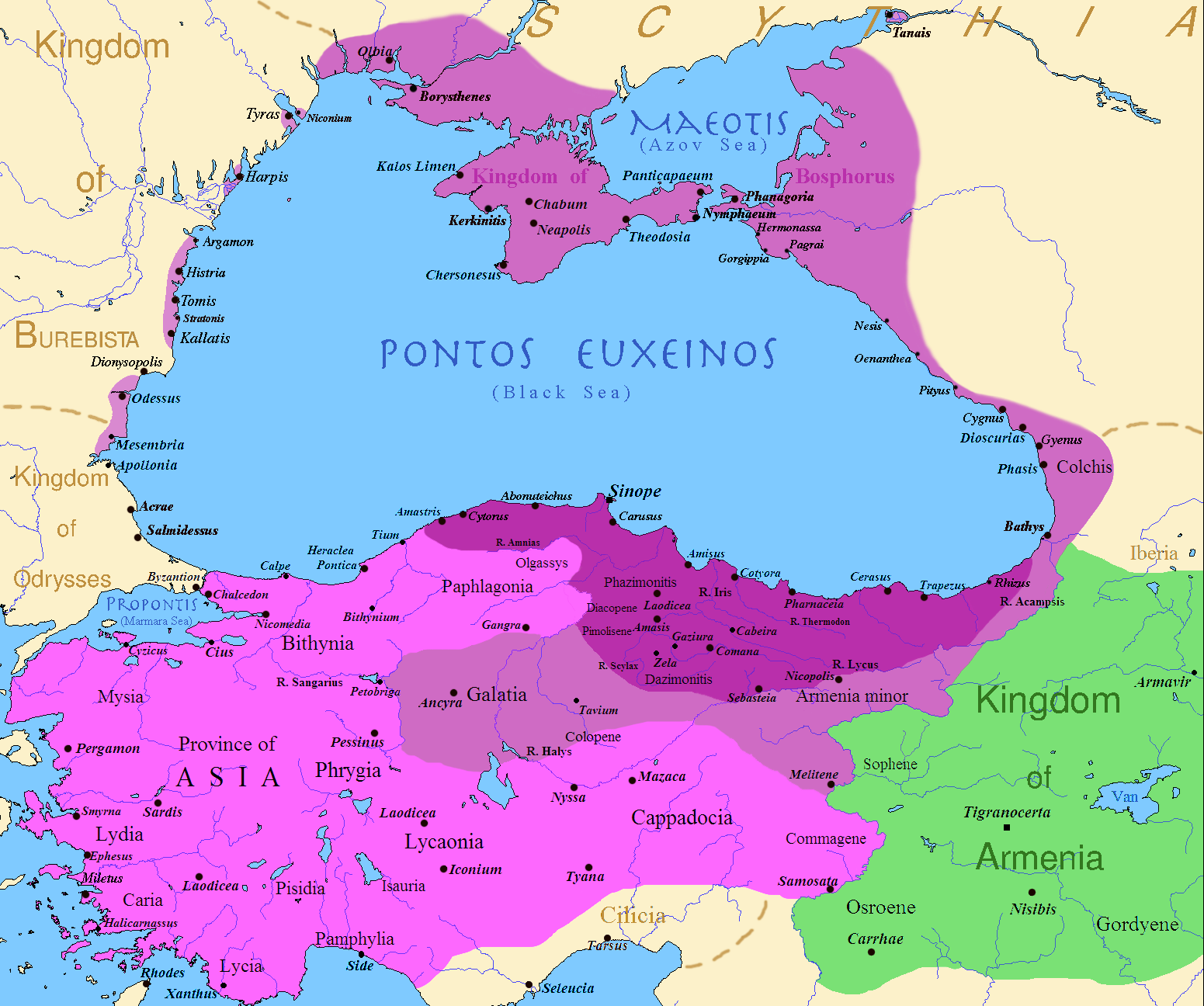
The expansion of the Kingdom of Pontus under Mithridates VI (c. 120–63 BC): (1) the kingdom before his reign (dark purple) (2) after his conquests (purple) (3) his conquests in the First Mithridatic War (89–85 BC) (pink)

Callatis, Histria and Tomis accepted the suzerainty of King Mithridates VI of Pontus around 110 BC. His expansionist policy clashed with the interests of the Romans who had by that time started to advance in Southeastern Europe. The governor of the Roman province of Macedonia, Marcus Terentius Varro Lucullus forced Callatis to sign a treaty of alliance with the Roman Empire in 72 or 71 BC. According to MacKendrick, it is plausible that Histria and Tomis concluded a similar treaty with the Romans around the same time, because the empire needed their ports for naval bases in the Black Sea.

The three towns made an anti-Roman alliance with the Bastarnae, the Getae and other "barbarian" tribes in 61 BC. They inflicted a decisive defeat on the Roman armies which were under the command of Gaius Antonius Hybrida, Proconsul of Macedonia. King Burebista of the Dacians subjugated the three Greek colonies in about 50 BC. An inscription from the same time refers to the "second founding" of Histria, implying that it had been nearly destroyed during the previous wars.

Callatis, Histria and Tomis regained their freedom after the death of Burebista in 44 BC. However, their independence became nominal and they accepted Roman protectorate after the expedition of 27 BC by Marcus Licinius Crassus in the lands between the Lower Danube and the Black Sea. The Roman poet, Ovid spent his last years in exile in Tomis between 9 and 17 AD. His poems evidence that barbarian attack was a constant menace for the townsfolk in this period.

Would you care to learn the nature of the local inhabitants,
find out amid what customs I survive?
They're a mixed stock, Greek and native, but the natives –
still barely civilized – prevail.
Great hordes of tribal nomads – Sarmatians, Getae –
come riding in and out here, hog the crown
of the road, every one of them carrying bow and quiver
and poisoned arrows, yellow with viper's gall:
harsh voices, fierce faces, warriors incarnate,
hair and beards shaggy, untrimmed,
hands not slow to draw – and drive home – the sheath knife
that each barbarian wears strapped at his side.

— Ovid: Tristia

=== Dacians ===
The earliest records of the Dacians are connected to their conflicts with the Roman Empire in the 2nd century BC. Strabo writes, in his Geographica, that their language "is the same as that of the Getae". He adds that the distinction between the Getae and the Dacians is based on their location: the Getae are "those who incline towards the Pontus and the east," and the Dacians are "those who incline in the opposite direction towards Germany and the sources of the Ister".

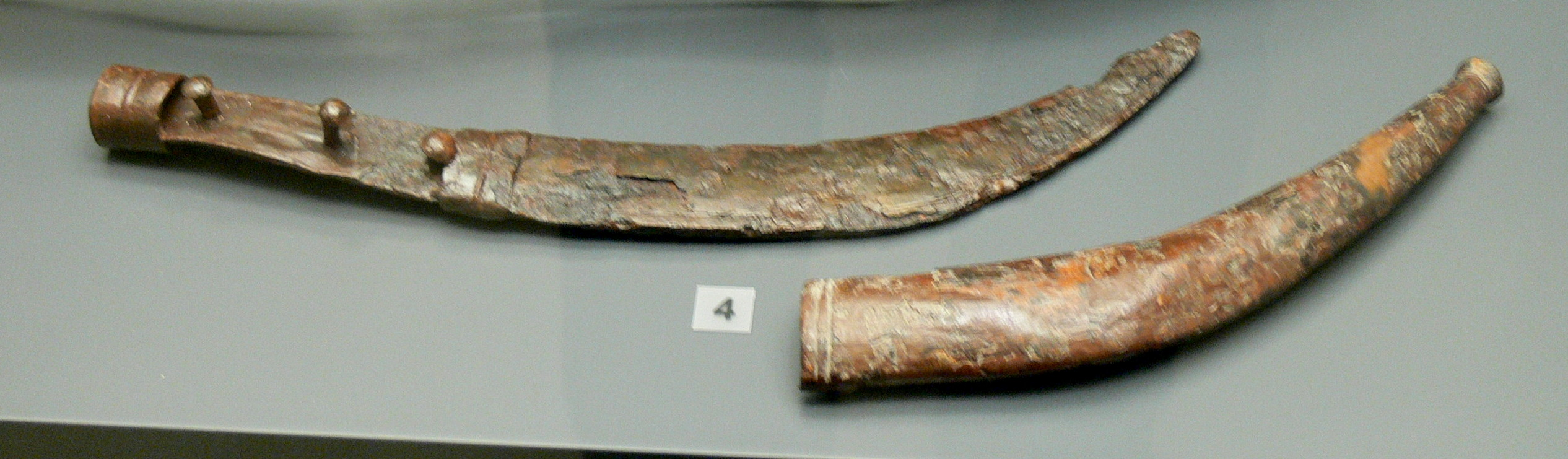
An iron sica or dagger and its scabbard from the 1st century BC unearthed at Cugir

Archaeological finds—cremation graves yielding horse bits, curved daggers or sica, swords and other weapons—evidence the development of a military elite in the territories to the north of the Lower Danube in the 3rd–1st centuries BC. Tumuli with similar grave goods appeared in the same region and expanded towards southwest Transylvania and southern Moldavia from around 100 BC. The military character of the new elite is proven by the frequent raids against the neighboring territories, primarily in Thrace and Macedonia, from the 110s BC, which provoked counter-attacks by the Romans. For instance, Frontinus writes of Marcus Minucius Rufus's victory over "the Scordiscans and Dacians" in 109 BC, and Florus says that Gaius Scribonius Curio, Proconsul of Macedonia "reached Dacia, but shrank from its gloomy forests" in 74 BC.

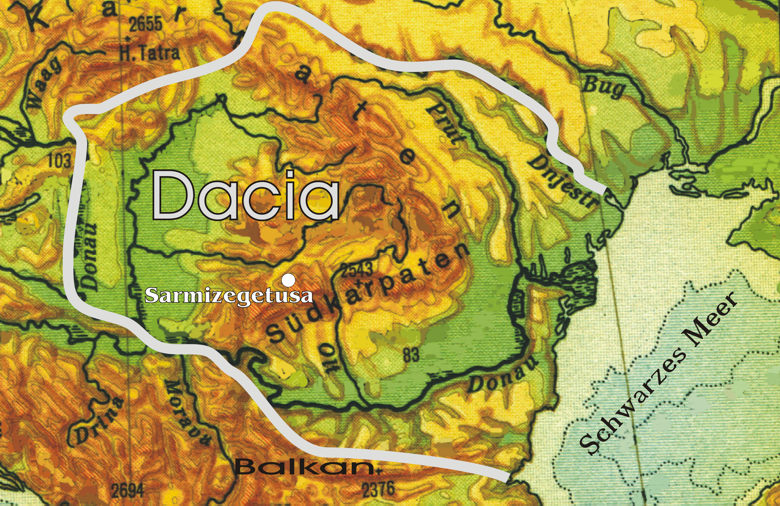
The kingdom of Burebista in the last years of his reign

The native tribes of the wider region of the Lower Danube were for the first time united under King Burebista who ruled from around 80 or 70 BC. He defeated the Boii and the Taurisci, who dwelled in the Middle Danube region, around 60 BC, subdued the Scordisci and made plundering raids against Thracia, Illyricum and Macedonia in the subsequent years. In the middle of the 1st century BC, his empire was bordered by the Middle Danube, the Northern Carpathians, the Black Sea and the Balkan Mountains. Its center was located in the Orăştie Mountains where Burebista had a number of fortifications erected. This forts were built by Greek craftsmen who introduced the use of chiseled stone.

Strabo writes that Burebista "had as his coadjutor Deceneus, a wizard", who assisted him to stabilize his rule among the Dacians. Deceneus reformed the cult of Zalmoxis. He persuaded the Dacians "to cut down their vines and to live without wine", according to Strabo. The 6th-century historian, Jordanes, who preserved information originally recorded by Dio Chrysostom, writes that Deceneus "chose from among" the Dacians "those that were at that time of noblest birth and superior wisdom and taught them theology, bidding them worship certain divinities and holy places". These pilleates or tarabostes formed the ruling stratum of the Dacian society; the commoners were called capillati or comati.

Strabo writes that Burebista "was deposed" during an uprising. The year of Burebista's fall cannot exactly be determined, but most historians write that he was assassinated in 44 BC. Strabo narrates that after Burebista's death his empire fall apart and four (later five) smaller polities developed in its ruins. The names of some of their kings were recorded by Roman writers. For instance, Dicomes, "the king of the Getae, promised to come and join" Mark Antony "with a great army", according to Plutarch.

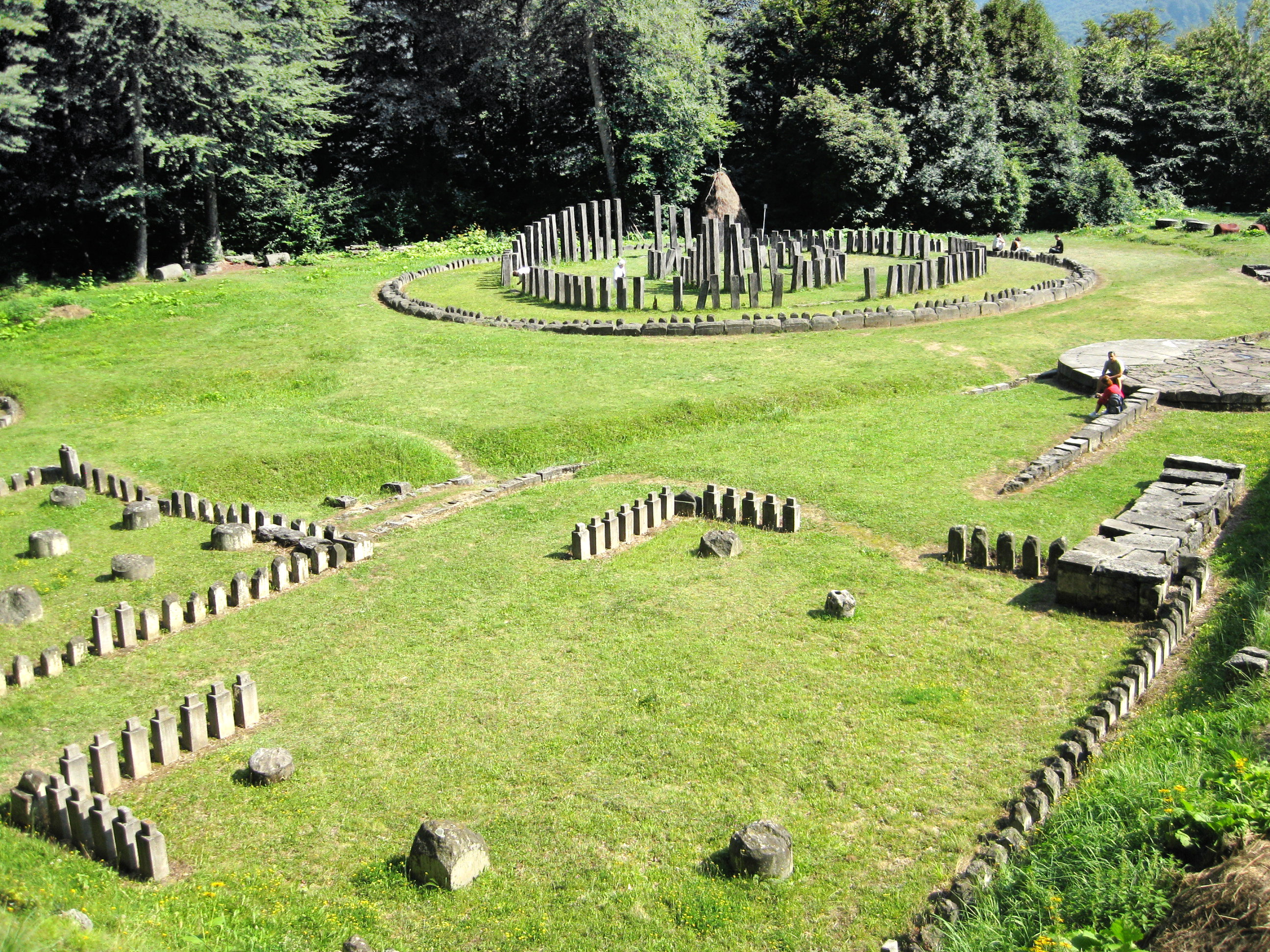
Ruins of Sarmizegetusa Regia, the capital of Decebalus

A new empire dominated by the Dacians emerged in the reign of Decebalus who ruled from 87 AD. In the first year of his reign, he defeated a Roman army sent against Dacia in retaliation of a plundering raid in the Roman province of Moesia. Although the Romans defeated Decebalus in the Battle of Tapae in 88, he concluded a favorable peace treaty with the Roman Empire. It not only acknowledged Decebalus's status as rex amicus or client king, but the Romans also gave "large sums of money" to him "as well as artisans of every trade pertaining to both peace and war", according to Cassius Dio. Taking advantage of his treaty with the Romans, Decebalus improved the defenses of his kingdom. He also expanded his rule over the neighboring territories in the next decade. After these conquests, Decebalus's multiethnic empire was bordered by the Tisa, the Northern Carpathians, the Dniester and the Lower Danube, according to Gábor Vékony.

=== Bastarnae ===
Cassius Dio narrates that the Bastarnae "crossed the Ister and subdued the part of Moesia opposite them" in 29 or 28 BC. Marcus Licinius Crassus in short routed them. In the first decades of the next century, the Sarmatians who arrived from the Pontic steppes became the dominant power of the regions up to that time inhabited by the Bastarnae.

== Roman provinces and the neighboring tribes ==
=== Lower Moesia ===
The year when the lands between the Lower Danube and the Black Sea, including the three Greek colonies of Callatis, Histria and Tomis, were annexed by the Roman Empire is uncertain. According to the historians Kurt W. Treptow and Marcel Popa, this happened in 46 AD. In contrast, Coriolan Horaţiu Opreanu writes that the territory was only integrated in the province of Moesia in the reign of Emperor Vespasianus (69–79). When Moesia was divided into two parts in 86, the territory became part of Lower Moesia. The new province was administered by former consuls who commanded two Roman legions, the Legio V Macedonica and the Legio I Italica.

The region flourished under Antoninus Pius who had the roads repaired. On the other hand, an inscription written in Greek from the village of Scraptopara evidences that the locals were complaining of the heavy taxation and the irksome duty of accommodating the Roman soldiers. The walls of Callatis and Tomis were reinforced after the Costoboci had marched through the region in 170. After the end of the Marcomannic War, Emperor Marcus Aurelius had 12,000 free Dacians settled in the province.

=== Dacia Trajana ===
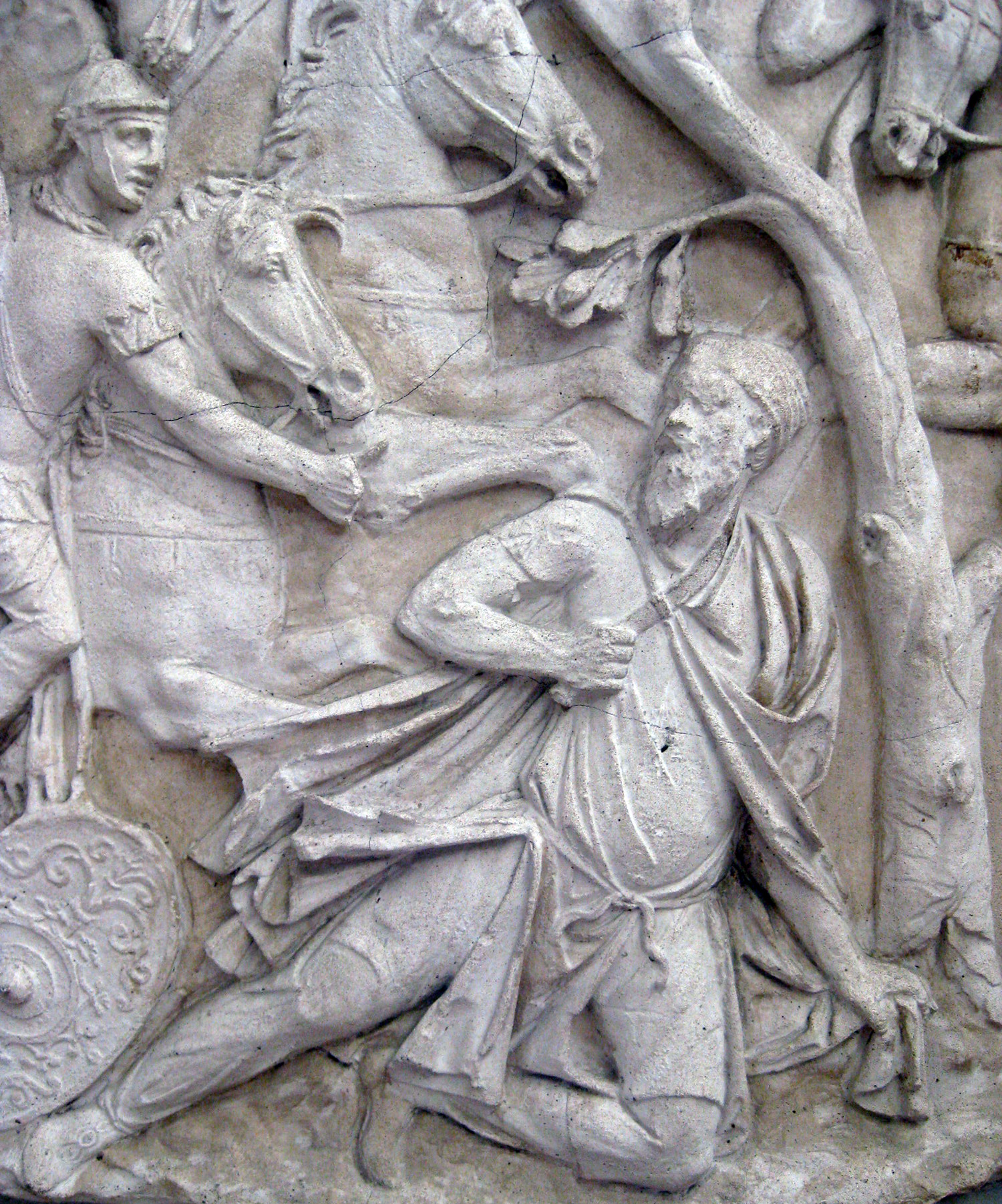
Decebalus's suicide after the Romans' triumph in the Second Dacian War (a relief on Trajan's Column in Rome)

The peaceful relationship between the Roman Empire and Decebalus's realm came to an end after Emperor Trajan ascended the throne in 98. He waged two wars against the Dacian king in the first decade of the 2nd century. After Trajan's First Dacian War, which lasted from 101 to 102, Decebalus was forced to approve of the stationement of Roman garrisons in Dacian territory, for instance at Drobeta, Romula and Tibiscum. During the Second Dacian War, the Romans annihilated the Dacian kingdom. Its core territories—Banat, Oltenia and Transylvania—were transformed into a new Roman province named Dacia in 106. The Romans also occupied Muntenia and the southern parts of Moldavia, which were annexed to the province of Moesia, but they withdrew from these territories in 119.

Roman provinces in the regions now forming Romania in the 2nd century AD

Under Emperor Trajan a procurator—a former consul—ruled the province. He commanded two legions, the Legio XIII Gemina and the Legio IV Flavia Felix. The Roman territories to the north of the Lower Danube were divided into three provinces—Upper Dacia, Lower Dacia, and Dacia Porolissensis—in the reign of Emperor Hadrian. He also withdrew the Legion IV Flavia Felix from the province. Upper Dacia, where the only Roman legion stationed in the next century, was administered by former praetors; the two other provinces were ruled by governors from the ordo equester. During the Marcomannic Wars, a new legion—the Legio V Macedonica—was transferred to Dacia. Thereafter the two legions stationed in the three provinces—now named Dacia Apulensis, Dacia Malvensis, and Dacia Porolissensis—were under the command of a former consul, the Propraetor of the Three Dacias.

Eutropius writes that Emperor Trajan transferred "vast numbers of people from all over the Roman world to inhabit the countryside and the cities", because "Dacia had, in fact, been depopulated" during the Second Dacian War. Indeed, inscriptions prove that the colonists came from many parts of the Roman Empire, but especially from Pannonia and Noricum. Although evidence of the presence of the natives after the establishment of the province is scarce, archeological sites at Boarta, Cernat, and other places in southern Transylvania prove the survival of rural communities.

The exploitation of natural resources—primarily mining of copper, gold, iron, lead, salt, and silver—had a preeminent role in the economy of Dacia province. Archaeological research also revealed the existence of workshops producing pottery, weapons, glass for the local market. Roads built for military purposes also contributed to the development of long-distance trade.

Dacia became subject of frequent plundering raids by the Carpi and other neighboring tribes from the 230s. Literary sources—for instance, Eutropius—even recorded that "Dacia, which had been added beyond the Danube by Trajan, was lost" in the reign of Gallienus (260–268). From around 259, no inscriptions prove the presence of the two legions at their headquarters in Apulum and Potaissa. The Romans officially abandoned the province under Emperor Aurelius (270–275) who "led away both soldiers and provincials, giving up hope that it could be retained", according to the Historia Augusta.

=== Costoboci ===
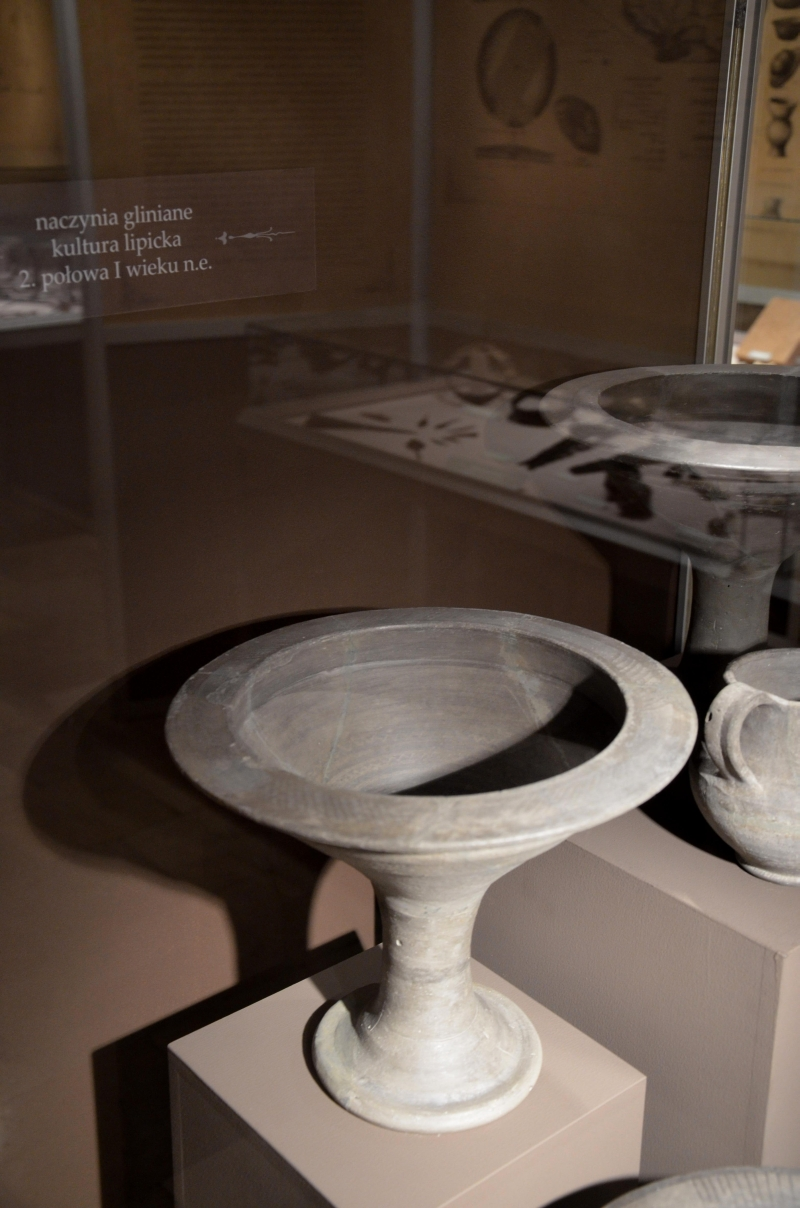
2nd-century "Lipiţa" pottery (Archaeological Museum of Kraków)

The Costoboci were a free Dacian group mentioned in the 1st and 2nd centuries in Roman sources. Their territory—"the land of the Costoboci", according to Cassius Dio—were located northwest of Dacia province. According to the archaeologist Gheorghe Bichir, the Costoboci were the bearers of the "Lipiţa culture", but this identification has not been universally accepted by scholars. A Roman inscription recorded the name of a rex Coisstobocensis ("king of the Costoboci") Pieporus, suggesting that he was an ally of the empire.

During the Marcomannic War, the Costoboci plundered the Roman provinces in the Eastern Balkans as far as Eleusis in 170. The governor or Dacia, Sextus Cornelius Clemens persuaded the Germanic Hasdingi to invade and occupy their land around 171. This was the last record of the Costoboci who disappeared from the sources. Gheorghe Bichir writes that many of them settled among the Carpi.

=== Germanic tribes ===
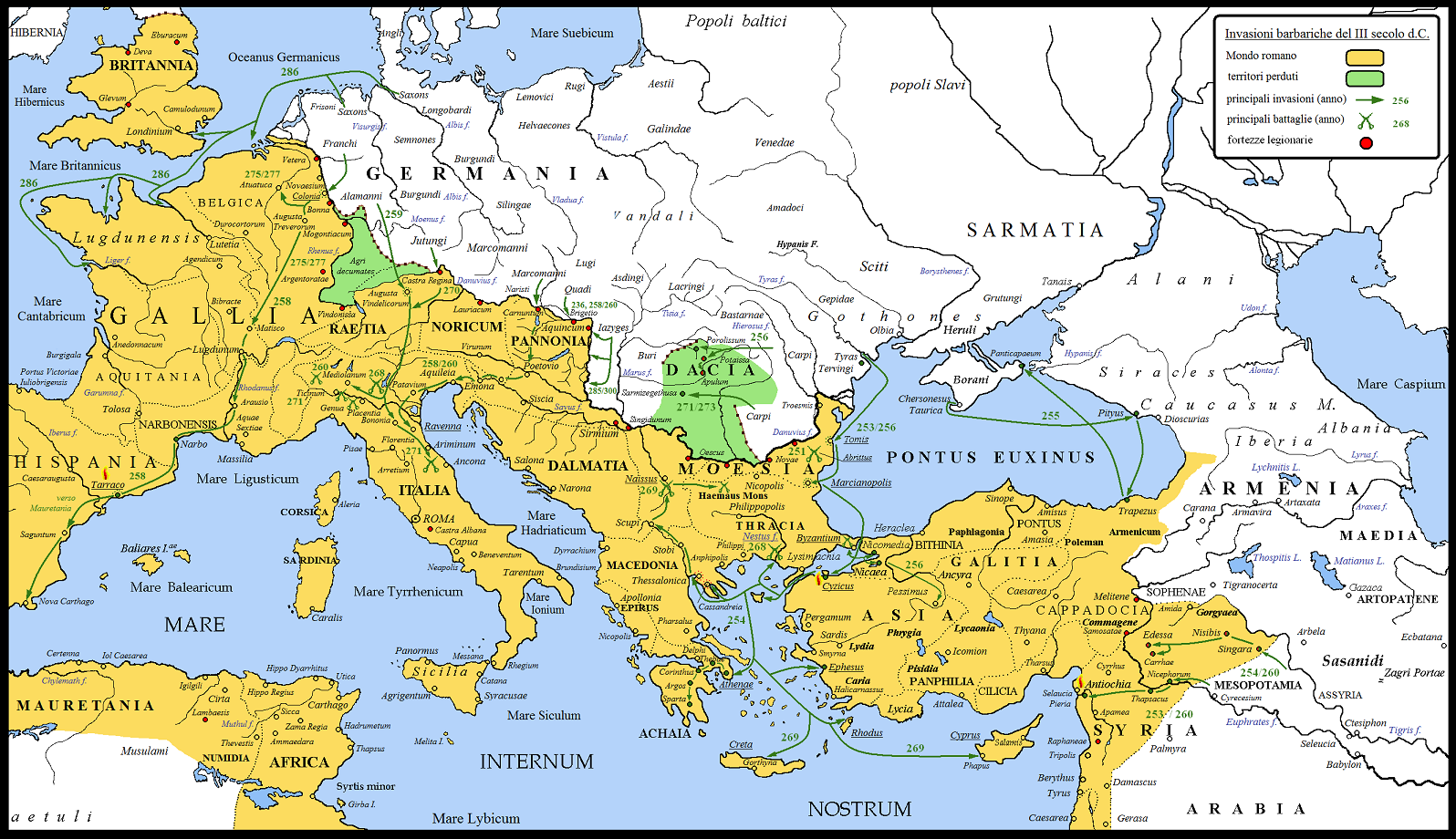
"Barbarian" invasions against the Roman Empire in the 3rd century

The Marcomannic Wars, which lasted from 162 to 180, caused a series of population shifts along the eastern frontiers of the Roman Empire. The Buri were the first Germanic people who invaded Dacia. The governor of Dacia, Sabinianus defeated them in 180. Pottery and weapons featuring the "Przeworsk culture" appeared in Apa, Boineşti, Medieșu Aurit and other sites to the northwest of Dacia province in the last decades of the 2nd century. Their spread point at the arrival of the Hasdingi, who settled in these regions after their conquest of "the land of the Costoboci". "Przeworsk" pottery, weapons and other artifacts were also found at Roman forts in Dacia, suggesting a close contact between the German tribesmen and the Romans.

A new enemy of the Roman Empire, the Goths emerged in the Pontic steppes in the first half of the 3rd century. According to their own tradition recorded by Jordanes, their migration from present-day Poland to the northern coasts of the Black Sea was a gradual process. Their first raid against the Roman Empire occurred in 238. They laid siege to Histria and forced the Romans to grant them an annual subsidy. Jordanes narrates that "some of the Taifali and Astringi, and also three thousands of the Carpi" joined the Goths during their invasion of Dacia and Moesia in 250, suggesting that the Goths had by that time become the predominant power among the tribes dwelling in the vicinity of the Roman Empire's Lower Danube frontier.

=== Carpi ===
The natives dwelling to the east of the Carpathians were collectively known as Carpi from the 3rd century. Written sources, inscriptions and literary works, evidence that the Carpi were a powerful enemy of the Roman Empire up until the 250s. For instance, Petrus Patricius recorded that they stated that they were "stronger than the Goths" when the Romans agreed to pay an annual tribute to the latter.

== Sources ==
=== Primary sources ===
- Aristotle: Problems, Books 1–19 (Edited and Translated by Robert Mayhew) (2011). President and Fellows of Harvard College. ISBN 978-0-674-99655-7.
- Eutropius: Breviarium (Translated with and introduction and commentary by H. W. Bird) (1993). Liverpool University Press. ISBN 0-85323-208-3.
- Herodotus: The Histories (A new translation by Robin Waterfield) (1998). Oxford University Press. ISBN 978-0-19-953566-8.
- Livy: Rome and the Mediterranean (Translated by Henry Bettenson with an Introduction by A. H. McDonald) (1976). Penguin Books. ISBN 0-14-044318-5.
- "Ovid: Tristia" In Ovid: The Poems of Exile – Tristia and the Black Sea Letters (Translated with an Introduction by Peter Green) (2005), pp. 1–106. University of California Press. ISBN 0-520-24260-2.
- "The Anabasis by Arrian". In Arrian: Alexander the Great – The Anabasis and the Indica (A new translation by Martin Hammond) (2013), pp. 1–225. Oxford University Press. ISBN 978-0-19-958724-7.
- The Gothic History of Jordanes (in English Version with an Introduction and a Commentary by Charles Christopher Mierow, Ph.D., Instructor in Classics in Princeton University) (2006). Evolution Publishing. ISBN 1-889758-77-9.
- The History of the Peloponnesian War by Thucydides (2013). CreateSpace Independent Publishing Platform. ISBN 978-1-466-430396.
- The Politics of Aristotle (Translated, with Introduction, Analysis and Notes by Peter L. Phillips Simpson) (1997). The University of North Carolina Press. ISBN 0-8078-2327-9.

=== Secondary sources ===
- Bichir, Gh. (1976). The Archaeology and History of the Carpi from the Second to the Fourth Century AD (BAR Supllementary Series 16(i)). Gh. Bichir and Editura Academiei Republicii Socialiste România. ISBN 0-904531-55-4.
- Bolovan, Ioan; Constantiniu, Florin; Michelson, Paul E.; Pop, Ioan Aurel; Popa, Cristian; Popa, Marcel; Scurtu, Ioan; Treptow, Kurt W.; Vultur, Marcela; Watts, Larry L. (1997). A History of Romania. The Center for Romanian Studies. ISBN 973-98091-0-3.
- Cunliffe, Barry (1994). "Iron Age Societies in Western Europe and Beyond, 800–140 BC". In Cunliffe, Barry (ed.). The Oxford Illustrated History of Prehistoric Europe. Oxford University Press. pp. 336–372. ISBN 978-0-19-285441-4.
- Georgescu, Vlad (1991). The Romanians: A History. Ohio State University Press. ISBN 0-8142-0511-9.
- Harding, Anthony (1994). "Reformation in Barbarian Europe, 1300–600 BC". In Cunliffe, Barry (ed.). The Oxford Illustrated History of Prehistoric Europe. Oxford University Press. pp. 304–335. ISBN 978-0-19-285441-4.
- Heather, Peter (2010). Empires and Barbarians: The Fall of Rome and the Birth of Europe. Oxford University Press. ISBN 978-0-19-973560-0.
- MacKendrick, Paul (1975). The Dacian Stones Speak. The University of North Carolina Press. ISBN 0-8078-1226-9.
- Oltean, Ioana A. (2007). Dacia: Landscape, Colonisation and Romanization. Routledge. ISBN 978-0-415-41252-0.
- Opreanu, Coriolan Horaţiu (2005). "The North-Danube Regions from the Roman Province of Dacia to the Emergence of the Romanian Language (2nd–8th Centuries AD)". In Pop, Ioan-Aurel; Bolovan, Ioan (eds.). History of Romania: Compendium. Romanian Cultural Institute (Center for Transylvanian Studies). pp. 59–132. ISBN 978-973-7784-12-4.
- Rotea, Mihai (2005). "Prehistory". In Pop, Ioan-Aurel; Bolovan, Ioan (eds.). History of Romania: Compendium. Romanian Cultural Institute (Center for Transylvanian Studies). pp. 9–29. ISBN 978-973-7784-12-4.
- Rustoiu, Aurel (2005). "Dacia before the Romans". In Pop, Ioan-Aurel; Bolovan, Ioan (eds.). History of Romania: Compendium. Romanian Cultural Institute (Center for Transylvanian Studies). pp. 31–58. ISBN 978-973-7784-12-4.
- Taylor, Timothy (1994). "Thracians, Scythians, and Dacians, 800 BC–AD 300". In Cunliffe, Barry (ed.). The Oxford Illustrated History of Prehistoric Europe. Oxford University Press. pp. 373–410. ISBN 978-0-19-285441-4.
- Todd, Malcolm (2003). The Early Germans. Blackwell Publishing Ltd. ISBN 0-631-16397-2.
- Treptow, Kurt W.; Popa, Marcel (1996). Historical Dictionary of Romania (European Historical Dictionaries, No. 16.). The Scarecrow Press, Inc. ISBN 0-8108-3179-1.
- Vékony, Gábor (1994). "The Prehistory of Dacia". In Köpeczi, Béla; Barta, Gábor; Bóna, István; Makkai, László; Szász, Zoltán; Borus, Judit (eds.). History of Transylvania. Akadémiai Kiadó. pp. 3–16. ISBN 963-05-6703-2.
- Wolfram, Herwig (1988). History of the Goths (Translated by Thomas J. Dunlap; New and completely revised from the second German edition). University of California Press. ISBN 978-0-520-06983-1.
