= Slavery in Dacia =

Slavery in Dacia was widespread both among the Dacian and Getae tribes and after the Roman conquest of Dacia.

== Slave trade ==
There is limited evidence of slaves being used in the economic system of the Dacians. The lower classes of Dacia (comati) were free men; however, the widespread warfare in the region made it one of the most important sources of slaves for the Roman and Greek world, with which they engaged in slave trade.

Herodotus wrote that the Thracians (which he considered to include the Getae) sold their children in slavery to traders (See Pontic slave trade). Polybius wrote that the Greeks brought slaves "of best quality" from the peoples living on the shores of the Black Sea (via the Black Sea slave trade).

During the late Roman Republic (roughly between 130 BC and 31 BC), large numbers of Roman denarii were imported into Dacia. There are over 25,000 such coins in Romanian collections, most of which were found in large hoards, a far higher number than anywhere outside the Roman Empire. An explanation for this large amount of imported Roman silver would be that the Dacians exported large numbers of slaves to Rome. Based on the number of coins, Michael Crawford estimated in 1977 that perhaps as many as 30,000 slaves were exported each year to Rome between mid-60s and 30s BC.
