= Helmet of Iron Gates =

Helmet

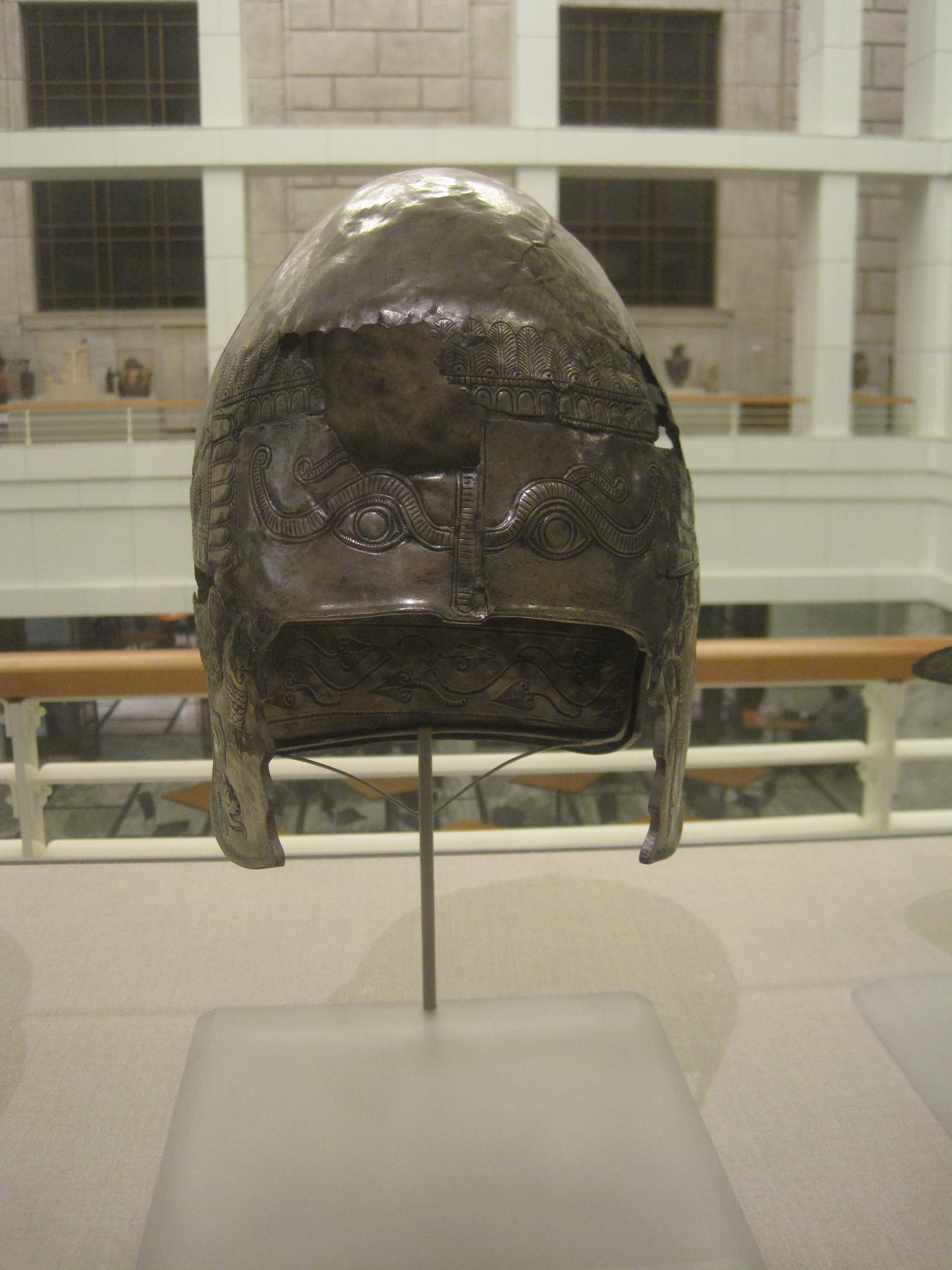
Helmet of Iron Gates.

The Helmet of Iron Gates (Romanian: Coiful de la Porțile de Fier) is a Geto-Dacian silver helmet dating from the 4th century BC, housed in the Detroit Institute of Arts, United States.

It probably comes from Iron Gates area, in the Mehedinți County, Romania. Formerly it was in the collection of Franz Tau, Vienna.

The helmet is similar to the Helmet of Coțofenești, Helmet of Peretu, Helmet of Agighiol and Helmet of Cucuteni-Băiceni, all being ancient Getian gold or silver helmets discovered so far on the territory of Romania.

== Archaeological context ==
It is referred to as “Iron Gates” as it was supposedly dredged out of the Danube in the Iron Gate gorge in 1913 or 1914. But, there is no documentary record of the Iron Gate material before 1931, the year in which the Agighiol burial was discovered containing the helmet nowadays named Agighiol helmet. It is probable that the so-called Iron Gates material was looted from the Agighiol grave shortly after its opening by local villagers. However, no other grave has been suggested for the "Iron Gate" helmet. And, In fact, it seems that both Agighiol and Iron Gates helmets had been made by the same workshop, or by the same silversmith. Also, it appears that punchmarks on the helmets had been made by the same tool.

== Iconography ==
The design is sufficiently unusual in ancient art to offer the opportunity to trace it to its origin, and, thereby, provide some insight into the elements that went into the formation of early Dacian art and the means by which ancient Oriental motifs survived and were transmitted into Europe. Almost identical in decoration and details of craftsmanship are the two silver beakers, now in Bucharest and New York, that reputedly came from the region of the Iron Gates. The other designs chased on the helmet are clearly within the Scythian sphere. The helmet type is related to and probably a little earlier in date than the gold helmet in Bucharest which shows some Sarmatian aspects. Lacking evidence of comparable helmets in the Scythian homeland, we may assign this helmet to a local development of a helmet type found in Kuban dating in the early years of the fifth century B. C, with the addition of some Greek features.

=== The "apotropaic" eyes ===
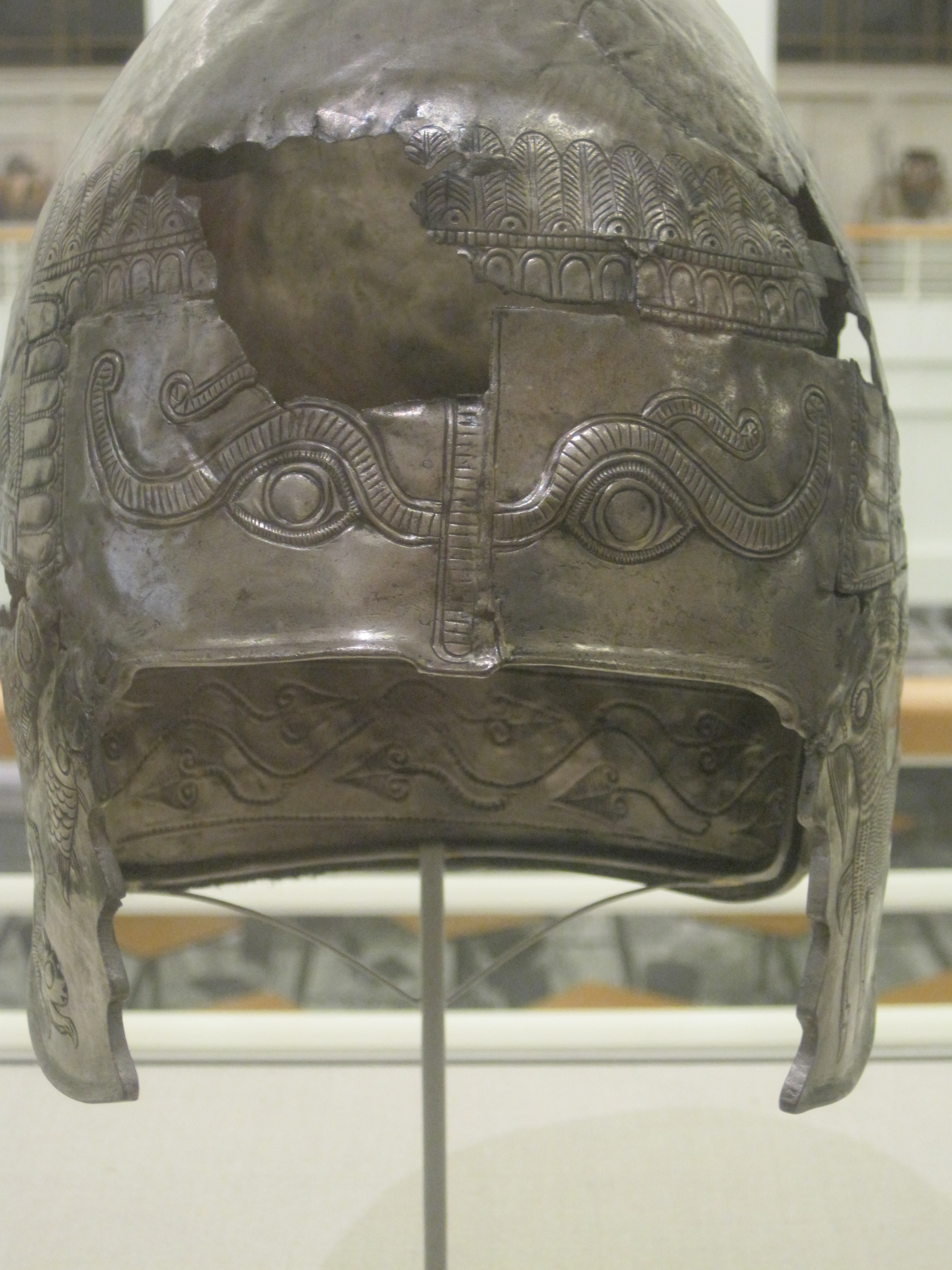
The helmet named "Iron Gate"

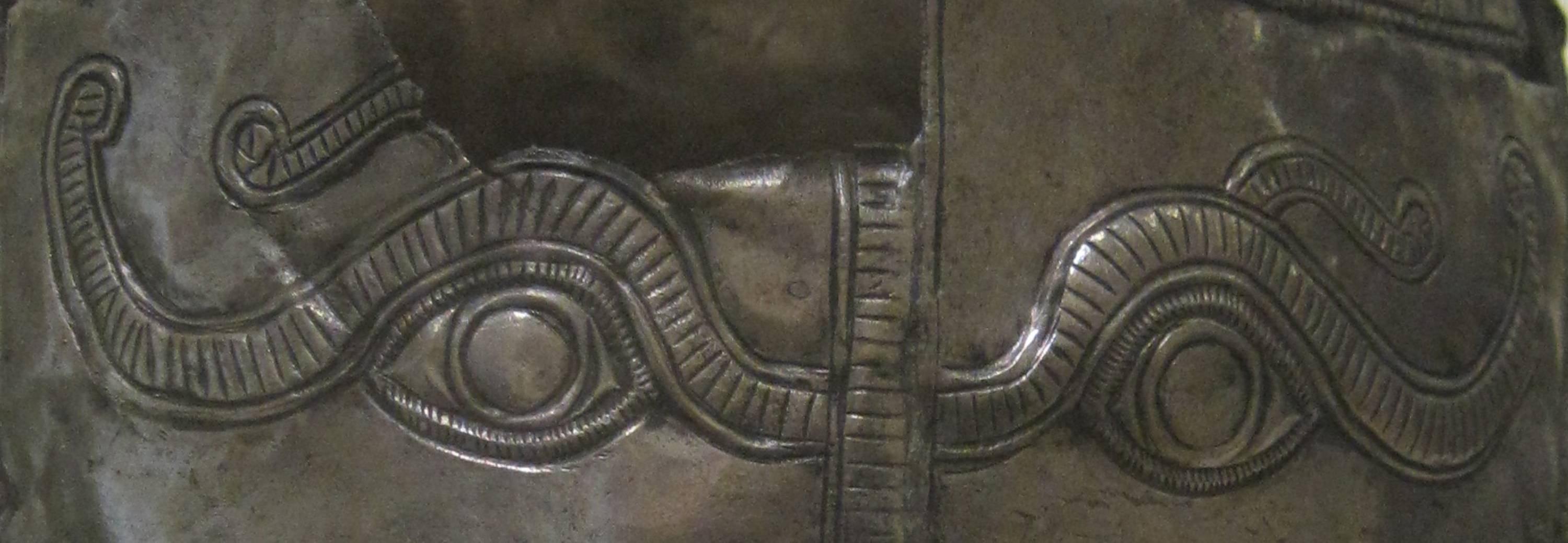
The "apotropaic" eyes motif Iron Gate helmet

The most striking feature of the helmet that is found in all five Getian helmets is their so-called "apotropaic" eyes, which could have looked out as a second set from immediately above the real eyes of the wearer. Such eyes were considered to be a borrowing from the Greek world where greaves and shields have eyes that have been considered truly apotropaic, serving to divert evil. However, it is argued that the helmets display the feature of doubling of attributes. Besides the eyes, there is the stag depicted with eight legs that is interpreted as “I run twice as fast”. Therefore, the “apotropaic eyes” could say : I see twice as well.

=== The predatory motif ===
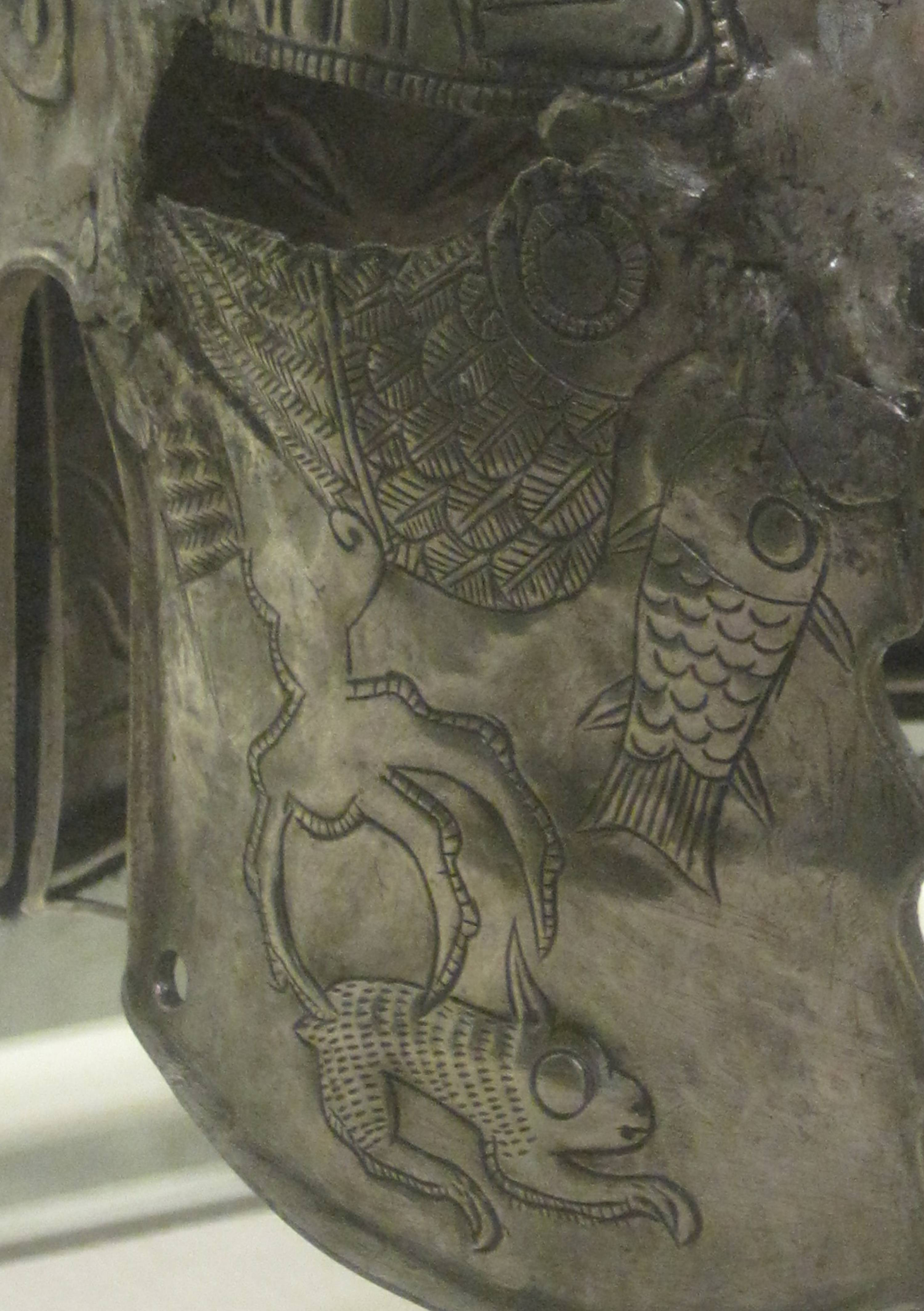
The predatory eagle-hare motif of Iron Gate helmet

The motif in question is that of a predatory bird with a great round eye and folded wing, grasping in its enormous claw a hare while a fish dangles from its beak. The beakers that reputedly came from the region of the Iron Gates (now reposited in Bucharest and New York museum) carry the same eagle-hare motif.

== See also ==
- Getae
- Dacia
- History of Romania
