= Peretu =

- Commune
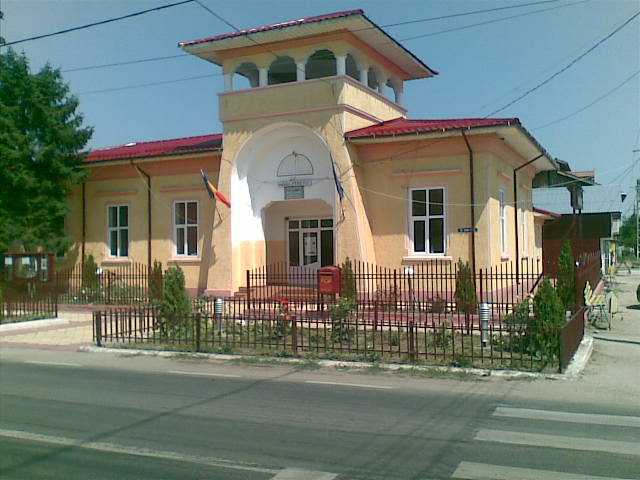
- Peretu town hall

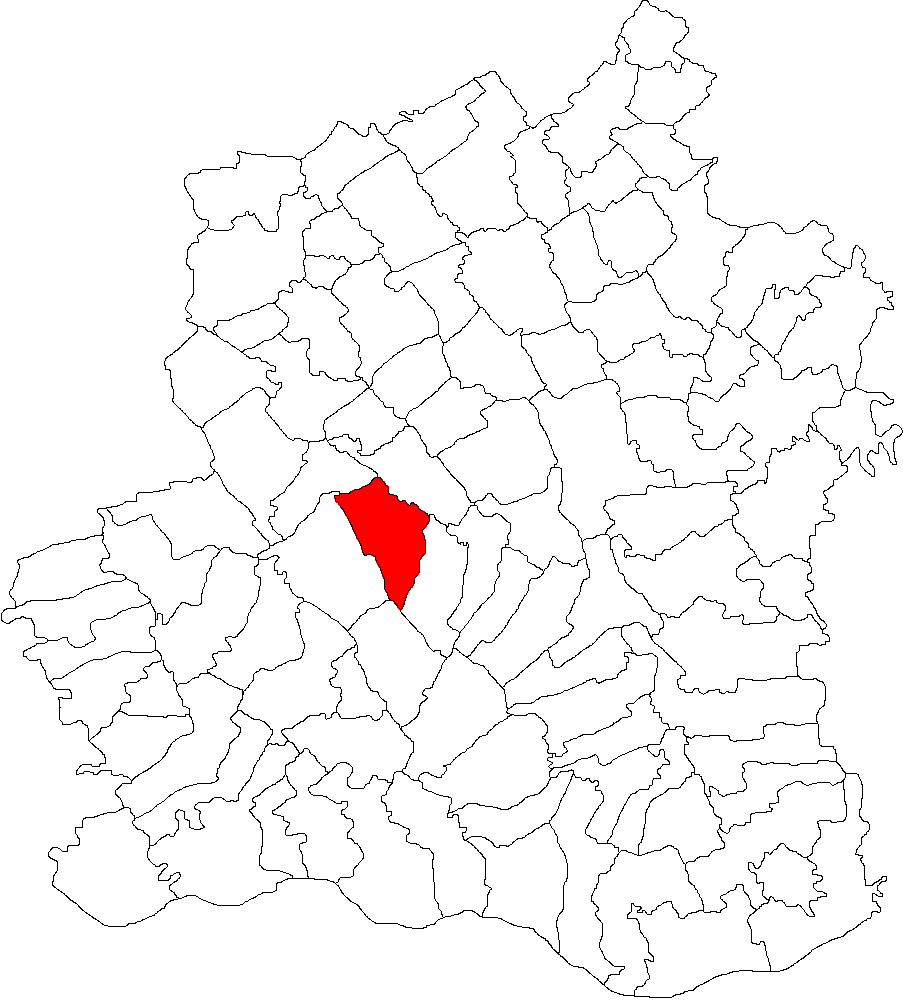
- Location in Teleorman County

- Location in Romania
- Coordinates: 44°03′N 25°05′E
- Country: Romania
- County: Teleorman

Government
  - Mayor (2020–2024): Mihai Soreață (PSD)
- Area: 54.16 km^{2} (20.91 sq mi)
- Population (2021-12-01): 6,090
  - Density: 112/km^{2} (291/sq mi)
- Time zone: UTC+02:00 (EET)
  - Summer (DST): UTC+03:00 (EEST)
- Postal code: 147240
- Vehicle reg.: TR
- Website: comunaperetu.ro

Peretu is a commune in Teleorman County, Muntenia, Romania. It is composed of a single village, Peretu.

The commune is situated in the Wallachian Plain, 11 km (6.8 mi) southeast of Roșiorii de Vede and 21 km (13 mi) northwest of the county seat, Alexandria.

== See also ==
- Helmet of Peretu
