= Valea Nucarilor =

- Commune
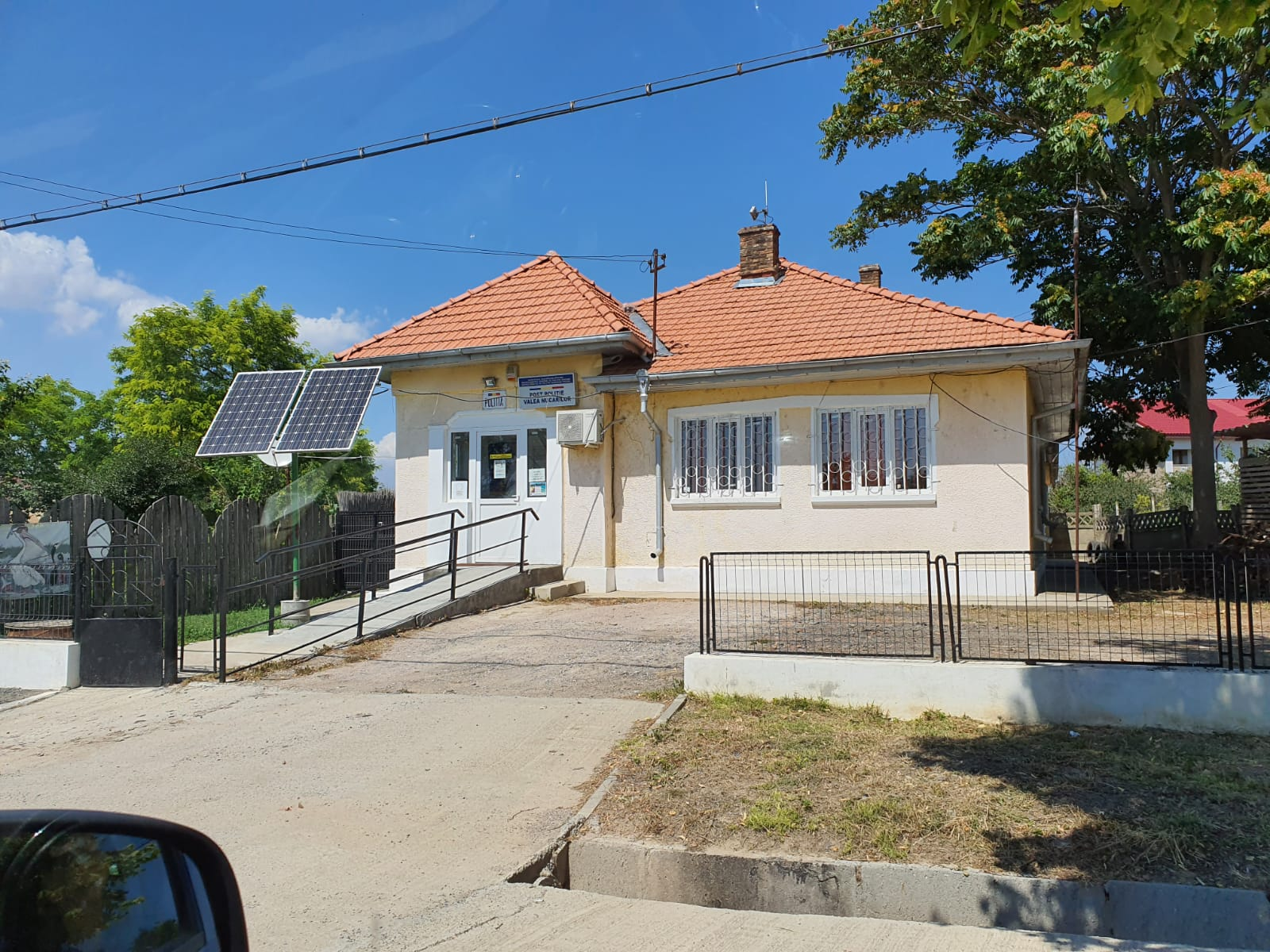
- Police station in Valea Nucarilor

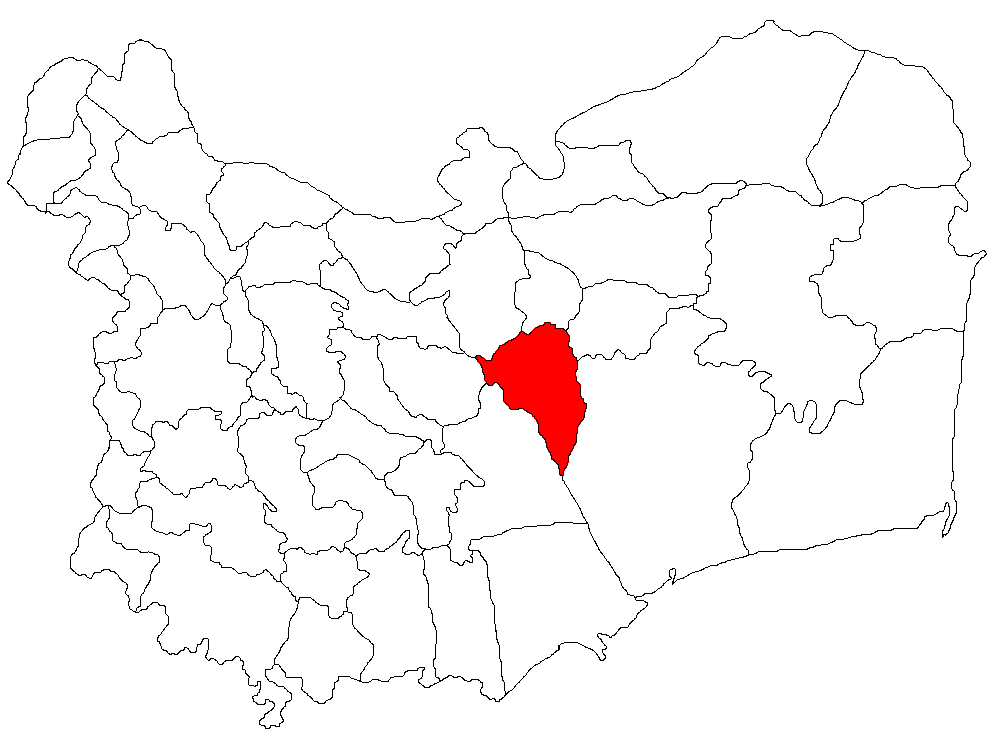
- Location in Tulcea County

- Location in Romania
- Coordinates: 45°02′N 28°56′E
- Country: Romania
- County: Tulcea
- Subdivisions: Aghighiol, Iazurile, Valea Nucarilor

Government
  - Mayor (2020–2024): Maria Lența (PSD)
- Area: 155.06 km^{2} (59.87 sq mi)
- Elevation: 16 m (52 ft)
- Population (2021-12-01): 2,892
  - Density: 18.65/km^{2} (48.31/sq mi)
- Time zone: UTC+02:00 (EET)
  - Summer (DST): UTC+03:00 (EEST)
- Postal code: 827235
- Area code: +(40) 240
- Vehicle reg.: TL
- Website: www.valeanucarilor.ro

Valea Nucarilor is a commune in Tulcea County, Northern Dobruja, Romania. It is composed of three villages: Agighiol, Iazurile (formerly Calica), and Valea Nucarilor (formerly Sarighiol de Vale, and Ion Gheorghe Duca).

Historical population
Year	Pop.	±%
2002	3,976	—
2011	3,266	−17.9%
2021	2,892	−11.5%
Source: Census data

== See also ==
- Helmet of Agighiol
