= Helmet of Peretu =

4th-century BC Geto-Dacian silver helmet

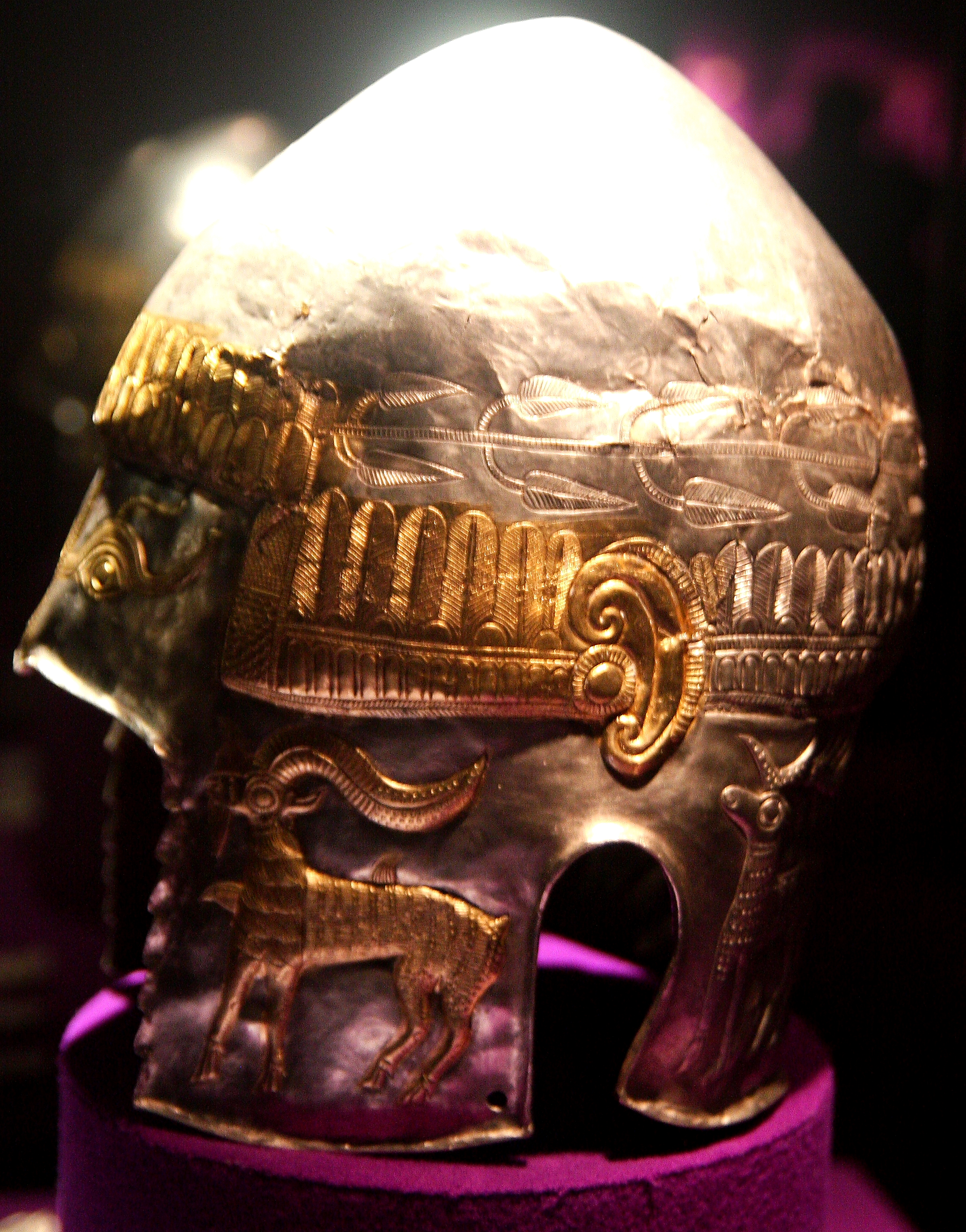
- Created: 4th century BC
- Discovered: 1971; Teleorman, Romania
- Present location: Bucharest, Romania

The Helmet of Peretu (Romanian: Coiful de la Peretu) is a Geto-Dacian silver helmet dating from the 4th century BC, housed in the National Museum of Romanian History, Bucharest. It comes from the Peretu area, in the Teleorman County, Romania. There were 57 artifacts made of silver and bronze weighing in total 2585g. The helmet is similar to the Helmet of Coţofeneşti and other three Getian gold or silver helmets discovered so far.

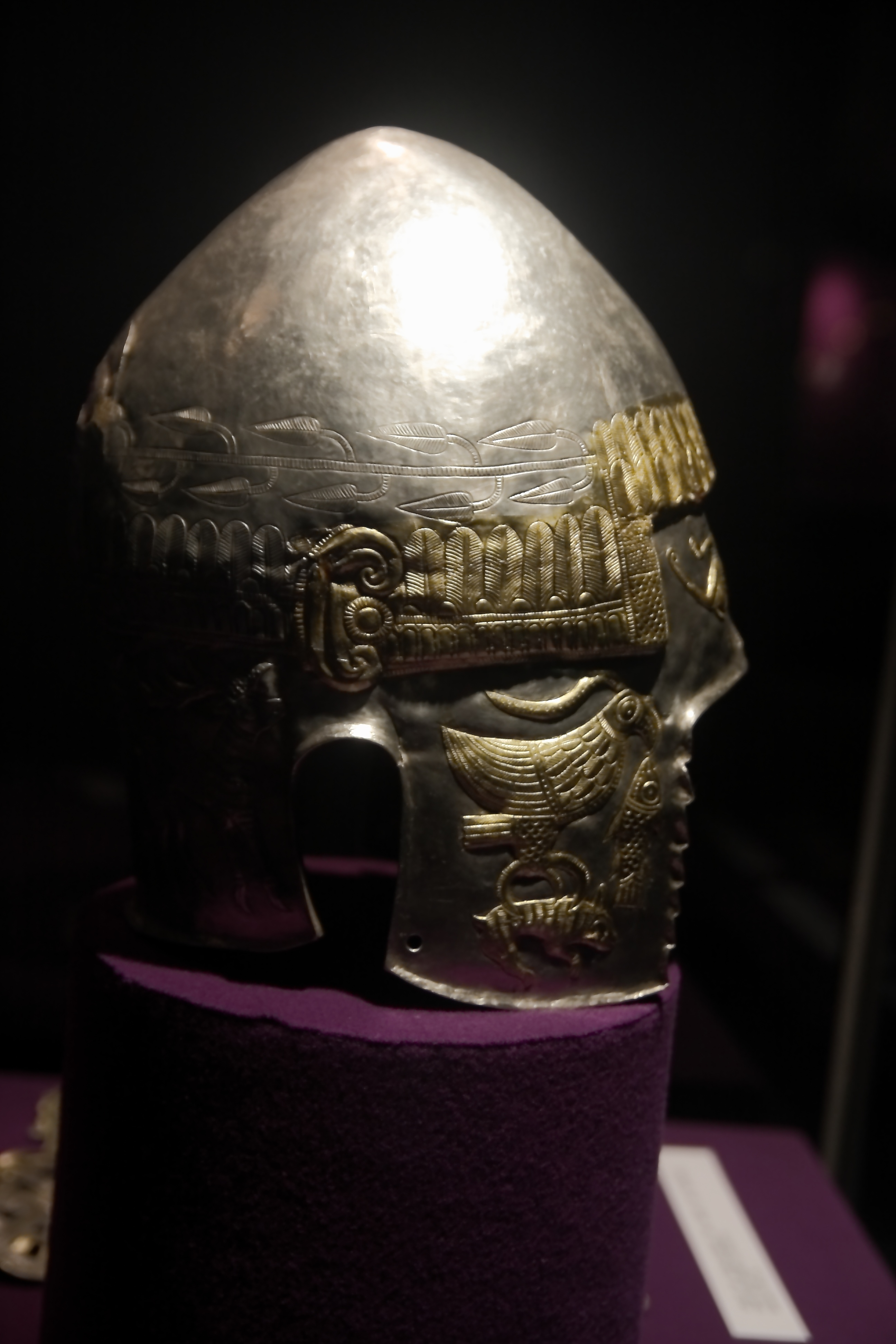

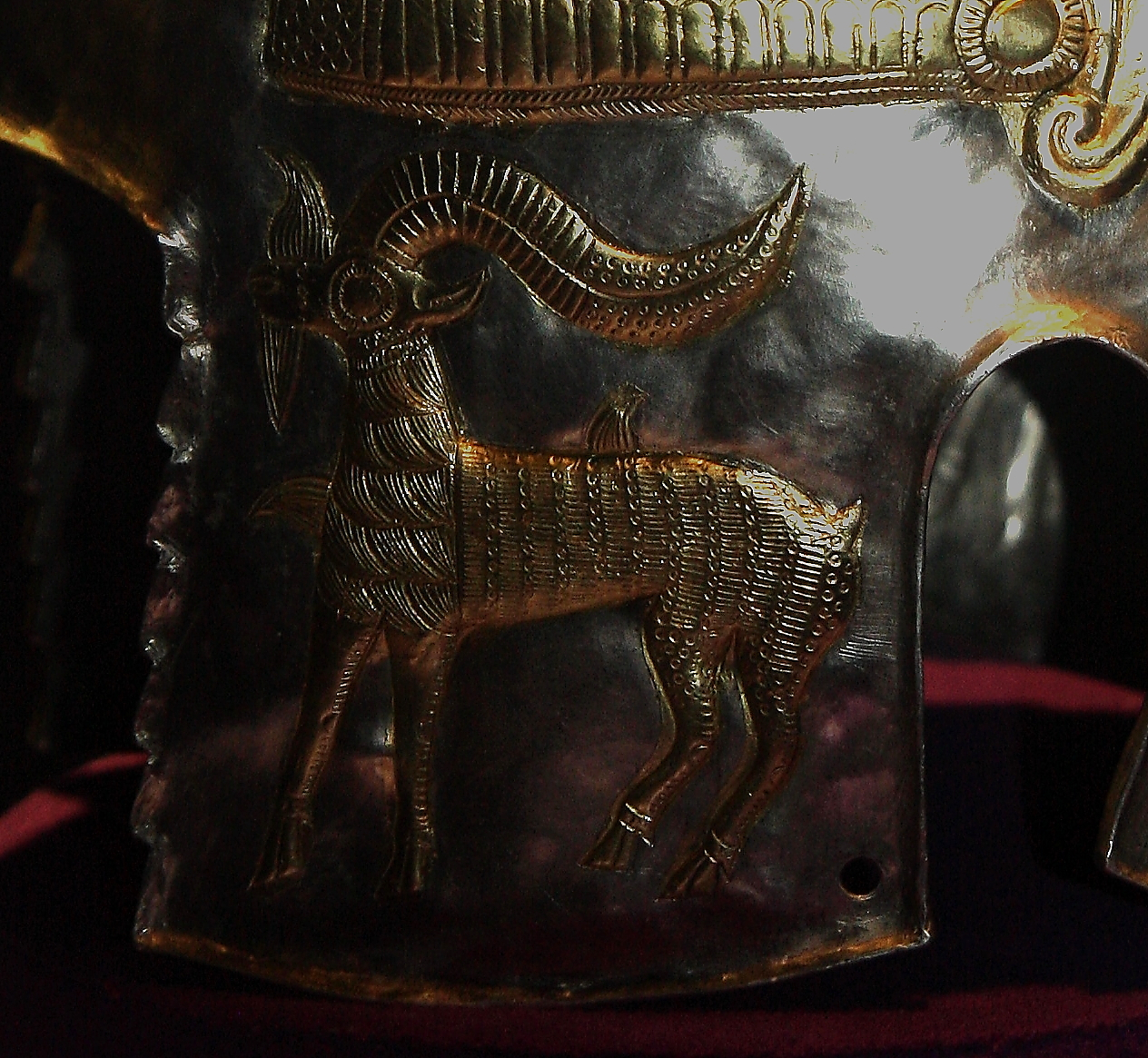

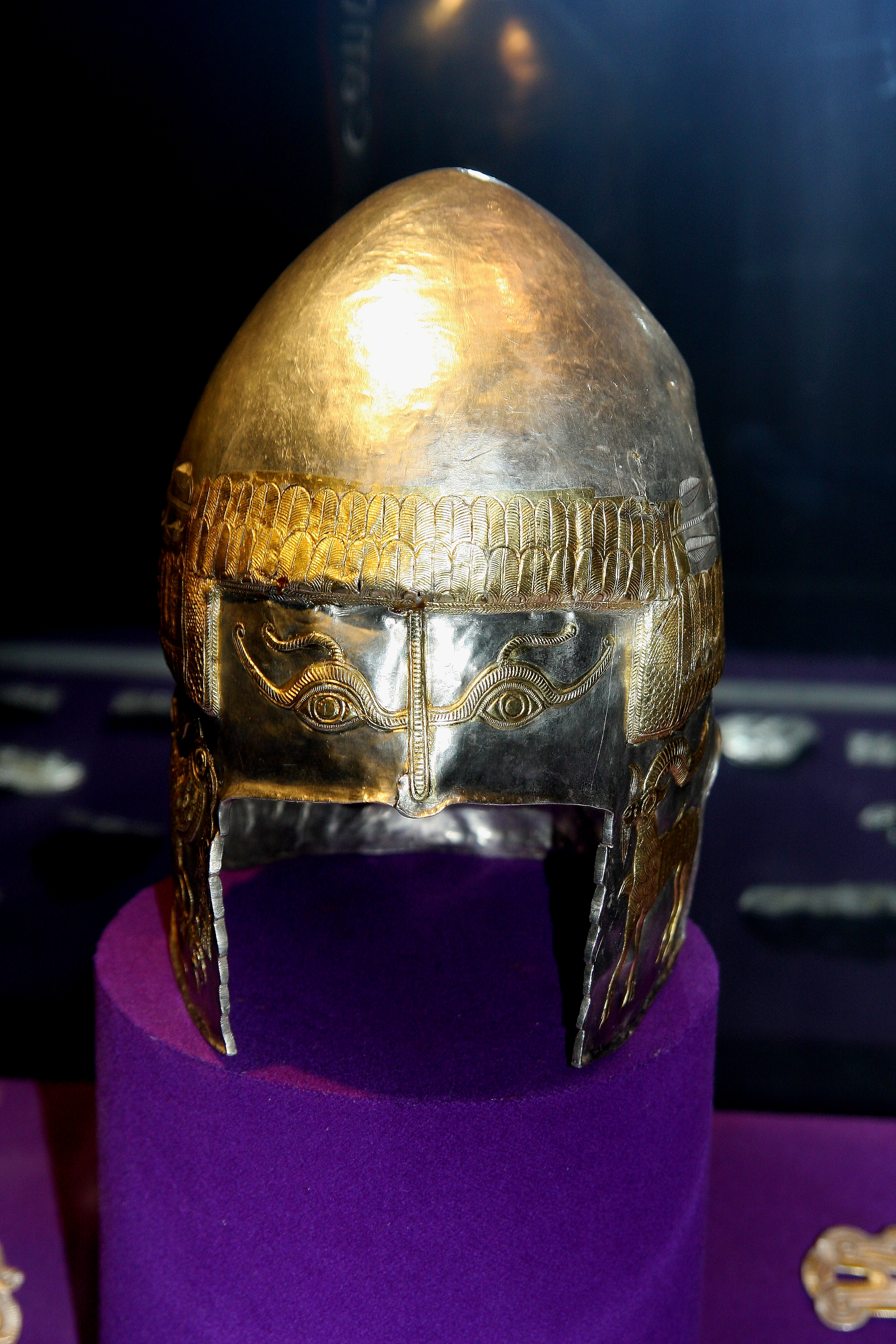

== See also ==
- Getae
