= Helmet of Agighiol =

4th century Romanian silver helmet

- Coiful de la Agighiol
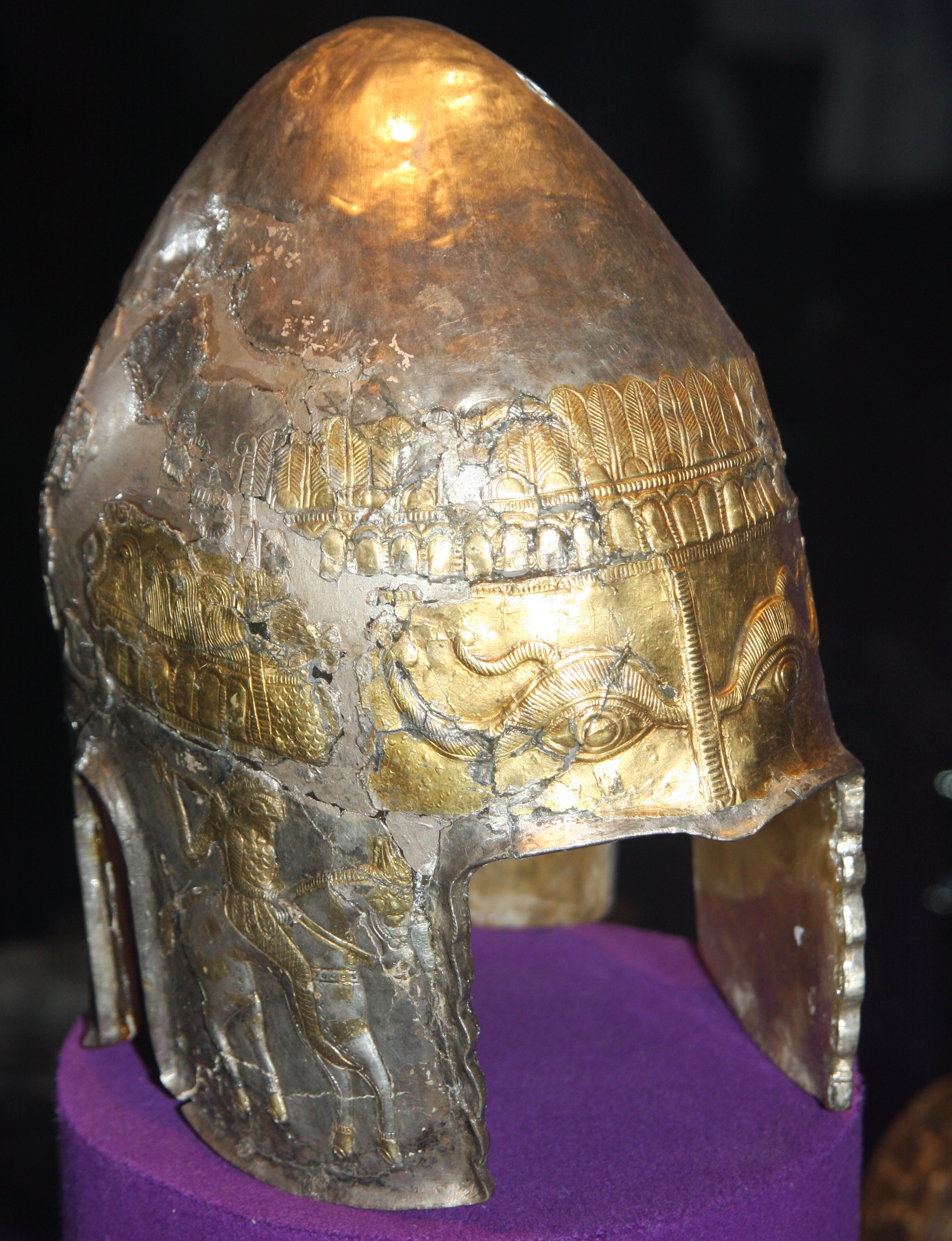
- Material: Silver
- Created: 4th century BC
- Discovered: 1931; Agighiol, Tulcea County, Kingdom of Romania
- Present location: Bucharest, Romania

The Helmet of Agighiol (Romanian: Coiful de la Agighiol) is a Getae silver helmet dating from the 4th century BC, housed in the National Museum of Romanian History, Bucharest.

It comes from the Agighiol area, in Tulcea County, Romania.

The helmet is similar to the Helmet of Coțofenești and other three Getian gold or silver helmets discovered so far. Its decoration includes males mounted on horses in scale armour. Its form is inspired the northern Balkan variant of the bronze Chalcidian helmet.

== See also ==
- Getae
