= 2019 in Romania =

- Decades: 1990s; 2000s; 2010s; 2020s
- See also: Other events of 2019; History of Romania; Timeline of Romanian history; Years in Romania

Events of 2019 in Romania.

== Incumbents ==
- President: Klaus Iohannis
- Prime Minister: Viorica Dăncilă (until 4 November) · Ludovic Orban (since 4 November)
- President of the Senate: Călin Popescu-Tăriceanu (until 2 September) · Teodor Meleșcanu (since 10 September)
- President of the Chamber of Deputies: Liviu Dragnea (until 27 May) · Marcel Ciolacu (since 29 May)

== Events ==
=== January ===
- 1 January – Start of the 2019 Romanian Presidency of the Council of the European Union.

=== May ===
- 26 May
  - 2019 European Parliament election in Romania: The biggest opposition party – PNL – wins the vote in the country while the new opposition alliance made of USR and PLUS wins the vote in the big cities and diaspora. The senior ruling party – PSD – gets a score of under 24%, down from 37.6% in the previous election. Their coalition partners from ALDE drop under the 5% threshold.
  - The referendum against judicial amnesties reaches the required turnout to be valid.
- 27 May – The High Court of Cassation and Justice upholds the ruling sentencing Liviu Dragnea, leader of the governing PSD, for three and a half years in jail for of his involvement in the hiring of two fictitious workers in his electoral stronghold.
- 29 May – The Chamber of Deputies plenary elects Social Democrat Marcel Ciolacu as its President.

=== June ===
- 30 June – End of the 2019 Romanian Presidency of the Council of the European Union.

=== August ===
- 26 August – ALDE decides to leave the ruling coalition and join the opposition. As a result, three of its four ministers resign.

=== September ===
- 2 September – Călin Popescu-Tăriceanu resigns as President of the Senate.
- 10 September – Teodor Meleșcanu is elected President of the Senate with 73 votes against PNL candidate Alina Gorghiu.

=== October ===
- 10 October – Dăncilă Cabinet collapses after losing a no-confidence vote.

=== November ===
- 4 November – PNL leader Ludovic Orban is voted in as the new Prime Minister of Romania. PSD and PRO Romania officially boycott the vote.

== Deaths ==
=== January ===
- 5 January – Emil Brumaru, writer and poet (b. 1938)
- 8 January – Cornel Trăilescu, conductor and composer (b. 1926)
- 20 January – Petre Milincovici, 82, Romanian Olympic rower (1960).
- 27 January – Henry Chapier, 85, Romanian-born French journalist and film critic.

=== February ===
- 3 February – Stephen Negoesco, 93, Romanian-American Hall of Fame soccer player and manager.

=== March ===
- 5 March – Doru Popovici, composer, musicologist, writer and journalist.
- 10 March – Gheorghe Naghi, director and actor (Telegrame).
- 18 March – Egon Balas, 96, Romanian mathematician.
- 20 March – Leonard Wolf, 96, Romanian-born American poet.
- 23 March – Tudor Caranfil, 87, Romanian film critic, TV producer and film historian.
- 24 March – Cornelia Tăutu, composer (b. 1938)

=== April ===
- 1 April – Vladimir Orloff, 90, Romanian-Canadian cellist and music teacher.
- 8 April – Josine Ianco-Starrels, 92, Romanian-born American art curator.
- 16 April – Valentin Plătăreanu, 82, Romanian actor and director.

=== May ===
- 20 May – Remus Opriș, 60, Romanian politician, MP (1992–2000).
- 25 May – Nicolae Pescaru, 76, Romanian footballer (Brașov, national team).

=== June ===
- 7 June – Elisabeta Ionescu, 66, Romanian Olympic handball player, world championship silver medalist (1973).
- 18 June – Pavel Chihaia, 97, Romanian novelist and political dissident.
- 20 June –
  - Dumitru Focșeneanu, 83, Romanian Olympic bobsledder (1972), stroke.
  - Alexa Mezincescu, 82, Romanian ballet dancer and choreographer.

=== July ===
- 4 July – Eva Mozes Kor, 85, Romanian-born American Holocaust survivor and author, founder of CANDLES Holocaust Museum and Education Center.
- 25 July – Mihai Mandache, 58, Romanian Olympic swimmer (1980).
- 29 July – Traian Ivănescu, 86, Romanian football player and coach.
- 30 July – Marcian Bleahu, 95, Romanian geologist, writer and politician, Senator (1990–1992, 1996–2000) and Minister of the Environment (1991–1992).

=== August ===
- 1 August – Puși Dinulescu, 76, Romanian playwright and film director, heart attack.
- 3 August – Marcel Toader, 56, Romanian rugby union player (Steaua București, national team), heart attack.
- 8 August – Marius Todericiu, 49, Romanian football player (Brașov, Weismain) and manager (Darmstadt 98), suicide.
- 12 August – Florin Halagian, 80, Romanian football player (Dinamo București) and manager (Argeș Pitești, national team).

=== September ===
- 7 September – Sava Dumitrescu, pharmacologist (b. 1927)
- 18 September – Alexandru Darie, 60, Romanian theater director.

=== October ===
- 15 October – Tamara Buciuceanu, 90, Romanian actress (Silent Wedding, Everybody in Our Family), heart disease.
- 29 October – Mihai Constantinescu, singer

=== November ===
- 2 November – Leo Iorga, 54, Romanian rock singer and guitarist, lung cancer.
- 3 November – Sorin Frunzăverde, 59, Romanian politician, MP (2007–2009) and Minister of National Defence (2000, 2006–2007), kidney disease.
- 5 November – Larion Serghei, 67, Romanian sprint canoer, Olympic bronze medalist (1976).
- 16 November – Bogdan Niculescu-Duvăz, 69, Romanian politician, MP (1990–2016).
- 20 November – Dorel Zugrăvescu, 88, Romanian geophysicist.

=== December ===
- 23 December – Georgeta Snegur, 82, Romanian-born Moldovan socialite, First Lady (1990–1997).

== See also ==
- 2019 in the European Union
- Romania in the Eurovision Song Contest 2019
