= 1932 in Romania =

- Decades: 1910s; 1920s; 1930s; 1940s; 1950s
- See also: Other events of 1932; History of Romania; Timeline of Romanian history; Years in Romania

Events from the year 1932 in Romania. The year saw the birth of two future Woman Grandmasters, Maria Albuleț and Margareta Teodorescu.

== Incumbents ==
- King: Carol II.
- Prime Minister:
  - Nicolae Iorga (Until 6 June)
  - Alexandru Vaida-Voevod (Between 6 June and 19 October)
  - Iuliu Maniu (from 20 October)

== Events ==
- 25 March – The far-right National Socialist Party (Partidul Național-Socialist din România, PNSR) is founded by Gheorghe Tătărescu.
- 26 March – The Iron Guard is declared illegal.
- 1 April – Cluj Airport is founded by the Romanian Ministry of Industry and Trade.
- 29 April – Carol II institutes the National Order of Faithful Service (Ordinul Național "Serviciul Credincios") as an order and decoration.
- 25 May – The Albanian Nationalistic newspaper Kosova is first published in Bucharest.
- 18 June –The Romanian Basketball Federation is one of the founders of the Fédération Internationale de Basket-Ball Amateur, which later becomes the International Basketball Federation (FIBA).
- 1 July – Petru Comarnescu convenes the first meeting of the Criterion learned society.
- 17 July – In the general election, the governing National Peasants' Party-German Party alliance wins 274 of the 387 seats in the Chamber of Deputies.
- Unknown – The aviation company Întreprinderea de Construcții Aeronautice Românești is founded.

== Births ==
- 12 April – Florin-Teodor Tănăsescu, electrical engineer.
- 13 April – Margareta Teodorescu, chess player, Woman Grandmaster in 1985 (died 2013).
- 15 April – Lia Manoliu, discus thrower, winner of gold at the 1968 Summer Olympics and bronze at the 1960 and 1964 games (died 1998).
- 24 April – Florin Pucă, graphic designer (died 1990).
- 10 June – Maria Albuleț, chess player, Woman Grandmaster in 1985 (died 2005).
- 9 July – Tatiana Nicolescu, historian of Romanian and Russian literature and translator.
- 19 July – Alexandru Moșanu, first President of the Parliament of Republic of Moldova and co-author of the Moldovan Declaration of Independence (died 2017).
- 1 October – Ioan-Iovitz Popescu, physicist and linguist, member of the Romanian Academy.
- 2 October – Valentin Poénaru, mathematician.

== Deaths ==
- 6 January – Iacob Negruzzi, poet (born 1842).
- 11 June – Maria Chefaliady-Taban, composer and pianist (born 1863).
- 14 June – Nicolae Vermont, graphic artist and muralist (born 1884).
- 14 July – Dimitrie Paciurea, sculptor (born 1873 or 1875).
- 15 August – Traian Moșoiu, general during World War I and the Hungarian–Romanian War, Minister of War in 1919–1920 (born 1868).
