= 1929 in Romania =

- Decades: 1900s; 1910s; 1920s; 1930s; 1940s
- See also: Other events of 1929; History of Romania; Timeline of Romanian history; Years in Romania

Events from the year 1929 in Romania. The year was dominated by the Great Depression. Romania signed the Litvinov Protocol and the national football team won the first match of the Balkan Cup, held this year.

== Incumbents ==
- King: Michael I.
- Prime Minister: Iuliu Maniu

== Events ==
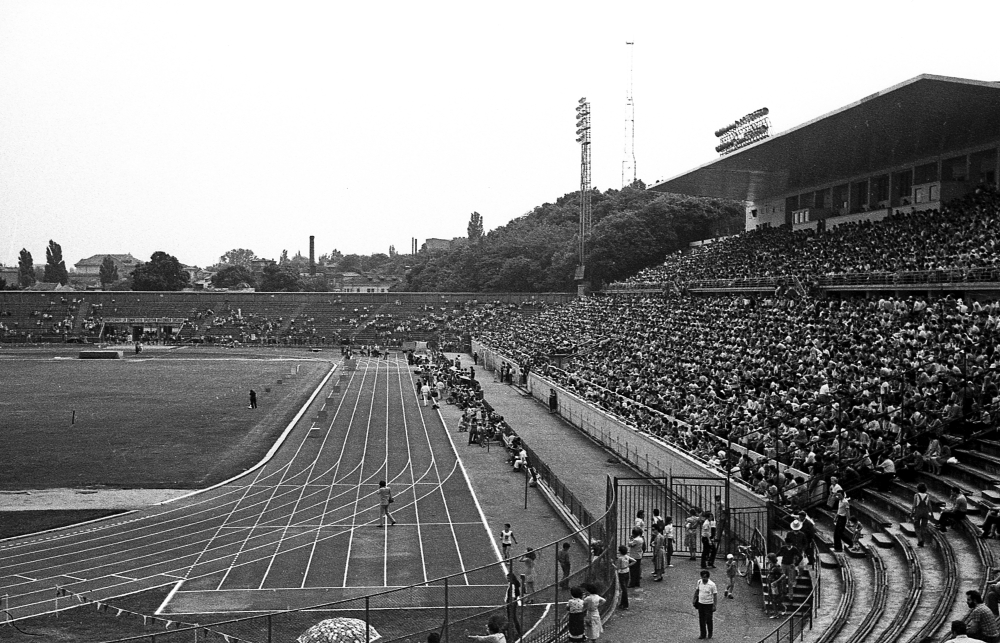
Stadionul Oficiul Național de Educație Fizică, location of the Romania's victory at the inaugural Balkan Cup

- 12 January – The Romanian Radio Broadcasting Company broadcasts its first program for children, Children's Hour (Ora copiilor).
- 7 February – The Monetary Act lays down the gold standard for the Romanian leu.
- 30 March – Romania signs the Litvinov Protocol.
- 11 May – The first Balkan Cup is initiated with Romania a founding competitor.
- July – Increasing price shocks and a dramatic economic downturn lead to Romania formally entering the Great Depression.
- 17 August – The League Against Usury, a single-issue party founded in response to the Great Depression.
- 6 October – The national football team wins the first match of the Balkan Cup at Stadionul Oficiul Național de Educație Fizică in Bucharest. The team goes on to win the cup.

== Births ==
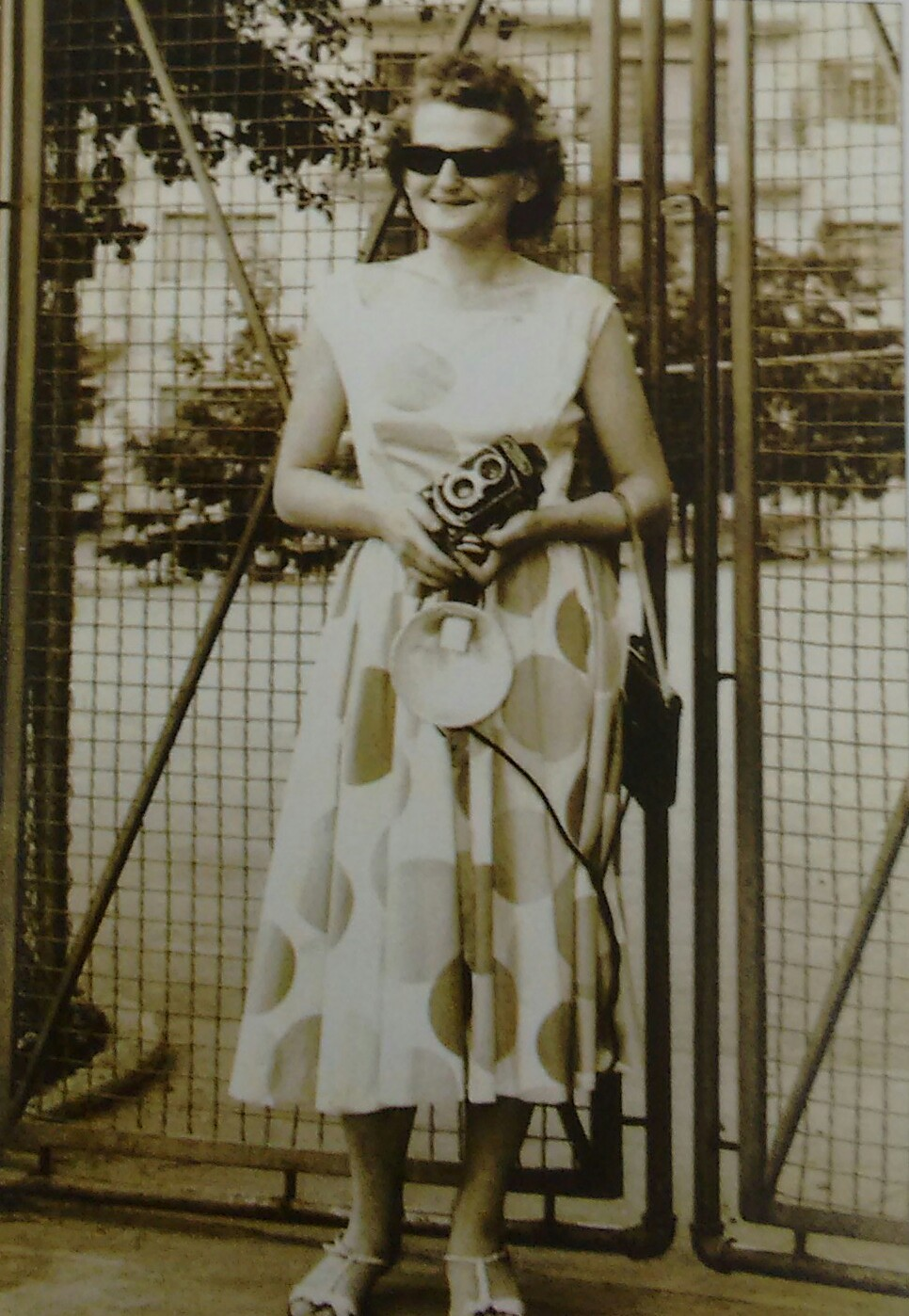
Thea Segall in 1956

- 1 January – Nicolae Linca, boxer, first Romanian to win an Olympic medal, at the 1956 Summer Olympics (died 2008).
- 11 February – Paul Barbă Neagră, film director (died 2009).
- 24 February – Marga Barbu, actress (died 2009).
- 14 March – Iurie Darie, actor (died 2012).
- 18 March – Meinhard E. Mayer, mathematician (died 2011).
- 13 May – Thea Segall, photographer (died 2009).
- 30 May – Doina Cornea, human rights activist and French language professor (died 2018).
- 17 July – Márton Balázs, mathematician (died 2016).
- 10 August – Tamara Buciuceanu, actress (died 2019).
- 19 August – Ion N. Petrovici, neurologist and academic (died 2021).
- 22 September – Dinu Cocea, actor, film director, and screenwriter (died 2013).
- 6 October – Mihai Drăgănescu, engineer and President of the Romanian Academy from 1990 to 1994 (died 2010).
- 10 October – Mihai Gavrilă, quantum physicist and a corresponding member of the Romanian Academy.
- 9 November – Edith Balas, art historian (died 2016).

== Deaths ==
- 29 March – Elena Caragiani-Stoenescu, first Romanian woman aviator (born 1887).
- 29 July – Clara Maniu, feminist and suffragist (born 1842).
- 17 August – Haia Lifșiț, Communist activist (born 1903).
- 10 October – Ștefan Protopopescu, aviation pioneer, the first licensed pilot in Romania (born 1883).
