= 1928 in Romania =

- Decades: 1900s; 1910s; 1920s; 1930s; 1940s
- See also: Other events of 1928; History of Romania; Timeline of Romanian history; Years in Romania

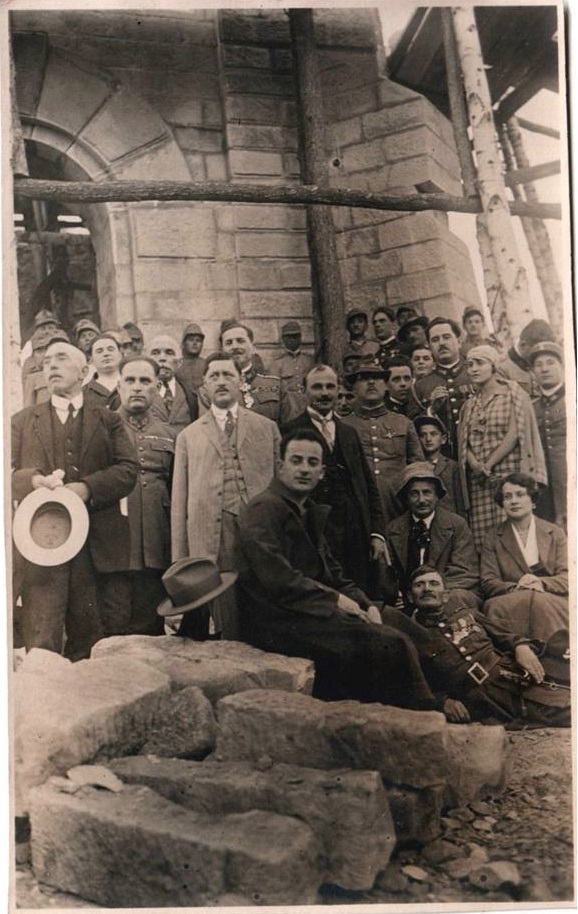

Events from the year 1928 in Romania. The year was dominated by the Great Depression in Romania. It also saw the first radio transmission in the country.

== Incumbents ==
- King: Michael I.
- Prime Minister:
  - Vintilă Brătianu (until 9 November)
  - Iuliu Maniu (from 10 November)

== Events ==
- 4 February – Romania enacts legislation to limit the trafficking and use of cannabis and narcotic drugs.
- 15 July – The Socialist Workers Party of Romania, (Romanian: Partidul Socialist al Muncitorilor din România, PSMR) is founded.
- 29 July – The newspaper Proletarul (Proletarian) is founded.
- 1 November – The Romanian Radio Broadcasting Company broadcasts for the first time.
- 9 November – The government of Vintilă I. C. Brătianu is replaced by the first cabinet of Iuliu Maniu that takes over the following day.
- 12 December – In the general election, the National Peasants' Party retains power.
- Unknown – The first Romanian Girl Guide groups are formed. There are none left after ten years.

== Births ==
- 19 February – Cabiria Andreian Cazacu, mathematician (died 2018).
- 16 April – Radu Ciuceanu, historian and politician (died 2022).
- 18 May – Zlata Tkach, composer (died 2006).
- 26 July – Constantin Corduneanu, mathematician (died 2018).
- 30 September – Elie Wiesel, Nobel Prize laureate (died 2016).
- 3 November – Ion Dincă, politician and Mayor of Bucharest (died 2007).
- 11 November – Mircea Mureșan, film director (died 2020).

== Deaths ==
- 24 May – Constantin Hârjeu, engineer (born 1856).
- 29 December – Adele Zay, feminist and pedagogue (born 1848).
