= 1930 in Romania =

- Decades: 1910s; 1920s; 1930s; 1940s; 1950s
- See also: Other events of 1930; History of Romania; Timeline of Romanian history; Years in Romania

Events from the year 1930 in Romania. The reign of Carol II started during the year, which also saw the foundation of the Iron Guard. The first local election in which women could vote and the only census of Greater Romania were also held during the year.

== Incumbents ==
- King:
  - Michael I (until 8 June).
  - Carol II (from 8 June).
- Prime Minister:
  - Iuliu Maniu (until 6 June and from 13 June to 9 October)
  - Gheorghe Mironescu (from 7 to 12 June and from 10 October)

== Events ==
- 5 February – Women vote for the first time in Romanian elections.
- 3 March – The Romanian Society of Geology is founded with Ludovic Mrazek as president.
- 13 April – Corneliu Zelea Codreanu forms the Iron Guard out of the far right Legion of the Archangel Michael as a larger paramilitary organisation.
- 18 April – 118 people die in the Costești wooden church fire.
- 5 June – The papal bull Solemni conventione defines the boundaries of the Catholic Church in Romania,
- 8 June – In a coup d'état by parliament, King Carol II takes the throne.
- 15 June – The National Liberal Party–Brătianu led by Gheorghe I. Brătianu is founded.
- 9 July – SNNA (Serviciul Național de Navigație Aeriană, The National Air Navigation Service) becomes LANES (Liniile Aeriene Române Exploatate de Stat, Romanian State-Operated Air Lines) representing its status as a state enterprise.
- 30 July – The Order of Aeronautical Virtue is established as a military order.
- 29 December – The first and only census of Greater Romania reports that the population is 18,057,028, of which 28% are non-Romanian.

== Births ==
- 6 February – Richard M. Weiner, theoretical physicist (died 2020).
- 3 March – Ion Iliescu, President of Romania from 1989 to 1996 and from 2000 to 2004.
- 14 March – Irma Glicman Adelman, economist (died 2017).
- 26 April – Oliviu Gherman, physicist, politician, and diplomat (died 2020).
- 5 July – Georgeta Pitică, table tennis player (died 2018).
- 13 July – Simion Ismailciuc, sprint canoeist, who won gold in the 1956 Summer Olympics (died 1986).
- 19 December – Anca Giurchescu, ethnochoreologist and researcher in folk dance (died 2015).

== Deaths ==
- 16 September – Vintilă Brătianu, Prime Minister of Romania between 1927 and 1928 (born 1867).
- 17 December – Olga Fialka, artist (born 1848).
