= 1937 in Romania =

- Decades: 1910s; 1920s; 1930s; 1940s; 1950s
- See also: Other events of 1937; History of Romania; Timeline of Romanian history; Years in Romania

Events from the year 1937 in Romania. The year saw the installation of the antisemitic government of Octavian Goga.

== Incumbents ==
- King: Carol II.
- Prime Minister:
  - Gheorghe Tătărescu (until 29 December).
  - Octavian Goga (after 29 December).

== Events ==
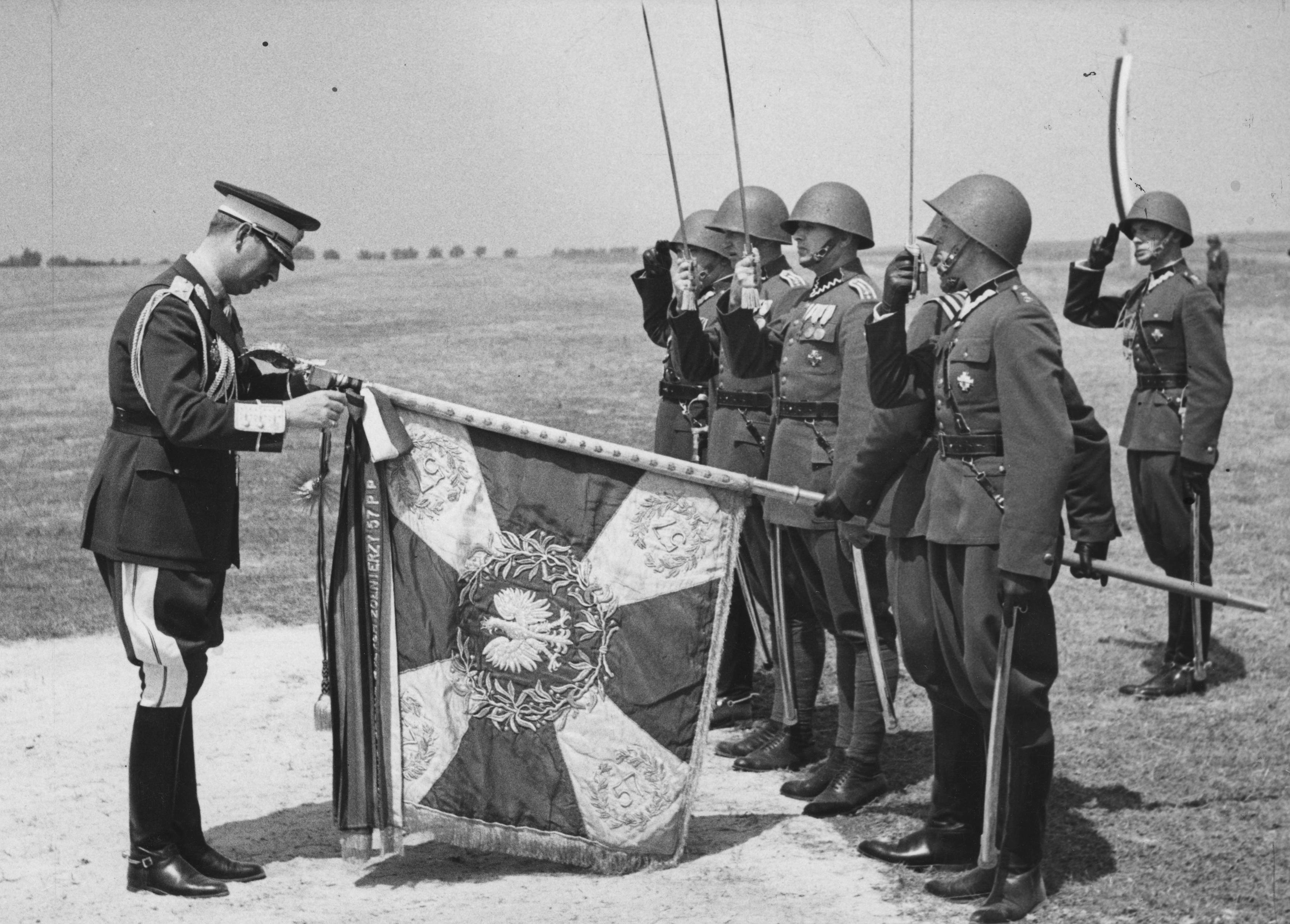
King Carol II decorates a Polish regiment's standard during his visit to the country on 28 June 1937

- 13 February – The funerals of Ion Moța and Vasile Marin take place in Bucharest.
- 11 March – Nicolae Bălan's report to the Romanian Orthodox Church leads to Freemasonry in Romania dissolving itself.
- 20 March – The government affirms its obligations to the League of Nations and Little Entente in preference to closer ties to Nazi Germany.
- 26 June – Carol II begins a four-day visit to Poland cementing the Polish–Romanian alliance.
- 7 December – Frederick, Prince of Hohenzollern and cousin to the king, states to the German ambassador Wilhelm Fabricius that Romania sees no alliance between France and the Little Entente.
- 20 December – A general election is held for the Chamber of Deputies. The National Liberal Party remains the largest party in government but the King requests Octavian Goga to form a government.
- 29 December – Goga forms a new government which pursues anti-semitic policies, issuing in the first short-lived period of fascism in the kingdom.
- 30 December – The final round of the Senate election is held, the last elections before women's suffrage is introduced.

== Births ==
- 19 March – Eduard Prugovečki, physicist and mathematician (died 2003).
- 10 May – Tamara Hareven, social historian (died 2002).
- 23 May – Irina Odagescu, composer.
- 20 July – Ilie Datcu, footballer (died 2026).
- 17 September – Ilarion Ionescu-Galați, Romanian violinist vand conductor.
- 22 September – Nicolae Popescu, mathematician (died 2010).
- 16 November – Maria Diaconescu, javelin thrower.

== Deaths ==
- 7 May – George Topîrceanu, war poet and satirist (born 1886).
- 12 August – Alexandru Stănescu (pen name Alexandru Sahia), journalist and short story writer (born 1908).
- 17 December – Dimitrie Călugăreanu, naturalist, physiologist and physician (born 1868).
