= 1931 in Romania =

- Decades: 1910s; 1920s; 1930s; 1940s; 1950s
- See also: Other events of 1931; History of Romania; Timeline of Romanian history; Years in Romania

Events from the year 1931 in Romania. The year was dominated by the Great Depression.

== Incumbents ==
- King: Carol II.
- Prime Minister:
  - Gheorghe Mironescu (until 17 April)
  - Nicolae Iorga (from 18 April)

== Events ==
- 11 January – The government dissolves the far-right Iron Guard.
- 4 May – The right-wing Jewish Party, is founded.
- 1 June – In a general election, the National Union, an alliance of the National Party, the National Liberal Party, the German Party, the Agrarian Union Party, the Vlad Ţepeş League, the Agrarian League and several other parties wins 49% of the vote.
- 17 July – The Royal Academy of Music and Dramatic Art (Academia Regală de Muzică şi Artă Dramatică) is founded, which will later become the National University of Music Bucharest.
- 15 August – The newspaper of the Communist Party, Scânteia, is first printed.
- 22 October – The failure of the Marmorosch Blank Bank, which followed the collapse of Banca Generala a Tarii Romanesti in June and Banca Bercovitz in July, triggers the peak of the Great Depression in Romania.
- Unknown – The Romanian Basketball and Volleyball Federation (Federația Română de Baschet și Volei) is founded, which becomes the Romanian Basketball Federation (Federatia Română de Baschet).

== Births ==
- 1 January – Sabetai Unguru, historian of mathematics and science at Tel Aviv University (died 2024).
- 4 January – Nora Iuga, poet, writer and translator.
- 24 January – Maria Piątkowska, sprinter, hurdler, and long jumper, who competed in the 1952, 1960 and 1964 Olympics for Poland (died 2020).
- 26 January – Felicia Donceanu, painter, sculptor, and composer (died 2022).
- 13 February – Eva Heyman, diarist murdered in the Auschwitz concentration camp in 1944.
- 1 March – Elisabeta Bostan, film director and screenwriter.
- 2 April – Alexandru Balaban, chemist and member of the Romanian Academy.
- 23 May – Lucian Mureșan, Major Archbishop of the Greek Catholic Archdiocese of Făgăraș and Alba Iulia and a cardinal of the Catholic Church.
- 1 June – Petru Mocanu, mathematician and member of the Romanian Academy (died 2016).
- 9 July – Tatiana Nicolescu, historian of Romanian and Russian literature and translator.
- 15 October – Eléna Wexler-Kreindler, mathematician (died 1992).
- 28 October – Ilarion Ciobanu, actor (died 2008).
- 9 December – Valeria Gagealov, film, radio, television, theater and voice actress (died 2021).

== Deaths ==
- 17 July – Nicolae Paulescu, physiologist, expert in diabetes and insulin (born 1869).
- 9 September – Matilda Cugler-Poni, poet (born 1851).
