= Technical Sciences Academy of Romania =

The Technical Sciences Academy of Romania was created on 17 October 1997, when its 27 founding members decided to revive the former Romanian Academy of Sciences, which had been disestablished in 1948, being merged into the Academy of the Romanian Popular Republic.

== Short history ==
On 11 December 1997, by its court decision Nr. 1218 the Bucharest Tribunal registered the creation of the Academy and its bylaws.

On 11 December 1997, by its court decision Nr. 1218 the Bucharest Tribunal registered the creation of the Academy and its bylaws. The first bylaws of the Academy were drafted by Radu Voinea, Florin Teodor Tănăsescu, Mihai Mihăiță and Mircea Stelin Petrescu, The Decision of the Romanian Government No. 807/21.06.2006, recognized ASTR as an organization of public utility.

In 2008, the Romanian Parliament discussed the functions of the Technical Sciences Academy of Romania, elevating it to national forum of scientific consecration of personalities in the field of engineering, of debates and initiatives for the promotion and development of research, technical creation and engineering education, by an appropriate change in the academy's purpose. The law was discussed and approved by the Chamber of Deputies of the Romanian Parliament on 8 October 2008, and was promulgated by the President of Romania on 30 October 2008.

Based on Law No. 230/2008, as well as on its previous bylaws and on the experience gained during 12 years of activity, new bylaws of the academy were drafted. The new bylaws were approved by the General Assembly of the Technical Sciences Academy of Romania on 23 June 2009. At the same time the new leadership of the academy was elected and the creation of the academy's branches and sections was approved.

In October 2006, ASTR became member of EURO – CASE European Council of Applied Sciences and Engineering.

== Founding members ==
The following scientists were the founding members of the Academy:

- Radu Voinea
- Aurelian Stan
- Marius Sabin Peculea
- Mihai Gafițanu
- Gheorghe Buzdugan
- Virgiliu Nicolae Constantinescu
- Panaite Mazilu
- Alexandru Balaban
- Horia Colan
- Aureliu Leca
- Mircea Stelin Petrescu
- Mircea Ivănescu
- Dan Ghiocel
- Toma Dordea
- Vasile Cătuneanu
- Gheorghe Silas
- Adelaida Mateescu
- Ioan Toma Alexandru Stănculescu
- Șerban Gheorghe Raicu
- Mihai Mihăiță
- Florin Teodor Tănăsescu
- Mircea Marinescu
- Tiberiu Dimitrie Babeu
- Dorel Zugrăvescu
- Oliviu Rusu

Other members include Nicolae Pandrea (ehgiheer), Nicolae Vasile and Michael Ghil.

== Sections ==
The activity of the academy takes places within the following section:

- Technical Mechanics
- Engineering Mechanics
- Electrotechnic and Energetic Engineering
- Electronics and Automatics
- Information and Communication Technology, Computers and Telecommunications
- Constructions and Urbanism
- Transportation Technology
- Chemical Engineering
- Materials Science and Engineering
- Petroleum and Mining Engineering, Geonomy
