= Drug policy of the Soviet Union =

The drug policy of the Soviet Union changed little throughout the existence of the state, other than slowly becoming more repressive, although some differences in penalties existed in the different Union Republics.

However, the prevalence of drug addiction remained reportedly low as first claimed by Soviet authorities which later (under Mikhail Gorbachev) acknowledged a much larger problem; at least to drugs other than alcohol or tobacco; however, the rates of addiction increased in post-Soviet states.

== Regulation ==
Legislation against drugs first appeared in post-revolutionary Russia, in Article 104-d of the 1922 penal code of the RSFSR, criminalising drug production, trafficking, and possession with intent to traffic. The 1924 Soviet Constitution expanded this legislation to cover the whole Soviet Union. The 1926 penal code of the RSFSR suggested imprisonment or corrective labour for between one and three years as punishment for these offences, depending on the scale of the offence committed. Drug possession without intention to traffic and the personal use of drugs warranted no penalties at this time.

Drug regulation remained largely untouched in the Soviet Union until 1974, when the Supreme Soviet issued a decree entitled 'On Reinforcement of the Fight Against Drug Addiction'. This decree was reproduced in Article 224 of the penal codes of all the republics of the USSR, and not only increased the penalties for the offences mentioned above to between ten and fifteen years' imprisonment, but for the first time criminalised possession of drugs without intent to traffic, bringing a penalty of up to three years in prison. Additional offences of 'seducing another person to narcotic drugs', punishable by up to five years' imprisonment, and the theft of narcotics, punishable by between five and fifteen years' imprisonment, were also created. The term 'narcotics' used here referred to all drugs listed by UN Conventions, not just opiates.

A further decree issued in 1987 made a conviction for the above offences within a year of an earlier conviction for the same violation of the law liable to punishment of up to two years' imprisonment or corrective labor. Sergei Lebedev, the Chairman of the Association of Independent Advocates in Leningrad at the time, argued that the steady escalation of criminal penalties for drug use was "indicative of the Soviet authorities' resignation to their complete inability to solve drug problems in a constructive and humane way".

== Treatment ==
Treatment was performed in various different ways depending on the substance the patient was addicted to: a physician would usually administer their drug of choice in small doses for maintenance, which was done to reduce the intensity of the withdrawal symptoms.

== See also ==
- Arguments for and against drug prohibition
  - Drug liberalization
  - Drug prohibition
- Crime in Russia
- Drug policy of Nazi Germany
- Drug policy of Portugal
- Drug policy of Romania
- Drug policy of Sweden
- Drug policy of the Netherlands
- Drug policy of the United States
- Drug prevention
- Drug rehabilitation
- Law enforcement in Russia
  - Federal Drug Control Service of Russia (FSKN)
  - Federal Security Service of Russia (FSB)
  - Main Directorate for Drugs Control (GUKON)
- Political abuse of psychiatry in the Soviet Union
- Recreational drug use
- Teetotalism
- Tobacco harm reduction

== Bibliography ==
- Neuhauser, Kimberly C. (1 January 1990). Grossman, Gregory; Treml, Vladimir G.; Gaddy, Clifford G. (eds.). The market for illegal drugs in the Soviet Union in the late 1980's (PDF). Berkeley-Duke occasional papers on the second economy in the USSR. Washington, D.C.: National Council for Eurasian and East European Research/Duke University.
