= Pleskow =

Pleskow is a surname. Notable people with the surname include:

- Eric Pleskow (1924–2019), Austrian-born American film producer
- Raoul Pleskow (1930–2022), Austrian-born American composer
