= List of Romanian films of 2008 =

== List ==
Premiere	Title	Director	Cast
22 February	Legiunea străină	Mircea Daneliuc	Oana Piecniță, Cătălin Paraschiv, Radu Iacoban
7 March	Restul e tăcere	Nae Caranfil	Marius Florea Vizante, Florin Zamfirescu, Ovidiu Niculescu, Mirela Zeța
14 March	Un acoperiș deasupra capului	Adrian Popovici	Mara Nicolescu, Gabriela Butuc
28 March	Cocoșul decapitat	Radu Gabrea	David Zimmerschied (Germania), Alicja Bachleda-Curuś (Polonia), Ioana Iacob, Axel Mustață
11 April	Supraviețuitorul	Sergiu Nicolaescu	Sergiu Nicolaescu, Vladimir Găitan, George Mihăiță, Jean Constantin
25 April	Poveste de cartier	Theodor Halacu-Nicon	Sorinel Copilul de Aur, Jean de la Craiova, Monica Merișan
4 May	Dincolo de America	Marius Barna	Daniela Nane, Mihai Stănescu
15 August	Mirrors	Alexandre Aja	Kiefer Sutherland, Aida Doina, Ioana Abur
5 September	Gruber's Journey	Radu Gabrea	Florin Piersic Jr., Marcel Iureş
19 September	Boogie (30 și ceva)	Radu Muntean	Dragoș Bucur, Anamaria Marinca
17 October	Schimb valutar	Nicolae Mărgineanu	Cosmin Seleși, Aliona Munteanu
17 November	Nunta mută	Horațiu Mălăele	Alexandru Potocean
	Luna verde	Alexa Visarion	Maia Morgenstern, Ana Ularu, Răzvan Vasilescu, Cătălina Mustață
	Tache	Igor Cobileanski	Mircea Diaconu

== See also ==
- 2008 in Romania
- List of 2008 box office number-one films in Romania
