= 1935 in Romania =

- Decades: 1910s; 1920s; 1930s; 1940s; 1950s
- See also: Other events of 1935; History of Romania; Timeline of Romanian history; Years in Romania

Events from the year 1935 in Romania. The year saw the foundation of the Romanian Academy of Sciences.

== Incumbents ==
- King: Carol II.
- Prime Minister: Gheorghe Tătărescu.

== Events ==
- 11 March – The Romanian Academy of Sciences is instituted.
- 29 March – The Romanian Front, a moderate fascist political party, is founded.
- 1 May – Proletarul, the newspaper of the Socialist Workers Party of Romania, ceases publishing.
- 16 July – The antisemitic and authoritarian National Christian Party is founded by the merger of the National Agrarian Party and the National-Christian Defense League.

== Births ==
- 5 January – Coleta de Sabata, engineer and rector of Politehnica University of Timișoara (died 2021).
- 11 April – Pnina Granirer, painter and writer.
- 24 April – Elisabeta Polihroniade, chess grandmaster (died 2016).
- 4 July – Atanasia Ionescu, artistic gymnast that won bronze at the 1960 Summer Olympics (died 1990).
- 18 July – Elena Săcălici, gymnast, member of the team that won the first Olympic and world team bronze medal for Romania, at the 1956 Summer Olympics (died 1959).
- 3 August – Maria Bieșu, opera singer (died 2012).
- 30 August – Alexandra Bellow, mathematician.
- 19 September – Elena Leușteanu, artistic gymnast that won three bronze medals in the 1956 and 1960 Summer Olympics (died 2008).
- 29 September – Sonia Iovan, artistic gymnast that won bronze medals in the 1956 and 1960 Summer Olympics.
- 2 October – Paul Goma, writer and dissident (died 2020).
- 17 October – Maria Vicol, foil fencer that won bronze medals in the 1960 and 1968 Summer Olympics.
- 7 December – Veronica Antal, professed member from the Secular Franciscan Order, the first Romanian woman to be beatified, on 22 September 2018 (died 1958).
- 21 December – Stela Popescu, TV and film actor.
- 26 December – Viorica Cortez, soprano.

== Deaths ==
- 24 January – Constantin Dumitrescu, major general in World War I and the Hungarian–Romanian War (born 1868).
- 16 April – Panait Istrati, writer (born 1884).
- 26 August – Sarmiza Bilcescu, the first woman to obtain law degree and the first Romanian woman to practice law (born 1867).
- 1 October – Grigore C. Crăiniceanu, divisional general during the Romanian War of Independence and World War I and Minister of War in 1909–1910 (born 1852).
- 23 November – Maria Cunțan, poet (born 1862).
