= Veronica Antal =

Romanian member of the Third order of Saint Francis

Blessed Veronica Antal OFS

Virgin and martyr
- Born: 7 December 1935; Nisiporești, Botești, Neamț County, Kingdom of Romania
- Died: 24 August 1958 (aged 22); Hălăucești, Iași County, Romanian People's Republic
- Cause of death: Stabbing
- Venerated in: Roman Catholic Church
- Beatified: 22 September 2018, Nisiporești, Romania by Cardinal Giovanni Angelo Becciu
- Feast: 24 August

Veronica Antal (7 December 1935 – 24 August 1958) was a Romanian Roman Catholic professed member from the Secular Franciscan Order and member of the Militia Immaculatae. Antal was known for her strong faith and her love for the Mother of God; she had long desired to enter the religious life as a nun but settled on the Secular Franciscans after the communist regime suppressed convents and monasteries in Romania. She has been titled as the "Maria Goretti of Romania" due to the manner of her death similar to that of Maria Goretti. Called the "Martyr of Chastity" by the townspeople, she was beatified by Pope Francis in 2018 — the first Romanian woman to become a beata.

== Life ==
Veronica Antal was born on 7 December 1935 in Botești as the first of four children to George and Eva; she received baptism on 8 December in her local parish from Father Felix Rafaelli. Her parents named her in honor of her paternal aunt who died at a tender age. Her parents spent so much time at work in the fields that her grandmother Zarafina raised her and instructed her in the faith; it was in her childhood her devotion to the Blessed Virgin manifested.

Her schooling was spent in her hometown from age seven where she earned good grades before leaving to join her parents to work in the fields. But it was when she was sixteen that she began manifesting a desire to enter a convent. Antal wanted also to help children. This never materialized because the communist regime had suppressed all convents and monasteries in Romania. Antal instead joined the Secular Franciscan Order (which her spiritual director Alois Donea advised her to) and then made a private vow of perpetual virginity.

Antal walked five miles to the nearest church just so that she could receive the Holy Communion. Antal also joined the Militia Immaculatae that Maximilian Kolbe founded. Not long before her death she began reading about Maria Goretti and confided later to two friends that she wished to act much like Goretti.

On the evening of 24 August 1958 she returned from her local parish after having just received the Confirmation from Petru Pleșca when Pavel Mocanu began to harass her en route home. He made indecent proposals to her and then attacked her in a vain effort to rape her. But Antal fended him off to the point he stabbed her to death with a knife 42 times. Her parents grew alarmed that she had not returned home so searched for her. Labourers en route to work discovered her corpse in the middle of a field on 26 August and discovered one of her rosaries clasped in her hands. Her face was downwards covered in blood with a cross of corn pods on her back. Her funeral was celebrated on 27 August. One friend present with Antal during the Confirmation said that "Veronica seemed pale and downcast" and later had a meal with one friend before the friends left and Antal travelled home.

== Beatification ==
The beatification process opened under Pope John Paul II on 10 July 2003 after the Congregation for the Causes of Saints issued the official "nihil obstat" (nothing against) edict and titled Antal as a Servant of God; the diocesan process was held in Iași from 25 November 2003 until 12 November 2006.

Pope Francis confirmed Veronica Antal's beatification on 26 January 2018 after determining that she died "in defensum castitatis". Her beatification was celebrated in Romania on 22 September 2018 with Cardinal Giovanni Angelo Becciu presiding on the pope's behalf. The postulator for this cause is the Franciscan friar Damian-Gheorghe Pătrașcu.
