= Coleta de Sabata =

Romanian engineer (1935–2021)

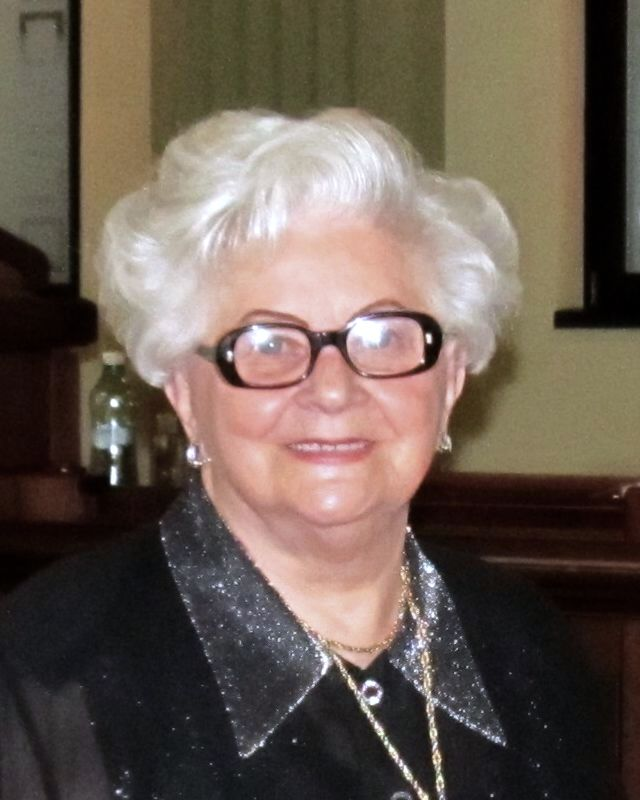
- De Sabata in 2014

rector of the Politehnica University of Timișoara
- In office 1981–1989

Personal details
- Born: 5 January 1935; Arad, Romania
- Died: 16 October 2021

Coleta de Sabata (5 January 1935 – 16 October 2021) was a Romanian engineer who served as rector of the Politehnica University of Timișoara.

== Life ==
De Sabata was born in Arad on 5 January 1935. She graduated from Colegiul Național "Elena Ghiba Birta" of Arad, and Timișoara Polytechnic Institute. In 1966 she defended her doctorate at "Gheorghe Asachi" Polytechnic Institute of Iași.

She was a professor at the Politehnica University of Timișoara. In 1981, she became rector of the institute, a position she would hold for eight years, until November 1989.

Her research field was solar energy storage. She had published results in books, and in journals such as the Thermal Science Journal. From 1990, she was a consultant professor and a doctoral supervisor in the field of solar energy.

== Works ==
- Arădani la început de veac, Arad : "Vasile Goldiş" University Press, 2000. ISBN 9789739328654, OCLC 895717330
