= European Council of Applied Sciences and Engineering =

Organization of Europe

logo

The European Council of Applied Sciences, Technologies and Engineering (Euro-CASE) is a European non-profit organization, which groups 19 to 20 European national academies of engineering, applied sciences and technology. The organization provides a European forum for exchange and consultation between European institutions, industry, research, and national governments.

The mission of the organization is to pursue, encourage and maintain excellence in the fields of engineering, applied sciences and technology, and promote their science, art and practice.

== Member academies ==
- Austrian Academy of Sciences (Österreichische Akademie der Wissenschaften) (Austria)
- The Royal Academies for Science and the Arts of Belgium (Class of Technical Sciences) - (before 2009: Royal Belgian Academy Council of Applied Sciences) (Belgium)
- Croatian Academy of Engineering (Akademija tehničkih znanosti Hrvatske) (HATZ) (Croatia)
- Engineering Academy of the Czech Republic (Strojírenská AAademie České Republiky) (EACR) (Czech Republic)
- Danish Academy of Technical Sciences (Akademiet for de Tekniske Videnskaber) (ATV) (Denmark)
- Technology Academy Finland (Tekniikan Akatemia) (TAF) (Finland)
- French Academy of Technologies (Académie des technologies) (France)
- German Academy of Science and Engineering (Deutsche Akademie der Technikwissenschaften) (Acatech) (Germany)
- Technical Chamber of Greece (Τεχνικό Επιμελητήριο Ελλάδας) (TEE-TCG) (Greece)
- Hungarian Academy of Engineering (Magyar Mérnöki Akadémia) (MMA) (Hungary)
- Irish Academy of Engineering (IAE) (Ireland)
- National Research Council (Italy) (Consiglio Nazionale delle Ricerche) (CISAI/FAST) (Italy)
- Netherlands Academy of Technology and Innovation (NATI) (The Netherlands)
- Norwegian Academy of Technological Sciences (Norges Tekniske Vitenskapsakademi) (NTVA) (Norway)
- Polish Academy of Sciences (Polska Akademia Nauk) (PAN) (Poland)
- Portuguese Academy of Engineering (Academia de Engenharia) (Portugal)
- Technical Sciences Academy of Romania (Academia de Știinșe Tehnice din România) (ASTR) (Romania)
- Engineering Academy of Slovenia (Inženirska akademija Slovenije) (IAS) (Slovenia)
- Royal Academy of Engineering (Spain) (Real Academia de Ingeniería) (RAI) (Spain)
- Royal Swedish Academy of Engineering Sciences (Kungliga Ingenjörsvetenskapsakademien),(IVA) (Sweden)
- Swiss Academy of Engineering Sciences (Schweizerische Akademie der Technischen Wissenschaften) (SATW) (Switzerland)
- Royal Academy of Engineering (RAEng) (United Kingdom)

== See also ==
- Academia Europaea
- acatech
- European IST Grand Prize
- European Research Advisory Board
- European Research Area (ERA)
- European Research Council
- Information Society Technologies Advisory Group (ISTAG)
