= 1936 in Romania =

- Decades: 1910s; 1920s; 1930s; 1940s; 1950s
- See also: Other events of 1936; History of Romania; Timeline of Romanian history; Years in Romania

Events from the year 1936 in Romania. The year saw the Craiova Trial of Romanian Communist Party activists.

== Incumbents ==
- King: Carol II.
- Prime Minister: Gheorghe Tătărescu.

== Events ==
- 10 May – The National Museum of the Village "Dimitrie Gusti" (Muzeul Național al Satului "Dimitrie Gusti") is founded.
- 16 May – Ford Romania open their factory in Bucharest capable of assembling 2,500 cars a year.
- 24 May – Romania wins the Balkan Cup for the third time, with Sándor Schwartz scoring the most goals in the tournament.
- 5 June – Ana Pauker and eighteen other Communist activists are put on trial in Craiova.
- 20 July – Romania signs the Montreux Convention Regarding the Regime of the Straits governing the Bosporus and Dardanelles.
- Date unknown – Henri Rang wins silver in the 1936 Summer Olympics in the Grand Prix des Nations.

== Births ==
- 23 January – Georgeta Hurmuzachi, artistic gymnast, bronze medal winner at the 1956 Summer Olympics.
- 9 April – Dorin N. Poenaru, nuclear physicist and engineer.
- 13 October – Elika Ussoskin, Romanian-born Israeli judge.
- 25 October – Elena Mărgărit, gymnast, bronze medal winner at the 1956 and 1960 Summer Olympics.
- 12 December – Iolanda Balaș, high jumper who held the world record and became the first Romanian woman to win an Olympic gold medal, in the 1960 games. She also won a medal at the 1964 Summer Olympics.

== Deaths ==
- 2 March – Alexandru Ciura, journalist, short story writer, and priest (born 1876).
- 8 June – Dumitru Ștefănescu, known as Gogea Mitu, the tallest Romanian and tallest professional boxer in history (born 1909).
