= 2020 in Romania =

- Decades: 2000s; 2010s; 2020s
- See also: Other events of 2020; History of Romania; Timeline of Romanian history; Years in Romania

Events from the year 2020 in Romania.

== Incumbents ==
- President: Klaus Iohannis
- Prime Minister: Ludovic Orban (until 7 December) · Nicolae Ciucă (since 7 December until 23 December; acting) · Florin Cîțu (since 23 December)
- President of the Senate: Teodor Meleșcanu (until 3 February) · Titus Corlățean (until 9 April; acting) · Robert Cazanciuc (ro) (since 9 April until 20 December 2020; acting) · Anca Dragu (since 21 December)
- President of the Chamber of Deputies: Marcel Ciolacu (since 29 May 2019 until 20 December 2020) · Ludovic Orban (since 22 December)

== Events ==
=== January ===
- 15 January – Romania's Day of National Culture (Romanian: Ziua Culturii Naționale) is celebrated by the Ministry of Culture at the Romanian Athenaeum with a gala concert performed by the Romanian Youth Orchestra, conducted by Gabriel Bebeșelea. Klaus Iohannis and Ludovic Orban attend the concert. Broadcasting starts at 18:30 EET on TVR1 and at 19:00 EET on Radio România Cultural.
- 26 January – A xenophobic incident in Ditrău between two Sri Lankan workers and the local Hungarian population starts.

=== February ===
- 5 February – The First Orban cabinet was dissolved, after a no-confidence vote initiated by the PSD passed with 261 votes.
- 21 February – Following a COVID-19 outbreak in Italy, the Romanian government announced a 14-day quarantine for citizens returning from the affected regions.
- 22 February – The Romanian government announced several preventive measures including designation of five hospitals as isolation centers for new cases, purchase and placement of thermal scanners in international airports and specially designated lines for passengers coming from areas affected by COVID-19 outbreak.
- 25 February – New measures were imposed. Upon arrival on the Romanian territory, all asymptomatic travelers from the affected areas, respectively Hubei, the 11 localities in Italy, and any remaining passengers on the Diamond Princess cruise ship will go directly to the quarantine, for a period for 14 days. The other people coming from the Lombardy and Veneto regions will enter voluntary isolation at home for 14 days, upon arrival in Romania.
- 26 February – The 1st case of the COVID-19 pandemic in Romania.
- 28 February – The Romanian Orthodox Church suggested that followers use their own spoons and avoid the traditional kissing of icons in church.

=== March ===
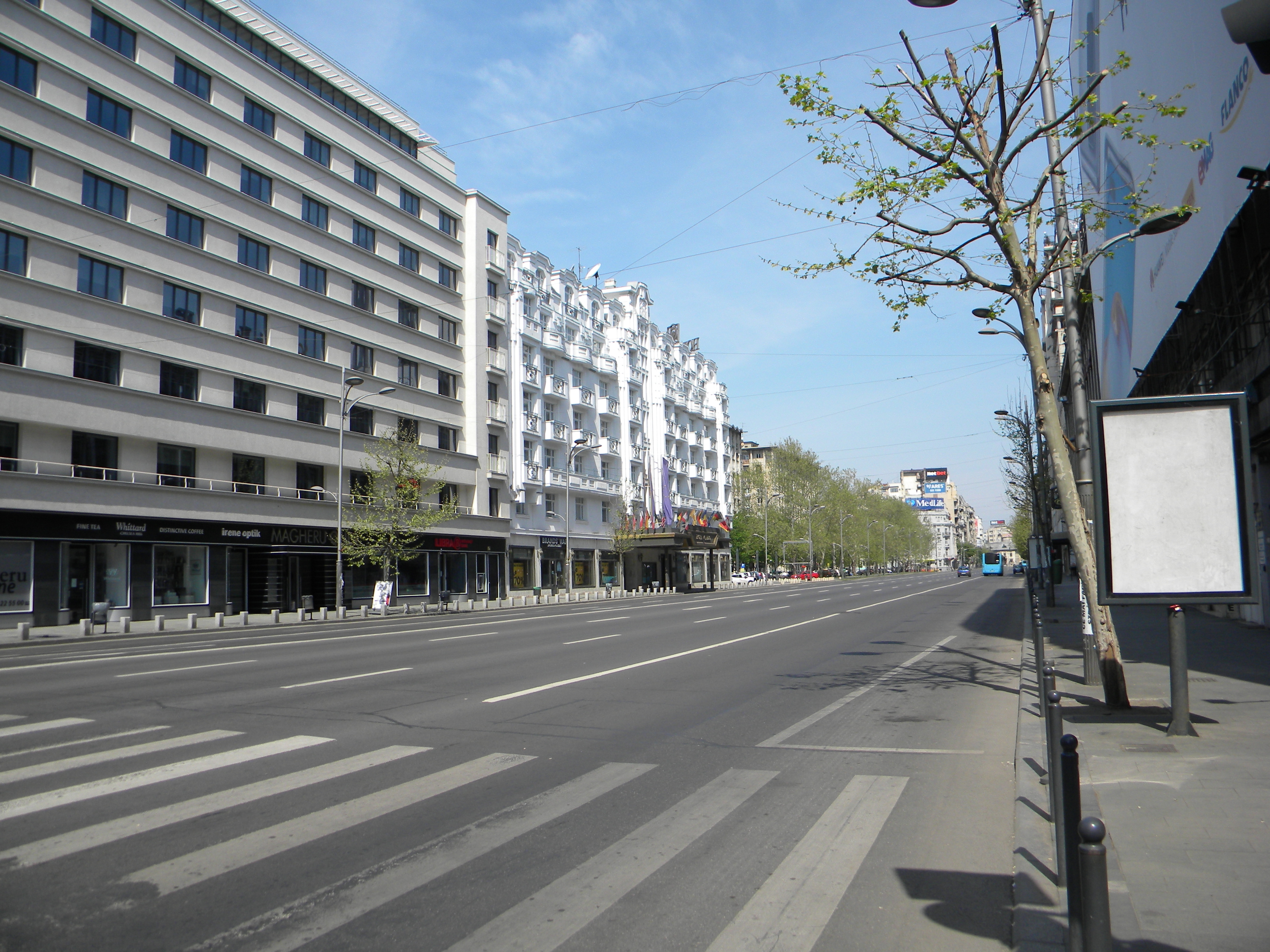
A nearly deserted Magheru Boulevard in Bucharest, 19 April

- No specific day – The xenophobic incident of Ditrău calms down and ends.
- 2 March – More preventive measures were taken by the National Committee for Special Emergency Situations. Thus, citizens arriving from other provinces or cities in mainland China, other localities in Lombardy, Veneto or Emilia-Romagna regions of Italy, as well as areas and localities in South Korea and Iran not previously specified for institutionalized quarantine, enter 14 days of self-isolation at home immediately upon returning to Romania.
- 16 March – The state of emergency was established in Romania for a period of 30 days, in an effort to slow the spread of COVID-19 in Romania. The announcement was made by President Klaus Iohannis after the ceremony of forming the Second Orban cabinet.
- 22 March – First death caused by COVID-19 in Romania.

=== May ===
- 15 May – The state of emergency imposed due to the COVID-19 pandemic was lifted, being replaced with the state of alert. The national lockdown imposed almost two months ago was lifted as well, and the first set of relaxation measures took effect nationwide.

=== September ===
- 27 September - 2020 Romanian local elections

=== November ===
- 14 November – Piatra Neamț hospital fire, 10 deaths.

=== December ===
- 2 December – The first kilometers of controlled-access highway (16.2 km) in the historical region of Moldavia open near Bacău, part of the A7.
- 6 December – 2020 Romanian legislative election
- 10 December – Bucharest was chosen to host the cybersecurity center of the European Union, from a list of cities that included Brussels, Munich, Warsaw, Vilnius, Luxembourg and León. It is the first EU agency hosted by Romania.
- 23 December – The Cîțu Cabinet was formed. It is a coalition with PNL, USR-PLUS and UDMR as member parties, and is led by Florin Cîțu.
- 25 December – Socola hospital fire, 1 death.
- 27 December – Romania starts its COVID-19 vaccination campaign, under an effort to end the COVID-19 pandemic, after the first 10,000 doses of the Pfizer-BioNTech COVID-19 vaccine arrived two days earlier via the Nădlac border crossing point on the A1 motorway, at the presence of Raed Arafat and Valeriu Gheorghiță in the area.

== Deaths ==
=== January ===
- 5 January – Peter Wertheimer, 72, Romanian-Israeli flautist, saxophonist and clarinetist, cancer.
- 18 January – Dan Andrei Aldea, 69, Romanian rock musician (Sfinx), heart attack.

=== February ===
- 1 February – Ilie Bărbulescu, footballer (b. 1957)
- 3 February – Aurel Șelaru, Olympic racing cyclist (b. 1935)
- 4 February – Zwy Milshtein, 85, Romanian-born French painter.
- 13 February – Herman Kahan, 93, Romanian-born Norwegian businessman and Holocaust survivor.
- 14 February – Decebal Traian Remeș, economist and politician, Minister of Finance (b. 1949)
- 25 February – Lívia Rusz, 89, Romanian-Hungarian graphic artist.

=== March ===
- 20 March – Mikhail Voloshin, 66, Romanian-born American theoretical physicist, heart failure.
- Gino Volpe, 77, Italian singer-songwriter, heart attack.
- 22 March
  - Ciprian Foias, mathematician (b. 1933)
  - Vintilă Mihăilescu, anthropologist (b. 1951)
- 23 March – Júlia Sigmond, 90, Hungarian-Romanian puppet actress, COVID-19.
- 24 March – Paul Goma, writer and dissident (b. 1935)
- 26 March – Constantin Drăgănescu, actor (b. 1936)
- 30 March – Martin Tudor, footballer (b. 1976)

=== April ===
- 10 April – Olga Bucătaru, actress (b. 1942)
- 12 April – Adrian Lucaci, footballer (b. 1966)
- 24 April – Mircea Mureșan, film director (b. 1928)

=== May ===
- 16 May – Constantin Radu, footballer (b. 1945)
- 18 May – Cornel Georgescu, footballer and manager (b. 1955)

=== June ===
- 9 June – Gigi Marga, singer (b. 1929)
- 19 June – Dumitru Munteanu, footballer (b. 1932)
- 25 June – Ionuț Popa, footballer (b. 1953)
- 27 June – Mihai Romilă, footballer (b. 1950)

=== August ===
- 1 August – Emil Ciocoiu, painter and photographer.
- 10 August – Jacobo Langsner, 93, Romanian-born Uruguayan playwright.
- 11 August – Oliviu Gherman, academic, politician, and diplomat.
- 13 August – Richard M. Weiner, 90, Romanian-born German theoretical physicist.
- 16 August – Viorica Ionică, Olympics handball player (1976).
- 18 August – Gheorghe Dogărescu, Olympics handball player(1984).
- 22 August – Emil Jula, footballer (Universitatea Cluj, Oțelul Galați, Energie Cottbus), heart failure.

=== September ===
- 30 September – Eli Ruckenstein, 95, Romanian-born American physical chemist.

=== October ===
- 10 October – Constantin Frosin, writer and translator (b. 1952)
- 12 October – Ion Predescu, politician and magistrate (b. 1927)
- 20 October – Yehoshua Blau, 101, Romanian-born Israeli literary scholar.

=== November ===
- 1 November – Keith Hitchins, American historian and expert on Romanian history (b. 1931)
- 5 November – Géza Szőcs, poet and politician (b. 1953)Géza Szőcs, 67, Romanian-Hungarian poet and politician, secretary of state for culture (2010–2012), COVID-19.
- 6 November – Constantin Dan Vasiliu, politician (b. 1951)
- 7 November – Vasile Gherasim, politician (b. 1950)
- 9 November – Virginia Bonci, Olympic track and field athlete (b. 1949)
- 10 November – Vladimir Găitan, actor (b. 1947)
- 18 November – Draga Olteanu Matei, actress (b. 1933)
- 29 November – Viorel Turcu, footballer (b. 1960)

=== December ===
- 31 December – Constantin Bosânceanu, footballer (b. 1966)

== See also ==
- 2020 in the European Union
- Romania in the Eurovision Song Contest 2020
- Romania at the 2020 Winter Youth Olympics
