= Camelia Diaconescu =

Romanian rower

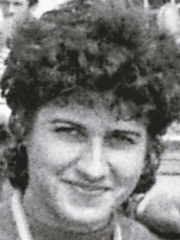

Personal information
- Born: 2 February 1963 (age 63) Văleni, Neamț, Romania
- Height: 178 cm (5 ft 10 in)
- Weight: 80 kg (176 lb)

Sport
- Sport: Rowing
- Club: Steaua Bucharest
Medal record
Representing Romania
Olympic Games
Silver medal – second place	1984 Los Angeles	Eights
World Championships
Bronze medal – third place	1985 Hazewinkel	Eights
Bronze medal – third place	1986 Nottingham	Eights

Camelia Diaconescu (born 2 February 1963) is a Romanian rower. Competing in the eights she won an Olympic silver medal in 1984 and world championships bronze medals in 1985 and 1986.
