= 2008 in Romania =

- Decades: 1980s; 1990s; 2000s; 2010s; 2020s
- See also: Other events of 2008; History of Romania; Timeline of Romanian history; Years in Romania

Events from the year 2008 in Romania.

== Incumbents ==
- President: Traian Băsescu
- Prime Minister: Călin Popescu-Tăriceanu (until 22 December); Emil Boc (from 22 December)

== Events ==
- April 2 – A NATO summit takes place at the Palace of the Parliament, Bucharest.
- May - Never Mind the Balkans, Here's Romania story collection is published.
- June 1 – 2008 Romanian local elections, with a runoff for mayors on June 15.
- November 15 – Petrila Mine disaster: Twelve miners die after two explosions at a mine in Petrila, one of six coal mining cities in the Jiu Valley region of Hunedoara County.
- November 24 – Another miner dies at Floreasca Hospital in Bucharest, raising the death toll from the Petrila Mine disaster to 13.
- November 30 – 2008 Romanian legislative election.

== Deaths ==
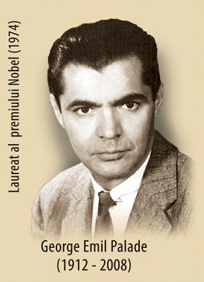
George Emil Palade

- January 3 – Petru Dugulescu, pastor, politician (born 1945)
- January 22 – Ștefan Niculescu, composer (born 1927)
- February 18 – Mihaela Mitrache, actress (born 1955)
- August 16 – Elena Leușteanu, Olympic gymnast (born 1935)
- September 7 – Ilarion Ciobanu, actor (born 1931)
- September 14 – Ștefan Iordache, actor (born 1941)
- October 8 – George Emil Palade, cell biologist, Nobel Prize laureate (born 1912)

== See also ==
- List of Romanian films of 2008
- 2008 in the European Union
- 2008 in Europe
- Romania in the Eurovision Song Contest 2008
- Romania at the 2008 Summer Olympics
- Romania at the 2008 Summer Paralympics
