= 1934 in Romania =

- Decades: 1910s; 1920s; 1930s; 1940s; 1950s
- See also: Other events of 1934; History of Romania; Timeline of Romanian history; Years in Romania

Events from the year 1934 in Romania. The year saw the country sign the Balkan Pact.

== Incumbents ==
- King: Carol II.
- Prime Minister:
  - Constantin Angelescu (interim, until 4 January).
  - Gheorghe Tătărescu (from 5 January).

== Events ==
- 9 February – Romania signs the Balkan Pact with Greece, Turkey and Yugoslavia in Athens.
- 27 May – The national football team is defeated by Czechoslovakia in the first round of the 1934 FIFA World Cup.
- 20 August – The Union of Hungarian Workers of Romania (MADOSZ, Magyar Dolgozók Országos Szövetsége or Uniunea Oamenilor Muncii Maghiari din România) is founded.
- 26 September – Ford Romania buy the land on which they will build their factory in Bucharest.
- October – The Criterion Association is dissolved, Mircea Vulcănescu citing the rise of fascism for the demise.
- 22 November – Mihai Stelescu founds the newspaper Cruciada Românismului to propagate the Crusade of Romanianism.

== Births ==
- 22 February – Iuliana Simon, skier that competed in the 1956 Winter Olympics.
- 29 April – Zoe Țapu, agronomist (died 2013).
- 6 May – Stela Perin, artistic gymnast that competed in the 1952 Summer Olympics.
- 21 September – Maria Scheip, handballer, gold medallist at the 1956, 1960, and 1962 World Championships.
- 15 November – Kira Muratova, Romanian-born Soviet film director and screenwriter (died 2018).
- 10 December – Leopoldina Bălănuță, actor (died 1998).

== Deaths ==
- 14 January – Ioan Cantacuzino, physician, bacteriologist, and a titular member of the Romanian Academy (born 1863).
- 16 February – Ștefan Cicio Pop, politician (born 1865).
- 20 April – Constanța Hodoș, novelist, playwright and journalist (born 1860).
- 24 September – Alexandru Mavrodi, director of the National Theatre Bucharest (born 1881).
