= Văleni, Neamț =

Văleni
- Commune
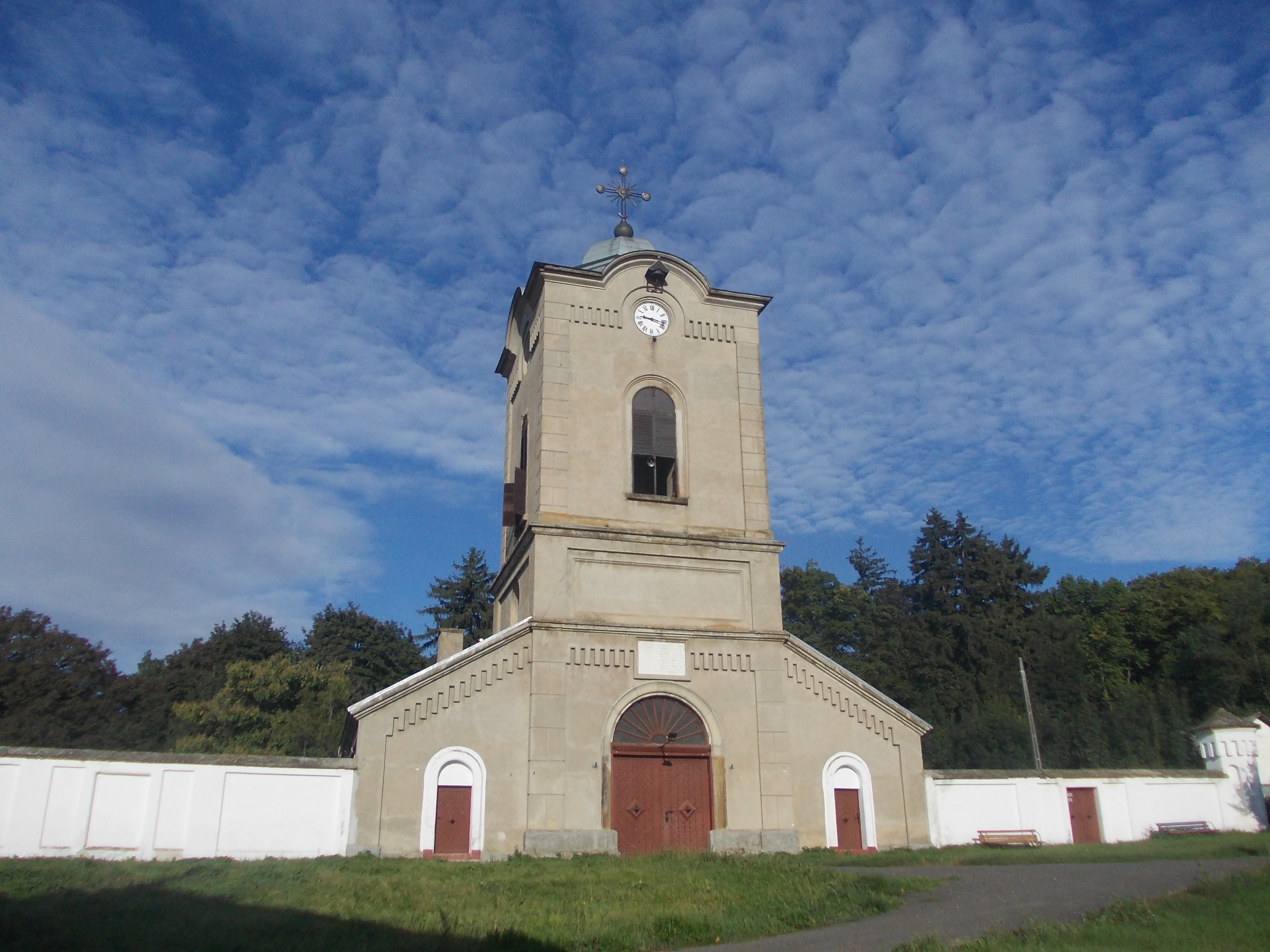
- Forty Martyrs Church in Văleni

- Location in Neamț County

- Location in Romania
- Coordinates: 47°01′40″N 26°41′15″E
- Country: Romania
- County: Neamț

Government
  - Mayor (2020–2024): Dan-Relu Grigore (PSD)
- Area: 34.87 km^{2} (13.46 sq mi)
- Elevation: 122 m (400 ft)
- Population (2021-12-01): 1,208
  - Density: 34.64/km^{2} (89.72/sq mi)
- Time zone: UTC+02:00 (EET)
  - Summer (DST): UTC+03:00 (EEST)
- Postal code: 617097
- Area code: (+40) 02 33
- Vehicle reg.: NT
- Website: www.valenineamt.ro

Văleni is a commune in Neamț County, Western Moldavia, Romania. It is composed of four villages: David, Moreni, Munteni, and Văleni. These were part of Botești Commune until 2004, when they were split off.

Historical population
Year	Pop.	±%
2002	1,632	—
2011	1,380	−15.4%
2021	1,208	−12.5%
Source: Census data

== Natives ==
- Camelia Diaconescu (born 1963), rower
