= 2010 in Romania =

- Decades: 1990s; 2000s; 2010s; 2020s
- See also: Other events of 2010; History of Romania; Timeline of Romanian history; Years in Romania

Events from the year 2010 in Romania.

Timeline of the borders of Romania between 1859 and 2010

== Incumbents ==
- President: Traian Băsescu
- Prime Minister: Emil Boc

== Events ==
- February 19 - Romania is set to introduce a tax on fast food in March.
- May 19 - At least 40,000 Romanians rally in Bucharest to protest planned wage cuts the government says are needed to shore up the ailing economy.
- June 25 - The Constitutional Court of Romania rules that government budget plans are "unconstitutional"; this decision cannot be appealed.
- June 29 - At least 21 people die and hundreds are evacuated after major floods in the northeast of Romania.
- August 31 - Fossils of Balaur genus dinosaur are unearthed in Romania.
- September 2 - Sebastian Vlădescu is replaced as Romanian Minister of Finance by Gheorghe Ialomitianu as part of a Cabinet reshuffle.

== Deaths ==
=== January ===
- January 5 - Toni Tecuceanu, 37, Romanian comedy actor, bacterial infection.

=== February ===
- February 25 – Gheorghe Gaston Marin, 91, Romanian politician.

=== March ===
- March 9 - Gheorghe Constantin, 77, Romanian footballer and manager.
- March 17 - Ștefan Gheorghiu, 83, Romanian violinist.

=== April ===
- April 4 - Lajos Bálint, 80, Hungarian-born Romanian Roman Catholic prelate, archbishop of Alba Iulia (1990–1993).
- April 17 - Alexandru Neagu, 61, Romanian footballer (FC Rapid București).
- April 29 - Avigdor Arikha, 81, Romanian-born Israeli painter, complications of cancer.

=== May ===
- May 26 - Jean Constantin, 82, Romanian actor, natural causes.

=== July ===
- July 6 - Simion Stanciu, 60, Romanian pan flautist, after long illness.
- July 14 - Mădălina Manole, 43, Romanian pop singer, suicide.
- July 29 - Nicolae Popescu, 72, Romanian mathematician.

=== August ===
- August 21 - Gheorghe Apostol, 97, Romanian politician, General Secretary of the Romanian Communist Party (1954–1955).
- August 22 - Gheorghe Fiat, 81, Romanian Olympic bronze medal-winning (1952) boxer.

=== November ===
- November 1 - Mihai Chițac, 81, Romanian general, Minister of Interior (1989–1990), after long illness.
- November 5 - Adrian Păunescu, 67, Romanian author, poet and politician.
- November 16 - Ilie Savu, 90, Romanian footballer and coach, hepatic cirrhosis.
- November 20 - Roxana Briban, 39, Romanian soprano, apparent suicide.

=== December ===
- December 10 - Nicolas Astrinidis, 89, Romanian-born Greek composer, pianist, conductor, and educator.

== See also ==
- 2010 in the European Union
- 2010 in Europe
- Romania in the Eurovision Song Contest 2010
- Romania at the 2010 Winter Olympics
- Romania at the 2010 Winter Paralympics
- Romania at the 2010 Summer Youth Olympics
- List of 2010 box office number-one films in Romania
