= Ion Dincă =

Romanian communist politician and Army general (1928-2007)

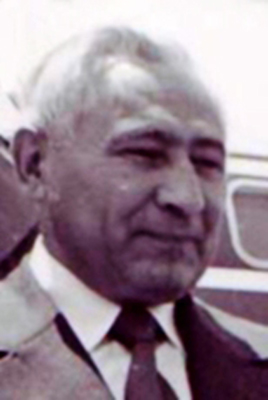
Ion Dincă

Ion Dincă (November 3, 1928 – January 9, 2007) was a Romanian communist politician and Army general who served as Deputy Prime Minister and Mayor of Bucharest under the Communist regime.

Born in Cobia, Dâmbovița County, in 1947, he moved to Făgăraș, where he worked as a lathe machinist at Nitramonia company, also joining the Romanian Communist Party. He graduated from two military academies, and in 1968, he was named a military adviser of the president and deputy of the Military Department of the Central Committee, in charge with Internal Affairs, State Security, Justice and the prosecutor's office.

Joining the Communist Party in 1947, between 1969 and 1989, he was a member of the Central Committee and between 1976 and 1989, he was a member of the Executive Political Committee, being in charge with Industry, Agriculture and Constructions. He also served as Mayor of Bucharest, between 1976 and 1979, being in charge when the demolitions of central Bucharest occurred. Dincă was a deputy Prime Minister between 1979 and 1989.

During the 1989 Revolution, he was among the people who encouraged Ceaușescu not to give in to the protesters. On 2 February 1990, after a four-day trial, Dincă was sentenced to life in prison, confiscation of all property and payment of court charges. He was freed after about five years. Afterwards, he worked for one of the companies of his son-in-law, Nicolae Badea.

Nicknamed "Te leagă" (He will tie you up) because of his eagerness to have people arrested, and Balconetti (because, while he was mayor of Bucharest he forbade people to modify their balconies), he had two daughters, both of whom used to be Arabic language teachers for the Securitate officers, who have settled in the United States after the Romanian Revolution of 1989. One of his daughters, Doina, married in the early 1980s future controversial businessman Gabriel Popoviciu.

Dincă died on January 9, 2007, and was buried at the Ghencea Military Cemetery in Bucharest.

== Awards ==
- Work Order, Second Class (1948)
- "23 August" Order (three times)
- Hero of Socialist Work (1981)
