= Choreomusicology =

Choreomusicology is a portmanteau word joining the words choreology and musicology.

As a discipline, choreomusicology emerged at the end of the twentieth century as a field of study concerned with the relationship between music and dance. More precisely, choreomusicology grew out of Euro-American performance traditions that considered musical composition and dance choreography as separate specialties. Not all performance genres separate music and dance into separate theoretical categories. The directionality of the relationship between sound and movement is not always fixed.

Choreomusicologists hold that studying the variable relationships between sound and movement in diverse performance arts can provide insight into perceptual sensibilities, cultural processes, and interpersonal dynamics. Famous artists whose works exhibit rich choreomusical relationships include: John Cage and Merce Cunningham, Igor Stravinsky and George Balanchine, and Louis Horst and Martha Graham. Interesting choreomusical relationships also exist in West Sumatran Tari Piring, West Javanese Pencak Silat, and Afro-Brazilian Capoeira to name but a few examples.

The following institutions have developed programs practicing and/or researching choreomusicology: accompagnement choregraphique CNSMDP (Paris), continuing studies at Institut del Teatre (Barcelona), MAD at DNSPA (Copenhagen). MCD at AND (Rome - L'Aquila).

== See also ==
- Ethnochoreology
- Ethnomusicology
