= Anca Giurchescu =

Academic, ethnochoreologist

- Born: Rodica Maria Anca Ciortea; 19 December 1930; Bucharest, Kingdom of Romania
- Died: 4 April 2015 (aged 84); Copenhagen, Denmark
- Citizenship: Romania; Denmark
- Education: National Institute of Physical Education
- Occupation(s): Ethnochoreologist, folklorist
- Years active: 1953–2015
- Spouse: Lucian Giurchescu
- Children: 1

Anca Giurchescu née Ciortea (19 December 1930 – 4 April 2015) was a Romanian researcher of folk dance, and an ethnochoreologist, one of the founders of the discipline. Born in Bucharest to a family formerly from Translylvania, she lived in that region as a child. Entering university, she studied dance at the National Institute of Physical Education. During her schooling, she participated in competitive target shooting and was a silver (team) and bronze (individual) medalist in the 1955 European Shooting Championship. While still studying, she began working as a researcher at the Folklore Institute and in 1962 became a member of the International Council for Traditional Music. The Council established a working group which included Giurchescu, that laid the foundation for the science of ethnochoreology.

In 1979, Giurchescu joined her husband in Copenhagen, after attending a seminar in Belfast, and defected. She continued her research into the cultural, historical, and social context of dance and taught throughout Europe and the United States. In 1989, the family returned to Romania, when the Socialist Republic of Romania was overthrown and remained for four years before returning to Copenhagen. She led numerous international research trips to study rituals and dance traditions among various ethnic minorities with roots in Romania and the surrounding countries. She was chair of the Study Group on Ethnochoreology of the International Council for Traditional Music from 1998 to 2006 and founding chair of their Ethnochoreology Sub-Study Group on Field Research Theory and Methods, leading it from 1990 to 2014.

== Early life ==
Rodica Maria Anca Ciortea was born 19 December 1930 in Bucharest, Romania to Livia (née Mircea) and Marin Ciortea. Her family was Transylvanian, originally from Cața in the Rupea-Sighișoara area. Her mother was the granddaughter of Nicolae Mircea, who co-founded Caru' cu Bere in 1899, when he and his brothers Ignat and Víctor expanded their 20-year-old brewery business to include a restaurant. Her father was an engineer working in the methane gas industry. He owned a farm near Copșa Mică and worked in Mediaș, where he also was a well-known painter and author. The farm was open to many artists and writers, and literary figures like Lucian Blaga often gathered there.

From the second grade, Ciortea studied in Sibiu until her father was transferred to Bucharest to manage a gas plant there. She began her university studies at the National Institute of Physical Education in 1949. That year, the Romanian government nationalized her family's business, assuming the ownership of Caru' cu Bere. Her mother wanted her to study medicine, but Ciortea was interested in studying dance. During her schooling, she joined the national shooting team, as the only woman on the team. She won the national shooting competition for the eight kilo rifle, several times. In 1955, she was part of the team that won the silver medal in the European Shooting Championship and she won an individual bronze, before being dismissed from the team for having bourgeois ancestry. She was also removed from classes for similar reasons, but continued her education by taking night courses, until she was allowed to be readmitted.

== Career ==
While she was in school, Ciortea began working in an electrical appliance factory, fine tuning mechanical equipment. She had an aunt who suggested she should work in the dance research department of the recently established Folklore Institute in Bucharest (then Institutul de Folclor, now known as Constantin Brăiloiu Institute of Ethnography and Folklore). Hired in 1953, Ciortea worked there until 1979, advancing to become a senior researcher. She conducted fieldwork, documenting rituals and dances in rural areas, trying to analyze the structure and development of various dances. She also conducted research into how traditions were used by officials as propaganda to develop and justify their power, and how they formed the identity of minority groups, such as the Romani people. She married Lucian Giurchescu, a Romanian stage director, and in 1959 the couple had a daughter, Ileana.

In 1962, Giurchescu joined the International Council for Traditional Music where she was a member of the working group that defined the methodology for ethnochoreology and founded it as a scientific field. The following year, she graduated with her degree from the National Institute of Physical Education. In her subsequent work, Giurchescu considered folk dance, or traditional dance, as an exchange of information between the performers and the audience influenced by cultural, historical, and social contexts. She drew a distinction between the cultural aesthetics of traditional dance and the organized presentation of choreography in staged dance, wherein the composition and structural features of the art take precedence over social context. She noted that in traditional dance, an understanding of the composition, melody, and rhythm of the music performed was essential to placing dance steps in a precise pattern to convey its meaning.

In 1979, Giurchescu's daughter was able to obtain a tourist visa to visit Sweden. Though it was unusual for Romanian authorities to allow an entire family to be absent at the same time, while Ileana was in Sweden, Lucian was working with the Comedy Theater (Romanian: Teatrul de Comedie) which was touring in Denmark, and Giurchescu was simultaneously abroad, lecturing in Belfast. She called her husband, who encouraged her to come to his show's opening. On her arrival in Copenhagen in November, Lucian told her he had decided to defect. The family were granted the status of political refugees and Giurchescu enrolled in classes to learn Danish.

For fifteen years, Giurchescu was a lecturer in ethnochoreology courses under the Erasmus student exchange program at the Norwegian University of Science and Technology in Trondheim, where she taught many European students. She also lectured abroad, in Britain, Hungary, Norway, and the United States. In 1989, when the Socialist Republic of Romania was overthrown, the family returned to Bucharest. Four years later, they returned to Copenhagen, but as they had dual citizenship, they returned to Romania several times a year. Giurchescu was recognized for her teaching excellence with an honorary doctorate from London's University of Roehampton in 2009. Returning to field research in 1990, she began collaborating with Speranța Rădulescu on the relationship between Hungarian and Romanian Romani peoples. That year, Giurchescu founded the International Council for Traditional Music's Ethnochoreology Sub-Study Group on Field Research Theory and Methods and headed the group through 2014.

In 1993, Giurchescu led an international, interdisciplinary team to Optași-Măgura and Osica de Sus in Olt County to study the ritual aspects of căluș, a traditional Romanian healing and fertility rite. Performed in the spring, it incorporates dance in ceremonial performances to bestow good health and luck on villagers. She led a second international group to study local dance and music traditions in villages in the communes of Ceanu Mare and Frata part of the Transylvanian region of Romania. Returning to the area in 2001, she took a group south of the Danube into Bulgaria and Serbia, to study the Romanian-speaking Rudari, a Balkan ethnic minority and Vlach people, a Serbian ethnic minority and compare their rituals on căluș, supernatural forces, and death practices to those already studied on the northern side of the river. During the trip, Giurchescu learned of a migration in the 1960s of people from the Timok Valley to Scandinavia. Returning to Denmark, she conducted research on the traditional culture of the Danish community of Vlachs.

Giurchescu served as chair of the Council's Study Group on Ethnochoreology between 1998 and 2006, and from 1999 through 2005 was secretary of the Study Group on Music and Minorities. In 2009, Giurchescu founded "Etnocor", a center located in Cluj-Napoca to facilitate studies in ethnochoreology, by creating an archive of reference works. Her last field study was undertaken with Liz Mellish and a team of international researchers to collect information in the village of Svinița on the ritual dance joc de pomană, which pays homage to the dead one year after their death. She continued to write about the methodology and theory of conducting field research and her final project was in conjunction with Margaret H. Beissinger and Speranța Rădulescu. Manele in Romania: Cultural Expression and Social Meaning in Balkan Popular Music, was posthumously published and dedicated to Giurchescu.

== Death and legacy ==
Giurchescu died on 4 April 2015 in Copenhagen. In May, the Cluj-Napoca branch of the Romanian Academy hosted a session of talks, dedicated to her memory, during the conference Confesiune, Societate, Identitate (Confession, Society, Identity) held at Babeș-Bolyai University. In November, Csongor Könczei published Coregrafia și etnocoreologia maghiară din Transilvania în mileniul trei II (Hungarian Choreography and Ethnocoreology from Transylvania in the Third Millennium II) and dedicated the volume to Giurchescu.

== Selected works ==
- Giurchescu, Anca (1957). "Din Realizării Folcloristicii Noastre" [From the Achievements of Our Folklore]. Revista de folclor (in Romanian). 2 (4). Bucharest, Romania: Institut de Folclor: 129–130. ISSN 1015-4779.
- Giurchescu, Anca (1964). "Însemnări pe Marginea Celui de-ai VII-lea Concurs al Formaților Artistice de Amatori" [Notes in the Margins of the 7th Competition of Amateur Artistic Formats]. Revista de Etnografieși Folclor (in Romanian). 9 (1). Bucharest, Romania: 639–642.
- Proca-Ciortea, Vera; Giurchescu, Anca (1968). "Quelques aspects théoriques de l'analyse de la danse populaire" [Some Theoretical Aspects of Folk Dance Analysis]. Languages (in French). 3 (10). Paris, France: Éditions Larousse: 87–93. doi:10.3406/lgge.1968.2551. ISSN 0458-726X. OCLC 4655859367.
- Giurchescu, Anca (1975). "Időszerű kérdések a román néptánc kutatásában" [Topical Issues in the Study of Romanian Folk Dance]. Tánctudományi Tanulmányok (in Hungarian). Budapest, Hungary: Magyar Táncművészek Szövetsége: 191–204. OCLC 83238060.
- Giurchescu, Anca (1987). "The Dance Discourse: Dance Suites and Dance Cycles of Romania and Elsewhere in Europe". Dance Studies. 11. St. Peter, Jersey, Channel Islands: Centre for Dance Studies: 9–71. OCLC 77642054.
- Giurchescu, Anca (1991). "Methods of Research: Stydying a Dance Event among the Vlachs Living in Denmark". In Buckley, Ann I.; Edström, Karl-Olof; Nixon, Paul (eds.). Proceedings of the Second British-Swedish Conference on Musicology: Ethnmusicology, Cambridge, 5–10 August 1989. Gothenburg, Sweden: Department of Musicology, University of Gothenburg. pp. 341–355. ISBN 978-91-85974-18-4.
- Giurchescu, Anca; Torp, Lisbet (1991). "Theory and Methods in Dance Research: A European Approach to Dance Research: The European Method of Dance Research with a Holistic Approach". Yearbook for Traditional Music. 23. Cambridge, UK: Cambridge University Press for the International Council for Traditional Music: 1–10. doi:10.2307/768392. ISSN 0740-1558. JSTOR 768392. OCLC 84118186.
- Giurchescu, Anca (1992). "A Comparative Analysis between the "Cålus" of the Danube Plain and "Cåluşerul" of Transylvania (Romania)". Studia Musicologica Academiae Scientiarum Hungaricae. 34 (1–2). Budapest, Hungary: Akadémiai Kiadó: 31–44. doi:10.2307/902359. ISSN 0039-3266. JSTOR 902359. OCLC 7374880606.
- Giurchescu, Anca; Bloland, Sunni (1995). Romanian Traditional Dance: A Contextual and Structural Approach. American-Romanian Academy of Arts and Sciences. Vol. 14. Mill Valley, California: Wild Flower Press. ISBN 978-0-912131-16-0.
- Giurchescu, Anca (2001). "The Power of Dance and its Social and Political Uses". Yearbook for Traditional Music. 33. Cambridge, UK: Cambridge University Press for the International Council for Traditional Music: 109–121. doi:10.2307/1519635. ISSN 0740-1558. JSTOR 1519635. OCLC 6733293710. S2CID 147023813.
- Giurchescu, Anca (2014). "Experiencing the Field: Fieldwork Research Theory, Methods and Experience". In Fiskvik, Anne Margrete; Stranden, Marit (eds.). (Re)Searching the Field: Festschrift in Honour of Egil Bakka. Bergen, Norway: Fagbokforlaget. pp. 213–226. ISBN 978-82-321-0371-3.
- Giurchescu, Anca (2016). "Enacting Tradition: The ora – Event Marker of Ethnic and Cultural Identity of the Vlachs Settled in Denmark". In Kahl, Thede (ed.). Von Hora, Doina und Lautaren: Einblicke in die rumänische Musik und Musikwissenschaft. Berlin, Germany: Frank & Timme GmbH. pp. 155–165. ISBN 978-3-7329-0310-8.
- Beissinger, Margaret; Rădulescu, Speranța; Giurchescu, Anca (2016). Manele in Romania: Cultural Expression and Social Meaning in Balkan Popular Music. Lanham, Maryland: Rowman & Littlefield. ISBN 978-1-4422-6708-4. Posthumous publication dedicated to her memory.
