= Botești =

- Commune
- Coat of arms

- Location in Neamț County

- Location in Romania
- Coordinates: 47°3′N 26°44′E
- Country: Romania
- County: Neamț

Government
  - Mayor (2020–2024): Georgeta Blaj (PSD)
- Area: 35.28 km^{2} (13.62 sq mi)
- Elevation: 222 m (728 ft)
- Population (2021-12-01): 3,890
  - Density: 110/km^{2} (286/sq mi)
- Time zone: UTC+02:00 (EET)
  - Summer (DST): UTC+03:00 (EEST)
- Postal code: 617070
- Area code: +(40) 233
- Vehicle reg.: NT
- Website: www.comunabotesti.ro

Botești is a commune in Neamț County, Western Moldavia, Romania. It is composed of three villages: Barticești, Botești, and Nisiporești. It included four other villages until 2004, when they were split off to form Văleni Commune.

The commune is located in the eastern part of Neamț County, 23 km (14 mi) northwest of Roman and 45 km (28 mi) east of the county seat, Piatra Neamț, on the border with Iași County.

Historical population
Year	Pop.	±%
2002	4,700	—
2011	4,989	+6.1%
2021	3,890	−22.0%
Source: Census data

In 2002, the commune had a population of 4,700, of which 95.2% were ethnic Romanian and 4.7% Roma; 67.1% were Roman Catholic and 32.8% were Romanian Orthodox. At the 2011 census, the population had increased to 4,989, with 97.21% Romanians. At the 2021 census, Botești had a population of 3,890; of those, 90.33% were Romanians.

== Natives ==
- Veronica Antal (1935 – 1958), Catholic martyr, beatified in 2018
