= Technical Chamber of Greece =

Technical organization of Greece

- Τεχνικό Επιμελητήριο Ελλάδος

Agency overview
- Formed: November 27, 1923; 102 years ago
- Jurisdiction: Government of the Hellenic Republic
- Headquarters: Nikis 4, Athens, Greece; 37°58′35″N 23°44′00″E
- Agency executives: Nikolaos Milis, President; Antonios Protonotarios, Vice President
- Parent department: Ministry of the Environment and Energy
- Child agency: Institute of Technical Chamber of Greece - Fund of Engineers and Public Works Contractors NPO
- Website: Greek: web.tee.gr; English: www.tee.gr/en/

The Technical Chamber of Greece (TCG; Greek: Τεχνικό Επιμελητήριο Ελλάδας, ΤΕΕ, TEE) is the Greek professional organization that serves as the official technical advisor of the Greek state and is responsible for awarding professional licences to all practicing engineers in Greece. It is a public legal entity with elected administration, supervised by the Hellenic Ministry of Environment, Physical Planning and Public Works. The Technical Chamber of Greece is a member of the European Council of Applied Sciences and Engineering.

It was founded in 1923 by the alumni of the National Technical University of Athens.
