= 1933 in Romania =

- Decades: 1910s; 1920s; 1930s; 1940s; 1950s
- See also: Other events of 1933; History of Romania; Timeline of Romanian history; Years in Romania

Events from the year 1933 in Romania. The year saw the Grivița strikes, the formation of the Little Entente, and the assassination of the Prime Minister Ion G. Duca.

== Incumbents ==
- King: Carol II.
- Prime Minister:
  - Iuliu Maniu (until 13 January)
  - Alexandru Vaida-Voevod (14 January to 13 November)
  - Ion G. Duca (from 14 November to 29 December)
  - Constantin Angelescu (interim, from 30 December).

== Events ==
- 17 January – Alexandru Vaida-Voevod introduces the third sacrificial curve, reducing wages by 10 to 12.5 percent, which leads to widespread demonstrations.
- 28 January – The first in a series of Grivița Workshops strikes leads to confrontations between workers and government soldiers.
- 15–16 February – The army breaks up the Grivița Workshops strikes and arrests the Communist leadership, which includes future Romanian President Gheorghe Gheorghiu-Dej.
- 16 February – Czechoslovakia, Romania and Yugoslavia sign the Pact of Organisation forming the Little Entente. The organisation is ratified on 30 May at the same time as a Permanent Council of the States is created.
- 11 June – Romania wins the Balkan Cup for the third time, with Gheorghe Ciolac and scoring the most goals in the tournament.
- 15 September – Ștefan Tătărescu, leader of the National Socialist Party and brother of future Prime Minister Gheorghe Tătărescu, visits Adolf Hitler in Germany, supported by Romanian Minister Foreign Affairs, Nicolae Titulescu, as part of a wider objective to undermine the Little Entente.
- 10 December – The government of Prime Minister Ion G. Duca dissolves the Iron Guard.
- 29 December – Returning from Peleș Castle after meeting the king, Duca is assassinated by an Iron Guard death squad at Sinaia railway station.
- 30 December – The National Liberal Party wins the general election.

== Births ==
- 31 March – Nichita Stănescu, poet and essayist (died 1983).
- 15 May – Andrei Blaier, film director and screenwriter (died 2011).
- 14 June – Dumitru Pârvulescu, Greco-Roman wrestler who won a gold medal in the 1960 Summer Olympics and bronze in 1964 (died 2007).
- 16 July – Gheorghe Cozorici, actor (died 1993).
- 30 July – Ciprian Foiaș, mathematician (died 2020).
- 21 August – Cadrie Nurmambet, Romanian-born Crimean Tatar folk singer and folklorist.
- 20 October – Emilia Vătășoiu, artistic gymnast that won bronze medals at both the 1956 and 1960 Summer Olympics.
- 20 October – Ion Dichiseanu, actor (died 2021).
- 9 November – Lucian Pintilie, film, opera and theatre director of the Romanian New Wave (died 2018).
- 26 November – Ella Zeller, table tennis player, winner of six gold medals at the World Table Tennis Championships.

== Deaths ==
- 25 April – Mina Minovici, forensic scientist (born 1858).
- 22 May – Ștefan Dimitrescu, Post-Impressionist painter (born 1886).
- 29 December – Ion G. Duca, Prime Minister (born 1879).
- Unknown – Calypso Botez, suffragist and women's rights activist (born 1880).
