= Cornelia Tăutu =

Romanian composer (1938–2019)

Cornelia Tăutu (10 March 1938 – 24 March 2019) was a Romanian composer best known for film soundtracks.

== Biography ==
Cornelia Tăutu was born in Odorhei, Romania in 1938. She studied both music composition and pedagogy at the National University of Music in Bucharest, and was a student of Aurel Stroe, Anatol Vieru, and Mihail Jora. She then worked at both the Dialectological Research Institute and the Institute of Ethnological as a researcher for a time before traveling to New York City in 1971 to study composition at Long Island University with Raoul Pleskov.

== Works ==
Tăutu has written works including:

- Divertisment folcloric
- Coralia for children's chorus and orchestra
- Rota for chamber ensemble
- De Doi (The Two) for viola and cello (1994)

Her music has been recorded and issued on CD including:

- Romanian Women Composers 2, Musica Nova and the Romanian Radio Broadcasting Corporation, 2006
- MARIN CONSTANTIN, Electrecord
- Romania Today (June 30, 1998) by Dinescu, Dediu, Stroe, Brumariu, et al., Pro Viva (Ger), ASIN: B000007TAJ

=== Filmography ===
Tăutu has composed music for films including:

- 1992 Ramînerea
- 1988 Drumet în calea lupilor
- 1988 The Moromete Family
- 1987 Cetatea ascunsa
- 1987 Zloty pociag
- 1983 Caruta cu mere
- 1983 Impossible Love
- 1980 Dumbrava minunata
- 1978 Actiunea Autobuzul
- 1978 Buzduganul cu trei peceti
- 1978 Together Again
- 1975 Patima
