= Maria Chefaliady-Taban =

Romanian pianist and music educator

Maria Chefaliady-Taban (4 November 1863 – 11 June 1932) was a Romanian pianist, music educator and composer. She composed romantic-style works with folk elements, typified by her choral composition Hora cărturarului Urechia (Scholar Urechia's Ring Dance). She performed Bach, Schumann, Beethoven and Greig as a concert pianist, and taught singing. Students of Chefaliady-Taban include Mircea Stefanescu.

== Life ==
Chefaliady-Taban was born in Iaşi and studied at the Iaşi Conservatory, studying piano with Anetta Boscoff and theory and solfege with Enrico Mezetti. She continued her studies from 1883–85 in Vienna with Joseph Dachs, Joseph Gansbacher, Adolf Prosnitz and Joseph Hellmesberger at the Akademie fur Musik und Darstellende Kunst. Chefaliady-Taban was offered a scholarship to stay another year in Vienna, but was homesick for Romania. On her return to Bucharest she married Vasile Taban, a cashier at the Ministry of Finance, but the couple divorced after five years.

After completing her studies, Chefaliady-Taban performed as a concert pianist, debuting on 11 November 1880, and performing works by Bach, Schumann, Beethoven and Greig. She appeared at the Romanian Athenaeum and the National Theatre, and performed on an Erard Piano that she had specially commissioned in Paris. Later she became a singing teacher in Iasi and Bucharest, teaching at the Humpel Girls' Institute. Students of Chefaliady-Taban include Adelina Kneisel, Julieta Missir, Aurelia Protopopescu and Mircea Stefanescu.

Chefaliady-Taban died in Bucharest on the 11 June 1932, aged sixty-nine.

== Works ==
Chefaliady-Taban's style has been called romantic, and she incorporated folk-lore into her compositions. She composed choral works and songs. Selected works include:

- Hora carturarului Urechia (Scholar Urechia’s Ring Dance) choral work (1901)
- Imnul studentilor universitari romani (Romanian Students’ Anthem) (1901)
- Atit de frageda (So Tender) (1900)
- O, ramii (Oh, don’t Go) (1905)
