= Elisabeta Ionescu =

Romanian handball player (1953–2019)

Elisabeta Ionescu (20 March 1953 – 4 June 2019) was a Romanian handball player who competed in the 1976 Summer Olympics.

She was part of the Romanian handball team, which finished fourth in the Olympic tournament. She played all five matches.

== Early life ==
Elisabeth Ionescu was a member of Romania's selected winners of the silver medal at the Women's Handball World Championship in 1973, held in Yugoslavia and of the Romanians who ranked fourth in the 1975 Women's Handball World Championship USSR.

Following an analysis session with all coaches of women handball teams, held in 1975 after the World Championship, it was established by open vote the rankings in the wider ranks of the selected Romanians. The ranking of the porters was as follows: Lidia Stan (37 votes), Ionescu (30 votes), Viorica Ionică (20 votes), Clara Bartok (10 votes), Doina Copotz (8 votes) In 1976, the 22 players elected by vote were watched in training matches and in the domestic championship, and the group was then confined to 16 players with whom the final stage of homogenization and training was attacked.

Ionescu was ultimately selected to be part of the 14 of the Romanian handball national team which won the fourth place at the 1976 Montreal Summer Olympics. She played in all five matches.

Ionescu was called for the first time in 1971 to the national team of Romania, for which she played a total of 81 games.
