= Marius Todericiu =

Romanian footballer and coach (1970–2019)

Personal information
- Date of birth: 17 June 1970
- Place of birth: Brașov, Romania
- Date of death: 8 August 2019 (aged 49)
- Place of death: Mannheim, Germany
- Height: 1.94 m (6 ft 4 in)
- Position: Goalkeeper

Senior career*
Years	Team	Apps	(Gls)
1989–1993	FC Brașov		
1993–1995	Kickers Offenbach	32	(0)
1995–1996	1. FC Schweinfurt 05	32	(0)
1996	FSV Salmrohr	8	(0)
1997–1998	SC Weismain	28	(0)
1998–2000	Waldhof Mannheim	49	(0)
2000–2001	Hapoel Rishon LeZion		
2002	1. FC Schweinfurt 05		
2002–2004	TSV Crailsheim	34	(0)
2004–2006	Waldhof Mannheim	30	(0)
Total		213	(0)

Managerial career
- 2006–2009: Waldhof Mannheim (goalkeeper coach)
- 2009–2010: Darmstadt 98 (goalkeeper coach)
- 2010–2014: VfR Mannheim (goalkeeper coach)
- 2014–2015: Waldhof Mannheim (goalkeeper coach)
- * Club domestic league appearances and goals

Marius Todericiu (17 June 1970 – 8 August 2019) was a Romanian football player and coach who played as a goalkeeper and spent the majority of his career in Germany.
