= Drug policy of Romania =

The drug policy of Romania changed significantly in 2014 when penalties for a range of drug related offences were reduced. Drug use was not decriminalized but it became possible to avoid a jail sentence. A person convicted of possession for personal use may avoid a jail term by agreeing to an "integrated assistance programme". The penalties for some supply offences were also reduced in 2014.

== Details ==
Since 2014, penalties for drug law offences in Romania have been linked to the type of drug, with higher penalties being imposed for offences related to drugs considered. The legislation also distinguishes between users and addicts, according to diagnosis. Changes to the Penal Code in 2014 reduced some penalty ranges for supply offences.

Drug consumption is not allowed nor any punishment is specified. In the case of possession for personal use, the court can impose a fine or a prison sentence of 3 months to 2 years, or 6 months to 3 years, depending on the type of drug. A drug user who is convicted of any of these offences can avoid punishment by agreeing to attend an integrated assistance programme; the consent of the drug user is a prerequisite for inclusion in the programme. This is clearly defined in the Penal Code from 2014.

All actions related to the production and sale of drugs are punishable by 2 to 7 years' imprisonment, or 5 to 12 years' imprisonment, depending on the type of drug. Similarly, the import or export of drugs is punishable by 3 to 10, or 7 to 15 years' imprisonment.

== See also ==
- Cannabis in Romania
