= 1930 Romanian local elections =

First Romanian election where women could vote

Local elections were held in the Kingdom of Romania on 5 February 1930. At this election women voted for the first time in the history of Romania. 1938 Constitution of Romania extended voting rights to all adult women for the parliamentary elections.
