= Simion Stanciu =

- Born: 23 December 1949; Bucharest, Romania
- Died: 6 July 2010 (aged 60) Geneva, Switzerland
- Genres: Classical, Folk music, Jazz, traditional,
- Occupations: Musician, composer
- Instruments: Pan Flute

Simion Stanciu (23 December 1949 - 6 July 2010), also known by his stage-name Syrinx, was a Romanian Pan flute player and composer, who lived and worked in Switzerland.

== Biography ==
Simion Stanciu was born in Bucharest, Romania, into a musical family. His father was a cellist, and his brothers were also instrumentalists. He registered at the Bucharest conservatory, initially studying the violin, but from 14 years of age onwards, he increasingly concentrated on playing the Pan pipes.

Due to his education in classical music, he was able to make a new repertory accessible for this instrument, which hitherto was only significant in the folk music traditions of various countries and in popular music. He chose his stage name, which not only signifies the nymph Syrinx in ancient Greek mythology, but also the Pan flute itself.

The range of Stanciu's repertoire included Baroque and Classical instrumental concerts (Vivaldi, Bach, Mozart etc.) adapted for the Pan flute, collaborations with rock music artists like Patrick Moraz, as well as recordings in the fields of Jazz and light music. He also performed the soundtrack recording for the film Quest for Fire.

Among his recordings : Syrinx plays Bach, Mozart, Quantz, with Armin Jordan (conductor) and the Orchestre de chambre de Lausanne, 1985 (Erato NUM 75187).

Stanciu founded the Pan flute school Akademie Syrinx.

He died aged 60 in Geneva, Switzerland, after a protracted illness.
