= Ethnochoreology =

Field of dance study

Ethnochoreology (also dance ethnology, dance anthropology, ethnic dance) is the study of dance through the application of anthropology, musicology, ethnomusicology, and ethnography. Ethnochoreology attempts to apply academic thought to the meaning and motivations of dance.

Ethnochoreology is not just the study or cataloguing of the thousands of external forms of dances—the dance moves, music, costumes, etc.— in various parts of the world, but the attempt to come to grips with dance as existing within the social events of a given community as well as within the cultural history of a community. Dance is not just a static representation of history, not just a repository of meaning, but a producer of meaning each time it is produced—not just a living mirror of a culture, but a shaping part of culture, a power within the culture: "The power of dance rests in acts of performance by dancers and spectators alike, in the process of making sense of dance… and in linking dance experience to other sets of ideas and social experiences."

Dance whether social, ritual or even theatrical, is inherent in a complex web of relationships. He interprets the socially predetermined and meaningful ways of movement and, of course, the history of dance groups in specific societies. In this way dance is "a social text" complex, multifaceted and constantly evolving. Additionally, dance as a social practice acts according to space and time, becoming expressions of everyday life and the respective social structure that comes in contact. Moreover, dance, apart from allowing people to express themselves, is a focal social, cultural process related to human identity, contributes to "structure and diffuse cultural meaning" and can cultivate an interactive and practical narrative imbued with political views.

Ethnochoreology, dance ethnology, and dance anthropology are closely related fields of study, with slightly varying and often overlapping histories and methodologies.

== The history of ethnochoreology and dance anthropology ==
The study of dance anthropology developed out of the work of colonizers, missionaries, and researchers of disciplines such as anthropology and musicology. The first observations of dance in Indigenous and non-Western societies were not necessarily due to dedicated study, rather emerging as byproducts of other anthropological research. In many of the cultures studied, observations on dance could not be ignored due to dance's importance to Indigenous ceremonial life. Many of these observations were speculative, lacking in qualitative or quantitative analysis, and assumed false dichotomies between 'civilized' and 'primitive' societies. In 1933, musicologist Curt Sachs wrote Eine Weltgeschichte des Tanzes (World History of the Dance) in an attempt to provide an analytical framework for the study of dance based in cultural evolution. However, his data was often insufficient or misleading, and therefore his work is no longer considered a viable basis for the study of dance anthropology.

In 1962, the International Council for Traditional Music established a working group that laid the foundations of the field and defined ethnochoreology as a science. Anca Giurchescu, who would later serve as chair of the Study Group on Ethnochoreology from 1998 to 2006, was a member of the 1962 committee. Ethnochoreology originally focused on the national dance traditions and folk dances of specific European countries, but has since expanded to include new urban folk groups and the dance traditions of immigrants.

Modern dancer and anthropologist Gertrude Prokosch Kurath pioneered the specific field of dance ethnology, which developed in America parallel to the development of ethnochoreology in Europe. Kurath considered dance ethnology to be a branch of dance anthropology, and laid its foundations in her 1960 work Panorama of Dance Ethnology: outlining dance ethnology's methods of documentation and analysis, and opening the discussions on dance transmission and diffusion, tradition and innovation, and relation to other aspects of culture. Whereas dance anthropology focused on the study of culture through dance, dance ethnology focused on questions of dance specifically, employing insights into human behavior to answer such questions. Pearl Primus and Katherine Dunham were both notable dancers that bridged the gap between dance performance and dance ethnography.

== Methodological and ethical issues ==
There are many methodological and ethical issues that arise from research in ethnochoreology. Anthropological research in general is a source of contention and suspicion for many Indigenous peoples, as historically it has been used as a tool of colonization, rather than to benefit Indigenous societies. For early anthropologists and missionaries, the research of non-Western cultures and subsequent categorization into Western terms and canon was a method of colonization. For example, many cultures have no generic word for "art", or for "dance". Western dichotomies of art dance vs non-art dance, professional vs hobbyist, and religious vs secular do not necessarily apply to other societies. The assumed transference of such concepts are a method by which Western concepts have been imposed on non-Western societies by anthropologists, art collectors, etc. Some dance ethnologists have tried to rectify this issue by changing their field of inquiry from the term "dance" to broader ideas of "movement systems" and "human movement". Historically, dance anthropology often also fell into the larger category of primitivist thought, suggesting an evolutionary or progressive model of dance. Research along the primitivist vein associates Indigenous peoples with animals and nature more closely than with humanity. The primitivist art movement created a progressive model of art, in which art began with Indigenous art forms and ultimately developed into Western modern art, therefore positing that Western art forms were more socially developed than those of Indigenous peoples.

== See also ==
- Choreomusicology
- Congress on Research in Dance
