= Roxana Briban =

Romanian operatic soprano

Roxana Briban in 2006

Roxana Briban (28 October 1971 – 20 November 2010) was a Romanian operatic soprano.

Born in Bucharest, Briban first became interested in music at the age of six, when she began to sing and play the violin, soon becoming a soloist of the Romanian Radio Children's Choir, which supports over 300 concerts in Romania and abroad. She attended the George Enescu Music High School in Bucharest, which she left in 1995. Later graduating from the National University of Music Bucharest, Briban received awards from the Romanian Musical Forum and the Romanian Radio Broadcasting Company (SRR).

She debuted as a soloist with the Romanian National Opera, Bucharest in 2000 as the Countess in Mozart's The Marriage of Figaro.

She made her international debut as Micaëla in Bizet's Carmen at the Vienna State Opera in 2003, and she continued to appear there until her final season in 2009-2010, where she played the roles of Donna Elvira in Don Giovanni, Mimi in La Bohème, Cio-Cio San in "Madama Butterfly", Amelia Grimaldi in Simon Boccanegra, the Countess in The Marriage of Figaro and Tatiana in Eugene Onegin. She also appeared at the Vienna Volksoper, Deutsche Oper Berlin, the Théâtre du Capitole, the Teatro Municipal de Santiago in Chile and the Muziektheater in Amsterdam.

Also in her repertoire were vocal-symphonic works by Bach, Handel, Beethoven, Brahms, Mendelssohn, Mahler, Shostakovich and Hindemith. Her last public appearance took place at the Royal Palace in Warsaw in Poland, where she performed in a recital in celebration of Romania's National Day, on 1 December 2009.

== Death ==
She committed suicide on 20 November 2010, aged 39, following a period of depression caused, according to her husband Alexandru Briban, whom she married in 1997, by the termination of her contract with the Bucharest National Opera in June 2009. He stated that she had attempted suicide on other occasions and had been receiving treatment.
