= Viorica Ionică =

Romanian handball player (1955–2020)

Viorica Ionică (20 June 1955 – 16 August 2020) was a Romanian handball player who competed in the 1976 Summer Olympics. She was part of the Romanian handball team, which finished fourth in the Olympic tournament. She played all five matches.
