= Vladimir Orloff =

Romanian-Canadian cellist and music teacher (1928–2019)

Vladimir Orloff (May 26, 1928 — April 1, 2019) was a Romanian-Canadian cellist and music teacher.

Born in Ukraine, Orloff graduated at the Bucharest Conservatory in 1947. In 1953, he received the first prize of the Bucharest international competition. In 1957—1964 he widely gave concerts in Romania and other countries. He won 1st prize at the Bucharest International Cello Competition before joining the Vienna Philharmonic in the mid-1960s as a principal cellist.

Orloff appeared as soloist with various European orchestras, including the Bournemouth Symphony Orchestra, the New Philharmonia Orchestra and Paris's ORTF.

From in 1967-1970 he taught at the Vienna Academy of Music. Then, from 1971–1991 he taught at the University of Toronto.

He resided in Canada from 1971 and in 1977 he received Canadian citizenship.

The recordings of Orloff from the 1950s and 1960s, including the concerts of Haydn, Schumann, Saint-Saëns, Elgar, Shostakovich and Khachaturian, were reissued on three CDs in 2006.

Vladimir Orloff died on 1 April 2019, at the age of 90.
