= List of 2008 box office number-one films in Romania =

This is a list of films which have placed number one at the weekend box office in Romania during 2008.

== Number-one films ==
†	This implies the highest-grossing movie of the year.

#	Weekend End Date	Film	Total Weekend Gross (Romanian leu)	Notes
1	January 6, 2008	National Treasure: Book of Secrets	275.526,00	
2	January 13, 2008	Aliens vs. Predator: Requiem	152.123,20	
3	January 20, 2008	I Am Legend	208.278,00	
4	January 27, 2008	The Game Plan	125.405,00	
5	February 3, 2008	Asterix aux Jeux Olympiques (Asterix at the Olympic Games)	198.384,00	
6	February 10, 2008	Charlie Wilson's War	149.866,00	
7	February 17, 2008	Cloverfield	131.284,90	
8	February 24, 2008	Michael Clayton	76.445,30	
9	March 2, 2008	Jumper	160.451,30	
10	March 9, 2008	Jumper	93.179,20	
11	March 16, 2008	10,000 BC	288.101,00	
12	March 23, 2008	10,000 BC	193.665,00	
13	March 30, 2008	The Bank Job	166.874,00	
14	April 6, 2008	Vantage Point	109.370,00	
15	April 13, 2008	Fool's Gold	144.254,00	
16	April 20, 2008	Street Kings (The Night Watchman)	108.246,70	
17	April 27, 2008	Definitely, Maybe	65.300,00	
18	May 4, 2008	Iron Man	177.952,60	
19	May 11, 2008	21	165.711,00	
20	May 18, 2008	Taken	89.362,40	
21	May 25, 2008	Indiana Jones and the Kingdom of the Crystal Skull	352.191,30	
22	June 1, 2008	What Happens in Vegas	164.950,60	
23	June 8, 2008	Sex and the City	205.812,00	
24	June 15, 2008	Sex and the City	177.106,00	
25	June 22, 2008	The Chronicles of Narnia: Prince Caspian	141.345,00	
26	June 29, 2008	Wanted	217.502,20	
27	July 6, 2008	Hancock	306.055,00	
28	July 13, 2008	Hancock	151.972,00	
29	July 20, 2008	Made of Honor	100.727,00	
30	July 27, 2008	The Dark Knight	303.012,00	
31	August 3, 2008	You Don't Mess with the Zohan	153.322,00	
32	August 10, 2008	The Mummy: Tomb of the Dragon Emperor	349.159,85	
33	August 17, 2008	The Mummy: Tomb of the Dragon Emperor	111.121,00	
34	August 24, 2008	The X-Files: I Want to Believe	85.535,43	
35	August 31, 2008	Mamma Mia!	173.243,95	
36	September 7, 2008	Journey to the Center of the Earth †	239.501,00	
37	September 14, 2008	Journey to the Center of the Earth †	267.704,00	
38	September 21, 2008	Righteous Kill	196.609,60	
39	September 28, 2008	Death Race	171.883,65	
40	October 5, 2008	My Best Friend's Girl	137.523,11	
41	October 12, 2008	City of Ember	115.426,30	
42	October 19, 2008	Max Payne	170.074,00	
43	October 26, 2008	Eagle Eye	151.454,50	
44	November 2, 2008	Burn After Reading	149.543,00	
45	November 9, 2008	Quantum of Solace	519.519,00	
46	November 16, 2008	Quantum of Solace	330.900,00	
47	November 23, 2008	Quantum of Solace	205.101,00	
48	November 30, 2008	Madagascar: Escape 2 Africa	426.528,00	
49	December 7, 2008	Madagascar: Escape 2 Africa	191.818,00	
50	December 14, 2008	The Day the Earth Stood Still	317.017,00	
51	December 21, 2008	Four Christmases	204.640,00	
52	December 28, 2008	Bolt	274.591,10	

== Highest-grossing films ==
Highest-grossing films of 2008
Rank	Title	Distributor	Total gross
1	Journey to the Center of the Earth	InterComFilm Distribution	2,658,106
2	Quantum of Solace	InterComFilm Distribution	1,643,975
3	Hancock	InterComFilm Distribution	1,256,197
4	Madagascar: Escape 2 Africa	Ro Image 2000	1,218,956
5	My Best Friend's Girl	MediaPro Distribution	1,211,304
6	The Dark Knight	InterComFilm Distribution	1,176,697
7	The Day the Earth Stood Still	Odeon Cineplex	1,047,192
8	Sex and the City: The Movie	InterComFilm Distribution	1,043,381
9	The Mummy: Tomb of the Dragon Emperor	Ro Image 2000	1,018,456
10	10,000 BC	InterComFilm Distribution	955,421

== See also ==
- List of Romanian films
- List of highest-grossing films in Romania
