= Alexa Mezincescu =

Romanian ballet dancer and choreographer (1936–2019)

Alexa Mezincescu (7 March 1936 – 20 June 2019) was a Romanian ballet dancer and choreographer.

== Life and career ==
Mezincescu trained at the Bucharest Choreography School, and was subsequently sent to train in Leningrad. She was a principal soloist with the Romanian National Opera, where she was noted for her interpretations of Bruckner.

Mezincescu was granted the National Order of Faithful Service by Ion Iliescu.

== Death ==
Mezincescu died on 20 June 2019, at the age of 83.
