= Constantin Frosin =

Romanian-French writer (1952–2020)

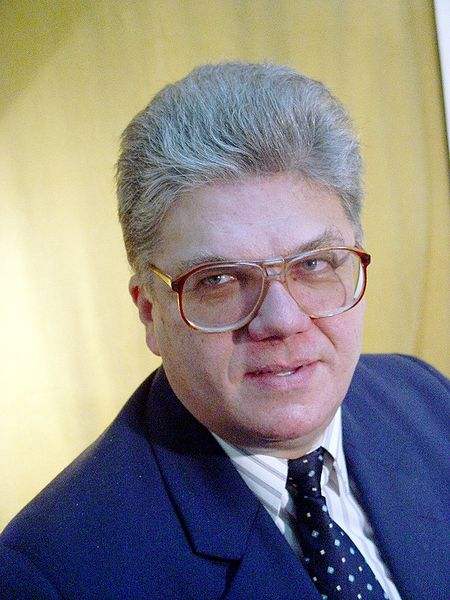
- Constantin Frosin
- Born: 12 October 1952; Herăstrău, Romanian People's Republic
- Died: 10 October 2020 (aged 67); Galați, Romania
- Education: University of Bucharest
- Occupation: Writer

Constantin Frosin (12 October 1952 – 10 October 2020) was a Romanian-French writer and translator.

== Biography ==
Frosin attended the University of Bucharest, where he studied French and Italian. He also earned a doctoral degree in philology. From 2003 to 2005, he served as Dean of the Faculty of Communication and Public Relations at Danubius University in Galați.

Frosin was a member of the Writers' Union of Romania, the Romanian Haiku Society, the Association des Épidémiologistes de Langue Française, and PEN International, as well as many other writing and poetry societies across Europe.

== Prizes ==
- Grand Prix of the Fondation Franco-Roumaine (1994)
- Medal of the European Parliament (1995)
- Prize of the Municipality of Galați (1995)
- Prize of Excellence of the Revista Haiku (1996)
- Grand Prize of the Académie francophone (1999)
- Gold Medal of the Académie Internationale de Lutèce (1999)
- Knight of the Ordre des Arts et des Lettres (2000)
- Officer of the Ordre des Palmes académiques (2004)
- Knight of the Romanian National Order of Merit (2004)
- Gold Medal of the Mérite et Dévouement français (2009)
