= Pnina Granirer =

Romanian-Canadian painter and author (born 1935)

- Born: April 11, 1935 (age 91); Brăila, Romania
- Education: Bezalel Academy of Arts and Design
- Known for: painter and writer
- Notable work: Light within the Shadows; A Painter's Memoir

Pnina Granirer (born April 11, 1935 in Brăila, Romania) is a Romanian-born Canadian painter and writer.

== Life ==
In 1944, as a child, Granirer witnessed the transport ready to take her and other Romanian Jews to the extermination camps. Her life was saved when the Second Jassy–Kishinev Offensive saw the Red Army drove out Nazi German forces. After World War II, Granirer's family were "sold" to Israel by the Romanian government. She emigrated to Israel, where she attended the Bezalel Academy of Arts and Design. After completing her degree, she moved to Vancouver, British Columbia in 1965.

== Career ==
Her works have been exhibited and collected nationally and internationally. Granirer founded the Artists in Our Midst, the first art walk in Vancouver, in 1993. Her book, Light within the Shadows; A Painter's Memoir, was published in May 2017.

=== Selected exhibitions ===
==== Solo ====
1998-95	In Search of Eden Prince George Art Gallery, Prince George, British Columbia; Torres Gallery, Vancouver, British Columbia
1998	Pnina Granirer - Celebrating a Life's Work, a 40 Year Survey Richmond Art Gallery, Richmond, British Columbia
1997	Synchronicity Oktavia Gallery, Vancouver, British Columbia
1995	Pacific Exchanges Dr. Sun Yat Sen Garden, Vancouver, British Columbia Pnina Granirer - 1985-1995, A Survey Zack Gallery, Vancouver, British Columbia
1993	Juxtapositions Richmond Art Gallery, Richmond, British Columbia Heart of Stone Art Centre of New Westminster, New Westminster, British Columbia

==== Group ====
1998	Art '98 Vancouver, British Columbia
1997	Ars Mundi - 4th International Conference of the Visual Arts Vancouver, British Columbia
1997-93	Artists in Our Midst Vancouver, British Columbia
1996	Quay Gallery - Gibsons, British Columbia A Child's View Richmond Art Gallery, Richmond, British Columbia
1995	A Jewish Beaux Arts Zack Gallery, Vancouver, British Columbia
