= Never Mind the Balkans, Here's Romania =

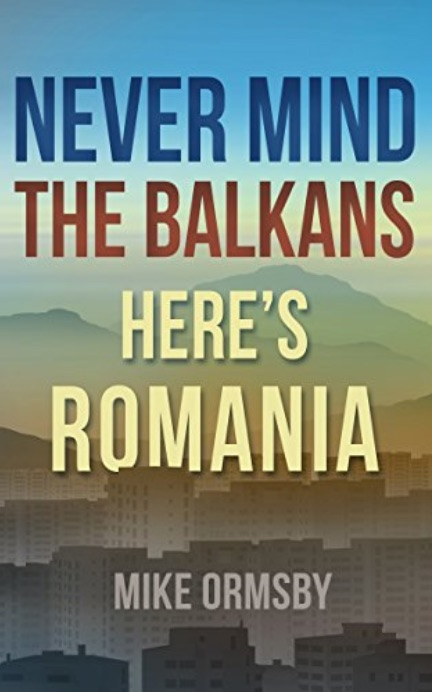
- Cover design by Sorin Sorasan
- Author: Mike Ormsby
- Language: English
- Subject: Life in modern Romania, urban & rural.
- Genre: Short story, true-life fiction, tragicomedy
- Publisher: Mike Ormsby/Amazon
- Publication date: May 2008, E-book June 2012
- Publication place: Romania
- Pages: 280
- ISBN: 978-973-7841-56-8

Never Mind the Balkans, Here's Romania is a collection of 57 short stories by Mike Ormsby, published by Editura Compania in Bucharest, Romania in May 2008, with an E-book version published on Amazon in June 2012. The Romanian language version Grand Bazar România sau Călător străin updated, translated by Vlad A. Arghir, was published simultaneously. The book gained significant and widespread attention from Romania's literary critics in print, broadcast and online media. Most praised its realistic tone, tragicomic style and accessible format.

Some reviewers described the author as 'a British Ion Luca Caragiale', and one perceived a direct link to foreign travel writers of previous centuries in Romania, such as John Paget, James Henry Skene, Emily Gerard and Sacheverell Sitwell. Another likened Ormsby's style to that of a portrait artist, and, in terms of contemporary peers, he was compared to Irish writer Philip Ó Ceallaigh. However, one journalist suggested that the book represents an indictment of Romania by a foreign guest. General public response to the book was positive, at home and abroad. Three of Ormsby's stories were subsequently included in the 2011 anthology Bucharest Tales, published by New Europe Writers.

== Plot summary ==
Based on the author's personal experiences in urban and rural Romania over a fourteen-year period between 1994 and 2008, the book consists of a series of vignettes delineating various aspects of modern Romanian life. A narrator tells the stories in the first person, using the present tense, and is closely linked to the events and characters portrayed, often with unexpected results. He describes encounters with taxi drivers, the new rich, teenagers, notaries, lawyers, waiters, musicians, friends, families, association presidents, politicians, etc. Settings range from Bucharest to Transylvania, from the mountains to the coast. In two stories, the narrator meets or observes Romanians abroad. The tone throughout is wry but empathetic, with elements of bittersweet comedy, danger and, on one occasion, violence, when interests and ideals clash. Most of the stories contain an allegorical twist, inviting wider interpretation.

== Major Themes ==
The overriding theme is Romania's progress from former Communist dictatorship to a democracy within the European Union. The country's socio-cultural, economic and political transition provides the backdrop for a range of overlapping and often opposing sub-themes drawn from everyday life in town and country, home and abroad. These include new wealth; endemic poverty; bureaucracy; civil society; apartment block politics; hospitality; self-interest; compassion; authority; manners; petty corruption; service culture; the remnants of the 'communist' mindset; child-care; road safety; animal welfare; travel; hospitality; classical and popular music; work and leisure activities (notably jogging); ethnic minorities; gender issues; baptism and funeral rites.

== Characters ==
Most characters are composites of several real people and appear in only one story. Some characters feature in several stories, such as 'Lumi', the narrator's helpful neighbour. A minority of characters are based on sole, real persons whose names/milieu were changed to protect privacy.

== Literary significance and reception ==
Most Romanian literary critics, general readers and Romanophiles both in Romania and abroad, have responded positively to the book . However, some readers feel it is too close to the bone or gives a negative impression of the country. The author embarked on a reading tour of five Romanian cities (Cluj-Napoca, Timișoara, Sibiu, Deva and Bucharest) in June 2008, and his writing received national media coverage.

Raluca Ion, writing in Romania's daily broadsheet Cotidianul was one of the first critics to link Ormsby to one of Romania's most influential writers:

Romania has found itself a British Caragiale. The book makes you die laughing at our national failings, the sort that drive some less-tolerant Romanians abroad.

— Raluca Ion, book review in Cotidianul

The book was reviewed in some detail in the fortnightly national newspaper “Formula AS”, whose literary critic Adriana Bittel detected a clarity of purpose and lack of pretension:

Mike Ormsby has not the slightest intention of flattering us, nor of treating us with the superiority of those coming from the civilised world to the backward East. He insists on writing exactly what he sees, lives and feels in today's colourful Romania. He's likeable, lucid, with a big soul and a lot of humour. The English journalist offers neither a façade, nor caricature, but reality - today's Romania.

— Adriana Bittel, book review in “Formula AS”

Robert Balan, in his review for the national daily Gîndul, on 23 June 2008, suggested that Ormsby's approach revamps a literary tradition stretching back to the 19th and 20th centuries:

Ormsby does not write about the ‘eternal and fascinating Romania’ of tourist guidebooks but about attending tenants’ meetings, and about taxi drivers. In the current absence of humorous testimony on such contemporary details, 'Grand Bazar România' can be compared with the work of travel writers in centuries past.

— Rober Balan, book review in “Gîndul”

David Shepard, a Romanian-in-exile reviewing the book for a Romanian tourism website in New South Wales, Australia, felt that Ormsby had encapsulated a modern cultural crossroads: "Never Mind the Balkans, Here’s Romania highlights the confluence of Romania’s deeply entrenched cultural traditions as they meet the new freedoms, temptations and commercialism that comes with being the newest nation in the European Union."

In 2009, literary critic Dan C. Mihailescu reviewed the book during his daily ProTV show Omul care aduce cartea (The man who brings the book). Mihailescu calls Ormsby "a very nice man who loves Romania but is baffled by our behavior." Mentioning several of the stories and reading a passage describing the Romanian countryside, Mihailescu says the ending of the book is "divine", where Ormsby recalls a Caragiale character and hopes, like him, to find a job "chasing flies from Cişmigiu Gardens."

Despite widespread praise in the media, not everybody was impressed. The national daily România liberă followed up its initial, positive May 2008 review in România liberă with a profile interview six months later, in which journalist Cristian Curus suggests to Ormsby that he had come to Romania to criticize it. The author explains that he had come as a BBC reporter, returned to teach journalism, settled in the country and written the book after Romanian friends urged him to record his anecdotes in print.
