= Constantin Dan Vasiliu =

Romanian politician (1951–2020)

- Born: 15 February 1951; Bârlad, Vaslui County, Romania
- Died: 6 November 2020 (aged 69); Iași, Romania
- Occupations: Economist, Politician
- Spouse: Ecaterina Vasiliu
- Children: Anca Maria Velio
- Parent(s): Mihai (Melu) Vasiliu (1924–1984); Lucia Vasiliu (née Perida)

Constantin Dan Vasiliu (15 February 1951 – 6 November 2020) was a Romanian politician.

== Career ==
He was born in Bârlad, Romania, and was the son of Mihai (Melu) Vasiliu and of Lucia Vasiliu (née Perida). He studied economics at the Alexandru Ioan Cuza University of Iași. After graduation, he worked at the Tepro Company in Iași where he eventually was promoted to Commercial Director of the company. After 1989, Constantin Dan Vasiliu entered politics.

In 1992, he was elected senator for the National Salvation Front; in this capacity, he was vice president of the Senate of Romania from 1994 to 1996. Re-elected in 1996 on the lists of the Democratic Party, he was chairman of the parliamentary group of the Democratic Party. From 1996 to 2000 he was also secretary of the senate's "Budget, Finance and Banking Commission". In 2000 he was re-elected vice president of the Senate.

Constantin Dan Vasiliu also was vice chairman of the "Romanian-Australian Friendship Group" and member of the "Group for the Friendship between Romania and the Republic of Moldova".

From 2000 to 2004 he was advisor to the Senate of Romania. He was also Secretary General of the Senate. In 2013 he was sent on a mission at the Romanian Embassy of Tunisia as secretary general where he remained in duty until 2017.

He was leader of the Democratic Liberal Party organization of Iași County.
