= Tamara Hareven =

American historian

Tamara Kern Hareven (May 10, 1937 – October 18, 2002) was a social historian who wrote extensively on the history of the family and the effects of social changes on family lives. Her books include Families, History and Social Change and Aging and Generational Relations. Born in Chernivtsi, Romania (now Ukraine), and of Jewish origin, she died of kidney failure at the age of 65.

== Early life and education ==
At the age of four, Hareven and her parents were forced to leave their home in Chernivtsi and live in an internment camp in Ukraine due to their Jewish heritage. Hareven and her family survived the Holocaust, and eventually relocated to Palestine. Hareven's early life contributed to her familiarity with languages including German, French, and English, in addition to her native Romanian and Hebrew.

Hareven earned her B.A. at the Hebrew University of Jerusalem in 1960 and her M.A. in Medieval Jewish history at the University of Cincinnati in 1962. She completed her PhD at Ohio State University in American history with a dissertation on Eleanor Roosevelt's role as a social reformer. This research led to the publication of her first book, Eleanor Roosevelt: An American Conscience (1968). She worked with her Ph.D. advisor John H. Bremner and others on Children and Youth in America, a seminal three volume collection that launched the field of the history of childhood. She was among the founders in North America of the history of the family as a serious field of study. She taught at Dalhousie University in Canada briefly before moving to Clark University in Worcester, Massachusetts.

== Professional career ==
Hareven was a major figure in establishing the field of family history. Before the 1970s, studies of history focused primarily on individuals in positions of power and status in society, such as politicians, military leaders, and those in the upper social classes. Hareven and her colleagues worked to legitimize the day-to-day experiences of "ordinary" people in the working classes as a valid and worthy part of the United States. Hareven was particularly interested in the role of the family as a liaison between individuals and industrial society.

In 1973, while at Clark, she organized a major international conference on the History of the Family. An outgrowth of the conference, a newsletter focused on the history of the family developed into the Journal of Family History in 1975. She later played a role in establishing The History of the Family: An International Quarterly. Her support for the work of younger scholars was a strong and consistent part of her career.

Between 1972 and 1977, Hareven and a group of student assistants conducted hundreds of intensive oral history interviews with former employees of the Amoskeag Manufacturing Company. In the course of this research, Hareven met Randolph Langenbach, an architectural historian and photographer, who was in the process of recording New England industrial buildings for historical preservation. Hareven and Langenbach collaborated on several projects, including Amoskeag: Life and Work in an American Factory City (1978), a result of Hareven's oral history interviews. The two were married in 1973, and eventually divorced ten years later. Hareven would continue to publish her research on the Amoskeag with her 1982 book Family Time and Industrial Time: The Relationship Between the Family and Work in a New England Industrial Community. Containing statistical research gleaned from her interviews, company records, and patterns of familial relationships, the publication argued that industrial settings like the factory failed to cause a breakdown of family structure, a claim that went against prevailing scholarly ideas.

While working on the two publications mentioned above, Hareven strived to expand the boundaries of her research. From 1979 to 1983, she joined forces with anthropologist Kathleen M. Adams to conduct additional oral history interviews with children, spouses, siblings, and parents of former Amoskeag workers. This new project enabled Hareven to continue tracing lifecourse transitions through several generations of the same family. Repeatedly, she determined that the family did not conform blindly to industrial processes, but maintained and used personal ties to adapt the factory environment to their own needs. Hareven published several articles and book chapters related to this research, which were intended to culminate in a sequel to Family Time and Industrial Time. This volume was unfinished at the time of her death.

In the early 1980s Hareven was a Fulbright Scholar in Japan. Her travels were motivated by a cross-cultural comparative study to determine whether her findings about New England communities were consistent in other industrial settings around the globe. On her first trip to Japan in 1981, Hareven discovered Nishijin, the silk-weaving district of Kyoto, Japan, which would consume her research for the next ten years. In addition to conducting extensive oral history interviews with Japanese silk weavers, Hareven immersed herself in Japanese culture during her visits. She also guest lectured at Doshisha University in Kyoto. Her research in Japan led to her last book, The Silk Weavers of Kyoto: Family and Work in a Changing traditional Industry, which was published after her death in 2002.

In 1988 Hareven left Clark University to accept a position as professor in the Individual and Family Studies department at the University of Delaware. Hareven's papers are held today at the University of Delaware.

== Selected works ==
- (ed.). Family and Kin in Urban Communities, 1700-1930 (1977). ISBN 9780531055922
- Amoskeag: Life and Work in an American Factory-City, with Randolph Langenbach (1978, reissued in 1995). ISBN 9780394488417
- (ed.). Themes in the history of the family (1978). ISBN 9780912296159
- (ed.). Transitions: The Family and the Life Course in Historical Perspective (1978). ISBN 9780123251503
- Family Time and Industrial Time: The Relationship Between the Family and Work in a New England Industrial Community (1982, reissued in 1995). ISBN 9780521230940
- (ed.). Aging and Generational Relations: Life-Course and Cross-Cultural Perspectives (1996). ISBN 9780202305608
- Families, History and Social Change: Life Course and Cross-Cultural Perspectives (2000). ISBN 9780813390871
- Silk Weavers of Kyoto: Family and Work in a Changing Traditional Industry (2002). ISBN 9780520228177
