= Florin-Teodor Tănăsescu =

Romanian electrical engineer

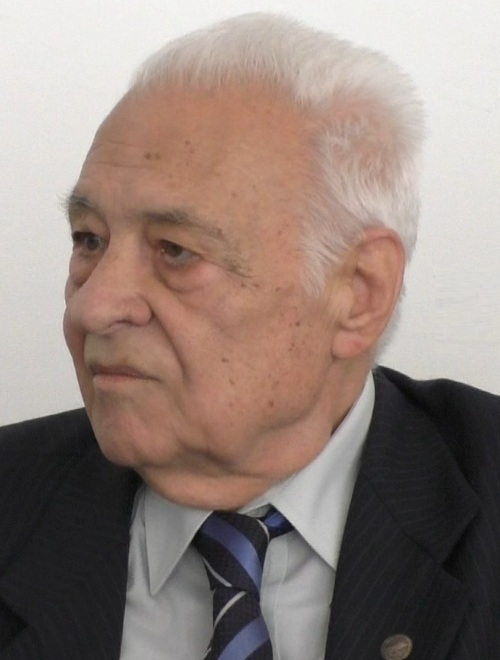
- Born: 12 April 1932 (age 93); Bârlad, Romania
- Occupation(s): Electrical Engineer, Professor, Researcher, Inventor.
- Spouse: Constantina Tănăsescu
- Children: Cătălin Tănăsescu (b. 1962); Cătălina (Carmen) Ionel (b. 1963)
- Parent(s): Dumitru Tănăsescu; Cecilia Tănăsescu (née Dragomir)

Florin-Teodor Tănăsescu (born 12 April 1932) is a Romanian electrical engineer, professor at the Politehnica University of Bucharest.

== Early life ==
Tănăsescu was born in Bârlad. His father, Dumitru Tănăsescu, was a lawyer, being also known for his hobby of apiculturist. His mother Cecilia Tănăsescu (born Dragomir (1902–1986) was teacher of history in Bârlad and Buzău. Florin-Teodor Tănăsescu studied engineering at the Faculty of Electrotehnics of the Politechnic Institute of Bucharest graduating in 1956. He defended the thesis in the field of electrical measures for his doctorate in 1968, at the Gheorghe Asachi Technical University of Iaşi.

== Career ==
Florin-Teodor Tănăsescu started his professional activity as research engineer at the "Research and Design Institute for the Electrotechnic Industry" (Institutul de Cercetări şi Proiectări pentru Industria Electrotehnică – ICPE"). He rose through the ranks until he reached the position of Director General of the institute. His research concentrated on high voltage electrical equipment, new energy sources, electrotechnology and partial electrical discharge in electrical insulating systems. He has patented over 35 inventions. He is also professor at the University Politehnica of Bucharest and the Valahia University in Târgovişte.

At the national level, Florin-Teodor Tănăsescu was coordinator of the national policy for scientific research in the "National Council for Science and Technology" (Consiliului Naţional pentru Ştiinţă şi Tehnologie – CNŞT) (1985–1987) and was secretary of state in the Ministry of Education (1992–1996). He is editor in chief of the technical magazine "Electrotehnica-Electronica-Automatica".

Florin-Teodor Tănăsescu is member of the International Council on Large Electric Systems (CIGRE) and of the World Energy Conference – WEC. He is honorary member of the Academy of Sciences of Moldova

Florin-Teodor Tănăsescu had an important contribution to the activity of scientific societies in Romania. In 1986 he was elected chairman of the National Committee of the International Electrotechnical Commission – IEC. He is active in the team working on the "IEC Thesaurus". He is founding member of the CNR – CME (Romanian National Committee of World Energy Council) and of the Romanian Telework Society He is also secretary general of the Romanian Academy of Technical Sciences. He is member of the executive board of the General Association of Romanian Engineers (AGIR) for 2006–2009. He is chairman of the "Association for Terminology" (TERMROM)

During his activity Florin-Teodor Tănăsescu received different awards and distinctions. In 1970 he was awarded the Traian Vuia prize of the Romanian Academy. He is recipient of the honor diploma of the National Authority for Scientific Research (Authoritatea Naţională pentru Cercetare Ştiinţifică).

Florin-Teodor Tănăsescu has published 10 books and over 125 scientific articles.

== Works ==
- The Modern Problems of Electrostatics with Applications in environment protection – with Ion I. Inculet and Radu Cramariuc – Kluwer Academic Pub, 1999
- Repere ale ingineriei româneşti – with Mihai Mihăiţă, and Mihai Olteneanu – Editura AGIR, București 2000
