= Dorel Zugrăvescu =

Romanian geophysicist (1930–2019)

Dorel Zugrăvescu (25 November 1930 – 20 November 2019) was a Romanian geophysicist who was elected a corresponding member of the Romanian Academy in 1991, and was an honorary member of the Academy of Sciences of Moldova.

== Studies ==
Born in Râmnicu Vâlcea, he graduated from the Bucharest Mining Institute (Institutul de Mine București), Faculty of Geophysics (1948–1954). He became a doctor in sciences, with a geophysics specialty, at the University of Bucharest, with the thesis "Contributions to the geodynamic study of the Romanian territory" (Contribuții la studiul geodinamic al teritoriului României), in 1985, and got a doctor in sciences, in the alternative medicine specialization, in 1987.

== Professional activity ==
Zugrăvescu started by being a scientific researcher at Institutul de Fizică (1955–1965), then principal scientific researcher at Centrul de Cercetări Geofizice al Academiei Române (1965–1968), head of laboratory at the Geodynamics Laboratory, from Centrul de Cercetări Geofizice al Academiei Române (1968–1970), at the Astronomical Observatory în Bucharest (1970–1977), at Centrul de Fizica Pământului (1977–1990), Principal Investigator I; director at Institutul de Geodinamică [Sabba S. Ștefănescu] al Academiei Române (since 1990).

Since 1977 he had been working as an associate professor in the Department of Geophysics at the University of Bucharest, and since 1990 he had been a Ph.D. supervisor in the Physics branch, specializing in Global Physics. He died in Constanța, aged 88.
