= Tatiana Nicolescu =

Romanian literary historian

Tatiana Nicolescu is a Romanian historian of literature and translator, born in Chişinău on 9 July 1932. She was a professor at the University of Bucharest, also teaching at Moscow University during the 1970s. She specialized in Russian literature in Bucharest and in Romanian literature and language in Moscow. Since 1988 she has been a visiting professor at the University Institute of Modern Languages in Milan, Italy. She is the wife of George Cristea Nicolescu.

== Books ==
- The literary dead of Gogol in Romania (1959) (in Romanian)
- Tolstoy and Romanian literature (1963) (in Romanian)
- Soviet contemporary writers (1968) (in Romanian)
- I.A. Bunin (1970) (in Romanian)
- On the scale of time (1972) (in Romanian)
- Articles and researches in "Secolul XX" (in Romanian)
- Andrei Belyi, a preface to a Romanian edition "Multum in parvo" (1975) (in Romanian)
- Articles and research in "Voprosy Literatury" (in Russian)
- Andrei Belyi and theatre. Moscow, Radix Eds., 1995, 204 pp. (in Russian)
