= Raoul Pleskow =

Austrian-born American composer (1930–2022)

Raoul Pleskow (October 12, 1930 – May 18, 2022) was an Austrian-born American composer.

Pleskow was born in Vienna, Austria on October 12, 1930. He moved to the United States in 1939 and became an American citizen in 1945. He studied at the Juilliard School in New York City (1950–1952), and at Queens College (1952–1956), where he studied composition with Karol Rathaus. He then studied with Otto Luening at Columbia University, earning a Master's degree in Music in 1958. In 1959 he was appointed to the music faculty at C. W. Post College, Long Island University, and in 1970 he became a full professor.

Pleskow's compositions number around 150. He died in Manhasset, New York on May 18, 2022, at the age of 91.
