= Cannabis in Romania =

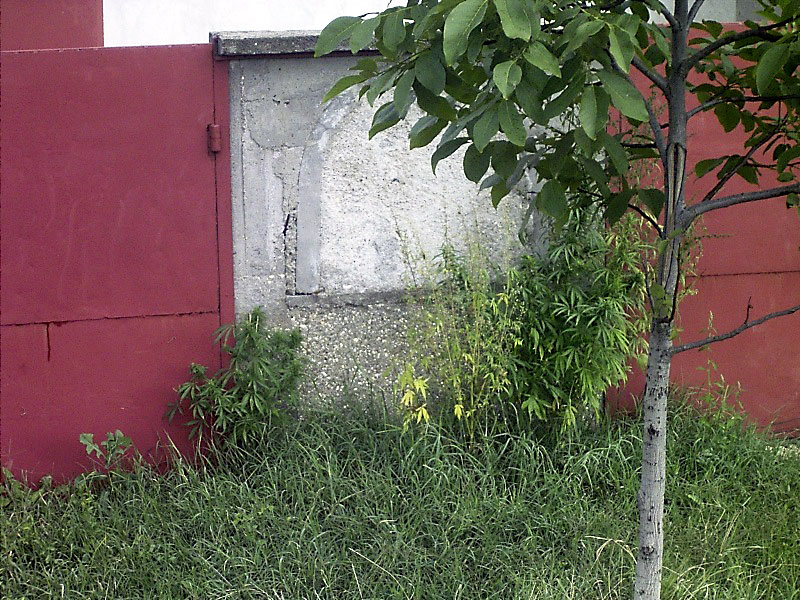
Cannabis in Romania, 2004

Cannabis in Romania is illegal for recreational and for medical use. Although it was technically legalized for medical use in 2013, it has not been eliminated from the Table I of High Risk Drugs, and as such its use is prohibited.

Some of the earliest evidence of the psychoactive use of cannabis have been found in Romania, including the archaeological sites of Frumușica and Gurbănești.

== Prohibition ==
In 1928, Romania established laws for countering narcotics, including hashish and its preparations.

== Medical cannabis ==
A limited medical cannabis law was passed in 2013, allowing for the use of low-THC (below 0.2%) derivatives of the plant only. While medical cannabis cannot be prescribed by doctors in Romania, because no such medication has been made available to the market, the Romanian Government has made it clear that cannabis of any potency will be accepted, if doctors from the rest of the EU prescribed it.

In July 2024, a Romanian couple residing in the United Kingdom, were detained and interrogated for several hours at Bucharest Henri Coandă Airport. (Note: Mentioned in the source under its older name, Otopeni airport. (Bucharest Otopeni International Airport)) They were subsequently charged for the import of illicit drugs into the country by DIICOT, and had their cannabis seized by the agency, despite having the relevant medical documents. The indictment and seizure were later overturned by the Bucharest Court of Appeal.

== Advocacy for reform ==
Save Romania Union Youth was the first youth organisation of a Romanian political party to openly support the decriminalisation of cannabis.

In 2023, the REPER party held the "3grame" initiative, which proposed a law that would make possession of up to 3 grams of cannabis into a misdemeanor, instead of a criminal offense. The draft law received negative evaluations from all reviewing committees and was ultimately rejected (Note: The Camera Deputatilor website is region locked to Romania.). Other groups, such as groups Incoltim Buruieni have also been advocating to decriminalize cannabis in the country.

== Major offences ==
Romania has experienced several significant cases involving the large-scale cultivation and trafficking of cannabis. The quantities reported in these cases are not always directly comparable, as some refer to the green mass of living or freshly harvested plants, while others refer to dried cannabis or cannabis buds.

- 2019 – Giurgiu. On 6 October 2019, border police at the Giurgiu Border Crossing Point discovered approximately 750 kg of plant material suspected to be cannabis inside a minibus registered in Serbia. The material was sent to the Romanian Police's Laboratory of Drug Analysis and Profiling, where testing confirmed that it was cannabis. The case was investigated by the Directorate for Investigating Organized Crime and Terrorism (DIICOT) and organized crime officers as a case of the illegal introduction of high-risk drugs into Romania. Romanian authorities estimated that the cannabis would have been worth approximately €9 million on the black market.
- 2022 – Bihor. In August 2022, DIICOT prosecutors and police discovered a large cannabis cultivation operation in Bihor County. Two greenhouses contained 2,628 cannabis plants, with the reported plant material weighing approximately 203 kg. The cultivation site was equipped with irrigation, ventilation and lighting systems and was allegedly intended for the production and sale of drugs.
- 2022 – Caraș-Severin. In September 2022, DIICOT prosecutors and police conducted searches in Caraș-Severin County and discovered a cannabis plantation consisting of 97 plants with a green mass of more than 150 kg, together with more than 50 kg of cannabis buds. The total reported quantity therefore exceeded 200 kg. Two men were placed in pre-trial detention in connection with the investigation into drug trafficking.
- 2023 – Neamț. In October 2023, DIICOT prosecutors and organized crime officers in Neamț County discovered a large cannabis plantation concealed in a cornfield. Authorities reported approximately 1.2 tonnes of cannabis plants, as well as additional quantities of cannabis, including approximately 59 kg found in a greenhouse and 18.5 kg found in an abandoned house. The investigation resulted in the detention of several suspects.
- 2023 – Timiș. In October 2023, DIICOT prosecutors and police discovered a large outdoor cannabis plantation in Timiș County, covering approximately 3,000–4,000 m². The plantation was concealed in dense vegetation near a river and was equipped with an extensive irrigation system and concealed live-feed surveillance cameras. Searches resulted in the seizure of approximately 400 kg of green cannabis plant material, 60 kg of cannabis buds and 68 kg of cannabis packaged in one-kilogram vacuum-sealed bags. Eight suspects were detained in connection with the investigation.
- 2025 – Arad and Cluj. In July 2025, DIICOT prosecutors announced an investigation into the alleged importation of approximately 170 kg of cannabis and 5 kg of cocaine from Spain into Romania. The drugs were concealed in a commercial shipment containing tiles and coffee machines and were discovered inside four coffee machines in Arad County. Investigators also alleged that the same suspect had previously brought approximately 80 kg of cannabis into Romania in June 2025, which was subsequently stored in Cluj-Napoca. Two men were placed in pre-trial detention in connection with the case.
- 2026 – Dragomirești, Neamț. In July 2026, police and DIICOT prosecutors discovered a large greenhouse in Dragomirești, Neamț County, measuring approximately 170 × 10 m and containing 2,669 cannabis plants with a reported green mass of approximately 2.4 tonnes. A separate area at the site was equipped for drying, processing, portioning and packaging cannabis. Authorities also seized 88 kg of dried plant material, 400 g of cannabis buds, 50 g of cannabis resin and 50 g of frozen cannabis. Two people were detained and investigated for drug trafficking and complicity in drug trafficking.
