= 1926 in Romania =

- Decades: 1900s; 1910s; 1920s; 1930s; 1940s
- See also: Other events of 1926; History of Romania; Timeline of Romanian history; Years in Romania

Events from the year 1926 in Romania. The year saw improved relationships between Romania and Poland and Queen Maria's visit to the United States, while at home the dynastic crisis continued.

== Incumbents ==
- King: Ferdinand I
- Prime Minister:
  - Ion I. C. Brătianu (until 26 March).
  - Alexandru Averescu (from 26 March).

== Events ==
- 5 January – The Romanian dynastic crisis continues as an Act of Parliament confirms that Prince Carol renounces his right to succeed King Ferdinand.
- 26 March – In Bucharest, Romania and Poland sign a Treaty on Mutual Assistance against Aggression and on Military Aid, building the Polish–Romanian alliance.
- 10 October – The Romanian National Party (Partidul Național Român, PNR) and the Peasants' Party (Partidul Țărănesc, PȚ) merge to form the National Peasants' Party. The party subsequently dominated Romanian politics from 1928 to 1933.
- 18 October – Queen Maria, accompanied by Prince Nicholas and Princess Ileana disembark in New York for a tour the United States.

== Births ==
- 4 January – Margareta Niculescu, puppeteer and theatre director (died 2018).
- 20 February – Magda Herzberger, author, poet and composer, educator and survivor of the Holocaust (died 2021).
- 23 March – Ștefan Gheorghiu, violinist (died 2010).
- 4 May – Geta Brătescu, visual artist who worked with drawing, textiles, performance and film (died 2018).
- 8 June – Anatol Vieru, composer (died 1998).
- 19 June – Elisabeth Axmann, writer and critic (died 2015).
- 1 July – Gheorghe Ursu, construction engineer, poet, diarist, and dissident (died 1985).
- 11 August – Cornel Trăilescu, opera composer and conductor (died 2019).
- 5 September – Carmen Petra Basacopol, composer (died 2023).
- 25 October – Josine Ianco-Starrels, art curator and museum director (died 2019).
- 25 October – Christine Valmy, entrepreneur and esthetician (died 2015).
- 25 December – Myra Landau, artist and abstract painter (died 2018).

== Deaths ==
- 27 February – Elena Theodorini, mezzo-soprano and soprano (born 1857).
- 19 October – Victor Babeș, bacteriologist and physician (born 1854).
- 18 November – Alexandru C. Constantinescu, politician (born 1859).
