= 2005 in Romania =

- Decades: 1980s; 1990s; 2000s; 2010s; 2020s
- See also: Other events of 2005; History of Romania; Timeline of Romanian history; Years in Romania

Events from the year 2005 in Romania.

== Incumbents ==
- President: Traian Băsescu
- Prime Minister: Călin Popescu-Tăriceanu

== Events ==
- 28 April - The MTV Romania Music Awards 2005 ceremony is held at Sala Palatului.
- 21 May - Luminiţa Anghel & Sistem represent Romania in the Eurovision Song Contest in Ukraine, with the song "Let Me Try"; they finish third.
- 4 June - The Civic Forum of the Romanians of Covasna, Harghita and Mureș is founded.
- November - The People's Party is formed by Corneliu Ciontu.
- 16 December - The Romanian Church United with Rome, Greek-Catholic, is elevated to the rank of a Major Archiepiscopal Church by Pope Benedict XVI.
- December - President Traian Băsescu and United States Secretary of State Condoleezza Rice sign an agreement that will allow a U.S. military presence at several Romanian facilities primarily in the eastern part of the country.

== Deaths ==
- 16 March – Sergiu Cunescu, politician, the leader of the Social Democratic Party of Romania (PSDR) (born 1923)
- 25 August – Aurora Gruescu, the world's first female forestry engineer (born 1914)
- 2 September – Alexandru Paleologu, essayist, literary critic, diplomat and politician (born 1919)

== See also ==
- 2005 in Europe
- Romania in the Eurovision Song Contest 2005
