= 1918 in Romania =

- Decades: 1890s; 1900s; 1910s; 1920s; 1930s
- See also: Other events of 1918; History of Romania; Timeline of Romanian history; Years in Romania

Events from the year 1918 in Romania.

== Incumbents ==
- King: Carol I.
- Prime Minister:
  - Ion I. C. Brătianu (until 26 January).
  - Alexandru Averescu (from 29 January to 4 March).
  - Alexandru Marghiloman (from 5 March to 23 October).
  - Constantin Coandă (from 24 October to 29 November).
  - Ion I. C. Brătianu (from 29 November).

== Events ==
- 3 April – League of the People (Liga Poporulu), later renamed People's Party (Partidul Poporului), is founded by Alexandru Averescu.
- 7 May – The Treaty of Bucharest is signed with the Central Powers following the stalemate reached after the campaign of 1917.
- 9 November – The Romanian government issues an ultimatum to all foreign troops, requiring that they leave the country.
- 10 November – Romania re-enters the war on the side of the Allies.
- 6 December – The 1918 Romanian typographers' strike, when Bucharest's typographers strike for higher salaries, an 8-hour work day, and recognition of their union.
- 7 December – Brașov is occupied by the Romanian Army.
- 11 December – Ferdinand I signs the Law regarding the Union of Transylvania, Banat, Crișana, the Satmar and Maramureș with the Kingdom of Romania, completing the Union of Transylvania with Romania.
