= 2011 in Romania =

- Decades: 1990s; 2000s; 2010s; 2020s
- See also: Other events of 2011; History of Romania; Timeline of Romanian history; Years in Romania

Events in the year 2011 in Romania.

== Incumbents ==
- President: Traian Băsescu
- Prime Minister: Emil Boc

== Events ==
- 17 April – Action 2012, a coalition of organizations supporting unification between Moldova and Romania, is founded.
- October 20–31 – 2011 Romanian census

== Arts and entertainment ==
In music: Romania in the Eurovision Song Contest 2011, List of Romanian Top 100 top 10 singles in 2011.

== Sports ==
Football (soccer) competitions: Liga I, Liga II, Cupa României (Final). Romania hosted the 2011 UEFA European Under-19 Football Championship.

In ice hockey: MOL Liga season.

== Deaths ==
=== January ===
- January 1 – Constantin Marin, 85, musician, conductor, and composer (born 1925)
- January 10 – Liana Alexandra, 63, composer, pianist, and music educator (born 1947).
- January 18 – Cristian Pațurcă, 46, composer (born 1964)
- January 19 – Mihai Ionescu, 74, footballer (born 1936)
- January 27 – Liana Dumitrescu, 38, politician (born 1973)
- January 31 – Bartolomeu Anania, 89, Romanian Orthodox bishop, Metropolitan of Cluj, Alba, Crișana and Maramureș (born 1921)

=== February ===
- February 4 – Vasile Paraschiv, 82, political activist and dissident (born 1928).
- February 22 – Ion Hobana, 80, science fiction author (born 1931).

=== March ===
- March 1 – Ion Monea, 70, Olympic silver (1968) and bronze (1960) medal-winning boxer (born 1940).
- March 23 – Teodor Negoiță, 63, polar explorer and scientist (born 1947).

=== May ===
- May 2 – Ion Barbu, 72, football player (born 1938).
- May 8 – George Guțiu, 87, Greek-Catholic hierarch, Archbishop of Cluj-Gherla from 1994 to 2002 (born 1924).
- May 16 – Serghei Covaliov, 66, Olympic gold (1968) and silver (1972) medal-winning canoeist (born 1944).
- May 22 – Alexandru Ene, 82, football player (born 1928).
- May 24 – Fănuș Neagu, 79, novelist, journalist, and short story writer (born 1932).

=== December ===
- December 1 – Andrei Blaier, 78, film director and screenwriter (born 1933)

== See also ==
- 2011 in the European Union
- 2011 in Europe
- Romania in the Eurovision Song Contest 2011
- List of 2011 box office number-one films in Romania
