= 1919 in Romania =

- Decades: 1890s; 1900s; 1910s; 1920s; 1930s
- See also: Other events of 1919; History of Romania; Timeline of Romanian history; Years in Romania

Events from the year 1919 in Romania.

== Incumbents ==
- King: Carol I.
- Prime Minister:
  - Ion I. C. Brătianu (until 27 September).
  - Artur Văitoianu (from 1 October to 30 November).
  - Alexandru Vaida-Voevod (from 1 December).
