= 1921 in Romania =

- Decades: 1900s; 1910s; 1920s; 1930s; 1940s
- See also: Other events of 1921; History of Romania; Timeline of Romanian history; Years in Romania

Events from the year 1921 in Romania. The year saw the formation of the Romanian Communist Party out of the Socialist Party and subsequent imprisonment of the Communist leadership.

== Incumbents ==
- King: Ferdinand I.
- Prime Minister:
  - Alexandru Averescu (until 17 December).
  - Take Ionescu (from 17 December).

== Events ==
- 2 February – Nicolae Bretan's opera Luceafărul is first performed at Romanian National Opera, Cluj-Napoca.
- February – Elena Bacaloglu signs an agreement with Benito Mussolini, founding the National Italo-Romanian Fascist Movement (Mișcarea Națională Fascistă Italo-Română).
- 3 March – The Convention of Romanian–Polish Defensive Alliance is signed in Bucharest, which came into force on 25 July, cementing the Polish–Romanian alliance.
- 8 May – At the congress of the Socialist Party of Romania (Partidul Socialist din România), the pro-Bolshevik faction affirms control of the party, which consequently joins Communist International and is renamed the Romanian Communist Party (Partidul Comunist Român).
- 12 May – The police arrest the leaders of the Romanian Communist Party, initiating the Dealul Spirii Trial.
- 6 July – The Hungarian Union (Uniunea Maghiara) is founded with Sámuel Jósika as its first president.
- 20 July – The Victory Medal is established, a design subsequently copied by France in the 1914–1918 Inter-Allied Victory medal.
- 13 December – 100 people die when a building is bombed in Bolhrad.

== Births ==
- 5 January – Tissa David, animator, designer of Raggedy Ann (died 2012).
- 14 February – Toma Arnăuțoiu, officer who led a group of anti-communist resistance fighters from 1949 to 1958, executed at Jilava Prison in 1959.
- 17 February – Vera Clejan, literary critic and translator (died 2013).
- 10 March – Lisa Ferraday, model and actor (died 2004).
- 21 June – Greta Deligdisch, advocate for Holocaust survivors (died 2020).
- 9 August – Lola Bobesco, violinist (died 2003).
- 24 October – Veronica Schwefelberg, pen name Veronica Porumbacu, poet and translator (died 1977).
- 25 October – Prince Michael (died 2017).

== Deaths ==
- 13 December – Ana Conta-Kernbach, writer and women's rights activist (born 1865).
