= 2007 in Romania =

- Decades: 1980s; 1990s; 2000s; 2010s; 2020s
- See also: Other events of 2007; History of Romania; Timeline of Romanian history; Years in Romania

Events from the year 2007 in Romania.

== Incumbents ==
- President: Traian Băsescu
- Prime Minister: Călin Popescu-Tăriceanu

== Events ==
- 1 January – Romania becomes a member state of the European Union, together with neighbouring Bulgaria.
- 5 April – The second Tăriceanu cabinet was sworn in, as a PNL-UDMR minority government (unlike in the preceding cabinet, the PD and the PC are not part of the coalition).
- 19 April – President Traian Băsescu was suspended by the Romanian Parliament, of which members accused him of violating the Constitution of Romania even though the Constitutional Court didn't find any evidence of such violation. With this suspension, Băsescu became the first president of Romania in its history since 1989 that was suspended at least once.
- 19 May – 2007 Romanian presidential impeachment referendum: 75.06% of the referendum voters voted for Traian Băsescu to remain President, while the other 24.94% voted for the impeachment.
- 30 August – The case of what could become among the most covered of the kind in the history of Romanian mass media, the disappearance of Elodia Ghinescu, begins.
- 14 September – 2 dead and 15 injured after an explosion occurred in a block of flats in Zalău, Sălaj County.
- 25 November:
  - 2007 European Parliament election in Romania: The Democratic Party wins the first election for the European Parliament in Romania with 28.81% of all votes (13 seats). The Social Democratic Party came in second with 23.11% (10 seats), followed by the PNL (13.44%, 6 seats), PLD (7.78%, 3 seats) and UDMR (5.52%, 2 seats).
  - 2007 Romanian electoral system referendum: 81.36% of voters of the referendum voted "for" the changing of the Romanian electoral system to a two-round system. The voter turnout was 26.51%, causing the referendum to be invalid.
- 15 December – The Democratic Party (PD) and the Liberal Democratic Party (PLD) parties have merged to form the Democratic Liberal Party (PDL).

== Births ==
- 28 January – Amalia Ghigoarță, artistic gymnast

== Deaths ==
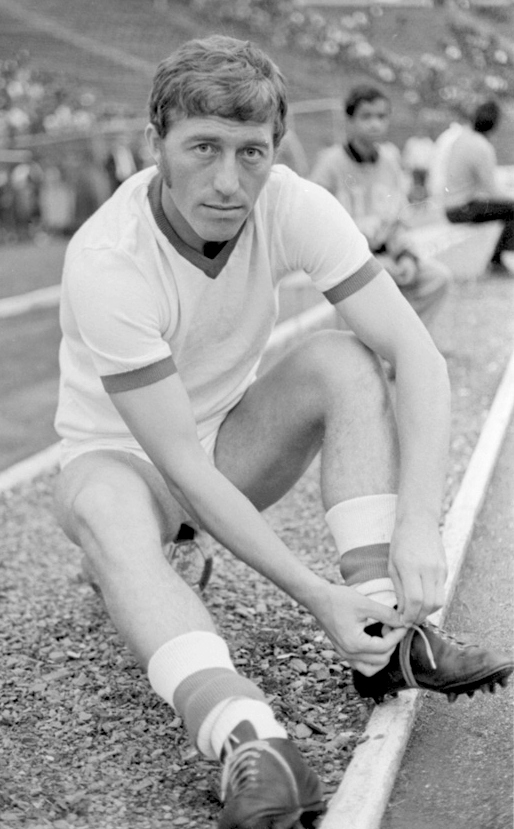
Nicolae Dobrin

- 9 January – Ion Dincă, communist politician and former Mayor of Bucharest (born 1928)
- 21 January – Maria Cioncan, runner and medalist at 2004 Summer Olympics (born 1977)
- 17 April – János Szántay, Olympic fencer (born 1922)
- 17 April – Gil Dobrică, singer (born 1946)
- 26 April – Florea Dumitrache, footballer (born 1948)
- 7 May – Octavian Paler, Romanian writer, journalist, politician and activist.
- 8 June – Adrian Pintea, actor (born 1954)
- 26 July – Mircea Puta, mathematician (born 1950)
- 26 October – Nicolae Dobrin, footballer (born 1947)
- 8 December – Ioan Fiscuteanu, theater and film actor (born 1937)
- 14 December – Mihai Pelin, writer and historian (born 1940)

== See also ==
- 2007 in the European Union
- 2007 in Europe
- Romania in the Eurovision Song Contest 2007
- Romania in the Junior Eurovision Song Contest 2007
