= Stroiești =

Stroieşti may refer to several places in Romania:

- Stroieşti, a commune in Suceava County
- Stroieşti, a village in Lunca Commune, Botoşani County
- Stroieşti, a village in Arcani Commune, Gorj County
- Stroieşti, a village in Tătărăni Commune, Vaslui County

and to:

- Stroieşti, a commune in Transnistria, Moldova

== See also ==
- Stroe (disambiguation)
- Stroești (disambiguation)
- Strointsi (disambiguation)
