= Hungarian Union =

Hungarian Union may refer to:

- Hungarian Union (Romania)
- Hungarian Union (Serbia)
