= 1924 in Romania =

- Decades: 1900s; 1910s; 1920s; 1930s; 1940s
- See also: Other events of 1924; History of Romania; Timeline of Romanian history; Years in Romania

Events from the year 1924 in Romania. The year saw the first time that the country competed as a team in the Summer Olympic Games, and, although the country won no medals, Romania went on to enter every subsequent game apart from 1932 Summer Olympics.

== Incumbents ==
- King: Ferdinand I.
- Prime Minister: Ion I. C. Brătianu.

== Events ==
- 1 January – The Aeronautica Regală Română (ARR), or Romanian Royal Aeronautics, is founded.
- 29 March – Rioters in Bucharest target Jews in anti-semitic attacks that continued through the night into the next morning.
- 3 April – The Italian government issues Romania with an ultimatum requiring a payment of 80 million Italian lira for outstanding debts. Several Regia Marina warships are stationed off the port of Constanța to back up the demand.
- 10 April – King Ferdinand and Queen Marie arrive in Paris on a royal visit. Though officially only a friendly visit, it was believed that Romania was seeking an alliance with France as a counter to unfriendly relations with Italy, Russia and Spain.
- 11 April – The Romanian government bans the Romanian Communist Party.
- 16 April – Romania announces it has settled its debts with Italy.
- 27 May – The Romania national football team compete for the first time in the 1924 Summer Olympics. They are defeated 6–0 by the Netherlands.
- 29 May – An ammunition depot explodes in Cotroceni, causing $3 million damage to the Royal Palace and other buildings.
- 5 July – Romania enters the Summer Olympics for the first time as a team. Although the team does not receive any medals, the country goes on to compete in every game apart from the 1932 games .
- 10 August – Romania is one of the nine countries represented at the first First International Silent Games held in Paris.
- 12 October – The declaration of the Moldavian Autonomous Soviet Socialist Republic heightens tensions between Moldovans and Romanians.
- 25 November – The Bucharest government vote one million lei to construct a crematorium.
- 23 December – Nicolae Bretan's opera Golem is first performed at the Hungarian Theater in Cluj.

== Births ==
- 2 January – Victor Mercea, nuclear physicist (died 1987).
- 15 February – Kemal Karpat, historian and professor at the University of Wisconsin–Madison (died 2019).
- 20 February – Eugen Barbu, novelist, short story writer, and journalist (died 1993).
- 8 March – Alma Redlinger, painter and illustrator (died 2017).
- 15 June – Hédi Szmuk, Swedish-Romanian author and psychologist, survivor of Nazi concentration camps (died 2022).
- 15 August – Selma Meerbaum-Eisinger, poet (died 1942).
- 26 August – Elena Moldovan Popoviciu, mathematician (died 2009).
- 8 September – Solange d'Herbez de la Tour, architect.
- 5 October – Marianne Fillenz, neuroscientist (died 2012).
- 27 November – Renée Annie Cassian-Mătăsaru, pen name Nina Cassian, children's author, journalist, poet, translator and film critic (died 2014).
- 17 December – Alexander Bickel, legal scholar and expert on the United States Constitution (died 1974).

== Deaths ==
- 15 April – Eduard Caudella, composer (born 1841).
- 19 October – Iancu Flondor, politician who advocated the Union of Bukovina with Romania (born 1865).
- 22 October – Wilhelm Knechtel, botanist and numismatist (born 1837).
