= 2004 in Romania =

- Decades: 1980s; 1990s; 2000s; 2010s; 2020s
- See also: Other events of 2004; History of Romania; Timeline of Romanian history; Years in Romania

Events from the year 2004 in Romania.

== Incumbents ==
- President: Ion Iliescu (until 20 December), Traian Băsescu (starting 20 December)
- Prime Minister:
  - until 21 December: Adrian Năstase
  - 21 December-28 December: Eugen Bejinariu
  - 29 December: Călin Popescu-Tăriceanu

== Events ==
- 26 March – Seven countries in Eastern Europe, including Romania, become official members of NATO.
- 3 May – For the International Tennis Federation 2004 men's circuit, an event is held in Bucharest.
- 14 to 16 May – The 2004 European Judo Championships are held in Bucharest.
- 24 May – 18 people are killed and 13 seriously injured after a truck loaded with ammonium nitrate explodes in Mihăilești, Buzău County.
- 6 June – First round of the local election.
- 16 June – Prime Minister Adrian Năstase inaugurates works on the A3 motorway.
- 20 June – Second round of the local election.
- 13 to 29 August – At the 2004 Summer Olympics, Romanian athletes earn a total of 19 medals.
- 27 October – A magnitude 6 earthquake strikes Vrancea County, without causing casualties and significant material damage. This is the strongest earthquake recorded in Romania in the 21st century at the time.
- 28 November – First round of the presidential election: Adrian Năstase 40.97%, Traian Băsescu 33.86%.
- 12 December – Second round of the presidential election designates Traian Băsescu winner (51.23%), thus being elected the third president of post-revolutionary Romania.
- 28 December – The government led by newly appointed prime minister Călin Popescu-Tăriceanu is validated by the Romanian Parliament.

== Births ==
- 18 June – Giuliano Stroe, gymnast and bodybuilder
- 15 September – David Popovici, Romanian competitive swimmer
- 9 October – Theodor Andrei, Romanian singer-songwriter (Eurovision 2023)

== Deaths ==
- 7 March – Nicolae Cajal, physician and academic (born 1919).
- 18 March – Radu Manicatide, engineer and aircraft constructor (born 1912).
- October – Virgil Bărbuceanu, equestrian who competed at the 1956 and 1960 Summer Olympics (born 1927).

== See also ==
- 2004 in Europe
- Romania in the Eurovision Song Contest 2004
- Romania at the 2004 Summer Olympics
- Romania at the 2004 Summer Paralympics
