= Stroești (disambiguation) =

Stroești may refer to several places in Romania:

- Stroești, a commune in Vâlcea County
- Stroești, a village in Mușătești Commune, Argeș County
- Stroești, a village in Pătârlagele town, Buzău County
- Stroești, a village in Todirești Commune, Iași County
- Stroești, a village in Florești Commune, Mehedinți County

and to:

- Stroești, the Romanian name for Strointsi Commune, Chernivtsi Oblast, Ukraine

== See also ==
- Stroe (disambiguation)
- Stroiești (disambiguation)
