= Stroe =

Stroe may refer to:

== Places ==
- Stroe, Gelderland, a village in the Netherlands
- Stroe, North Holland, a village in the Netherlands
- Stroe, a tributary of the river Nechit in Romania

== Name ==
=== Romanian surname ===
- Aurel Stroe (1932–2008)
- Corneliu Stroe (1949–2017)
- Giuliano Stroe (born 2004)
- Radu Stroe (1949–2025), Romanian navigational engineer and politician

=== Romanian male given name ===
- Stroe Belloescu (1838–1912)

== See also ==
- Stroești (disambiguation)
- Stroiești (disambiguation)
