= 2014 in Romania =

- Decades: 1990s; 2000s; 2010s; 2020s
- See also: Other events of 2014; History of Romania; Timeline of Romanian history; Years in Romania

This is a list of 2014 events that occurred in Romania.

== Incumbents ==
- President – Traian Băsescu (until 21 December) · Klaus Iohannis (since 21 December)
- Prime Minister – Victor Ponta

== Events ==
=== January ===
- 6 January – Former Prime Minister of Romania, Adrian Năstase, is sentenced to four years imprisonment for bribe taking in the Zambaccian file. His wife, Dana Năstase, is also sentenced to three years imprisonment with suspension. Moreover, they are forced to pay damages of 700,000 euros.
- 15 January – The Constitutional Court unanimously decides that the changes to the Penal Code in "Black Tuesday" are unconstitutional.
- 20 January
  - Six people, including three children, are killed after their car plunges into a lake near the Cernavodă Nuclear Power Plant.
  - Two people are killed and five injured after a medical aircraft crashes near Beliș, Cluj County.
- 23 January – Interior Minister Radu Stroe resigns after accusations of mismanagement of rescue operations for survivors of the Apuseni Mountains plane crash.
- 25 January – A snowstorm engulfs southern Romania, disrupting traffic on major national roads and killing at least 13 people. For the first time in the history of Romanian meteorology, authorities establish red code for blizzard and decree state of alert in three counties.
- 30 January – Former Transport Minister Relu Fenechiu is sentenced to five years imprisonment for corruption in the Transformer file.

=== February ===
- 6 February – Daniel Chițoiu resigns from functions of Deputy Prime Minister and Minister of Finance.
- 25 February – Romania's ruling coalition collapses as PNL leaves Government and asks current Prime Minister Victor Ponta to resign.

=== March ===
- 4 March
  - Crin Antonescu resigns as President of the Senate and demands the resignation of Prime Minister Victor Ponta.
  - Gheorghe Popescu and seven others, among them Mihai Stoica, are convicted by a Romanian appeals court of money laundering and tax evasion in connection with the transfer of football players from Romania to other countries.
- 10 March – Law enforcers are attacked with stones and firecrackers during a meeting commemorating the Szeklers killed in 1854. The meeting takes place in Târgu Mureș and is attended by more than 4,000 people.
- 12 March – 102 house searches occur in 18 counties within the pale of Meat Mafia file. Hundreds of tons of meat are withdrawn from the market or destroyed.
- 14 March – After incidents in Târgu Mureș and displaced statements of Hungarian extremist leaders, Romanian authorities decide the interdiction of entry into the country of Hungarian citizens from four formations, including Jobbik.

=== April ===
- 5 April – Three dancers die burned alive and four other people are injured in a devastating fire at a restaurant in Constanța.
- 22 April – Four people are killed and two others are missing after days of heavy rainfall caused widespread flooding in the south of the country.

=== May ===
- 25 May – PSD-PC-UNPR alliance obtains 37.4% of votes in the European Parliament election, being followed by PNL with 14.86%, PDL with 12.23%, independent Mircea Diaconu with 6.92%, UDMR with 6.47% and PMP with 6.21%.
- 26 May
  - Crin Antonescu announces his resignation as President of PNL, invoking poor results at the European Parliament election.
  - PNL leadership votes the transition from ALDE to EPP, and merge with PDL.

=== June ===
- 13 June – Romanian hacker Guccifer is indicted in absentia in a federal court in the U.S. state of Virginia for hacking into the e-mails of American government officials and family members.
- 16 June – Mugur Isărescu is unanimously advised by joint commissions of Budget, Finance-Banks in Parliament for a fifth term as governor of the National Bank of Romania.
- 18 June – After seven years of complicated investigations, the case of lawyer Elodia Ghinescu concludes. The main suspect of murder, her husband, policeman Cristian Cioacă, is sentenced to 15 years and eight months in prison and payment of 380,000 euros injury.
- 21 June – Authorities constitute a crisis cell inasmuch as over 1,000 Romanian tourists are stranded on the Bulgarian littoral, severely affected by floods and mudslides in recent days.
- 25 June – Both houses of the Romanian parliament widely adopt a joint statement urging President Traian Băsescu to resign, following corruption scandals involving his arrested brother's graft case and one of his sons-in-law's implication in a criminal investigation.

=== July ===
- 29 July – Two people die and several hundreds are forced to evacuate as surging floodwaters submerge villages in Oltenia.

=== August ===
- 8 August – Businessman Dan Voiculescu is sentenced to 10 years imprisonment for the fraudulent privatization of the Institute of Food Research, after which the state was prejudiced with 60 million euros.
- 21 August
  - The governments of Romania and Hungary sign a framework agreement for opening 20 cross-border roads, strengthening traffic links with the entire European Union.
  - The first case of bluetongue disease in Romanian history is reported in Buzău County.
- 27 August – The Iași–Ungheni gas pipeline is inaugurated in the presence of the prime ministers of Romania and Moldova. The pipeline was built to ensure Moldova's energy independence from Russia.

=== September ===
- 15 September
  - A strong Mediterranean cyclone hits southwestern Romania, causing widespread flooding and leaving one man dead and two others missing.
  - Romanian Ornithological Society announces that a population of sand boa (Eryx jaculus) was recently discovered in the Danube Valley, after 80 years since this species has not been seen alive in Romania.

=== October ===
- 8 October – Stefan W. Hell, a physicist of Romanian origin, receives the Nobel Prize in Chemistry "for the development of super-resolved fluorescence microscopy", together with Eric Betzig and William E. Moerner.
- 10 October – The first land-based U.S. missile shield opens in Deveselu, Olt County.
- 11 October – Over 60 people are injured in violences between the galleries of Romania and Hungary before the UEFA Euro 2016 qualifier between the two countries.
- 12 October – More than 10,000 people attend the March for Bessarabia in Bucharest, demanding the unification of Romania and Moldova.
- 21 October – The most powerful laser in Europe and the second worldwide, of one petawatt, is inaugurated at the National Institute for Laser, Plasma and Radiation Physics of Măgurele.

=== November ===
- 2 November – Romanian Prime Minister Victor Ponta, from the ruling Social Democratic Party, and the ethnic German mayor of Sibiu Klaus Iohannis, from the opposition Christian Liberal alliance, will face a 16 November runoff, with the incumbent Social Democratic premier favored to win.
- 16 November – Voters in Romania go to the polls for the second round of the presidential election with Klaus Iohannis scoring an upset victory over current Prime Minister Victor Ponta.
- 18 November – Teodor Meleșcanu becomes the second Foreign Minister of Romania in just eight days to resign because of organizational problems which have left thousands of Romanians abroad unable to vote in the elections.
- 21 November – A military helicopter crashes in Sibiu County, killing nine people on board.
- 22 November – A magnitude 5.7 earthquake strikes Vrancea County, causing light damage and power outages in epicentral area. Eight people in Galați and one in Tulcea were transported to hospital with minor injuries or panic attacks.

=== December ===
- 15 December – A medical helicopter belonging SMURD crashes into Lake Siutghiol, killing all four people on board. Prefect of Constanța County Radu Volcinschi is dismissed as a result of poor rescue operations.
- 17 December
  - A GEO allowing politicians to switch between parties is declared by CCR unconstitutional. About 500 local elected migrated to PSD, under this Ordinance, before the presidential election.
  - OMV Petrom and Hunt Oil Company discover the biggest oil and gas deposit in 30 years in the southern part of Buzău County.
- 21 December – President Klaus Iohannis takes oath of office in solemn session of the Senate and the Chamber of Deputies.
- 29 December – Russian group Gazprom cuts gas supplies to Romania by 30% of the contracted quantity.

== Deaths ==
=== January ===
- 1 January – Traian T. Coșovei, poet (b. 1954)
- 13 January – Mihai Fotino, actor (b. 1930)
- 20 January – Adrian Iovan, aviator (b. 1959)
- 26 January – Cicerone Ionițoiu, civic activist and memoirist (b. 1924)
- 30 January – Marioara Murărescu, producer of folklore programs (b. 1947)

=== February ===
- 3 February – Mircea Grosaru, representative of the Italian minority in the Romanian Parliament (b. 1952)
- 18 February – Ruxandra Sireteanu, actress (b. 1943)
- 24 February – Nicolae Herlea, baritone (b. 1927)
- 25 February – Emil Simon, conductor and composer (b. 1936)

=== March ===
- 11 March – Doru Tureanu, ice hockey player (b. 1954)
- 12 March – Florin Șlapac, writer, poet and translator (b. 1952)
- 13 March – Aureliu Manea, theater director, actor and writer (b. 1945)
- 15 March – Sorin Ioan, general and Chief of Staff of the Romanian Land Forces (b. 1954)
- 27 March – Augustin Deleanu, footballer (b. 1944)

=== April ===
- 3 April – Andrei Bodiu, poet (b. 1965)
- 4 April – Miruna Boruzescu, costume designer for theater and film (b. 1945)
- 8 April – Ghiță Licu, Olympic handball player (b. 1945)
- 15 April – Nina Cassian, poet, essayist and translator (b. 1924)
- 25 April – Petre Bokor, theater director and writer (b. 1940)
- 27 April – George Astaloș, poet, novelist and playwright (b. 1933)

=== May ===
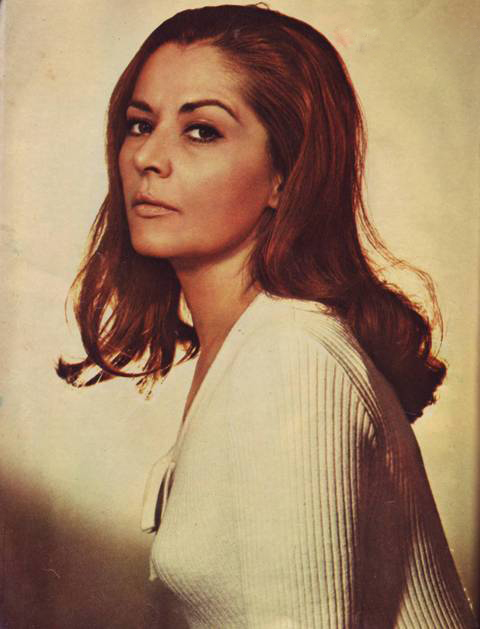
Margareta Pogonat

- 11 May – Margareta Pogonat, theater and film actress (b. 1933)
- 13 May – Mihail Grămescu, writer and member of the Writers' Union of Romania (b. 1951)
- 18 May – Radu Florescu, historian and professor at Boston College (b. 1925)

=== June ===
- 8 June – Veronica Lazăr, actress (b. 1938)
- 20 June – Florica Lavric, Olympic rower (b. 1962)
- 27 June – Nicolae Stroescu-Stînișoară, journalist, writer and director of the Romanian section of Radio Free Europe (b. 1925)

=== July ===
- 14 July – Vasile Zavoda, footballer (b. 1929)
- 20 July – Constantin Lucaci, sculptor and laureate of Herder Prize (b. 1923)

=== August ===
- 1 August – Szabolcs Cseh, stuntman and actor (b. 1942)
- 4 August – Ion Grosu, writer (b. 1939)
- 8 August – Aurel Cioranu, theater and film actor (b. 1929)
- 17 August – Dan Hăulică, literary essayist, art critic and corresponding member of the Romanian Academy (b. 1932)
- 19 August – Dinu Patriciu, politician and businessman (b. 1950)
- 20 August – Nicolae Balotă, essayist, critic, historian and literary theorist (b. 1925)
- 31 August – Ștefan Andrei, Communist politician and former Foreign Minister (b. 1931)

=== September ===
- 28 September – Nicolae Corneanu, Archbishop of Timișoara and Metropolitan of Banat (b. 1923)

=== October ===
- 12 October – Florin Tudose, psychiatrist (b. 1952)
- 16 October – Emilia Pavel, ethnographer and ethnologist (b. 1925)

=== November ===
- 4 November – Eftimie Luca, archbishop (b. 1914)
- 16 November – Serge Moscovici, social psychologist (b. 1925)

=== December ===
- 3 December – Corneliu Fânățeanu, tenor (b. 1933)
- 8 December – Cătălin Chelu, businessman (b. 1967)
- 10 December – Gavril Creța, engineer and professor (b. 1923)
- 11 December – Șerban Orescu, journalist (b. 1925)
- 15 December – Nicolae Manea, football player and coach (b. 1954)
- 23 December – Cornel Diaconu, film director (b. 1949)
- 27 December – Vlad Hogea, publicist and politician (b. 1977)

== See also ==
- 2014 in the European Union
- 2014 in Europe
- Romania in the Eurovision Song Contest 2014
- Romania at the 2014 Winter Olympics
- Romania at the 2014 Winter Paralympics
- Romania at the 2014 Summer Youth Olympics
