= 2006 in Romania =

- Decades: 1980s; 1990s; 2000s; 2010s; 2020s
- See also: Other events of 2006; History of Romania; Timeline of Romanian history; Years in Romania

Events from the year 2006 in Romania.

== Incumbents ==
- President: Traian Băsescu
- Prime Minister: Călin Popescu-Tăriceanu

== Events ==
=== April ===
- 14 April – President Traian Băsescu promulgates a law meant to reform the healthcare system.

=== June ===
- 25 June – Deftones concerts in Arenele Romane, Bucharest.

=== July ===
- 1 July – A Lacrimosa concert takes places at the Arenele Romane in Bucharest.

=== October ===
- 21 October – Romanian Television (Televiziunea Română, TVR) announces the 100 Greatest Romanians vote results.

== Births ==
- 23 May – Andreea Preda, artistic gymnast

== Deaths ==
=== January ===
- 27 January – Carol Lambrino, 86, Romanian Prince, elder son of King Carol II of Romania.

=== February ===
- 21 February – Angelica Rozeanu, 84, Romanian-born table tennis world champion, cirrhosis.

=== March ===
- 9 March – Laura Stoica, 38, Romanian pop rock singer, composer and actress.

=== June ===
- 1 June – Radu Bălescu, Romanian scientist (b. 1932)
- 18 June – Gică Petrescu, folk music composer and performer (b. 1915).

=== August ===
- 24 August – Cristian Nemescu, film director (b. 1979).
- 24 August – Andrei Toncu, sound designer (b. 1978).

=== September ===
- 14 September – Silviu Brucan, communist politician (b. 1916).

=== November ===
- 20 November – Zoia Ceaușescu, Romanian mathematician (b. 1949).

== See also ==
- 2006 in Europe
- Romania in the Eurovision Song Contest 2006
- Romania at the 2006 Winter Olympics
