= Tezaur folcloric =

- Genre: Reality television, music
- Presented by: Marioara Murărescu
- Country of origin: Romania
- Original language: Romanian

Original release
- Network: TVR 1 and TVR Moldova

Tezaur folcloric (English: Folk treasury) is a folk music TV show broadcast on TVR1 and TVR Moldova. TVR launched Tezaur folcloric in 1982. The show was presented until 2014 by Marioara Murărescu. Gheorghiţa Nicolae has presented the show since 2014. The theme music of the show is performed by Dumitru Fărcaș.
