= 1914 in Romania =

- Decades: 1890s; 1900s; 1910s; 1920s; 1930s
- See also: Other events of 1914; History of Romania; Timeline of Romanian history; Years in Romania

Events from the year 1914 in Romania.

== Incumbents ==
- King: Carol I.
- Prime Minister: Ion I. C. Brătianu.
