= 2000 in Romania =

- Decades: 1980s; 1990s; 2000s; 2010s; 2020s
- See also: Other events of 2000; History of Romania; Timeline of Romanian history; Years in Romania

Events from the year 2000 in Romania.

== Incumbents ==
- President: Emil Constantinescu, until 20 December; then Ion Iliescu
- Prime Minister: Mugur Isărescu until 28 October; then Adrian Năstase

== Events ==
=== January ===
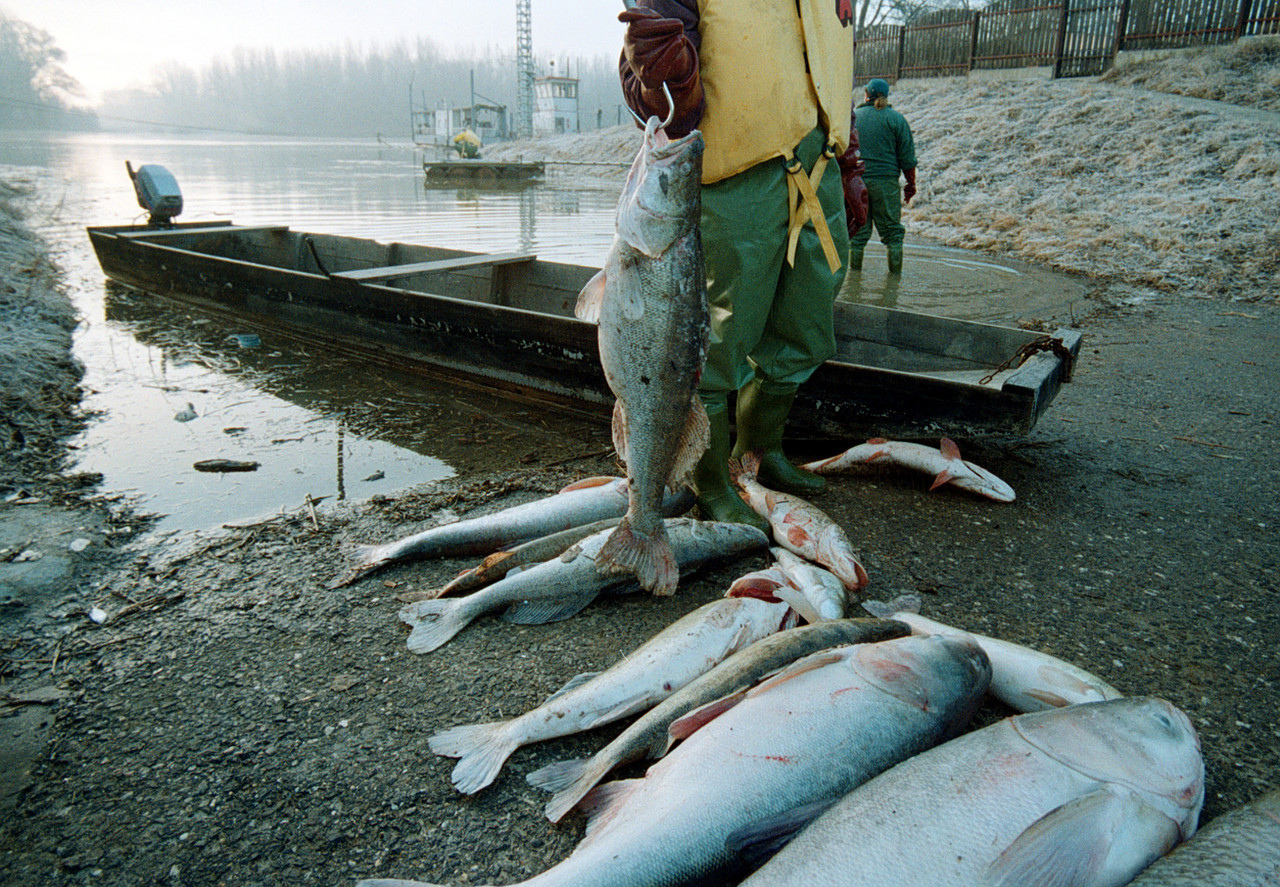

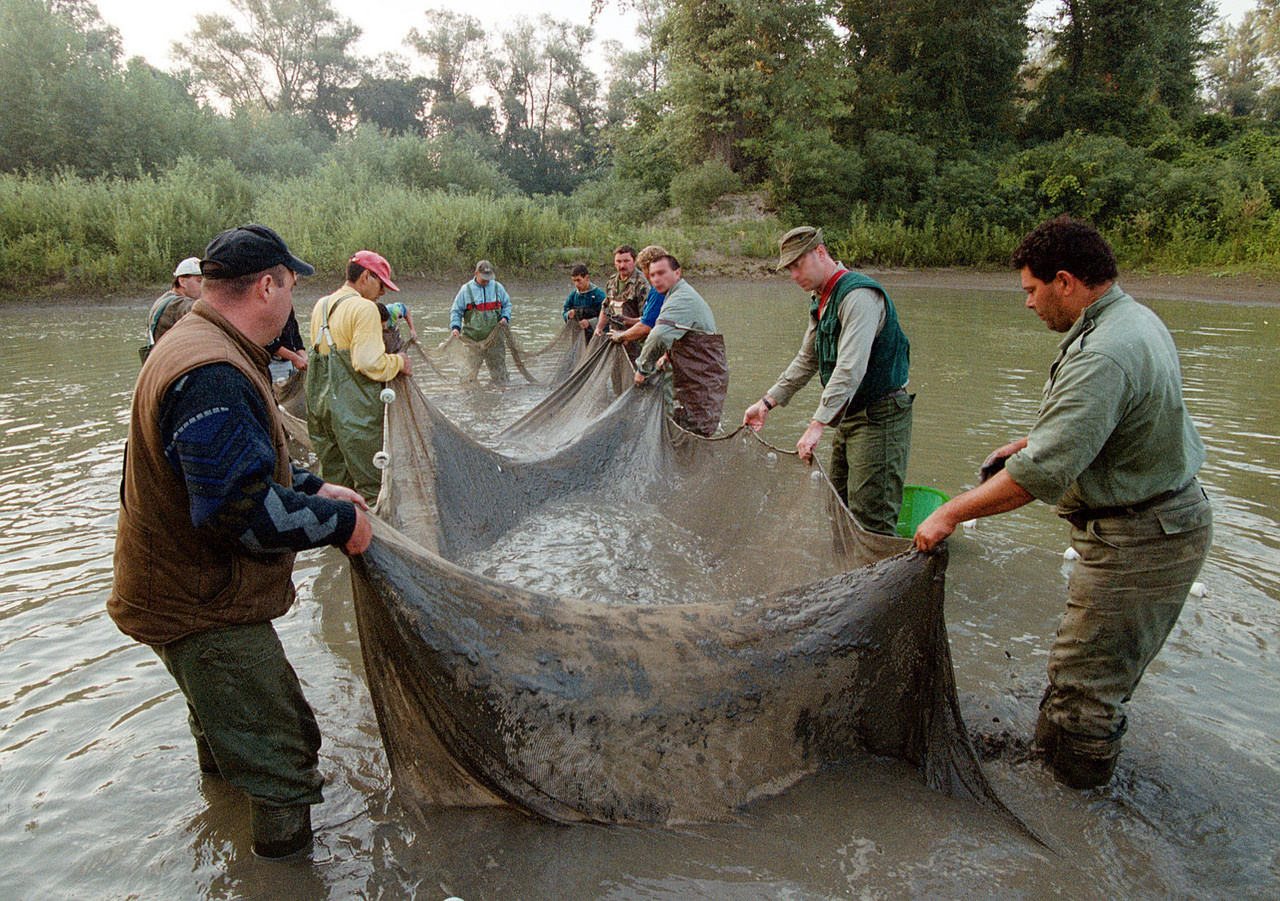

- 10 January – President Emil Constantinescu signs the Law of retrocession of agricultural and forest lands (Romanian: Legea de retrocedare a terenurilor agricole și forestiere), also known as the Lupu Law (Romanian: Legea Lupu).
- 30-31 January – 2000 Baia Mare cyanide spill: On the night of the 30th to the 31st of January, a dam of the Romanian-Australian "Aurul" venture is cracked on a portion of 25 metres, spilling 100,000 m^{3} of cyanide into the Lăpuș river, being subsequently spilled in the Someș, and then, the Tisza.

=== June ===
- 4 June – 2000 Romanian local elections:The first round of the local elections, with a tunrnout of 50.85%.
- 18 June – 2000 Romanian local elections:The second round of the local elections, with a turnout of 46.93%.

=== July ===
- 17 July – Emil Constantinescu announces he won't run for a second presidential term in the 2000 Romanian general election.
- 29 July – The Romanian Social Democratic Party absorbs the Socialist Party (Romanian: Partidul Socialist).

=== November ===
- 1 November – The privatisation contract of the Petromidia Refinery is approved between Fondul Proprietății de Stat and Rompetrol Group BV Rotterdam for the sum of 615 million USD.
- 26 November – 2000 Romanian general election: The parliament is elected and the first presidential election round takes place. Ion Iliescu (PDSR) and Corneliu-Vadim Tudor (PRM) qualify for the second round.

=== December ===
- 10 December – 2000 Romanian general election: Ion Iliescu is elected president in the second round of the presidential election.
- 17 December – The restoration of the Coloana Infinitului by Constantin Brâncuși, started on 16 September 1996, is finished.

== Births ==
=== January ===
- 5 January – Roxen, Romanian singer

=== February ===
- 2 February – Valentin Mihăilă, Romanian soccer player.

=== March ===
- 1 March – Ștefania Jipa, Romanian handball player.

=== September ===
- 16 September – Maria Holbură, retired Romanian gymnast.
- 19 September – Denisa Vâlcan, Romanian handball player.

=== October ===
- 12 October – Mihai Popa, Romanian goalkeeper.

== Deaths ==
=== February ===
- 8 February – Ion Gheorghe Maurer, 97, Prime Minister of Romania.

=== June ===
- 26 June – Corneliu Mănescu, 84, Romanian diplomat.

=== September ===
- 17 September – Dem Rădulescu, 68, Romanian actor.

=== October ===
- 5 October – Cătălin Hîldan, 24, Romanian football player.

== See also ==
- Romania in the Eurovision Song Contest 2000
- Romania at the 2000 Summer Olympics
- Romania at the 2000 Summer Paralympics
