= 1925 in Romania =

- Decades: 1900s; 1910s; 1920s; 1930s; 1940s
- See also: Other events of 1925; History of Romania; Timeline of Romanian history; Years in Romania

Events from the year 1925 in Romania. The year saw Miron Cristea elected the first Patriarch of All Romania and ended with the start of the Romanian dynastic crisis.

== Incumbents ==
- King: Ferdinand I
- Prime Minister: Ion I. C. Brătianu.

== Events ==
- 12 February – The Romanian Orthodox Church becomes a patriarchate, with Miron Cristea elected the Patriarch of All Romania.
- 14 June – The administration of Transylvania, Bukovina and Bessarabia is reformed into new counties. Some, like Alba remain into the next century; others, like Trei Scaune, only last until the reform of 1938.
- 26 June – The aircraft manufacturer Industria Aeronautică Română (IAR) is founded in Brașov.
- 25 November – The Fine Arts School of Cluj is founded, which goes on to become the Art and Design University of Cluj-Napoca.
- 12 December – Prince Carol, having eloped with Magda Lupescu, writes to King Ferdinand renouncing his right to the throne from Venice causing a dynastic crisis.
- 28 December – Prince Carol reiterates his desire to renounce the throne in favour of his son Michael from Milan.

== Births ==
- 1 March – Solomon Marcus, mathematician and member of the Romanian Academy (died 2016).
- 10 May – Ilie Verdeț, Prime Minister between 1979 and 1982 (died 2001).
- 16 June – Anatol E. Baconsky, poet and essayist (died 1977).
- 8 July – Eugen Țurcanu, criminal who was executed in 1954 at Jilava Prison for his role in the re-education experiment at Pitești Prison.
- 21 October – Virginia Zehan (stage name Virginia Zeani), operatic soprano (died 2023).

== Deaths ==
- 5 March – Gheorghe Munteanu-Murgoci, geologist (born 1872).
- 25 April – George Stephănescu, composer of operatic music (born 1843).
- 10 May – Alexandru Marghiloman, president of the Romanian Red Cross and Prime Minister in 1918 (born 1854).
- 17 June – Anghel Saligny, engineer and designer of the Anghel Saligny Bridge (born 1854).
