= 1999 in Romania =

- Decades: 1970s; 1980s; 1990s; 2000s; 2010s
- See also: Other events of 1999; History of Romania; Timeline of Romanian history; Years in Romania

This is a list of 1999 events that occurred in Romania.

== Incumbents ==
- President: Emil Constantinescu
- Prime Minister –
  - until 13 December: Radu Vasile
  - 13 December–22 December: Alexandru Athanasiu (acting)
  - starting 22 December: Mugur Isărescu

== Events ==
=== January ===
- 4 January – Start of the January 1999 Mineriad. Nearly 15,000 miners from National Coal Company in Jiu Valley start a strike to get higher salaries and renunciation to the program of closure of unprofitable mines, threatening to come to Bucharest if their demands are not met. The government refuses to negotiate.
- 15 January – January 1999 Mineriad: The Mineriad is declared illegal.
- 18 January – Over 10,000 miners begin a march to Bucharest.
- 20 January – January 1999 Mineriad: President convokes the Parliament in extraordinary session. The government is ready to negotiate, as long as the miners stop. They are ready to talk, but only with the Prime Minister. At around 18 o'clock, those 10,000 miners reach Horezu where they stay overnight.
- 21 January – January 1999 Mineriad: In Bucharest takes place a joint press conference of Group for Social Dialogue, Civic Alliance, Association of Former Political Prisoners in Romania, League for the Defence of Human Rights and Association of Victims of the Mineriads, during which is publicized the decision to organize a protest march against the miners manifestations, on 22 January. In Timișoara, over a thousand representatives of civil society organize a protest rally. At 15 o'clock, miners force the Costești barrage, which after an hour break it.
- 22 January – January 1999 Mineriad – "Peace of Cozia": Start negotiations between the commission headed by Prime Minister Radu Vasile and miners' leader Miron Cozma. At 18:30, negotiations end, Prime Minister saying: No part won, instead the country won.
- 23 January – January 1999 Mineriad – Miron Cozma and Romeo Beja, miners' leaders, convince the Prime Minister Radu Vasile to reopen Dâlja and Bărbăteni mines and to promise a salary increase for miners by 30–35%. Miners return in Jiu Valley.

=== February ===
- 17 February – February 1999 Mineriad: In Stoenești, Olt County, a new Mineriad occurs with violent clashes between police and groups of miners moving toward the capital. Unofficial sources indicate 15 deaths, the highest death toll during all six mineriads.

=== October ===
- 1 October – After a resounding corruption scandal that revealed the robbing of the bank, the government liquidates the bankrupt Bancorex.
- 21 October – Appears in Bucharest the first issue of Playboy magazine.
- 25 October – The first heart transplant in Romania is performed at the Floreasca Emergency Hospital by a team of doctors led by Prof. Dr. Șerban Brădișteanu.

=== Undated ===
- The Sever Zotta Romanian Institute of Genealogy and Heraldry is established.

== Births ==
- 20 March – Andreea Roșca, tennis player.

== Deaths ==
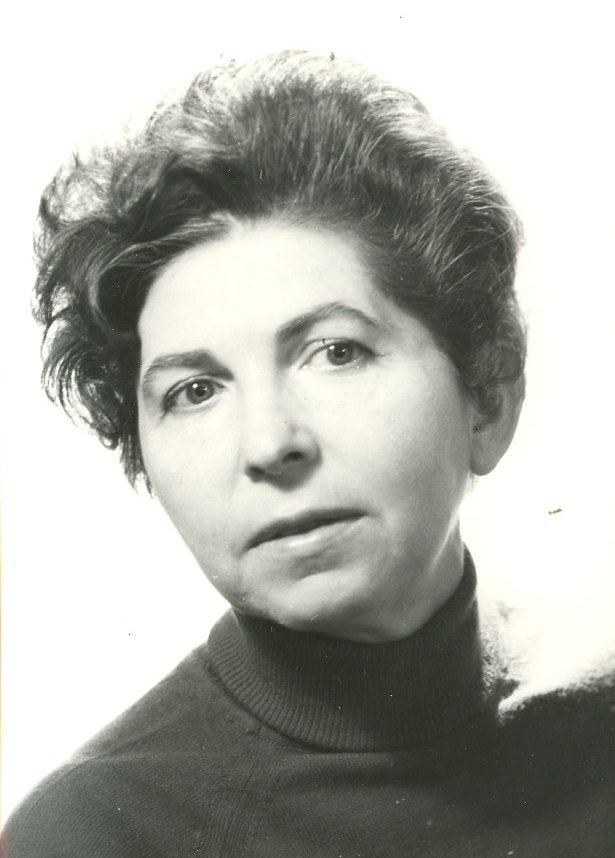
Maria Banuș

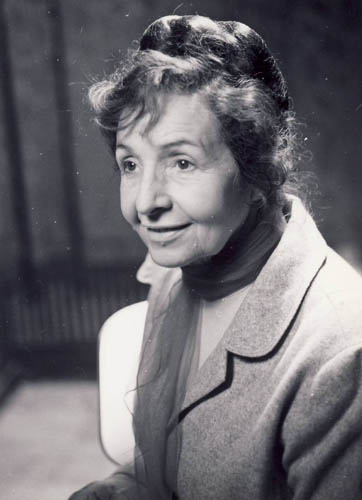
Silvia Dumitrescu-Timică

- 18 January – Marian Papahagi, literary critic, essayist and translator (b. 1948)
- 19 February – Constantin Oțet, football coach (b. 1940)
- 4 March – Vlad Mușatescu, writer and humorist (b. 1922)
- 17 March – Nicolae Dumitrescu, footballer and manager (b. 1921)
- 22 March – Valeriu Cristea, literary critic (b. 1937)
- 3 April – Traian Iordache, football player and coach (b. 1911)
- 20 June – Iulian Mihu, director (b. 1926)
- 5 July – Liviu Petrescu, critic, literary historian, and essayist (b. 1941)
- 12 July – Mircea Nedelciu, writer (b. 1950)
- 14 July
  - Cornel Regman, literary critic and historian (b. 1919)
  - Maria Banuș, poet, translator, and essayist (b. 1914)
- 16 July – Dan Sava, member of the humorous group Vacanța Mare (b. 1966)
- 1 August – Silvia Dumitrescu-Timică, theater and film actress (b. 1902)
- 6 August – Mihai C. Băcescu, zoologist, oceanologist, museologist and member of the Romanian Academy (b. 1908)
- 19 August – Mircea Sântimbreanu, writer of children's literature, publicist, screenwriter, and film producer (b. 1926)
- 5 November – Radu G. Țeposu, literary critic, essayist, and literary chronicler (b. 1954)
- 21 November – Ioan Chirilă, sports journalist and writer (b. 1925)
- 25 November – Alexandru Ciorănescu, one of the most important historians and geographers of the Canary Islands (b. 1911)
- 20 December – Valeriu Munteanu, linguist and translator (b. 1921)
