= Strointsi =

Strointsi (Ukrainian: Строїнці) may refer to the following places in Ukraine:

- Strointsi, Chernivtsi Oblast, village in Chernivtsi Raion, Chernivtsi Oblast
- Strointsi, Vinnytsia Oblast, village in Vinnytsia Raion, Vinnytsia Oblast
