= 2002 in Romania =

- Decades: 1980s; 1990s; 2000s; 2010s; 2020s
- See also: Other events of 2002; History of Romania; Timeline of Romanian history; Years in Romania

Events from the year 2002 in Romania.

== Incumbents ==
- President: Ion Iliescu
- Prime Minister: Adrian Năstase

== Events ==
=== March ===
- 15 March – Romanian film Filantropica is released.

=== November ===
- 23 November – United States President George W. Bush gives a speech in Revolution Square, Bucharest.

=== December ===
- 18 December – The government starts the procedure of repatriating the remains of Carol II.

=== Full date unknown ===
- Eurocopter Romania is established.
- The Peștera cu Oase ("Cave with Bones") located near the city of Anina, is uncovered containing 34,950-year-old human remains.
- Philippe Étienne is appointed French ambassador to Romania.

== Deaths ==
=== January ===
- 13 January - Ferdinand Weiss, 69, Romanian pianist.

=== February ===
- 20 February - Cristian Neamtu, Romanian player

=== April ===
- 12 April - Gabriel Raksi, 63, Romanian football player.

=== May ===
- 22 May - Alexandru Todea, 89, Romanian Greek-Catholic bishop and cardinal.

=== July ===
- 25 July - Alexander Ratiu, 86, Romanian-American priest of the Greek-Catholic Church.

=== September ===
- 2 September - Rodica Ojog-Brașoveanu, 63, Romanian writer, severe lung problems.

=== October ===
- 1 October - Ilie Ceaușescu, Romanian general and communist politician

== See also ==
- 2002 in Europe
- Romania in the Eurovision Song Contest 2002
- Romania at the 2002 Winter Olympics
