= 2003 in Romania =

- Decades: 1980s; 1990s; 2000s; 2010s; 2020s
- See also: Other events of 2003; History of Romania; Timeline of Romanian history; Years in Romania

Events from the year 2003 in Romania.

== Incumbents ==
- President: Ion Iliescu
- Prime Minister: Adrian Năstase

== Events ==
=== February ===
The labour code in Monitorul Oficial.

- 5 February – The new labour code is published in the Monitorul Oficial.
- 14 February – The remains of Carol II and of his wife, Magda Lupescu, are repatriated from Portugal and placed inside the Curtea de Argeș Cathedral.

=== March ===
- 1 March – The new labour code enters force.

=== May ===
- 24 May – The Democratic Party celebrates its 10 year anniversary in Constanța without its founder, Petre Roman.

=== October ===
- 18–19 October – The 2003 Romanian constitutional referendum takes place.

== Births ==
=== July ===
- 11 July – Costin Amzăr, footballer.
- 26 July – Luca Andronache, footballer.

== Deaths ==
=== May ===
- 15 May – Constantin Dăscălescu, Prime Minister of Romania (b. 1923)

=== September ===
- 9 September – Andrei Folbert, 72, Romanian basketball player.

=== October ===
- 4 October – Elisabeta Rizea, 91, Romanian anti-communist partisan, viral pneumonia.
- 12 October – Ion Ioanid, 77, Romanian dissident and writer.

=== November ===
- 22 November – Iosif Budahazi, 56, Romanian fencer (men's individual sabre, men's team sabre at the 1972 Summer Olympics).

== See also ==
- 2003 in Europe
- Romania in the Eurovision Song Contest 2003
