= Solange d'Herbez de la Tour =

French architect (born 1924)

- Born: 8 September 1924 (age 101); Bucharest, Romania
- Education: University of Bucharest; Polytechnical School of Bucharest.
- Occupation: Architect
- Awards: Ordre national du Mérite; Legion of Honour

Solange Pauline Eugénie d'Herbez de la Tour (born 8 September 1924) is a Romanian-born French architect.

== Life ==
She was born in 1924 to Albert and Juliette d'Herbez de la Tour in Bucharest, Romania. She received her Bachelor of Architecture degree from the University of Bucharest and then earned a degree in urban planning from the Polytechnical School of Bucharest. Herbez de la Tour moved to Paris, and opened her own architecture firm there. In Paris, she designed over 5,000 apartment units, public and cultural buildings, sports buildings, day nurseries, hospitals, elementary schools, and planning for new towns. She is the founder of the Union internationale des femmes architectes (English: International Union of Women Architects). She lives in Paris.

== Notable awards ==
- Chevalier, National Order of Merit, 1965
- Officer, Legion of Honour, 1981
- American Institute of Architects Honorary Fellowship, 1986
