= Greta Beer =

Romanian Jewish refugee immigrant to the U.S.

Greta Georgia Beer
- Born: June 25, 1921; Cernăuți, Romania
- Died: January 23, 2020 (aged 98); Brighton, Massachusetts

Greta Georgia Beer (née Deligdisch; 25 June 1921 – 23 January 2020) was a Romanian Jew who advocated the rights of thousands of other Holocaust survivors and their families, who collectively lost millions in assets during World War II. Her work culminated in a lawsuit against Swiss banks that resulted in a settlement of more than $1 billion. She spoke six languages fluently: Romanian, German, Polish, French, Italian, and English.

Beer was born and raised in Cernăuți, Romania (now Chernivtsi, Ukraine), and settled in the United States in the early 1950s, becoming a U.S. citizen in 1956.

== Life ==
Greta Beer (née Deligdisch) was born on June 25, 1921, in Cernăuti, Romania. Her father, Siegfried Deligdisch, owned a knitwear factory called Hercules SA that, at its peak, employed 1200 people.

In 1937 a fascist government came into power in Romania, and in 1940 it officially allied itself with the Axis powers of Nazi Germany, Italy and Japan.

The Beers family, which was Jewish, was persecuted under Romania's anti-Jewish laws.

Before the Beers fled the Nazis, Siegfried Deligdisch placed money in Swiss bank accounts. He had a person numbered account and a business account. He died in 1940. The Beer family, with Greta Beer, her mother, and her brother Otto, fled to the United States, where Greta became a citizen. In the 1970s her mother went from bank to bank in Switzerland trying to locate the bank accounts. Greta accompanied her, witnessing her treatment by the Swiss banks.

Realizing that her mother was not the only Jewish refugee whose assets were being kept by Swiss banks, Greta Beer shared her story with Wall Street Journal reporter Peter Gumbel, who wrote an exposé on how Swiss banks were hiding the accounts from their refugee owners. On April 23, 1996, Beer testified before Congress.
