= Cornel Trăilescu =

Romanian composer and conductor (1926–2019)

Cornel Trăilescu (11 August 1926, Timișoara – 8 January 2019) was a Romanian opera composer and conductor.

== Major works ==
- Puss in boots (Motanul Încălțat) (1961)
- Bălcescu (1974)
- Love and Sacrifice (Dragoste și jertfă) (1977)

== Sources ==
- Institutul de Memorie Culturală (Institute for Cultural Memory). Cornel Trăilescu. Accessed 11 January 2010 (in Romanian)
