= Corneliu Ciontu =

Romanian politician

Corneliu Ciontu (born 15 November 1941) is a Romanian politician, and currently general secretary of the Great Romania Party. In November 2005, he founded the People's Party, which was blocked in justice court. In August 2006 Ciontu became the vice-president of the New Generation Party, but after one year he withdrew from the party.

Before November 2005, Ciontu was the vice-president and later President of the Greater Romania Party, where he was seen as more moderate than the party's leader, Corneliu Vadim Tudor.
