= Marioara Murărescu =

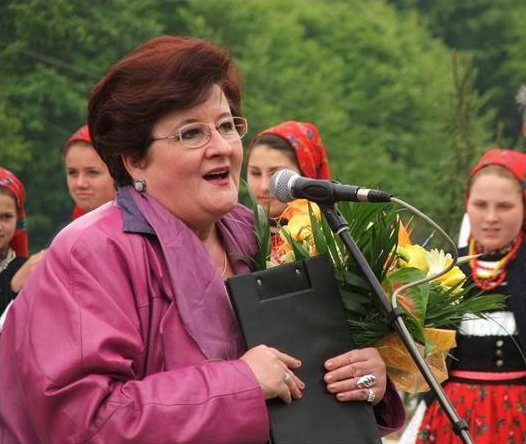
- Murărescu at the Sâmbra Oilor National Festival, Oaș Country, Transylvania (2006)
- Born: 1 October 1947; Bucharest, Romania
- Died: 30 January 2014 (aged 66); Bucharest, Romania
- Resting place: Cernica Monastery
- Education: Bucharest Conservatory
- Occupations: Television presenter and producer
- Employer: National Television (TVR)
- Children: Petre Murărescu
- Website: www.facebook.com/MarioaraMurarescuOfficial

Mărioara Murărescu (1 October 1947 – 30 January 2014), born as Maria Murărescu, was a well-known Romanian producer of folkloric television shows, being renowned for TVR's Tezaur folcloric (i.e. 'Folk treasure').
