= 1920 in Romania =

- Decades: 1900s; 1910s; 1920s; 1930s; 1940s
- See also: Other events of 1920; History of Romania; Timeline of Romanian history; Years in Romania

Events from the year 1920 in Romania. The year was marked by the signing of the Treaty of Trianon and Treaty of Paris, and a general strike.

== Incumbents ==
- King: Ferdinand I.
- Prime Minister:
  - Alexandru Vaida-Voevod (until 13 March).
  - Alexandru Averescu (from 13 March).

== Events ==
- 25 May – In a general election, the ruling People's Party is victorious.
- 4 June – The Treaty of Trianon is signed. Transylvania and most of Banat become part of Romania.
- 20 October – Over 400,000 workers engage in a general strike that lasts until 28 October.
- 28 October – The Treaty of Paris is signed, affirming the Union of Bessarabia with Romania.

== Births ==
- 25 April – Sofia Ionescu, neurosurgeon (died 2008).
- 3 July – Paul-Mihu Sadoveanu, novelist and soldier (killed in action at the Battle of Turda in 1944).
- 23 July – Adriana Georgescu-Cosmovici, political prisoner and memoirist (died in 2005).
- 16 August – Virgil Ierunca, literary critic, journalist, and poet (died 2006).
- 20 August – Zoe Dumitrescu-Bușulenga, comparatist and essayist (died 2006).
- 5 November – Kató Havas, violinist (died 2018).

== Deaths ==
- 27 February – Alexandru Dimitrie Xenopol, historian and philosopher (born 1847).
- 9 March – Haralamb Lecca, poet, playwright and translator (born 1873).
- 24 November – Alexandru Macedonski, poet, novelist, dramatist, and literary critic (born 1854).
