= 1998 in Romania =

- Decades: 1970s; 1980s; 1990s; 2000s; 2010s
- See also: Other events of 1998; History of Romania; Timeline of Romanian history; Years in Romania

Events from the year 1998 in Romania.

== Incumbents ==
- President of Romania: Emil Constantinescu
- Prime Minister of Romania:
  - until 30 March: Victor Ciorbea
  - 30 March–17 April: Gavril Dejeu (interim)
  - starting 17 April: Radu Vasile

== Events ==
=== January ===
- 18 January – Baia de Arieș is granted town status.

=== March ===
- 3 March – Mariana Cetiner, possibly the last person imprisoned in Romania for her sexual orientation, is released from prison by Presidential decree. She had been adopted by Amnesty International as a "prisoner of conscience" after being sentenced to three years' imprisonment solely because of her homosexuality.
- 30 March
  - Victor Ciorbea resigns from being prime minister. Gavril Dejeu replaces him as acting prime minister.
  - Radu Dinulescu, "the Eichmann of Romania", is rehabilitated by the Romanian Supreme Court.

=== April ===
- 2 April – President Emil Constantinescu appoints Radu Vasile to be the new prime minister.
- 15 April – The Parliament grants the investiture vote to the Radu Vasile Cabinet with 317 votes in favour and 124 against.
- 17 April – The Vasile Cabinet takes its oath of office.
- 23 April – The snacks maker Aprilia is founded in Târgu Jiu.

=== May ===
- In May 1998, UNESCO issued a technical report on the Endless Column, part of the Sculptural Ensemble of Constantin Brâncuși at Târgu Jiu, which is today a UNESCO World Heritage Site. This document is stated to have represented a milestone in the history of the Endless Column. On its provisions, the Romanian Government commissioned new tests on the Column's spine, which revealed that it was more suitable to preserve it than to replace it.

=== July ===
- 16 July – The Development regions of Romania are established by Law no. 151/1998.

=== October ===
- In October 1998, Romania imposed a 6% surcharge on all imports. Though this would be reduced to 4% starting from January 1999, then to 2% in January 2000, before being completely abolished by January 2001.
- 26 October – The Romanian Supreme Court rehabilitates a member of Ion Antonescu's World War II-era Axis government, Toma Ghițulescu.

=== December ===
- 30 December - Moldova begins a reorganization of its territory that closely follows the Romanian model, adopting Romania's Județ (county) as its primary administrative division.

=== Undated ===
- Euroinstal company is founded in Timișoara.

== Births ==
- 2 October – Robert Asăvoaei, footballer.

== Deaths ==
- 9 January – Lia Manoliu, discus thrower and Olympian (b. 1932).
- 1 July – Dumitru Berciu, historian and archaeologist (b. 1907).
- 31 July – Ioan Ploscaru, bishop of the Greek-Catholic Church (b. 1911).
- 1 October – Gabriel Sandu, football player (b. 1952).
- 8 October – Anatol Vieru, music theoretician, pedagogue, and composer (b. 1926).
- 14 October – Leopoldina Bălănuță actress (b. 1934).
- 23 October – Silviu Stănculescu, actor (b. 1932).
- 13 November – Ilie Văduva, communist politician, Minister of Foreign Affairs from 1985 to 1986 (b. 1934).
- 2 December – Cleopa Ilie abbot (b. 1912).

== International Sports ==
- 1998 FIG Artistic Gymnastics World Cup final: Romania wins 3 Gold (2 by Simona Amânar and 1 by Marius Urzică) and 2 Silver + 1 Bronze (all three by Gina Gogean).
- 1998 ICF Canoe Sprint World Championships: Romania wins 2 Silver (C-2 1000 m, C-4 500 m) and 1 Bronze (K-2 200 m).
- 15–16 May – 1998 Aerobic Gymnastics World Championships: Romania wins 1 Silver (Trio), and 2 bronze (Mixed Pair + Izabela Lăcătuș at Women's Individual).
- 10–30 June – 1998 FIFA World Cup: Romania tops Group G (notably besting England) and makes it to the Round of 16, where it loses to Croatia on 30 June. This remains Romania's last showing to the FIFA World Cup to date.
- 19 July-2 August – 1998 Goodwill Games: Romania wins 1 Gold, 3 Silver and 5 Bronze.
- 27–30 August – 1998 World Wrestling Championships (Greco-Roman): Romania wins 1 Silver (Marian Sandu at 54 kg)
- 9–18 September – 1998 World Rowing Championships: Romania wins 1 Gold (Women's W8+) and 3 Bronze (Men's M8+, Women's W2x and Women's LW2x).
- 27 September – 1998 IAAF World Half Marathon Championships: Romania wins 1 Silver (Women Team) and 1 Bronze (Lidia Șimon at Women's Individual).
- 6–11 October – 1998 World Fencing Championships: Romania wins 1 Silver (Women's Team Foil).

== Economic data for 1998 ==
- Romania's 1998 nominal GDP was the country's largest throughout the 1990s, and the only one in the decade to exceed $40 billion.
- 1998 was the first year in Romania's post-Communist history when the country's external debt decreased, down to $9.7 billion from $10.4 billion in 1997. The latter was greater than the Ceaușescu-era peak of $10.2 billion in 1981. The country's net external debt was lower still, given that Romania itself was owed $2.27 billion as of 30 June 1998. The top 5 debtor countries to Romania in 1998 were: Iraq ($1.73 billion), Sudan ($171 million), Syria ($150 million), Mozambique ($107 million) and Libya ($44 million). In 1998, Romania sold the $15 million debt owed to it by Zambia to a vulture fund, Donegal International Ltd, for $3.3 million. This came after repeated Zambian defaults.
- Debtor states to Romania in 1998

Country	Debt to Romania (in billions of USD)	1998 GDP (in billions of USD)	Debt to Romania (as percentage of 1998 GDP)
Iraq	1.73	4.6	37.6%
Syria	0.15	14.4	1.04%
Mozambique	0.1	3.87	2.58%

- 1998 was the last year in which the state had a majority share in any of Romania's main economic sectors: industrial output (54%), exports (51.1%), imports (51.7%) and investment (59.5%).
- In 1998, more than 98% of the tractors used in Romania were Romanian-made. UTB Braşov produced 9,436 tractors in 1998, though the vast majority of these were for export.
- In 1998, the state accounted for 61.3% of Romania's fresh meat output. This was the only branch of the food processing sector still dominated by the state in 1998.
- Romanian automotive production in 1998 by brand:

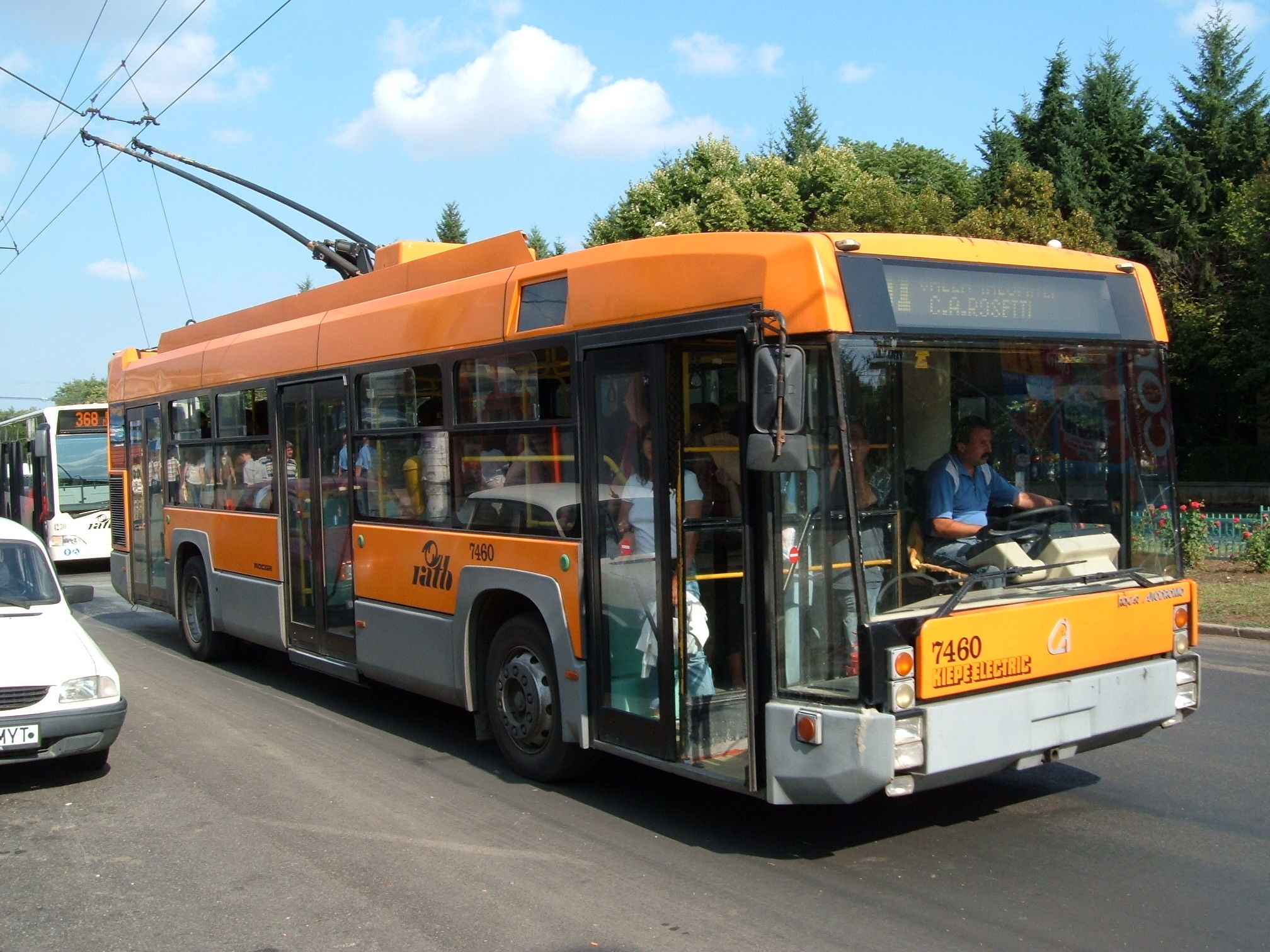
Rocar 812E (Autodromo), a unique prototype low-floor trolleybus built in Romania during 1998

Brand	Cars produced	Commercial vehicles (CVs) produced
ARO	1,342	1,064
Dacia	85,862	20,139
Daewoo (Rodae)	16,727	289
Rocar	-	405
Roman	-	1,076
Total	103,931	22,973

- Structure of the Romanian mineral industry in 1998
  - Aluminum: total yearly capacity - 920 thousand metric tons (Oradea - 250, Tulcea - 400, Slatina - 270)
  - Barite: Roșia Montană Mine - yearly capacity: 100 thousand metric tons
  - Bauxite: Oradea mining complex - yearly capacity: 350 thousand metric tons
  - Cement:
    - Cimentul SA Turda in Turda - yearly capacity: 1.36 million metric tons of cement and 850 thousand metric tons of clinker
    - Cimentul SA Cimus in Câmpulung - yearly capacity: 2.2 million metric tons of cement and 1.36 million metric tons of clinker
    - Moldocim SA Bicaz in Bicaz - yearly capacity: 3.1 million metric tons of cement and 1.52 million metric tons of clinker
    - Romcim SA Fieni in Fieni - yearly capacity: 1.6 million metric tons of cement and 960 thousand metric tons of clinker
    - Romcim SA Aleșd in Aleșd - yearly capacity: 3.5 million metric tons of cement and 2.12 million metric tons of clinker
    - Romcim SA Hoghiz in Hoghiz - yearly capacity: 2.2 million metric tons of cement and 1.52 million metric tons of clinker
    - Romcim SA Medgidia in Medgidia - yearly capacity: 3.5 million metric tons of cement and 1.98 million metric tons of clinker
    - Romcim SA Bârsești in Târgu Jiu - yearly capacity: 3.0 million metric tons of cement and 2.045 million metric tons of clinker
  - Coal:
    - Valea Jiului Mining Complex in Hunedoara County - yearly capacity: 10.4 million metric tons (bituminous)
    - Oltenia Mining Complex (including the mining enterprise at Rovinari) - yearly capacity: 20.3 million metric tons (lignite)
    - Ploiești Mining Complex in Ploiești - yearly capacity: 8.7 million metric tons (lignite)
  - Copper:
    - Ore (concentrate) at the Baia Mare, Baia Sprie, Cavnic, Roșia Montană, Borșa, Bălan, Roșia Poieni and Moldova Nouă mines - yearly capacity: 180 thousand metric tons
    - Refined into metal at Baia Mare using an Outokumpu copper smelter - yearly capacity: 35 thousand metric tons; and at the Zlatna smelter and refinery - yearly capacity: 13 thousand metric tons
  - Ferroalloys: Ferom-Joint Stock Co. at Tulcea - yearly capacity: 280 thousand metric tons
  - Iron ore: Hunedoara mining complex (yearly capacity: 1.32 million metric tons), Reșița mining complex (yearly capacity: 660 thousand metric tons) and Cluj-Napoca mining complex (yearly capacity: 990 thousand metric tons)
  - Lead:
    - Ore - Baia Mare mine (yearly capacity: 24 thousand metric tons) and Bălan mine (yearly capacity: 10 thousand metric tons)
    - Metal - Copșa Mică smelter - yearly capacity: 42 thousand metric tons
  - Natural gas: Târgu Mureș Field (yearly capacity: 996 billion cubic feet) and Ploiești Field (yearly capacity: 249 billion cubic feet)
  - Petroleum:
    - Crude - Ploiești, Pitești, Târgoviște, Bacău and Târgu Jiu fields - yearly capacity: 250 million metric tons
    - Refined - Refineries at Brazi, Pitești, Onești, Braşov, Câmpina, Dărmănești, Oradea, Ploiești and Năvodari - yearly capacity: 664 million metric tons
  - Steel: total yearly capacity: 17.335 million metric tons (Oțelu Roșu - 0.4, Câmpia Turzii - 0.3, Galați - 10, Călan - 2.135, Reșița - 1.2, Călărași - 2.2 and Târgoviște - 1.1 )
  - Zinc:
    - Ore - Baia Mare mine - yearly capacity: 60 thousand metric tons
    - Metal - Copșa Mică smelter - yearly capacity: 66 thousand metric tons

- Among the 9 ex-Warsaw Pact countries that became members of the EU and NATO, Romania ranked as follows in 1998:
  - Lowest penetration of foreign capital in the economy as percentage of GDP - 10.4%
  - Lowest private sector share of GDP - 60%. This was as low for that year as Vietnam, an official Communist state in 1998.
  - Lowest external debt as percentage of GDP - 24.0%
  - Highest asset share of state-owned banks - 74.6%
  - The only country out of the 9 where non-performing loans accounted for a majority of bank portfolios - 59%
  - The only country out of the 9 that maintained an independent float of its national currency, not linking its exchange rate to any foreign currency
  - Lowest trade openness.
  - Highest Nations in Transit score. Freedom House's Nations in Transit score comprises 8 categories: political process, civil society, independent media, governance and public administration, rule of law, privatization, macroeconomics and microeconomics. Each category is assigned a score from 1 (highest) to 7 (lowest). Thus, the highest the total score (8 to 56), the more authoritarian the country. In 1998, with a score of 33, Romania was even more authoritarian than Russia (32).
  - Second greatest decline in real gross industrial output relative to 1989 (-57.5%), only Lithuania faring worse in this regard (-59.4%).
  - Third smallest GPD (PPP) per capita ($5,646 / €5,576), only above Latvia ($5,557 / €5,465) and Bulgaria ($4,776 / €4,583). Nevertheless, due to having the second highest population (22.503 million in 1998), Romania still managed to also have the second highest total GDP (PPP) - €125 billion, just barely above the Czech Republic (€124 billion), which had less than half of Romania's population but well over twice its GDP (PPP) per capita. Poland was the undisputed first in terms of both population and total GDP (PPP).
  - Third largest decline in real wages relative to 1989 (-38.9%), only Bulgaria (-53%) and Lithuania (-55.4%) faring worse in this regard. Romania in 1998 registered its lowest real wage during the 1990s.
  - Fourth largest decline in real GDP relative to 1989 (-21.9%), after Bulgaria (-32.7%), Lithuania (-34.4%) and Latvia (-40.6%). (Note: the average between the EIU estimate (used by the OECD) and the UNECE estimate (used by the Council of Europe))
  - Industrial products rankings
    - By far the largest natural gas production (14.6 billion cubic meters), more than double the combined output of the other 8 countries.
    - By far the largest crude oil production (48 million 42-gallon barrels), more than double the combined output of the other 8 countries.
    - Largest gold production (4 metric tons).
    - Second largest silver production (60 metric tons), after Poland (1,000 metric tons).
    - Second largest steel production (6.5 million metric tons, tied with the Czech Republic), after Poland (11.5 million metric tons).
    - Second largest cement production (7 million metric tons), after Poland (14.97 million metric tons).
    - Second largest salt production (2.55 million metric tons), after Poland (3.9 million metric tons).
    - Second largest uranium production (118 metric tons), after the Czech Republic (719 metric tons).
    - Fourth largest coal production (25.928 million metric tons), after Bulgaria, the Czech Republic and Poland.

== See also ==
- Romania in the Eurovision Song Contest 1998
- Romania at the 1998 Winter Olympics
