= 1923 in Romania =

- Decades: 1900s; 1910s; 1920s; 1930s; 1940s
- See also: Other events of 1923; History of Romania; Timeline of Romanian history; Years in Romania

Events from the year 1923 in Romania. The year saw the country adopt a new constitution.

== Incumbents ==
- King: Ferdinand I.
- Prime Minister: Ion I. C. Brătianu.

== Events ==
- 4 March – The far-right National-Christian Defense League (Liga Apărării Național Creștine, LANC) is founded.
- 29 March – The Constitution of Union is introduced, providing a representative democracy based on universal manhood suffrage.
- 17 May – The Unknown Soldier is buried in Bucharest.
- 23 June – The Societatea Națională de Credit Industrial is founded by the National Bank of Romania to provide credit and financial services to the industry.
- 18 December – The King Ferdinand I National Military Museum (Muzeul Militar Național "Regele Ferdinand I") is founded.
- 19 December – Elisabeth of Romania, Queen Consort, and King George II of Greece, find refuge in Romania after having to leave Greece.

== Births ==
- 26 January – Gertrud Szabolcsi, biochemist and first lady of Hungary (died 1993).
- 23 February – Margarita Caranica, pen name Eta Boeriu, poet and critic (died 1984).
- 2 April – Yolanda Marculescu, coloratura soprano (died 1992).
- 8 October – Ion Voicu, violinist and orchestral conductor (died 1997).
- 14 October – Cassius Ionescu-Tulcea, mathematician (died 2021).
- 19 November – Monica Lovinescu, essayist and short story writer (died 2008).
- 25 November – Paul Niculescu-Mizil, communist politician (died 2008).

== Deaths ==
- 17 July – Theodor Rosetti, prime minister 1888 to 1889 (born 1837).
- 6 September – Sofronie Vulpescu, bishop (born 1856).
