= People's Party (Romania, 2005–06) =

People's Party Partidul Popular
- Last leader: Corneliu Ciontu
- Founded: November 2005
- Dissolved: August 2006
- Split from: Greater Romania Party
- Merged into: New Generation Party
- Ideology: Christian democracy
- European affiliation: none
- International affiliation: none
- Colours: Green and Dark Grey

Website
- www.pp.ro

The People's Party (Romanian: Partidul Popular) was a centre-right Christian-Democratic party in Romania, formed in November 2005 by Corneliu Ciontu, previously the president and vice-president of the Greater Romania Party.

In August 2006 it was absorbed into the New Generation Party.

== Policies ==
The People's Party was formed by a number of politicians splitting from the Greater Romania Party in order to distance themselves from the more nationalist and xenophobic views of that party and its leader, Corneliu Vadim Tudor. The People's Party states it believes in Christian democratic politics, and has expressed its desire to join the European People's Party upon Romania's accession to the EU in 2007.

The party states it believes in liberal democracy, as well as a more free-market-oriented economy with less government intervention. Socially, it promotes Christian values as well as Romanian cultural values. According to its website, it seeks to represent "the common-sensed regardless of age, sex, ethnicity or religion."
