= Bolgrad palace bombing =

1921 palace bombing in Romania

- Location: Bolgrad, Kingdom of Romania (now Bolhrad, Ukraine)
- Date: 13 December 1921 (UTC+02:00)
- Attack type: Bombing, mass murder
- Deaths: 100-300 (exact number unknown)

The Bolgrad palace bombing occurred on 13 December 1921 when a bomb was thrown into the Siguranța palace located in Bolgrad, Kingdom of Romania, resulting in the deaths of 100-300 soldiers and police officers. The attackers were suspected to have been Bessarabia-based anarchists and possibly affiliated with Bessarabian separatism.
