= 2015 in Romania =

- Decades: 1990s; 2000s; 2010s; 2020s
- See also: Other events of 2015; History of Romania; Timeline of Romanian history; Years in Romania

The following lists events that happened during 2015 in Romania.

== Incumbents ==
- President: Klaus Iohannis
- Prime Minister: Victor Ponta (until November); Dacian Cioloș (since November)

== Events ==
=== January ===
- 1 January – Five people are found dead in a sheepfold in Stănilești, Vaslui County, intoxicated with the fumes from a faulty stove.
- 10 January – Three people die and 14 others are hospitalized, including seven in coma, after drinking smuggled alcohol in Dragalina, Călărași County.
- 12 January – Six children and their father die intoxicated with carbon monoxide in a studio apartment from Rovinari.
- 27 January – George Maior resigns from the leadership of the Romanian Intelligence Service after months of institutional tensions between SRI and civil authorities. General Florian Coldea takes over as interim.
- 29 January
  - A woman and her six children are found dead in their home in Racovița, Vâlcea County, most likely intoxicated during sleep with carbon monoxide.
  - Elena Udrea suspends herself from the leadership of the People's Movement Party due to criminal investigation in the Microsoft licensing corruption scandal. Eugen Tomac becomes the interim president of the party.

=== February ===
- 6 February – The oldest stable human settlement in Europe (9,000 years ago) is discovered in Schela Cladovei, a neighborhood of Drobeta-Turnu Severin.
- 24 February – The Electoral Code Commission decides the return to vote on the list and the renunciation to uninominal voting system used in the 2008 and 2012 legislative elections.

=== March ===
- 15 March – Minister of Finance, Darius Vâlcov, resigns as the National Anticorruption Directorate prompts his criminal investigation for influence peddling in his capacity as mayor of Slatina. His resignation was demanded by President Klaus Iohannis and members of the National Liberal Party.

=== April ===
- 10 April – A fire kills six people in Satu Mare, including three children.

=== June ===
- 20 June – Romania becomes full member of the European Organization for Nuclear Research.

=== July ===
- Romania experiences the most severe drought in 50 years. Over 900,000 hectares of crops are compromised across the country.
- 24 July – Alexandru Vișinescu, a former Communist-era prison commander, is sentenced to 20 years in jail after being convicted of crimes against humanity in the first such trial in Romania.

=== August ===
- 3 August – Romania charges units of Russian oil producer OAO Lukoil with complicity in money laundering in a case estimated at 1.77 billion euros.
- 9 August – Two people are killed and 48 injured, including 21 children, after a coach with Ukrainian tourists overturns on the Sun Motorway.
- 19 August – A coach carrying tourists overturns on the Brăila–Galați road, killing three people and injuring 28.
- 27 August – One person dies and another 14 are injured, after a minibus carrying 19 passengers collides with a car in Bobicești, Olt County.

=== September ===
- 6 September – The mayor of Bucharest, Sorin Oprescu, is arrested at home in an investigation into allegations of taking bribes.

=== October ===
- 21 October – Former President Ion Iliescu is accused of crimes against humanity in June 1990 Mineriad case.
- 30 October – A fire at a nightclub in downtown Bucharest kills 60 people and injures 151 more.

=== November ===
- 4 November – Prime Minister Victor Ponta resigns under the pressure of countrywide anti-corruption protests. The mayor of Sector 4 of Bucharest, Cristian Popescu Piedone, also submits his mandate. On the same day, Iohannis meets with the President of Poland Andrzej Duda and creates Bucharest Nine.
- 10 November – Former European Commissioner for Agriculture Dacian Cioloș is nominated by President Klaus Iohannis to form a new government.
- 17 November – The Cioloș Cabinet is validated by the Parliament.

=== December ===
- 22 December – French retailer Carrefour signs an agreement with REWE Group for the acquisition of Billa Romania, with a network of 86 supermarkets nationwide. The transaction is estimated at 96–97 million euros.

== Sports ==
- 20 December – Romania wins the bronze medal in the 22nd IHF World Women's Handball Championship. Cristina Neagu is named the best player of the competition.

== Arts and entertainment ==
- 24 January – Ion Dacian Operetta and Musical Theatre is inaugurated in Bucharest. This is the first theatre opened in Romania after the revolution of 1989.
- 14 February – Radu Jude wins the Silver Bear for Best Director with Aferim! at the 65th Berlin International Film Festival.
- 29 July–2 August – Untold Festival takes place in Cluj-Napoca, attracting over 240,000 participants. 170 international and national artists perform during the four days of festival, including Avicii, Armin van Buuren, David Guetta, ATB, Fedde le Grand and Tinie Tempah.
- 3 December – Feciorescul de Ticuș, a genre of men's folk dance, is inscribed on the Representative List of the Intangible Cultural Heritage of Humanity.

== Deaths ==
=== January ===
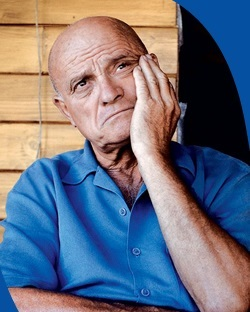
Justin Capră

Alexander Vraciu

- 13 January – Valentin Nicolau, geophysicist, writer and President of the Romanian Television (2002–05) (b. 1960)
- 18 January – Christine Valmy, esthetician, consultant and entrepreneur (b. 1926)
- 19 January – Justin Capră, inventor, professor and engineer (b. 1933)
- 27 January – Viorica Lascu, philologist and historian (b. 1919)
- 29 January – Alexander Vraciu, United States Navy fighter ace (b. 1918)
- 30 January – Aureliu Leca, writer, professor and PSD senator (2000–04) (b. 1940)

=== February ===
- 3 February – Ion Nunweiller, football player and manager (b. 1936)
- 14 February – Octavian Naghiu, tenor (b. 1933)
- 16 February – Radu Simion, pan flute musician and orchestra leader (b. 1940)
- 21 February – Camil Mureșanu, historian and member of the Romanian Academy (b. 1927)

=== March ===
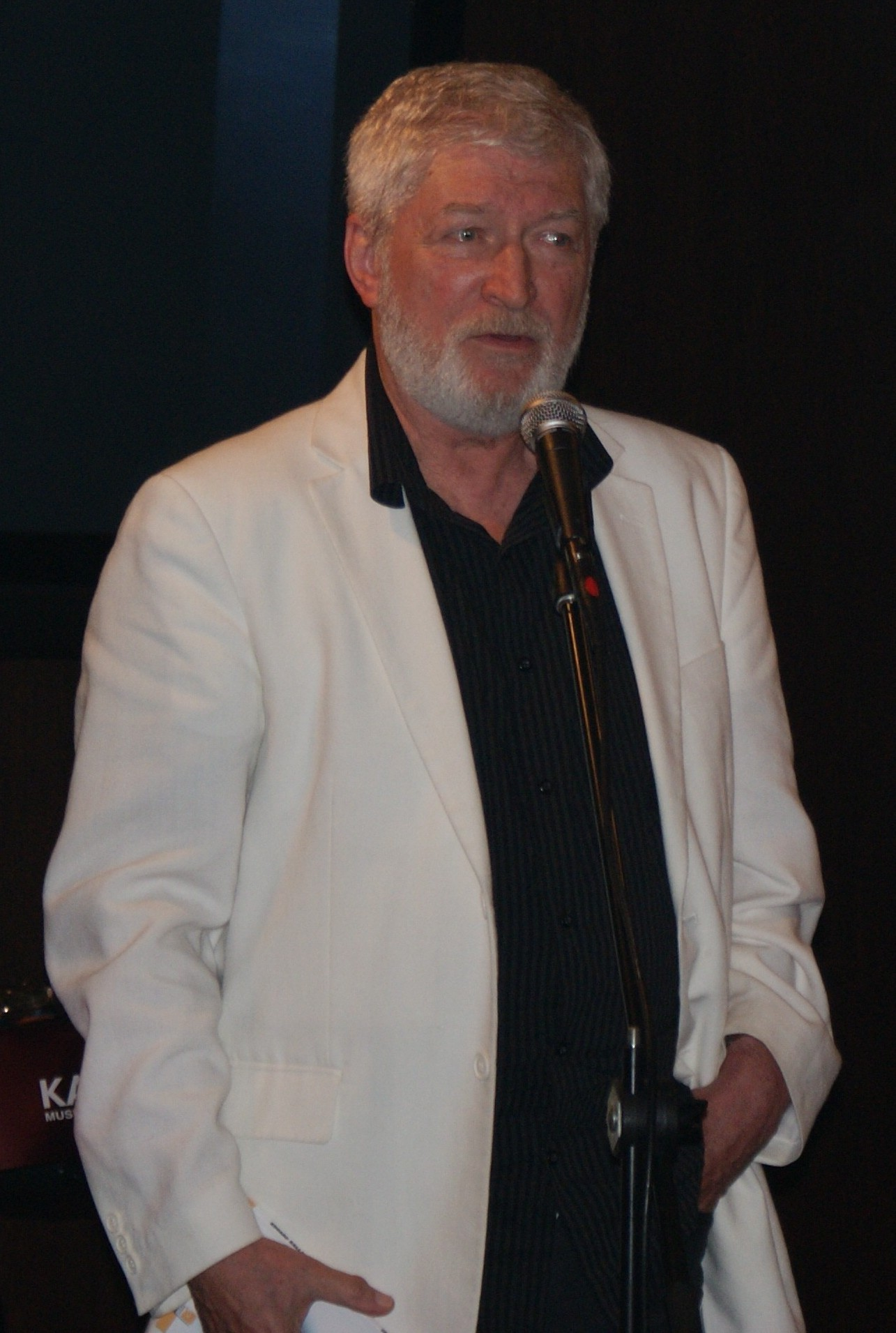
Eusebiu Ștefănescu

- 4 March – George Motoi, actor and theater director (b. 1936)
- 9 March – Marcel Dragomir, composer (b. 1944)
- 13 March – Maria Vicol, Olympic fencer (b. 1935)
- 15 March – Eusebiu Ștefănescu, actor (b. 1944)
- 20 March – Andrei Brezianu, essayist, writer and translator (b. 1934)

=== April ===
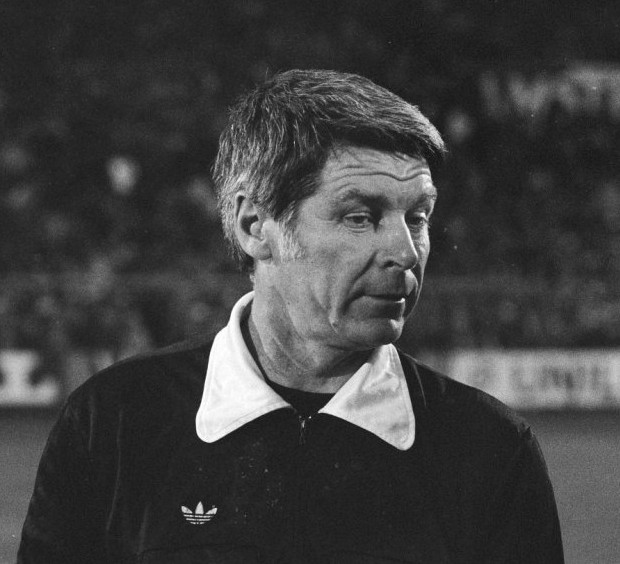
Nicolae Rainea

- 1 April – Nicolae Rainea, football referee (b. 1933)
- 3 April –
  - Petre Anghel, writer and professor (b. 1944)
  - Paul Grigoriu, journalist and writer (b. 1945)
- 4 April – Ioan Pușcaș, radiologist (b. 1932)
- 9 April – Constantin Drăghici, singer, composer and orchestrator (b. 1932)
- 11 April – Toma Dordea, electrical engineer (b. 1921)
- 14 April – Meir Rosenne, jurist and diplomat (b. 1931)

=== June ===
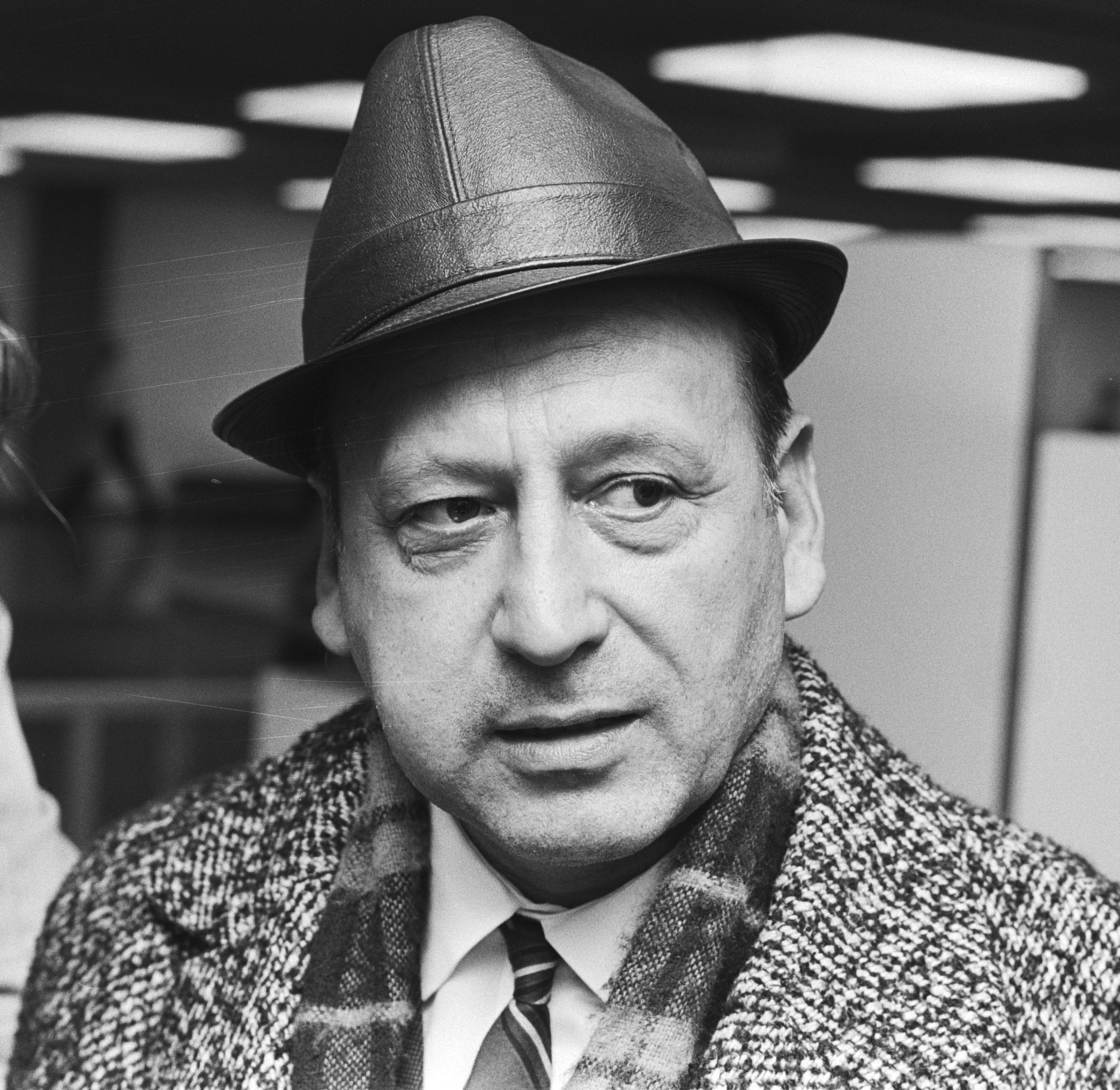
Angelo Niculescu

- 20 June – Angelo Niculescu, footballer and coach (b. 1921)
- 21 June – Bogdan Nicula, ballet dancer (b. 1979)
- 22 June – Constantin Cernăianu, football player and coach (b. 1933)
- 30 June – Ludovic Bács, musician, conductor, composer and violinist (b. 1930)

=== July ===
- 7 July – Angela Ciochină, singer, songwriter and singing teacher (b. 1955)
- 25 July – Valeriu Pantazi, poet, writer and painter (b. 1940)

=== August ===
- 3 August – Laurențiu Mircea Popescu, physician, professor and politician (b. 1944)
- 6 August
  - Malvina Urșianu, screenwriter and film director (b. 1927)
  - Mircea Dobrescu, boxer (b. 1930)
- 20 August – Alexandru Nicula, papal prelate (b. 1913)
- 27 August – Matei Boilă, senator, political prisoner and Greek Catholic priest (b. 1926)
- 30 August – Dan Iordăchescu, baritone (b. 1930)

=== September ===
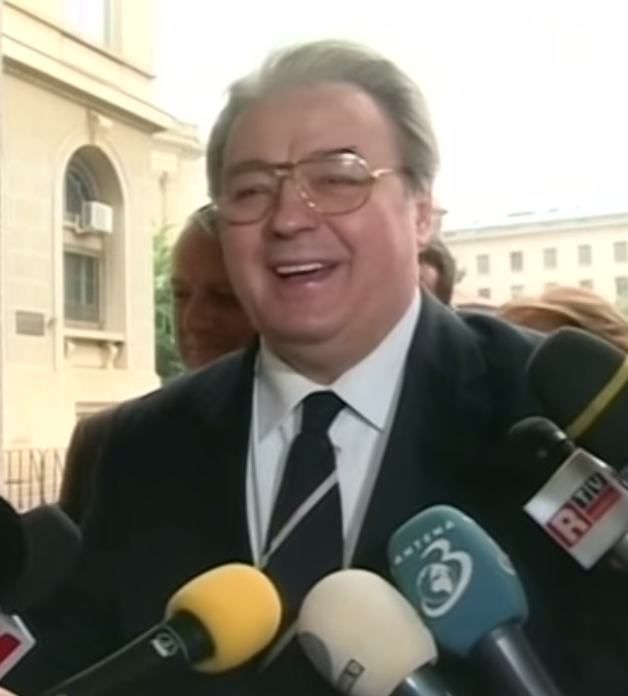
Corneliu Vadim Tudor

- 9 September – Florin Ganea, footballer (b. 1976)
- 14 September – Corneliu Vadim Tudor, writer, politician and journalist (b. 1949)
- 29 September
  - Sorin Avram, football player and coach (b. 1943)
  - Imre Fodor, politician (b. 1937)
- 30 September – Lucreția Ciobanu, singer of popular music (b. 1924)

=== October ===
- 6 October – Paula Iacob, lawyer (b. 1932)
- 14 October – Florența Mihai, tennis player (b. 1955)
- 16 October – Liviu Radu, writer, publicist and translator (b. 1948)
- 27 October – Mitzura Arghezi, actress and politician, daughter of Tudor Arghezi (b. 1924)
- 30 October
  - Vlad Țelea, guitarist of Goodbye to Gravity (b. 1978)
  - Mihai Alexandru, guitarist of Goodbye to Gravity (b. 1981)

=== November ===
- 12 November – Lucian Bălan, footballer (b. 1959)
- 28 November – Mircea Anca, actor and film director (b. 1960)

=== December ===
- 9 December – Gheorghe Gruia, handball player (b. 1940)
- 11 December – Mihai Adam, footballer (b. 1940)
- 13 December – Florin Manolescu, critic, literary historian and writer (b. 1943)

== See also ==
- List of 2015 box office number-one films in Romania
- 2015 in the European Union
- 2015 in Europe
- Romania in the Eurovision Song Contest 2015
