= 1922 in Romania =

- Decades: 1900s; 1910s; 1920s; 1930s; 1940s
- See also: Other events of 1922; History of Romania; Timeline of Romanian history; Years in Romania

Events from the year 1922 in Romania. The year saw the Dealul Spirii Trial and the crowning of King Ferdinand.

== Incumbents ==
- King: Ferdinand I.
- Prime Minister:
  - Take Ionescu (until 19 January).
  - Ion I. C. Brătianu (from 19 January).

== Events ==
- 23 January – The Dealul Spirii Trial of members of the Communist Party commences.
- 1 March – A general election is held for the Chamber of Deputies and Senate, running until 11 March. The governing National Liberal Party retains power.
- 11 April – In a hearing, the prime minister publicly commends the work of the Communist Party.
- 13 April – The king signs the Bessarabian Treaty, confirming the Union of Bessarabia with Romania.
- 4 June – The government issues an amnesty decree for the release of the Dealul Spirii convicts, which is signed by the king two days later.
- 15 October – Ferdinand is crowned King of Romania at Coronation Cathedral, Alba Iulia.
- 18 December – The Magyar Party is founded.

== Births ==
- 28 February – Radu Câmpeanu, politician, jurist, and economist (died 2016).
- 23 April – Pavel Chihaia, novelist (died 2019).
- 26 April – Ștefan Augustin Doinaș, poet, political prisoner and politician (died 2005).
- 29 May – Iannis Xenakis, architect and avant-garde composer (died 2001).
- 7 June – Egon Balas, mathematician (died 2019).
- 17 October – Tudor Ganea, mathematician (died 1971).
- 30 October – Iancu Țucărman, agricultural engineer (died 2021).

== Deaths ==
- 22 January – Alexandru Ciurcu, inventor of a form of rocket engine (born 1854).
- 12 May – Alexandru Bogdan-Pitești, Symbolist poet, essayist, and art and literary critic (born 1870).
- 3 June – Duiliu Zamfirescu, novelist, poet, and short story writer, member of the Romanian Academy (born 1858).
- 29 November – Vasile Lucaciu, Greek Catholic priest and an advocate of equal rights (born 1852).
