= 2012 in Romania =

- Decades: 1990s; 2000s; 2010s; 2020s
- See also: Other events of 2012; History of Romania; Timeline of Romanian history; Years in Romania

Events from the year 2012 in Romania.

== Incumbents ==
- President: Traian Băsescu
- Prime Minister: Emil Boc (until February); Mihai Răzvan Ungureanu (until April); Victor Ponta (since April)

== Events ==
=== January ===
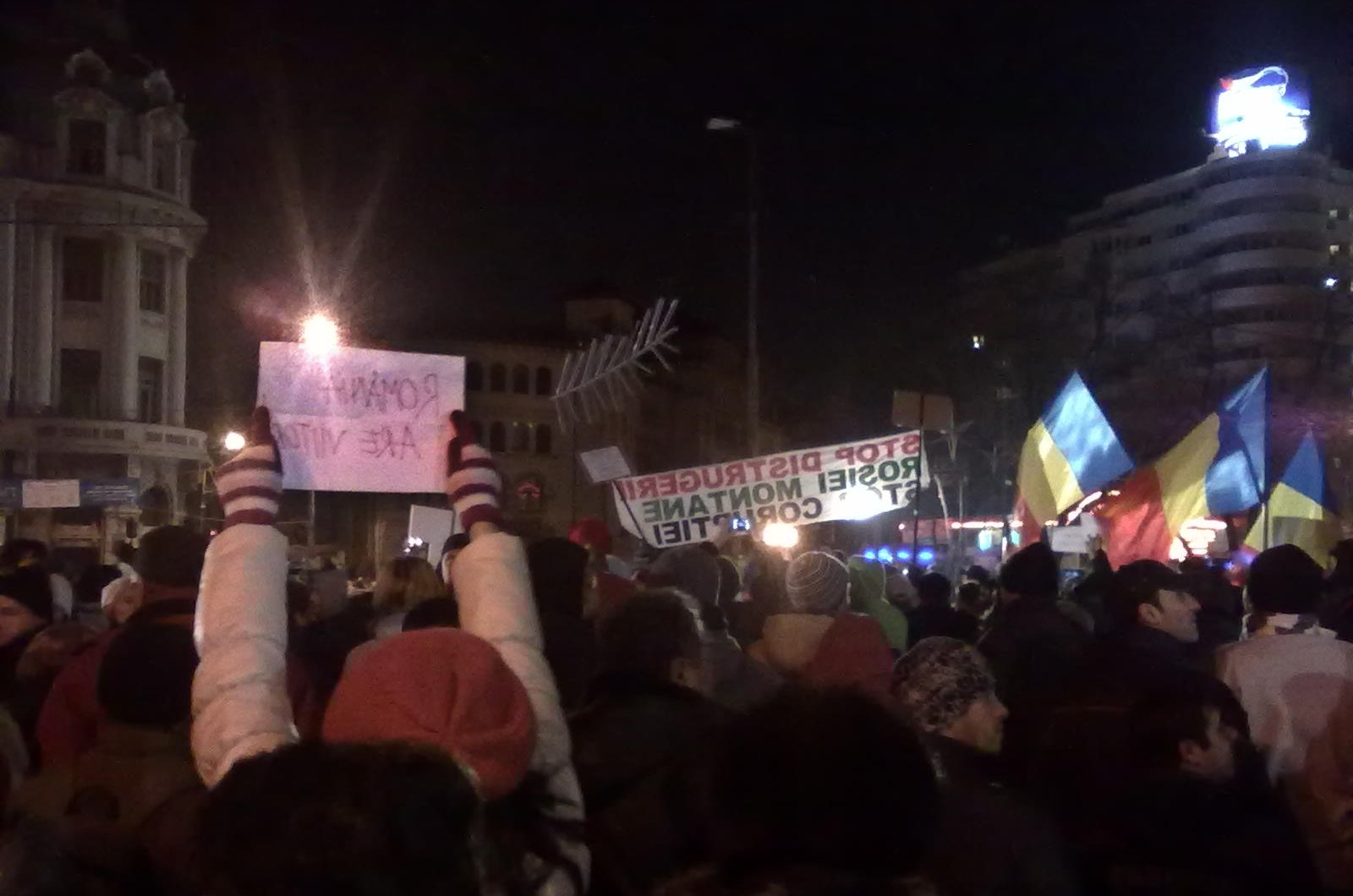
Protesters in University Square, Bucharest, January 15, 2012

- January 12: Protests against President Traian Băsescu and government begin with over 3,500 people attending the revolt in Bucharest and thousands others protesting in additional cities, like Timișoara, Cluj-Napoca, Constanța or Iași. Following these street demonstrations, over 60 people were injured and other 240 citizens were arrested by the Romanian Gendarmerie.
- January 24: A violent blizzard ravages Romania, killing 86 people. The lowest temperature in recent decades, −32.5 °C (−26.5 °F), was recorded this winter at Întorsura Buzăului, in Covasna County.

=== February ===
- February 6: Prime Minister Emil Boc resigned from office amid ongoing anti-austerity protests. Mihai Răzvan Ungureanu was given a mandate by President Traian Băsescu to form a new government. He will have to pass his formed cabinet through the vote of the Parliament or else he must return the mandate to the President. Ungureanu vowed to continue reforms and promote Romania's economic and politic stability amid current continuing crisis.
- February 13: Nanosatellite Goliath was successfully launched into space. This is the first satellite of Romania.
- February 19: A series of explosions take place in a club in Sighetu Marmaţiei (Maramureș County). Following the deflagration, a citizen was killed and other 20 people were injured.

=== March ===
- March 5: A MAI employer shot eight people in a hair salon, Bucharest. Following the massacre, two people died and six others were seriously injured. The attacker was arrested for murder. He received the mandate for 24 hours. In 2005, the attacker has been charged with violence, but was acquitted.
- March 19: A series of devastating wildfires burst out in several counties. At least a man died after falling in fire started by him.

=== April ===
- April 6: Six people, including three Austrians, were injured in an explosion at the Petrobrazi Refinery (Ploiești, Prahova County).
- April 14: A devastating fire broke out at a commercial complex in Iași. During the intervention, two firefighters suffered burns and were intoxicated by smoke. The building collapsed to 10 hours after the outbreak of fire.
- April 15: County road 205D collapsed on a stretch of about 50 m due to landslides caused by heavy rains in recent days. At least 4,000 people in the communes of Nereju and Spulber (Vrancea County) are isolated. Affected villages remained without electricity, gas and drinking water.
- April 26
  - A helicopter crashed near the village of Ostrov (Tulcea County), due to a failure on board. All five passengers died carbonized.
  - An overloaded passenger bus has overturned from a gangway near the town of Mioveni (Argeș County). 30 of 38 passengers on board were hospitalized.
- April 27: The government has been unseated in a no-confidence vote, just two months after taking office. The opposition seized on public anger over austerity measures to oust prime minister Mihai Răzvan Ungureanu. President Traian Băsescu designated left-wing opposition leader Victor Ponta as new prime minister.

=== May ===
- May 2: "Prometheus", work signed by Constantin Brâncuși, in 1911, representing a head cast in bronze has sold for a record US$12,682,000 in an auction in New York City.
- May 10: More than 116 people were injured, when three trams have collided in chain in Pasajul Lujerului (Bucharest).

=== June ===
- June 6: Severe windstorms, thunderstorms and hailstorms hit Romania. Several localities were flooded due to heavy rains in late-May and early-June. Roads were blocked due to landslides and rockfalls. At least five people were killed from the break out of violent storms.
- June 10: Local elections in Romania. Social Liberal Union won at least 49.71% of votes, dethroning the Democratic Liberal Party, that won only 14.8% of votes. Following the local elections, members of PDL resigned. Elections have resulted in conflicts between citizens and law enforcement.
- June 20
  - Five people died and another one was wounded following an accident involving two freight trucks and a passenger car near the village of Limpeziș (Buzău County). One of the trucks caught fire. The circulation on European route E85 was blocked for four hours.
  - Former Prime Minister of Romania, Adrian Năstase, tried to commit suicide after High Court of Cassation and Justice convicted him to a two-year imprisonment term for corruption charges.

=== July ===
- July 6
  - Romanian Parliament voted for President Băsescu's suspension amid allegations of violation of the Constitution and abuse of power. Decisive national referendum set for July 29.
  - A magnitude 4.5 earthquake struck 6 km SW Nereju (Vrancea County), at a depth of 113 km. The tremor was felt from Chișinău to Sofia. No reports of damage or casualties.
- July 18: 18 people were injured in an accident involving two trams in Bucharest's Rahova neighbourhood.

=== August ===
- August 10: Eight people were killed and seven others were injured, following an accident, in which were involved four vehicles. One of them caught fire.
- August 12: 1,000 tourists feared to be infected with HIV after having sex with a prostitute in Constanța County.
- August 21: The Constitutional Court of Romania decided to invalidate the results of the referendum for the impeachment of President Traian Băsescu.
- August 27: One man died and another 18 were injured, after a passenger bus was hit by an oil car in Suceava County. Traffic in the area was blocked for three hours.

=== September ===
- September 19: Two people were killed and four others were gravely wounded by a rabid bear in Southern Carpathians. The local authorities decreed state of alert in the area until its shooting or, eventually, until bears vaccination against rabies.

=== December ===
- December 17: President Traian Băsescu had designated Victor Ponta as Prime Minister of Romania, this being the single proposal from representatives of political parties and national minorities in Romania's Parliament.
- December 28: Five people died intoxicated in a disused mine shaft in Baia Mare, Maramureș County.

== Earthquakes ==
Date	Time	Epicenter	Magnitude	Depth
January 19	18:05	7 km N Gura Teghii	4.0 M_{L}	117 km
April 26	14:32	11 km NW Lopătari	4.0 M_{L}	126 km
May 5	17:07	15 km W Nereju	4.0 M_{L}	119 km
July 6	22:48	6 km SW Nereju	4.5 M_{b}	113 km
July 12	02:20	13 km W Nereju	4.3 M_{b}	114 km
August 31	20:22	7 km NW Gura Teghii	4.1 M_{L}	127 km
September 9	19:53	18 km NW Valea Râmnicului	4.0 M_{L}	148 km
October 1	17:26	4 km NW Nereju	4.2 M_{L}	82 km

- Note: The list includes only M4.0+ earthquakes.
- Source: European-Mediterranean Seismological Centre

== Arts and entertainment ==
- January 1: Andrei Leonte wins the first season of X Factor.
- January 1: "I Follow Rivers" becomes the first number-one single in the Romanian Top 100.
- January 1: Song "Stereo Love" by Romanian/Moldovan duo Edward Maya, Vika Jigulina becomes the first Romanian One-hit wonder in the United States, and also the first registered US One-hit wonder of 2011.
- January 11: Alexandra Stan wins the EBBA award for Best New Act.
- January 13: Romania announces its participation on the Eurovision Song Contest 2012.
- January 13: Dance music sensation Inna kicks off her second world tour I Am the Club Rocker Tour in Belgrade, Serbia.
- April 21: Romexpo in Bucharest was turned into "The Ocean of White" for the debut of Sensation Romania.
- April 22: The beloved Spanish artist David Bisbal concerts at Palace Hall in Bucharest.
- May 26: Mandinga occupied the 12th place at Eurovision Song Contest 2012, with the song "Zaleilah", composed by Costi Ioniță.
- June 6: Americans from Linkin Park concerts for the first time in Romania at Romexpo in Bucharest.
- June 30: Julio Iglesias, the best selling and most famous Spanish singer of all time, concerts on Zone Arena in Bucharest.
- July 19: Roxette concerts on Cluj Arena in Cluj-Napoca, stadium that hosted the concerts of the Scorpions and Smokie in the fall of 2011.
- July 28: Jessie J concerts in Mamaia, during their 2011/2012 world tour Heartbeat Tour.
- August 6: Placebo members concert for the third time in Romania, on Iolanda Balaș Söter Stadium in Bucharest.
- August 18: Pop sensation Lady Gaga has her first concert in Romania, at the National Arena in Bucharest, as part of her 2012/2014 world tour The Born This Way Ball Tour.
- August 19: Brazilian singer-songwriter Michel Teló also has his first concert in Romania, at the Princess Summer Club in Mamaia.
- August 31: Red Hot Chili Peppers concerts at National Arena, Bucharest during their 2011/2012 world tour I'm with You Tour.
- October 4: Redfoo and Party Rock Crew concert at the Roman Arenas, Bucharest. Concert organized by Unilife is part of the promotional tour of the album "Sorry for Party Rocking".
- December 24: Tudor Turcu wins the second season of X Factor.

== Sports ==
- January 29: Horia Tecău and his partner, Bethanie Mattek-Sands, wins the tennis tournament 2012 Australian Open, at mixed double.
- February 29: Amicable match between Uruguay, the first recipient of FIFA World Cup, and Romania, 1-1.
- May 9: The 2012 UEFA Europa League Final is held at the National Arena in Bucharest.
- September 6: Phase V of 2011–12 Cupa României.

== Deaths ==
=== January ===
- January 2: Ioan Drăgan, 46, footballer (FC Brașov), colorectal cancer. (born 1965)
- January 14: Mircea Ciumara, 68, politician and former cabinet minister, cancer. (born 1943)
- January 22: Tudor Mărăscu, 71, theater and film director. (born 1940)
- January 25: Emil Hossu, 70, actor, myocardial infarction. (born 1941)

=== March ===
- March 28: Ștefan Radof, 77, actor, screenwriter and author of several volumes of poetry, heart failure. (born 1934)
- March 31: Ion Lucian, 87, actor and epigramist, bronchopneumonia and anemia. (born 1924)

=== April ===
- April 12: Gabriel Țepelea, 96, academician, former Vice President of CDNPP. (born 1916)
- April 14: Florin Constantiniu, 79, historian, corresponding member of the Romanian Academy. (born 1933)

=== June ===
- June 5: Mihai Pătrașcu, 29, computer scientist, brain cancer. (born 1982)

=== August ===
- August 2: Mihaela Ursuleasa, 33, concert pianist, cerebral hemorrhage. (born 1978)
- August 10: Ioan Dicezare, 95, fighter pilot and flying ace in World War II. (born 1916)
- August 27: Mirela Zafiri, 41, soprano, lung cancer. (born 1971)
- August 30: Cornel Todea, 76, theater and film director. (born 1935)
- August 31: Constanța Buzea, 71, poet. (born 1941)

=== November ===
- 9 November: Iurie Darie, 83, actor. (born 1929)

== See also ==
- 2012 Romanian local election
- 2012 Romanian legislative election
- List of 2012 box office number-one films in Romania
- 2012 in the European Union
- 2012 in Europe
- Romania in the Eurovision Song Contest 2012
- Romania at the 2012 Summer Olympics
- Romania at the 2012 Summer Paralympics
- Romania at the 2012 Winter Youth Olympics
