= Hungarian Union (Romania) =

The Hungarian Union (Romanian: Uniunea Maghiara, UM) was a political party in Romania representing the Hungarian minority.

== History ==
The party was established on 6 July 1921, with Sámuel Jósika as its first president. Its activities were suspended by the Romanian government on 30 October, based on a historical law banning political parties based on ethnic lines. On 15 January 1922 István Kecskeméthy became its new president, and the government allowed the party to resume activities shortly before the March 1922 elections.

In the elections the party won three seats in the Chamber of Deputies. However, it was banned against shortly after the election. On 20 November it was agreed to merge with the Transylvanian People’s Party to form the new Magyar Party.

== Electoral history ==
=== Legislative elections ===
Election	Chamber			Senate			Position
Election	Votes	%	Seats	Votes	%	Seats	Position
1922			3 / 372			0 / 148	8th
