= Romanian dynastic crisis =

The dynastic crisis (Romanian: criza dinastică) of the Kingdom of Romania began in December 1925, when Prince Carol II stated he would renounce his rights to the throne, and ended in June 1930, when he deposed his young son and took the throne for himself.
