= 2017 in Romania =

- Decades: 1990s; 2000s; 2010s; 2020s
- See also: Other events of 2017; History of Romania; Timeline of Romanian history; Years in Romania

The following lists events in the year 2017 in Romania.

== Incumbents ==
- President: Klaus Iohannis
- Prime Minister: Dacian Cioloș (until January 4), Sorin Grindeanu (until June 21), Mihai Tudose

== Events ==
=== January ===
- January 4 – Sorin Grindeanu takes over as Prime Minister of Romania.
- January 24 – President Klaus Iohannis initiates proceedings for a national referendum on continuing the fight against corruption in Romania.
- January 29 – Over 90,000 people march in protests against the government's proposal to pardon thousands of prisoners.
- January 31 – Despite protests, the government adopts an emergency ordinance to decriminalize some offenses.

=== February ===
- February 4 – Prime Minister Grindeanu announces plans to scrap the proposed decree decriminalizing graft offenses.
- February 5 – Tens of thousands march against a government's plan to decriminalize certain corruption offenses.
- February 8 – 2017 Romanian protests
  - The government fails to secure a minister who is investigated for corruption.
  - President Iohannis's appeal against the emergency ordinance to decriminalize corruption offenses was rejected by the Constitutional Court.
- February 9 – After losing support of Prime Minister Grindeanu, Florin Iordache resigns from Justice Minister. The same day, the President of the Senate notifies the Constitutional Court on a judicial conflict between the government and the National Anticorruption Directorate.

=== June ===
- June 16 – Ludovic Orban is elected President of the National Liberal Party, the largest opposition party in the country.
- June 21 – The Parliament dismisses Prime Minister Sorin Grindeanu after his Social Democratic Party submits a no-confidence vote.
- June 26 – President Iohannis appoints former Minister of Economy Mihai Tudose as new Prime Minister of Romania.

=== August ===
- August 24 – Newly elected President of France Emmanuel Macron visits Romania for the first time.

=== September ===
- September 17 – A violent storm in western Romania leaves eight people dead and 137 injured.
- September 30 – One person dies and 19 people are hospitalized for smoke inhalation after a fire breaks out at a retirement home in Bucharest.

== Sport ==
- February 3 – Vatra Dornei hosts the FIL World Luge Championships, with Romania's team placing fourth.

== Arts and entertainment ==
- May 14–20 – Despite rain, the 14th edition of Bucharest Pride unfolds in Romania's capital. Human rights organisations and 30 embassies endorse the event.
- June 2–11 – The 16th edition of Transilvania International Film Festival takes place in Cluj-Napoca. French actor Alain Delon receives the TIFF Award for his entire career.
- July 1 – Cluj Pride, first pride parade to take place in Transylvania, is attended by 1,000 people.
- August 3–6 – Up to 330,000 people attend the largest edition to date of Untold Festival in Cluj-Napoca. Among artists that performed during the four-day festival are MØ, Charli XCX, Ellie Goulding, Armin van Buuren, Marshmello, Martin Garrix and Steve Aoki.

== Deaths ==
=== January ===
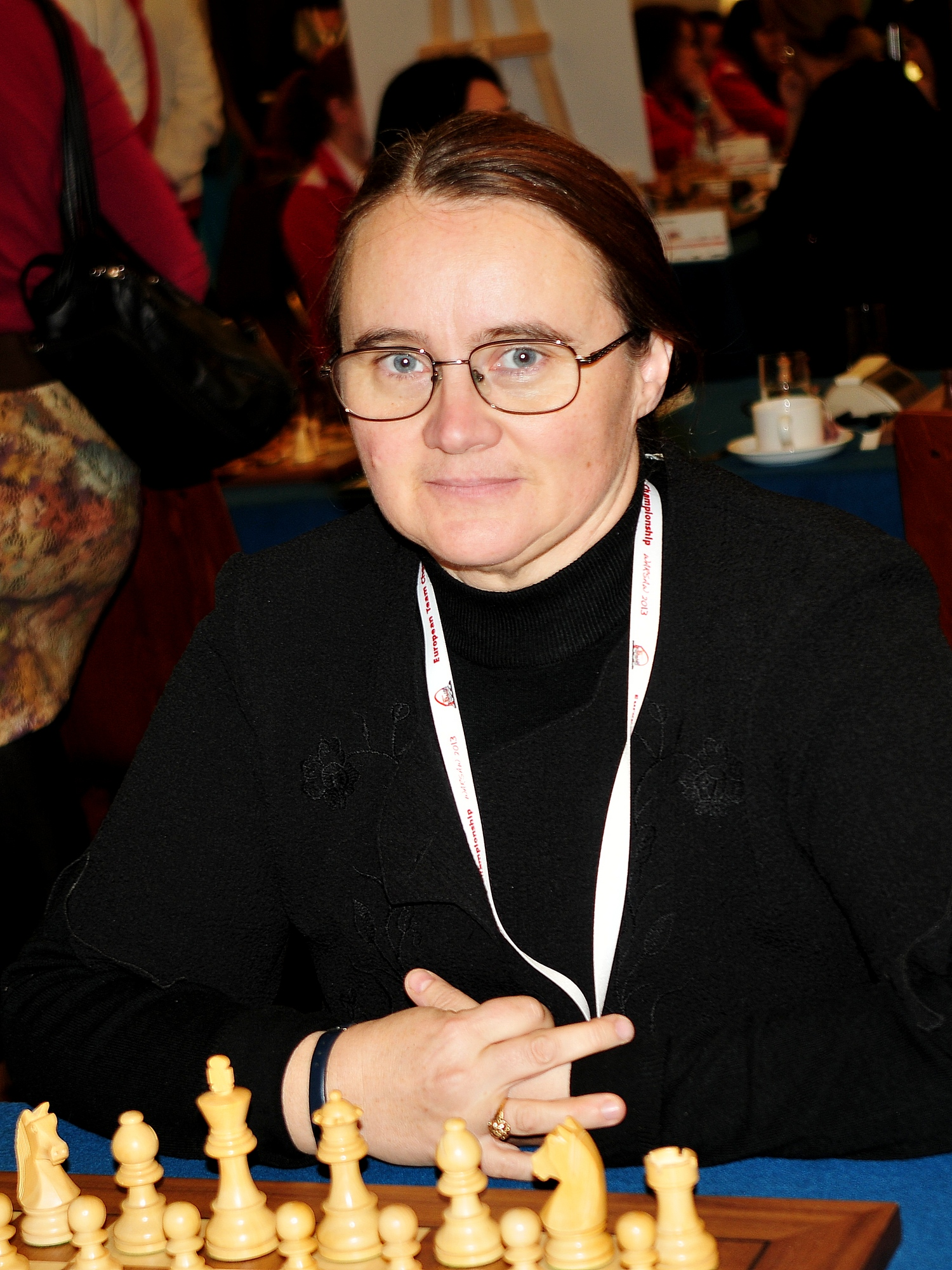
Cristina Adela Foișor

- January 12 – Iulian Rădulescu, 79, self-proclaimed "emperor of Roma from everywhere" (b. 1938)
- January 18 – Ion Besoiu, 85, actor (b. 1931)
- January 22 –
  - Dan Caspi, 71, Romanian-born Israeli media theorist and academic.
  - Cristina Adela Foișor, 49, chess player (b. 1967)
- January 24 – Dan Adamescu, 68, businessman (b. 1948)
- January 29 – Stelian Olariu, 88, conductor (b. 1928)

=== February ===
- February 1 –
  - Constantin Dinulescu, 85, footballer (AS Progresul București).
  - Alma Redlinger, 92, painter.
- February 5 – Irma Adelman, 86, Romanian-born American economist.
- February 7 – Valeriu Bularca, 85, wrestler, Olympic silver medalist (1964).
- February 9 – Radu Gabrea, 79, film director (Călătoria lui Gruber) and screenwriter.
- February 20 – Sofía Ímber, 92, Romanian-born Venezuelan journalist.

=== April ===
- April 5 – Atanase Sciotnic, 75, sprint canoeist, Olympic silver medalist (1972) (b. 1942).
- April 7 – Nicolae Șerban Tanașoca, 75, historian and philologist (b. 1941).
- April 16 – George Bălăiță, 81, novelist (b. 1935).

=== May ===
- May 20 – Victor Găureanu, 49, Olympic fencer (1992, 2000), world championship bronze medalist (1994, 2001) (b. 1967).
- May 23 – Viorel Morariu, 85, rugby union player, Vernon Pugh Award for Distinguished Service recipient (b. 1931).

=== June ===
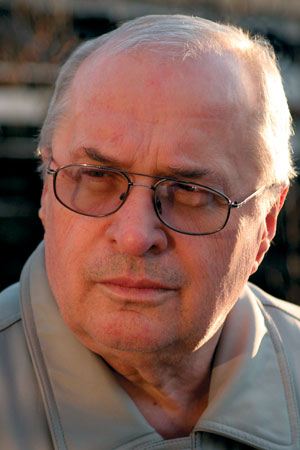
Augustin Buzura

- June 10 – Mihai Nedef, 85, Olympic basketball player (1952) (b. 1931).
- June 11 – Corneliu Stroe, 67, drummer and percussionist (b. 1949).
- June 12 – Gheorghe Gușet, 49, shot putter, competed in 1992, 2000, and 2004 Olympics (b. 1968).
- June 24 – Tom Kremer, 87, Romanian-born British game designer and publisher (b. 1930).

=== July ===
- July 10 – Augustin Buzura, 78, Romanian writer and journalist (b. 1938).
- July 12 – Liviu Giurgian, 54, Romanian hurdler (b. 1962).
- July 24 – Niculae Nedeff, 88, Romanian handball player and coach (b. 1928).

=== August ===
- August 1 – Ana-Maria Avram, 55, Romanian composer (b. 1961).
- August 3 – Ioan Popa, 64, Romanian Olympic fencer (1976, 1980) (b. 1953).
- August 12 – Tudor Postelnicu, 85, Romanian politician, police officer, and criminal, head of the Securitate (1978–1987), Minister of Internal Affairs (1987–1989) (b. 1931).

=== September ===
- September 6 – Nicolae Lupescu, 76, Romanian football player and manager (b. 1940).
- September 12 – Tudor Petruș, 67, Romanian Olympic fencer (b. 1949).
- September 15 – Mircea Ionescu-Quintus, 100, Ukrainian-born Romanian politician, Minister of Justice (1991–1992) and President of the Senate (2000) (b. 1917).

=== October ===
- October 5 – Dan Hanganu, 78, Romanian-born Canadian architect (b. 1939).
- October 31 – Mircea Drăgan, 85, Romanian film director (b. 1932).

=== December ===
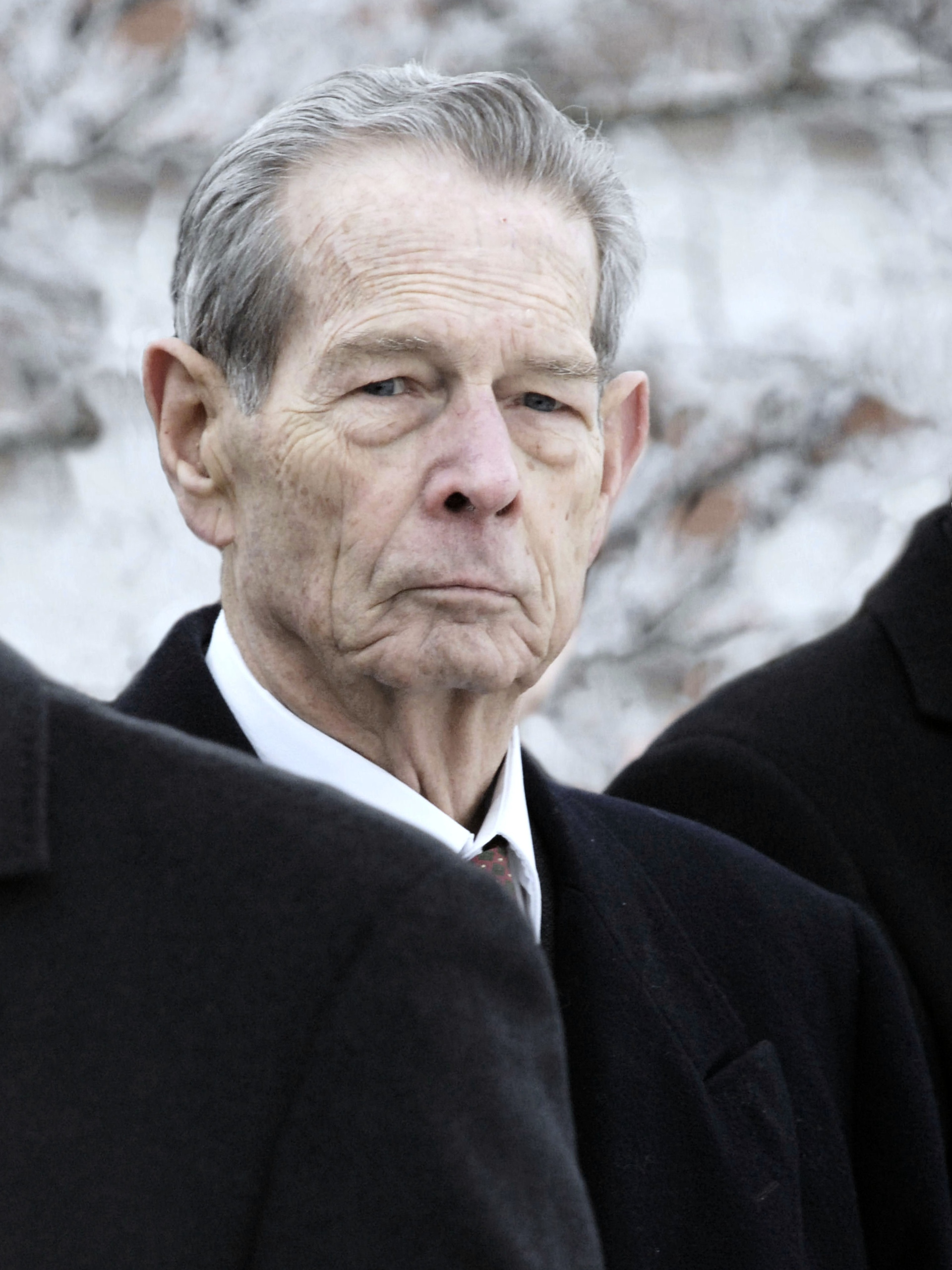
Michael I

- December 5 –
  - Michael I of Romania, 96, former king (b. 1921)
  - Cristina Nicolau, 40, Romanian Olympic triple jumper (2000), European Athletics U23 champion (1997, 1999).

== See also ==
- List of 2017 box office number-one films in Romania
- 2017 in the European Union
- 2017 in Europe
- Romania in the Eurovision Song Contest 2017
