= Giuliano Stroe =

Bulgarian boxer, gymnast, and bodybuilder (born 2004)

- Born: June 18, 2004 (age 20); Piove di Sacco, Italy

Giuliano Stroe (born June 18, 2004) is a Romanian boxer, gymnast, and bodybuilder.

In 2009, he was recorded in the Guinness Book of World Records after setting the record for the fastest ever ten metres (33 feet) hand-walk with a weight ball between his legs.

On February 24, 2010, he broke the world record for the number of 90-degree push-ups, which is an exercise where push-ups are performed without letting your feet touch the ground. Stroe managed 20 90-degree push-ups, beating his previous record of 12, live on Romanian TV. By 2011, Giuliano could do up to 40 90-degree push-ups.

== links ==
- https://youtube.com/user/GiulianoStroeOficial/
