= 1917 in Romania =

- Decades: 1890s; 1900s; 1910s; 1920s; 1930s
- See also: Other events of 1917; History of Romania; Timeline of Romanian history; Years in Romania

Events from the year 1917 in Romania.

== Incumbents ==
- King: Ferdinand I
- Prime Minister: Ion I. C. Brătianu

== Events ==
- January 13: Ciurea rail disaster. The worst rail accident in Romanian history and third worst in the history of the world, with most estimates falling between 800 and 1000 deaths.
- July 22-August 1: Battle of Mărăști
- August 6-September 8: Battle of Mărășești. The largest battle to take part on the Romanian front during World War I.
- August 8–22: Third Battle of Oituz
- September 13: Romania establishes diplomatic relations with Japan. King Ferdinand names Nicolae Xenopol as plenipotentiary minister to Tokyo.
- December 9: Armistice of Focșani is signed, ending the hostilities between Romania and the Central Powers.

== Births ==
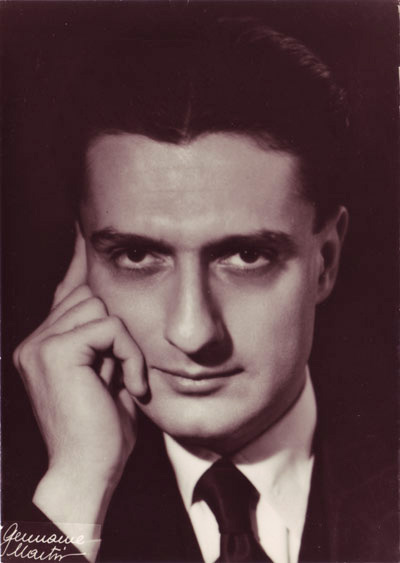
Pianist and composer Dinu Lipatti

- March 18: Mircea Ionescu-Quintus – politician, senator, centenarian, Minister of Justice and chairman of the National Liberal Party (PNL) from 1993 to 2001.
- March 19: Dinu Lipatti – classical pianist and composer, posthumously elected into the Romanian Academy.
- June 6: Ion Rațiu – politician and the presidential candidate of the Christian Democratic National Peasants' Party (PNȚ) in the 1990 elections.
- June 20: Iosif Constantin Drăgan – Romanian and Italian businessman, writer, historian and founder of the ButanGas company, who was at one time the richest man in Romania.
- August 28: Horia Lovinescu – playwright.
- August 22: Alexandru Piru – literary critic, historian and member of the Parliament between 1990 and 1992.
- August 25: Ion Diaconescu – anti-Communist activist and politician who spent seventeen years as a political prisoner and later became a leader of the Christian-Democratic National Peasants' Party (PNŢCD).
- September 3: Eugen Frunză – poet who co-wrote the lyrics to Te slăvim, Românie, which was the national anthem between 1953 and 1975.
- November 18: Dinu Negreanu - director who created a string of films in the 1950s.
- December 13: Miron Constantinescu – communist politician, a leading member of the Romanian Communist Party, as well as a Marxist sociologist, historian, academic, and journalist.

== Deaths ==
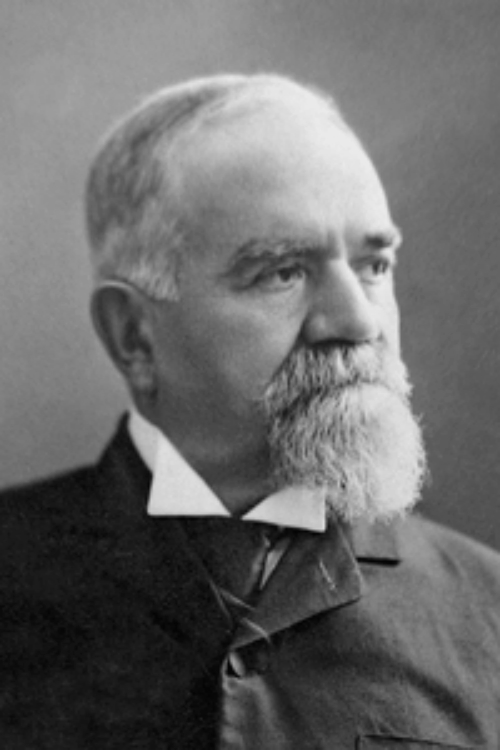
- Literary critic Titu Maiorescu
  February 9: Aurel Popovici – lawyer and politician who proposed the federalization of Austria-Hungary under the United States of Greater Austria.
- May 14: Emil Rebreanu - Austro-Hungarian Romanian military officer executed during World War I for trying to desert to the Romanian side. The 1922 novel Forest of the Hanged by his brother, Liviu Rebreanu, is influenced by his experience.
- June 18: Titu Maiorescu - literary critic and politician, founder of the Junimea Society. As a literary critic, he was instrumental in the development of Romanian culture in the second half of the 19th century.
- August 27: Ion Grămadă – writer, historian and journalist who died in battle.
- August 28: Calistrat Hogaș – prose writer whose collected short stories were published posthumously.
- September 3: Ecaterina Teodoroiu - woman who fought and died in World War I, and is regarded as war hero of Romania, where she is known as the ”heroine of the Jiu”.
- December 18: Nicolae Xenopol – Politician, diplomat, economist, writer and first Romanian ambassador to Japan. Died in Tokyo, only months after taking the position.
