= 1916 in Romania =

- Decades: 1890s; 1900s; 1910s; 1920s; 1930s
- See also: Other events of 1916; History of Romania; Timeline of Romanian history; Years in Romania

Events from the year 1916 in Romania.

== Incumbents ==
- King: Ferdinand I
- Prime Minister: Ion I. C. Brătianu

== Events ==
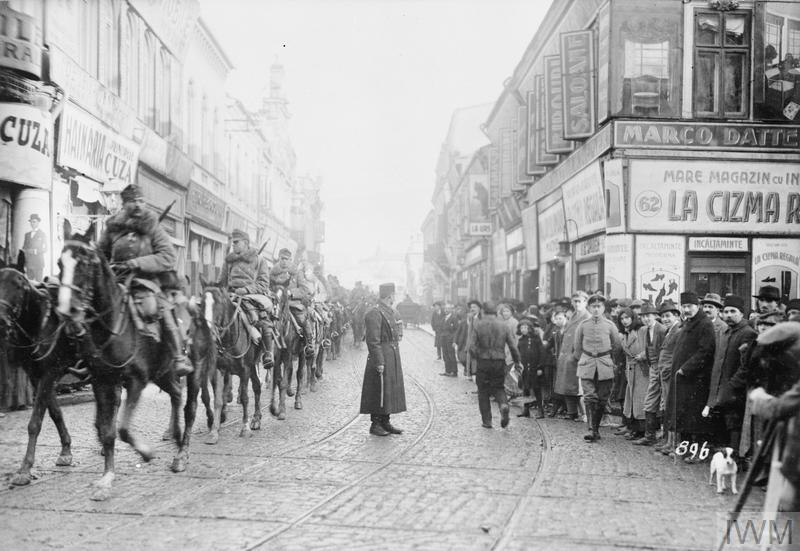
Austro-Hungarian cavalry entering Bucharest on 6 December 1916

- August 27 – Romania declares war on Austria-Hungary. The Romanian Army begins an offensive in Transylvania.
- August 27-November 26 – Battle of Transylvania - Although initially successful, the offensive was brought to a halt after Bulgaria's attack on Dobruja. Coupled with a successful German and Austro-Hungarian counterattack after September 18, the Romanian Army was eventually forced to retreat back to the Carpathians by late October.
- September 2–6 – Battle of Turtucaia
- September 5–7 – Battle of Dobrich
- September 17–19 – First Battle of Cobadin
- September 29-October 5 – Flămânda Offensive
- October 19–25 – Second Battle of Cobadin
- November 25 – The entire state apparatus is evacuated from Bucharest to Iași in anticipation of the Battle of Bucharest.
- November 25 – December 6 - Battle of Bucharest
- November 28 – Prunaru Charge
- December 1 – Battle of the Argeș
- December 6 – After the fall of Bucharest, Iași becomes the country's wartime capital, holding this position until the end of the war.
- December 25 – The law transferring the Romanian Treasure to Moscow for safekeeping is passed. The Treasure would never entirely return to Romania.

== Births ==
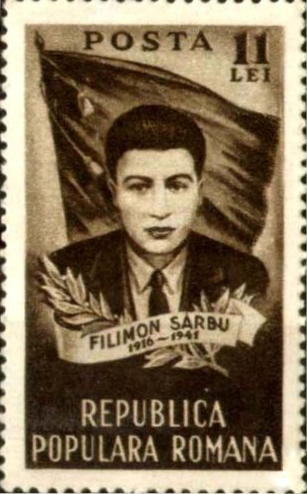
Stamp of the Romanian People's Republic depicting Filimon Sârbu.

- January 16 – Elena Ceaușescu, communist politician and wife of Nicolae Ceaușescu
- February 6 – Gabriel Țepelea, politician, intellectual, political prisoner, and honorary member of the Romanian Academy.
- April 17 – Magda Isanos, lawyer, poet, and writer.
- May 4 – Alexander Ratiu, priest, political prisoner, and author (died 2002).
- May 12 – Constantin Ciopraga, literary historian and critic, writer and honorary member of the Romanian Academy.
- August 9 – Manea Mănescu, communist politician who served as Prime Minister from 1974 to 1979 (died 2009).
- August 10 – Filimon Sârbu, Romanian communist activist and anti-fascist militant executed by the pro-Nazi authorities during World War II. He was later acclaimed as a hero by the communist government.
- August 10 – Ioan Dicezare, fighter pilot and flying ace in World War II (died 2012).
- August 18 – Neagu Djuvara, historian, essayist, philosopher, journalist, novelist, diplomat and centenarian.
- November 7 – Mihai Șora, philosopher, essayist, centenarian and honorary member of the Romanian Academy. (died 2023)
- November 18 – Alexandru Dragomir, philosopher and student of Heidegger.

== Deaths ==
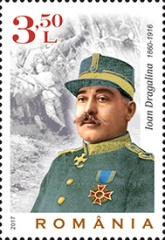
Postage stamp depicting general Ion Dragalina

- March 2 – Queen Elisabeth of Romania, also known as Elisabeth of Wied and under her literary pseudonym, Carmen Sylva.
- June 28 – Ștefan Luchian, painter, famous for his landscapes and still life works, of the most important artists of Fin de siècle Romania.
- October 13 – David Praporgescu, brigadier general, killed in action at the Battle of the Southern Carpathians (born 1865).
- November 9 – Ion Dragalina, general who died during World War I in the Battle of the Jiu Valley (born 1860).
