= 2018 in Romania =

- Decades: 1990s; 2000s; 2010s; 2020s
- See also: Other events of 2018; History of Romania; Timeline of Romanian history; Years in Romania

Events from the year 2018 in Romania.

== Incumbents ==
President

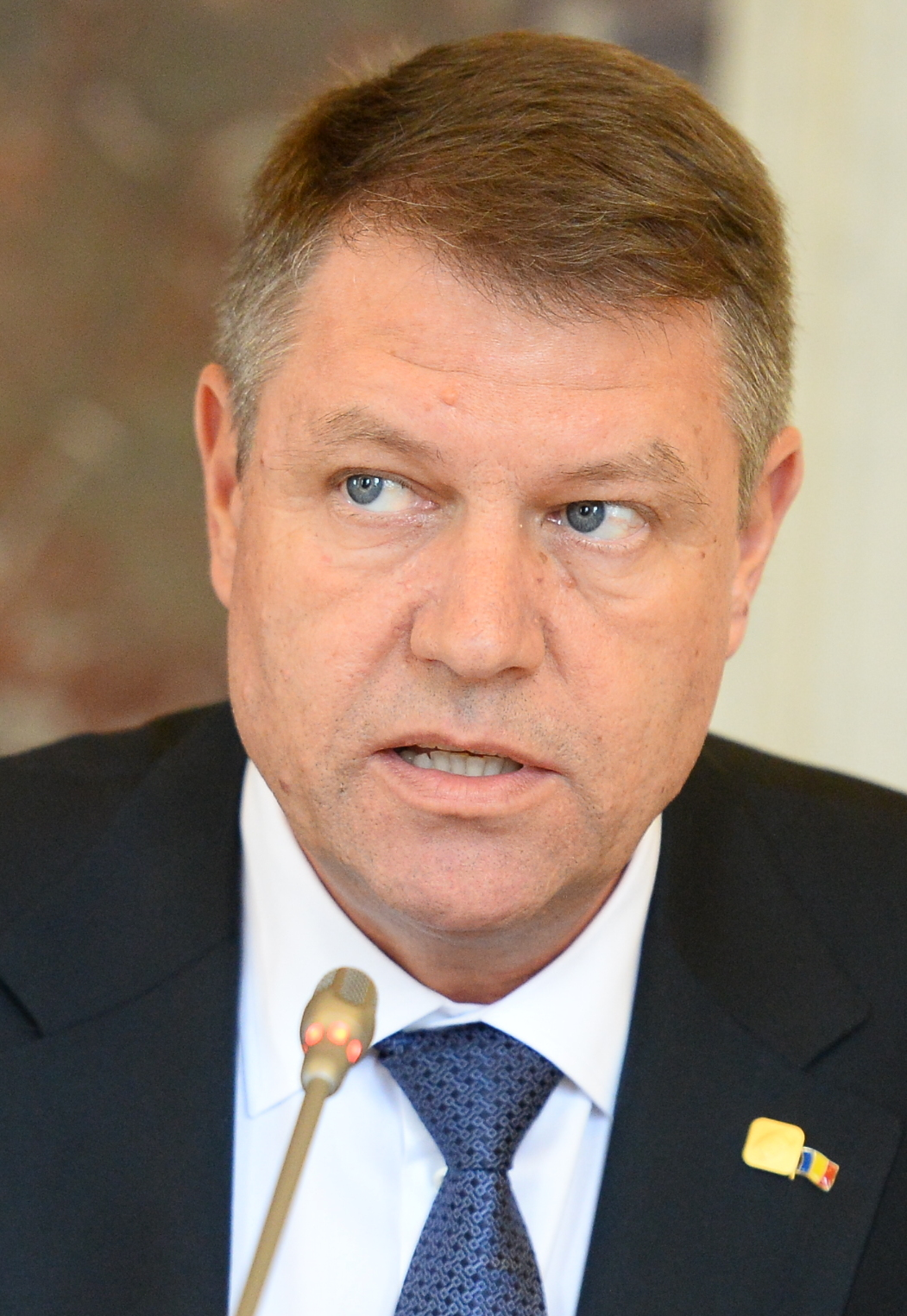
Klaus Iohannis (since 2014)

Prime Minister

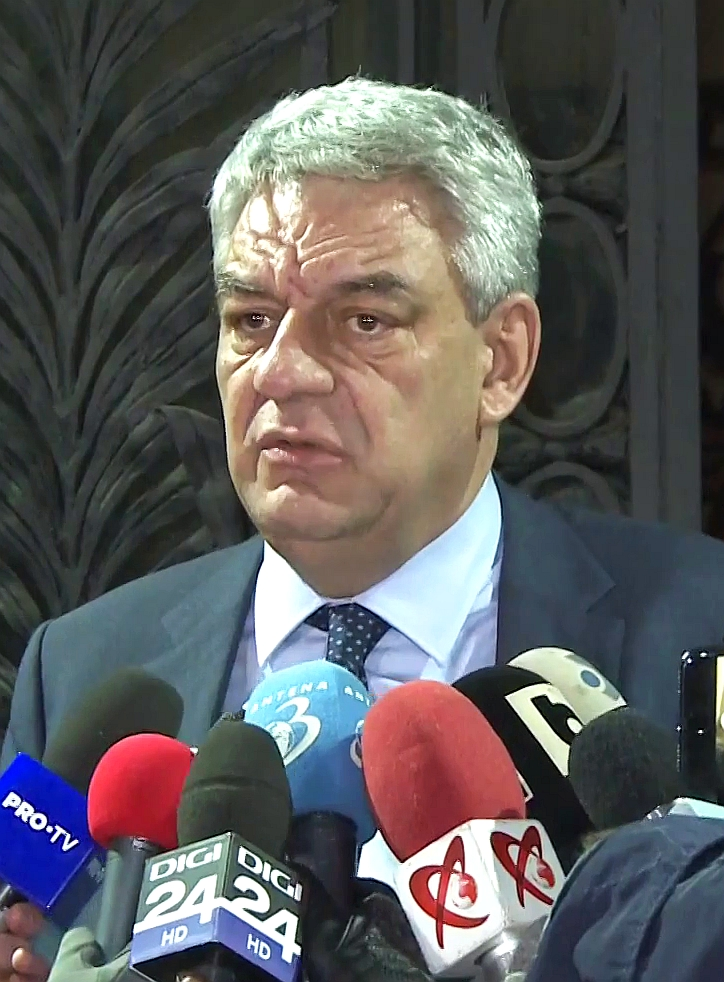
Mihai Tudose (until 15 January)

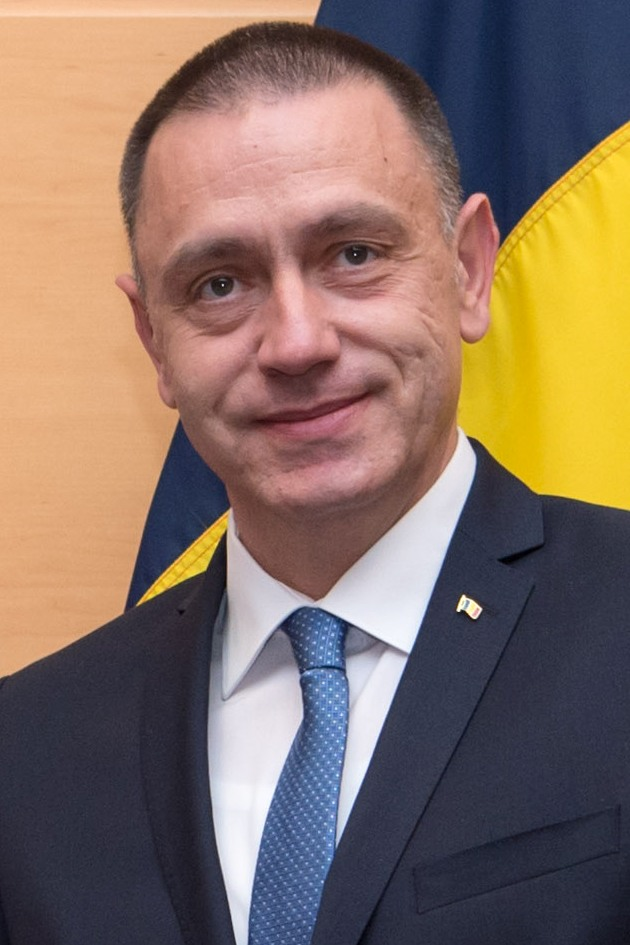
Mihai Fifor (acting, 15–29 January)

President of the Senate

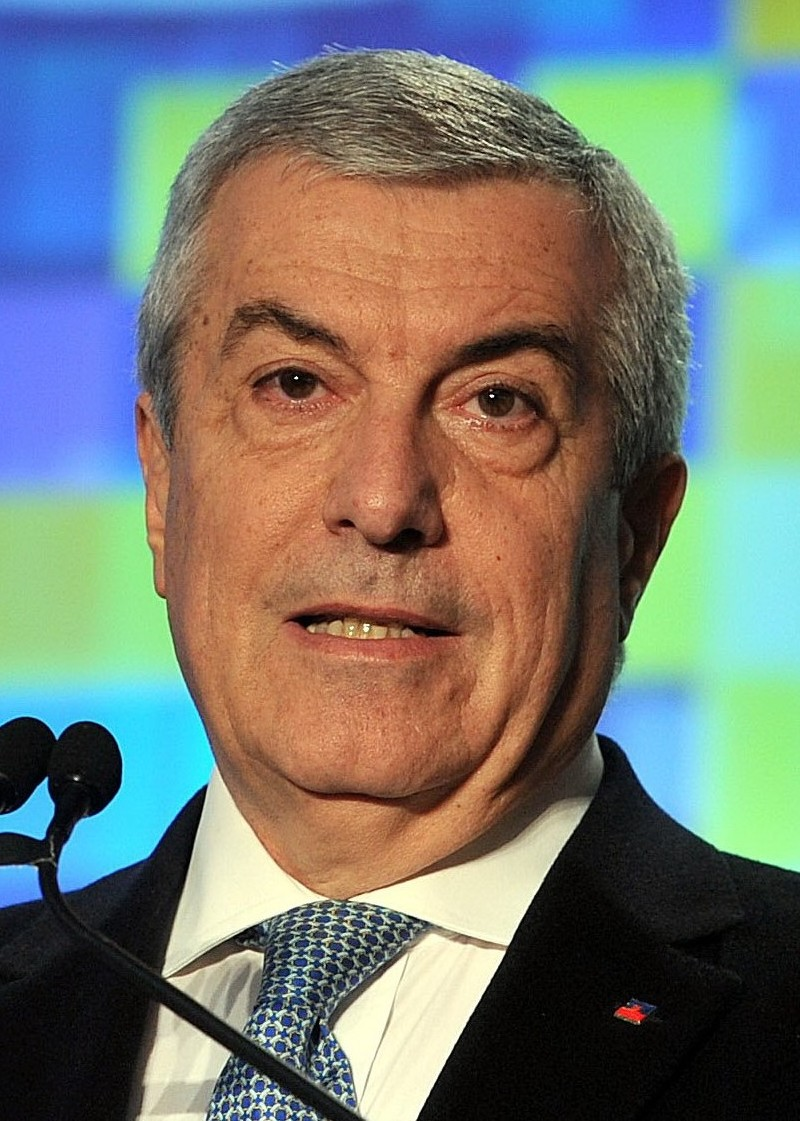
Călin Popescu-Tăriceanu (since 2014)

President of the Chamber of Deputies

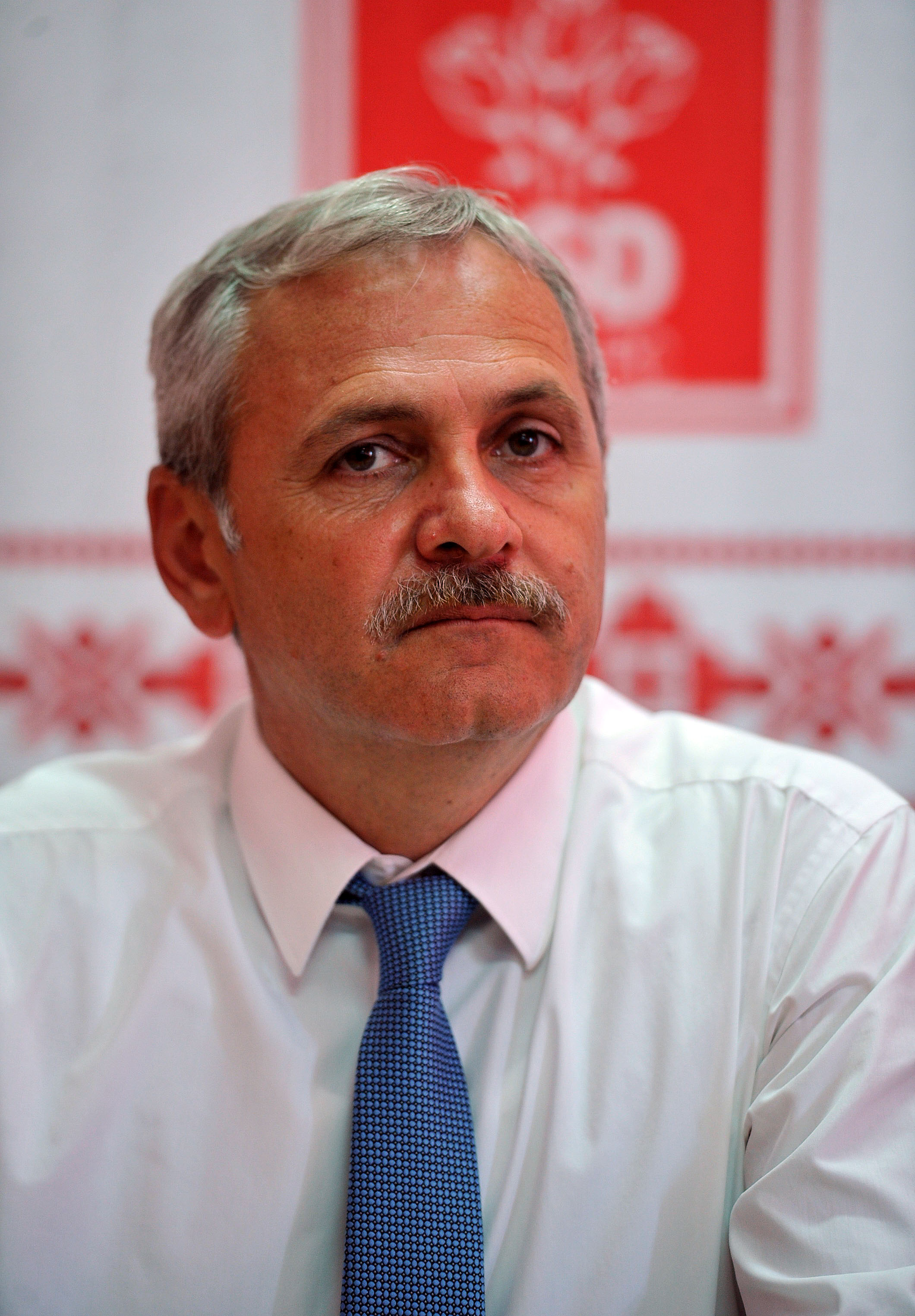
Liviu Dragnea (since 2016)

== Events ==
Months:
- January
- February
- March
- April
- May
- June
- July
- August
- September
- October
- November
- December

=== January ===
- 11 January – Prime Minister Mihai Tudose threatens the Hungarian Székely community in a television interview by saying that "If they hang the Székely flag [on institutions in Székely Land], they [the people who fly these flags] will hang alongside it. Autonomy for Székelys is out of the question."
- 15 January – Prime Minister Mihai Tudose resigns after his Social Democratic Party leaders withdraw their support following a party feud.
- 20 January – Tens of thousands of people protest in Romanian cities and abroad against amendments to the laws of justice and criminal codes.
- 29 January – The Romanian parliament approves Viorica Dăncilă as the country's first female premier. She is the third prime minister of Romania in less than 13 months.

=== February ===
- 22 February – Justice Minister Tudorel Toader announces that he will initiate the revocation procedure of Laura Codruța Kövesi from the post of chief prosecutor of the National Anticorruption Directorate. The announcement is followed by protests in several major cities in the country.

=== April ===
- 5 April – Nine people die after their minibus plunges into Bistrița River, near Viișoara, Neamț County.
- 11 April – Three tourists are found dead in Făgăraș Mountains after going missing since 30 March.
- 16 April – President Klaus Iohannis refuses to dismiss the chief prosecutor of the National Anticorruption Directorate, Laura Codruța Kövesi, also criticizing the report on which Justice Minister Tudorel Toader proposed the revocation of Kövesi. Toader announces that he will refer the Constitutional Court.
- 17 April – Former President Ion Iliescu is officially prosecuted for crimes against humanity for his role in the 1989 Revolution, alongside former Prime Minister Petre Roman.
- 19 April – President of the Chamber of Deputies Liviu Dragnea announces Government's intention to move Romania's embassy in Israel from Tel Aviv to Jerusalem.

=== June ===
- 9 June – More than 100,000 people assemble in Bucharest to protest alleged abuses committed by anti-corruption prosecutors. The protest is organised by the governing Social Democratic Party.
- 21 June – Liviu Dragnea, head of the Social Democratic Party, is convicted of abuse of power and handed a three-and-a-half-year sentence in an initial verdict after a corruption trial.
- 27 June – Dăncilă Cabinet survives a motion of no confidence. During the vote, several thousand opposition supporters protest outside Parliament, calling for the resignation of the government.
- 30 June – Four people are found dead and hundreds are evacuated from 185 flooded localities as hydrologists issue red flood warning in the counties of Covasna, Brașov and Bacău.

=== July ===
- 1 July – Celebrating the centenary of the Great Union (the unification of Romania with Bessarabia, Bukovina and Transylvania), a demonstration called the Centenary March is organized by several Romanian and Moldovan activists for unification. It starts in Alba Iulia on this day.
- 9 July – President Klaus Iohannis dismisses the Chief Prosecutor of the National Anticorruption Directorate, Laura Codruța Kövesi.
- 11 July – Four people, including two children, are found dead after their cart is washed away by a flash flood in Tulcea County.

=== August ===
- 10 August – Violence ensues between anti-government protesters and the Romanian Gendarmerie in Victory Square, resulting in hundreds of people wounded and the complete evacuation of the square.
- 29 August – Participants of the Centenary March cross the Moldovan border.

=== September ===
- 1 September – The Centenary March ends in the Great National Assembly Square in Chișinău, Moldova.

=== October ===
- 6 and 7 October – A nationwide referendum is held in Romania regarding the prohibition of same-sex marriage, but it fails due to not reaching the required voter turnout. Another referendum is held at the same time in the Olt County to rename it to "Olt-Romanați County", but it fails as well for the same reason.

=== December ===
- 19 December – The main indexes of Bucharest Stock Exchange fall by more than 7 percent following the announcement of new taxes on banks, capping gas prices and major changes regarding private pensions scheme. The two major banks listed at BSE lose more than 15 percent of their value.

== Arts and entertainment ==
- 24 February – Touch Me Not, directed by Adina Pintilie, wins the Golden Bear prize for best film at the 68th Berlin International Film Festival.
- 27 March – The 12th edition of the Gopo Awards: Daniel Sandu's One Step Behind the Seraphim is awarded best film, best director, best actor and best screenplay.
- 5 April – Ioan-Aurel Pop, rector of Babeș-Bolyai University in Cluj-Napoca, is elected president of the Romanian Academy.
- 10 May – The Humans represent Romania in the second semi-final of the Eurovision Song Contest in Lisbon, Portugal. For the first time since the introduction of the semi-finals, Romania's representatives fail to qualify for the final.
- 9 June – The largest edition to date of Bucharest Pride attracts about 10,000 people.
- 3–14 July – The 59th International Mathematical Olympiad is held in Cluj-Napoca.
- 2–5 August – The 4th edition of Untold Festival is held in Cluj-Napoca.

== Sports ==
- 9 June – Simona Halep wins her first Grand Slam title after defeating American Sloane Stephens in the French Open.

== Deaths ==
=== January ===
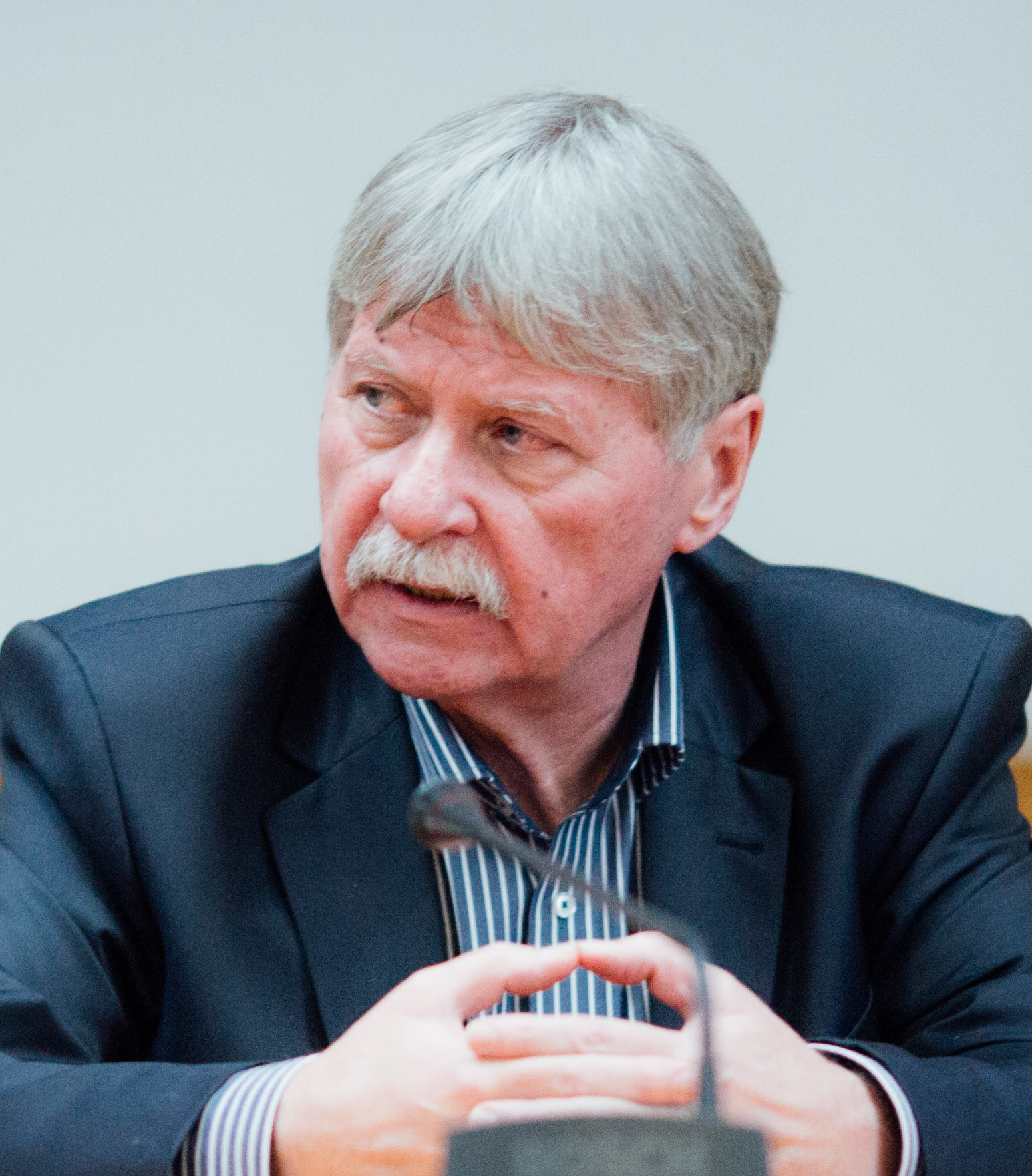
Attila Verestóy

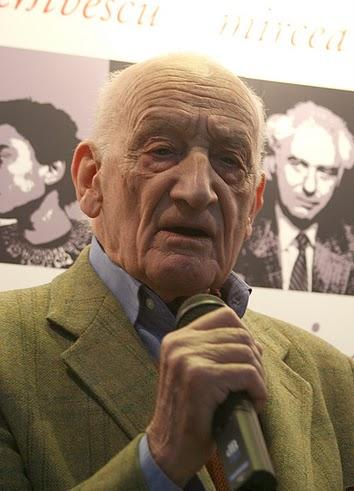
Neagu Djuvara

- 2 January – Garabet Kumbetlian, 81, intellectual, professor, engineer and researcher (b. 1936)
- 4 January – Aharon Appelfeld, 85, Romanian-born Israeli writer (b. 1932).
- 10 January –
  - Lucky Marinescu, 83, singer and television presenter (b. 1934)
  - Nicolae Edroiu, 78, academician and historian (b. 1939)
  - Ștefan Papadima, 64, mathematician (b. 1953)
- 11 January – Elisabeta Isanos, 76, writer (b. 1941)
- 24 January –
  - Ion D. Ion, 82, mathematician (b. 1935)
  - Attila Verestóy, 63, Romanian politician and chemical engineer, Senator (since 1990).
- 25 January – Neagu Djuvara, 101, Romanian historian, essayist and philosopher, pneumonia.

=== February ===
- 3 February – Alec Sehon, 93, Romanian-born Canadian immunologist (b. 1924).
- 10 February – Andrei Avram, 87, linguist (b. 1930)
- 13 February – Florin Diacu, 59, Romanian Canadian mathematician and author (b. 1959).
- 14 February – Zoltán Kallós, 91, folklorist (b. 1926)
- 16 February – Arsenie Voaideș, 67, Orthodox archimandrite and abbot of Berzunți Monastery (b. 1951)
- 19 February – Paul Urmuzescu, 89, composer (b. 1928)
- 22 February – Serban Cantacuzino, 89, Romanian architect.
- 28 February – Ștefan Tașnadi, 64, Romanian weightlifter, Olympic silver medalist (1984).

=== March ===
- 4 March – Traian Sabău, 76, politician (b. 1941)
- 6 March – Peter Freund, 81, Romanian-born American physicist.
- 9 March – Ion Voinescu, 88, Romanian Olympic footballer (1952).
- 13 March – Geta Caragiu, 88, sculptor (b. 1929)
- 19 March – Andrei Gheorghe (born 1962), 56, presenter and programme-maker
- 25 March – Nicolae Tilihoi, 61, Romanian footballer (Universitatea Craiova).
- 27 March – Aimée Iacobescu, 71, Romanian actress (The Doom), breast cancer.
- 28 March – Octavian Dincuță, 70, footballer

=== April ===
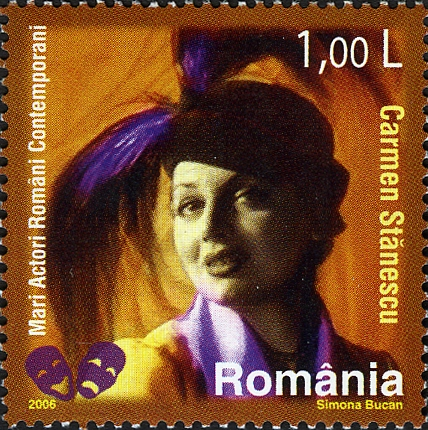
Carmen Stănescu

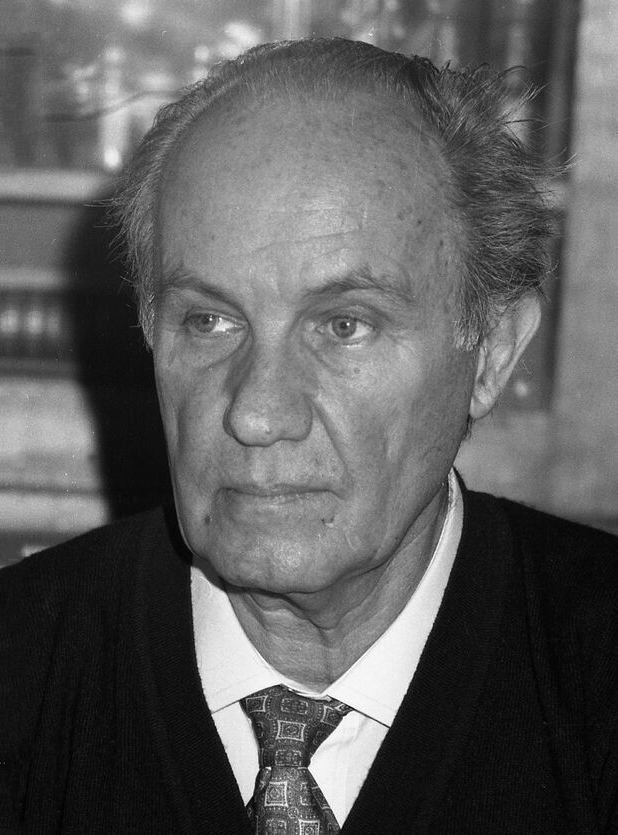
Dinu C. Giurescu

- 1 April – Justin Andrei, 84, engineering geologist and geophysicist (b. 1934)
- 6 April – Șerban Papacostea, 89, historian (b. 1928)
- 11 April – Carmen Stănescu, 92, stage and film actress
- 14 April – Mihai Stănescu, 78, caricaturist (b. 1939)
- 15 April – Nicolae Mischie, 73, politician (b. 1945)
- 16 April –
  - Florea Dumitrescu, 91, economist, finance minister (1969–78), ambassador of Romania to China (1978–83) and governor of the National Bank (1984–89)
  - Nicolae Mischie, 72, politician
  - Ionela Prodan, 70, folk music singer (b. 1947)
- 24 April – Dinu C. Giurescu, 91, historian and politician

=== May ===
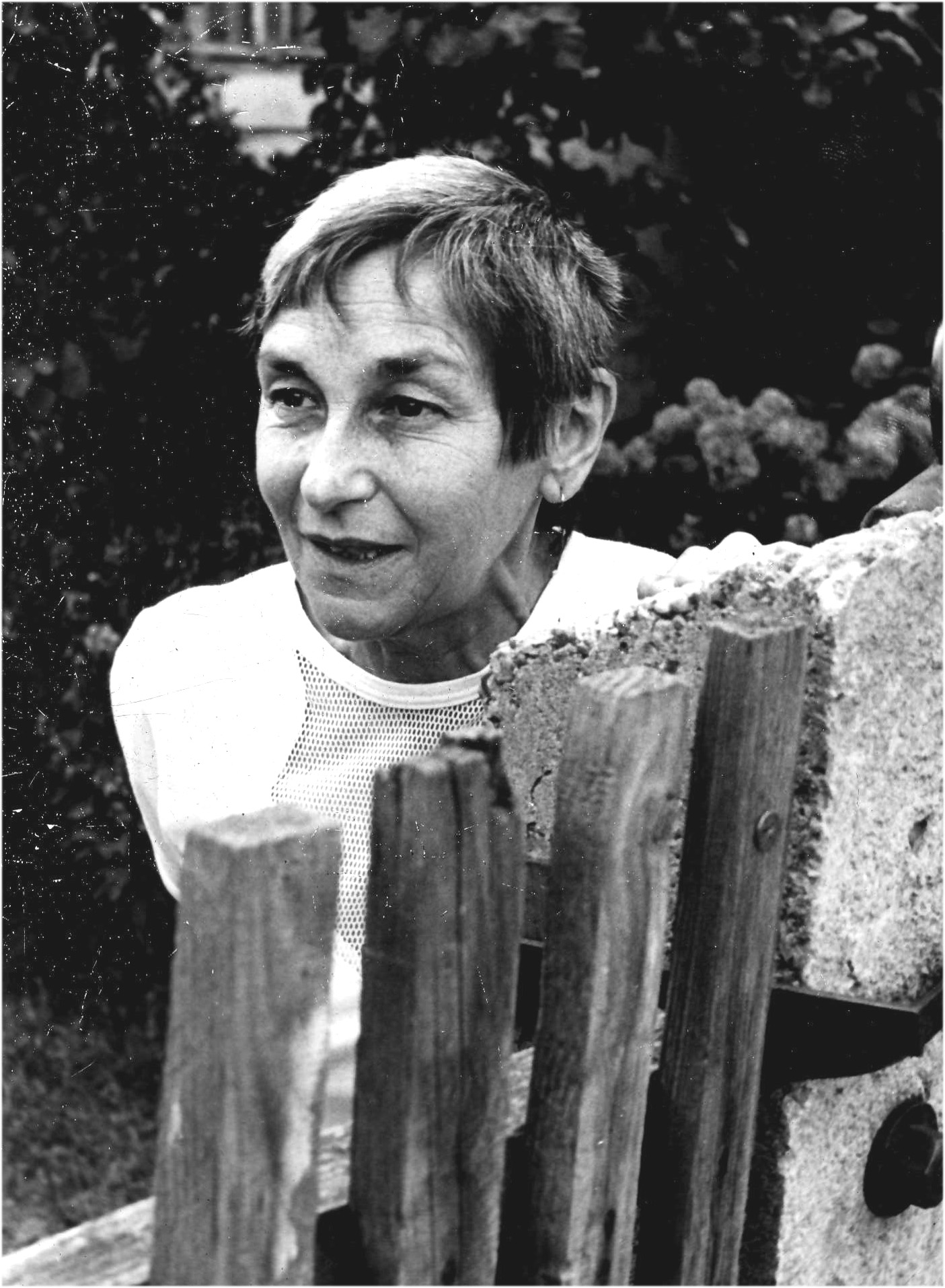
Doina Cornea

- 1 May – Constantin Olteanu, 89, general, Minister of National Defense (1980–1985) and Mayor of Bucharest (1985–1988) (b. 1928)
- 3 May – Doina Cornea, 88, Romanian human rights activist and professor.
- 15 May – Cristian Țopescu, 81, sports commentator, journalist and politician (b. 1937)
- 16 May –
  - François Bréda, 62, Romanian writer and literary critic.
  - Lucian Pintilie, 84, Romanian film director.
- 21 May – Mircea Malița, 91, academician, diplomat, mathematician, professor, and essayist (b. 1927)
- 22 May – Cabiria Andreian Cazacu, 90, mathematician and honorary member of the Romanian Academy.
- 25 May – Hildegard Puwak, 68, Romanian politician, Minister of European Integration (2000–2003).

=== June ===
- 3 June – Alexandru Jula, 83, singer (b. 1934)
- 5 June – Karl Fritz Lauer, 80, Romanian-German scientist.
- 6 June – H. H. Wieder, 99, Romanian-born American physicist.
- 11 June – Maria Butaciu, 78, folk music singer (b. 1940)
- 20 June – Sándor Kányádi, 89, poet (b. 1929)
- 21 June –
  - Horaţiu Nicolau, 84, Romanian Olympic volleyball player.
  - Gernot Nussbächer, 78, historian, archivist and writer (b. 1939)
- 26 June – Joseph Seroussi, 85, Sudanese-born Romanian fashion designer.

=== August ===
- 2 August – Mihai Radu Pricop, 68, politician (b. 1950)
- 7 August – Dumitru Fărcaș, 80, taragot player (b. 1938)
- 19 August – Margareta Niculescu, 92, puppeteer, director, and teacher (b. 1926)

=== September ===
- 19 September – Geta Brătescu, 92, visual artist (b. 1926)

=== October ===
- 13 October – Georgeta Pitică, 88, table tennis player, world champion (b. 1930)
- 21 October – Ilie Balaci, 62, footballer (b. 1956)

=== November ===
- 22 November – Nicolae Mihalcea, 96, Romanian Olympic equestrian (1952, 1956).
- 23 November – Bujor Hălmăgeanu, 77, Romanian football player (Steaua București, national team) and manager (Dacia Unirea Brăila), respiratory failure.
- 25 November – Randolph L. Braham, 95, Romanian-born American historian and political scientist.

=== December ===
- 16 December –
  - Mircea Petescu, 76, Romanian football player (Steaua București, UTA Arad) and manager (Sparta Rotterdam), Alzheimer's disease.
  - Anca Pop, 34, Romanian-Canadian singer-songwriter, traffic collision.

== See also ==
- 2018 unification declarations in Moldova and Romania
- 2018 in the European Union
- 2018 in Europe
- Romania in the Eurovision Song Contest 2018
- Romania at the 2018 Winter Olympics
- Romania at the 2018 Winter Paralympics
- Romania at the 2018 Summer Youth Olympics
