= Laura Benson =

British actress

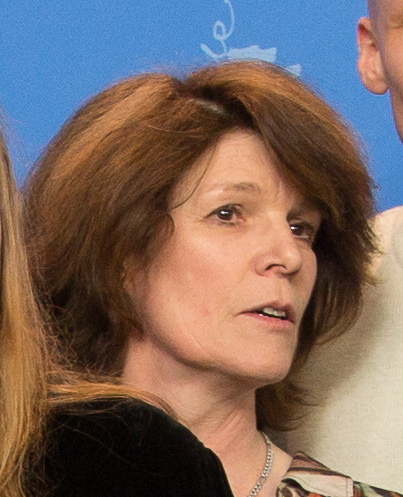
- Laura Benson in 2018
- Occupation: Actress

Laura Benson is a British actress based in Paris, France.

== Career ==
Benson has been based in Paris since 1981. She was trained at the École des comédiens by Théâtre Nanterre-Amandiers (directed by Patrice Chéreau and Pierre Romans), Laura Benson made her debut in 1986 both in cinema (Hôtel de France) and on stage (Platonov) with Patrice Chéreau. Around twenty shows saw her work under the direction of Luc Bondy, Pierre Romans, Didier Goldschmidt, Irina Brook, Nathalie Bensard (her performance in George, a play she co-wrote and produced, earned her a nomination for the Molières in the "revelation" category) and Habib Naghmouchin in Timon of Athens, an adaptation of William Shakespeare's play staged in December 2006 at the Théâtre de la Boutonnière in Paris, with Denis Lavant.

In cinema, Laura Benson played in "Hotel de France" by Patrice Chéreau and L'Amoureuse by Jacques Doillon in 1987 and, the following year, in Dangerous Liaisons by Stephen Frears. Then she was directed by Alain Resnais in I Want to Go Home (1990), Robert Altman (Prêt-à-porter, 1994). In the 2010s she appeared in films such as Les Profs 2, Knock and in Touch Me Not, the first feature film by the Romanian filmmaker Adina Pintilie, Ours d'Or at the 68th Berlin International Film Festival, in which she played the main role.

== Filmography ==
=== Films ===
- 1987 : Hôtel de France by Patrice Chéreau : Anna
- 1987 : L'Amoureuse by Jacques Doillon : Laurence
- 1988 : Les Liaisons dangereuses (Dangerous Liaisons) by Stephen Frears : Émilie
- 1989 : I Want to Go Home by Alain Resnais : Elsie Wellman
- 1991 : Amelia Lopes O'Neill by Valeria Sarmiento : Anna
- 1994 : Prêt-à-porter by Robert Altman : A Close Friend of Milo
- 2004 : L'Américain by Patrick Timsit : Geena
- 2008 : Le Crime est notre affaire by Pascal Thomas : Margaret Brown
- 2015 : Les Profs 2 by Pierre-François Martin-Laval : Miss Johns
- 2017 : Knock by Lorraine Lévy : the English passenger
- 2018 : Touch Me Not by Adina Pintilie : Laura
- 2021 : Spencer by Pablo Larraín : Angela
- 2021 : Lipstick on the Glass by Kuba Czekaj : Mary
- 2022 : Le Tigre et le Président by Jean-Marc Peyrefitte
- 2024 : Little Jaffna by Lawrence Valin: DGSI Responsible

=== Television ===
- 1988 : Cinéma 16 - TV film L'Amoureuse by Jacques Doillon : Laurence
- 1989 : Le Conte d'hiver, directed by Luc Bondy, filmed by Pierre Cavassilas : Perdita
- 1991 : Un drôle de contrat by Carol Wiseman : Hélène
- 1995 : Les Louves by Jean-Marc Seban (TV film) : Fred
- 2001 : Sydney Fox, l'aventurière, season 2, episode 19 The Executioner's Mask by Paolo Barzman : main character
- 2001 : Police District, season 2, episode 6 Double identity of Manuel Boursinhac (TV series)
- 2022 : Marie-Antoinette by Pete Travis and Geoffrey Enthoven : Madame de Noailles
