= Pricop =

Pricop is a surname. Notable people with this surname include:

- Mihai Radu Pricop (1950–2018), Romanian senator
- Mitică Pricop (born 1977), Romanian sprint canoer
