= Alfred Reynolds =

Alfred Reynolds is the name of:

- Alfred Reynolds (composer) (1884–1969), British composer of light music
- Alfred Reynolds (politician) (1894–1976), Australian politician
- Alfred Reynolds (writer) (1907–1993), Hungarian-British writer on social and religious topics
