= Omission =

Omission may refer to:

- Sin of omission, a sin committed by willingly not performing a certain action
- Omission (law), a failure to act, with legal consequences
- Omission bias, a tendency to favor inaction over action
- Purposeful omission, a literary method
- Theory of omission, a writing technique
- The Omission, a 2018 Argentine film
- Selective omission, an effort to forget traumatic memories
- Lying by omission
