= Christian Palustran =

French playwright and storyteller (born 1947)

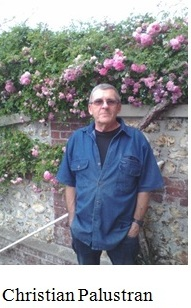
- Born: 1947 (age 78–79); Saint-Cloud, Paris, France

Christian Palustran (born 1947, Saint-Cloud) is a French playwright and storyteller.

== Biography ==
Christian Palustran was born in 1947 in Saint-Cloud. After completing his graduate studies at the Sorbonne University, he was appointed professor in Normandy. He puts on shows with his students and leads writing workshops from elementary school to university. At the same time, he launches himself into the creation of texts and two of his first works, Escapade and Story of an egg are awarded and staged at the National One Act Competition in Metz (France).

Christian Palustran has written some thirty plays of various genres. Many have been performed in France and in French-speaking countries. In Paris and in other regions: North of France (Lille, National Dramatic Center for Youth), Provence (National Avignon festiva) etc.

Likewise, in Switzerland, in Canada and in Belgium. In the latter country, A Yellow Butterfly Called Sphinx and The Misdeeds of Bourbon (Les Méfaits du Bourbon) represented France at the international CIFTA Estivades (International Amateur Theater Association Festival) in Marche-en-Famenne and La Chausse-trape (The Trap), at the first Namur International Festival.

Some of his plays were broadcast on the airwaves Radio Suisse Romande and National cultural radio France-Culture.

Several of his plays have been translated into different languages and have been performed abroad: in the USA (in New York where Escapade won a first prize), in Argentina but also in Great Britain , in Spainand in Eastern Europe (Russia, Bulgaria and Romania: A Yellow Butterfly Called Sphinx, translation by Nicolae Weisz. and Abyss, translation by François Bréda and Radu Teampău).

Among them, we can cite many satirical comedies in which he derides our time. He is also the author of tragic monologues and social dramas.

Palustran is interested in theater for young people. With false naivety or more directly, his works tackle contemporary problems, sometimes at the risk of surprising or disturbing (A Yellow Butterfly Called Sphinx).

Keen on languages, he sometimes translates other authors or contributes to the translation of his texts. He also supports the Francophonie, the organization of countries with French as an official or important language. From 2009 to 2019, he has annually chaired the Francophone Festival La Première in Kirov, Russia.

Palustran is also the author of several collections of tales: Le Crépuscule des fées (The Good People's Twilight), Les Contes du croissant de lune (The Tales of the Crescent Moon), and Métamorphoses, mon amour (Metamorphoses, My Love), a contemporary treatment of Ovid. Drawing inspiration from famous tales, these "strands of dreams", as the author calls them, often underline, ironically or facetiously, the flaws specific to our time. They were broadcast on various radio stations and were also said in public, at the National Festival of Storytellers of Chevilly-la-Rue near Paris and in various towns. They had for performers famous French actresses (Judith Magre) and actors (Michel Bouquet, François Périer, Claude Piéplu...).).

== Works ==
=== Theatre ===
(For summaries, number of actors, places and dates of creation, see the list of plays in SACD Authors' Repertoire).

==== For all audiences ====
- Escapade (Escapade): first-place winner at the International Playwrighting Competition, 1998, New-York City, 13th street Repertory Company. Translated by Frank Moorman. L'Avant-scène Théâtre n° 735/736, (FRBNF39768555)
- A Yellow Butterfly called Sphinx (Un papillon jaune appelé sphinx): performed in New-York City at the International Fringe Festival, 2002 and by the 13th street Repertory Company, July 2006. Translated into English by Pauline Patman, La Fontaine, 1990 and 2002, Trilingual version, French, English, Italian (ISBN 2-907846-64-7). Also translated into Romanian.
- Dogdaze (La Canicule): Reading/stage, New-York City, 13th Street Repertory Company, August 2006. Translation by Frank Moorman. La Fontaine, 1991 and 2002 (ISBN 2-907846-62-0).
- The diary of a were-wolf, Abyss and Cloud (Journal d'un loup-garou, Abîmes et Nuage): Lansman, 1996, (ISBN 2-87282-155-4). Translation into English of The diary of a were-wolf by Frank Moorman. and of Abyss into Rumanian by François Bréda Broadcast of Diary of a werewolf on Radio France-Culture (1991) and of Cloud on the Swiss Romande Radio (1990).
- Une Soirée tranquille, La Fontaine,1996, (ISBN 2-907846-26-4).
- Le Grand Débat (taken from Un Paradis d'enfer): translated into Bulgarian by A. Sougarev, Review Panorama n° 3, Le Théâtre français cotemporain (French contemporary theater), 1998.
- Citizen BV ou La Barbe Verte, Art & Comédie, 2001, (ISBN 2-84422-201-3).
- Le Paysan, le Roi et la Marmite, La Fontaine, 1992 and 2002, (ISBN 2-907846-17-5).
- Queneau, que si, collective work, Les Quatre Vents, 2003, (ISBN 2-7498-0903-7).
- La Chausse-trape, La Fontaine, 1998 and 2004, (ISBN 2-907846-31-0).
- Les Méfaits du Bourbon, La Fontaine, 2004, (ISBN 2-907846-78-7).
- Un paradis d'enfer, with Théophraste ou le huitième ciel, Linda and L'Épreuve in Théâtre pour appartements et petites scènes, Les Mandarines, 2006, (ISBN 2-9516482-7-8).
- Ecco in Un autre regard, L'Agapante, 2008, (ISBN 978-2-9526097-1-5).
- La Fontaine, le clown et les écolos, balade théâtrale, La Fontaine, 2010, (ISBN 978-2-35361-029-7).
- Les Télecrates, new edition (L'épreuve et Des Pâtes à la vinaigrette), ABS, 2001, (ISBN 978-2-915839-76-0).
- Mythomania, balade théâtrale, with Histoire d'oeuf (Story of an Egg) and Vente à domicile, Les Mandarines, 2020, (ISBN 978-2-491921-00-2).

==== For children and young adolescents ====
- Story of an egg (Histoire d'oeuf), 1991 and 2020 (new edition), Les Mandarines, (ISBN 978-2-491921-00-2). Translated into English by Frank Moorman and into Russian by Marina Kokorina.
- The Cat's tale (La Queue du chat): a diptych with The Hood Case in Démocratie mosaique 4, Lansman, 2000, (ISBN 2-87282-276-3). Translated into English by Peggy Josset-Ralph and into Spanish by Alejandro Finzi.
- The Hood case (L'Affaire Chaperon): a diptych with The Cat's tail) in Démocratie Mosaïque 3, 1998, and in Petites Pièces pour dire le monde, Lansman, 2005, (ISBN 2-87282-494-4). Translated into English by Peggy Josset-Ralph, into Spanish by Alejandro Finzi and into Russian by Marina Kokorina.
- Théâtre de Noël (Christmas Theater): The Surprise of Santa Claus, Story of the Star and the Ark, The War of the Trees, The Magician, Les Mandarines, 2004, (ISBN 2-9516482-5-1). Translated into Russian by Marina Kokorina and Sergei Khaletskiy.
- La Reine et l'Olifant magique (The Queen and the magic olifant) followed by Peau d'Âne 2000 (Donkey Skin 2000) and Concerto pour Lutin, Spectre et Ondine (Concerto for goblin, ghost and mermaid), La Fontaine, 2005, (ISBN 2-907846-88-4).
- La Soeur de Blanche-Neige (Snow White's sister), Art & Comédie, 2006, (ISBN 2-9516482-5-1).

==== Author's translations ====
- A Christmas Carol: French translation of the play by Sandra Nordgren, theatrical adaptation of the Charles Dickens tale, Art & Comédie, 2000 (ISBN 2-84422-170-X).
- The Secret of Deer Island and The Mischievous Child (theatrical adaptation of Hans Christian Andersen's tale) by Argentinian playwright Alejandro Finzi.

=== Stories ===
==== Radio-France cassettes ====
- La Surprise du Père Noël (The Surprise of Santa Claus), 1987: printed in 10,000 copies for the operation "We are all Santa Claus" launched by France-Culture, France-Inter, and the magazine Pèlerin.
- Le Crépuscule des fées (The Twilight of the Fairies), 1993.

==== France-Culture and Radio Suisse Romande recordings ====
- La Dame de glace, La Nouvelle Peau d'Âne, Le Procès du Petit Chaperon rouge (The Ice Lady, The New Donkey Skin, The Trial of Little Red Riding Hood).These three tales were also broadcast on Canadian Radio.
- La Surprise du Père Noël and Le Paysan, le Roi et la Marmite (The Surprise of Santa Claus and The Peasant, the King and the Pot), 4 episodes.
- Le Destin des arbres, Le Chat buté, Histoire de l'étoile de Noël, L'Ovni - 2 episodes; Concerto pour Lutin, Spectre et Ondine – 3 episodes (The Fate of the Trees, The Stubborn Cat, The Story of the Christmas Star, The UFO; Concerto for Goblin, Ghost and Mermaid), 1980, 1982 and 1984.

==== Publications ====
- Les Contes du croissant de lune (Tales of the Crescent Moon), Art & Comédie, 2000 (ISBN 2-84422-169-6).
- Concerto pour lutin, spectre et ondine (Concerto for Goblin, Ghost and Mermaid) in the review L'Encre et l'Oeuvre n° 206–207, Souffles, 2004.
- Métamorphoses, mon amour (Metamorphoses, My Love), after Ovid, Hachette jeunesse, 2005. This book is also transcribed in Braille (GIAA PACA / CORSE).

== Bibliography ==
- Répertoire du théâtre contemporain de langue française (Directory of Contemporary French-Language Theater) by Claude Confortès, Nathan, October 2000 (ISBN 2-09-190192-X).
- BĂRBUȚĂ, Margareta (1997-10-11) Cursa de vulpi (The Trap) by Christian Palustran, translation Gabriela Jiroș, Ploiești, Toma Caragiu Theater: "Viața în umbra televizorului" (Life in the shadow of television). Review Teatrul Azi (The theater today) – via Biblioteca digitala.
- Le théâtre jeune public, un nouveau répertoire (Theater for Young Audiences: A New Repertoire) by Nicolas Faure, Presses Universitaires de Rennes, 2009.
- Muresan, Olimpia (December 2020). TEATRUL CETĂȚII – ANTOLOGIE DE TEXTE. Stirile MM.
