= I Want to Go Home (1989 film) =

- Theatrical release poster
- Directed by: Alain Resnais
- Written by: Jules Feiffer
- Produced by: Marin Karmitz
- Starring: Adolph Green; Gérard Depardieu; Micheline Presle; Linda Lavin; Laura Benson
- Cinematography: Charles Van Damme
- Edited by: Albert Jurgenson
- Music by: John Kander
- Distributed by: MK2 Diffusion
- Release date: 27 September 1989 (France)
- Running time: 100 minutes
- Country: France
- Languages: English and French

I Want to Go Home is a 1989 French comedy film directed by Alain Resnais, from a screenplay by Jules Feiffer. It explores the differences between French and American cultural values through a story about a veteran cartoonist who encounters conflicting reactions to his work during a trip abroad.

== Plot ==
Joey Wellman, an American cartoonist from Cleveland now largely forgotten at home, visits France with his partner Lena to attend an exhibition in Paris about the comic strip (bande dessinée) which features his work. He also hopes to be reconciled with his daughter Elsie who has been a student in Paris for two years, in flight from the American culture of which she sees her father as a typical example. Elsie is naively infatuated with French literature, and is trying to secure an introduction to the brilliant university professor Christian Gauthier, an expert on Flaubert but also an enthusiast for comic books. The meeting of father and daughter goes badly, but Elsie is persuaded to join Joey and Lena for the weekend at the country house of Gauthier's mother, Isabelle. During a comic-themed masquerade party, all of the characters are made to reconsider their present and past relationships.

== Cast ==
- Adolph Green, as Joey Wellman
- Gérard Depardieu, as Christian Gauthier
- Micheline Presle, as Isabelle Gauthier, Christian's mother
- Linda Lavin, as Lena Apthrop, Joey's partner
- Laura Benson, as Elsie Wellman, Joey's daughter
- John Ashton, as Harry Dempsey, an American film director in exile
- Caroline Silhol as Dora Dempsey
- Geraldine Chaplin, as Terry Armstrong
- Françoise Bertin, as The greengrocer's client

== Production ==
The project initially arose from Resnais's admiration for the plays of the American writer and illustrator Jules Feiffer. Although there was originally no intention of highlighting the comic-strip, Feiffer suggested using the character of a comic illustrator as the means of exploring American and French attitudes towards the appreciation of cartoons and comic-books. This appealed to Resnais's own longstanding enthusiasm for comic-strips, and allowed him to develop a film that was dense with references to cartoon characters and their creators. (Animated characters often appear within the frame to converse with one of the live-actors.) Resnais was also fascinated by the question of whether people could appreciate comics on the same level as a literary work such as one by Flaubert.

Another source of reference was American musical comedy, underlined by the casting in the central role of Adolph Green, writer of classic musicals such as On the Town, Singin' in the Rain, and The Band Wagon, and by the choice of John Kander, composer of Cabaret and Chicago, to provide the musical score.

The film was made predominantly in English. A dubbed French version was subsequently created (without Resnais's participation).

== Reception ==
On its release the film met with a largely hostile reception from both critics and the public in France. Resnais attributed the film's failure to the unfamiliarity of the public with the world of the comic-strip and its personalities, which made it difficult to appreciate the confrontation of values which the film explored.

The film failed to get distribution either in the United States or in Great Britain. Variety described it as a "stillborn satiric comedy".

The producer of the film, Marin Karmitz, registered a substantial financial loss from the film's commercial flop, and was unable to engage in further production work for the next 18 months. He nevertheless continued to declare his support for what he regarded as one of Resnais's most important films, describing it as "a great film about death, and about the death of certain cultures".

I Want to Go Home was shown at the 1989 Venice Film Festival, where it won awards for Alain Resnais and Jules Feiffer.

The appearance of the film on DVD two decades after its original release led to some more sympathetic assessments, and recognition of its "blatantly nutty" humour.
