= Jibril (film) =

2018 film

- Film poster
- Directed by: Henrika Kull
- Written by: Henrika Kull
- Starring: Susana AbdulMajid; Malik Blumenthal
- Release date: 16 February 2018 (Berlin)
- Running time: 83 minutes
- Country: Germany
- Language: German

Jibril is a 2018 German drama film directed by Henrika Kull. It was screened in the Panorama section at the 68th Berlin International Film Festival.

== Cast ==
- Susana AbdulMajid as Maryam
- Malik Blumenthal as Jibril (as Malik Adan)
