= Horizon (2018 film) =

2018 film

- Film poster
- Directed by: Tinatin Kajrishvili
- Written by: Tinatin Kajrishvili
- Starring: Giorgi Bochorishvili
- Release date: 16 February 2018 (Berlin)
- Running time: 105 minutes
- Country: Georgia
- Language: Georgian

Horizon (Georgian: Horizonti) is a 2018 Georgian drama film directed by Tinatin Kajrishvili. It was screened in the Panorama section at the 68th Berlin International Film Festival.

== Cast ==
- Giorgi Bochorishvili as Giorgi
- Ia Sukhitashvili as Ana
- Jano Izoria as Jano
- Ioseb Gogichaishvili as Valiko
- Lili Okroshidze as Marika
