= Dangerous Liaisons =

1988 film by Stephen Frears

- Theatrical release poster
- Directed by: Stephen Frears
- Screenplay by: Christopher Hampton
- Based on: Les Liaisons dangereuses 1782 epistolary novel by Pierre Choderlos de Laclos and Les liaisons dangereuses 1985 play by Christopher Hampton
- Produced by: Norma Heyman; Hank Moonjean
- Starring: Glenn Close; John Malkovich; Michelle Pfeiffer; Swoosie Kurtz; Keanu Reeves; Mildred Natwick; Uma Thurman
- Cinematography: Philippe Rousselot
- Edited by: Mick Audsley
- Music by: George Fenton
- Production companies: Lorimar Film Entertainment; NFH Limited
- Distributed by: Warner Bros.
- Release date: December 21, 1988 (United States)
- Running time: 119 minutes
- Country: United States
- Language: English
- Budget: $14 million
- Box office: $34.7 million

Dangerous Liaisons is a 1988 American period romantic drama film directed by Stephen Frears, from a screenplay by Christopher Hampton based on his 1985 play Les Liaisons Dangereuses, itself adapted from the 1782 French novel by Pierre Choderlos de Laclos. The film depicts schemes of seduction and revenge among aristocrats in 18th century France, and stars Glenn Close, John Malkovich, Michelle Pfeiffer, Uma Thurman, Swoosie Kurtz, Mildred Natwick, Peter Capaldi and Keanu Reeves.

Dangerous Liaisons was theatrically released by Warner Bros. on December 21, 1988. Grossing $34.7 million against its $14 million budget, the film was a modest box-office success. It was nominated for seven awards at the 61st Academy Awards, including Best Picture, winning three: Best Adapted Screenplay, Best Costume Design, and Best Production Design.

== Plot ==
In pre-Revolution Paris, the Marquise de Merteuil plots revenge against her ex-lover, the Comte de Bastide, who recently ended their relationship. To soothe her wounded pride and embarrass Bastide, she seeks to arrange the seduction and disgrace of his young virgin fiancée, Cécile de Volanges, who has only recently been presented to society after spending her formative years in the shelter of a convent.

Merteuil calls on the similarly unprincipled Vicomte de Valmont, another ex-lover of hers, to do the deed. Valmont declines as he is plotting to seduce Madame de Tourvel, the devoutly religious wife of a member of Parliament and a guest of Valmont's aunt, Madame de Rosemonde. Amused and incredulous at Valmont's hubris, Merteuil ups the ante: if Valmont seduces Tourvel and can furnish written proof, Merteuil will sleep with him as well. Never one to refuse a challenge, Valmont accepts.

Tourvel rebuffs all of Valmont's advances. He instructs his page Azolan to seduce Tourvel's maid, Julie, and gain access to Tourvel's private correspondence. One of the letters intercepted is from Cécile's mother and Merteuil's cousin, Madame de Volanges, warning Tourvel that Valmont is nefarious and untrustworthy. Valmont resolves to seduce Cécile as revenge for her mother's accurate denunciation of him.

At the opera, Cécile meets the charming and handsome Chevalier Danceny, who becomes her music teacher. They fall in love, with coaxing from Merteuil, who knows that Danceny, as a nobleman of lesser rank, naïve, young, and not particularly wealthy, can never be accepted as a suitor.

Valmont gains access to Cécile's bedchamber on a pretext and sexually assaults her. As she pleads with him to leave, he blackmails her into giving up physical resistance and the scene ends. On the pretext of illness, Cécile remains locked in her chambers, refusing all visitors. A concerned Madame de Volanges asks Merteuil to speak to Cécile, who confides in Merteuil, naïvely assuming that she has Cécile's best interests at heart. Merteuil advises Cécile to welcome Valmont's advances; she says young women should take advantage of all the lovers they can acquire in a society so repressive and contemptuous of women. The result is a "student-teacher" relationship; by day, Cécile is courted by Danceny and each night, she receives a sexual "lesson" from Valmont. Merteuil begins an affair with Danceny.

After a night in Valmont's bed, Cécile suffers a miscarriage. Valmont has won Tourvel's heart but at a price, the lifelong bachelor playboy falls in love. In a fit of jealousy, Merteuil mocks Valmont and refuses to honor her agreement unless Valmont breaks up with Tourvel. Valmont abruptly dismisses Tourvel with a terse excuse, suggested by Merteuil, "It's beyond my control". Overwhelmed with grief and shame, Tourvel retreats to a monastery where her health deteriorates rapidly.

Despite the breakup, Merteuil still refuses to honor the agreement and provoked by Valmont, declares "war". She informs Danceny that Valmont has been sleeping with Cécile. Danceny challenges Valmont to a duel, ending with the latter voluntarily running into Danceny's sword. With his dying breath, Valmont asks Danceny to communicate to Tourvel his true feelings for her; he warns Danceny about Meurteuil and gives him his collection of intimate letters from her as proof. Valmont tells Danceny to circulate them after he has read them.

After hearing Valmont's message from Danceny, Tourvel dies. Merteuil sinks into madness and pain. Later, she attends a show at the opera but leaves after being booed by her former friends and sycophants, implying that all of Paris has learned the full range of her schemes and depredations due to Danceny's circulation of the letters.

== Cast ==
- Glenn Close as Marquise de Merteuil
- John Malkovich as Vicomte de Valmont
- Michelle Pfeiffer as Madame de Tourvel
- Swoosie Kurtz as Madame de Volanges, mother of Cécile and cousin to Merteuil
- Keanu Reeves as Chevalier Danceny, suitor to Cécile
- Mildred Natwick as Madame de Rosemonde, Valmont's aunt
- Uma Thurman as Cécile de Volanges
- Peter Capaldi as Azolan, Valmont's valet
- Joe Sheridan as Georges, Madame de Tourvel's footman
- Valerie Gogan as Julie, Madame de Tourvel's chambermaid
- Laura Benson as Émilie, a courtesan
- Joanna Pavlis as Adèle, Madame de Rosemonde's maid
- François Montagut as Belleroche, Merteuil's lover
- Harry Jones as Armand

== Production ==
Dangerous Liaisons was the first English-language film adaptation of Laclos's novel. The screenplay was based on Christopher Hampton's Olivier Award-winning and Tony Award-nominated theatrical adaptation for the Royal Shakespeare Company, directed by Howard Davies with Lindsay Duncan, Alan Rickman and Juliet Stevenson.

The film was shot on location in the Île-de-France of northern France, in historical buildings such as the Château de Vincennes in Val-de-Marne, the Château de Champs-sur-Marne, the Château de Guermantes in Seine-et-Marne, the Château du Saussay in Essonne and the Théâtre Montansier in Versailles.

Liaisons was the final film appearance of Academy Award and Tony Award-nominated actress Mildred Natwick. Drew Barrymore and Sarah Jessica Parker were considered for the role of Cécile before it went to Thurman. Annette Bening went through several auditions for the role of the courtesan Émilie but in the end the role went to Laura Benson. Bening would go on to play the role of the Marquise de Merteuil in Miloš Forman's adaptation of Les Liaisons Dangereuses, Valmont, a year later.

During production, Malkovich had an affair with Pfeiffer. His six-year marriage to actress Glenne Headly ended shortly thereafter.

Thurman later stated that she agreed to perform a nude scene in the film because she believed it was the right artistic decision at the time, despite feeling nervous. She expressed dissatisfaction with the "voyeuristic" nature of the final cut of the scene and decided not to appear nude again in films.

== Soundtrack ==
The score of Dangerous Liaisons was written by the British film music composer George Fenton. The soundtrack also includes works by a number of baroque and classical composers, reflecting the story's 18th-Century-French setting; pieces by Antonio Vivaldi, Johann Sebastian Bach, George Frideric Handel and Christoph Willibald Gluck feature prominently, although no French composers are included.

Track	Song title	Composer
1	Dangerous Liaisons Main Title/"Dressing" - La cetra, Op. 9, Concerto No. 9	Antonio Vivaldi, arr. George Fenton
2	"Madame De Tourvel"	George Fenton
3	"The Challenge"	George Fenton
4	"O malheureuse Iphigénie!", from Iphigénie en Tauride	Christoph Willibald Gluck
5	"Going Hunting" – "Allegro" from Organ Concerto No. 13, "The Cuckoo and the Nightingale"	George Frideric Handel, arr. George Fenton
6	"Valmont's First Move"/"The Staircase" - La cetra, Op. 9, Concerto No. 9	Antonio Vivaldi/George Fenton
7	"Beneath The Surface"	George Fenton
8	"The Set Up"	George Fenton
9	"The Key"	George Fenton
10	"Her Eyes Are Closing"	George Fenton
11	"Ombra mai fu", from Serse	George Frideric Handel
12	"Tourvel's Flight"	George Fenton
13	"Success"	George Fenton
14	"Emilie"	George Fenton
15	"Beyond My Control"	George Fenton
16	"A Final Request"	George Fenton
17	"Ombra mai fu" reprise/"The Mirror"	George Frideric Handel/George Fenton
18	Dangerous Liaisons End Credits	George Fenton
19	"Allegro" from Concerto in A minor for four harpsichords, BWV 1065	Johann Sebastian Bach

== Reception ==
=== Critical response ===
Dangerous Liaisons holds a score of 91% on Rotten Tomatoes based on 35 reviews. The site's consensus states: "Stylish, seductive, and clever, Stephen Frears' adaptation is a wickedly entertaining exploration of sexual politics." On Metacritic it has a score of 74 based on 17 reviews, indicating "generally favorable" reviews. Audiences surveyed by CinemaScore gave the film a grade B+ on scale of A to F.

Pauline Kael in The New Yorker described it as "heaven – alive in a way that movies rarely are." Hal Hinson in The Washington Post wrote that the film's "wit and immediacy is extraordinarily rare in a period film. Instead of making the action seem far off, the filmmakers put the audience in the room with their characters." Roger Ebert called it "an absorbing and seductive movie, but not compelling." Variety considered it an "incisive study of sex as an arena for manipulative power games." Vincent Canby in The New York Times hailed it as a "kind of lethal drawing-room comedy."

The Time Out reviewer wrote of Christopher Hampton's screenplay that "one of the film's enormous strengths is scriptwriter Christopher Hampton's decision to go back to the novel, and save only the best from his play". James Acheson and Stuart Craig were also praised for their work, with Sheila Benson of the Los Angeles Times stating that "the film's details of costuming (by The Last Emperor's James Acheson) and production design (by Stuart Craig of Gandhi and The Mission) are ravishing". All three would go on to win Academy Awards for their work on this film.

Glenn Close received considerable praise for her performance; she was lauded by The New York Times for her "richness and comic delicacy," while Mick LaSalle of the San Francisco Chronicle wrote that, once she "finally lets loose and gives way to complete animal despair, Close is horrifying." Roger Ebert thought the two lead roles were "played to perfection by Close and Malkovich... their arch dialogues together turn into exhausting conversational games, tennis matches of the soul."

Michelle Pfeiffer was widely acclaimed for her portrayal, despite playing, in the opinion of The Washington Post, "the least obvious and the most difficult" role. "Nothing is harder to play than virtue, and Pfeiffer is smart enough not to try. Instead, she embodies it." The New York Times called her performance a "happy surprise." Roger Ebert, considering the trajectory of her career, wrote that "in a year that has seen her in varied assignments such as Married to the Mob and Tequila Sunrise, the movie is more evidence of her versatility. She is good when she is innocent and superb when she is guilty." Pfeiffer would go on to win the BAFTA Award for Best Actress in a Supporting Role for her performance.

The casting of John Malkovich proved to be a controversial decision that divided critics. The New York Times, while admitting there was the "shock of seeing him in powdered wigs", concluded that he was "unexpectedly fine. The intelligence and strength of the actor shape the audience's response to him". The Washington Post was similarly impressed with Malkovich's performance: "There's a sublime perversity in Frears' casting, especially that of Malkovich... [he] brings a fascinating dimension to his character that would be missing with a more conventionally handsome leading man." Variety was less impressed, stating that while the "sly actor conveys the character's snaky, premeditated Don Juanism... he lacks the devilish charm and seductiveness one senses Valmont would need to carry off all his conquests".

Uma Thurman gained recognition from critics and audiences; film critic Roger Ebert found her to be "well cast" in her "tricky" key role.

=== Accolades ===
Award	Category	Nominee(s)	Result	Ref.
Academy Awards	Best Picture	Norma Heyman and Hank Moonjean	Nominated	
Academy Awards	Best Actress	Glenn Close	Nominated	
Academy Awards	Best Supporting Actress	Michelle Pfeiffer	Nominated	
Academy Awards	Best Screenplay – Based on Material from Another Medium	Christopher Hampton	Won	
Academy Awards	Best Art Direction	Art Direction: Stuart Craig; Set Decoration: Gérard James	Won	
Academy Awards	Best Costume Design	James Acheson	Won	
Academy Awards	Best Original Score	George Fenton	Nominated	
American Society of Cinematographers Awards	Outstanding Achievement in Cinematography in Theatrical Releases	Philippe Rousselot	Nominated	
Bodil Awards	Best Non-European Film	Stephen Frears	Won	
Boston Society of Film Critics Awards	Best Director	Stephen Frears	Won	
British Academy Film Awards	Best Direction	Stephen Frears	Nominated	
British Academy Film Awards	Best Actress in a Leading Role	Glenn Close	Nominated	
British Academy Film Awards	Best Actress in a Supporting Role	Michelle Pfeiffer	Won	
British Academy Film Awards	Best Adapted Screenplay	Christopher Hampton	Won	
British Academy Film Awards	Best Cinematography	Philippe Rousselot	Nominated	
British Academy Film Awards	Best Costume Design	James Acheson	Nominated	
British Academy Film Awards	Best Editing	Mick Audsley	Nominated	
British Academy Film Awards	Best Make-Up Artist	Jean-Luc Russier	Nominated	
British Academy Film Awards	Best Original Film Score	George Fenton	Nominated	
British Academy Film Awards	Best Production Design	Stuart Craig	Nominated	
British Society of Cinematographers Awards	Best Cinematography in a Theatrical Feature Film	Philippe Rousselot	Nominated	
César Awards	Best Foreign Film	Stephen Frears	Won	
Chicago Film Critics Association Awards	Best Actress	Glenn Close	Nominated	
Chicago Film Critics Association Awards	Best Supporting Actress	Michelle Pfeiffer	Nominated	
David di Donatello Awards	Best Foreign Actor	John Malkovich	Nominated	
Fotogramas de Plata	Best Foreign Film	Stephen Frears	Won	
Goldene Kamera	Best International Actress	Glenn Close	Won	
Joseph Plateau Awards	Best Foreign Film		Won	
London Critics Circle Film Awards	Screenwriter of the Year	Christopher Hampton	Won	
Nastro d'Argento	Best Foreign Director	Stephen Frears	Nominated	
National Board of Review Awards	Top Ten Films		2nd Place	
National Society of Film Critics Awards	Best Supporting Actress	Michelle Pfeiffer	3rd Place	
National Society of Film Critics Awards	Best Cinematography	Philippe Rousselot	3rd Place	
Sant Jordi Awards	Best Foreign Film	Stephen Frears	Won	
Sant Jordi Awards	Best Foreign Film (Audience Award)	Stephen Frears	Won	
Sant Jordi Awards	Best Foreign Actor	John Malkovich (Note: Also for Death of a Salesman and The Glass Menagerie.)	Won	
Turkish Film Critics Association Awards	Best Foreign Film		9th Place	
Writers Guild of America Awards	Best Screenplay – Based on Material from Another Medium	Christopher Hampton	Won	

== Related adaptations ==
Almost 25 years after he played Valmont, John Malkovich directed a French-language version of Hampton's play in Paris, which ran at the Théâtre de l'Atelier. In December 2012, the production was brought to Lansburgh Theatre by the Shakespeare Theatre Company for a limited run in Washington, D.C.

In 1989, the film Valmont was released starring Colin Firth, Annette Bening and Meg Tilly.

In 1999, the film Cruel Intentions set the same story in present-day America, starring Sarah Michelle Gellar, Ryan Phillippe and Reese Witherspoon.

In 2012, a Chinese version was released, starring Jang Dong-gun, Zhang Ziyi and Cecilia Cheung. It is loosely based on the novel itself and is set in 1930s Shanghai.

In 2018, the TV series The Great Seducer was released as a modern-day adaptation set in Korea starring Joy (singer), Moon Ga-young, Kim Min-jae (actor, born 1996) and Woo Do-hwan.

Dawn French and Jennifer Saunders parodied Dangerous Liaisons on their sketch show French & Saunders, which then inspired their 1999 comedy series Let Them Eat Cake.

In 2022, the series Dangerous Liaisons premiered on premium television provider Starz. According to writer Harriet Warner, the series is loosely inspired by the novel and explores the marquise's life before the events of the play.
