= Seroussi =

Seroussi is a surname. Notable people with the surname include:

- Edwin Seroussi (born 1952), Israeli musicologist
- Joseph Seroussi (1933–2018), Sudanese-born Canadian and Romanian businessman
- Nir Seroussi (born 1975), Israel-born American music executive
