= Joseph Seroussi =

Romanian businessman (1933 - 2018)

- Born: Joseph Aslan Seroussi; May 26, 1933; Khartoum, Anglo-Egyptian Sudan
- Died: 26 June 2018 (aged 85); Israel
- Other name: Joe
- Occupations: Fashion, manufacturing, businessman
- Known for: Founding Seroussi Luxury clothing company

Joseph Aslan Seroussi, also spelled Yosef Aslan Seroussi, (26 May 1933 – 20 June 2018) was a Sudanese-born Canadian and Romanian businessman.

== Biography ==
=== Career ===
He was the founder of the clothing company Seroussi, which is owned by SC NORADA SA (launched in 1993 in Odorheiu Secuiesc) and focuses on men's fine tailoring. He also owned two other garment factories under different names, also in Odorheiu Secuiesc and in Botoșani.

The companies he owned' factories export to Europe every year 800,000 trousers for men and women (for well-known brands from Germany, France and Scandinavia, such as Hugo Boss, Tiger of Sweden, and many others), and about 700,000 men's suits. Before 2010, the volume was almost triple (about 4 million units). Joseph Seroussi also controls the Bucharest-based company, J&R Enterprises SRL. Around 3,000 employees are still working for his factories.

=== Life ===
Seroussi was born in Khartoum into a Jewish family. He arrived in Great Britain in 1957, and in 1959 he went to Canada. Seroussi came first in Romania in the 1960s. In 1974, he opened a representative office of his Canadian companies in Bucharest, Romanian state-owned enterprises being one of his main suppliers.

Forbes Romania estimated his fortune at €50 million in 2010.

He was nicknamed "King of Garments" in Romania, and was one of the most important men's suits manufacturers alongside Bigotti.

JA Seroussi was also a real estate investor.

=== Death ===
He died on 20 June 2018, aged 85.
