= Vukovar Film Festival =

- Location: Vukovar, Croatia
- Founded: 2007
- Language: International
- Website: www.vukovarfilmfestival.com

The Vukovar Film Festival is an annual film festival established in 2007 and held in the town of Vukovar, Croatia. It usually takes place over five or six days in late August.

== Overview ==
Festival is dedicated to films made in Danube region and neighbouring countries – Austria, Bosnia and Herzegovina, Bulgaria, Montenegro, Czech Republic, Greece, Croatia, Hungary, Moldavia, Germany, Romania, Slovakia, Serbia and Ukraine. It was founded by Igor Rakonić. Screenings were usually held on a barge located in Danube river, but from 8th edition moved to newly opened CineStar movie theater and several other locations in the town. Some screenings are also held in Vinkovci and Valpovo.

== Awards ==
The main award at the festival is called Zlatni šlep (English: The Golden Barge).

In 2014, an award for lifetime achievement was introduced, given to notable filmmakers. Its first recipient was Mustafa Nadarević.

== Award winners ==
=== Golden Barge Award for Best Feature Film ===
Year	Film	Original title	Director	Nationality of Director
2008 (2nd)	Adventurers	Kalandorok	Béla Paczolay	Hungary
2009 (3rd)	Police, Adjective	Polițist, Adjectiv	Corneliu Porumboiu	Romania
2010 (4th)	Honey	Bal	Semih Kaplanoğlu	Turkey
2011 (5th)	Kotlovina	Kotlovina	Tomislav Radić	Croatia
2012 (6th)	Beyond the Hills	După dealuri	Cristian Mungiu	Romania
2013 (7th)	Child's Pose	Poziția copilului	Călin Peter Netzer	Romania
2014 (8th)	Number 55	Broj 55	Kristijan Milić	Croatia
2015 (9th)	Bravo!	Aferim!	Radu Jude	Romania
2016 (10th)	Graduation	Bacalaureat	Cristian Mungiu	Romania
2017 (11th)	In the Fade	Aus dem Nichts	Fatih Akin	Germany
2018 (12th)	I Do Not Care If We Go Down in History as Barbarians	Îmi este indiferent dacă în istorie vom intra ca barbari	Radu Jude	Romania
2019 (13th)	System Crasher	Systemsprenger	Nora Fingscheidt	Germany
2022 (16th)	Wild Roots	Külön falka	Hajni Kis	Hungary

=== Golden Barge Award for Best Short Film ===
Year	Film	Original title	Director	Nationality of Director
2008 (2nd)	In the Morning	Dimineata	Radu Jude	Romania
2009 (3rd)	Party	Tulum	Dalibor Matanić	Croatia
2010 (4th)	Yellow Moon	Žuti mjesec	Zvonimir Jurić	Croatia
2011 (5th)	Silent River	Apele tac	Anca Miruna Lazarescu	Romania
2012 (6th)	Armadingen	Armadingen	Philipp Käßbohrer	Germany
2013 (7th)	The Swing of the Coffin Maker	Die Schaukel des Sargmachers	Elmar Imanov	Azerbaijan
2014 (8th)	My Guide	Újratervezés	Barnabás Tóth	Hungary
2015 (9th)	Art	Arta	Adrian Sitaru	Romania
2016 (10th)	Everything Will Be Okay	Alles wird gut	Patrick Vollrath	Germany
2017 (11th)	A Night in Tokoriki	O noapte in Tokoriki	Roxana Stroe	Romania
2018 (12th)	Lacrimosa	Lacrimosa	Tanja Mairitsch	Austria
2019 (13th)	Chuchotage	Susotázs	Barnabás Tóth	Hungary
2022 (16th)	Branka	Branka	Ákos Kovács	Hungary

=== Golden Barge Award for Best Documentary Film ===
Year	Film	Original title	Director	Nationality of Director
2008 (2nd)	Don't Get Me Wrong	Nu te supara, dar...	Adina Pintilie	Romania
2009 (3rd)	Let's Make Money	Let's Make Money	Erwin Wagenhofer	Austria
2010 (4th)	The Children of the Commune	Die Kinder vom Friedrichshof	Juliane Großheim	Germany
2011 (5th)	Nesvatbov	Nesvatbov	Erika Hníková	Czech Republic
2012 (6th)	The King	Kralj	Dejan Aćimović	Croatia
2013 (7th)	Married to the Swiss Franc	U braku sa švicarcem	Arsen Oremović	Croatia
2014 (8th)	Overdose: Run for a Dream	Overdose: Vágta egy álomért	Gábor Ferenczi	Hungary
2015 (9th)	Toto and His Sisters	Toto şi surorile lui	Alexander Nanau	Romania
2016 (10th)	Outside	Himmelverbot	Andrei Schwartz	Romania
2017 (11th)	The Promise	Das Versprechen	Marcus Vetter & Karin Steinberger	Germany
2018 (12th)	Jam Session	Jam Session	Borislav Kolev	Bulgaria
2019 (13th)	Kalin and the Jail Team	Калин и отбора на затвора	Petko Gyulchev	Bulgaria
2022 (16th)	An Impossible Project	An Impossible Project	Jens Meurer	Germany
