= A Yellow Butterfly Called Sphinx =

Play by Christian Palustran

A Yellow Butterfly Called Sphinx is an epistolary drama by the French playwright Christian Palustran, which was first staged by Patrick Schoenstein, in Nancy, France, Caveau de la Roëlle, in 1988.

== Synopsis ==
The work consists of 33 letters. They are divided into three parts which correspond to the three terms of the school year.

An unknown student writes to her class math teacher, asking her about a math question concerning "infinity". The student signs with the alias X, and asks her to slip her answer into the pile of corrected homework that she is passing around. At first, she is very reluctant. However, she gradually takes pleasure in this correspondence.

She confides about her discipline problems with the class; about the anti-depressive treatment she takes, about her personal life, and why she no longer wears on her jacket a yellow butterfly-shaped brooch.

She comes to multiply the homework to increase their correspondence. This gets her into trouble with parents and management. In short, she is under the influence of X who, feeling this, at times remains voluntarily silent. Unable to take it any longer, she asks him to reveal himself.

== Analysis ==
In writing the story, Christian Palustran said that he challenged himself "to write a drama made only of letters, with emotions and twists, which keep the spectator in suspense ...". But according to a review in the newspaper L 'Est Républicain, it felt as if "it's not really a drama. One could almost say that it is a question of an epistolary police investigation". Arielle Gondonneau in the magazine Vivre à Yvetôt saw the play as "an intimate drama in which the troubled and complicated feelings of adolescence flow, torn between revolt and mad love, between desperation, disguised as modesty, and cynical arrogance..." The work judges neither the teacher nor the student. It simply recounts how their letters will turn their lives upside down.

== History ==
This work represented France in 1988 at the IATA Estivades in Marche-en-Famenne, Belgium.

In 1990, it was performed in Charleroi, Belgium and at the Spanish University Festival in Valladolid by the Théâtre du Belvédère, in 1991 at the National French Drama Centre for Youth in Lille (CDEJ) in a staging by François Gérard.

It was staged in various cities of France and in particular in Paris, Espace Beaujon, in 2013, directed by Nadine Hermet, and in Chartres.

The work has been translated and performed in various languages and countries: in 2003, in Romania, Baïa Mare Theater, directed by Gavril Pinte and in 2006, in the United States (New York City, New Loft Ensemble, 13th Street Repertory Theatre), directed by Josh Edelman.

It was published in a trilingual English-French-Italian edition and is among the plays selected to represent contemporary French theater in the book Directory of Contemporary French-Language Theater by Claude Confortès.

It was also transcribed into braille.

== Publications and translations ==
- Un papillon jaune appelé Sphinx, A Yellow Butterfly called Sphinx, Una farfalla gialla chiamata Sfinge, La Fontaine, 2002, ISBN 2-907846-64-7. Trilingual edition in French, English and Italian.

== Bibliography ==
- Confortès, Claude (2000). Répertoire du théâtre contemporain de langue française (in French). Paris (France): Nathan. p. 294. ISBN 2-09-190192-X.
