= Château de Guermantes =

Château in Seine-et-Marne, France

Coordinates: 48°51′11″N 2°41′52″E

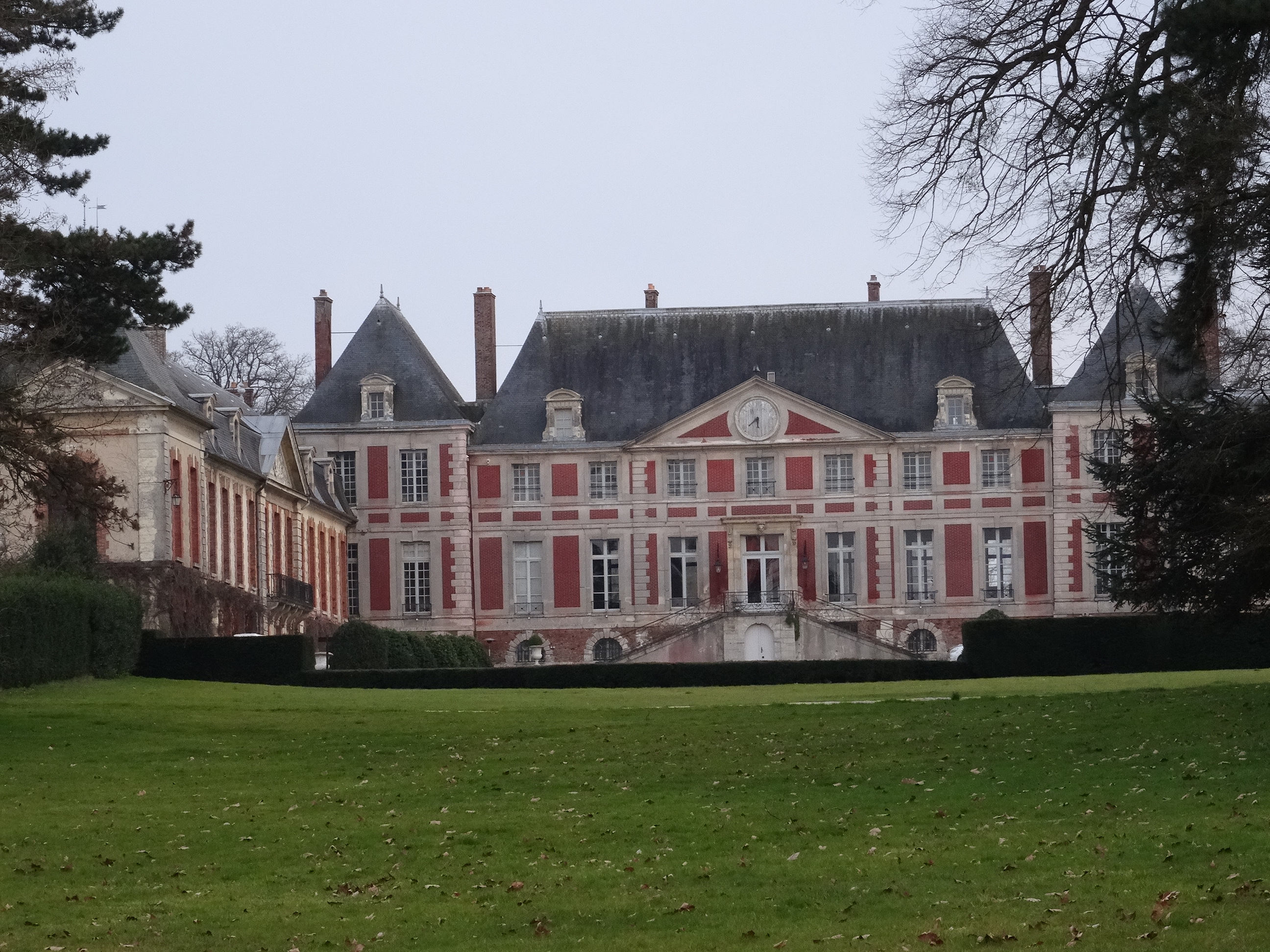
Château de Guermantes, 2015

Château de Guermantes (French pronunciation: [ʃato də ɡɛʁmɑ̃t]) is a Château located in Guermantes, Seine-et-Marne, northern France. It is a listed monument since 1944.

== Construction and design ==
Construction of the Château de Guermantes was undertaken by Claude Viole (died 1638), whose family had possessed the fief of "Le Chemin" since the mid sixteenth century. Paulin Pondre (1650-1723) purchased the property in 1698. He engaged Jules Hardouin-Mansart for renovations to the building, completed in 1710 (Ministère de la culture), and André Le Nôtre to lay out the garden. Pondre was receveur des finances at Lyon and had become one of the most powerful financiers of the reign of Louis XIV; he was appointed President of the Cour des Comptes in 1713. Guermantes was the scene of memorable fêtes.

Guermantes is built of brick with stone facings and quoins, in an H-plan, with projecting pavilions flanking the corps de logis, under tall sloping slate roofs and tall chimney stacks. The house stands in a large park. The front is now approached in the English manner, with a drive sweeping to the side and an unbroken expanse of lawn. On the garden front, the house stands on a terrace with steps leading down to the former parterre, which is now lawn, and the expanse of water in the formally shaped pièce d'eau, from the far end of which the château is reflected in its entirety.

The original furnishings of Guermantes have been scattered, but rooms retain their seventeenth- and eighteenth-century boiseries. The family Pondre maintained the property until 1929, by which time Marcel Proust had employed "Guermantes" for the family at the top of the French society he was describing. There has never been a duchesse de Guermantes; Proust's "château de Guermantes", unreachably beyond the limits of family walks from Combray then purchased by the Verdurins, was based on the duc de Sully's Château de Villebon, Eure-et-Loir.

== Ownership by John Law ==
In 1719 the Scottish economist and financier John Law purchased Guermantes for 800,000 livres. He only enjoyed possession for a matter of months. When the economic bubble created by his Mississippi Scheme burst, his life came under threat and he begged Philippe II, Duke of Orléans, the Regent, for permission to leave Paris. The Regent initially only granted Law permission to retire to the Château de Guermantes, and it was there that he spent his final days in France. On the evening of 17 December 1720, Law set off from the Château de Guermantes and fled France never to return. Paulin Pondre was able to take possession once more; his family were dispossessed at the Revolution.

== Ownership by the Hottinguer family ==
In December 1920, the estate was acquired by banker Maurice Hottinguer (1872-1969), an heir of an old Zurich family that had established a bank in Paris before 1789 and later participated in the creation of the Bank of France; his paternal ancestor, Jean-Conrad, was named Baron of the Empire on September 19, 1810.

Guy de Rothschild, who, as a child, resided in the neighboring Château de Ferrières, recalled in his memoirs, how so very few kids surrounded him and his sisters during the long seasons in his château, that the visits of the Hottinguer children felt like a Christmas present.

In 1921, during the restoration work, he and his wife "camped out" in the north wing. In 1939, they hosted their cousins, the Maupeou sisters, and their mother there.

In 1942, Maurice Hottinguer gave it to his son, Pierre (1917-2006), upon his marriage to Sylvie Feray, "who surrounded it with enlightened care," according to Claude Frégnac.

In 1944, the château was threatened with destruction by the occupying forces in retaliation for the execution of a German soldier by members of the Resistance, but was saved thanks to the intervention of Blanche Hottinguer (d. 1951), née de Maupeou.

While its furnishings have since disappeared, several rooms retain their 17th- and 18th-century painted decoration.

Sold in 2008, the château has been converted into a seminar center and is not open to the public; the tenant company is Châteauform.

== Use as a film location ==
The real Guermantes provided locations for Philippe de Broca for Cartouche (1962), Moonraker (1979), the Polish director Andrzej Wajda for Danton, Miloš Forman for Amadeus (1984) and Stephen Frears for Dangerous Liaisons (1988). Guermantes is not open to the public. It lies 2 kilometres (1.2 mi) from Euro Disneyland.
