= Gérard James =

American set decorator

- Occupation: Set decorator
- Years active: 1974–1999

Gérard James is an American set decorator. He won an Academy Award in the category Best Art Direction for the film Dangerous Liaisons.

== Selected filmography ==
- Dangerous Liaisons (1988)
