= H. H. Wieder =

Romanian-born American physicist (1919–2018)

Herman "Harry" Wieder (4 June 1919 – 6 June 2018) was a Romanian-born American physicist.

He was born Bistrița, Romania, and moved to the United States in 1937. Four years later, Wieder naturalized as an American citizen and joined the army in the midst of World War II, serving with the 2nd Armored Division. After earning a bachelor's degree in applied physics from the University of California, Los Angeles, Wieder worked for the National Bureau of Standards and later the Naval Weapons Center, before moving to the Navy Electronics Laboratory. After a stint at the Naval Ocean Systems Center, Wieder returned to academia, teaching at the University of California, San Diego from 1981 to 1993. Wieder was a fellow of the American Physical Society, as well as the Institute of Electrical and Electronics Engineers and American Vacuum Society.
