= Touch Me Not =

2018 film by Adina Pintilie

- Romanian film poster
- Romanian: Nu mă atinge
- Directed by: Adina Pintilie
- Written by: Adina Pintilie
- Produced by: Bianca Oana; Philippe Avril; Adina Pintilie
- Starring: Laura Benson; Tómas Lemarquis
- Cinematography: George Chiper-Lillemark
- Edited by: Adina Pintilie
- Music by: Ivo Paunov
- Production companies: Manekino Film; 4 Proof Film; AGITPROP; Les Films de l'Étranger; Pink Productions; Rohfilm
- Distributed by: Alamode Film (Germany); Pilot Film (Czech Republic); Nour Films (France)
- Release dates: 22 February 2018 (Berlin); 31 October 2018 (France); 1 November 2018 (Germany)
- Running time: 125 minutes
- Countries: Romania; Germany Czech Republic; France; Bulgaria
- Languages: English; German
- Budget: €1 million

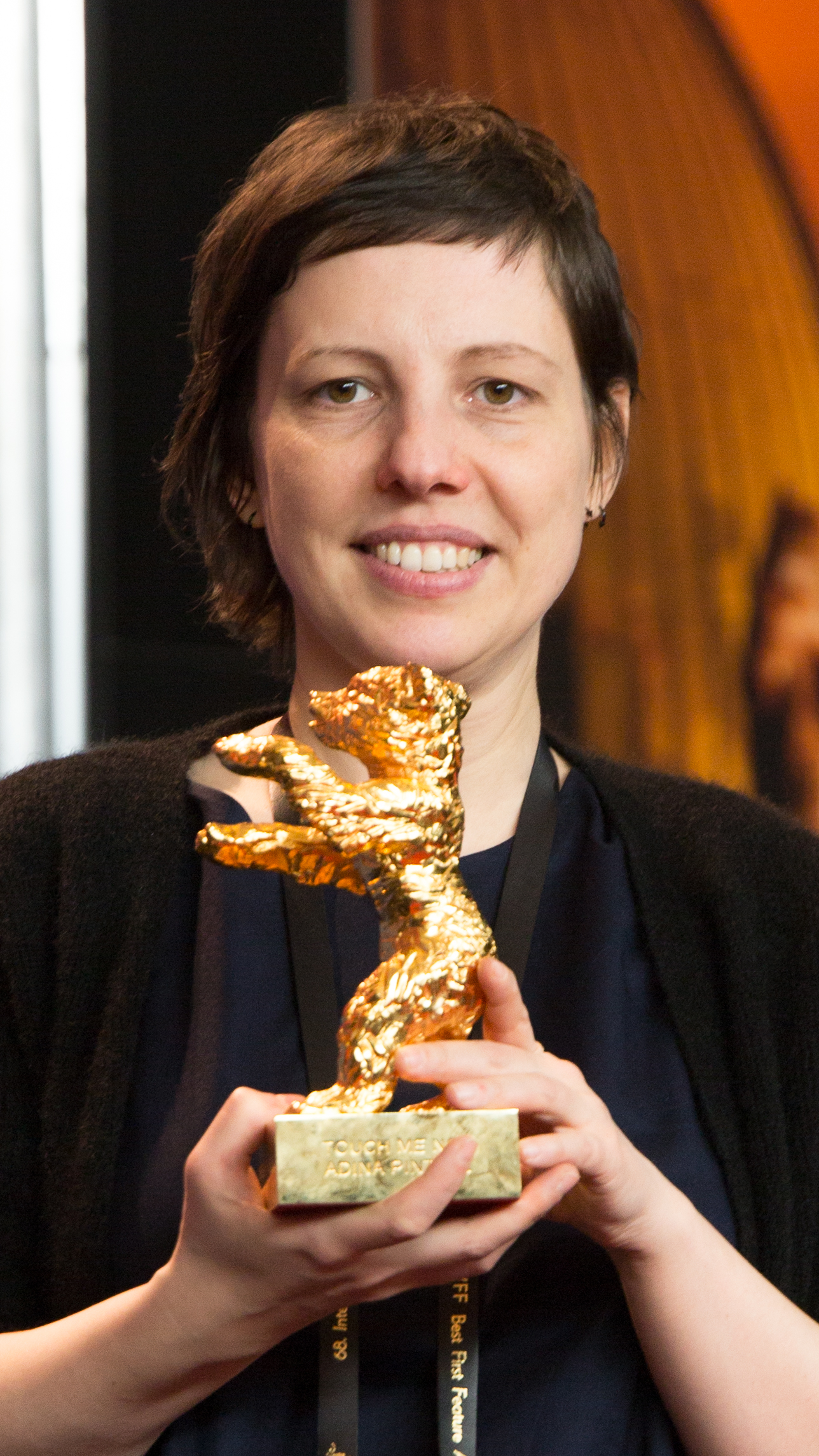
Adina Pintilie

Touch Me Not (Romanian: Nu mă atinge) is a 2018 experimental docudrama film written and directed by Adina Pintilie. Starring Laura Benson, Tómas Lemarquis, Adina Pintilie and Dirk Lange, it addresses popular prejudices related to intimacy and sexuality.

The film had its world premiere in the main competition of the 68th Berlin International Film Festival, where it won the Golden Bear.

== Cast ==
- Laura Benson as Herself
- Tómas Lemarquis as Himself
- Adina Pintilie as Herself
- Dirk Lange as Radu
- Hanna Hofmann as Herself
- Christian Bayerlein as Himself
- Grit Uhlemann as Herself
- Irmena Chichikova as Mona
- Seani Love as Himself

== Reception ==
According to a list by Screen International, the film received an average rating of 1,5 of four possible stars by film critics at the Berlinale and was thereby in the third-last place of all films in the Berlinale main competition. It was seen as a controversial film, viewers left the cinema in rows. The Golden Bear awarded by the Berlinale jury thus came as a surprise.

On review aggregator website Rotten Tomatoes, the film holds an approval rating of 59% based on 41 reviews, and an average rating of 5.8/10. The site's critical consensus reads, "Touch Me Not deserves admiration for its efforts to debunk stereotypes and further a necessary dialogue, even if the execution never lives up to those lofty ambitions." On Metacritic, the film has a weighted average score of 68 out of 100, based on 5 critics, indicating "generally favorable reviews".

Deborah Young of The Hollywood Reporter praised the film, describing it as "an eye-opening look at human sexuality". She stated, "Though not every moment is fascinating to watch, most moments are, and adult audiences should find its frank presentation of the diversity of intimacy thought-provoking and possibly therapeutic."

In a negative review, Peter Bradshaw of The Guardian called the film "embarrassingly awful", criticising "its mediocrity, its humourless self-regard, its fatuous and shallow approach to its ostensible theme of intimacy, and the clumsy way all this was sneakily elided with Euro-hardcore cliches about BDSM, alternative sexualities, fetishism and exhibitionism." He described the film's recognition at the Berlinale as a "calamity" for the festival.
