= The Omission =

2018 film directed by Sebastián Schjaer

- Film poster
- Directed by: Sebastián Schjaer
- Written by: Sebastián Schjaer
- Starring: Sofía Brito
- Release date: 17 February 2018 (Berlin)
- Running time: 90 minutes
- Country: Argentina
- Language: Spanish

The Omission (Spanish: La omisión) is a 2018 Argentine drama film directed by Sebastián Schjaer. It was screened in the Panorama section at the 68th Berlin International Film Festival.

== Cast ==
- Sofía Brito as Paula
- Malena Hernández Díaz as Malena
- Laura López Moyano as Laura
- Victoria Raposo as Pilar
