= Bigotti =

Romanian men's clothing retailer

- Industry: Retailer
- Founded: (1997)
- Products: Clothing
- Website: www.bigotti.eu

Bigotti, also known as Bigotti Exclusive, is an International brand of men's clothing manufacturer owned by Graftex Prodcom SRL. Bigotti is promoted as a luxury ready-made clothes and leather goods for men, offering style, quality and diversity for an original, successful image.
Other brands owned by Graftex Prodcom SRL are Massini Camicia, Egobigotti, Artigiani and Il Capo Uomo.
