= Attila Verestóy =

Romanian politician and chemical engineer (1954–2018)

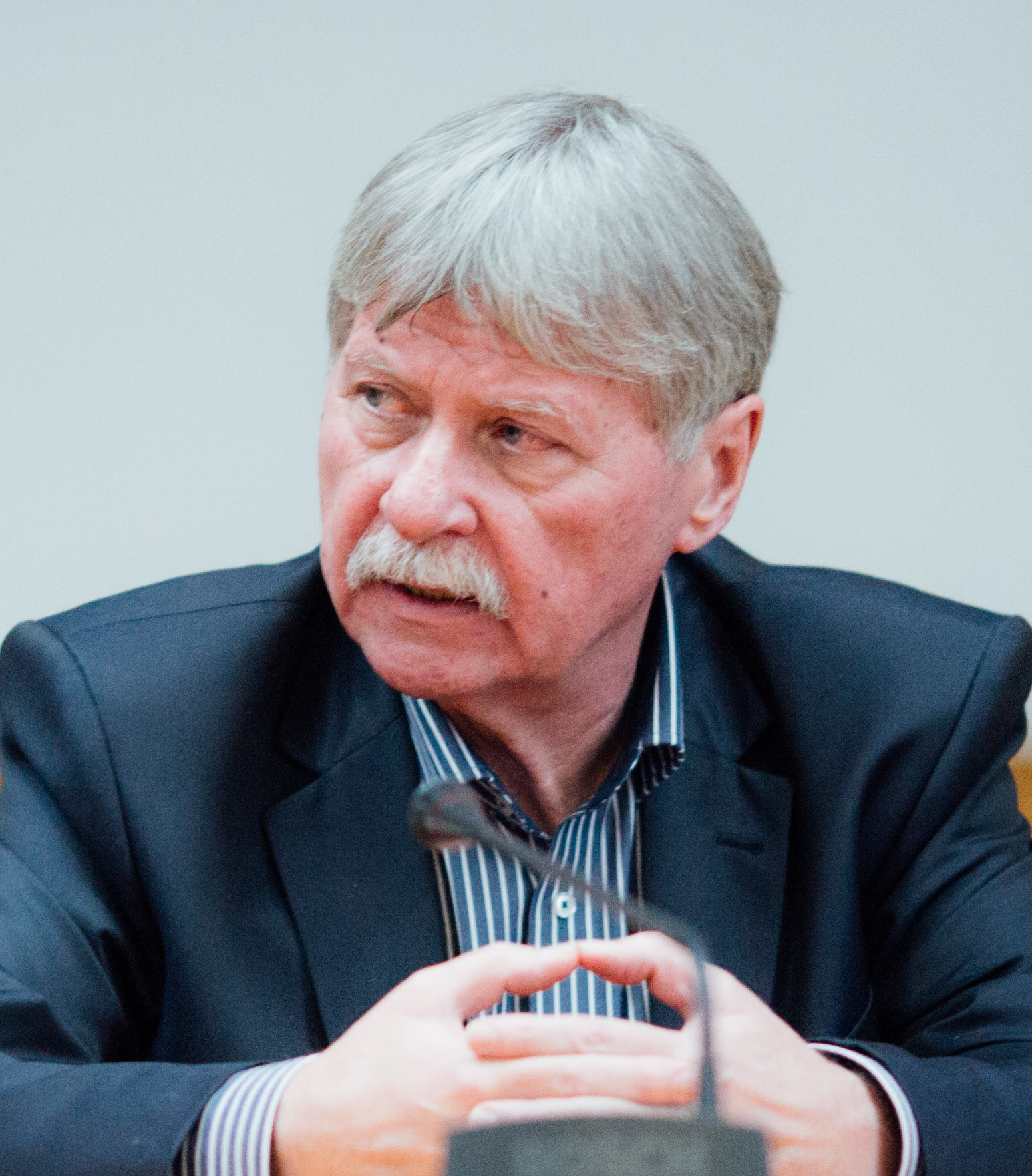

Member of the Romanian Senate for Harghita County
- In office 9 June 1990 – 23 January 2018

Personal details
- Born: 1 March 1954
- Died: 24 January 2018 (aged 63)
- Party: Democratic Alliance of Hungarians in Romania

Attila Verestóy (1 March 1954 – 24 January 2018) was a Romanian chemical engineer and politician. A member of the Democratic Alliance of Hungarians in Romania (UDMR), he was also an elected member of the Romanian Senate for Harghita County from 1990 until 2018.

== Biography ==
He was born to ethnic Hungarian parents in Odorheiu Secuiesc and completed secondary studies at the town's Petru Groza Theoretical High School (now called Tamási Áron). In 1972, he enrolled at the Politehnica University of Bucharest, graduating from the Chemical Technology Faculty six years later. He then enrolled in a master's programme in Chemical Engineering at the same institution, and in 1999 earned a doctorate in Chemistry from Politehnica, specialising in inorganic chemistry and environmental protection.

From 1978 to 1979, he worked at a factory in Gheorgheni, followed by a stint as engineer at a factory in his hometown from 1979 until the following year. From 1980 to 1983, he was a lecturer at his alma mater's Industrial Chemistry Faculty. From 1983 to 1989, he was a scientific researcher at the Institute of Inorganic Chemistry Research in Bucharest, advancing to chief scientific researcher in 1989. Verestóy had over 60 scientific works, presented at conferences and congresses, and co-authored three books on chemical engineering and environmental protection. He also published articles about security policy.

According to Verestóy, his activities during the 1980s under the Communist regime drew the attention of the Securitate secret police. After attempting to contact the head of an association in Hungary, his participation in any international programme was forbidden. Although his merit scholarship for studying abroad was approved by a reviewing committee, the Securitate vetoed the initiative. Later, together with a friend, he established contact with diplomats at the Hungarian embassy in Bucharest, and with their help obtained Hungarian-language mass-media materials to be distributed in Transylvania. During 1989, he was placed under surveillance and his telephones were tapped; ultimately, he was dismissed from his teaching position. When the Romanian Revolution of 1989 broke out, he joined the uprising a day before the overthrow of Nicolae Ceauşescu, and helped found the UDMR in the following days.

Verestóy entered politics following the Revolution, serving in January 1990 as an adviser to the National Salvation Front (FSN) and a member of the group of advisers to Károly Király, one of the Front's vice presidents. From February to May of that year, he belonged to the Provisional National Unity Council and was the president of its minorities committee. Elected senator in May 1990, he was re-elected in 1992, 1996, 2000, 2004, 2008, 2012 and 2016. He held various positions and committee assignments within the Senate: member (1990–1992; 2008–2018), secretary (1992), and quaestor (2010–2018) of the permanent bureau; defence, public order and national security committee (1993–1996); culture, art and mass media committee (1992–1996); public health committee (1996–1997); committee for investigating abuses, combating corruption and petitions (2000–2001; 2004–2005); joint committee providing oversight to the activities of Serviciul Român de Informaţii (since 2000); joint committee of 1989 revolutionaries (2004); equal opportunity committee (2008–2009). From 1992 to 2008, he was leader of the UDMR's parliamentary delegation. Also, from 1997 to 2007, he headed the UDMR chapter based in Odorheiu Secuiesc.

As of 2009, Verestóy was the third-wealthiest Romanian politician, with holdings of €100 million, down from €250 million a year earlier, with losses due to the recession. Nicknamed the "logging king", he had significant investments in the wood industry; it was there that he began to build up his wealth, and he was dubbed an "oligarch of the transition" by President Traian Băsescu. Other companies in which he held a substantial amount of shares are Transgaz and Rompetrol. As of 2007, he owned three apartments he built in Bucharest that year, an older apartment in the capital and one in Odorheiu Secuiesc, and a vacation house in Ilfov County. That year, prosecutors from the National Anticorruption Directorate investigated him for allegedly earning €10 million from transactions involving a regional investment fund that he had made as a result of information obtained due to his parliamentary office, but decided not to indict him.

Verestóy ran a charitable foundation and was president of the Odorhei Handball Club. He and his wife had one son. Diagnosed with lung cancer in 2017, he died while undergoing treatment in Vienna, Austria the following year.
