= François Bréda =

Hungarian-Romanian writer and literary critic

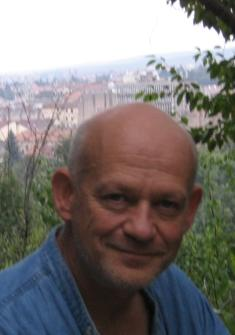
- Cluj-Napoca, 2008.
- Born: 20 February 1955; Deva, Romania
- Died: 16 May 2018 (aged 62)
- Occupations: professor, essayist, poet, literary critic, literary historian, translator, theatrologist
- Writing career
- Period: 1978–2018
- Literary movement: Postmodernism

François Bréda (Hungarian: Bréda Ferenc; 20 February 1956 – 16 May 2018) was a Hungarian-Romanian essayist, poet, literary critic, literary historian, translator and theatrologist.

== Biography ==
On his mother's side he is grandson of writer, settlement historian, professor Lajos Lévai (1894, Kolozsvár – 1974) from Odorheiu Secuiesc. Her mother is educationalist Enikő Zsuzsanna Lévai. His father, reformed minister Ferenc Bréda (1924–2000) was dean of Hunedoara-Alba County between 1969 and 1988. He graduated elementary school in Odorheiu Secuiesc and Deva. The multicultural atmosphere of his native town follows him during his childhood and primary school years. His first writings appeared in Ifjúmunkás, a youth periodical published in Bucharest. He spent his military service in Northern Dobruja near the Black Sea (1974–1975). From 1975 he studied at the Hungarian-French faculty of the Cluj-Napoca University. He also attended Greek and Latin optional courses at the classical philology faculty in Cluj. He was one of the regular dwellers of the Library of Academy during his student years. It was this period he intensely studied the important authors of scholastic and medieval philosophy (Anselm of Canterbury, Saint Thomas Aquinas, Albertus Magnus, William of Ockham, Pierre Abelard, Duns Scotus). During summer holidays he worked as construction day-labourer, mason stringy at church reconstructions (Haró, Marosillye, Hunedoara County) and ringer. Between 1977 and 1979 he worked as editor of the Hungarian pages of Echinox cultural university periodical in Cluj, together with András Mihály Beke and Zoltán Bretter. He graduated at the philology faculty of Babeş-Bolyai University in Cluj, receiving qualification in Hungarian-French language and literature. Between 1979 and 1984 he worked as first editor of the Hungarian pages of Napoca Universitară cultural periodical. Between 1979 and 1984 he also worked as teacher of Hungarian literature and grammar at the Huedin Primary School. Between 1984 and 1991 he worked as professor of French language and literature in secondary schools, lyceums and high schools in France, first in Anjou and Vendée (Angers, Cholet), then in settlements near Paris (Faremoutiers, Saint-Maur-des-Fossés, Coulommiers, Pontault-Combault). In 1985 he received the degree of Magister at the Nantes University, in the field of French and comparative history of literature. Between 1985 and 1991 he was doctorandus of French history of literature at the Angers University, being disciple of literary historian George Cesbron. In the circle of Présence de Gabriel Marcel literary-philosophical fellowship he made acquaintance with Paul Ricœur, Cardinal Jean-Marie Lustiger, Archbishop of Paris, writer Claude Aveline, Georges Lubin, publisher of George Sand's correspondences, as well as philosopher André Comte-Sponville and other important personalities of French culture. He corresponded with sociologist Pierre Bourdieu and Samuel Beckett. Between 1984 and 1986 he lived in Angers and Cholet, then in Paris between 1986 and 1991. Between 1991 and 1992 he worked as editor at Jelenlét cultural periodical in Cluj. In 1991 he was founding member of György Bretter Literary Circle, a society with great literary traditions that had ceased to exist in 1983 and being revived after the 1989 revolution in Romania. Between 1992 and 1993 he worked as editor at the Cluj branch of Bucharest-based Kriterion Publishing House. From 1993 he is founding board member of György Bretter Literary Circle. Between 1991 and 1994 he taught French language and literature at Brassai Sámuel Lyceum in Cluj. In 1999 he received a doctorate in theory of literature with his paper on the literary and drama critical work of French existentialist philosopher Gabriel Marcel, at the Philology Faculty of Babeş-Bolyai University in Cluj. From 1995 he works as assistant professor at the Theatre and Television Faculty of Babeş-Bolyai University, teaching universal theatre history of Antiquity, basic notions of dramaturgy, theatre aesthetics, Hungarian literature and rhetorics. He discovered the literary oeuvre of Alfréd Reinhold (Alfred Reynolds; 1907, Budapest – 1993, London). He translated from French and Romanian languages.

== Works ==
=== Volumes in Hungarian ===
- A létezéstől a lehetőségig (From Being to Possibility). Essays in comparative history of literature and philosophy, Kriterion Publishing House, Forrás-series, Bucharest, 1980.
- Tűzpróba (Ordeal by Fire). Poems. Kriterion Publishing House, Bucharest, 1984.
- Mentális Tárgyak Múzeuma (Museum of Mental Objects). Concrete poems. Matthias Studio Paper, Cluj-Napoca, 1999.
- Antracit (Anthracite). Ortho-existential essay. Előretolt Helyőrség Publishing House, Cluj-Napoca, 2002. ISBN 93-7804-548-0
- Golania Magna. A neo-goliárd költészet kritikai vetületei. (Golania Magna. Critical Aspects of Neo-Goliard Poetry). Critical works, Grinta Publishing House, Cluj-Napoca, 2005.
- Mysterium Mythologiae. Philosophical essay. Grinta Publishing House, Cluj-Napoca, 2005. ISBN 973-7651-06-5
- Nemo. Poems. AB-ART Publishing House, Bratislava, 2004. ISBN 80-8087-010-1
- Az elszállt szitakötő (Butterfly in Mid-Air). Novel. AB-ART Publishing House, Bratislava, 2005. ISBN 80-8087-028-4
- Diva Deva. Philosophical essay. Grinta Publishing House, Cluj-Napoca, 2006. ISBN 973-7651-65-0 ISBN 9789737651655
- Golania Magna Secunda. Mitokritikák a neo-goliárd irodalomról (Golania Magna Secunda. Mytho-chritics on Neo-Goliard Literature). Critical writings, Irodalmi Jelen Books, Arad, 2007. ISBN 978-973-7648-11-2
- De amore. Philosophical essay. AB-ART Publishing House, Bratislava, 2008. ISBN 978-80-8087-045-4
- Boldogok és Bolondok (The Happy and the Insane). Philosophical essay. AB-ART Publishing House, Bratislava, 2008. ISBN 978-80-8087-035-5
- Lali lakomái (Lali's Feasts). Novel. AB-ART Publishing House, Bratislava, 2008. ISBN 978-80-8087-053-9
- Apolló apológiái. Aphorismes. AB-ART Publishing House, Bratislava, 2009. ISBN 978-80-8087-067-6
- Angyal a Monostoron. Novel. Erdélyi Híradó Kiadó, Előretolt Helyőrség Szépirodalmi Páholy, Előretolt Helyőrség Könyvek Publishing House. Kolozsvár, 2012. ISBN 978-606-8118-24-6
- De amore. Az emberi psziché Galaktikus Gáláiról, Sikamlós Skáláiról & Gáláns Galádságairól. Philosophical essay. A borító John Roddam Spencer Stanhope : Cupid and Psyche című képének felhasználásával készült. Illusztrációk : Zichy Mihály aktjai. Orpheusz Publishing House, Budapest, 2016. ISBN 9789639809673
- Levelek az Utókornak. Theatrvm Temporis. (Letters post Posterity. Theatrvm Temporis). Philosophical essay. Erdélyi Híradó Kiadó Publishing House, Kolozsvár, 2017. ISBN 9786068118475
- Bab és Babér. Theatrum epicum. (Bean and Laurel). Novel. Irodalmi Jelen Könyvek Publishing House, Arad, 2017. ISBN 9789737926128

=== Volumes in Romanian ===
- Fiinţă şi teatru (Being and Theatre). Philosophical essay. Dacia Publishing House, Teatru series, Cluj-Napoca, 2003, ISBN 973-35-1705-4
- Scrisori despre comicul existenţial. Correspondenţă transtemporală (Letters on Existential Humour. Trans-temporal Correspondence). Philosophical essay. Grinta Publishing House, Cluj-Napoca, 2006. ISBN 973-7651-44-8
- Oglinda Ochiului. Speculum spectationis (The Mirror of the Eye). Philosophical essay. Eikon Publishing House – Editura Remus, Cluj-Napoca, 2010. ISBN 978-973-757-338-4 ISBN 978-973-7915-18-4
- Cercetare în Cer. Philosophical essay. Editura Școala Ardeleană Publishing House, Cluj-Napoca, 2017. ISBN 978-606-797-174-3

=== Volumes in French ===
- La critique littéraire et dramatique de Gabriel Marcel (Literary and Drama Critical Work of Gabriel Marcel). Essay, Grinta Publishing House, Cluj-Napoca, 2004. ISBN 9737924487
- Déclin et Déclic. Philosophical essay. Remus Publishing House, Cluj-Napoca, 2004. ISBN 973-7915-00-3
- Genivs loci. Philosophical essay. Editura Școala Ardeleană Publishin House, Cluj-Napoca, 2017. ISBN 978-606-797-166-8

== Essays in Literary Critic and History of Ideas ==
- Ave Csehy ! In : Helikon, 28 (25 June 2007). See Zoltán Csehy (in Hungarian)
- Vanda ... Van ! Az Örök Őrök (Vanda... Exists! The Guards of Eternity). In: Korunk, August 2006. (in Hungarian)
- Esti mese (Bedtime Story). György Méhes. In : Helikon, 2002/ 7, 2–3. (in Hungarian)
- Egy világrendszer keletkezéséről. Adalékok Galilei Dialogójához. (On the Becoming of a World System. To Galilei's Dialogo). In: Galilei, Dialogue Concerning the Two Chief World Systems, the Ptolemaic and a Copernican. Preface written and notes compiled by Ferenc Bréda. Kriterion, Téka-series, Bucharest, 1983. (in Hungarian)
- Az öntudat alkonya. (Dawn of Consciousness) In : A létezéstől a lehetőségig (From Being to Possibility). Kriterion, Bucharest, 1980. (in Hungarian)
- Gabriel Marcel et ses contemporains. François Mauriac et Gabriel Marcel. In : Confluențe și particularități europene. Coordonator : Valentin Trifescu. Editura Eikon, Cluj, 2010, pp. 183–209. (in French) ISBN 978-973-757-351-3
- Cercetare în Cer. Concepția muzicală a Cerului creștin în gândirea Sfântului Ioan Gură de Aur. In : Austrian Influences and Regional Identities in Transilvania, AB-ART, Bratislava; Grenzenlose Literatur, Frauenkirchen, 2012, pp. 248–254. (in Romanian) ISBN 978-80-8087-119-2
- De Cluj jusqu'au Caire. Un créateur multiculturel : le poète, l'écrivain et le metteur en scène Shawkat Seif Eddine bey. In : Romanian – Moroccan Forms of Manifestation in the European Space. Editura Institutului de Științe Politice și Relații Internaționale, Academia Română, București, 2014, pp. 94–108. (in French)
- Genius Loci. In : Geografii identitare – Identități culturale. Coordinatori Pavel Pușcaș, Valentin Trifescu, Simion Molnar, Vali Ilyes. Volumul 1. Simpozionul multicultural Diva Deva. Presa Universitară Clujeană, Cluj-Napoca, 2014, pp. 31–33. (in French) ISBN 978-973-595-624-0
- Cerul creștin : patrimoniu etern al multiversului identității locale transcosmice. Geografia teo-teatrologică a Cerului în gândirea Sfântului Ioan Gură de Aur. In : Patrimoniu și identitate locală. Actele conferinței Patrimoniu și identitate locală, Valea Verde, 5–7 septembrie 2014. Coordinatori : Valentin Trifescu, Vali Ilyes, François Bréda. Editura Universității Alexandru Ioan Cuză, Iași, 2015. pp. 163–176. (in Romanian) ISBN 978-606-714-161-0
- A létezés mint közönség. Theatrum et theos (teo-teatrológiai napló). In : Előretolt Helyőrség. Ezredévkönyv. Erdélyi Híradó kiadó, Kolozsvár, 2015, pp. 40–42. (in Hungarian) ISBN 978-606-8118-39-0
- Le temple des temps dans le théâtre de Protée. In : Patrimoniu și identitate locală. Actele conferinței Patrimoniu și identitate locală, Valea Verde, 5–7 septembrie 2014. Coordinatori : Valentin Trifescu, Vali Ilyes, François Bréda. Editura Universității Alexandru Ioan Cuză, Iași, 2015. pp. 13–16. (in French) ISBN 978-606-714-161-0
- La théologie de la nudité dans la pensée théo-théâtrologique de Saint Jean Chrysostome. Introduction. In : Text și discurs religios. Nr. 7 / 2015. Lucrările Conferinței Naționale Text și discurs religios. Ediția a VII/a, Sibiu, 7–8 noiembrie 2014. Editura Universității Alexandru Ioan Cuză Publishing House, Iași, 2015, pp. 149–153. (in French) ISSN 2066-4818

== Translations[modifier | modifier le code] ==
- Gabriel Marcel, Omul problematic, L’homme problématique (The problematic man). Text translated into Romanian and annotated by François Bréda and Ștefan Melancu. Les Éditions Apostrof, coll. Filosofie contemporană, Cluj-Napoca, 1998.
- Jehan Calvus (Chelu Ivan Péter), Bumgártész. Text translated from Romanian into Hungarian by François Bréda. Kalligram Publishing, Bratislava, 2004.
- Gabriel Marcel, Semnul Crucii , Le Signe de la Croix. (The Sign of the Cross). Text translated into Romanian and annotated by François Bréda and Radu Teampău. Târgu Jiu, 1999. Show performed at the Elvira Godeanu Theater in Târgu Jiu in 1999.
- Jean Cocteau, Emberi hang, La Voix Humaine. (The Human Voice). Text translated into Hungarian by François Bréda. In: Napoca Universitară, 1–3 / 1981.
- Christian Palustran, Hăul , Abîmes. . (Abyss). Text translated into Romanian by François Bréda and Radu Teampău. Show performed at the Turda State Theater, 1998.
- Gabriel Chifu, Száz költemény O sută de poeme, Cent poèmes. (One hundred poems). Text translated from Romanian into Hungarian by François Bréda, 2008.

== Prizes ==
- Méhes György-Grand Prize, 2005.
- Bretter György-Prize, 2010.

== Distinction ==
- The Knight Cross of Order of Merit of Hungary, 2017.

== Memberships ==
He is member of Hungarian Writers' Ligue in Transylvania, Romanian Writers' Union, Présence de Gabriel Marcel Association and the Public Body of the Hungarian Academy of Sciences.
