= 68th Berlin International Film Festival =

2018 film festival in Berlin, Germany

- Festival poster
- Opening film: Isle of Dogs
- Closing film: Touch Me Not
- Location: Berlin, Germany
- Founded: 1951
- Awards: Golden Bear: Touch Me Not
- Festival date: 15–25 February 2018
- Website: berlinale.de

Berlin International Film Festival chronology
- 69th 67th

The 68th annual Berlin International Film Festival took place from 15 to 25 February 2018. German filmmaker Tom Tykwer served as Jury President.

American film director Wes Anderson's animated film Isle of Dogs opened the festival, becoming first animated film to open the fest. Romanian film Touch Me Not written and directed by Adina Pintilie won the Golden Bear, which also served as the closing night film.

== Juries ==
=== Main Competition ===
- Tom Tykwer, German filmmaker, producer and composer - Jury President
- Cécile de France, Belgian actress
- Chema Prado, Spanish journalist and film critic
- Adele Romanski, American film producer
- Ryuichi Sakamoto, Japanese musician and composer
- Stephanie Zacharek, American journalist and film critic

=== Best First Feature Award ===
- Jonas Carpignano, Italian filmmaker
- Călin Peter Netzer, Romanian filmmaker and producer
- Noa Regev, Israeli director of the Jerusalem Cinematheque and the Jerusalem Film Festival

=== Documentary Award ===
- Cíntia Gil, Portuguese curator of international festivals and events
- Ulrike Ottinger, German filmmaker and photographer
- Eric Schlosser, American journalist and writer (United States)

=== Short Film Competition ===
- Diogo Costa Amarante, Portuguese director and director of photography
- Jyoti Mistry, South-African director and teacher at the Wits School of Arts in Johannesburg
- Mark Toscano, American curator of international festivals and events

== Official Sections ==
=== Main Competition ===
The following films were selected for the main competition for the Golden Bear and Silver Bear awards:

English title	Original title	Director(s)	Production country
3 Days in Quiberon	3 Tage in Quiberon	Emily Atef	Germany, Austria, France
Damsel		David Zellner and Nathan Zellner	United States
Don't Worry, He Won't Get Far on Foot		Gus Van Sant	United States
Daughter of Mine	Figlia mia	Laura Bispuri	Italy, Germany, Switzerland
Dovlatov	Довлатов	Aleksei Alekseivich German	Russia, Poland, Serbia
Eva		Benoît Jacquot	France
The Heiresses	Las herederas	Marcelo Martinessi	Paraguay, Germany, Uruguay, Norway, Brazil, France
In the Aisles	In den Gängen	Thomas Stuber	Germany
Isle of Dogs		Wes Anderson	United States, Germany
My Brother's Name Is Robert and He Is an Idiot	Mein Bruder heißt Robert und ist ein Idiot	Philip Gröning	Germany, France
Mug	Twarz	Małgorzata Szumowska	Poland
Museum	Museo	Alonso Ruizpalacios	Mexico
Pig	خوک	Mani Haghighi	Iran
The Prayer	La prière	Cédric Kahn	France
The Real Estate	Toppen av ingenting	Måns Månsson	Sweden, United Kingdom
Season of the Devil	Ang panahon ng halimaw	Lav Diaz	Philippines
Touch Me Not	Nu mă atinge-mă	Adina Pintilie	Romania, Germany, Czech Republic, Bulgaria, France
Transit		Christian Petzold	Germany, France
U – 22 July	Utøya 22. juli	Erik Poppe	Norway

=== Out of competition ===
The following films were selected to be screened out of competition:

English title	Original title	Director(s)	Production country
7 Days in Entebbe		José Padilha	United States, United Kingdom
Ága		Milko Lazarov	Bulgaria, Germany, France
Black 47		Lance Daly	Ireland, Luxembourg
Eldorado		Markus Imhoof	Switzerland, Germany
Unsane		Steven Soderbergh	United States

=== Panorama ===
The following films were selected for the Panorama section:

English title	Original title	Director(s)	Production country
L'Animale		Katharina Mückstein	Austria
Boys Cry	La terra dell'abbastanza	Damiano and Fabio D'Innocenzo	Italy
Foreboding	予兆 散歩する侵略者	Kiyoshi Kurosawa	Japan
Garbage		Qaushiq Mukherjee	India
Genesis	Genezis	Árpád Bogdán	Hungary
Girls Always Happy	柔情史	Yang Mingming	China
Hard Paint	Tinta bruta	Marcio Reolon, Filipe Matzembacher	Brazil
Horizon	Horizonti	Tinatin Kajrishvili	Georgia, Sweden
Human, Space, Time and Human	인간, 공간, 시간 그리고 인간	Kim Ki-duk	South Korea
Invasion	هجوم	Shahram Mokri	Iran
Jibril		Henrika Kull	Germany
Land		Babak Jalali	Italy, France, Netherlands, Mexico, Qatar
Lemonade	Luna de miere	Ioana Uricaru	Romania
Malambo, the Good Man	Malambo, el hombre bueno	Santiago Loza	Argentina
Marilyn		Martín Rodríguez Redondo	Argentina, Chile
The Omission	La omisión	Sebastián Schjaer	Argentina, Netherlands, Switzerland
A Paris Education	Mes provinciales	Jean-Paul Civeyrac	France
Profile		Timur Bekmambetov	United States, United Kingdom, Cyprus, Russia
River's Edge		Isao Yukisada	Japan
Shock Waves – Diary of My Mind	Ondes de choc – Journal de ma tête	Ursula Meier	Switzerland
Shock Waves – First Name: Mathieu	Ondes de choc – Prénom: Mathieu	Lionel Baier	Switzerland
Styx		Wolfgang Fischer	Germany, Austria
Sunday's Illness	La enfermedad del domingo	Ramón Salazar	Spain
Thirty Souls	Trinta Lumes	Diana Toucedo	Spain
When the Trees Fall	Koly padayut dereva	Marysia Nikitiuk	Ukraine, Poland, Republic of Macedonia
Xiao Mei		Maren Hwang	Taiwan
Yardie		Idris Elba	United Kingdom
Panorama Dokumente
Central Airport THF	Zentralflughafen THF	Karim Aïnouz	Germany, Brazil, France
Ex Shaman	Ex Pajé	Luiz Bolognesi	Brazil
Family Life	Familienleben	Rosa Hannah Ziegler	Germany
Game Girls		Alina Skrzeszewska	France, Germany
Generation Wealth		Lauren Greenfield	United States
Hotel Jugoslavija		Nicolas Wagnières	Switzerland
I See Red People	Je vois rouge	Claudia Priscilla, Bojina Panayotova	France, Bulgaria
Kinshasa Makambo		Dieudo Hamadi	Congo, France, Switzerland, Germany, Qatar, Norway
Matangi/Maya/M.I.A.		Steve Loveridge	United States, United Kingdom, Sri Lanka
Obscuro Barroco		Evangelia Kranioti	France, Greece
Partisan		Lutz Pehnert, Matthias Ehlert, Adama Ulrich	Germany
Shakedown		Leilah Weinraub	United States
Shut Up and Play the Piano		Philipp Jedicke	Germany, France, United Kingdom
The Silence of Others		Almudena Carracedo, Robert Bahar	United States, Spain
The Silk and the Flame		Jordan Schiele	United States
That Summer		Göran Hugo Olsson	Sweden, Denmark, United States
Tranny Fag	Bixa Travesty	Claudia Priscilla, Kiko Goifman	Brazil
The Trial	O processo	Maria Ramos	Brazil, Germany, Netherlands
What Comes Around	Al Gami'ya	Reem Saleh	Lebanon, Egypt, Greece, Qatar, Slovenia
When the War Comes	Až přijde válka	Jan Gebert	Czech Republic, Croatia

== Official Awards ==
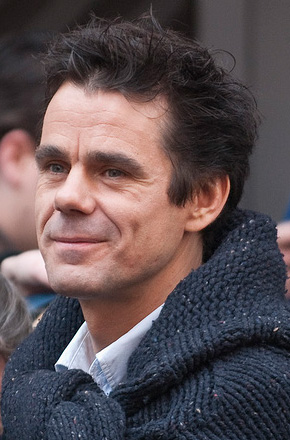
Tom Tykwer, Jury President

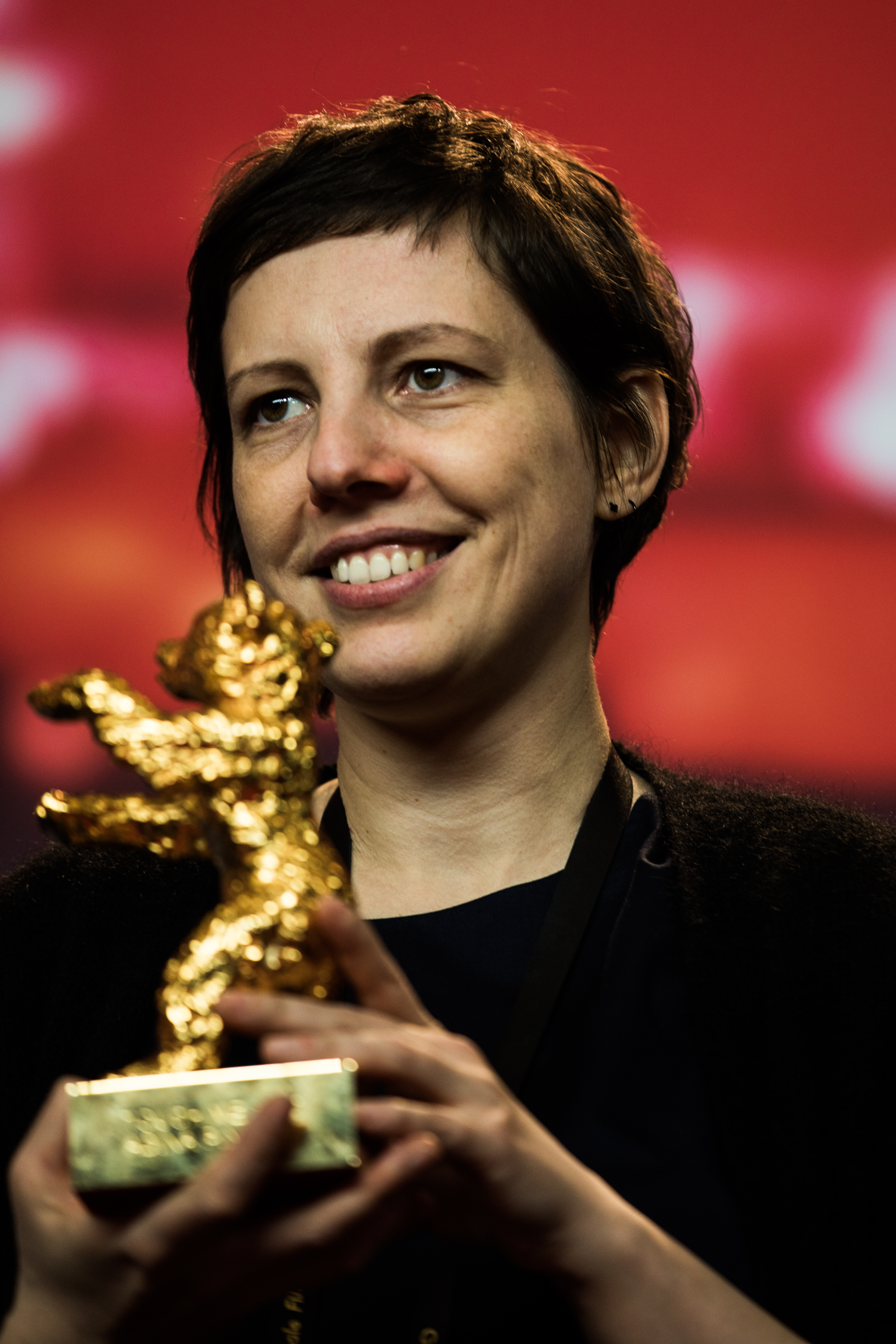
Romanian director with the Golden Bear at the 2018 Berlinale

The following prizes were awarded:

=== Main Competition ===
- Golden Bear: Touch Me Not by Adina Pintilie
- Silver Bear Grand Jury Prize: Mug by Małgorzata Szumowska
- Alfred Bauer Prize: The Heiresses by Marcelo Martinessi
- Silver Bear for Best Director: Wes Anderson for Isle of Dogs
- Silver Bear for Best Actress: Ana Brun for The Heiresses
- Silver Bear for Best Actor: Anthony Bajon for The Prayer
- Silver Bear for Best Screenplay: Alonso Ruizpalacios and Manuel Alcalá for Museum
- Silver Bear for Outstanding Artistic Contribution: Elena Okopnaya for Dovlatov (costume and production design)

=== Golden Bear for Best Short Film ===
- The Men Behind the Wall by Ines Moldavsky

=== GWFF Best First Feature Award ===
- Touch Me Not by Adina Pintilie

=== Generation KPlus ===
- Crystal Bear for Best Short Film: A Field Guide to Being a 12-Year-Old Girl by Tilda Cobham-Hervey

== Independent Awards ==
=== Prize of the Ecumenical Jury ===
- In the Aisles by Thomas Stuber
