= Mihai Radu Pricop =

Romanian politician

Mihai Radu Pricop (2 May 1950, Curtea de Argeș – 2 August 2018, Câmpulung Moldovenesc) was a Romanian senator in the 2000–2004 legislature elected in Suceava County on the lists of the PDSR party that became PSD in June 2001. Doliu în familia lui Băsescu. Radu Pricop was a member of the parliamentary friendship groups with the Federal Republic of Yugoslavia and the State of Israel. Initiated 10 legislative proposals out of which 8 laws were promulgated. Mihai Radu Pricop was a member of the Economic Commission, Industry and Services Committee, the Commission for Public Administration, Territorial Organization and Environmental Protection, and the Commission for the Privatization and Administration of State Assets.
