= Adina Pintilie =

Romanian film director and screenwriter (born 1980)

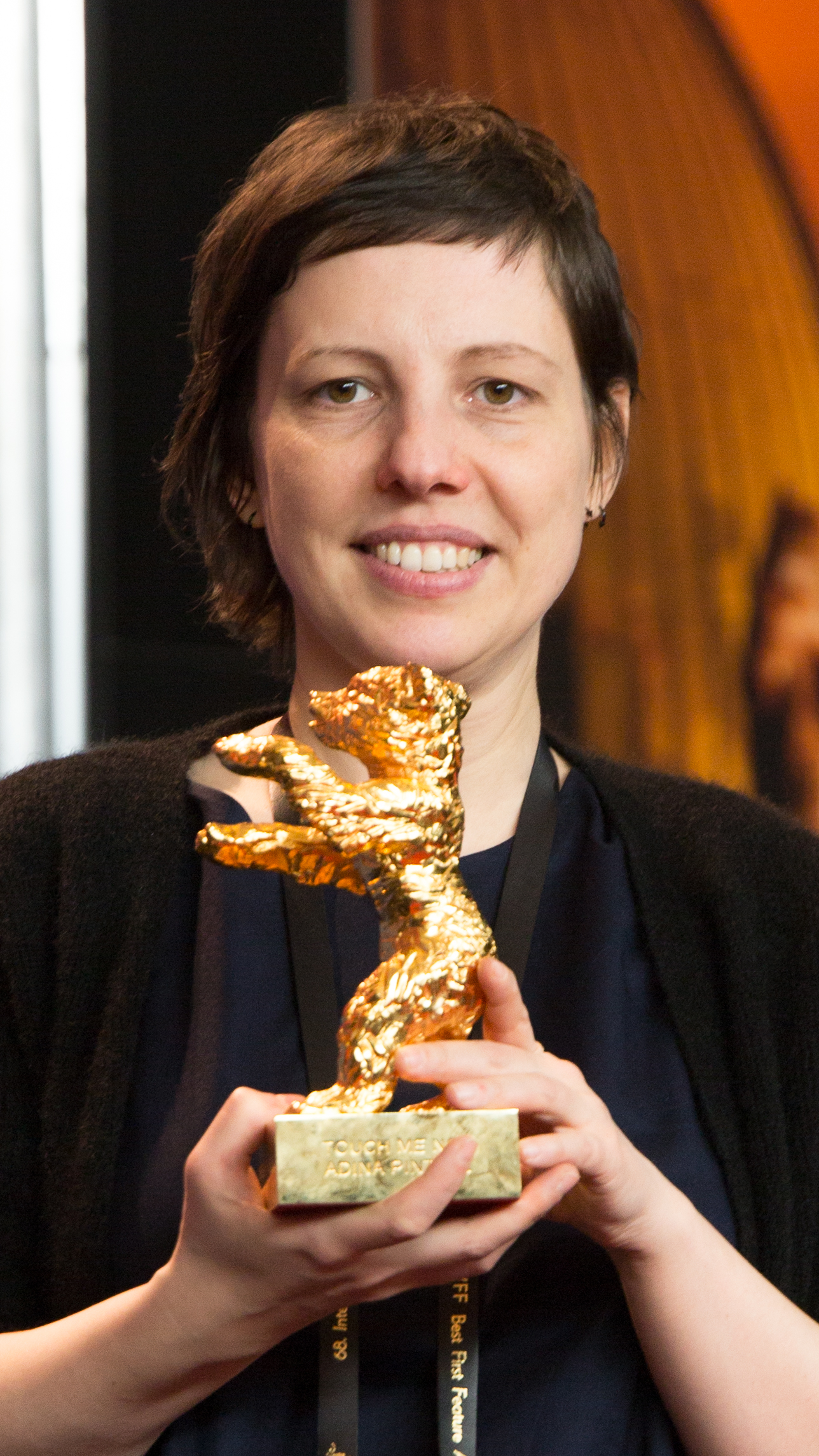
- Adina Pintilie holding the Golden Bear during the 68th Berlin International Film Festival
- Born: 12 January 1980 (age 46); Bucharest, Romania
- Education: Ion Luca Caragiale National University of Theatre and Film
- Occupations: Film director; screenwriter
- Years active: 2003–present
- Notable work: Touch Me Not
- Awards: Golden Bear (2018)

Adina Pintilie (born 12 January 1980, with the birth name Adina-Elena Pintilie) is a Romanian film director and screenwriter. She is known for her raw material work. Her decade-long creative multi-platform study on intimacy, current body politics, and the aesthetics of extended moving image creation encompasses performance, cinema, and virtual reality, and is supported by long-term partnerships and cross-disciplinary research. Her feature length debut film Touch Me Not was awarded the Golden Bear at the 68th Berlin International Film Festival as well as the GFWW Award for Best First Feature at the Berlinale 2018 and nominated at the European Film Award the same year. She also co-founded MANEKINO FILM, an independent production company based in Bucharest.

Adina Pintilie is also known for her shorter works: Don’t Get me Wrong and her short film Oxygen.

== Early life ==
Adina Pintilie, also known as Adina-Elena Pintilie (given name at birth), was born on 12 January 1980 in Romania.

She studied at the Ion Luca Caragiale National University of Theatre and Film.

== Career ==
In 2018, Pintilie got the Golden Bear award for her film Touch Me Not. The film is an experiment in fiction and film that confronts people's biases about intimacy. It is described to be a large therapy session, in which you serve as the therapist for three separate patients who are dealing with challenges connected to intimacy and human connection. Receiving lots of backlash on it for its scenes of nudity and intimacy.

== Awards ==
Her 2007 film Don't Get Me Wrong received the best female director prize at the Mexico City International Contemporary Film Festival. The film also received Golden Dove Award for Best Documentary at DOK Leipzig.

Touch Me Not, her 2018 feature film, received the Golden Bear at the 2018 Berlinale and was nominated for the European Film Academy Awards.

== Filmography ==
=== Feature films ===
Year	Film	Notes
2007	Don't Get Me Wrong	Won – Golden Barge for Best Documentary; Nominated – Gopo Award for Best Documentary; Nominated – Golden Leopard; Nominated – Free Spirit Award
2018	Touch Me Not	Won – Golden Bear
TBA	Death and the Maid	Post-production

=== Short films ===
Year	Film	Notes
2003	Ea	Short
2004	Unwatched Trains	Short
2004	Some Kind of Loneliness	Documentary short
2005	Nea Pintea... Model	Documentary short
2006	The Fear of Mr. G	Short
2006	Casino	Short
2009	Sandpit #186	Short; Nominated – Grand Jury Prize
2010	Oxygen	Documentary short Nominated – Gopo Award for Best Short Film; Nominated – Young Hope Award; Nominated – Silver Eye Award; Nominated – Tiger Award for Short Film; Nominated – Short Grand Prix
2022	You Are Another Me–A Cathedral of the Body	Short

=== Actress ===
Year	Film	Role	Notes
2018	Touch Me Not	Adina	

=== Writer ===
Year	Film	Notes
2003	Ea	Short
2004	Unwatched Trains	Short
2004	Some Kind of Loneliness	Documentary short
2007	Don't Get Me Wrong	Documentary
2009	Sandpit #186	Short
2010	Oxygen	Documentary short
2018	Touch Me Not	

=== Producer ===
Year	Film	Notes
2009	Sandpit #186	Short
2018	Touch Me Not	
