= 2022 in Romania =

- Decades: 2000s; 2010s; 2020s
- See also: Other events of 2022; History of Romania; Timeline of Romanian history; Years in Romania

Events from the year 2022 in Romania.

== Incumbents ==
- President: Klaus Iohannis
- Prime Minister: Nicolae Ciucă
- Deputy Prime Ministers: Hunor Kelemen and Sorin Grindeanu
- President of the Chamber of Deputies: Marcel Ciolacu
- President of the Senate: Florin Cîțu (until 29 June); Alina Gorghiu (since 29 June) (acting)
- President of the High Court of Cassation and Justice: Corina Corbu
- President of the Constitutional Court: Valer Dorneanu (until 11 June); Marian Enache (since 11 June)
- Ciucă Cabinet

== Ongoing events ==
- COVID-19 pandemic in Romania
  - Moldovan–Romanian collaboration during the COVID-19 pandemic

== Events ==
=== January ===
- 3 January:
  - After the Alliance for the Union of Romanians (AUR) criticized government plans for introduction of sex education and the history of the Holocaust in the school curriculum, PNL deputy Alexandru Muraru demanded for the party's outlawing, submitting penal complaints on the party's then-co-presidents, George Simion and Claudiu Târziu.
  - Prime minister Nicolae Ciucă names Dragoș-Cristian Vlad to head the Authority for the Digitisation of Romania (Romanian: Autoritatea pentru Digitalizarea României).
- 4 January:
  - The Treaty between Romania and the Kingdom of Thailand regarding the transfer of sentenced persons and cooperation in applying sentences (Romanian: Tratatul între România și Regatul Thailandei privind transferarea persoanelor condamnate și cooperarea în executarea pedepselor), that was signed in Romanian, Thai and English on 25 September 2019 in New York, is ratified.
  - The Agreement for the Termination of Bilateral Investment Treaties between the Member States of the European Union is ratified.
- 11 January – COVID-19 pandemic: The National Institute of Public Health (INSP) announces that all criteria for nationwide community transmission of the Omicron variant were met.
- 12 January – The Alliance of Liberals and Democrats (ALDE) begins negotiations with the PNL, the party from which it split in 2014, for a potential merge between the two parties.
- 13 January:
  - A police car hits two girls aged 11 and 13, respectively, who were crossing a street in Sector 1 of Bucharest. The 13-year-old died.
  - COVID-19 pandemic: The National Committee for Emergency Situations (CNSU) adopts Decision no. 3/2022, which lets schools operate in-person—regardless of their vaccination rate and the locality's incidence rate—as long as the grade of occupation of hospital beds reserved for COVID-19 patients (in the school's county) stays below 75%.
  - A law that marks the National Day of Cancer Survivors (Romanian: Ziua Națională a Supraviețuitorilor de Cancer) on the first Sunday of each June is promulgated by president Klaus Iohannis.
  - The law making the year 2022 the "Smaranda Brăescu Year" (Romanian: Anul Smaranda Brăescu) is promulgated by the president. It was initiated by Nicolae Ciucă.
- 14 January – The president promulgates a law marking the National Reading Day (Romanian: Ziua națională a lecturii) on 15 February, meant for publicly encouraging reading.
- 20 January – General strike at Societatea de Transport București (STB) leads to metro crowding and traffic jam in Bucharest, while the STB fleet of buses, trolleybuses and trams remains unused. The strike continued despite being suspended by the Bucharest Court.
- 22 January – COVID-19 pandemic: The total number of cases nationwide exceeds 2 million.
- 26 January:
  - COVID-19 pandemic: The vaccination campaign begins for the population aged 5–11.
  - The Romanian Supreme Council of National Defence (CSAT) met to discuss the security situation in the eastern flank of NATO, amid Russian plans for a full-scale invasion of Ukraine, that would begin a month later.
- 27 January – President Klaus Iohannis receives French minister of the Armed Forces, Florence Parly, at Cotroceni Palace.
- 28 January – Marcel Boloș was sworn in as Minister of Digitalisation for the Ciucă Cabinet. He succeeded Florin Roman, who resigned over a month prior.

=== February ===
- 1 February:
  - The 2022 Romanian census begins, after being initially postponed from 2021 due to the COVID-19 pandemic.
  - The Senate votes on the composition of its standing bureau and elects Tiberiu Horațiu Gorun as secretary general of the Senate.
  - Octavian-Daniel Chelemen becomes head of the ANOFM, replacing Maria Mareș, who had been its head since October 2020.
  - Teodosie Gabriel Marinov becomes governor of the Danube Delta Biosphere Reserve Administration (Romanian: Administrația Rezervației Biosferei Delta Dunării), replacing Atena-Adriana Groza.
- 3 February – COVID-19 pandemic: The CNSU decides to prolong the state of alert for 30 days, effective on 7 February.
- 4 February:
  - President Klaus Iohannis recalls several ambassadors and permanent representatives: Ion Jinga (United Nations), Răzvan-Victor Rusu (permanent representative at the Council of Europe), Adrian Cosmin Viverița (permanent representative to United Nations Office at Geneva), Cristian-Leon Țurcanu (Ukraine), Daniel Ioniță (Moldova), Iulian Buga (Sweden), Sorin Vasile Moldovan (Turkmenistan), Florin Marius Tacu (Singapore), Adrian Măcelaru (UAE and Bahrain) and Mihail Constantin Coman (Oman).
  - Mayor of Iași Mihai Chirica is suspended for 60 days after the National Anticorruption Directorate has started prosecuting him. Deputy mayor Daniel Juravle is granted mayor status.
- 7 February – COVID-19 pandemic: The state of alert is prolonged for 30 days.
- 9 February:
  - The president turns the Consulate of Romania in Castellón into a Consulate General and moves its headquarters to Valencia.
  - The board of directors of the TVR approved relaunching TVR Info and TVR Cultural.
- 10 February:
  - The National Bank of Romania raises is monetary policy key interest rate from 2% to 2.5% per annum.
  - The government replaces the prefects of Botoșani (Sorin Cornilă replacing Nechifor Dan), Caraș-Severin (Ioan Dragomir replacing Cristian Gâfu), Teleorman (Haralambie Epure replacing Emilia Paraschivescu) and Vâlcea (Mihai Oprea replacing Sebastian Fârtat).
- 11 February: The Iași Court (Romanian: Tribunalul Iași) reverts Mihai Chirica's suspension from being mayor of Iași.
- 21 February – The Chamber of Deputies (Romania) votes on a bill for terminating the Section for Investigating Criminal Offences within the Judiciary (Romanian: Secția pentru Investigarea Infracțiunilor din Justiție, SIIJ) with 250 votes in favour, 90 against and an abstention.
- 28 February – The Senate votes on the bill that was approved by the Chamber of Deputies for dismantling the SIIJ with 86 votes in favour, 37 against and one abstention. USR and AUR proposed amendments that were rejected.

=== March ===
- 2 March – Christine Lambrecht, the German minister of defence, meets with Vasile Dîncu, her Romanian counterpart, at the 57th Air Base "Mihail Kogălniceanu".
- 3 March – President of the European Commission, Ursula von der Leyen, and United Nations High Commissioner for Refugees Filippo Grandi pay president Klaus Iohannis a visit at Cotroceni Palace.
- 6 March – President of Romania Klaus Iohannis, Romanian prime minister Nicolae Ciucă and the French minister of the armed forces, Florence Parly, meet at the 57th Air Base "Mihail Kogălniceanu".
- 7 March – The Canadian minister of foreign affairs, Mélanie Joly, meets with president of Romania Klaus Iohannis and Romanian foreign minister Bogdan Aurescu in Bucharest, after being invited by the latter.
- 9 March:
  - The justices of the Constitutional Court unaninmously reject the objections of unconstitutionality of USR, AUR and PSD regarding the law for dismantling the SIIJ, thus declaring it constitutional.
  - COVID-19 pandemic: The state of alert, initially decreed in May 2020 due to the pandemic, was lifted.

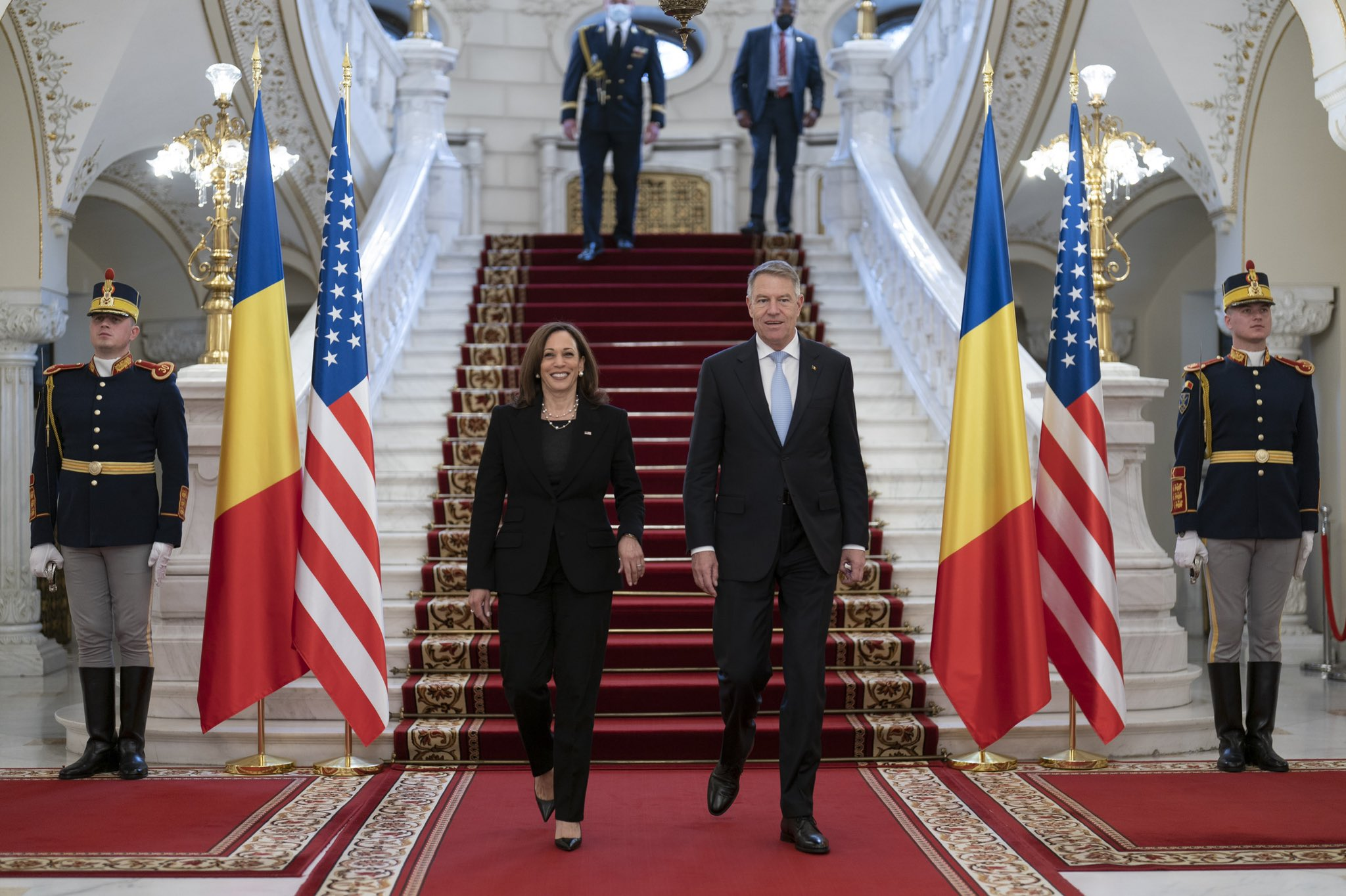
Kamala Harris and Klaus Iohannis at Cotroceni Palace.

- 11 March:
  - United States vice president Kamala Harris meets with president Klaus Iohannis.
  - President Klaus Iohannis promulgates the law meant to dismantle the Section for Investigating Criminal Offences within the Judiciary.
- 30 March – Education in Romania – Education minister, Sorin Cîmpeanu, announces the change of the structure of pre-university year school years into 5 modules and 5 vacations, thus scrapping semesters.

=== April ===
- 5 April – The president promulgates a law initiated by liberal members of parliament declaring Vasile Lucaciu a "Hero of the Romanian Nation" (Romanian: Erou al Națiunii Române).
- 10 April – Prime minister Nicolae Ciucă is elected president of the National Liberal Party.
- 11 April – The president promulgates a law marking the day of 11 April the "Day of financial literacy" (Romanian: Ziua educației financiare).
- 21 April – The first expressway-type road opens in Romania, a 16 km long section of the DEx12 expressway, between Slatina and Balș.
- 29 April – 2022 cyberattacks on Romania: At 04:05 EEST, a DDOS attack is launched against www.mapn.ro, the website of the Ministry of National Defence (Romanian: Ministerul Apărării Naționale, MApN). As of 09:24 EEST, the websites of the Government (Romanian: Guvernul României) – gov.ro, Ministry of National Defence – mapn.ro, Border Police (Romanian: Poliția de Frontieră Română) – politiadefrontiera.ro and CFR Călători – cfrcalatori.ro had been taken down by DDOS attacks, with the website of the Romanian Government being restored in the meantime. As of 10:20 EEST, CFR Călători has issued alternative means of purchasing train tickets online. At 19:30 EEST, the website of the Social Democratic Party (PSD) – psd.ro had been also taken down. Behind the attack was believed to be a pro-Kremlin hacking group.

=== May ===
- 25 May – The Romanian version of Euronews is launched.

=== June ===
- 5 June – The National Day of Cancer Survivors (Romanian: Ziua Națională a Supraviețuitorilor de Cancer) is marked for the first time. Victoria Palace is lighten up for two hours, between 21:00 EEST and 23:00 EEST with a yellow water lily.
- 11 June – Marian Enache was elected president of the Constitutional Court for a three-year term.
- 21 June – The president promulgates a law marking the "Day of the Ie" (Romanian: Ziua Iei) on 24 June.
- 22 June – TVR Info is relaunched at 7:00 EEST.
- 23 June – Adrian Chesnoiu resigns from his position of minister of agriculture and suspends himself from the Social Democratic Party.
- 26 June – David Popovici and Robert Glință are welcomed at the Henri Coandă International Airport by Eduard Novak, the minister of sport, Camelia Potec and Mihai Covaliu, president of the Romanian Olympic and Sports Committee. Eduard Novak handed Popovici a check worth €200,000 from the government.
- 29 June – Florin Cîțu resigns from being president of the senate. Alina Gorghiu replaces him as acting president.

=== July ===
- 1 July – The emergency ordinance compensating fuel providers with 25 bani/litre for selling fuel costing 50 bani/litre less than the normal price between 1 July and 30 September enters force.
- 8 July – Petre Daea becomes minister of agriculture.
- 14 July – The president promulgates a law that establishes the "National day of the sport with the oval ball" (Romanian: Ziua națională a sportului cu balonul oval) on 4 May, that would be marked by the Romanian Rugby Federation.
- 20 July – President Klaus Iohannis decorates David Popovici with the Order of the Star of Romania in the grade of the Knight and his coach, Adrian Rădulescu, with the National Order of Merit in the grade of the Knight.
- 21 July – The president promulgates a law establishing the National Museum of the Anticommunist Revolution from December 1989 (Romanian: Muzeul Național al Revoluției Anticomuniste din Decembrie 1989), that is set to be headquartered in Timișoara, subordinated to the Ministry of Culture.

=== August ===
- 10 August – Declic, an association, organizes a protest in Victory Square named "10 August – We won't forgive and we won't forget" (Romanian: 10 august - Nu uităm și nu iertăm) to mark four years since a protest on 10 August 2018 and urges the investigation on the violence from that protest to be sped up. Prime minister Nicolae Ciucă makes remarks on the protest's fourth year anniversary, saying that the Coalition would never allow protests to degenerate to such violence and that the government would be providing all that is necessary for the case investigating the protests on 10 August 2018 to be concluded.
- 22 August – Robert Negoiță, mayor of Sector 3 and Sorin Cîmpeanu, the minister of education, are amused by a "Puie Monta" message they see inside a preschool they had just inaugurated.
- 28 August – Sorin Cîmpeanu tells Digi24 that the "Puie Monta" message inside the preschool was inappropriate and that nobody knows who made it.

=== September ===
- 26 September – Romanian journalist Emilia Șercan reveals that education minister Sorin Cîmpeanu plagiarised in a 2006 paper authored by him.
- 29 September – Education minister Sorin Cîmpeanu announces his resignation on Facebook.

=== October ===
- 3 October – Ligia Deca takes her oath into office as the minister of education succeeding and replacing Sorin Cîmpeanu.

=== November ===
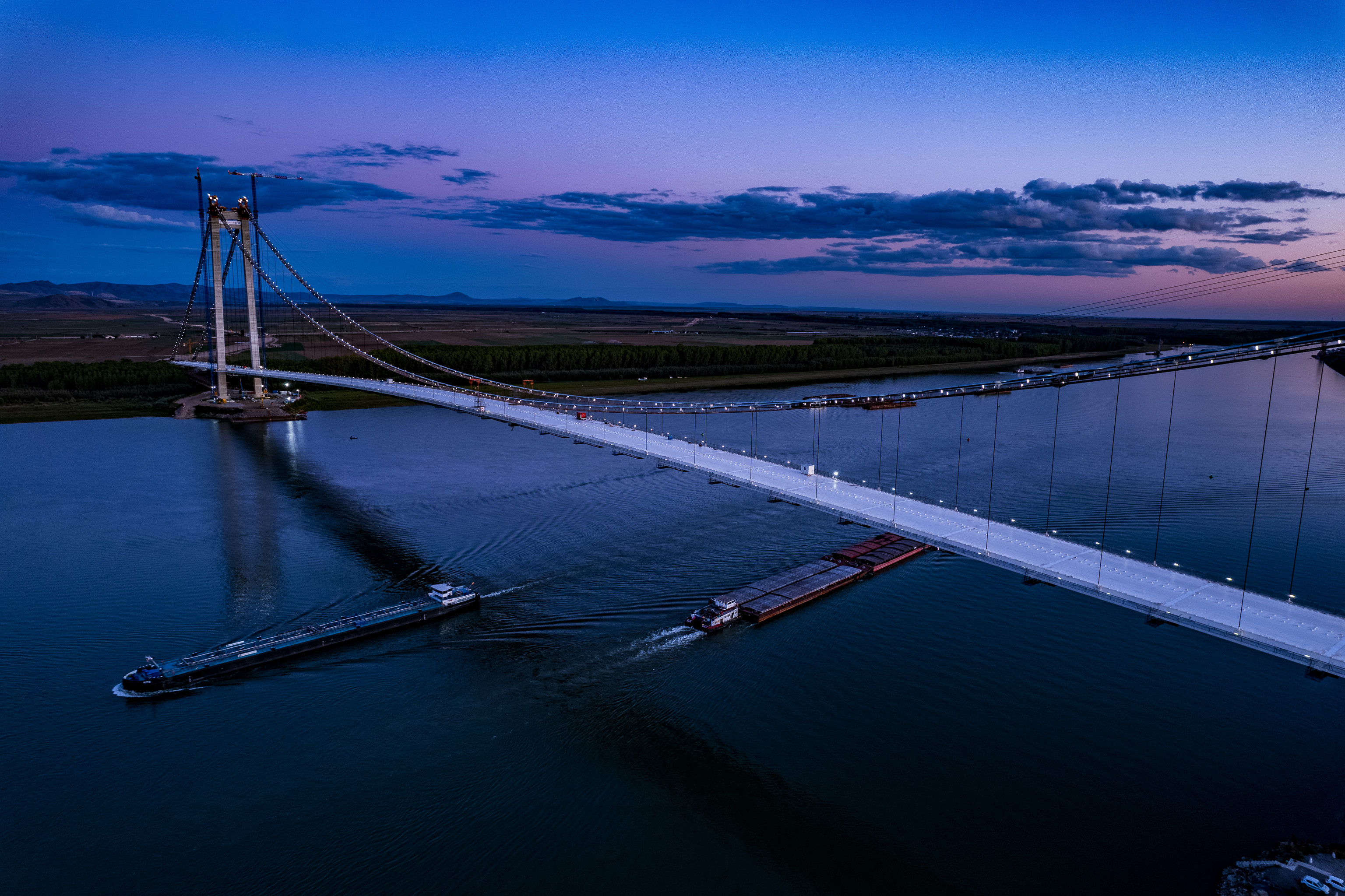
The Brăila Bridge, pictured in September 2022.

- 2 November – Hungarian People's Party of Transylvania and Hungarian Civic Party merge into one party. The Hungarian Alliance of Transylvania is founded.
- 15 November – The Bucharest Court of Appeal (Romanian: Curtea de Apel București) extends the deadline for the Brăila Bridge by 193 days and forces the Romanian CNAIR (Romanian: Compania Națională de Administrare a Infrastructurii Rutiere) to pay 28,808,369.4 Romanian lei to Italian contractor Webuild for delays. It also needs to pay Webuild a sum worth 576,167.4 lei for the trial.
- 28–30 November – NATO foreign ministers meet in Bucharest.

=== December ===
- 5 December – Gemma Webb is appointed head of the RetuRO Directorate (Romanian: Directoratul RetuRO), a government recycling mechanism.
- 8 December – Over 1300 negative comments are written on the Facebook page of Austrian embassy in Romania, following the opposition of Austrian officials on the same day to greenlight Romania into entering the Schengen Area.
- 9 December – The ambassador of Romania in Austria, Emil Hurezeanu, was summoned by the Ministry of Foreign Affairs for consultations, following the opposition of Romania's bid to enter the Schengen Area on December 8 from the Austrian minister of home affairs. The Ministry of Foreign Affairs mentioned in a press statement that the decision to summon Hurezeanu was taken as an act of disproval of the conduct of Austrian diplomacy.
- 12 December – The president of Switzerland, Ignazio Cassis, pays an official visit in Romania.
- 13 December – President Klaus Iohannis meets with European Union ambassadors in Romania, for an annual meeting with them, at the Athénée Palace Hilton hotel, starting at 11:00 EET. Among the tackled topics are the extension of the European Union, the Russian invasion of Ukraine, the problems faced by the Republic of Moldova and the Schengen Area situation of Romania. The ambassador of Austria in Romania, Adelheid Folie, is absent from the meeting. Instead, a deputy of the Austrian embassy in Romania, Georg Oberreiter, shows up at the talks. The Austrian chargé d'affaires, the aforementioned deputy appointed by her, tells the Romanian press that she didn't make it to the meeting due to being on a long vacation. Later that day, a press release of the Austrian embassy signed by Oberreiter mentions that Folie would be returning to work after Christmas, as she is undergoing a surgery planned long before the meeting with EU ambassadors.
- 14 December:
  - Ambassador of Turkey in Romania, Füsun Aramaz, pays Romanian minister of foreign affairs, Bogdan Aurescu, a visit, as her ambassador term comes to an end.
  - The Parliament of Romania jointly approves the government's state budget for 2023.
- 15 December – Subsection 1, Sibiu - Boița, of the Sibiu - Pitești section of the A1 motorway is opened to the traffic on 15:00 EET. It is 13.17 kilometres long.
- 17 December – Azerbaijan, Georgia, Hungary and Romania sign a green energy agreement at Cotroceni Palace, with the presence of Ursula von der Leyen, President of the European Commission.
- 19–20 December – President of the European Parliament, Roberta Metsola, goes on an official visit in Bucharest.
- 20 December – President of Romania Klaus Iohannis welcomes President of Portugal, Marcelo Rebelo de Sousa, at the Instruction Battalion "Olt" 1 (Romanian: Batalionul de Instrucție 1 "Olt") of Caracal with military honours.
- 28 December – The Government assents 35 localities and places to local interest resort status (Romanian: stațiune turistică de interes local).
- 29 December – Authorities from the Romanian DIICOT detain Internet personality and former kickboxer Andrew Tate, his brother Tristan, and two other individuals on charges relating to human trafficking and forming an organised crime group.
- 30 December:
  - The Bucharest Court (Romanian: Tribunalul București) grants the DIICOT a 30 day preventive arrest period for the Tate brothers.
  - 2022 Romanian census: The National Institute of Statistics reveals, in a press statement, preliminary data on Romania's population on the 1st of December 2021: 19,053,815 inhabitants; with 51.5% females and 48.5% males. It is a population decline from the previous census, the 2011 one.

== Deaths ==
=== January ===
- 8 January – Attila Kelemen, Romanian politician (born 1948).

=== February ===
- 23 February – Ion Adrian Zare, 62, Romanian football player (Bihor Oradea, Siófok, national team) and manager.

=== March ===
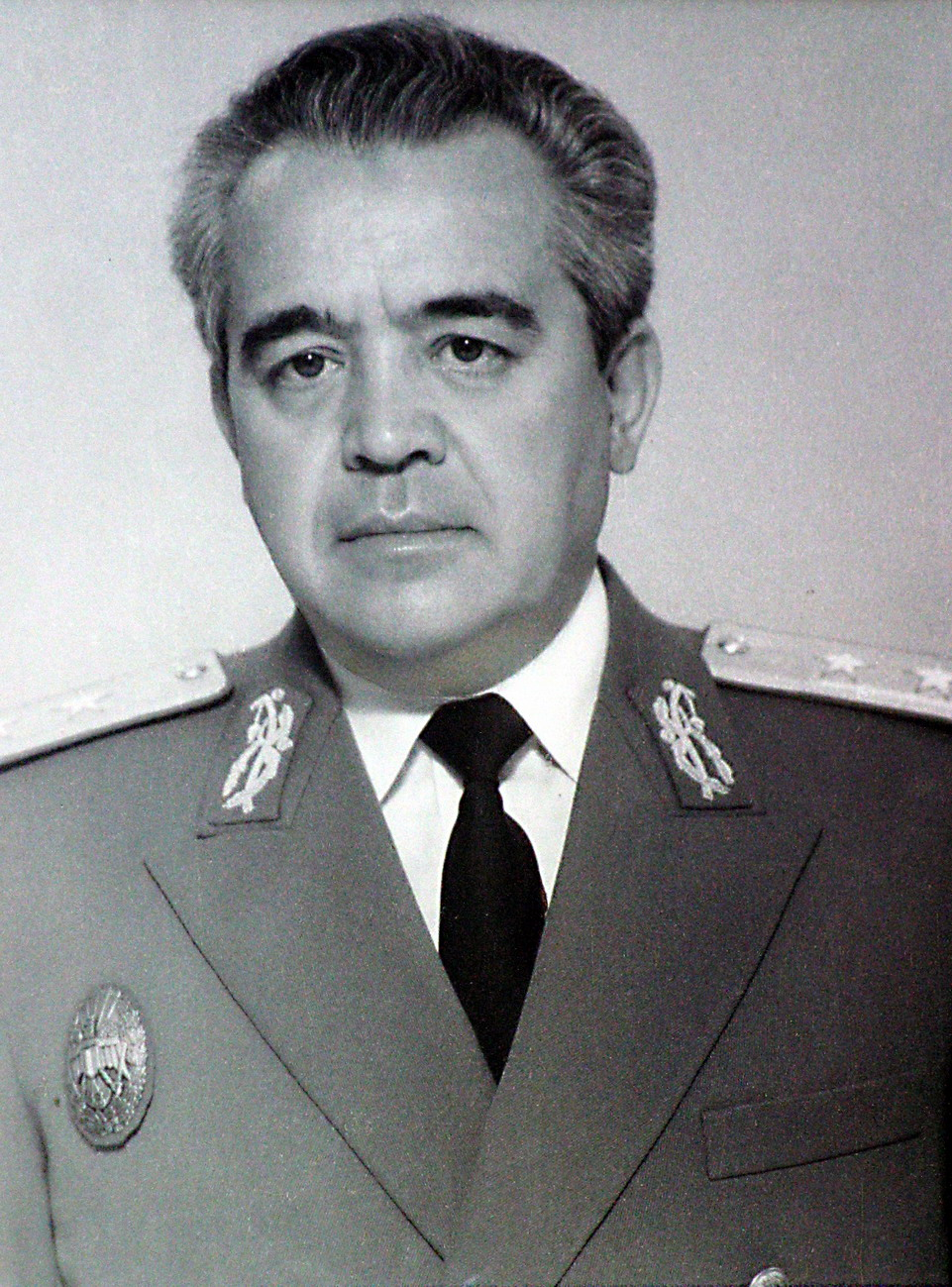
Niculae Spiroiu

- 28 March – Mircea Tomuș, 88, Romanian writer and literary historian.
- 31 March – Niculae Spiroiu, 85, Romanian engineer, military general and politician, minister of defense (1991–1994).

=== April ===
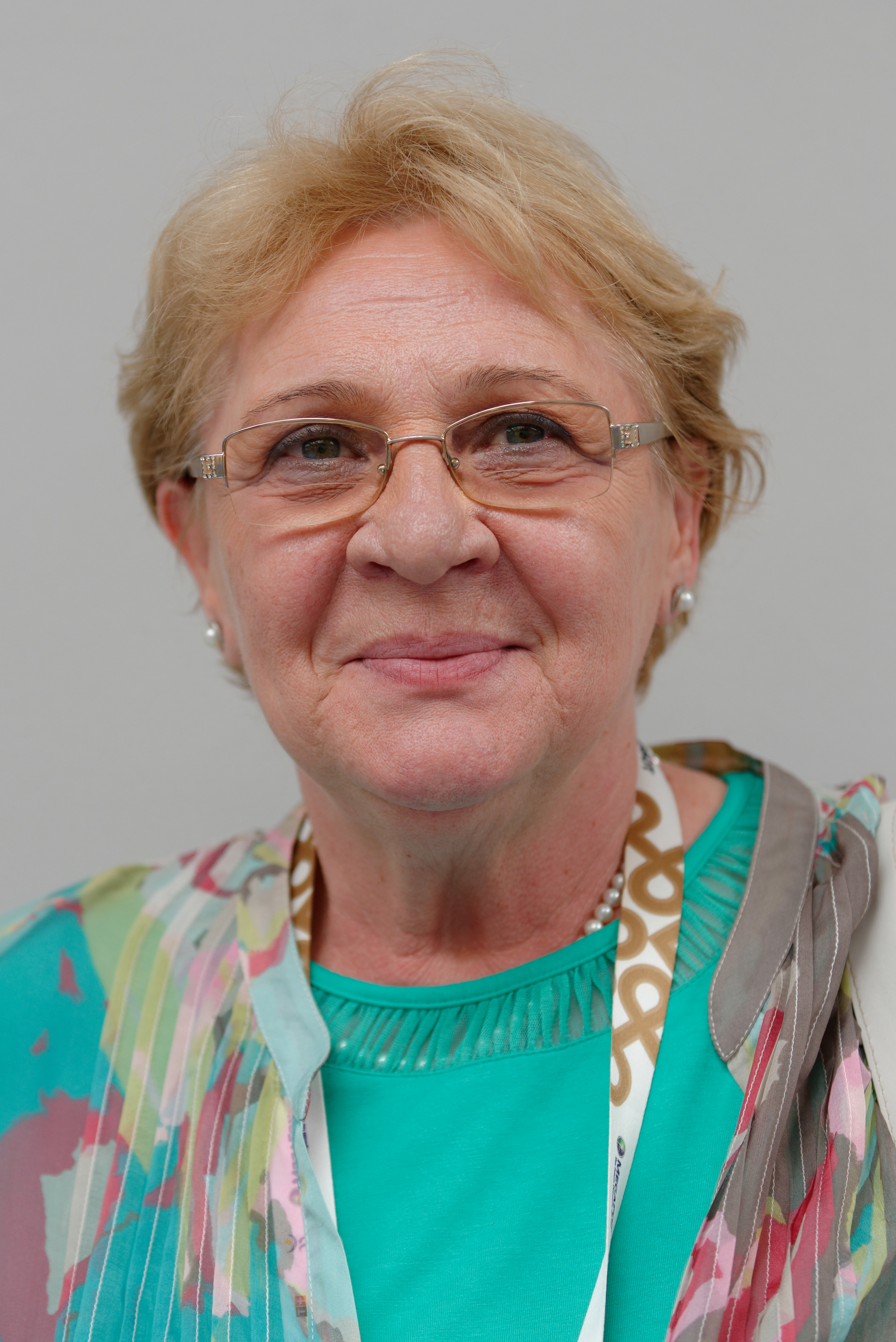
Ana Pascu

- 6 April – Ana Pascu, 77, Romanian fencer, Olympic bronze medallist (1968, 1972).
- 12 April – Traian Stănescu, 82, Romanian actor (Răscoala, Trandafirul galben, The Silver Mask).

=== May ===
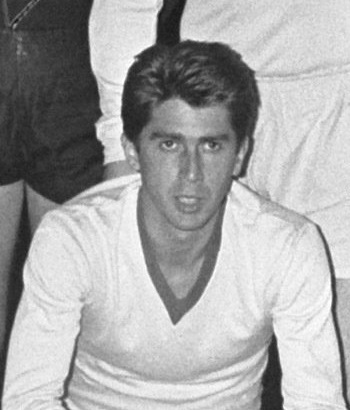
Virgil Dridea

- 7 May – Simion Mironaș, 56, Romanian footballer (CSM Suceava, Gloria Bistrița, Olimpia Satu Mare).
- 15 May – Șerban Valeca, 65, Romanian engineer and politician, deputy (2000) and senator (2008–2020).
- 18 May – Henry Mavrodin, 84, Romanian painter, designer and essayist.
- 29 May – Virgil Dridea, 81, Romanian football player (Petrolul Ploiești) and manager (Plopeni, Dacia Unirea Brăila).

=== June ===
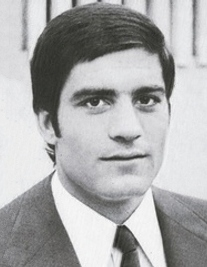
Costică Dafinoiu

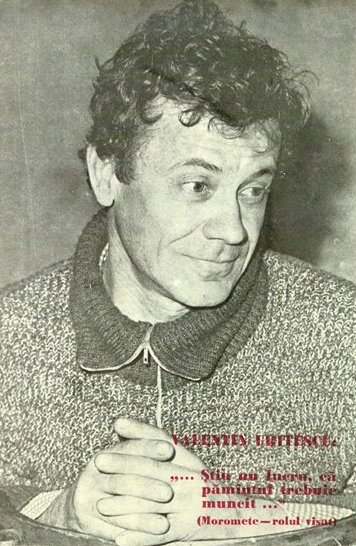
Valentin Uritescu

- 8 June – Costică Dafinoiu, 68, Romanian boxer, Olympic bronze medallist (1976).
- 17 June – Valentin Uritescu, 81, Romanian actor (The Conjugal Bed, The Last Assault, Sand Cliffs).
- 18 June – Constantin Eftimescu, 70, Romanian footballer (Dinamo București, Victoria București, Delta Tulcea).
- 23 June – Leluț Vasilescu, 66, Romanian drummer.

=== July ===
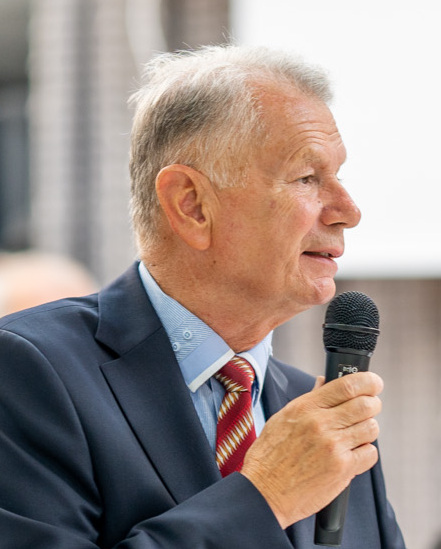
Silvian Ciupercă

- 1 July – Peter Imre, 60, Romanian businessman.
- 2 July – Roland Stănescu, 32, Romanian footballer (Petrolul Ploiești, FC Argeș).
- 6 July – Mihăiță Nițulescu, 53, Romanian boxer.
- 31 July – Silvian Ciupercă, 73, Romanian politician, former mayor of Țăndărei (1996–2000), deputy (2000–2004) and former president of the county council of Ialomița (2004-2015).

=== August ===
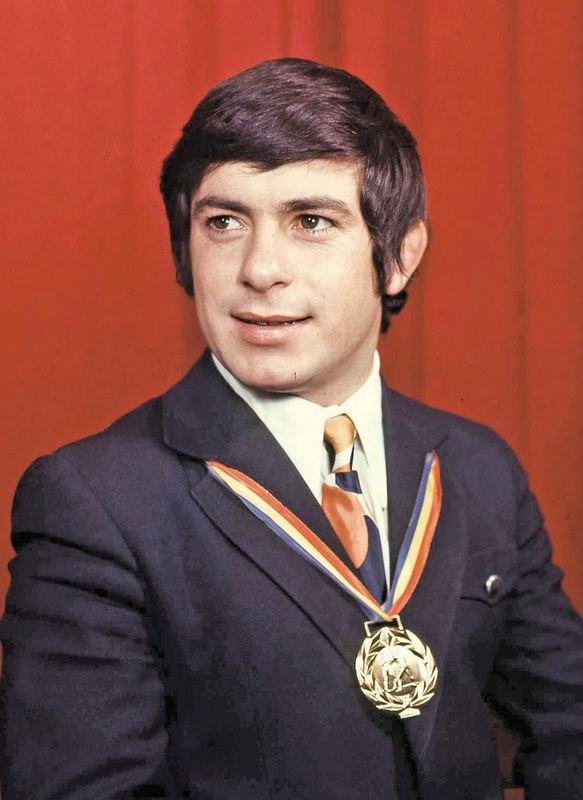
Gheorghe Berceanu

- 27 August – Iulian-Gabriel Bîrsan, 65, Romanian engineer and politician.
- 30 August – Gheorghe Berceanu, 72, Romanian Greco-Roman wrestler.

=== September ===
- 12 September – Radu Ciuceanu, 94, Romanian historian and politician.

=== October ===
- 14 October – Mariana Nicolesco, 73, Romanian operatic soprano.

=== December ===
- 19 December – Mircea Dușa, 67, Romanian economist and politician, Minister of National Defense from 2012 to 2015.

== See also ==
- 2022 in the European Union
- 2022 in Europe
- Romania in the Eurovision Song Contest 2022
- Romania at the 2022 Winter Olympics
- Romania at the 2022 Winter Paralympics
