= 2026 in Romania =

- Decades: 2000s; 2010s; 2020s
- See also: Other events of 2026; History of Romania; Timeline of Romanian history; Years in Romania

Events from the year 2026 in Romania.

== Incumbents ==
- President: Nicușor Dan
- Prime Minister: Ilie Bolojan (until 20 October); Luca Niculescu (since 20 October)

== Events ==
=== January ===
- 27 January – A minibus originating from Greece crashes along DN6 in Timiș County, killing seven people.

=== March ===
- 11 March – Romania authorizes the United States to use its air bases to refuel aircraft and deploy monitoring and satellite communications equipment in support of military operations related to the Iran war, following approval by the Romanian parliament and the Supreme Council of National Defence.
- 12 March – Ukraine and Romania sign a strategic partnership agreement in the defense and energy sectors.
- 31 March – The Sector 6 Court of Bucharest and the Bucharest Tribunal rule that Arian Mirzarafie-Ahi, a transgender man, double citizen of Romania and the United Kingdom, has the right to be recognised as male in identity documents issued by the Romanian government.

=== April ===
- 20 April – Gheorghe Hagi becomes the Romania national football team's head coach, on a four-year contract.
- 21 April – Three Dacian artefacts, the Helmet of Coțofenești and two golden bracelets arrive in Romania and are shown to the press, after suspects in the 2025 Drents Museum heist returned those three out of four artefacts, on 2 April.

=== May ===
- 5 May – Prime minister Ilie Bolojan loses a no-confidence vote filed in parliament by PSD and AUR.
- 16 May – Romania's Alexandra Căpitănescu finishes third at Eurovision 2026 in Austria with the single "Choke Me".
- 27 May – A petition signed by over 100 thousand people, urging the legal recognition of unmarried couples by creating a civil partnership framework, is submitted to the Chamber of Deputies.
- 29 May – A Russian drone violates Romanian airspace during a Russian strike on Izmail, Ukraine, and hits a block of flats in Galați, injuring two people. In response, the Romanian government expels the Russian consul to Constanța and closes the consulate.
- 30 May – President Dan awards former gymnast Nadia Comăneci the Order of the Star of Romania, Grand Cross grade, marking 50 years from her getting the first perfect 10 in gymnastics at the 1976 Summer Olympics.

=== June ===
- 3 June – Healthcare union Sanitas organises a protest in Bucharest against a bill which they claim would lower their salaries and reduce their rights. According to the union, about 15,000 people participate.
- 4 June – President Dan nominates MEP and presidential advisor Eugen Tomac as prime minister.
- 5 June – A stray Ukrainian naval drone explodes in the port of Constanța, prompting the evacuation of more than 1,300 people.
- 14 June – President Dan nominates Adrian Veștea as prime minister after Eugen Tomac fails to win support from the Chamber of Deputies.
- 22 June – The Chamber of Deputies rejects the nomination of a new government headed by Adrian Veștea as prime minister.

=== September ===
- 9–26 September – 2026 Men's European Volleyball Championship in Bulgaria, Finland, Italy and Romania.

=== October ===
- 5 October – President Dan nominates Luca Niculescu as prime minister.
- 19 October – A student and a teacher are injured in a stabbing at a school in Bistrița, Bistrița-Năsăud County.
- 20 October – Luca Niculescu is inaugurated as prime minister after his nomination is approved by parliament.
- 22 October – A machete attack at a high school in Pitești, Argeș County, results in injuries to two students.

=== November ===
- 5 November – Two passenger aircraft are searched upon landing in Bucharest after being subjected to bomb threats that are subsequently found to be false.
- 18 November – A magnitude 5.7 earthquake hits Covasna County, injuring two people.

=== Scheduled and expected events ===
- 3–20 December – 2026 European Women's Handball Championship in Czech Republic, Poland, Romania, Slovakia and Turkey.

== Art and entertainment ==
- List of Romanian films of 2026
- List of 2026 box office number-one films in Romania
- List of Romanian submissions for the Academy Award for Best International Feature Film

== Deaths ==
- 11 January – Eugen Pojoni, 80, footballer (Viitorul București, Crișul Oradea, UTA Arad).
- 1 March – Vasile Constantin Mao, 88, rugby union coach and academic.
- 3 March – Zsolt Kerestely, 91, composer and conductor.
- 7 April – Mircea Lucescu, 80, football player (Dinamo București, national team) and manager (Shakhtar Donetsk, national team).
- 9 May – Ioan Isaiu, 56, actor.
- 27 May – Ilie Ciocan, 112, supercentenarian and World War II veteran.
- 7 June – Maria Haiduc, 86, folk singer.
- 10 June – Petru Cadar, 77, footballer (SR Brașov).
- 11 June – Memiş Selciuc, 47, Romanian-Turkish saxophonist.
- 30 June – Radu Mărginean, 43, footballer (UTA Arad, Bihor Oradea, CFR Cluj, Gloria Bistrița).
- 8 July – Gabriel Mureșan, 44, footballer (CFR Cluj, ASA Târgu Mureș, national team) and mayor of Apold (since 2020).
- 13 August – Dumitru Marcu, 76, footballer (national team) and manager (Jiul Petroșani).
- 20 August – Ileana Cotrubaș, 87, opera singer.
- 28 August – Nicolae Ungureanu, 69, footballer (CS Universitatea Craiova, national team).
- 29 September – Ionel Haiduc, 89, chemist, president of the Romanian Academy (2006–2014).
- 5 October – Ilie Datcu, 89, footballer (CS Dinamo București).

== See also ==
- 2026 in the European Union
- 2026 in Europe
