= 2025 in Romania =

- Decades: 2000s; 2010s; 2020s
- See also: Other events of 2025; History of Romania; Timeline of Romanian history; Years in Romania

Events from the year 2025 in Romania.

== Incumbents ==
- President: Klaus Iohannis (until 12 February); Ilie Bolojan (acting, until 26 May); Nicușor Dan (since 26 May)
- Prime Minister: Marcel Ciolacu (until 6 May); Cătălin Predoiu (acting, since 6 May); Ilie Bolojan (since 23 June)
- Deputy Prime Ministers: Marian Neacșu and Cătălin Predoiu (until 6 May)
- President of the Chamber of Deputies: Ciprian-Constantin Șerban
- President of the Senate: Ilie Bolojan (until 12 February); Mircea Abrudean (since 12 February)
- President of the High Court of Cassation and Justice: Corina Corbu
- President of the Constitutional Court: Marian Enache
- Second Ciolacu cabinet (until 23 June); Bolojan cabinet (since 23 June)

== Events ==
=== January ===
- 1 January – Romania and Bulgaria fully join the Schengen Area.
- 25 January – The Dacian-era Helmet of Coțofenești, on loan from the National History Museum of Romania, is stolen along with three other gold artifacts from the Drents Museum in Assen, the Netherlands by thieves who break into the museum using explosives.

=== February ===
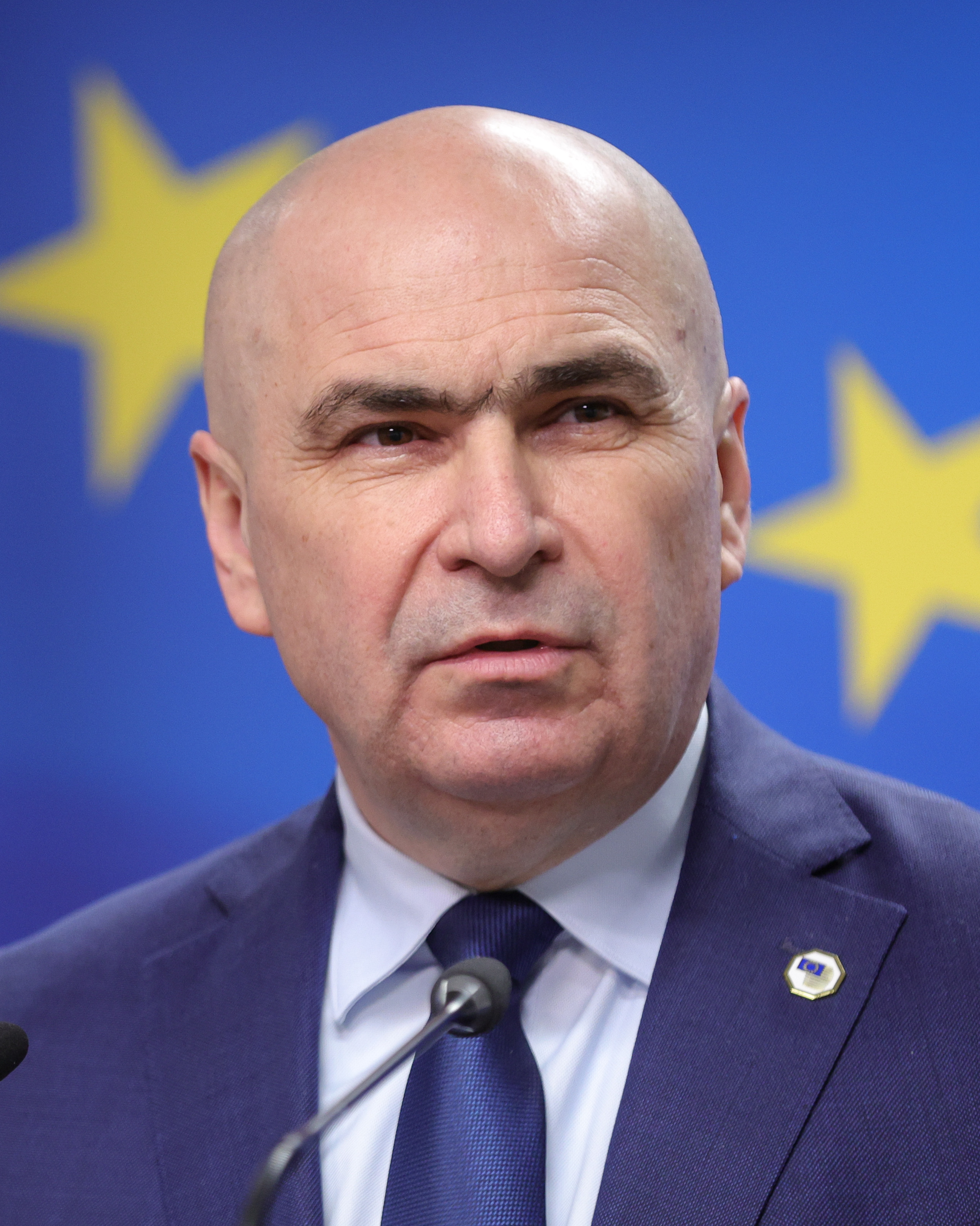
Ilie Bolojan became acting president on 12 February

- 10 February – Klaus Iohannis resigns as President of Romania effective 12 February amid criticism over his staying in office amid the 2025 Romanian presidential election.
- 12 February – Senate President Ilie Bolojan becomes acting President of Romania following Klaus Iohannis' resignation.
- 19 February – Two freight trains collide in Olt County, killing a conductor.
- 22 February – French fugitive Mohamed Amra, who fled France following a jailbreak that left two prison guards dead in May 2024, is arrested in Bucharest.
- 25 February – Fugitive Mohamed Amra is extradited to France.
- 26 February – Călin Georgescu is detained by police on his way to register for the 2025 Romanian presidential election and charged with a series of offenses including "incitement to actions against the constitutional order".
- 27 February – UK-US influencer Andrew Tate and his brother Tristan, who are subject to a travel ban pending investigations into rape and human trafficking charges, are confirmed to have left Romania for the United States.

=== March ===
- 1 March – Tens of thousands gather at an AUR protest in Bucharest in support of Călin Georgescu and against the annulment of the 2024 Romanian presidential election.
- 9 March – The Central Electoral Bureau rejects Călin Georgescu's candidacy for the 2025 Romanian presidential election, citing his failure to comply with electoral regulations that contributed to the annulment of the 2024 Romanian presidential election.
- 15 March – The Central Electoral Bureau rejects Diana Șoșoacă's candidacy for the 2025 Romanian presidential election, becoming the second Far Right candidate to be excluded to run.
- 22 March – Andrew and Tristan Tate return to Romania, stating they would face their ongoing legal cases on human trafficking.

=== April ===
- 27 April–3 May – 2025 IIHF World Championship Division I Group A

=== May ===
- 4 May – 2025 Romanian presidential election (first round): George Simion wins a plurality of the vote with 40.5%, followed by Nicușor Dan with 20.89%.
- 5 May – Marcel Ciolacu resigns as prime minister and withdraws his Social Democratic Party from the governing coalition.
- 6 May – Catalin Predoiu is appointed as acting prime minister by President Bolojan.
- 18 May – 2025 Romanian presidential election (second round): Nicușor Dan is elected president with 53.6% against George Simion's 46.4%.
- 26 May – Nicușor Dan is inaugurated as president.

=== June ===
- 13–26 June – 2025 UEFA European Under-19 Championship.
- 20 June – President Dan nominates former acting president Ilie Bolojan as prime minister.
- 23 June – The Chamber of Deputies approves Ilie Bolojan as prime minister.

=== July ===
- 28 July –
  - At least three people are killed in flash floods in Neamț and Suceava Counties.
  - A boat carrying 14 people capsizes along the Sulina branch of the Danube Delta in Tulcea County, killing four passengers.

=== September ===
- 8 September – The Czech Security Information Service announces the dismantling of an espionage network operating across several European countries and run by the Belarusian KGB following a joint operation by the Czech Republic, Romania, and Hungary.
- 13 September – A drone violates Romanian airspace over Tulcea County during a Russian attack on Ukraine.
- 16 September – Călin Georgescu and 21 others are charged with plotting a coup following the annulment of his first round victory in the 2024 Romanian presidential election.

=== October ===
- 9 October – A British Airways flight traveling from Istanbul to London makes an emergency landing at Bucharest Henri Coandă International Airport due to smoke. Four people are given medical assistance for possible smoke inhalation.
- 17 October – Three people are killed in an explosion at an apartment building in Bucharest.
- 20 October – One person is injured in an explosion at the Petrotel-Lukoil refinery in Ploiești.
- 21 October – Two Ukrainian nationals are arrested on suspicion of plotting sabotage attacks in Romania on behalf of Russia.
- 25 October – The National Cathedral of Romania formally opens, the tallest and largest Eastern Orthodox church building in the world.

=== November ===
- 3 November – The government signs an agreement with Rheinmetall to build a gunpowder factory in Victoria, Brașov County.

=== December ===
- 7 December – 2025 Bucharest mayoral election: Ciprian Ciucu of the National Liberal Party is elected as Mayor of Bucharest.
- 11 December – The first recorded case of leprosy in Romania since 1981 is diagnosed in a 21-year old patient from Asia working at a spa in Cluj-Napoca.

== Art and entertainment ==
- List of Romanian films of 2025
- List of 2025 box office number-one films in Romania
- List of Romanian submissions for the Academy Award for Best International Feature Film

== Deaths ==
=== January ===
- 8 January – Vasile Leva, 65, folk singer.
- 9 January
  - Neculai Iorga, 91, painter.
  - Marius Ciugarin, 75, footballer (Steaua București, FC Brașov, Progresul București).
- 16 January – Vasile Ardeleanu, 50, footballer (FCM Bacău, Focșani, Dinamo Onești).
- 18 January
  - Mărin Cornea, 77, popular music singer.
  - Nicolae Oaidă, 91, football player (Progresul București, national team) and manager (Tractorul Brașov).
- 19 January – Gheorghe Udriște, 77, engineer and MP (2012–2016).
- 21 January
  - Constantin Abăluță, architect, poet, writer and translator.
  - Teoharie Coca-Cosma, 84, sports commentator.
  - Ion Diaconescu, 67, footballer (Steaua București, Oțelul Galați, Dunărea Galați).
- 22 January – Cornel Oțelea, 84, handball player, world champion (1961, 1964, 1970).
- 27 January – Iusein Ibram, 71, MP (since 2016).
- 29 January – Dinu Gheorghe, 69, football club president (FC Rapid București, FC Astra Giurgiu).

=== February ===
- 3 February – Gheorghe Lazarovici, 83, archaeologist.
- 9 February – Elena Grölz, 64, Romanian-born German handball player (TV Lützellinden, Germany national team, 1992 Olympics).
- 18 February – Iudith Szabo, 96, surgeon.
- 28 February
  - Petre Brănișteanu, 66, basketball player.
  - Luca Manolache, 19, footballer (FCSB, FC Metaloglobus București), heart attack.

=== March ===
- 3 March – Felicia Țilea-Moldovan, 57, four-time Olympic javelin thrower.
- 7 March
  - Minerva, 66, astrologer.
  - Răzvan Ionilă, 43, football player (CF Braila, Petrolul Ploiești, Fortuna Covaci) and manager.
- 8 March – Ella Zeller, 91, table tennis player.
- 16 March
  - Gavrilă Birău, 79, football player (UTA Arad, Aurul Brad) and manager (UTA Arad).
  - Gheorghe Vărzaru, 64, rugby union player (Steaua București, national team).
- 19 March
  - Calistrat Cuțov, 76, boxer, Olympic bronze medallist (1968). (body discovered on this date)
  - Vasile Simionaș, 74, football player (Politehnica Iași, national team) and manager (Oțelul Galați). (death announced on this date)

=== April ===
- 18 April – Julieta Szönyi, 75, actress (Felix and Otilia, Toate pînzele sus).
- 29 April – Valeriu Tabără, 75, politician, deputy (1992–2000, 2004–2012).

=== May ===
- 2 May – Alexandra Bellow, 89, Romanian-American mathematician.

=== June ===
- 3 June – Acsinte Gaspar, 87, judge and politician, deputy (1996–2004), member of the constitutional court (2004–2013).
- 6 June – Virgil Nemoianu, 85, essayist and philosopher.
- 9 June – Marcel Sabou, 59, footballer (Dinamo București, CD Tenerife, Racing Santander).
- 12 June – Florea Dudiță, 91, politician, senator (1992–1993).
- 30 June – Lajos Sătmăreanu, 81, football player (Steaua București, Olympic team, national ream) and manager.

=== July ===
- 1 July – Mihai Leu, 56, boxer (Dinamo București) and rally driver (Romanian Rally Championship).
- 9 July – Ioana Bulcă, 89, film actress.

=== August ===
- 5 August – Ion Iliescu, 95, president (1989–1996, 2000–2004), state councillor (1979–1980), and five-time MP.
- 7 August – Lucia Efrim, 57, journalist.
- 18 August – Sandrino Gavriloaia, 61, journalist.
- 23 August – Ioan Donca, 85, diplomat.
- 28 August – Daniel Ariciu, 74, footballer (Argeș Pitești).

=== September ===
- 18 September – Florin Marin, 72, football player (Rapid București, FCSB) and manager (Farul Constanța), complications from dementia.
- 24 September – Maria Samungi, 75, Romanian Olympic sprinter (1980).
- 25 September – Lucian Mureșan, 94, Greek Catholic cardinal, bishop of Maramureș (1990–1994), archbishop (1994–2005) and major archbishop (since 2005) of Făgăraș and Alba Iulia.

=== October ===
- 11 October –
  - Marinela Chelaru, 66, actress.
  - Flavius Domide, 79, footballer (UTA Arad, national team).
- 18 October – Mircea Tiberian, 70, jazz pianist and composer.
- 26 October – Mihai Șubă, 78, Romanian-born Spanish chess grandmaster.

=== November ===
- 3 November – Constantin Zamfir, 74, footballer (Petrolul Ploiești, FCSB, national team).
- 5 November – Emerich Jenei, 88, football player (FCSB, national team) and manager (FCSB).
- 8 November – Viorel Sălan, 67, politician, senator (2016–2024).
- 20 November – Dumitru Gherman, 70, politician, deputy (2017–2020).

=== December ===
- 8 December – Radu Theodoru, 101, general, writer, and Holocaust denier.

== See also ==
- 2025 in the European Union
- 2025 in Europe
