= 2024 in Romania =

- Decades: 2000s; 2010s; 2020s
- See also: Other events of 2024; History of Romania; Timeline of Romanian history; Years in Romania

Events from the year 2024 in Romania.

== Incumbents ==
- President: Klaus Iohannis
- Prime Minister: Marcel Ciolacu
- Deputy Prime Ministers: Marian Neacșu and Cătălin Predoiu
- President of the Chamber of Deputies: Alfred Simonis (until 2 September); Daniel Suciu (2 September to 23 December); Ciprian-Constantin Șerban (since 23 December)
- President of the Senate: Nicolae Ciucă (until 23 December); Ilie Bolojan (since 23 December)
- President of the High Court of Cassation and Justice: Corina Corbu
- President of the Constitutional Court: Marian Enache
- Ciolacu Cabinet

== Events ==
=== March ===
- 12 March – President Klaus Iohannis announces that he will run for Secretary-General of the North Atlantic Treaty Organization.
- 31 March – Bulgaria and Romania partially join the Schengen Area, allowing travel by air and sea without border checks, Austria vetoed travel by land without border checks over fears that non-EU citizens could get easier access to the European Union.

=== April ===
- 26 April – A court in Bucharest rules that the human trafficking trial of British influencer Andrew Tate can proceed.

=== June ===
- 3 June – A foreign national is arrested on suspicion of throwing a molotov cocktail at the Israeli embassy in Bucharest.
- 7 June – Fifteen people are injured in an explosion at a home improvement store in Botoșani.
- 9 June:
  - 2024 European Parliament election in Romania
  - 2024 Romanian local elections
- 20 June – President Klaus Iohannis withdraws his candidacy for secretary general of NATO.

=== July ===
- 15 July – The government approves the culling of 481 bears in the country following the death of a 19-year-old woman in a bear attack in the Carpathian Mountains.

=== August ===
- 6 August – Prime Minister Marcel Ciolacu announces he will boycott the closing ceremony of the Paris Olympics due to an initial judging error in another competitor's Women's floor gymnastics routine, which after being corrected, caused Romanian gymnast Ana Bărbosu to move from bronze medal position to 4th place.
- 16 August – Romanian gymnast Ana Bărbosu is awarded a bronze medal in a ceremony in Bucharest. The medal was originally awarded to Jordan Chiles at the 2024 Summer Olympics.

=== September ===
- 12 September – A Russian missile strikes a Saint Kitts and Nevis-flagged bulk carrier carrying Ukrainian grain to Egypt in the exclusive economic zone of Romania in the Black Sea. No casualties are reported.
- 14–16 September – At least seven people, including four in Galați County, are reported killed amid flooding caused by Storm Boris.

=== October ===
- 5 October – The Constitutional Court of Romania (CCR) notably disqualified S.O.S. Romania candidate Diana Șoșoacă from running in the 2024 Romanian presidential election, ruling claiming that her public statements and conduct "systematically" violate the country's constitutional foundation of membership in Euro-Atlantic structures, without giving any specific reasons to backup their claim. The court's ruling, which was split 5–2 along party lines, was criticized by some for being politically motivated, undemocratic and a result of corruption.

=== November ===
- 24 November – 2024 Romanian presidential election (first round): Far-right independent Călin Georgescu wins a plurality of votes for the presidency and advances to the runoff along with centre-right candidate Elena Lasconi.
- 28 November – 2024 Romanian presidential election: The Constitutional Court of Romania orders a recount of the votes cast in the first round following an appeal.

=== December ===
- 1 December – 2024 Romanian parliamentary election: The Social Democratic Party wins a plurality of votes followed by the Alliance for the Union of Romanians and the National Liberal Party.
- 2 December – 2024 Romanian presidential election: The Constitutional Court unanimously validates the results of the first round of the presidential election.
- 6 December – 2024 Romanian presidential election: The Constitutional Court annuls the results of the first round of the presidential election after intelligence agencies alleged that Călin Georgescu benefited from a coordinated online campaign by Russia to promote his candidacy.
- 11 December – The Social Democratic Party, the National Liberal Party, Save Romania Union, and the Democratic Alliance of Hungarians in Romania agree to form a coalition government.
- 12 December – The European Union grants Romania and Bulgaria full entry to the Schengen Area beginning in 2025.
- 19 December – The Bucharest Court of Appeal rules that the human trafficking trial of British influencer Andrew Tate cannot proceed due to errors made by prosecutors.
- 23 December – President Iohannis nominates incumbent prime minister Marcel Ciolacu to lead the next government. His nomination is approved the same day by parliament in a 240-143 vote.

== Art and entertainment ==
- List of Romanian films of 2024
- List of 2024 box office number-one films in Romania
- List of Romanian submissions for the Academy Award for Best International Feature Film

== See also ==
- 2024 in the European Union
- 2024 in Europe
