= 2023 in Romania =

- Decades: 2000s; 2010s; 2020s
- See also: Other events of 2023; History of Romania; Timeline of Romanian history; Years in Romania

Events from the year 2023 in Romania.

== Incumbents ==
- President: Klaus Iohannis
- Prime Minister: Nicolae Ciucă (until 15 June); Cătălin Predoiu (from 12 June until 15 June; acting); Marcel Ciolacu (from 15 June)
- Deputy Prime Ministers: Hunor Kelemen and Sorin Grindeanu (until 15 June); Marian Neacșu and Cătălin Predoiu (from 15 June)
- President of the Chamber of Deputies: Marcel Ciolacu (until 15 June); Alfred Simonis (from 15 June)
- President of the Senate: Alina Gorghiu (until 13 June) (acting/ad interim); Nicolae Ciucă (since 13 June)
- President of the High Court of Cassation and Justice: Corina Corbu
- President of the Constitutional Court: Marian Enache
- Ciucă Cabinet (until 15 June); First Ciolacu cabinet (from 15 June)

== Ongoing events ==
- COVID-19 pandemic in Romania
  - Moldovan–Romanian collaboration during the COVID-19 pandemic

== Events ==
=== January ===
- 1 January:
  - The minimum gross pay increases from 2,550 Romanian lei to 3,000 Romanian lei, while the minimum wage in construction is increased from 3,000 lei to 4,000 lei.
  - The pension point becomes worth 1,785 Romanian lei.
  - A law regarding tips and the taxation of tips enters force.
- 2 January – Ioan Ovidiu Sabău becomes technical head of the FC Universitatea Cluj, replacing Eugen Neagoe.
- 3 January – The bank accounts of Banca Românească customers become EximBank accounts, as part of an ongoing absorption process by the latter of the former.
- 4 January:
  - Car parts manufacturer Altur SA Slatina goes into insolvency.
  - Romanian public carrier TAROM replaces CEO Mihăiță Ursu with its chief financial officer, Costin Iordache.
- 5 January:
  - Judge Daniel Grădinaru is elected president of the Superior Council of the Magistrature (Romanian: Consiliul Superior al Magistraturii, CSM), while prosecutor Daniel Horodniceanu is elected its vice president, both of whom were elected unanimously by the CSM.
  - The Romanian Olympic and Sports Committee announces Romania's team of 18 that is taking part at the 2023 European Youth Olympic Winter Festival.
  - During a press conference, education minister Ligia Deca discourages pupils from skipping classes in the context of the flu season.
  - SCM "U" Craiova defeats FC Argeș Pitești, score 68-62, during the 13th stage of the national men's basketball cup.
- 6 January – The terms of Marian Budă, president of the Superior Council of the Magistrature (Romanian: Consiliul Superior al Magistraturii, CSM) and of two representatives of the civil society within the CSM, Victor Alistar and Romeu Chelariu, expire.
  - The Ministry of Finance borrows, through two benchmark type loans, 3.347 million lei from banks.
- 7 January:
  - The terms of Daniel Grădinaru and Daniel Horodniceanu within the CSM start.
  - Romanian deputy Viorel Focșa is excluded from the Alliance for the Union of Romanians, following a Facebook post where he was telling how he had beaten his wife. The party asks of him to resign from being a member of the Parliament of Romania.
- 8 January:
  - Romsilva is expecting a gross profit of 250 million lei throughout 2023, half of the one recorded throughout 2022.
  - Bogdan Țîru signs with CFR Cluj to be transferred from Jagiellonia Bialystok.
- 9 January:
  - President Klaus Iohannis promulgates several laws, including one prolonging the mandates of four out of the seven members of the regelementation committee of the National Authority for Reglemantation in the Energy domain (Romanian: Comitetul de reglementare al Autorității Naționale de Reglementare în Domeniul Energiei for a period of six months. The president of the National Authority for Reglementation in the Energy domain, Dumitru Chiriță, is among those people.
  - A new season of Survivor România starts.
  - CS Dinamo București inaugurates a swimming academy.
- 10 January:
  - The general assembly of the Romanian Association of Banks (Romanian: Asociația Română a Băncilor) votes on the make-up of its board of directors, following the vacancy of one seat.
  - CFR Cluj announces it has reached a deal with FC Ballkani on transferring Ermal Krasniqi from the latter to the former.
  - At 16:00 EET, the first ruling coalition meeting of 2023 takes place.
  - The Romanian translation of Prince Harry's Spare novel is published officially in Romania.
  - The National Bank of Romania announces the raise of its monetary policy key interest rate from 6.75% to 7% per annum, effective on 11 January.
  - President Klaus Iohannis promulgates a law meant to fund the construction of a Victims of Communism Museum in Washington, D.C., with 3 million United States dollars.
  - Minister of Foreign Affairs Bogdan Aurescu receives the Brazilian ambassador to Romania, Maria Laura da Rocha, who nears the end of her term in Romania. He expressed his support for Brazil's president, Lula da Silva.
  - Low cost carrier Wizz Air announces the closure of its hub in Bacău.
  - President Klaus Iohannis promulgates a law declaring the day of 11 June "The Day of the Victory of the Revolution from 1848 and of Romanian Democracy" (Romanian: Ziua Victoriei Revoluției de la 1848 și a Democrației Românești).
  - Andrew Tate and his brother, Tristan, appeal their sentence at the Bucharest Court of Appeal. The court found the claims of the appeal to be unfounded, which keeps the Tate brothers into custody.
- 11 January:
  - The monetary policy key interest rate of the National Bank of Romania is raised from 6.75% to 7% per annum.
  - Babeș-Bolyai University claimed that the suspicions of plagiarism in the doctoral thesis of Interior Minister Lucian Bode "are confirmed in the vast majority" and requested the withdrawal of the book published on its basis. The position expressed by the university of Cluj, where Lucian Bode made a doctoral thesis in the field of energy security, comes after the ethics committee of the educational institution verified the minister’s work.
- 11–15 January - The 2023 EduSport Trophy for figure skating is held in Otopeni.
- 12 January:
  - Tudor Gheorghe's "Valsurile Mele" (My Waltzes) concert takes place at Sala Palatului.
  - The women's ACS Sepsi-SIC basketball team faces Basket Namur Capitale at the FIBA EuroCup in Sfântu Gheorghe.
  - The headquarters of the Romanian Cultural Institute (Romanian: Institutul Cultural Român) is expected to host an art exposition named "Artiști români pe mapamond" (Romanian artists on the globe), until 28 February.
- 15 January
  - The National Museum of History of Romania (Romanian: Muzeul Național de Istorie a României) shows the public a trophy earned by poet Vasile Alecsandri in Montpellier in 1878.
  - The America Express - Road of Gold (Romanian: America Express - Drumul Aurului) season premieres on Antena 1.
- 20 January
  - Season 13 of Românii au talent premieres on Pro TV.
  - Taximetriști, a movie directed by Bogdan Theodor Olteanu, premieres in Romanian movie theatres.
- 21–22 January: 22nd stage of the 2022–2023 Liga I season.
- 27 January – After being moved between courts, the first term of the Romanian Revolution case (Romanian: Dosarul Revoluției) commences in the preliminary chamber of the Supreme Court.

=== February ===
- 6 February - A trial where Romanian politician Ludovic Orban accuses the Government of Romania of not willing to hold local elections in 50 localities lacking mayors starts.
- 10 February - The Romanian Tennis Federation (Romanian: Federația Română de Tenis) votes its new president.
- 11 February – Romania in the Eurovision Song Contest – Selecția Națională is broadcast live, featuring 12 finalists running for Romania's bid at the 2023 Eurovision Song Contest.
- 14 February – 2023 Moldova and Romania high-altitude objects: The Romanian Air Force unsuccessfully attempts to intercept an unidentified flying object detected roughly 11,000 metres (6.8 mi) above Southeast Romania.
- 17–19 February – Roughly 50 events kick in the scheduled year of cultural events as part of Timișoara's part in the round of 2023 European Capitals of Culture: Elefsina, Veszprém and Timișoara.
- 22–26 February – The National Chemistry Olympiad (Romanian: Olimpiada Națională de Chimie) takes place.
- 22 February – The High Court of Cassation and Justice debates an extraordinary appeal regarding the imprisonment of Cristian Popescu Piedone, in the Colectiv nightclub fire case.

=== March ===
- 1–4 March – André Rieu and the Johann Strauss Orchestra hold four concerts on the BTarena in Cluj-Napoca.
- 2 March – The appeal on the honours inheritance from the historic FC Steaua dispute between CSA Steaua București and FCSB takes place at the High Court of Cassation and Justice.
- 3–5 March – The first edition of the Masiff Festival takes place in Poiana Brașov.
- 25 March – One person is killed and three others are injured in a train crash at the Galați railway station.

=== April ===
- 3 April – Minister of Education Ligia Deca takes stock of her first six months into office.
- 10–13 April – The National Romanian Language and Literature Olympiad (Romanian: Olimpiada Națională de Limba și Literatura Română) and the National German Native Language Olympiad (Romanian: Olimpiada Națională de Limba Germană Maternă) took place.
- 10–14 April – The National Biology Olympiad (Romanian: Olimpiada Națională de Biologie, the National Mathematics Olympiad (Romanian: Olimpiada Națională de Matematică), the National History Olympiad (Romanian: Olimpiada Națională de Istorie) and all of the national Olympiads relating to technological disciplines took place.

=== May ===
- 1 May – An agreement between retailers and dairy processing companies lasting six months to reduce the shelf price of Romanian milk by 20%, meaning 10% on the dairy processing companies' side and other 10% on the retailers' side enters force.
- 4–16 May – The 2023 edition of the Grand Chess Tour is hosted in Bucharest.
- 21 May – Teachers in Romania announce that they are going on strike on 22 May.

=== July ===
- 5–9 July – The National Astronomy and Astrophysics Olympiad (Romanian: Olimpiada Națională de Astronomie și Astrofizică) takes place.
- 24–28 July – The National Olympiad of Sciences for Juniors (Romanian: Olimpiada Națională de Științe pentru Juniori) takes place.

=== August ===
- 11 August – The National Institute of Statistics shows that the inflation rate of Romania for July 2023 was at 9.4%, the first time since January 2022 for the rate to be below 10%.
- 23 August – Three police officers are being investigated by the Constanța county court and four heads of the Constanța County Police Inspectorate are ousted, following an investigation of the Ministry of Internal Affairs of how Constanța police officers handled a man who ended up killing two youths on 19 August in 2 Mai.
- 26 August – Three explosions at an LPG station in Crevedia result in the death of 2 people and 58 injuries.
- 28 August – The chief of the Constanța County Police Inspectorate, Constantin Adrian Glugă, resigns.
- 29 August – Minister of interior Cătălin Predoiu says in a DCNews interview that the fight against drugs is lost for Romanian adults, underlining the importance of preventing drug use within the young generation.

=== September ===
- 9 September – Prime minister Marcel Ciolacu states that Romania must declare zero tolerance on drug trafficking.
- 21 September – Four people are killed and five more injured during an explosion at a gas pipeline in Vrancea County.

=== October ===
- 4 October
  - Minister of Justice Alina Gorghiu and other National Liberal Party members of parliament submit a bill nicknamed "2 Mai" regarding the punishments for drug trafficking to the Chamber of Deputies.
  - President Klaus Iohannis announces the inclusion of drug use on the Supreme Council of National Defence's (Romanian: Consiliul Suprem de Apărare a Țării, CSAT) agenda for its summoning on 12 October.
- 12 October – The CSAT reaches the conclusion that the Government of Romania has to analyse and modify all laws relating to the consumption and trafficking of drugs, and that an interinstitutional work group between the Ministry of Internal Affairs, Ministry of Justice, Ministry of Health, Ministry of Education, Ministry of Family, Youth and Equal Opportunities and representatives of the Romanian Intelligence Service has to be established.

=== November ===
- 20 November – The Senate approves the "2 Mai" bill, moving it to the Chamber of Deputies, with 90 votes in favour.
- 30 November – The RetuRO system, aimed at rewarding Romanians financially for recycling PET, glass or metal bottles and containers is expected to become operational.

=== December ===
- 13 December – The National Institute of Statistics announces that the annual national inflation rate of Romania for November 2023 was at 6.72%.
- 14 December – Romania says that a Russian drone has crashed in its territory, leaving a crater in Grindu, Tulcea, near the Ukrainian border. Romanian Air Force F-16s and German Air Force Eurofighter Typhoons conducted joint patrols in response to the violation of NATO airspace.
- 26 December – Five people are killed, two are injured and three others are missing during a fire in Prahova. Six fire safety warnings were issued by inspectors for the property previously.
- 28 December – Bulgaria and Romania reach an agreement to become members of the Schengen Area through sea and air routes in March 2024, while discussions regarding the opening of land borders are scheduled to commence in 2024.
- 30 December – Minister of Education Ligia Deca takes stock of her first year into office.

== Deaths ==
=== January ===
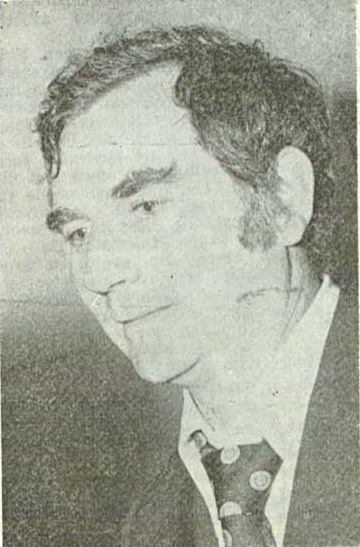
D.R. Popescu

- 2 January – Dumitru Radu Popescu, 87, novelist, poet and dramatist.
- 3 January – Mitică Popescu, 86, film, radio, theater, television and voice actor.
- 12 January – Aurel Mitran, 68, rock band manager (Holograf).
- 17 January – Teodor Corban, 65, actor (12:08 East of Bucharest, 4 Months, 3 Weeks and 2 Days, Tales from the Golden Age).

=== February ===
- 6 February – Răzvan Theodorescu, 83, historian and politician.
- 25 February –

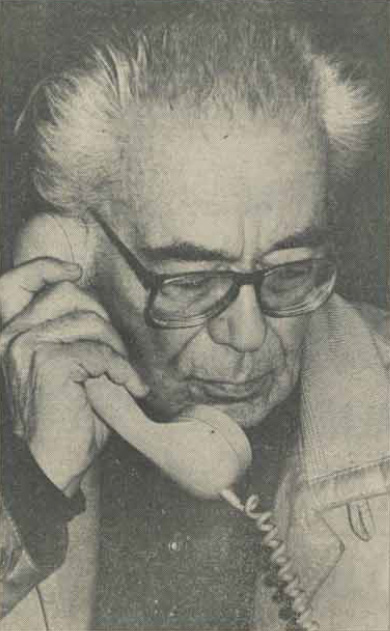
Mihai Șora

  - Mihai Șora, 106, philosopher and essayist.
  - Victor Babiuc, 84, jurist and politician.

=== March ===
- 12 March – Rudel Obreja, 57, boxer and businessman.
- 29 March – Tiberiu Ceia, 82, folk singer.

== See also ==
- 2023 in Romanian kickboxing
- 2023 in the European Union
- 2023 in Europe
- Romania in the Eurovision Song Contest 2023
