= Chelaru =

Chelaru is a surname. Notable people with the surname include:

- Diana Chelaru (born 1993), Romanian gymnast
- Marinela Chelaru (1959–2025), Romanian comic actress and a teacher
- Mircea Chelaru (born 1949), Romanian general and politician
- Octav Chelaru (born 1991), Romanian film director and screenwriter
- Vasile Chelaru (1921–1999), Romanian fencer
