= 2011 Romanian census =

2011 census held in Romania

← 2002	20–31 October 2011	2021 →

General information
- Country: Romania
- Authority: INS (Note: National Institute of Statistics (Romanian: Insitutul Național de Statistică).)
- Website: recensamantromania.ro

Results
- Total population: 20,121,641 (▼7.19% (Note: Decrease from 21,608,974 inhabitants in 2002.))
- Most populous county: Bucharest (1,883,400)
- Least populous county: Covasna (210,200)

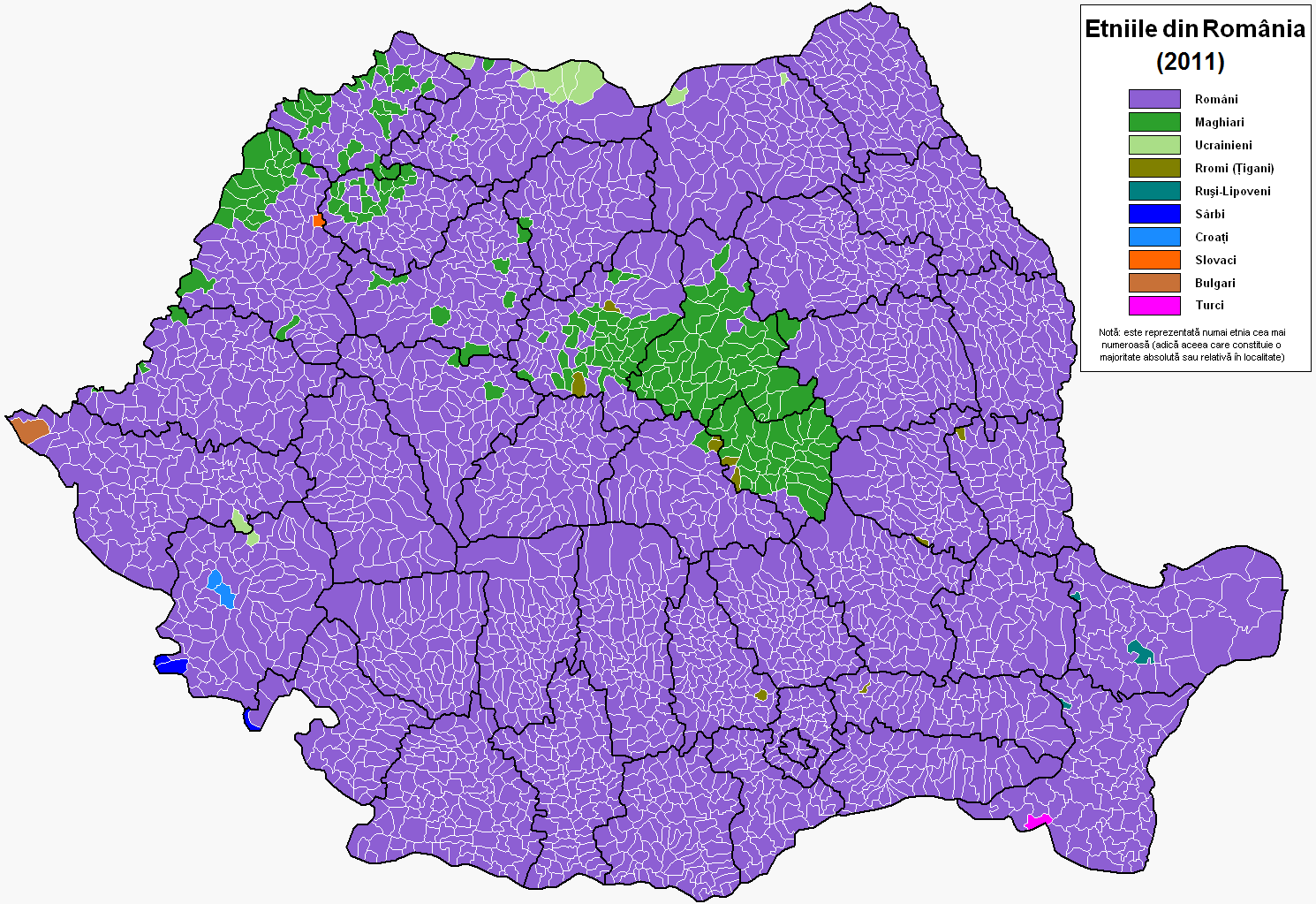
Ethnic map of Romania according to the results of the 2011 census

The 2011 Romanian census was a census held in Romania between 20 and 31 October 2011. It was performed by some 120,000 census takers in around 101,000 statistic sectors throughout the country established by the National Institute of Statistics (INS) of Romania. Preparations started already in 2009, and it was announced that the process would not end until 2014. Anyone who did not answer questions in the census questionnaire would be fined between 1,500 and 4,500 Romanian lei, although 4 of the 100 questions related to the respondent's ethnicity, mother language, religion, and possible disabilities were not mandatory.

Preliminary results were released once on 2 February 2012 and again on 20 August 2012. The final definitive result of the census came out on 4 July 2013, showing that, among other things, Romania had lost 1,559,300 people since the 2002 census, consequently having 20,121,641 inhabitants. Some people like sociologist Vasile Ghețău, director of the Center of Demographic Studies of the Romanian Academy and professor at the University of Bucharest, criticized the way the 2011 census was conducted. He mentioned problems such as people confusing the census taker, the use of old maps of the statistical sectors, some people giving incorrect data or no data at all, the "anti-census" attitude of the press and others, concluding that the "failure" of the census was not only of the Romanian Government, but also the country's population.

== See also ==
- Demographics of Romania
