= Gherman =

In Romanian, Gherman is the variant of the name German, derived from the Latin Germanus. It may also refer to:

== Places ==
- Gherman, a village in Bicaz-Chei Commune, Neamț County, Romania
- Gherman, a village in Jamu Mare Commune, Timiș County, Romania
- Gherman, a village in Sculeni Commune, Ungheni district, Moldova

== People ==
=== Given name ===
- Gherman Pântea (1894–1968), Romanian politician
- Gherman Titov (1935–2000), Soviet cosmonaut

=== Surname ===
- Cosmin Gherman (born 1984), Romanian futsal player
- Diomid Gherman (1928–2014), Moldovan physician
- Dumitru Gherman (1954–2025), Romanian politician
- Marius Gherman (born 1967), Romanian artistic gymnast
- Oliviu Gherman (1930–2020), Romanian physicist, politician and diplomat
- Simona Gherman (born 1985), Romanian fencer
- Stella Gherman (born 1974), Moldovan politician
