= List of Romanian films of 2026 =

The following is the list of Romanian films of 2026.

== List ==
Sources: IMDb Cinemagia

Opening	Title	Director	Cast	Genre(s)	Ref.
6 February 2026	Băieți de oraș: Golden Boyz	Mihai Bendeac	Mihai Bendeac, Vlad Drăgulin, Cosmin Nedelcu, Anca Dinicu, Doina Teodoru, Lorena Luchian	Comedy	
13 February 2026	În pielea mea	Paul Decu	Sergiu Costache, Vlad Gherman, George Tănase, Gabriel Vatavu, Oana Gherman	Comedy	
20 February 2026	The Samca File	Horia Cucuta, George ve Gänæaard	Dana Marineci, Răzvan Ilie, Emilian Oprea, Alin Florea, Silviu Debu	Thriller	
27 February 2026	Kîzîm	Radu Potcoavă	Yeliz Mustafa, Tudor Chirilă, Amuly, Elias Ferkin, Judith State	Adventure, Romance	
15 May 2026	The Diary of a Chambermaid	Radu Jude	Ana Dumitrașcu, Mélanie Thierry, Vincent Macaigne, Marie Rivière	Drama	
20 May 2026	Titanic Ocean	Konstantina Kotzamani	Arisa Sasaki, Melina Mardini, Haruna Matsui, Sei Matobu	Fantasy drama	
22 May 2026	Mă mut la mama	George Buzoianu, Gelu Colceag	Adriana Trandafir, Gabriel Fătu, Andreas Petrescu, Adrian Păduraru, Carmen Tănase, Maia Morgenstern	Comedy	
19 August 2026	Fjord	Cristian Mungiu	Sebastian Stan, Renate Reinsve	Drama	

== See also ==
- 2026 in Romania
- List of 2026 box office number-one films in Romania
- The Sentence (upcoming film)
