= Cernătești =

Cernăteşti may refer to several places in Romania:

- Cernătești, Buzău, a commune in Buzău County
- Cernătești, Dolj, a commune in Dolj County
