= Ciupercă =

Ciupercă is a Romanian surname. Notable people with the surname include:

- Nicolae Ciupercă (1882–1950), Romanian general
- Valeriu Ciupercă (born 1992), Moldovan-born Russian footballer
- Vasile Silvian Ciupercă (1949–2022), Romanian politician
