= 2027 in Romania =

- Decades: 2000s; 2010s; 2020s
- See also: Other events of 2027; History of Romania; Timeline of Romanian history; Years in Romania

Events from the year 2027 in Romania.

== Events ==
=== Predicted or scheduled ===
- 2027 European Youth Olympic Winter Festival
- The 150th year of Romanian independence

== Holidays ==
- 1 January - New Year´s day
- 2 January - Day after New Year´s Day
- 6 January - Epiphany
- 7 January Synaxis of St. John the Baptist
- 24 January - Unification Day
- 19 February - Constantin Brancusi Day
- 24 February - Dragobete
- 1 March - Mărțișor
- 8 March - International Women´s day
- 20 March - March Equinox
- July 29 - National Anthem Day
- August 15 - St. Mary´s day
- 23 September - September Equinox
- 31 October - Halloween
- 30 November - St. Andrew´s Day
- 1 December - National Day
- 8 December - Constitution Day
- 21 December - December Solstice
- 24 December - Christmas Eve
- 25 December - Christmas Day
- 26 December - Second day of Christmas
- 31 December - New Year´s Eve

== See also ==
- 2027 in Europe
