= Romanian Statistical Yearbook =

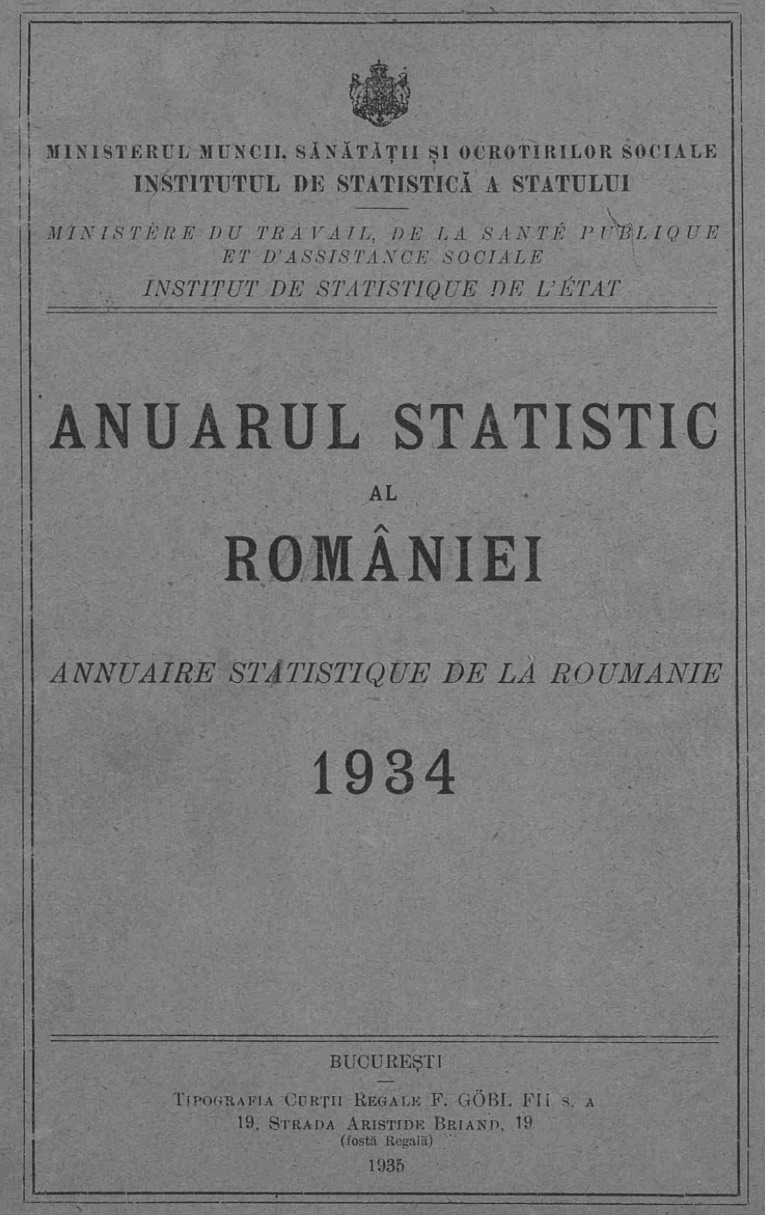
Romanian Statistical Yearbook for 1934

The Romanian Statistical Yearbook (Romanian: Anuarul Statistic al României) is an annual publication of the National Institute of Statistics that presents data about the economic and social situation in Romania.

The first yearbook appeared in 1902. The second, from 1912, came to over 800 pages, and presented data regarding the country's economic and social evolution over the previous decade. A third edition, covering the years 1915-1916, was begun in 1916 but did not appear until 1919, due to World War I. The next yearbook, covering 1922, came in 1923, and was followed by annual editions through 1940, a few of them describing two years. The 1931 edition was notable for incorporating data from the 1930 census and the 1931 election. For the first time, the 1931-1932, 1933 and 1934 editions included detailed data about the main exports from the 1929-1932 period, as well as statistics relating to the census of school-age children. The 1934 yearbook contained detailed information about agriculture, particularly in regard to the surface area devoted to fruit trees, the state of zootechnics and the number of tractors. The 1939-1940 yearbook was the final one before the communist regime resumed their publication after a 17-year gap. Annual statistical communiqués helped compensate for this absence in the 1945-1948 period.

The next yearbook was published in 1957 and covered the years 1951-1955. Its authors noted that older data were adapted to current methodology, and that they were recalculated for the current national territory, which was smaller than that of Greater Romania. For the remainder of the regime's existence, which came to an end with the Romanian Revolution of 1989, yearbooks continued to appear annually. The editions of 1987, 1988 and 1989 were brochures of around 100 pages that indicated exponential growth in all areas of economic and social activity. The 1990 yearbook readopted the practice of including a number of indicators for the country's economic and social evolution. During the 1990s, the yearbook returned to a length of 700-1000 pages. Beginning in 1990, in the interests of transparency, relevance and credibility, the yearbook featured indicators previously hidden from public view. Examples include the use of economic resources, gross domestic product, national wealth, energy, housing and income, spending and consumption of the populace. The authors focused on aligning with international standards as well as including correct and comprehensive data for users of statistical information. The 2009 yearbook appeared in a special jubilee edition commemorating 150 years of official statistics in Romania.

The yearbook includes the most recent data available in order to draw a picture of the economic situation and of the main economic indicators' evolution over the preceding few years. It is divided into twenty-three chapters: geography, meteorology and environment; population; workforce; income, spending and consumption; housing and public utilities; security and social assistance; health; education; culture and sport; prices; National Accounts; investments and tangible assets; science, technology and innovation; agriculture and forestry; business activity; industry and construction; transport, post and telecommunications; international trade; domestic trade and market services; tourism; finance; justice system; international statistics. The publication appears in print and comes with a CD-ROM that includes national and regional data in Microsoft Excel.
