= Viorel Sălan =

Romanian politician (1958–2025)

Viorel Sălan (14 November 1958 – 8 November 2025) was a Romanian politician.

== Life and career ==
Sălan was born in Cernătești, Dolj County on 14 November 1958. He joined the military, and retired on 1 September 2016. He was elected as a member of the Senate of Romania in 21 December 2016, as a member of the Social Democratic Party.

Sălan died on 8 November 2025, at the age of 67.
