= Alfred Simonis =

Member of the Romanian Parliament

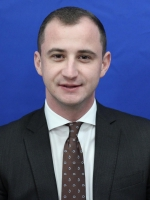
- Simonis in 2023

President of Timis County
- Incumbent
- Assumed office 4 November 2024

President of the Chamber of Deputies
- Acting
- In office 15 June 2023 – 2 September 2024
- President: Klaus Iohannis
- Preceded by: Marcel Ciolacu
- Succeeded by: Vasile-Daniel Suciu

Member of the Chamber of Deputies
- Incumbent
- Assumed office 21 December 2016
- Constituency: Timiș County

Personal details
- Born: Alfred-Robert Simonis; 4 January 1985 (age 41) Timișoara, Timiș County, Socialist Republic of Romania
- Party: Social Democratic Party (PSD)
- Education: Tibiscus University of Timișoara

Alfred-Robert Simonis (born 4 January 1985) is a Romanian businessman and politician, born in Timiș County, member of the Social Democratic Party since 2001 and a member of Chamber of Deputies since 2016.

Simonis is the President of the Timiș County Council (CJ Timiș) and of the National Union of County Councils of Romania (UNCJR). He is married to Elena Simonis and has three children.

He also has a younger brother, Gerald-Oscar Simonis, who is the mayor of Moșnița Nouă, a large commune in the metropolitan area of Timișoara.

== Political activity ==
Alfred Simonis has been a member of the Social Democratic Party (PSD) since 2001. He has held some leadership position in the Timiș wing of the Social Democratic Youth up until 2019.

For four years, between 2012 and 2016, he was a local councilor of the Municipality of Timișoara.

In the parliamentary elections of 2016, Alfred-Robert Simonis won the first PSD deputy mandate (electoral constituency no. 37 - Timiș), being re-elected for the second mandate in 2020.
