= Mircea Tomuș =

Romanian writer and literary historian (1934–2021)

- Born: Mircea Tomuș; 9 January 1934; Mociu, Cluj, Romania
- Died: 28 March 2022 (aged 88); Sibiu, Romania
- Citizenship: Romanian
- Education: Babeș-Bolyai University
- Occupations: Writer, historian

Mircea Tomuș (9 January 1934 – 28 March 2022) was a Romanian writer and literary historian.

== Life ==
Tomuș was born in Mociu, Cluj County, as the son of the priest Axente Tomuș and the teacher Ana Tomuș (born Coțofană). After graduating from the Classical High School in Cluj, in 1951, he attended the courses of the Faculty of Philology at the University of Cluj-Napoca (1951–1955). Between 1955 and 1970, he worked as an editor for "Steaua", the magazine that prepared / started the anti-proletarian battle, won by the "great lyrical explosion" of 1964–1965, and also the "resurrection of 1965–1970". He was then editor-in-chief of Dacia Publishing House (in Cluj-Napoca), between 1970 and 1972 (until May), and of the magazine "Transilvania" (in Sibiu), twice, between 1972 and 1990. between 2000 and 2002. In 1993 and 1994, he was secretary of state in the Romanian Ministry of Culture, and from 1995 to 1997, deputy director of the Village Museum in Bucharest, director of the Mogoșoaia Cultural Center, director of the magazine "Cultura Națională" and editor-in-chief of the magazine "Rostirea românească". From 1997 until his death, he was a professor at the Faculty of Letters and Arts of the "Lucian Blaga" University of Sibiu. A decade passed between his debut in the magazine "Steaua" in 1955 and his editorial debut, with a monograph dedicated to one of the eminent personalities of the Wallachian Anti-Habsburg Enlightenment School in Transylvania, Gheorghe Șincai.

== Death ==
Tomuș died at the age of 88, in Sibiu, Romania.

== Awards ==
- Romanian Academy Award (1965).
- Cluj-Napoca Writers Association Award (1970).
- Romanian Writers' Union Award (1973).
