= Peter Imre =

Romanian businessman (1962–2022)

Peter Imre (27 February 1962 – 1 July 2022) was a Romanian businessman and food critic. Born in Zalău on 27 February 1962, he frequently wrote in the financial newspaper Ziarul Financiar, and was the director of corporate affairs for Philip Morris in Romania. He was married to Marina Meleşcanu. Imre died in Bucharest on 1 July 2022, at the age of 60.
