= Leluț Vasilescu =

Romanian drummer (1955–2022)

Aurel Leluț Vasilescu
- Also known as: Megastar
- Born: 22 December 1955; Câmpia Turzii, Romania
- Died: 23 June 2022 (aged 66)
- Genres: Rock
- Occupations: Musician
- Instruments: Drums
- Formerly of: Compact

Aurel Leluț Vasilescu (22 December 1955 – 23 June 2022), known as Megastar, was a Romanian drummer. He was one of the founding members of the Romanian rock band Compact whose hits include "Fata Din Vis", "Cîntec Pentru Prieteni", "Cine Ești Tu", "Oare?" and "Mă Voi Întoarce".

He was awarded the status of honorary citizen of Câmpia Turzii in 2010.

He died on 23 June 2022 after a long battle with illness.
