= Maria Haiduc =

Romanian folk singer (1939–2026)

Maria Haiduc (29 September 1939 – 7 June 2026) was a Romanian folk singer.

== Life and career ==
Haiduc was born in Oradea on 29 September 1939. She made her debut in 1955, and focused on the folklore of Bihor.

Haiduc died on 7 June 2026, at the age of 86.

== Awards ==
- 2011: Excellence award from the Federation of Bihor Business Owners
