= Gheorghe Vărzaru =

Romanian rugby union player (1960–2025)

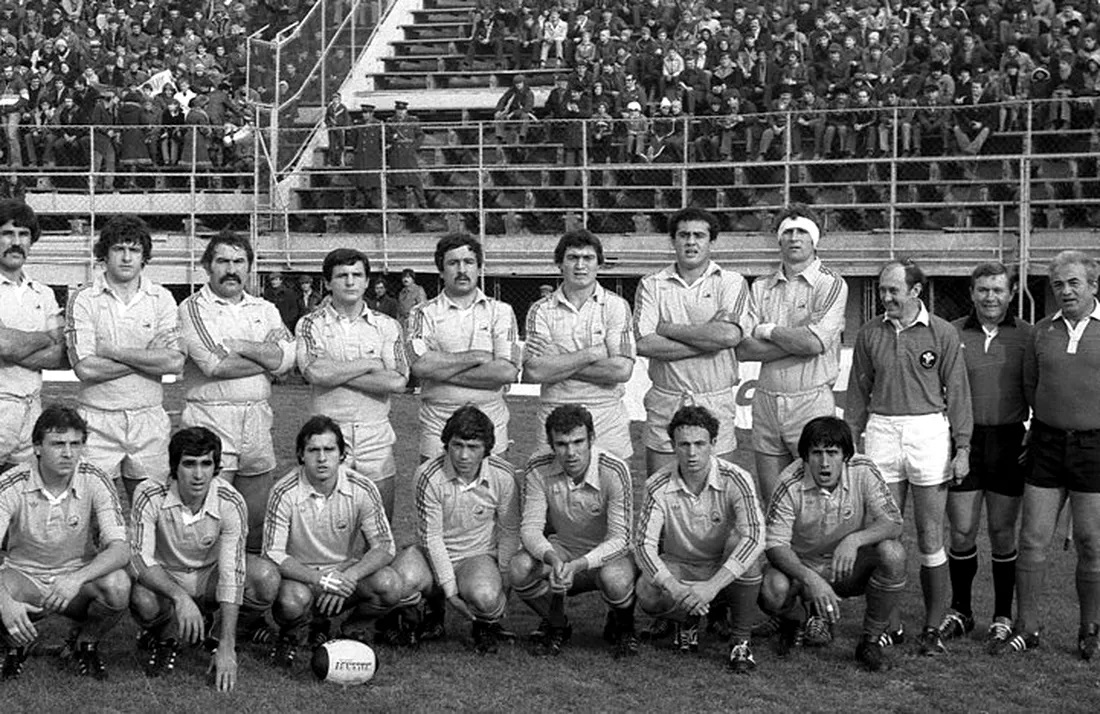
- Vărzaru (bottom row, second from right) with Romania's national team in 1980
- Born: 30 April 1960 Cobadin, Romania
- Died: 16 March 2025 (aged 64) Bucharest, Romania

Rugby union career
- Position(s): Centre; Wing
Senior career
Years	Team	Apps	(Points)
1979–1981	Farul Constanța	?	(?)
1981–1982	CS Vienne	?	(?)
1982–1991	Steaua București	?	(?)
1991–1993	Saumur Rugby	?	(?)
1993–1994	Steaua București	?	(?)
International career
Years	Team	Apps	(Points)
1980–1988	Romania	23	(4)

Gheorghe Vărzaru (30 April 1960 – 16 March 2025) was a Romanian rugby union player.

== Biography ==
His career lasted from the 1970s to the 1990s and included a stint at the French club CS Vienne. He made 23 appearances with the Romanian national team, scoring four points.

Vărzaru died in Bucharest on 16 March 2025, at the age of 64.

== Honours ==
=== Club ===
Steaua București

- Romanian League (6): 1982–83, 1983–84, 1984–85, 1986–87, 1987–88, 1988–89

=== International ===
Romania

- FIRA European Trophy (2): 1980–81, 1982–83
