= Daniel Suciu =

Romanian politician

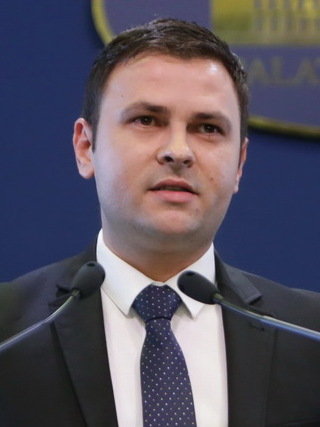
- Suciu in 2019

President of the Chamber of Deputies
- In office 2 September 2024 – 23 December 2024
- Preceded by: Alfred Simonis
- Succeeded by: Ciprian-Constantin Șerban

Personal details
- Born: Vasile-Daniel Suciu; 7 November 1980 (age 45) Bistrița, Bistrița-Năsăud County, Socialist Republic of Romania
- Party: PSD (2007–present)
- Education: Lucian Blaga University of Sibiu

Vasile-Daniel Suciu (born 7 November 1980) is a Romanian politician. A member of the Social Democratic Party (PSD), he has represented Bistrița-Năsăud County in the Chamber of Deputies since 2012.

== Biography ==
Born in Bistrița, he attended a local primary school from 1987 to 1995, followed by the Andrei Mureșanu National College from 1995 to 1999. He then enrolled in the law faculty at the Lucian Blaga University of Sibiu, earning a degree in political science in 2003. From 2004 to 2007, he was head of the politics section at a daily Bistrița newspaper; near the end of this period, he was a correspondent for the national Evenimentul Zilei. During much of 2007, he directed the office of the county Prefect. That autumn, Suciu became a parliamentary assistant, serving until 2012. As such, he maintained relations with local mayors as well as with the press.

He joined the PSD in 2007. The following June, he was elected to the county council, where he became leader of the PSD group. In 2009, Suciu became spokesman for the county party chapter. In 2010, he became president of the Bistrița-Năsăud Social Democratic Youth as well as vice president of the county's PSD affiliate. At the 2012 legislative election, he was elected to the Chamber, winning 54.3% of the vote and defeating his nearest rival by a margin of 31.8%. He was assigned to the labor committee; in early 2014, he switched to the environment committee, where he became secretary. Since 2018, he has been the leader of the PSD parliamentary group in the Chamber of Deputies.

He and his wife Reluța have two children.
