= Vasile Constantin Mao =

Romanian rugby union coach (1937–2026)

Vasile Constantin (7 October 1937 – 1 March 2026), better known as Mao, was a Romanian rugby union coach and academic.

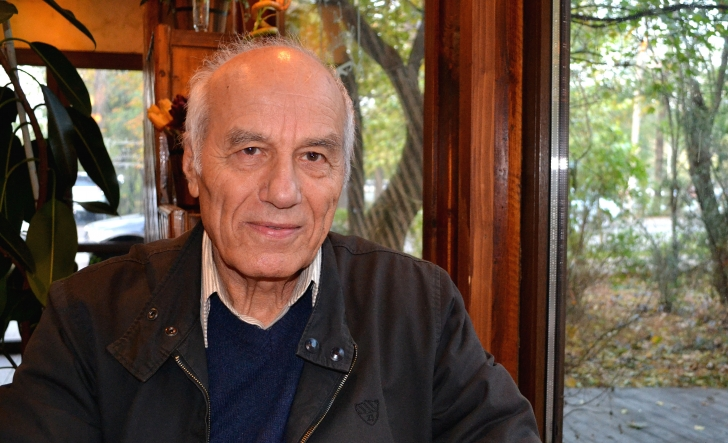
Vasile Constantin

== Life and career ==
Constantin was born in Plevna village, Călărași County on 7 October 1937. He was recognised as a highly prolific Romanian rugby union coach, often referred to as the "father" of the Locomotiva team.

Constantin died on 1 March 2026, at the age of 88.
