= Galați railway station =

Railway station in Galați County, Romania

Galați
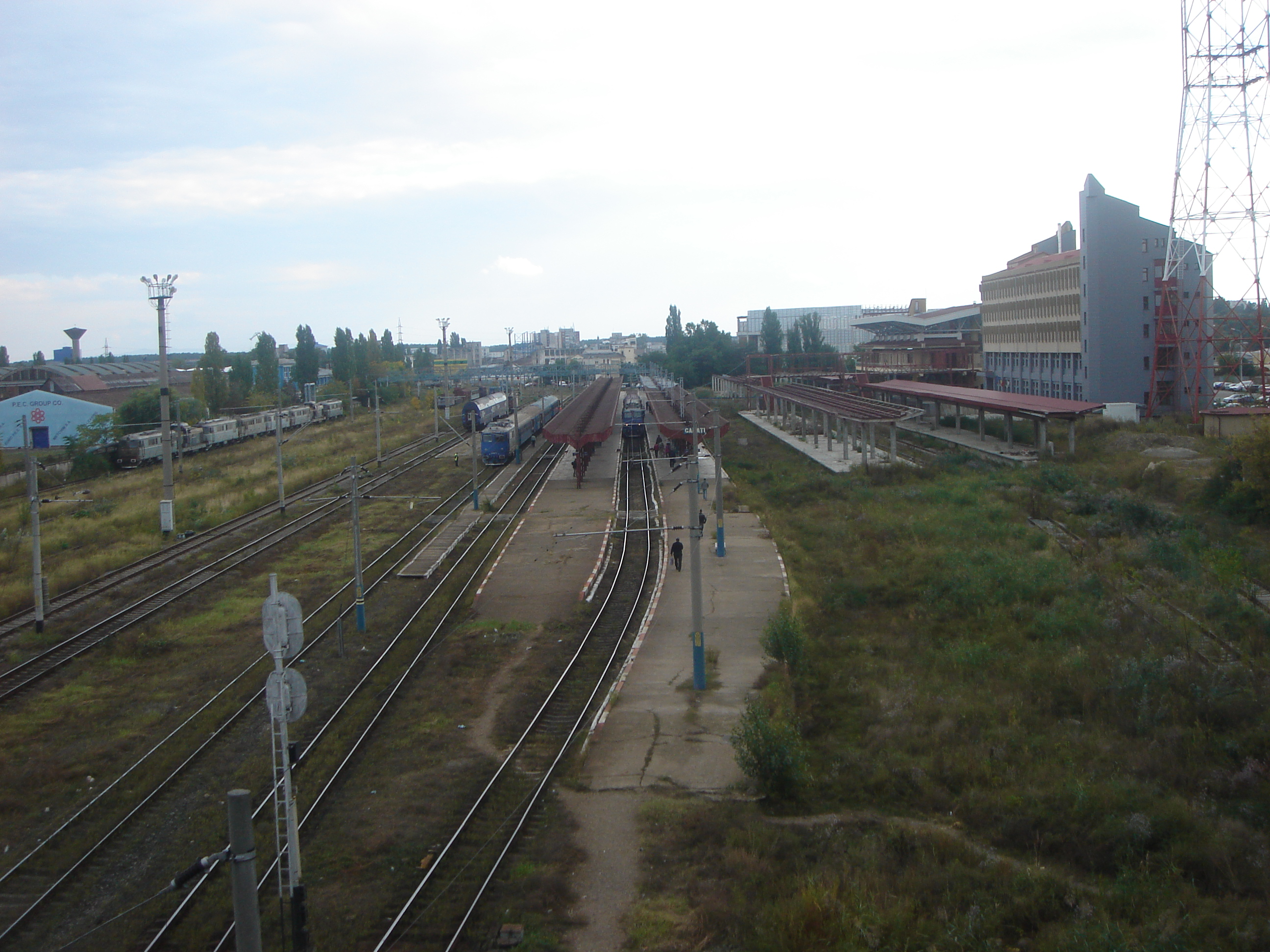
- Galați railway station

General information
- Location: Galați, Galați County, Romania
- Coordinates: 45°26′44″N 28°03′43″E

Services
Preceding station	CFR	Following station
Terminus	CFR Intercity 700	Barboși towards București Nord
Location

Galați is a railway station located in Galați, Galați County, Romania. The station is located on the Galați – Bucharest, Galați – Giurgiulești, Galați – Bârlad, and Galați – Tecuci lines.

== History ==
In June 2014, CFR announced that it would accept tenders of RON 20 million for station rebuilding and reconstruction work at Galați.

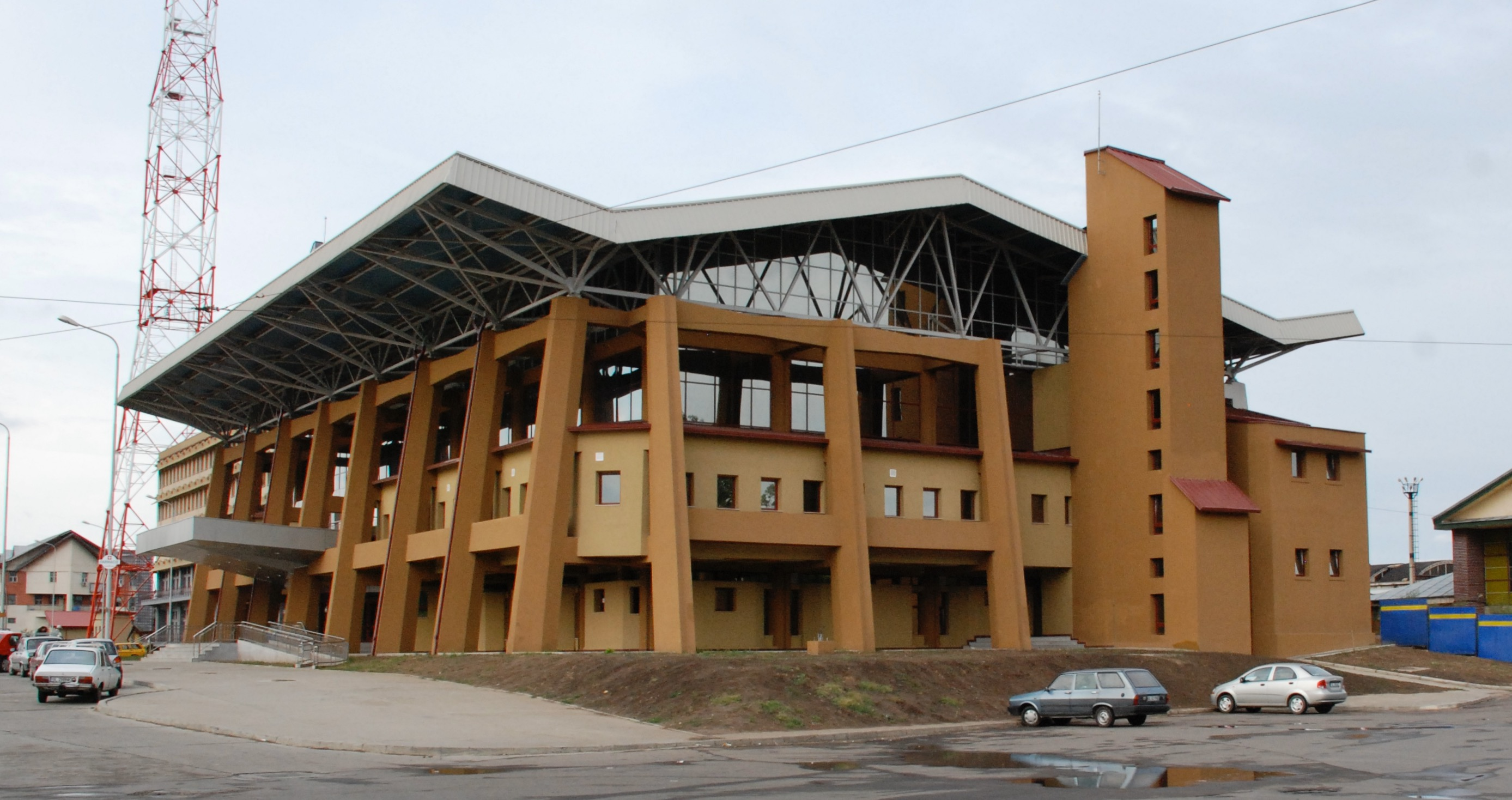
Exterior of station building in 2007

On 25 March 2023, a train crash killed one person and injured three after a locomotive ran into a passenger car at high speed.
