= Daniel Ariciu =

Romanian footballer (1950–2025)

Daniel Ariciu (18 October 1950 – 28 August 2025) was a Romanian footballer who played as a goalkeeper for Argeș Pitești and Baia Mare.

== Life and career ==
Ariciu was born in Berevoiești, Argeș County on 18 October 1950.

In 1972 he won the national championship title with the Argeș Pitești. In 1979, he transferred to Baia Mare before returning to Pitești in 1980.

Ariciu died on 28 August 2025, at the age of 74.
