= Zsolt Kerestely =

Romanian composer and conductor (1934–2026)

- Born: 12 May 1934; Șiclod, Odorhei County, Romania
- Died: 3 March 2026 (aged 91)
- Occupation: Composer
- Notable work: The Tree; The World of Love; The Silent Loves

Zsolt Kerestely (12 May 1934 – 3 March 2026) was a Romanian composer and conductor.

== Life and career ==
Kerestely was born in Șiclod, Odorhei County (now in Harghita County), into an ethnic Hungarian family of Reformed priests. He was a graduate of the Gheorghe Dima Conservatory in Cluj (1963) and a member of the Composers' Union since 1976. His most famous songs include "The Tree" (performed by Aurelian Andreescu), "The World of Love" (performed by Angela Similea) and "The Silent Loves" (Eva Kiss, 1987). In 1985 he composed lyrics for the album "Tainicul vârtej" by the band Florian from Transylvania.

On 25 May 2009 his career was celebrated at the Palace Hall in the show A Life for Music.

== Death ==
Kerestely died on 3 March 2026, at the age of 91.

== Awards ==
- Order of Cultural Merit in the rank of knight, 2004, awarded by the President of Romania Ion Iliescu.
