= Memiş Selciuc =

Romanian saxophonist (1976–2026)

Memiş Selciuc (1978 or 1979 – 11 June 2026) was a Romanian-Turkish saxophonist.

== Life and work ==
Salciuc was based in Constanța, and was considered a legend of Turkish and Balkan saxophone music in Romania. He collaborated with musicians including Adrian Minune and Muharrem Ahmeti.

He died of a heart attack on 11 June 2026, aged 47.
