= Răzvan Ionilă =

Romanian footballer (1982–2025)

Personal information
- Full name: Răzvan Costel Ionilă
- Date of birth: 10 January 1982
- Place of birth: Craiova, Romania
- Date of death: 7 March 2025 (aged 43)
- Height: 1.81 m (5 ft 11 in)
- Position: Defender

Senior career*
Years	Team	Apps	(Gls)
2002–2004	Poli AEK Timișoara	13	(0)
2005–2006	CF Braila	15	(0)
2006	Petrolul Ploiești	15	(0)
2007	Alro Slatina		
2007–2008	Dunărea Galați		
2008–2010	Fortuna Covaci	3 5	(0)
2010–2011	Flacara Faget	21	(15)
2011	Comprest GIM		
2012–2013	Spartak Gottlob		
Total		78	(0)

Managerial career
- 2010–2011: Flacăra Făget
- 2011: Comprest GIM
- 2011: Nuova Mama Mia Becicherecu Mic
- 2013: Flacăra Făget
- 2019–2021: Poli Timișoara (assistant manager)
- * Club domestic league appearances and goals

Răzvan Costel Ionilă (10 January 1982 – 7 March 2025) was a Romanian professional footballer who, while primarily a defender, also played as a defensive midfielder.

== Club career ==
Ionilă made his debut in the Divizia A while playing for Poli AEK Timișoara. After struggling with injuries, he gradually moved towards the lower leagues, making appearances for CF Braila and Petrolul Ploiești, before calling an early end to his professional playing career at the age of 30.

== Managerial career ==
In his late playing career, Ionilă fulfilled the role of player-manager for several lower-league teams, before finally taking on the manager position in 2013 at Flacăra Făget. His focus then moved to coaching juniors football, joining Galaxy Timișoara, the academy of his former teammate, Silviu Bălace. Alongside Bălace, he became assistant manager at Poli Timișoara in 2019.

== Death ==
Ionilă died on 7 March 2025, at the age of 43.
