= 2021 Romanian census =

2021 census held in Romania

2021 Romanian census (RPL2021)
- 1 December 2021 (reference day); 1 February – 31 July 2022 (Note: The census was held in three stages: 1 February – 13 March 2022, the National Institute of Statistics obtains data from administration sources for the census database; 14 March – 27 May 2022, self-assessed CAWI surveying; 31 May – 31 July 2022, face-to-face tablet assisted interviews surveying the remaining people who had not filled out online questionnaires.)

General information
- Country: Romania
- Trial census: 1 February – 31 March 2021
- Authority: INS (Note: National Institute of Statistics (Romanian: Insitutul Național de Statistică).)
- Website: recensamantromania.ro

Results
- Total population: 19,053,815 (▼5.31%)
- Most populous county: Bucharest (1,716,961)
- Least populous county: Tulcea (193,355)

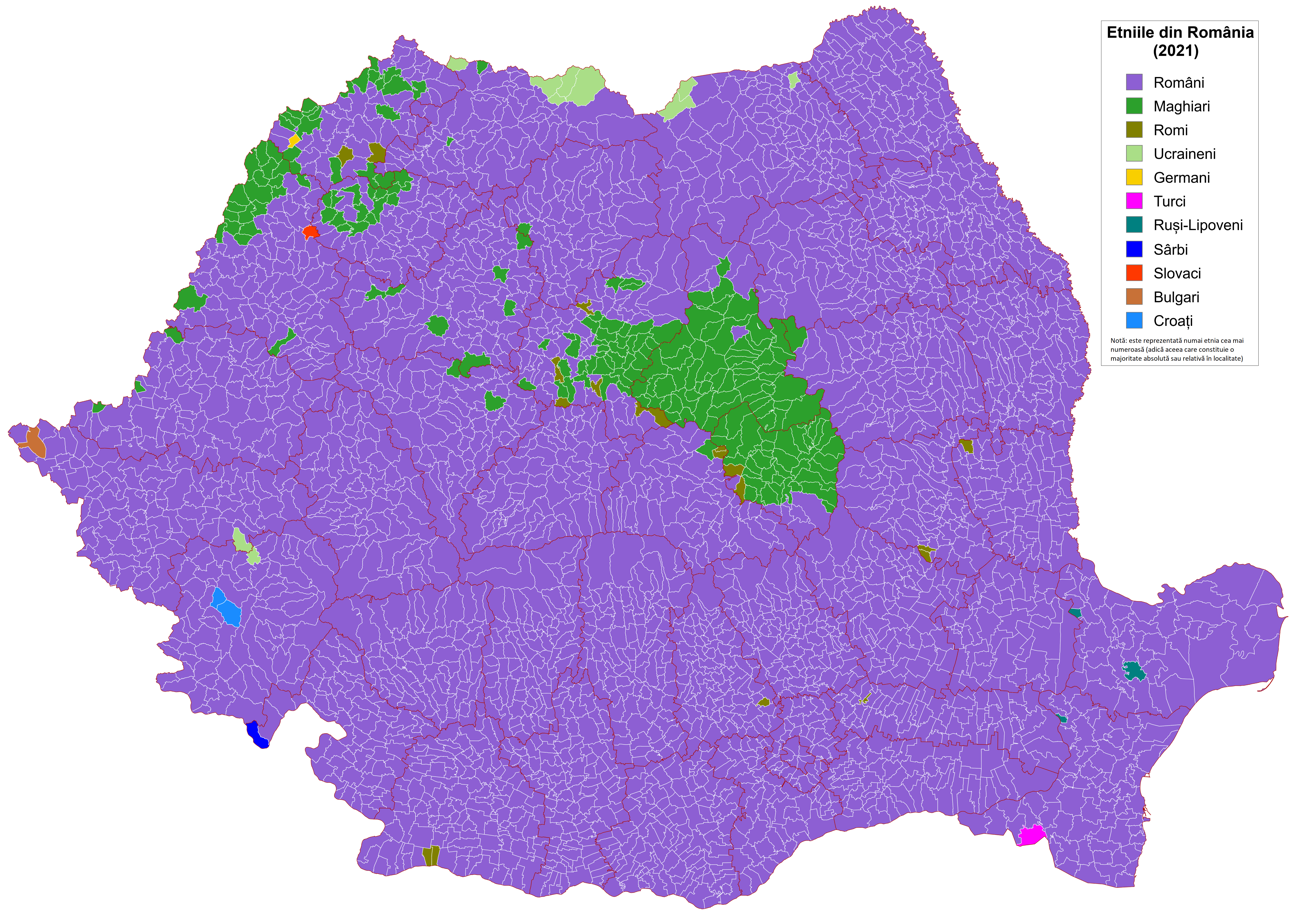
Ethnic map of Romania according to the results of the 2021 census

The 2021 Romanian census (Romanian: Recensământul Populației și Locuințelor 2021 (RPL2021)) was a census held in Romania between 1 February and 31 July 2022, with the reference day for the census data set at 1 December 2021. The census was supposed to be done in 2021, but it was postponed due to the COVID-19 pandemic in Romania in order to avoid census takers from getting infected when coming into contact with ill or quarantined people. It was the first census held in Romania in which data was collected online, something that had support among Romanian youth.

The census was divided into three phases: one in which personal data of the Romanian population was collected from various sites; another in which the population was to complete more precise data such as religion, in which town halls would help the natives of rural areas to answer the census; and a third one in which census takers would go to the homes and households of those who did not register their data online.

Data for this census was planned not to be collected on paper, but instead with tablets so as to maintain social distancing between citizens. The entire data collection process was also relatively long, spanning about 6 months. People who did not provide data by themselves in the early stages of the census were not fined, but those who refused to give or gave false information could be fined between 1,000 and 3,000 Romanian lei.

On 1 August 2022, it was officially announced by the National Institute of Statistics (INS) that as many as 18.15 million Romanian citizens were registered at the RPL2021. Subsequently, the head of the INS announced the first data of the RPL2021 on 5 August 2022, stating that Romania had c. 19 million inhabitants.

The final results regarding demographic characteristics of the RPL2021, published on 31 May 2023, showed a resident population in Romania of 19,053,815 people.

== See also ==
- Demographics of Romania
- Population and housing censuses by country
