= Petru Cadar =

Romanian footballer (1948–2026)

Personal information
- Date of birth: 25 September 1948
- Place of birth: Brașov, Romania
- Date of death: 10 June 2026 (aged 77)
- Position: Central midfielder

Senior career*
Years	Team	Apps	(Gls)
1966–1976	FC Brașov	236	(10)

Managerial career
- Victoria Brașov
- Torpedo Zărnești
- Aripile Ghimbav
- * Club domestic league appearances and goals

Petru Cadar (25 September 1948 – 10 June 2026) was a Romanian footballer who played as a central midfielder.

== Career ==
Cadar played for FC Brașov for 11 years during the 1960s and early 1970s.

== Death ==
Cadar died on 10 June 2026, at the age of 77.
