= Dumitru Gherman =

Romanian politician (1954–2025)

Dumitru Gherman (28 December 1954 – 19 November 2025) was a Romanian politician.

== Life and career ==
Gherman was born in Bratca on 28 December 1954. He served as a deputy (2017–2020), as a PSD MP.

Gherman died from cancer on 19 November 2025, at the age of 70.
