= List of 2026 box office number-one films in Romania =

This is a list of films which have placed number one at the weekend box office in Romania during 2026.

== List ==
#	Weekend End Date	Film	Total Weekend Gross (Romanian leu)	Notes
1	January 4, 2026	Country Love	5,635,112	9th highest weekend gross of all time
2	January 11, 2026	Avatar: Fire and Ash	1,728,285	
3	January 18, 2026	Avatar: Fire and Ash	1,201,899	
4	January 25, 2026	Avatar: Fire and Ash	761,917	
5	February 1, 2026	Avatar: Fire and Ash	512,258	
6	February 8, 2026	Golden Boyz	6,825,575	3rd highest weekend gross of all time
7	February 15, 2026	Golden Boyz	3,279,282	
8	February 22, 2026	Golden Boyz	1,704,313	
9	March 1, 2026	Golden Boyz	1,045,479	
10	March 8, 2026	Hoppers	1,003,531	
11	March 15, 2026	Hoppers	490,046	
12	March 22, 2026	Project Hail Mary	1,509,871	
13	March 29, 2026	Project Hail Mary	1,042,700	
14	April 5, 2026	The Super Mario Galaxy Movie	1,228,011	
15	April 12, 2026	The Super Mario Galaxy Movie	374,203	
16	April 19, 2026	The Super Mario Galaxy Movie	544,716	
17	April 26, 2026	Michael	2,277,406	
18	May 3, 2026	The Devil Wears Prada 2	2,768,362	
19	May 10, 2026	Michael	1,887,602	
20	May 17, 2026	Michael	1,567,718	
21	May 24, 2026	The Mandalorian and Grogu	1,237,667	
22	May 31, 2026	Backrooms	1,389,365	
23	June 7, 2026	Backrooms	718,513	
24	June 14, 2026	Disclosure Day	637,378	
25	June 21, 2026	Toy Story 5	714,159	
26	June 28, 2026	Minions & Monsters	710,948	
27	July 5, 2026	Minions & Monsters	565,398	
28	July 12, 2026	Moana	912,784	
29	July 19, 2026	The Odyssey	2,632,997	
30	July 26, 2026	The Odyssey	2,880,905	
31	August 2, 2026	Spider-Man: Brand New Day	5,712,580	7th highest weekend gross of all time
32	August 9, 2026	Spider-Man: Brand New Day	2,402,442	
33	August 16, 2026	Spider-Man: Brand New Day	1,501,190	
34	August 23, 2026	Spider-Man: Brand New Day	1,002,355	
35	August 30, 2026	Spider-Man: Brand New Day	613,206	
36	September 6, 2026	Spider-Man: Brand New Day	389,542	
37	September 13, 2026	Coyote vs. Acme	562.205	
38	September 20, 2026	Resident Evil	918,388	
39	September 27, 2026	Heart of the Beast	1,012,453	
40	October 4, 2026	Verity	718,136	
41	October 11, 2026	Teambuilding 2	4,574,479	
42	October 18, 2026	Millionaire Boy	3,387,984	
43	October 25, 2026	Millionaire Boy	1,811,386	
44	November 1, 2026	Millionaire Boy	1,018,856	
45	November 8, 2026	All Inclusive Vacation	1,467,858	
46	November 15, 2026	How Could I Live Without You? 2	708,341	

== Highest-grossing films ==
Highest-grossing films of 2026
Rank	Title	Distributor	Total gross
1	The Odyssey	Ro Image 2000	22,282,387
2	Golden Boyz	Vertical Entertainment	21,467,436
3	Spider-Man: Brand New Day	InterComFilm Distribution	20,691,016
4	Michael	Ro Image 2000	16,047,195
5	Country Love	Vidra Distribution	13,550,577
6	Teambuilding 2	Vidra Distribution	12,794,987
7	Millionaire Boy	Bravo Films	9,966,829
8	The Devil Wears Prada 2	Forum Film Romania	7,685,582
9	Project Hail Mary	InterComFilm Distribution	6,638,339
10	The Housemaid	Ro Image 2000	6,497,032
