= Cernătești, Dolj =

Cernătești
- Commune
- Location in Romania
- Coordinates: 44°26′57″N 23°26′01″E
- Country: Romania
- County: Dolj
- Area: 57.24 km^{2} (22.10 sq mi)
- Elevation: 157 m (515 ft)
- Population (2021-12-01): 1,559
  - Density: 27/km^{2} (71/sq mi)
- Time zone: EET/EEST (UTC+2/+3)
- Postal code: 207185
- Vehicle reg.: DJ

Cernătești is a commune in Dolj County, Oltenia, Romania. It is composed of five villages: Cernătești, Cornița, Rasnicu Bătrân, Rasnicu Oghian and Țiu.
