= Marinela Chelaru =

Romanian actress (1959–2025)

Marinela Chelaru (12 July 1959 – 11 October 2025) was a Romanian comic actress and a teacher. She was a member of the Romanian comedy group Vouă and took part in a number of TV and film productions. Before becoming an actress, she worked as a kindergarten teacher for 13 years. Chelaru died in October 2025, at the age of 66.

== Selected filmography ==
- 1996: Craii de Curtea Veche, as Masinca, the matron of a brothel
- 1996: Too Late
- 2003: Ambasadori, căutăm patrie, as cafeteria cook
- 2007:The Rest Is Silence, as gypsy fortune teller
- 2008: Tache, as nurse
- 2010: La bani, la cap, la oase, as Sora Aglae
- 2010: Oul de cuc
