= Vasile Silvian Ciupercă =

Romanian politician (1949–2022)

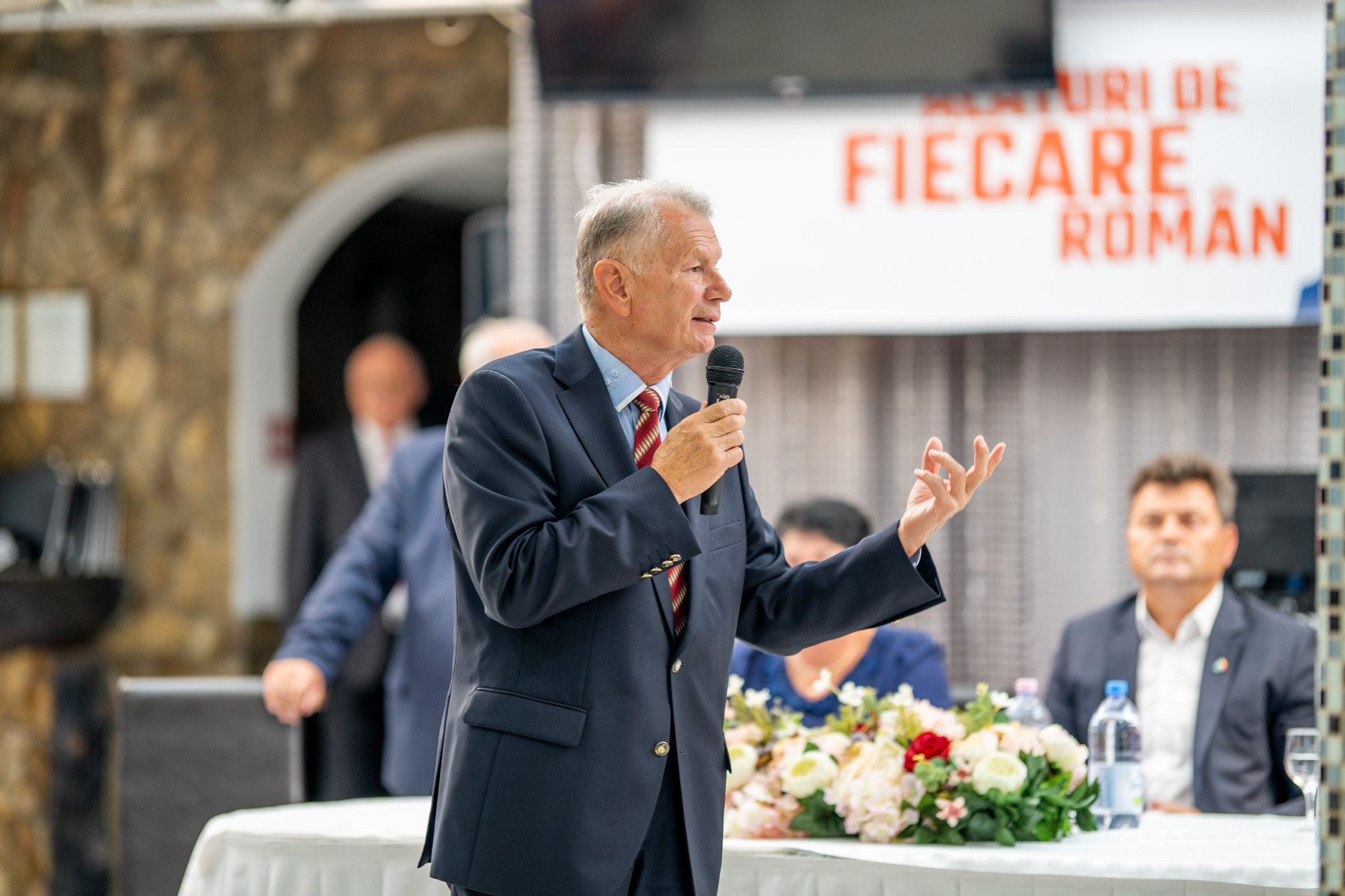
- Ciupercă in 2019

Member of the Chamber of Deputies of Romania
- In office January 2001 – 13 July 2004
- Preceded by: Marian Bălan
- Succeeded by: Aurel Chelbea
- Constituency: Ialomița County

Mayor of Țăndărei
- In office 1996–2000
- Succeeded by: Vasile Sava

Personal details
- Born: 14 July 1949 Buzău, Romanian People's Republic
- Died: 31 July 2022 (aged 73) Vâlcea County, Romania
- Resting place: Țăndărei, Ialomița County, Romania
- Party: PSD
- Education: University of Bucharest
- Occupation: Educator, politician

Vasile Silvian Ciupercă (14 July 1949 – 31 July 2022) was a Romanian politician. A member of the Social Democratic Party, he served in the Chamber of Deputies from 2001 to 2004.

Born in Buzău, he later moved with his family to the town of Țăndărei, in Ialomița County. He went to elementary school and high school in Țăndărei, completing his secondary education in Breaza in 1967. From 1973 he studied at the Faculty of Mathematics of the University of Bucharest, graduating in 1977. He taught at the Țăndărei high school from 1978 to 1996, after which he served as the town's mayor until 2000. After serving in the Chamber of Deputies from 2001 to 2004, he was from 2004 to February 2015 president of the Ialomița County council. On February 10, 2015, he was arrested by the National Anticorruption Directorate on corruption charges. Kept under arrest for 66 days, he was released and sent to trial in June 2015; in May 2017 he was acquitted.

Ciupercă died on 31 July 2022, at the age of 73, while on vacation with relatives in Vâlcea County; he was buried at the Țăndărei Cemetery.
