= National Institute of Statistics (Romania) =

Romanian government institution

The National Institute of Statistics in Bucharest in 2017

The National Institute of Statistics (Romanian: Institutul Național de Statistică, INS) is a Romanian government agency which is responsible for collecting national statistics, in fields such as geography, the economy, demographics and society. The institute is also responsible for conducting Romania's census every ten years, with the latest census being organised in 2022.

== Leadership ==
The head of the NIS is currently Tudorel Andrei, while the three vice-presidents are:

- Ioan-Silviu Vîrva, in charge of economic and social statistics
- Marian Chivu, in charge of national accounts and the dissemination of statistical information
- Beatrix Gered, in charge of IT activities and statistical infrastructure

== History ==
Romania's first official statistics body was the Central Office for Administrative Statistics (Oficiul Central de Statistică Administrativă), established on July 12, 1859, under the reign of Alexandru Ioan Cuza. The organisation, one of the first national statistics organisations in Europe, conducted its first public census between 1859 and 1860.

The Romanian national statistics organisation was known under various names throughout the country's history, as can be seen in the table below:

English name	Romanian name	Period
Central Office for Administrative Statistics	Oficiul Central de Statistică Administrativă	1859–1892
State Directorate for General Statistics	Direcția de Statistică Generală a Statului	1892–1925
State Institute for General Statistics	Institutul de Statistica Generală a Statului	1925–1936
Central Institute of Statistics	Institutul Central de Statistică	1936–1951
Central Directorate of Statistics	Direcția Centrală de Statistică	1951–1989
National Commission for Statistics	Comisia Națională pentru Statistică	1989–1998
National Institute of Statistics and Economic Studies	Institutul Național de Statistică și Studii Economice	1998–2001
National Institute of Statistics	Institutul Național de Statistică	2001–present

== See also ==
- Demographic history of Romania
- Romanian Statistical Yearbook
