= List of Romanian singers =

This is a list of Romanian singers. The list includes both people known in Romania as singers, and singers from other countries who have Romanian ancestry.

== 3 ==
- 3rei Sud Est

== A ==
- Anda Adam
- Olivia Addams
- Adena
- Alexandru Agache
- Akcent
- Alessia
- Nicoleta Alexandru
- Nicu Alifantis
- Radu Almășan
- AMI
- Andra
- Aurelian Andreescu
- Theodor Andrei
- Luminiţa Anghel
- Monica Anghel
- Giulia Anghelescu
- Animal X
- Ovidiu Anton
- Kristaq Antoniu

== B ==
- Ilinca Băcilă
- Andreea Bălan
- Andreea Bănică
- Ștefan Bănică, Jr.
- Ștefan Bănică, Sr.
- Ştefan de la Bărbuleşti
- Agatha Bârsescu
- Doina Badea
- Ramona Badescu
- Mircea Baniciu
- Don Baxter
- Bere Gratis
- Ducu Bertzi
- Victoria Bezetti
- Veta Biriș
- Dan Bittman
- Blaxy Girls
- Florin Bogardo
- Anda-Louise Bogza
- Dan Bordeianu
- Horia Brenciu
- Marius Brenciu
- Nicolae Bretan
- Roxana Briban
- Costel Busuioc
- Maria Butaciu

== C ==
- Carla's Dreams
- Cornelia Catangă
- Maria Cebotari
- Ovidiu Cernăuțeanu
- Elena Cernei
- Cezar
- The Cheeky Girls
- Nicole Cherry
- Florin Chilian
- Corina Chiriac
- Tudor Chirilă
- Maria Ciobanu
- Sandu Ciorba
- Sabina Cojocar
- Sorin Coliban
- Connect-R
- Corina
- Mioara Cortez
- Viorica Cortez
- Zeno Coste
- Ileana Cotrubaș
- Michael Cretu
- Bogdan Curta

== D ==
- Ion Dacian
- Elena Dan
- Hariclea Darclée
- Annamari Dancs
- Diana V
- Gil Dobrică
- Ion Dolănescu
- Ruxandra Donose
- Dida Drăgan

== E ==
- Emaa
- Noni Răzvan Ene
- Alina Eremia

== F ==
- Felicia Donose
- Felicia Filip
- Sonny Flame
- Alex Florea
- Mircea Florian
- Răzvan Fodor
- Killa Fonic
- Maria Forescu
- Florin Salam

== G ==
- G Girls
- Elena Gaja
- Andrei Găluț
- Geneva
- Kamara Ghedi
- Elena Gheorghe
- Tudor Gheorghe
- Angela Gheorghiu
- Maria Gheorghiu
- Teodora Gheorghiu
- Grasu XXL
- Christina Grimmie
- Loredana Groza
- Traian Grozăvescu
- Nicolae Guță

== H ==
- Haiducii
- Anita Hartig
- Rona Hartner
- Pompeiu Hărășteanu
- Heaven
- Nicolae Herlea
- Hi-Q
- Ioan Holender
- Hotel FM
- Holy Molly
- Károly Horváth
- Alexandrina Hristov
- Ștefan Hrușcă
- The Humans

== I ==
- Antonia Iacobescu
- Narcis Iustin Ianău
- Magda Ianculescu
- Ioana Ignat
- Teodor Ilincăi
- Emeric Imre
- Indiggo
- Inna
- Costi Ioniță
- Cristina Iordachescu
- Dan Iordăchescu
- Irina Iordachescu
- Leo Iorga
- Adrian Ivaniţchi
- Stana Izbaşa

== J ==
- Vika Jigulina

== K ==
- Kamelia
- Karmen
- Atilla Kiss B.
- Dalma Kovács
- Marina Krilovici

== L ==
- Sanda Ladoşi
- Lala Band
- Nicolae Leonard
- Anna Lesko
- Irina Loghin
- Lora
- Gabi Luncă

== M ==
- Mandinga
- Mădălina Manole
- Yolanda Marculescu
- Radu Marian
- Vasile Martinoiu
- Delia Matache
- Edward Maya
- Julie Mayaya
- Alexandra Irina Măruță
- Alex Mica
- Ioan Luchian Mihalea
- Ada Milea
- Minelli
- Adrian Minune
- Nelly Miricioiu
- Vlad Miriţă
- Dani Mocanu
- Marius Moga
- Angela Moldovan
- Vasile Moldoveanu
- Morandi
- Jean Moscopol
- Elena Moșuc
- The Motans
- Petre Munteanu
- Silvia Sorina Munteanu

== N ==
- Dana Nălbaru
- Naomy
- Ramona Nerra
- Nico
- Mariana Nicolesco
- George Nicolescu
- Kadriye Nurmambet

== O ==
- Mălina Olinescu

== P ==
- George Papagheorghe
- Parazitii
- Anca Parghel
- Cristina Pasaroiu
- Ioan Gyuri Pascu
- Margareta Pâslaru
- Claudia Pavel
- Marcel Pavel
- Ester Peony
- George Petean
- Gică Petrescu
- Florian Pittiș
- Nelu Ploieșteanu
- Claudia Pop
- Ștefan Pop
- Adela Popescu
- Valeria Peter Predescu
- Romica Puceanu
- Puya

== R ==
- Irina Rimes
- Florin Ristei
- Stella Roman
- Roxen
- Mihaela Runceanu
- Florian Rus

== S ==
- Florin Salam
- Bella Santiago
- Ileana Sărăroiu
- Teodora Sava
- Joseph Schmidt
- Vasile Șeicaru
- Paula Seling
- Carmen Şerban
- Angela Similea
- Dona Dumitru Siminică
- Adrian Sînă
- Smiley
- Victor Socaciu
- Sorana
- Alina Sorescu
- Dan Spătaru
- Spitalul de Urgență
- Alexandra Stan
- Tatiana Stepa
- Ștefan de la Bărbulești
- Laura Stoica
- Georgeta Stoleriu
- Cleopatra Stratan
- Suru Andrei

== T ==
- Tataee
- Maria Tănase
- Taxi
- Elena Theodorini
- Todomondo
- Mihai Traistariu
- Eduard Tumagian
- Aura Twarowska

== U ==
- Tzancă Uraganu
- Andrei Ursu
- Viorica Ursuleac
- Aura Urziceanu

== V ==
- Leontina Vaduva
- Cristian Vasile
- Alex Velea
- Veronika
- Sofia Vicoveanca
- Vali Vijelie
- Nadine Voindrouh
- Voltaj

== W ==
- Ellie White

== X ==
- Xonia

== Z ==
- Adela Zaharia
- Zavaidoc
- Virginia Zeani

== See also ==
- Music of Romania
