= Romani people in Romania =

Roma in Romania
Romii din România (Romanian)
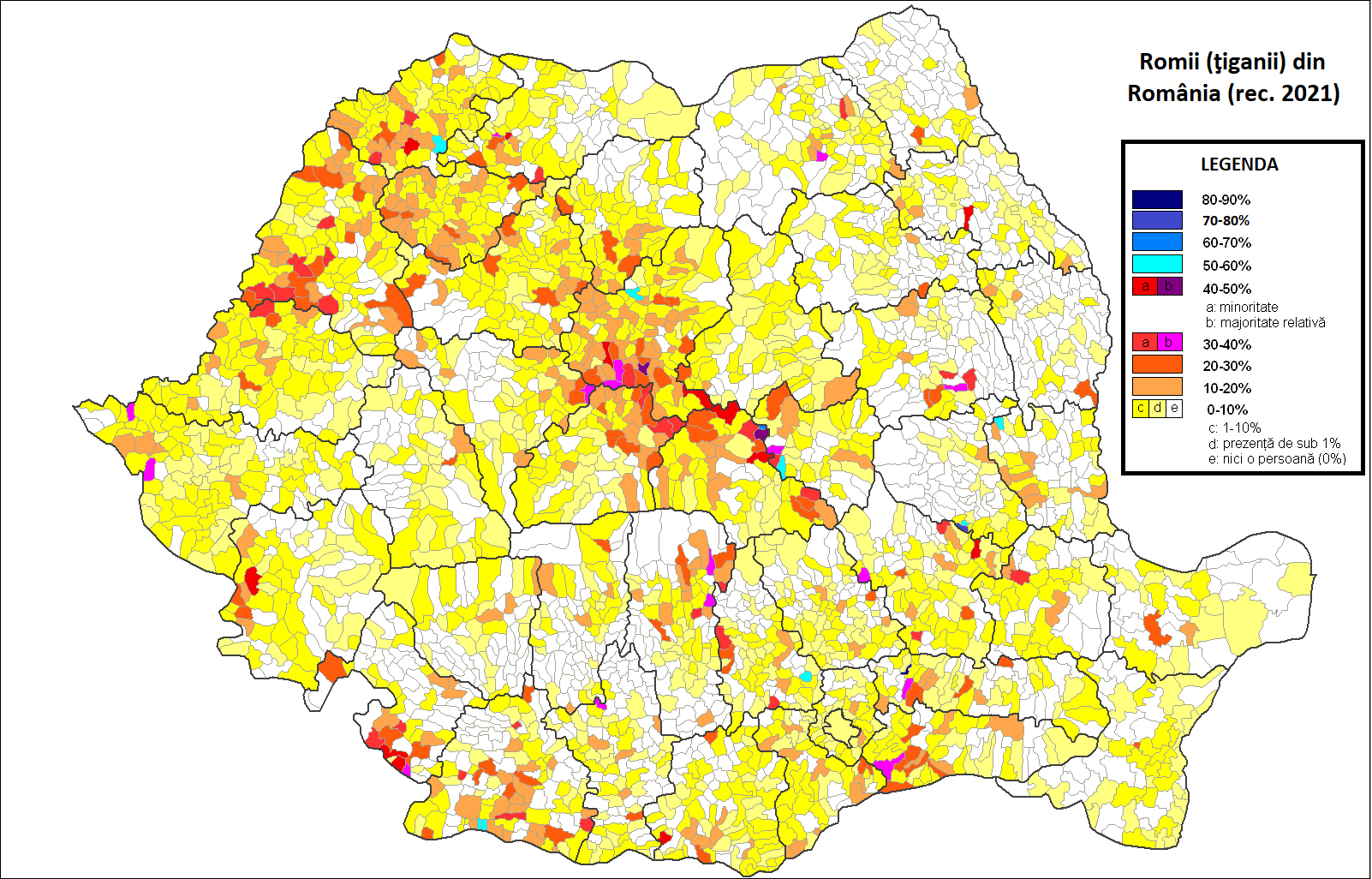
- Percentage of Roma population by municipality (2021)

Total population
- 569,477 (2021 census)

Regions with significant populations
- Wallachia, Bucharest, Moldavia, southeastern Transylvania and Dobrogea

Languages
- Vlax Romani, Carpathian Romani (in Transylvania), Romanian; Also Hungarian (in Transylvania), Bulgarian, German and Turkish (in Dobruja)

Religion
- Orthodoxy; Catholicism; Calvinism; Pentecostalism; Islam; Romani mythology

Related ethnic groups
- Romani people in Moldova

Romani people in Romania, locally and pejoratively referred to as the Țigani (IPA: [t͡siˈɡanʲ]), constitute the second largest ethnic minority in the country behind Hungarians. According to the 2021 census, their number was 569,477 people, constituting 3.4% of the total population.

The real size of the total population of Romani people in Romania is considered to be higher, with different estimates varying from 4.6 percent to over 10 percent of the population, as many Romani do not declare themselves as such. In 2007, the Council of Europe (CoE) estimated that approximately 1.85 million Roma lived in Romania, based on an average between the lowest estimate (1.2 to 2.2 million people) and the highest estimate (1.8 to 2.5 million people) with a maximum percentage of 12%, available at the time; the highest estimate, generated for the year 1991 and originating from a Securitate report, is considered unreliable, and Romanian post-communist censuses have consistently produced far lower figures. CoE's average estimate is equivalent to 8.32% of the population, a figure difficult to verify due to the mobility of Romani and the reluctance of some to disclose their ethnicity.

== Origins ==
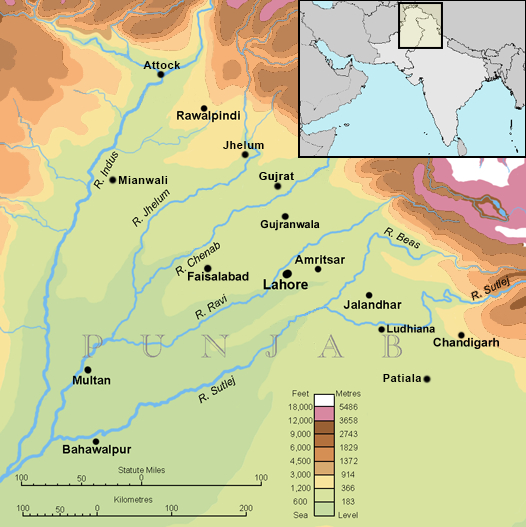
Map showing the region of Punjab

Map showing the Indian state of Rajasthan

Map showing the province of Sindh in Pakistan

Romani people are an Indo-Aryan ethnic group who traditionally lived a nomadic lifestyle. History, genetics and linguistics reveal that the ancestors of the Roma originated in South Asia, likely in the regions of present-day Punjab, Rajasthan and Sindh, which are part of contemporary Northwest India and Pakistan.

The history of their arrival in Romania, around 1370, is presented below.

The linguistic evidence has indisputably shown that roots of Romani language lie in present-day India: the language has grammatical characteristics of Indian languages and shares with them a big part of the basic lexicon, for example, body parts or daily routines. More exactly, Romani shares the basic lexicon with Gujarati, Hindi and Punjabi. It shares many phonetic features with Marwari, while its grammar is closest to Bengali. A 2020 whole-genome study showed that, while Romani people originate from northern India, they also have substantial European Balkan and Middle Eastern admixture, reflecting their migration patterns. According to that study, the Romani common ancestors split from the Punjabi population, in Northwest India, some generations before the diaspora started, over 2,000 years ago.

Genetic findings in 2012 suggest the ancestors of the Roma originated in present-day northwestern India and migrated as a group. According to this study, the ancestors of contemporary scheduled tribes and scheduled caste populations of northern India, traditionally referred to collectively as the Ḍoma (the Indian Sanskrit word डोम (doma) means a member of a Dalit caste of travelling musicians and dancers), are the likely ancestral populations of modern European Roma.

In February 2016, during the International Roma Conference, the Indian Minister of External Affairs stated that the people of the Roma community were children of India. The conference ended with a recommendation to the Government of India to recognize the Roma community spread across 30 countries as a part of the Indian diaspora.

== Terminology ==
Their original name is from the Sanskrit word डोम (doma) and means a member of a Dalit caste of travelling musicians and dancers. The shift from Doma to Roma/Romani is believed to have been influenced by the Greek word Romaios, during the Romanies' arrival and settlement in the Balkans during the Byzantine period. The Byzantine Empire was referred to by its inhabitants as Romanía.

Since the 1990s, the word has also been used officially in the Romanian language, although it was used by Romani activists in Romania as far back as 1933.

Two spellings of the word exist in Romanian: rom (plural romi), and rrom (plural rromi). The first spelling is preferred by the majority of Romani NGOs and it is the only spelling accepted in Romanian Academy's Dicționarul explicativ al limbii române. The two forms reflect the fact that for some speakers of Romani there are two rhotic (ar-like) phonemes: /r/ and /ʀ/. In the government-sponsored (Courthiade) writing system /ʀ/ is spelt rr. The final i in rromi is the Romanian (not Romani) plural.

Depending on context, the traditional and colloquial Romanian name for Romani, "țigani", (Note: cognate with Bulgarian цигани (cigani), Hungarian cigány, Greek ατσίγγανοι (atsinganoi), French tsiganes, Portuguese ciganos, Spanish gitanos, Dutch zigeuner, German Zigeuner, Turkish Çigan, Persian زرگری (zargari), Arabic غجري (ghajri), Italian zingari, Russian цыгане (tsygane), Polish cyganie, Czech cikáni, Kazakh Сыған/ســىــعــان (syǵan), and Slovak cigán) may be considered pejorative in Romania.

In 2009–2010, a media campaign followed by a parliamentary initiative asked the Romanian Parliament to accept a proposal to revert the official name of country's Roma (adopted in 2000) to Țigan (Gypsy), the traditional and colloquial Romanian name for Romani, to avoid the possible confusion among the international community between the words Roma — which refers to the Romani ethnic minority — and Romania. The Romanian government supported the move on the grounds that many countries in the European Union use a variation of the word Țigan to refer to their Gypsy populations. The Romanian upper house, Senate, rejected the proposal.

== History and integration ==
=== Arrival ===
Linguistic and historical data reveal that the Roma arrived in the Balkans during the Byzantine period.

It is probable that the first arrival of Roma in the territory of present-day Romania occurred shortly after 1370, when groups of Roma either migrated or were forcibly transferred north of the Danube, with Roma likely reaching Transylvania, then part of the Kingdom of Hungary, in the final decades of the 14th century. The first written record of Roma in Romanian territory dates to 1385 and is from Wallachia, noting the transfer of a group of Roma to the ownership of the monastery of Prizren, their presence then being documented in Transylvania in 1400, and Moldavia in 1425. It is, however, worth noting that the dates above relate principally to the first arrival of Roma in future Romanian territories, waves of migration from the south continued up until the 18th century, when the northward migration of the Roma, some of whom were Turkish-speaking Muslims, was still occurring.

=== Slavery period ===
Romani in Wallachia and Moldavia were, from their arrival in the region, enslaved, a situation which continued until the emancipations of the mid-19th century. The institution of Romani slavery also existed in Transylvania, especially in regions which had undergone a period of control by Wallachian or Moldavian princes, but the majority of Transylvanian Roma were not slaves. One child of a former Roma slave, Ștefan Răzvan, briefly achieved power in Moldavia, ruling as Voivod for part of the year 1595.

The economic contribution of slavery in the Danubian principalities was immense, yet no economic compensation was ever paid to freed slaves. The current state of social and economic exclusion in Romania has its roots in the ideology and practice of slavery, and therefore its effects are still felt today. Public discussion of Roma slavery remains something of a taboo in modern Romania, no museum of Roma history exists, nor are there any monuments or memorials to slavery. Textbooks and the Romanian school curriculum either minimise this and other aspects of Roma history or exclude it entirely.

There were Romani slaves called laiesi who were permitted to move around the estates performing various tasks such as musicians, farriers, whitewashers, sieve-makers, blacksmiths, and coppersmiths. Romani slaves owned by the Church worked as grooms, cooks, and coachmen; among the household slaves were scopiti, Romani men who were castrated to prevent them from posing a threat to the white noblewomen they served. Field slaves lived in satras, which were groups of reed and mud huts located on the edges of the estates and rarely visited by their owners. They were prohibited from having musical instruments for their own enjoyment and were bought and sold in groups also called satras, cetas, or salases. Groups of Romani slaves were overseen by a vatav or overseer (also known as a ciocoi), who was sometimes extremely cruel. Although the law forbade killing Roma slaves, it was not uncommon. Household Roma slaves were forbidden from speaking their native Romani language, and their descendants, known today as the Boyash, primarily speak a Latin-based Romanian dialect rather than Romani. Roma female household slaves were also given to white visitors for sexual entertainment, and any mixed-race children born from this exploitation automatically became slaves. In the sixteenth century, a Roma child could be bought for the equivalent of 48 cents. Romani women were subjected to rape and sexual abuse by white men, while Romani men who had sexual relations with white women were castrated or burned alive. White Romanian men viewed enslaved Romani women as hypersexualized objects. These women were repeatedly subjected to rape and forced pregnancies by white men, who exploited them to increase their own financial gain and wealth. White Romanian men impregnated and sexually assaulted Romani women as a means to uphold white supremacy. A particular group of enslaved Romani women, called țiitoare (concubines), was established exclusively to offer forced sexual services to their white masters.

Vlad the Impaler owned around 11,000-12,000 Romani slaves.

Romani slaves were given mămăligă to eat. For centuries, cornmeal served as the main food for Roma slaves. Being enslaved, the Roma were frequently tied to the land and endured difficult conditions, with mămăligă providing an inexpensive and reliable source of nourishment for them.

==== Slavery in Wallachia and Moldavia ====
The institution of slavery in Wallachia and Moldavia predated the arrival of the Roma in the region, and was at that time principally applied to groups of Tatars or Cumans resident in the territory. Although initially all the Roma were owned by princes, groups of Roma were very quickly transferred to monasteries or boyars, creating the three groups of Roma slaves; princely slaves, monastery slaves and boyar slaves. Any Gypsy without a master would automatically become a princely slave, and any foreign-born Romani passing through the prince's dominion risked being enslaved. The Tatar component of the slave population disappeared in the second half of the 15th century, fusing into the more numerous Roma population. During this period, the Roma were organised into bands composed of 30-40 families. These bands were delineated by profession and named for the nature of their economic activity, examples include gold-washers (aurari), bear-baiters (ursari), musicians (lăutari), and spoon-makers (lingurari).

Slavery in the Danubian Principalities did not generally signify that Romani or Tatar slaves were forced to remain on the property of their owners. Most Roma remained nomadic but were tied to their owners by certain obligations. Slaves made up the lowest category of society, below the serfs, differing from the latter not in the fact that they were unfree, but in their lack of legal personhood. Slaves were considered wholly property of their owners, and could be transferred, bequeathed, mortgaged or exchanged for goods or services. In addition, any property owned by the slaves could also be appropriated. Slaves could be legally imprisoned or beaten by their masters at any time, but they could not be killed, and slaves resident at the manor of their masters had to be fed and clothed. Some Roma slaves were allowed to travel and earn their own living in exchange for a fixed payment to their owners. Still, the brutality of the slave owners in the Danubian Principalities was well known in Western Europe. Louis-Alexandre de Launay, visiting Wallachia and Moldova, noted that: "the boyars are their absolute masters. At will, they sell them (the Roma) and kill them like cattle. Their children are born slaves regardless of their sex."

Princely slaves were obliged to perform labour for the state and pay special taxes, according to a system based on tradition. These obligations were steadily increased over the period of Roma slavery and were sometimes partially extended to slaves owned by monasteries and boyars. A parallel legal system administered by local Romani leaders and sheriffs existed, as Roma had no access to the law, and any damages caused by Roma to the property or persons of non-Roma were legally the responsibility of their legal owners. Killings of Roma were technically punishable by death, but boyars who killed a slave seem never to have been executed in practice and a Roma who killed another would usually simply be offered to the victim's master as compensation. Although contemporary records do show that Roma slaves were occasionally freed by their masters, this was very unusual.

In the late 18th century, formal legal codes forbidding the separation of married couples were enacted. These codes also prohibited the separation of children from their parents and made marriage between free people and the Roma legal without the enslavement of the non-Roma partner, which had been the practice up to that point. The children of such unions would no longer be considered slaves but free people.

==== Situation of Roma in Late Medieval and Early Modern Transylvania ====
The situation of Roma in Transylvania differed from that in Wallachia and Moldavia as a result of the different political conditions which prevailed there. At the time of the arrival of the first Roma, around 1400, the region formed part of the Kingdom of Hungary, becoming an autonomous principality in the mid-sixteenth century before finally falling under the dominion of the Habsburg monarchy at the end of the 17th century.

The region of Făgăraș, bordering Wallachia, was under the control of the Prince of Wallachia until the end of the 15th century, and therefore the institutions of slavery which pertained in that region were identical to those in Wallachia. There is also evidence that slavery was practiced in those areas which were temporarily under the control of the Prince of Moldavia. The only notable difference from the situation in Wallachia and Moldavia was that as well as the three categories of slaves found in those principalities, Roma were owned by Bran Castle, the ownership of whom was later transferred to the town of Braşov. This special regime of slavery in specific regions of Transylvania continued throughout the period of the autonomous principality, before its final abolition under the Habsburgs in 1783.

However, the majority of Roma in Transylvania were not enslaved, they instead constituted a type of royal serf, with obligations of service and tax owed to the state set at a lower level than the non-Roma population. The Roma were also exempted from military service and enjoyed a degree of toleration for their non-Christian religious practices. The economic role of Romani metal-workers and craftsmen was significant in the rural economy. Many Romanis retained their nomadic lifestyle, enjoying the right to camp on crown land, however, over the centuries part of the population settled in Saxon villages, on the edge of towns, or on the estates of boyars. Those who settled on Boyar estates quickly became serfs and integrated into the local population, while those in towns and villages tended to retain their identity and freedom, albeit as a marginalised group.

In the second half of the 18th century, the Habsburg monarchy undertook a series of measures designed to forcibly assimilate the Roma and suppress their nomadic lifestyle. The most severe of these decrees came in 1783 when the emperor Joseph II implemented a raft of policies which included forbidding the Roma from trading horses, living in tents, speaking Romani or even marrying another Romani person. They also finally emancipated the last slaves in Transylvania. The decrees seem to have rarely been implemented in full, which prevented the cultural extermination of the Roma, but they were very effective in promoting the sedentarisation of Gypsies in those areas of today's Romania then under Habsburg control.

==== Roma slavery immediately prior to emancipation ====
Until the early 19th century, the Roma of Wallachia and Moldavia remained in conditions of slavery that had changed very little since the 14th century, despite the significant changes which had occurred in other sectors of society. Roma slavery was viewed as an integral part of the social system of the principalities, with the Phanariot rulers strongly influenced by the conservatism of their Ottoman suzerains. Following the replacement of the Phanariots with native princes in 1821, Wallachia and Moldova underwent a period of Westernisation and modernisation, eliminating many of the institutions of the ancien régime, but formally enshrining slavery in the founding acts of the principalities.

As part of this modernisation, boyars owning slaves began to exploit their labour more intensively in a more capitalistic fashion. Romani slaves were employed in agricultural tasks during the summer months, which had not been common practice, forced to work on building sites and even in the factories of the nascent industrial sector. Private owners of slaves, monasteries and even the state frequently hired out their slave workforce for large sums of money. This new capitalistic system of exploitation transformed slaves into goods in the full sense of the term, whereas in the past slaves tended to be sold only in extremis, mass auctions of slaves became commonplace. As a result of this new mode of exploitation, the nomadic lifestyle of the Roma of Moldavia and Wallachia was no longer possible, and, like Transylvanian rom, they became a largely sedentary population. The exact slave population of Wallachia and Moldavia at this time is a matter of some debate, but historian Viorel Achim puts the figure at around 400,000, or 7% of the population.

==== Emancipation ====
From the 1830s international and domestic criticism of Roma slavery became increasingly prominent, instigated by events such as the mass slave auctions held in Bucharest. Support for the emancipation of the Roma from within the principalities was marginal in the 1830s, but became generalised among the educated classes in the 1840s, before developing into a well-defined abolitionist movement in the 1850s. Heated debate was conducted in newspapers, with abolitionist voices initially focusing on the material and spiritual poverty endured by the slaves, and the damage this did to the country's image, before adopting arguments based on humanism and liberalism. The economic unproductivity of slave labour was also argued by slavery's critics. During the revolutions of 1848, the Moldavian and Wallachian radicals included abolition of slavery as part of their programmes.

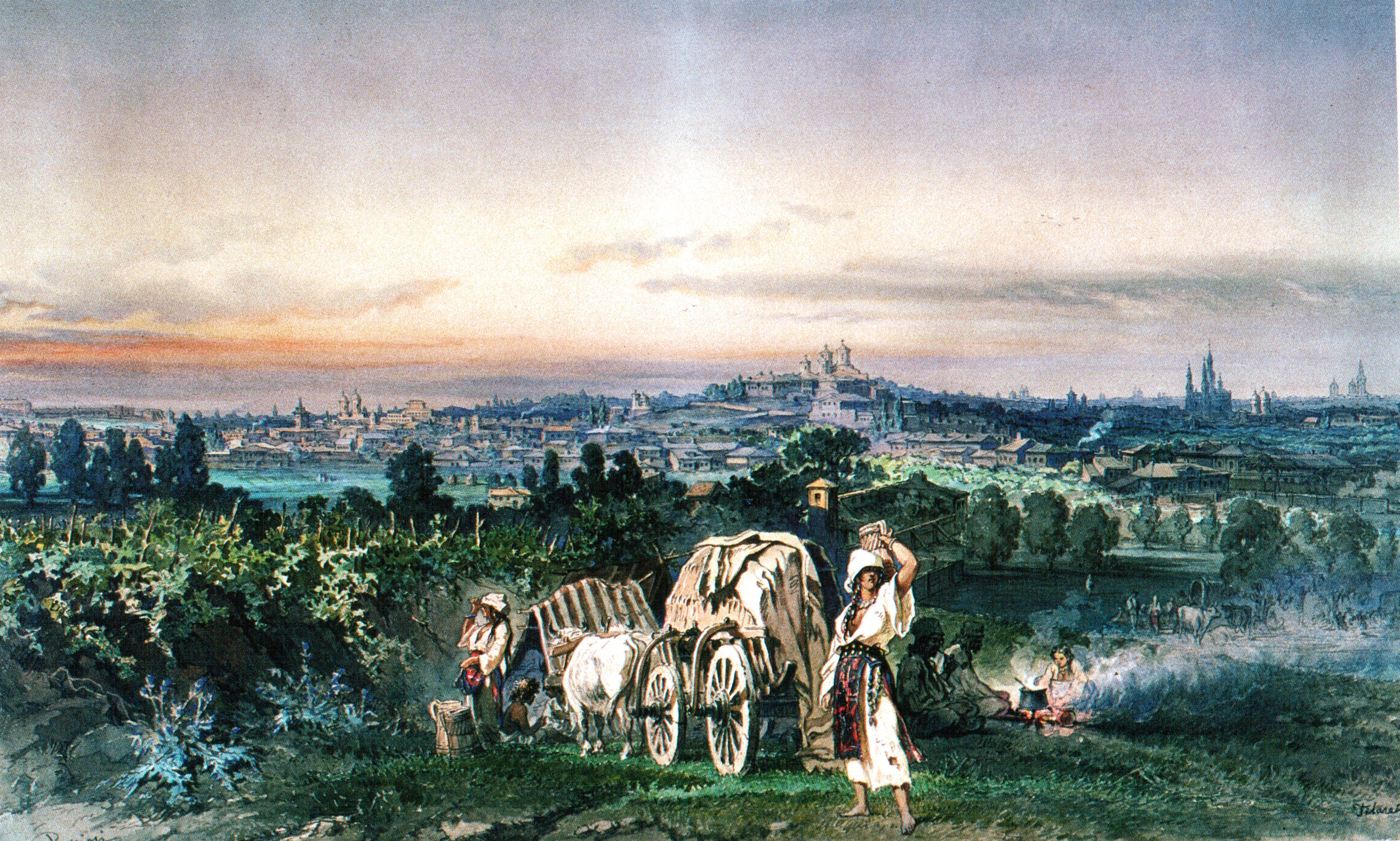
Romani nomads on the outskirts of Bucharest in 1868, by Amedeo Preziosi

The Wallachian state freed its own slaves in 1843, and this was followed by the emancipation of church slaves in 1847. The government of Barbu Dimitrie Știrbei (1849–1856) introduced gradual restrictions of the freedom of private slave-owners to sell or donate slaves. A regulation was introduced in 1850 which forced slave-owners wishing to sell slaves to do so to the state treasury, which would immediately free them. In 1851 a measure allowing the state to compulsorily purchase mistreated slaves was introduced. The final decree of emancipation, entitled "The law for the emancipation of all Gypsies in the Principality of Wallachia", was enacted in February 1856, thereby ending slavery in Wallachia. Slaveowners were compensated 10 ducats for each slave they possessed, with the cost of this purchase to be taken from the tax revenues which would be paid by freed slaves. The law obliged Roma to settle in villages, where they could be more easily taxed, thus forcing the last nomadic Romani to become sedentary.

In Moldavia, the implementation of an emancipation law of 1844 liberated state and church slaves, leaving only boyar slaves in the principality. Prince Grigore Alexandru Ghica emancipated the final Moldavian slaves in 1855, setting different rates of compensation dependent on whether the gypsies were nomadic lăieşi (4 ducats) or settled vătraşi and linguari (8 ducats). No compensation was paid for invalids or babies. As in Wallachia, the compensation was funded by the taxes paid by the liberated monastery and state slaves, but in Moldavia this was topped up with funds collected from the clergy. Some slave owners chose to be compensated in bonds, paying 10% annual interest, or with a 10-year exemption from taxation.

In Bessarabia, annexed by the Russian Empire in 1812, the Roma were liberated in 1861. Many of them migrated to other regions of the Empire, while important communities remained in Soroca, Otaci and the surroundings of Cetatea Albă, Chișinău, and Bălți.

=== From emancipation to 1918 ===
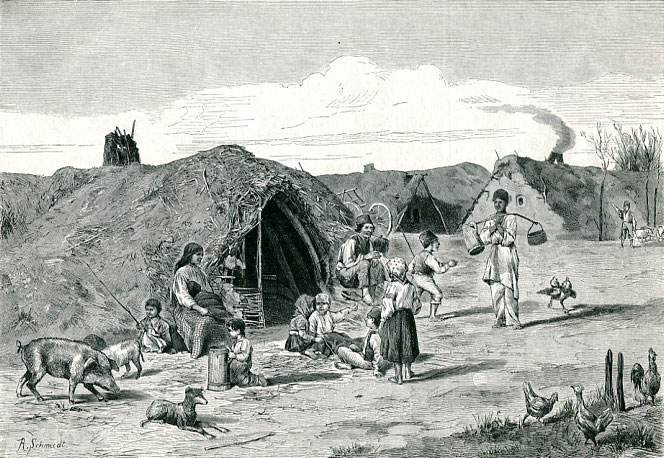
Roma village in Romania after the abolition of slavery, 1884

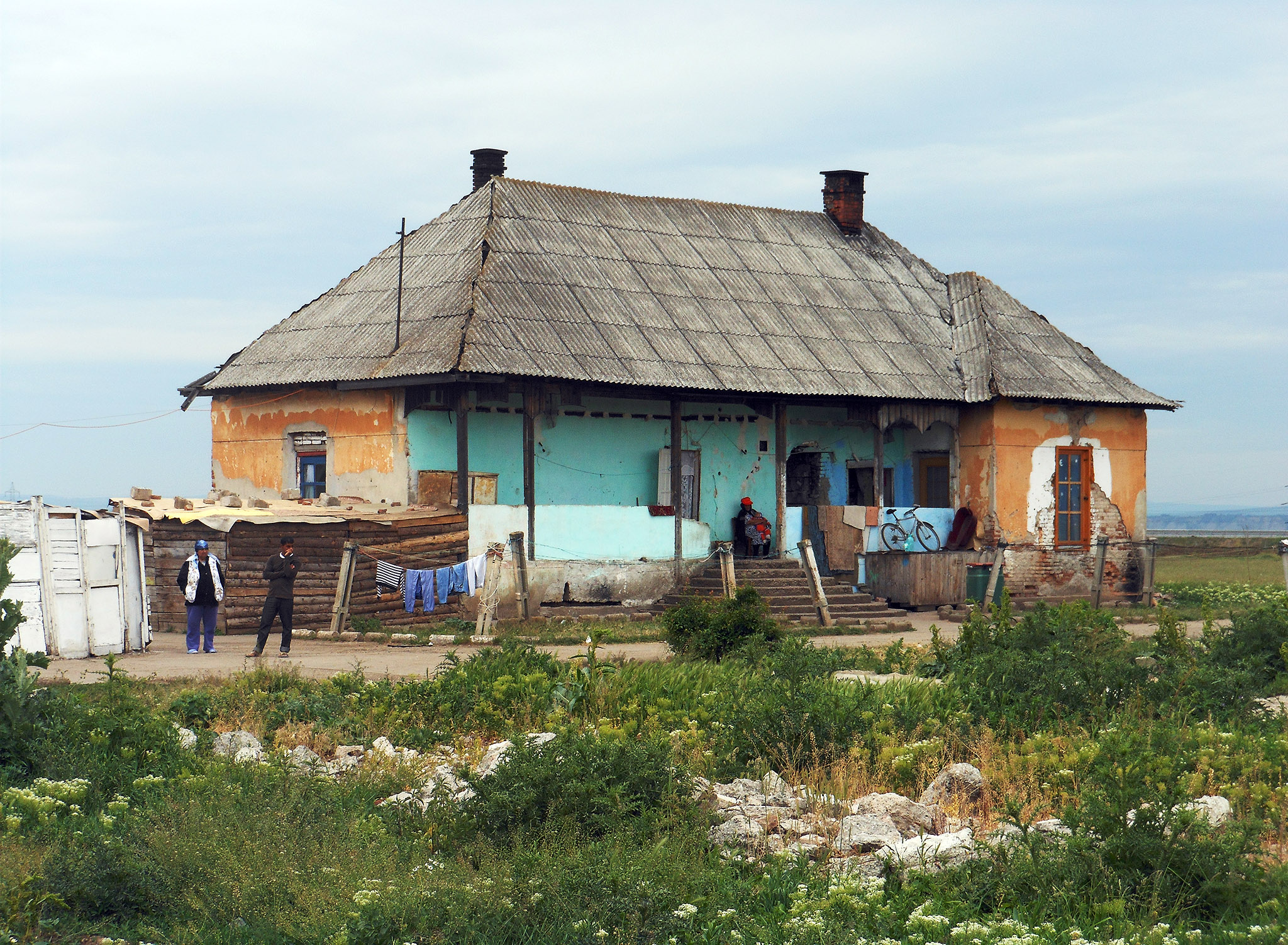
A Roma family home

The liberation of the Roma improved the legal status of Romania's Roma, however, they retained their position as the most marginalised sector of Romanian society. They frequently continued to work for the same masters, without significant improvement to their material conditions. Roma who did not continue to labour for their former owners often suffered great economic hardship, imprisonment and death from hunger being frequent outcomes. During the first thirty years following liberation, a notable phenomenon of urbanisation occurred, with many Roma who were expelled from their former owners' estates, or who did not wish to adopt a lifestyle which would thrust them into poverty, migrating to towns. This contrasted the situation noted in some other groups of Roma, who adapted fully to this new condition and assimilated into the peasant population, losing their status as Roma both culturally and officially.

The social upheaval of emancipation led to mass Romani emigration from Romanian territory, initially into the Austro-Hungarian empire and thence to Western Europe, Poland, the Russian Empire, Scandinavia and the Americas. This migration was the primary origin of the Vlax Roma populations found worldwide today, although it is likely that some Vlax groups may have migrated out of Romania prior to emancipation. This pattern of Roma emigration continued until after the First World War, with Roma in Bavaria recorded as carrying Romanian passports in the 1920s.

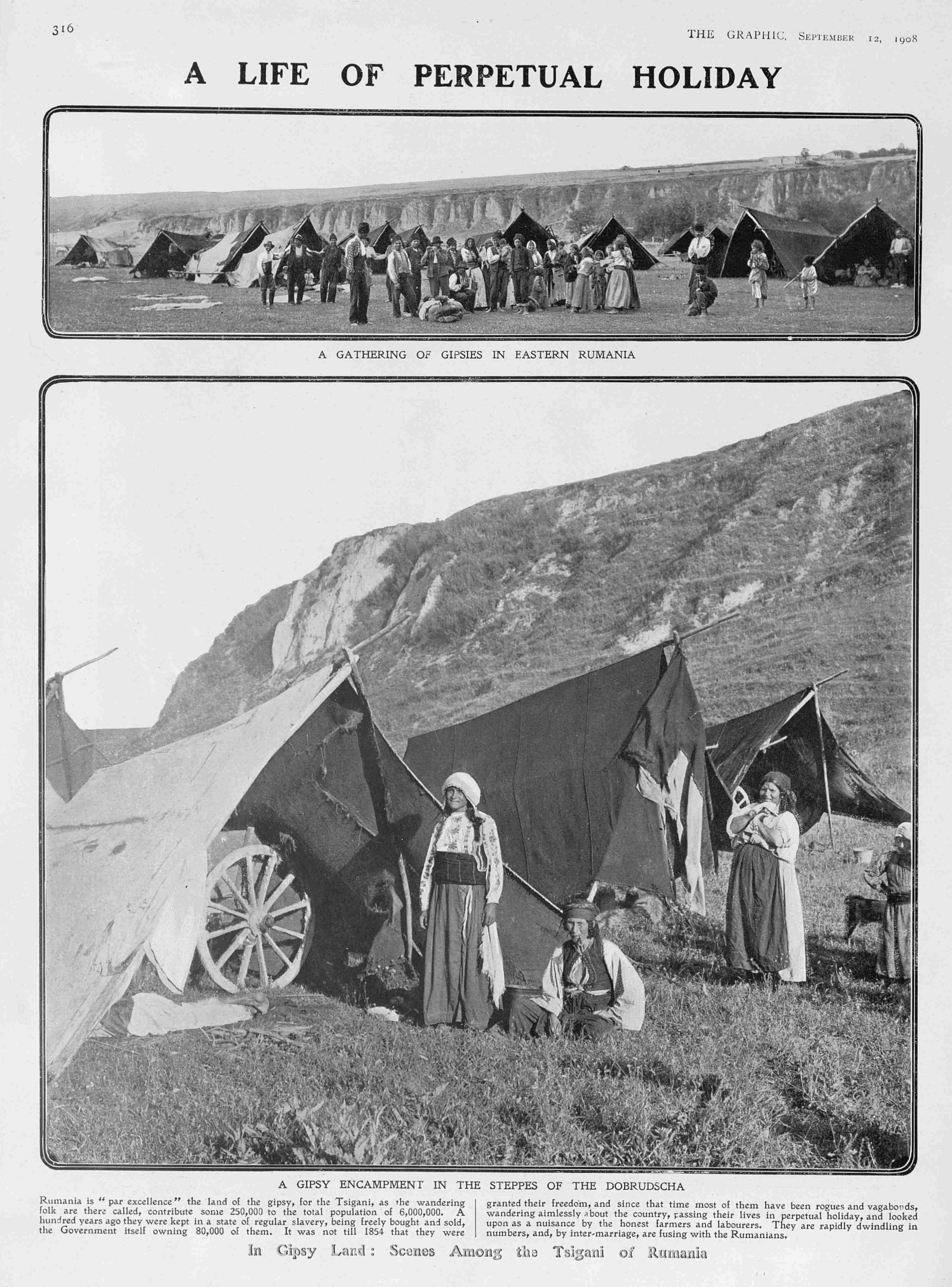
"Scenes Among the Tsigani of Rumania", clipping from newspaper, The Graphic, 1908

The result of these processes of assimilation and emigration was a relative decline in the percentage of Roma inhabitants resident in Moldavia, Wallachia and Bessarabia. At the time of emancipation, the proportion of the populations of Moldavia and Wallachia who had been slaves was around 7%, between 200,000 and 250,000 people. By the last decade of the 19th century the number of Roma is estimated to have grown to between 250,000 and 300,000, 4-5% of the population.

In 1893, the Hungarian authorities carried out a census of Transylvanian Roma which provides a wealth of information on their social and economic situation in the late 19th century. There is evidence for a similar process of assimilation into the general population as was occurring in Moldavia and Wallachia, with Romani groups adopting a Romanian, Hungarian, Székely or Saxon ethnic identity. However, there is also evidence of Roma retaining their specific identity, even when they had abandoned the Romani language: the census records that 38.1% of Transylvanian Roma spoke Hungarian as their mother tongue, 29.97% spoke Romani, 24.39% spoke Romanian, with smaller numbers speaking Slavic languages or German. Though a largely rural population, Transylvanian Roma were rarely involved in agriculture, more commonly working as artisans or craftsmen, with nomadism almost eliminated by this date.

=== The inter-war period ===
After the First World War, Greater Romania was established which included Transylvania, Banat, Bukovina and Bessarabia and other territories which increased the number of ethnic Romani in Romania. However, despite this increase in the absolute number of Roma in the country, the decline in the relative proportion of Roma within Romania continued. The first census in interwar Romania took place in 1930; 242,656 persons (1.6%) were registered as (țigani), this number was lower than the figures recorded in the late 19th century, although it was almost certainly much lower than the real figure. The reason for this relative decline was the continued gradual assimilation of Roma to a Romanian or Hungarian ethnic identity, linked to the status of peasants or smallholder, a process which was accelerated by the land reform carried out following the war.

The traditional Roma economic activities of metalwork and crafts became less tenable during this period, as ethnic Romanians began to adopt trades such as woodworking and competition from manufactured goods increased. The few Roma who retained a nomadic lifestyle tended to abandon their traditional crafts and adopt the role of pedlars, and their traditional lifestyle was made very difficult by police refusal to allow them to camp near villages. These economic and social changes reduced the strength of the traditional clan system and, despite the social and linguistic differences between Roma groups, fostered a common Roma identity.

The period of Romanian democracy, between 1918 and 1938, led to a flowering of Romani cultural, social, and political organisations. In 1933, two competing national Roma representative bodies were founded, the General Association of Gypsies in Romania and the General Union of Roma in Romania. These two organisations were bitter rivals who vied for members and whose leaders launched bitter attacks on each other, with the latter, under the leadership of the self-declared Roma Voivode Gheorghe Niculescu, emerging as the only truly national force. The organisation's stated aim was "the emancipation and reawakening of the Roma nation" so that Roma could live alongside their compatriots "without being ashamed".

The General Union of Roma in Romania enjoyed some successes before its suppression in 1941, even continuing to function to a degree after the establishment of a Royal Dictatorship in 1938. Land was obtained for nomadic Roma, church marriages were organised to legally and spiritually formalise Roma couples, and legal and medical services were provided to Roma. They also convinced the government to allow the Roma freedom of movement within the national territory in order to allow them to practice their trades.

The Royal Dictatorship of Carol II, from 1938 to 1940, adopted discriminatory policies against Jewish Romanians and other national minorities. The strongest anti-Roma attitudes of the 1918-1940 period were found not in politics, but in Academia. Scientific racism was rooted in university departments dedicated to Eugenics and biopolitics, which viewed Romani and Jewish people as a "bioethnic danger" to the Romanian nation. These views would come to the fore politically during the dictatorship of Ion Antonescu (1940–1944).

=== Persecution during World War II ===
During 1940, Romania was forced to cede territory to Hungary and the Soviet Union, an event which led to the military coup which installed general Ion Antonescu, first in concert with the fascist Iron Guard, and later as a predominantly military fascist dictatorship allied with Nazi Germany. Antonescu persecuted Roma with increasing severity until the invasion of Romania by the Soviets and his overthrow by the King in 1944. During the Second World War, the regime deported 25,000 Romani to Transnistria; of these many thousands died, with estimates of the exact number ranging from 11,000 to 12,500. In all, from the territory of present-day Romania (including Northern Transylvania), 36,000 Romani perished during that time. The mistreatment of Romania Roma during World War II has received scant attention from Romanian historians, despite the wide-ranging historical literature detailing the history of the Antonescu regime.

==== Deportations to Transnistria ====
The anti-Roma discourse which had been present in Romanian academia during the 1930s became more prominent as an intellectual current after 1940, with academics who had never previously expressed anti-Roma views now doing so, and eugenicists making more radical demands such as the sterilisation of Roma people to protect Romania's ethnic purity. These views also found expression in the ideology of the "legionary" Iron Guard, who followed the scientists in identifying a "Gypsy Problem" in Romania, however, they were suppressed in January 1941 before any serious anti-roma measures had been enacted. Antonescu's post-legionary regime's declared goal was the "Romanianisation" of Romania's territory, through the ethnic cleansing of minorities, especially Jewish and Roma.

Although it appears that Antonescu initially planned the staged deportation of the entire Roma population to Transnistria, Soviet territory occupied by Romania, only the first stage was ever carried out. The initial wave was composed of Roma who the regime considered a "problem", in May 1942, a police survey was conducted to identify any Romani person without a clear occupation or with criminal convictions, difficulty supporting themself, or any practiced nomadism. Immediately following the survey, any Romani person who fell into any of these categories would be forbidden from leaving their county of residence. The deportation of these individuals and their families was justified on the pretext of combatting criminality occurring during blackouts.

The transportation of all nomadic Romanian Roma was carried out between June and August 1942, and was composed of 11,441 people, 6714 of them children. This deportation also included those nomadic Roma serving in the army, who were returned from the front for transportation. The expulsion of sedentary Roma occurred during September 1942 and was incomplete, including only 12,497 of the 31,438 individuals recorded in the police survey. This group consisted of Roma who were categorised as "dangerous and undesirable" and excluded any romani person who had been mobilised by the military and their families.

The September deportations, which occurred by train, were chaotic and often included individuals who were not intended to be deported, or in some cases, who were not even Roma. Cases were reported of theft and exploitative purchases of goods by police and gendarmes, and the deportees were not permitted to carry sufficient goods for survival in Transnistria. Despite the order to respect family members of serving soldiers, many were deported, leading to protests by Romani soldiers and complaints from the army hierarchy. As well as smaller expulsions in late September and early October, there was some repatriation of individuals and families who had been deported in error, before the deportation of the Roma was halted on 14 October 1942, due to its unpopularity.

Deported Roma were generally settled on the edges of villages in the counties of Golta, Ochakov, Balta and Berezovka, their settlement frequently necessitating the eviction of Ukrainian residents who were billeted in the houses of their neighbours. The economic activity of the Roma was, theoretically, organised systematically by the state, however, in reality there was insufficient demand for labour to occupy them and they were unable to sustain themselves through work. Their high concentration in specific locations resulted in food shortages, as the local occupying authorities had insufficient resources to feed the deportees. The deported Roma suffered great hardship from the beginning due to cold and lack of food, with a high mortality rate being notable from the very beginning of the period of deportation. On occasions Roma colonies received no food rations for weeks on end, and as no clothing was issued to supplement the insufficient supply they had been allowed to bring with them, the Ukrainian winter caused much suffering and many deaths, while healthcare was practically non-existent.

The number of dead from cold and hunger among the transported Roma can not be securely calculated, as no reliable contemporary statistics exist. Transnistria was evacuated by the Romanian army in early 1944, in the face of the advancing Soviet forces. Some Roma travelled back to Romania, whereas others remained in Soviet territory, from where they were likely dispersed into other regions, a factor which makes exact calculations of mortality among the transportees very difficult. Romanian historian Viorel Achim puts the number of dead at around half of those transported, roughly 12,500 people, whereas the International Commission on the Holocaust in Romania gives an estimate of 11,000.

==== The Roma of Southern Dobruja ====
A small minority of Roma live in Dobruja along with ethnic Turks and Tatars. Turks and Tatars consider them not particularly devout Muslims. These Roma have connections with Turks over the centuries and speak Turkish.

==== The Roma of Northern Transylvania during the Second World war ====
In August 1940, as part of the Second Vienna Award, control of Northern Transylvania, including of all of Maramureș and part of Crișana, was transferred to Hungary. Discrimination by Hungary against Roma had been common throughout the 1930s, and biannual police raids on Romani settlements were mandated by law. During the course of the war, Hungarian Roma were progressively expelled from urban areas or forced to live in ghettoes.

In March 1944, Hungary was occupied by Nazi Germany, Hungary stepped up its persecution of the Roma and Jewish population, with countless Jewish people deported to concentration camps and many Roma organised into forced labour battalions. Following the replacement in late 1944 of the Horthy government with that of the Arrow Cross Party, the mass deportation of Roma to concentration camps began. Initially the victims were transported to local Hungarian labour camps, from which many were later transferred to Dachau. Massacres of gypsies also occurred in various localities, including one occurring in Nagyszalonta (Salonta) now in Romania.

Of a population of around 100,000 Roma in Hungary, around 50,000 were subjected to forced labour. While the total number of Roma killed in Hungary is still a matter of academic debate, the Columbia Guide to the Holocaust puts the figure at 28,000.

=== During the communist regime and after 1989 ===
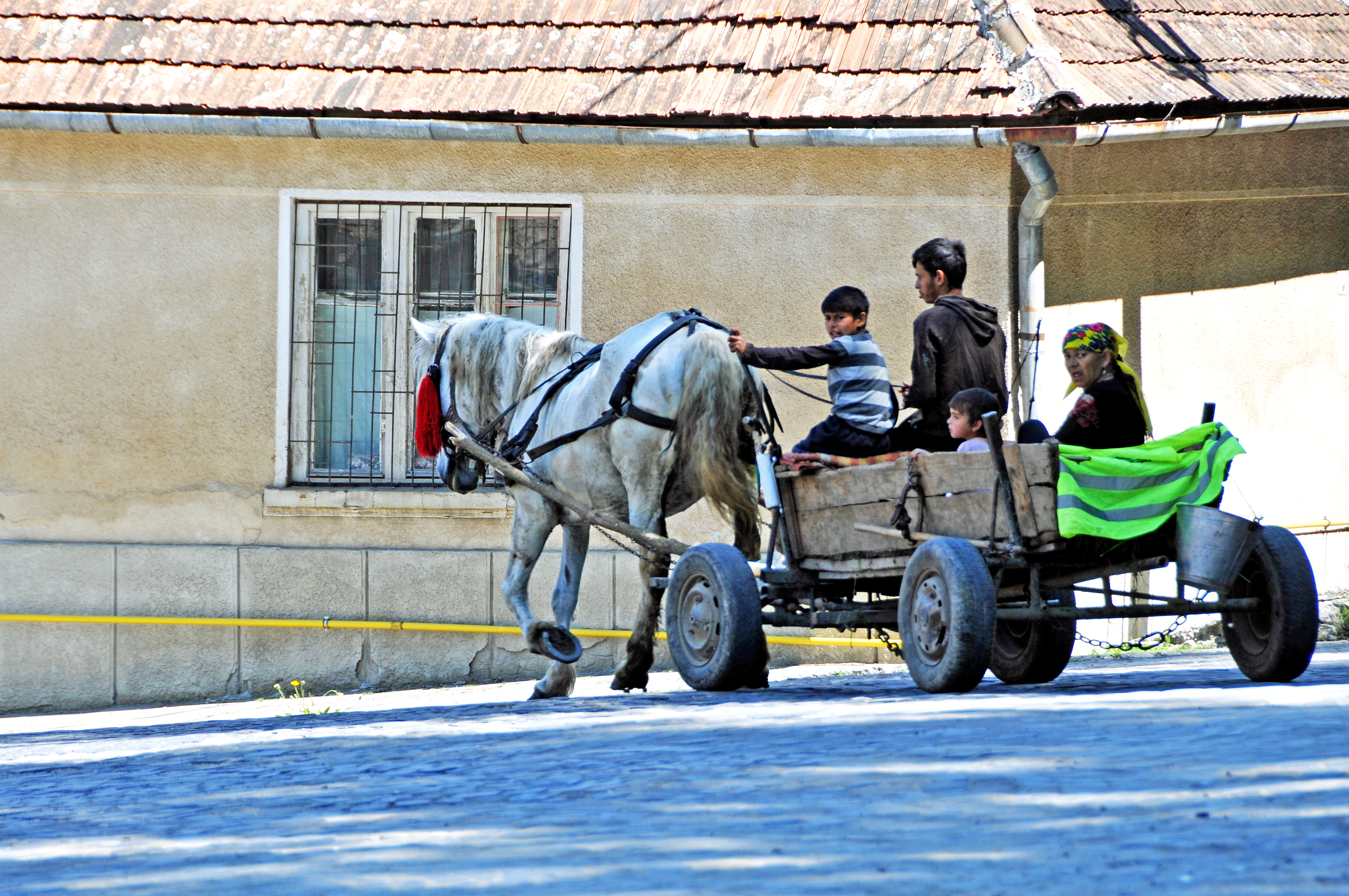
A Roma family travelling by wagon

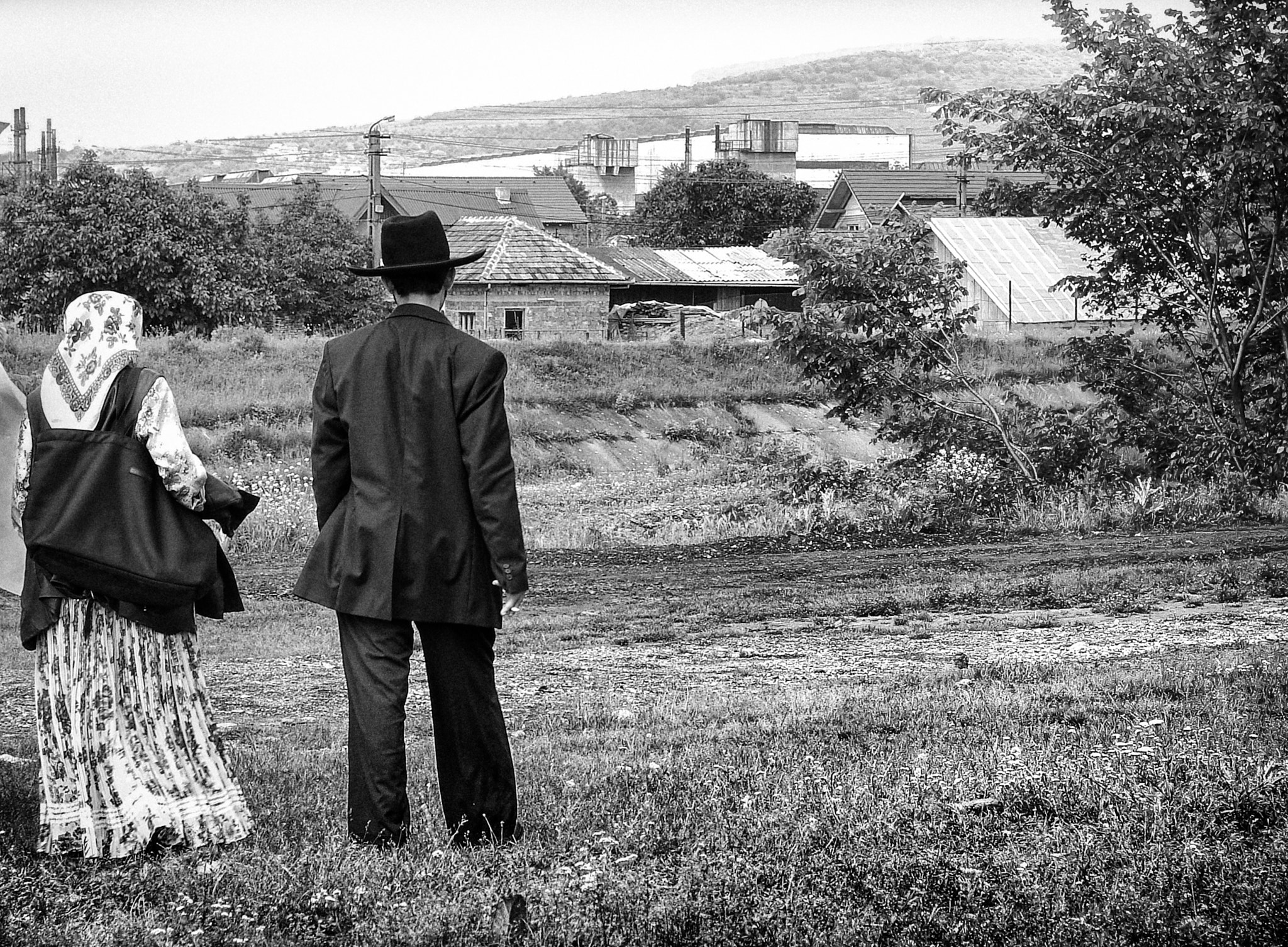
A Roma couple

Sometimes the authorities tried to cover up crimes related to racial hatred, so as not to raise the social tension. An example of this is the crime committed by a truck driver named Eugen Grigore, from Iași who, in 1974, to avenge the death of his wife and his three children caused by a group of Roma, drove his truck into a Roma camp, killing 24 people. This fact was made public only in the 2000s.

The Communist regime implemented forceful assimilation policies targeting the Romani people. The Romani were compelled to settle, relinquishing their traditional trades such as metalworking, jewelry crafting, and carpentry, and were predominantly employed in agricultural collectives.

After the fall of communism in Romania, there were many inter-ethnic conflicts targeting the Roma community, the most famous being the 1993 Hădăreni riots. Other important clashes against Roma happened, from 1989 to 2011, in Turulung, Vârghiș, Cuza Vodă, Bolintin-Deal, Ogrezeni, Reghin, Cărpiniş, Găiseni, Plăieşii de Sus, Vălenii Lăpuşului, Racşa, Valea Largă, Apața, Sânmartin, Sâncrăieni and Racoş. During the June 1990 Mineriad, a group of protesters organized a pogrom in the Roma neighborhoods of Bucharest. According to the press, the raids resulted in the destruction of apartments and houses, beatings of men and assaults of women of Roma ethnicity.

Many politicians have also made some offensive statements against the Roma people, such as the president of that time Traian Băsescu, who, in 2007, called a Roma journalist "stinky Gypsy". Later in 2020, during a TV show, Băsescu expressed objections about the use of the term "Roma" instead of "Gypsy", which according to him was "artificially created during the 90s" and "produces confusion with Romanians living abroad". He added that the Roma people created a bad image of Romania, and that the "(criminal) Gypsy groups need to understand that they cannot be tolerated with their way of life". Following these affirmations, the CNCD fined him.

In November 2011, the mayor of the city of Baia Mare, Cătălin Cherecheș, decided to build a wall in a neighborhood inhabited by a Roma community. The National Anti-Discrimination Council fined the mayor in 2011 and in 2020 for not demolishing the wall, despite the several orders in this regard. Also in 2020, the mayor of Târgu Mureș, Dorin Florea, complained that Mureș County has the biggest number of Roma and that they are "a serious problem for Romania". Sorin Lavric, a senator member of the far-right AUR party, stated that the Roma are "a social plague".

A 2000 EU report about Romani said that in Romania... the continued high levels of discrimination are a serious concern.. and progress has been limited to programmes aimed at improving access to education.

Various international institutions, such as the World Bank, the Council of Europe Development Bank (CEB), and the Open Society Institute (OSI) launched the 2005-2015 Decade for Roma Inclusion. To this, followed the EU Decade of Roma Inclusion to combat this and other problems. The integration of the Roma is made difficult also due to a great economic and social disparity; according to the 2002 census, Roma are the ethnic group with the highest percentage of illiteracy (25.6%), with only the Turkish minority having a similarly high percentage (23.7%). Within the Romanian education system there is discrimination and segregation, which leads to higher drop-out rates and lower qualifications for the Romani students. The life expectancy of the Romani minority is also 10 years lower than the Romanian average.

The accession of Romania to the European Union in 2007 led many members of the Romani minority, the most socially disadvantaged ethnic group in Romania, to migrate en masse to various Western European countries (mostly to Spain, Italy, Austria, Germany, France, Belgium, United Kingdom, Sweden) hoping to find a better life. The exact number of emigrants is unknown. In 2007 Florin Cioabă, an important leader of the Romani community (also known as the "King of all Gypsies") declared in an interview that he worried that Romania may lose its Romani minority. However, the next population census in 2011 showed a substantial rise in those recording Romani ethnicity.

According to some studies, Roma people make 17% of the adult prison population and 40% of the juvenile inmates in Romania. This over-representation makes this group a favorite target for mass media attacks and discriminatory practices. Another study conducted in six Romanian prisons found that 21% of the inmates were Roma, many more than expected based on any official or unofficial statistics on ethnic composition.

The Pro Democrația association in Romania revealed that 94% of the questioned persons believe that the Romanian citizenship should be revoked to the ethnic Roms who commit crimes abroad. Another survey revealed that 68% of Romanians think that Roma people commit most crimes, 46% think that they are thieves, while 43% lazy and dirty, and 36% believe that the Roma community might become a threat to Romania.

In another survey made in 2013 by IRES, 57% respondents stated that they generally don't trust people of Roma ancestry and only 17% said to have a Roma friend. Still, 57% said that this ethnic group is not discriminated in Romania, 59% claimed that the Roma should not receive help from the state, and that Roma people are poor because they don't like to work (72%) and that most of them are thugs (61%). IRES published in 2020 a survey which revealed that 72% of Romanians don't trust Roma people and have a negative opinion about them.

In the context of the 2022 Russian invasion of Ukraine, there are some reports of discrimination against Ukrainian Roma who took refuge in Romania.

== Demographics ==
Historical population
Year	Pop.	±%
1887	200,000	—
1930	262,501	+31.3%
1948	53,425	−79.6%
1956	104,216	+95.1%
1966	64,197	−38.4%
1977	227,398	+254.2%
1992	401,087	+76.4%
2002	535,140	+33.4%
2011	621,573	+16.2%
2022	569,477	−8.4%

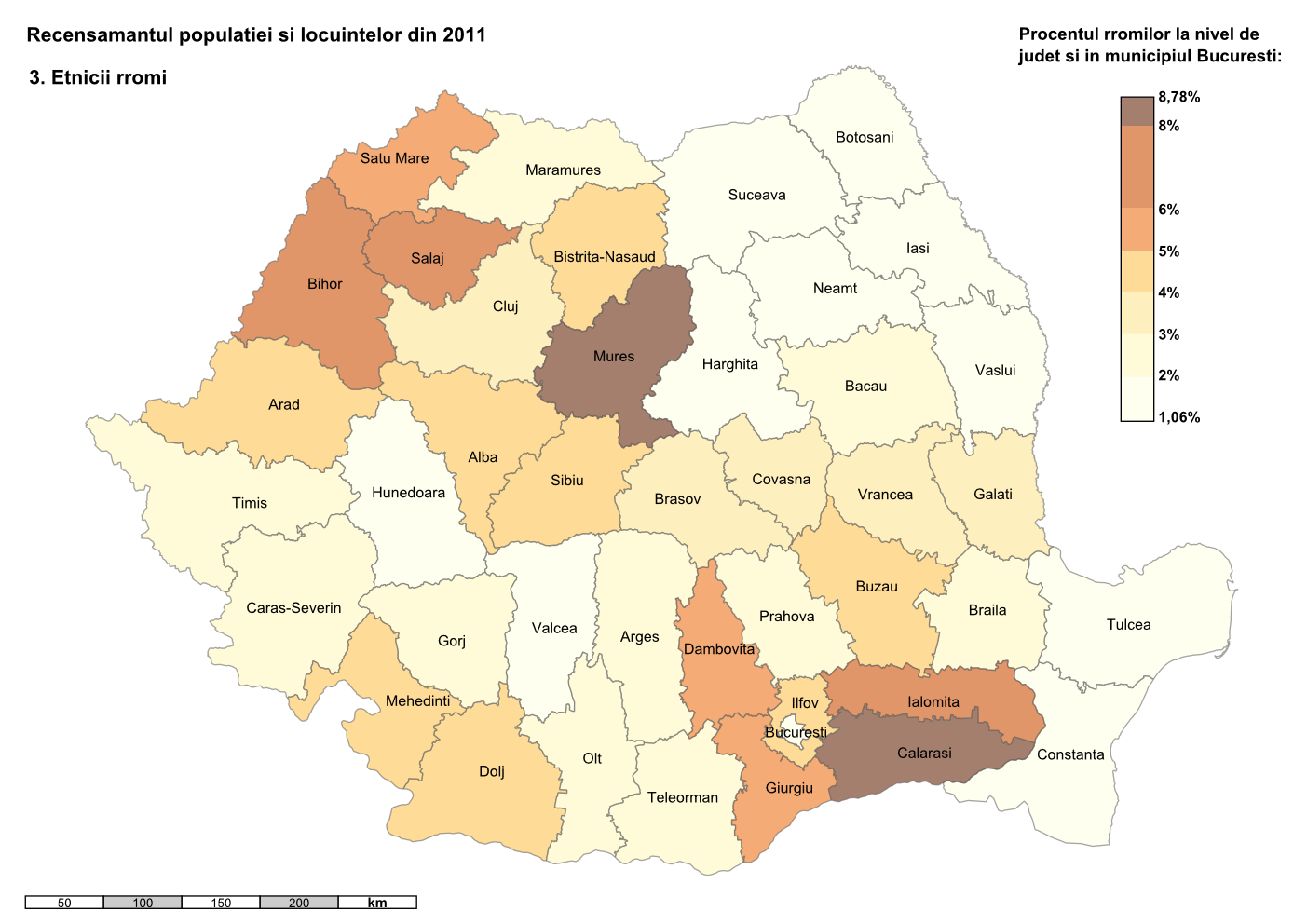
The Romani minority in Romania by county (2011 census)

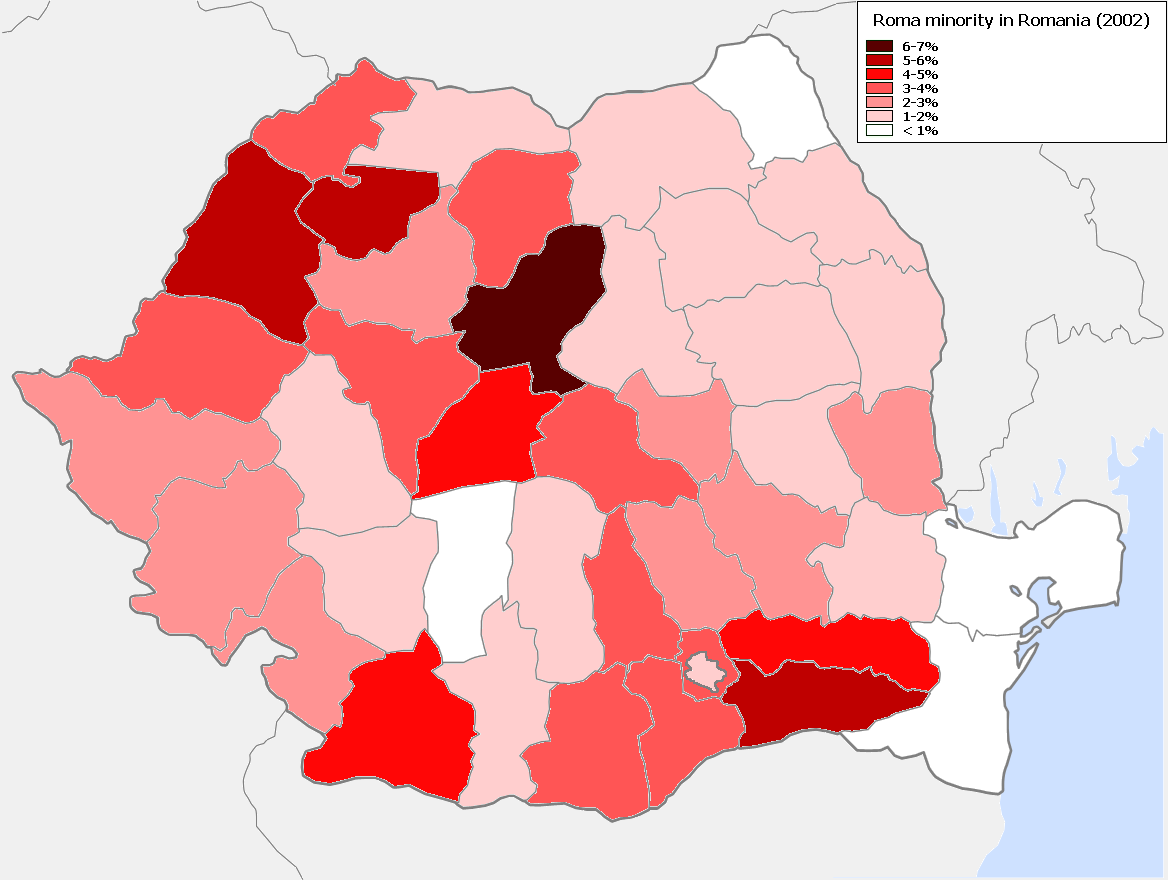
The Romani minority in Romania by county (2002 census)

Percentage of Romani minority who speak Romani language in Romania by county (2011 census)

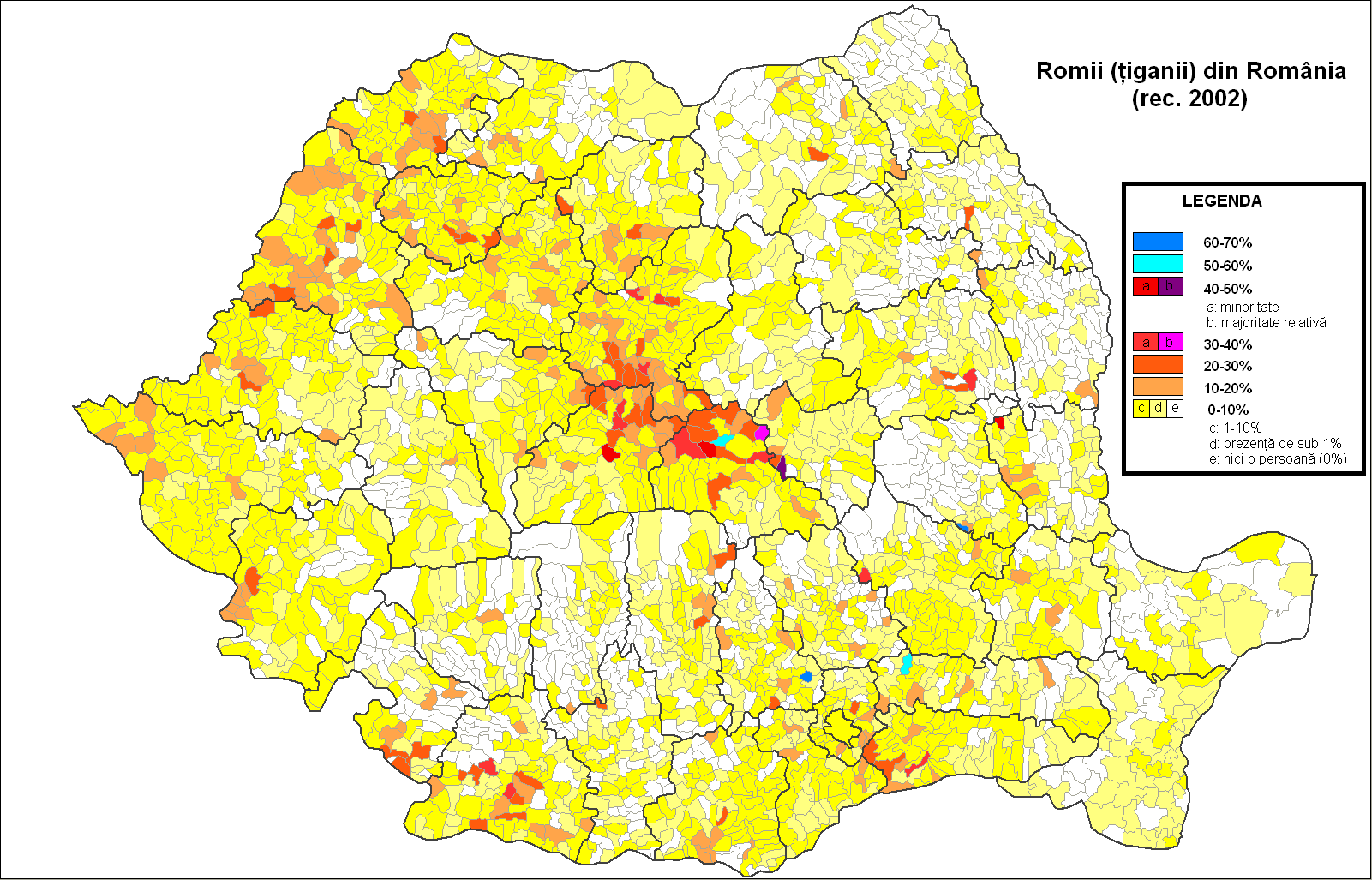
The Romani minority in Romania by municipality (2002 census)

County	Romani population (2011 census)	%
Mureș	46,947	8.52%
Călărași	22,939	7.48%
Sălaj	15,004	6.69%
Bihor	34,640	6.02%
Giurgiu	15,223	5.41%
Dâmbovița	27,355	5.27%
Ialomița	14,278	5.21%
Satu Mare	17,388	5.05%
Dolj	29,839	4.52%
Sibiu	17,946	4.52%
Buzău	20,376	4.51%
Alba	14,292	4.17%
Bistrița-Năsăud	11,937	4.17%
Mehedinți	10,919	4.11%
Arad	16,526	4.04%
Ilfov	15,634	4.02%
Covasna	8,267	3.93%
Vrancea	11,966	3.52%
Brașov	18,519	3.37%
Cluj	22,531	3.26%
Galați	16,990	3.17%
Argeș	16,476	2.69%
Brăila	8,555	2.66%
Maramureș	12,211	2.55%
Bacău	15,284	2.48%
Prahova	17,763	2.33%
Olt	9,504	2.18%
Teleorman	8,198	2.16%
Timiș	14,525	2.12%
Gorj	6,698	1.96%
Suceava	12,178	1.92%
Vâlcea	6,939	1.87%
Hunedoara	7,475	1.79%
Harghita	5,326	1.71%
Caraș-Severin	7,272	1.70%
Tulcea	3,423	1.61%
Vaslui	5,913	1.50%
Iași	11,288	1.46%
Neamț	6,398	1.36%
Bucharest	23,973	1.27%
Constanța	8,554	1.25%
Botoșani	4,155	1.01%
Total	621,573	3.09 %

Romani people have the highest birth rate in Romania and give birth to children younger than ethnic Romanian women.

== Language ==
Less than half of Romani people in Romania are native speakers of the Romani language. According to the 2011 census, there are 245,677 people whose native language is Romani, this represents just under 40% of the ethnic population. However, this number has shrunk to 199,050 according to the 2021 census results, representing just over 33% of the ethnic population. Over half of the Roma (approx. 61%) speak Romanian as their native language, the rest (around 8-9%) speaking the Hungarian language. Both the Roma and the Romanian languages are of the Indo-European language family, while the Hungarian is a Uralic one. The Roma language shares the most lexical similarities with Punjabi and Hindi, the most phonological similarities with Bengali and its grammar structure closely resembles the one found in Merwari. Unsurprisingly, their language is Indo-Aryan, as they originally came from what is today part of east India's Rajasthan, Haryana and Punjab.

The following spreadsheet contains information regarding the native languages of the ethnic Romani population. Note that the information may not be fully representative as there are a reasonable population of Romani who consider themselves to be part of the majority population.

County	Romani population (2011 census)	Romani language	Romanian language	Hungarian language
Alba	14,292	24%	75%	1%
Arad	16,526	43%	54%	3%
Argeș	16,476	9%	91%	0%
Bacău	15,284	59%	40%	1%
Bihor	34,640	53%	12%	35%
Bistrița-Năsăud	11,937	27%	72%	1%
Botoșani	4,155	60%	40%	0%
Brașov	18,519	15%	84%	1%
Brăila	8,555	32%	68%	0%
Bucharest	23,973	15%	85%	0%
Buzău	20,376	44%	56%	0%
Caraș-Severin	7,272	76%	22%	2%
Călărași	22,939	19%	81%	0%
Cluj	22,531	34%	59%	7%
Constanța	8,554	40%	60%	0%
Covasna	8,267	1%	29%	70%
Dâmbovița	27,355	28%	72%	0%
Dolj	29,839	70%	30%	0%
Galați	16,990	59%	41%	0%
Giurgiu	15,223	35%	65%	0%
Gorj	6,698	46%	54%	0%
Harghita	5,326	21%	0%	79%
Hunedoara	7,475	16%	81%	3%
Ialomița	14,278	80%	20%	0%
Iași	11,288	64%	46%	0%
Ilfov	15,634	22%	78%	0%
Maramureș	12,211	53%	41%	6%
Mehedinți	10,919	58%	42%	0%
Mureș	46,947	49%	21%	30%
Neamț	6,398	54%	46%	0%
Olt	9,504	39%	61%	0%
Prahova	17,763	25%	75%	0%
Sălaj	15,004	49%	41%	10%
Satu Mare	17,388	13%	12%	75%
Sibiu	17,946	19%	80%	1%
Suceava	12,178	27%	73%	0%
Teleorman	8,198	56%	44%	0%
Timiș	14,525	59%	40%	1%
Tulcea	3,423	39%	61%	0%
Vâlcea	6,939	30%	70%	0%
Vaslui	5,913	51%	49%	0%
Vrancea	11,966	53%	47%	0%
Total	621,573	3.09 %		

=== Status of language ===
According to the constitution of Romania, under law 57/2019, titl. III, art. 94, alin. 1, those communes in which any national (ethnic) minority of Romania, whose proportion of the commune's population is equal to or exceeds 20%, must provide services and inscriptions in that nation's language. However this is not carried into practice. On the one hand, this law is respected in the cases of most national minorities (e.g.: Hungarian, German etc.). On the other hand, in communes where the ethnic Romani population (e.g.: Vâlcele, Ormeniş) clearly exceeds that threshold, no inscriptions nor services are available in the Romani language. Moreover, in the village of Crăciunești the population of whose native language is Romani form an absolute majority, and, still, none of the inscriptions are in Romani, only in the official language of the state, Romanian, and in another minority language whose population also surpasses 20%, Hungarian. Furthermore, education is unavailable in all, except for one school in Timiș County. In the other schools, medium of instruction is Romanian, in some cases Hungarian. There are also a few schools, where they teach the language in the afternoons. However, it is still not used in other classes.

=== Segregation ===
In Romania there are 2,315 Roma segregated areas, most located on the outskirts of cities, but they can be found in villages as well. These segregated areas typically have a Roma population of almost 100%. The living conditions in these areas are extremely poor: most houses are unmaintained, a number do not even have any services, let alone building permits, with 4.5 people per house on average, a number twice as high as the Romanian one. The vast majority of these segregated areas are predominantly Romanian-speaking, such as the largest segregated area, in Săcele), with over 10,000 people living in it, according to unofficial estimates. Only a minority of these districts are Hungarian or Roma-speaking. The following spreadsheet contains information regarding the largest predominantly Hungarian-speaking Romani segregated areas.

Locality name (RO)	Locality name (HU)	Name of segregated area	Population	Percentage of Hungarian speakers
Târgu-Mureș	Marosvásárhely	Hidegvölgy	2500	85%
Săcueni	Székelyhíd	Dankó Pista	1870	100%
Sfântu-Gheorghe	Sepsiszentgyörgy	Őrkő	1830	100%
Diosig	Diószeg	Sziget	1620	96%
Boroșneu Mare	Nagyborosnyó	Cigányrét	1222	100%
Ardud	Erdőd	erdődi cigánytelep	1135	100%
Acâș	Ákos	ákosi cigánytelep	920	100%
Ghelința	Gelence	Cigányszer	860	100%
Ojdula	Ozsdola	Kishilib	770	100%
Marghita	Margitta	Oncsa-telep	758	97%
Valea Crișului	Sepsikőröspatak	sepsikőröspataki cigánytelep	689	100%
Tășnad	Tasnád	tasnádi cigánytelep	650	77%
Cidreag	Csedreg	Tanya	638	94%

And the partially Hungarian-speaking segregated areas:

Locality name (RO)	Locality name (HU)	Name of segregated area	Population	Percentage of Hungarian speakers
Cluj-Napoca	Kolozsvár	Patarét	3000	16%
Turda	Torda	tordai cigánytelep	1200	7%
Doboșeni	Székelyszáldobos	székelyszáldobosi cigánytelep	1148	26%
Glodeni	Marossárpatak	Szerbia	996	96% (L2 speakers, native:Romani)
Zagon	Zágon	Lingurár-telep	850	26%
Bahnea	Bonyha	Cigánysereg	829	22%
Vânători	Vadász	Gödör	800	18%
Band	Mezőbánd	Kis Telep	780	42%
Hrip	Hirip	hiripi cigánytelep	643	92%
Baia Mare	Nagybánya	Alsófernezely	631	19%
Sighișoara	Segesvár	Parângului	627	27%
Vânători	Héjjasfalva	héjjasfalvi cigánytelep	650	15%

== Religion ==
According to the 2011 census, 69.9% of Roma are Orthodox Christians, 18.4% Pentecostals, 3.8% Roman Catholics, 3% Reformed, 1.1% Greek Catholics, 0.9% Baptists, 0.8% Seventh-Day Adventists, while the rest belong to other religions such as Islam and Lutheranism.

== Cultural influence ==
Notable Romanian Romani musicians and bands include Grigoraş Dinicu, Johnny Răducanu, Ion Voicu, Taraf de Haïdouks, Connect-R and Nicole Cherry. The musical genre manele, a part of Romanian pop culture, is often sung by Romani singers in Romania and has been influenced in part by Romani music, but mostly by Oriental music brought to Romania from Turkey in the 19th century. Romanian public opinion on the subject varies from support to outright condemnation.

Cornmeal is a popular food among Romanian Roma. Ankruste are Kalderash cornmeal cakes made with Indian spices such as coriander and cumin. Other famous foods among Romanian Roma are Şah Hai Mas (cabbage and meat), bândăreș (pork loin seasoned with garlic) and săviacul, a traditional pie made with telemea cheese. Historically, the nomadic Roma favored meat cooked on a spit, over coals, or roasted in a cauldron, typically served with polenta boiled in a pot. The Romani from the pletoşi tribe particularly enjoy whole potatoes roasted directly on coals, served on a plate alongside fried or roasted chicken. The Ursari community traditionally eats fried meat accompanied by polenta and garlic.

Romani people are said to have brought the belief in vampires to Romania. Romanian Roma believe in mullo. Romani people have brought with them tales of the bhuta (restless souls) and the brahmaparusha (a being characterized by a blood-filled skull) from India, rooted in their ancient Hindu beliefs, which have influenced vampire mythology in the Balkans. Romanian Roma are depicted in Bram Stoker's Dracula due to their vampire influence. Another folklore among Romanian Roma is the belief in the werewolf. Witchcraft and fortune-telling are common practices among the Romani community in Romania. The Romanian Roma hold a belief in fairies known as the Ursitory. These Ursitory are three spiritual entities associated with fate and destiny, originating from Romani folklore in the Balkans. They are said to visit a newborn child on the third night following its birth to decide the course of its life.

The Romani population has made significant economic contributions to Romania through various nomadic occupations, including blacksmithing, silversmithing, craftsmanship, cobbling, agricultural work, musical performance, and circus animal training. Certain Romani individuals successfully established independent commercial enterprises, particularly in the footwear industry as shoemakers by opening shops, thereby initiating small-scale business ventures. The Romani people labor in nomadic occupations such as fortune-telling, metalwork and agricultural work in Bucharest. Fortune telling methods of divination include crystal balls, tarot cards, numerology and palmistry. Another Romanian Romani occupation is singing and music. The Romani in Romania are perhaps best known for their music and have always been the preferred choice for events such as weddings and celebrations in Romania. The Roma were also known as horse breeders and horse traders. The Roma were also valued for their skill in treating equine ailments. Another trade of Romanian Roma is that of the comb-maker, which involves crafting various items—such as combs, beads, and earrings—from animal bones and horns; coat racks made from the horns of rams, bulls, or deer; as well as buttons and other decorative objects. The Romanian Romani also possess a talent for creating functional items from materials like sheet metal or wood; they used to craft cauldrons, pots, exceptionally beautiful chandeliers for churches, and even church bells. However, the trades of the comb-maker and the cauldron-maker are gradually disappearing in Romania, as the items they once produced are now manufactured on an industrial scale.

== Discrimination ==
The Roma are the main focus of hate speech on several Romanian websites, along with Hungarians and Jewish people. Prominent Roma individuals in the Romanian government, as well as Romani writers, professors, doctors, athletes, celebrities and singers in Romania, often decline or steer clear of conversations about their Romani heritage due to fears of potential repercussions such as social exclusion, being made scapegoats, or the deterioration or termination of their careers. In Romania, other groups often stereotype Romani people as criminals, thieves, cheaters, liars and beggars. As a result, many Romani individuals conceal their ethnicity, and these negative stereotypes have made it challenging for them to integrate into Romanian society. Romani children in Romania encounter school segregation and receive inferior educational quality compared to other students.

== Crime ==
Romanian Roma people have higher rates of involvement in crimes like ATM skimming, organized pickpocketing, human trafficking, fake begging schemes, credit card fraud, online crimes, prostitution, and robbery.

== Self-proclaimed "Romani royalty" ==
The Romani community has:

- An "Emperor of Roma from Everywhere", as Iulian Rădulescu proclaimed himself. In 1997, Iulian Rădulescu announced the creation of Cem Romengo – the first Rom state in Târgu Jiu, in southwest Romania. According to Rădulescu, "this state has a symbolic value and does not affect the sovereignty and unity of Romania. It does not have armed forces and does not have borders". According to the 2002 population census, in Târgu Jiu there are 96.79% Romanians (93,546 people), 3.01% (Roma) (2,916 people) and 0.20% others.
- A "King of Roma". In 1992, Ioan Cioabă proclaimed himself King of Roma at Horezu, "in front of more than 10,000 Rroms" (according to his son's declaration). His son, Florin Cioabă, succeeded him as king.
- An "International King of Roma". On August 31, 2003, according to a decree issued by Emperor Iulian, Ilie Stănescu was proclaimed king. The ceremony took place in Curtea de Argeş Cathedral, the Orthodox Church where Romania's Hohenzollern monarchs were crowned and are buried. Ilie Stănescu died in December, 2007.

== Image gallery ==
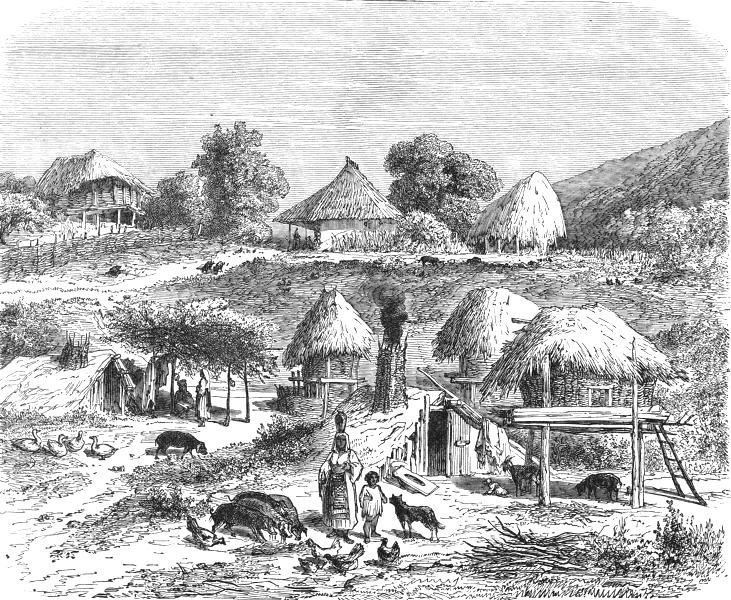
A șatră or village peopled by members of the Romani community of Romania

Purported bulibașa (head of a Romani community)

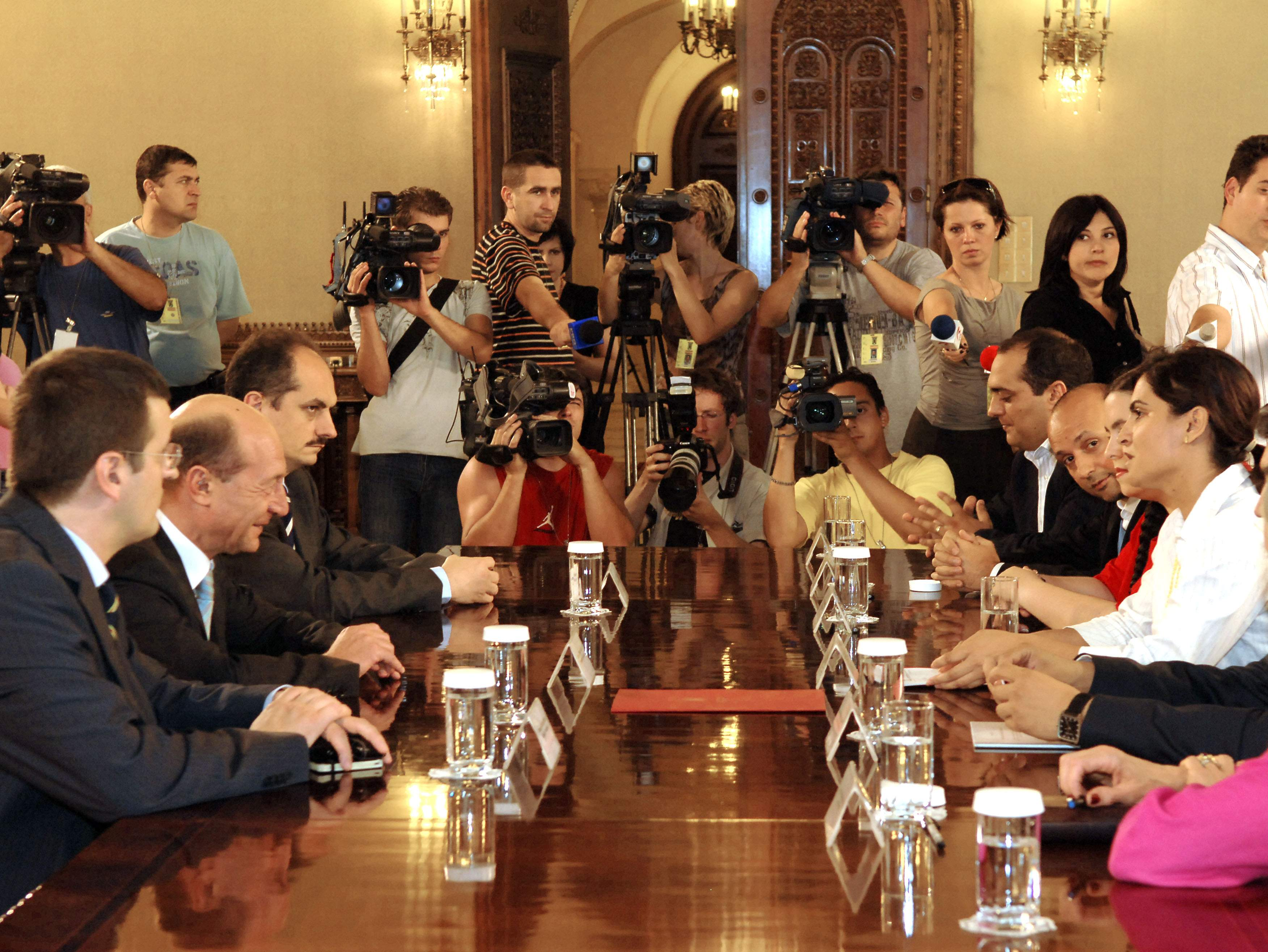
Romanian president Traian Băsescu (left) at a meeting with the representatives of the Romani minority organizations (right)

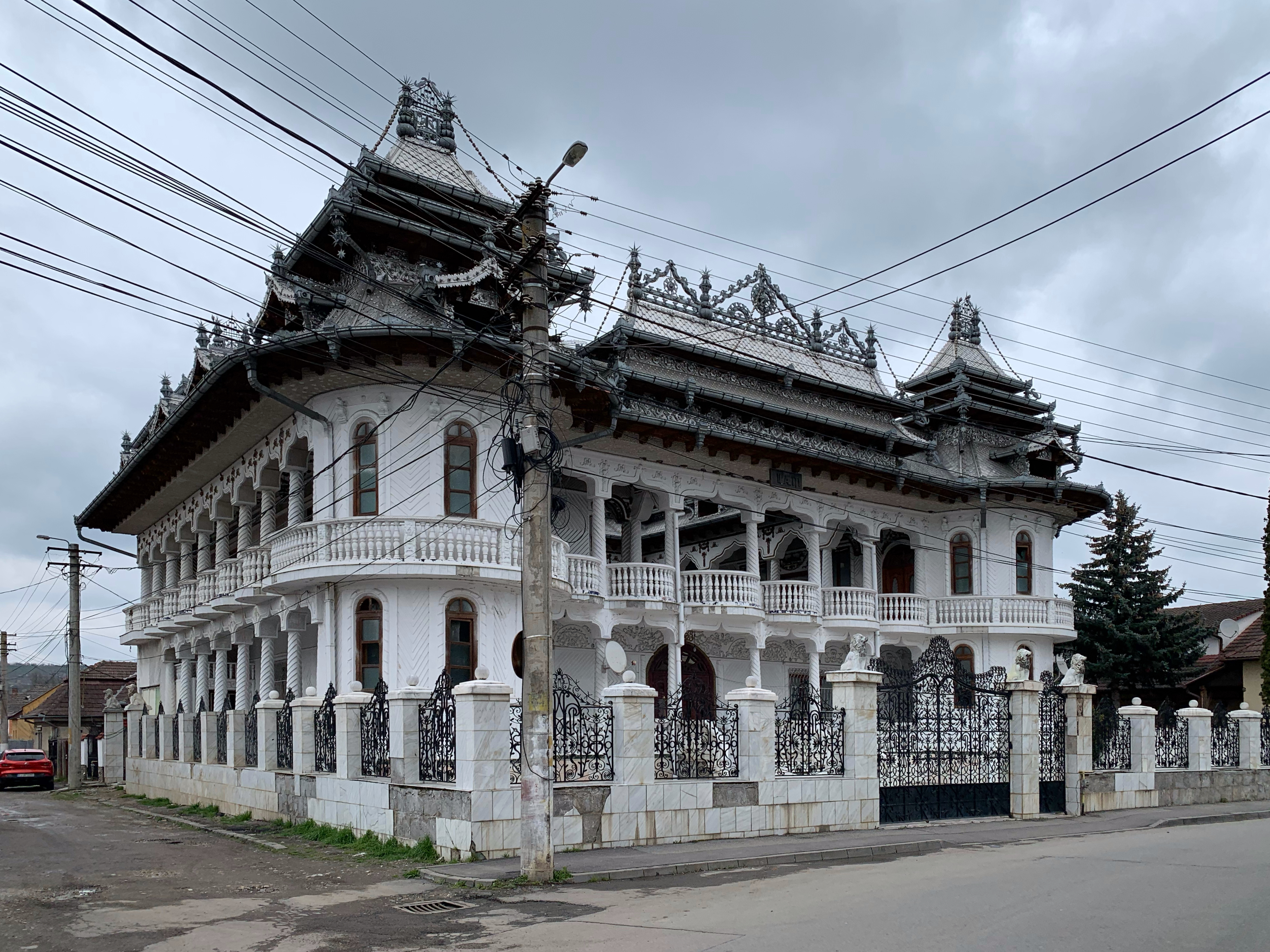
An example wealthy Romani's house, termed Romani Palace, pictured here in Turda, Cluj County

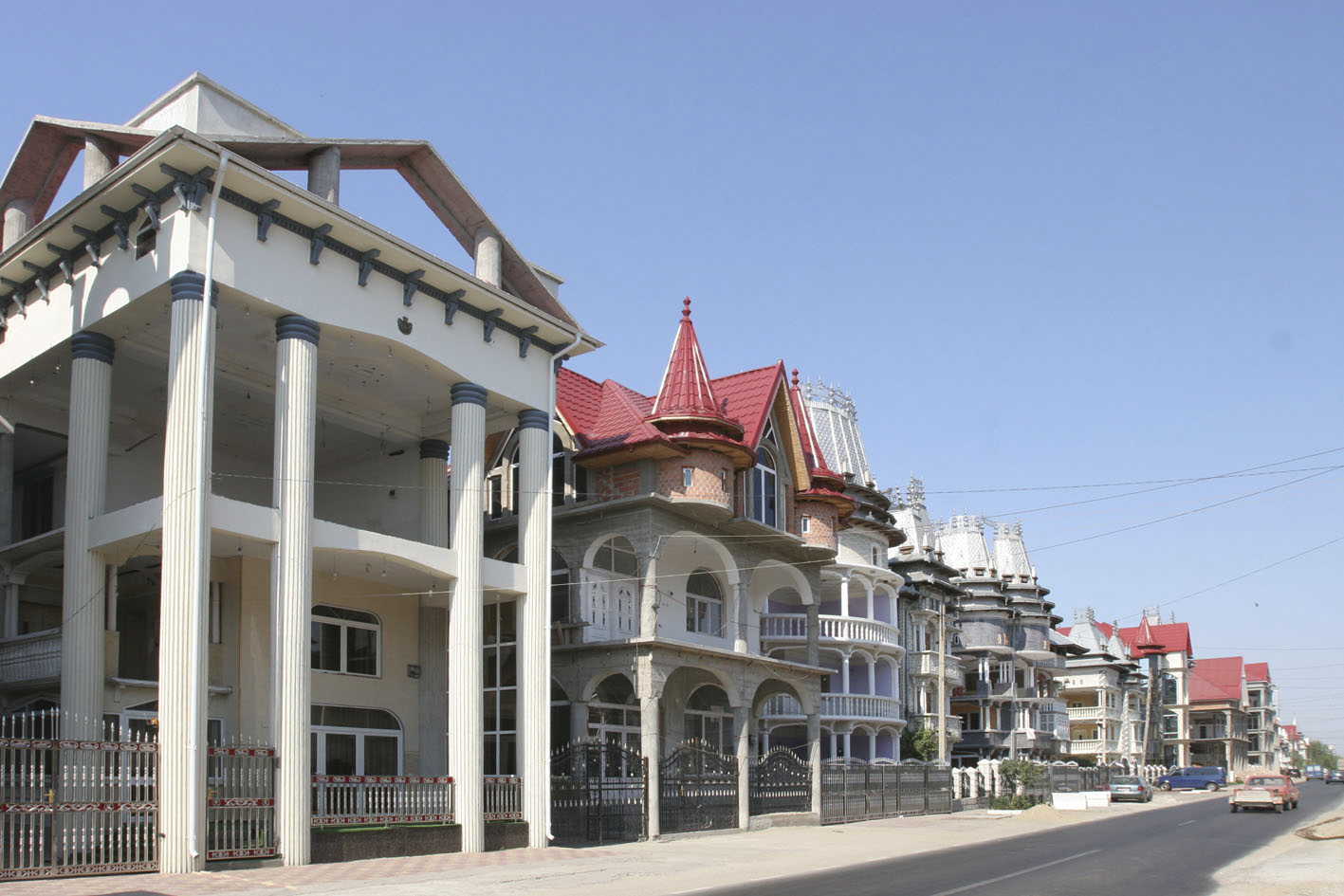
Type of houses owned by wealthy Romani families in Buzescu

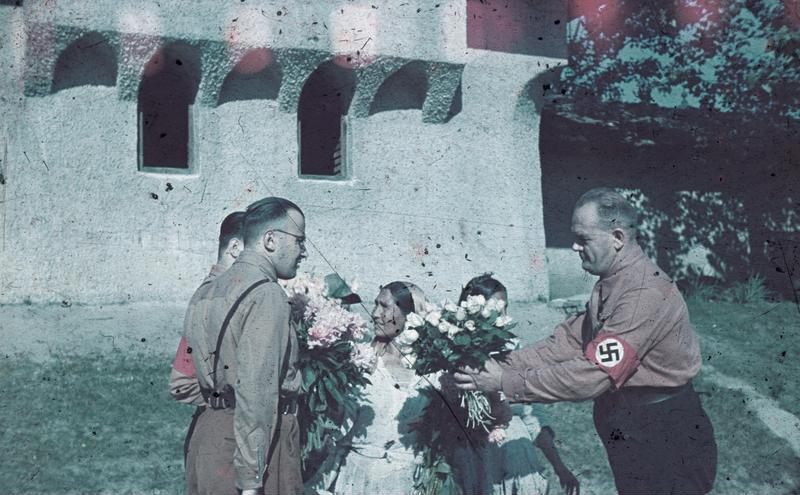
Nazi era image. Posed photo of some NSDAP leaders in 1941, with Romani flower sellers.

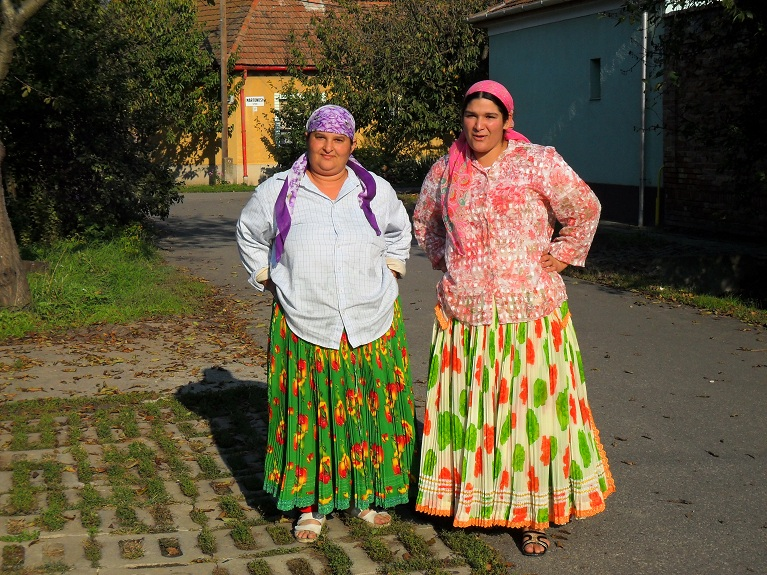
Gábor Hungarian speaking Romani from Transylvania

== Notable people ==
- Florin Cioabă, former king of the Gypsies
- Mădălin Voicu, politician
- Ion Voicu, violinist and conductor, the father of Mădălin Voicu
- Johnny Răducanu, jazz musician
- Damian Drăghici, nai player
- Andra, singer
- Ștefan Bănică, actor, singer
- Ștefan Bănică Jr., actor, singer
- Cornelia Catangă, fiddle-singer
- Nicolae Guţă, manele singer
- Adrian Minune, manele singer
- Florin Salam, manele singer
- Vali Vijelie, manele singer
- Sandu Ciorbă, Gipsy music singer
- Connect-R, singer
- Nicole Cherry, singer
- Karmen, singer
- Bănel Nicoliţă, former footballer
- Marian Simion, Olympic boxer
- Dorel Simion, Olympic boxer
- Florin "Rambo" Lambagiu, kickboxer
- Ioana Rudăreasa, Romanian-Roma abolitionist
- Daniel Dumitrescu, olympic boxer
- Petre Marin, former footballer
- Răzvan Marin, footballer
- Dani Mocanu, manele singer
- Tzancă Uraganu, manele singer
- Alex Velea, manele singer
- Grasu XXL, rapper

== See also ==
- National Agency for the Roma, an agency of the Romanian government dealing with Roma affairs
- Slavery in Romania
- List of towns in Romania by Romani population
- Antiziganism
- 2006 Ferentari riot
- 2025 Northern Ireland riots
