= Carmen Șerban =

Romanian singer

Carmen Şerban
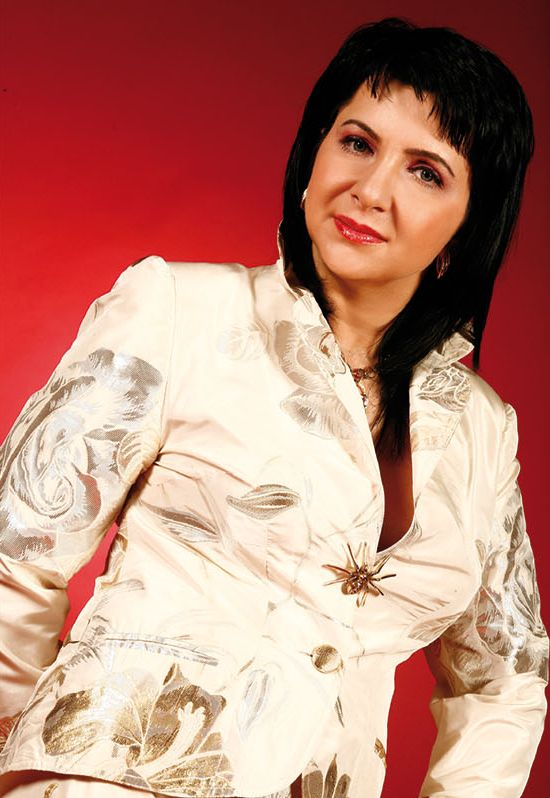

Background information
- Born: Carmen Georgeta Șerban; 2 March 1971 (age 54); Timișoara, Romania
- Genres: Manele, folk
- Occupation: singer
- Years active: 1995–present
- Labels: Roton, Zoom Studio, Gong
- Website: carmenserban.ro

Carmen Georgeta Șerban is a Romanian folk singer with over 26 albums released.

She has collaborated with many of the most popular singers, including Irina Loghin, Nicolae Guţă and Adrian Copilul Miniune. Her songs are about the traditional themes of manele; love, lust, and money. Over her 21-year career, she has gained such great popularity that she has toured not only Romania, but also the United States, Germany, Italy and Canada. Each of her album was sold in more than 100,000 exemplars, being one of the most well-known Romanian pop singers.

== Partial discography ==
Albums:

1. M-ai gasit si ai noroc
2. Cantece de iarna (Colinde si cantece de petrecere)
3. Sange de roman sa ai
4. Vad numai oameni necajiti
5. Femeia e un inger
6. Fericirea azi o cant
7. Carmen, Guta si Adrian
8. Carmen stie
9. Nu uita de cei saraci
10. Jur ca n-am sa mai iubesc
11. Cupidon Bum Bum
12. Vreau tanar sa raman
13. Nu ma uita
14. Fara egal

== See also ==
- Music of Romania
