= Tzancă Uraganu =

Romanian singer and songwriter (born 1990)

Tzanca Uraganu
- Also known as: Tzanca Uraganul, Tzanca de la Ploiești
- Born: Andrei Velcu; 30 November 1990 (age 35); Ploiești, Romania
- Origin: Romania
- Genres: Dance-pop • manele • hip hop • trap • pop • rock
- Occupation: singer
- Instrument: voice
- Years active: 2012–present
- Website: youtube.com/c/TzancaUraganuNekMusic

Andrei Velcu (born 30 November 1990), known by the stage name Tzanca Uraganul or Țancă de la Ploiești, is a Romanian manele singer of Romani origin.

== Early life ==
Andrei Velcu was born on 30 November 1990 in Ploiești, Romania, where he lived and studied as a child. He attended high school until the 10th grade, later wanting to pursue a career in football. Influenced by his brother, Velcu gave up his ambition to become a footballer and chose a career in music. After several years in the band of Florin Salam, Velcu achieves an initial success as a solo artist with the song "Dale Dale" in 2012. The nickname "Țancă" was given to him by his mother.

== Career ==
Andrei Velcu made his debut in music under the stage name "Tzanca de la Ploiești". He changed his stage name to "Tzancă Uraganul" after Nicolae Guță called him "the hurricane of music" (in Romanian "uraganul muzicii") in the video for the song "Through water and fire I passed" ("Prin apă și foc am trecut") in 2014. However, Tzancă's success came later, after associating with the producer Nek Music, his songs garnering millions of views on YouTube and other music streaming platforms. Tzancă's musical style was influenced by fiddle, manele of the 1990s and 2000s, but also by trap music. Tzancă reached the first place in the Billboard chart for Romanian music in March 2022 with the song "Take me off the block."

== Personal life ==
Velcu's brother is also a singer, performing under the name "Miraj Tzunami". He has two children: Anaisa, born 2018, and Andreas, born 2022. Anaisa Velcu was baptized by Florin Salam and his partner.

Tzanca confirmed that he had problems with drug use, but that he gave up substance use after 2019. During the COVID-19 pandemic in Romania he experienced episodes of anxiety, which he overcame with the help of psychotherapy services. Velcu also mentioned that the pandemic period meant more time spent with his daughter, Anaisa.

=== Albums ===
- Noaptea Golanii (2021, Big Man)
- Prieten Periculos (2020, Big Man)

=== Singles ===
- "Tanar și producător" – 15 March 2022
- "Cand intru eu in Ucraina" – 13 March 2022
- "Tancuri blindate" feat. Miraj Tzunami – 12 March 2022
- "Beau numai băuturi fine" feat. Yanis – 6 March 2022
- "Tu san miri cali" feat. Toni de la Brasov – 1 March 2022
- "Regina mea" – 26 February 2022
- "Averea mea nu se măsoară în bogății" – 25 February 2022
- "La mulți ani băiatul meu" – 17 February 2022
- "Doamne câtă supărare – Doină" – 15 February 2022
- "Frate lângă frate" feat. Miraj Tzunami – 7 February 2022
- "Cine se naște campion" – 5 February 2022
- "Zile rele, zile bune" – 4 February 2022
- "Am bani și putere" – 3 February 2022
- "De astăzi pun la toate stop" feat. George Talent – 29 January 2022
- "Sefa" feat. Loredana Pavel – 22 January 2022
- "Banii cash nu în rate" – 30 December 2021
- "Smecherii nu au arfe" feat. Eduard de la Roma – 22 December 2021
- "De când s-a scumpit benzina" – 12 December 2021
- "Fac deranj" – 10 December 2021
- "Mărește zoom-ul" – 27 November 2021
- "Ceas cu diamant" – 6 November 2021
- "Spargi semințe" feat. Florin Salam – 30 October 2021
- "Baga Tik Tok" feat. Mr Juve – 22 October 2021
- "Daca ai femeie frumoasă" feat. Florin Salam x Mr Juve – 9 October 2021
- "Cel mai norocos" – 2 October 2021
- "Să vină dimineața" feat. Andrei Despa – 25 September 2021
- "Zana mea, frumoasa mea" – 26 August 2021
- "Nu ma sperie nimic" – 17 August 2021
- "Mi-am urcat tronul pe munte" – 15 August 2021
- "Esti genul meu" feat. Roxana Dobritoiu – 29 July 2021
- "De-as avea smecherometru" – 16 July 2021
- "Te iubesc de mor" – 2 July 2021
- "Legendele" feat. Miraj Tzunami – 19 June 2021
- "Flacara de lumanare" – 18 June 2021
- "Buzele cu rosu inchis" – 18 June 2021
- "Se misca brrr brrr" – 7 June 2021
- "Șurubu" – 21 May 2021
- "FAMILIA" – 2 May 2021
- "Ea e Regina din Maroc" – 30 April 2021
- "Bagabond asa ma vrea " – 15 April 2021
- "Ca miliardarii " – 10 April 2021
- "Viata exclusivista" – 6 April 2021
- "Buna seara as vrea" – 11 March 2021
- "E buna rau pe basi " – 25 February 2021
- "Numele meu" – 24 January 2021
- "Mânca-ți-aș Hazul" – 16 October 2020
- "Ne-ar sta bine" – 21 June 2020
- "Se mișcă pe beat" – 20 November 2019
- "Dale Dale" – 27 June 2012
