= Sandu Ciorba =

Romanian Roma singer

Alexandru Ciorbă (born December 30, 1968), better by his stage name Sandu Ciorba, is a Romanian singer-songwriter known for his work in the Romanian Romani music genre. His singles "Dalibomba" and "Pe Cimpoi" have become viral in Poland, and critics praised his musical and video style as "unique and weird". Born in Cluj-Napoca, Ciorbă is of Romani heritage.

== Career ==
His hit single "Dalibomba" shot him to stardom in Poland, where viewers and critics described the track as "It is a piece of shit, but I am watching it for the fifth time". As of 2025, the accompanying music video for "Dalibomba" has received over 49 million views. The title of the hit is translated in Polish as "Wielka dzika bomba" ("Huge Wild Bomb").

In 2015, Romanian press widely commented on the fact that Huffington Post UK tongue-in-cheek nominated Ciorba's hit "Pe cimpoi" ("On Cimpoi" or "By Cimpoi"; over 55 million views) " the weirdest video on the internet". The tune of "Pe cimpoi" draws upon Transylvanian folklore tunes. These parody style songs is only part of Ciorba's work. In particular, he cooperates with manele singer Nicolae Guță. Still another popular music video is "Papu" (over 55M views).

Ciorba's songs have appeared in several films. Sandu Ciorba cooperates with Viper Production music studio devoted to Romani music.

== Discography ==
- 2007: Fără adversari Vol.2 (with Nicolae Guță), Viper Productions, iTunes
- 2008: Fără adversari Vol.3 (with Nicolae Guță), Viper Productions, iTunes
- 2009: Fără adversari Vol.4 (with Nicolae Guță), Viper Productions, iTunes
- 2015: King of Gipsy Music, Viper Productions, iTunes
- 2017: Fără adversari Vol.5 (with Nicolae Guță), Viper Productions, iTunes

Some songs of Sandu Ciorba were included in various collections of Roma music by Viper Productions.

== Filmography ==
Sandu Ciorba's songs have appeared in several films.

- 2023 Romanian-Croatian-French-Luxembourger film Do Not Expect Too Much from the End of the World.
- 2013 American-Romanian film Charlie Countryman.
- 2009 French film Korkoro about the times during the Porajmos ("Gypsy Holocaust").
- 2006 French film Transylvania.
