= Florin Salam =

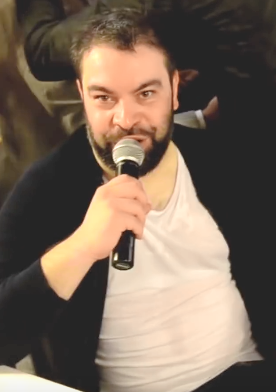

Background information
- Also known as: Florin Salam, Regele manelelor (King of Manele), Al vostru F.S. (Your F.S.), Regele distracției (King of Partying)
- Born: Florin Stoian; 1 October 1979 (age 47); Bucharest, Romania
- Origin: Romania
- Genre: Manele • pop • dance-pop • rock • hard rock • rap rock • rap metal • hip hop
- Occupations: Singer, rapper
- Instruments: Vocals, accordion, electric guitar, bass
- Years active: 1996–present
- Labels: Nek Music, Big Man, Amma Record, Atlantic

Florin Stoian (born 1 October 1979), better known by his stage name Florin Salam, is a Romanian manele musician.

== Biography ==
=== Early life ===
Salam was born on October 1, 1979 into a family of Romani lăutari. During his adolescence, he sang together with his father and uncle's ensembles.

After his father got too old to sing, Salam took his place, singing with his uncle under the name of Florin Fermecătoru'. In the meantime, Salam befriended bandleader Dan Bursuc. He helped Salam to record his first single, called "Ce gagică șmecherită" (transl. Such a picky chick), in 2002. He played an important part when the smash hit "Of, viața mea" (transl. Oh, my life) was released in 2000, sung by Adrian Minune and Costi Ioniță. At the end of 2002, Salam changed his stage name from "Fermecătorul" (transl. charming) to the Arabic "Salam" (English: peace). He continued to record songs and market them with the help of Dan Bursuc. In this way he released his first album of manele; the album sold more than 40,000 copies. Likewise, Costi Ioniță recorded one of his albums which enjoyed a high success, the album entitled "Doar cu tine" (English: Only with you). The album was recorded in Constanța where Costi Ioniță has his own recording studio.

His friendship with Dan Bursuc brought meetings with other artists of this genre, artists like Vali Vijelie, Nicolae Guță and Daniela Gyorfi.

In 2008 he performed a song together with pop singer Paula Seling and the Bucharest Symphonic Orchestra. The show host described their performance as a reconciliation between manele and mainstream pop music; in the same respect, the song's lyrics raised the problem of ethnic intolerance.

In October 2011, Salam collaborated with the Bosnian musician Goran Bregović, along with whom he recorded "Hopa Cupa" and "Omule", songs which were included in the album Champagne for Gypsies. The album is "in reaction to the extreme pressure that Gypsies (Roma) have been experiencing lately across Europe".

Salam is the vice-president of Asociația Artiștilor, Muzicanților și Lăutarilor Romi din România (English: The Association of Romani Artists, Musicians and Lăutari from Romania). In December 2005, he was announced as the best manele performer of the year. According to the daily paper Libertatea, politician Mădălin Voicu and footballer Marius Niculae count among his fans.

=== 2012–present: Saint Tropez and subsequent success ===
External videos
- Florin Salam - Saint Tropez on YouTube
- Șușanu feat. Salam - Ești bombă on YouTube
- Florin Salam și Claudia - Mergem mai departe on YouTube

In February 2013, Salam recorded "Saint Tropez". The official video gaubed more than 70 million views on YouTube, inasmuch as he was accused that he copied the song from Bulgarian singer Azis. His video became popular and was ranked in most-viewed videos on Romanian YouTube in 2013, after Andra's song, "Inevitabil va fi bine". Since then, Salam had several concerts in the country and abroad where large communities of Gypsies live.

Among the most popular collaborations have included those with Claudia Păun and Nicolae Șușanu. His smash hit "Ești bombă" (English: You're a bomb), released in July 2013 in collaboration with Șușanu, was viewed by more than 27 million people on YouTube. The songs launched with Claudia ("Ce bine ne stă împreună" – How well we stand together, "Ce frumoasă e dragostea" – How beautiful is love, and "Mergem mai departe" – We go further) feature themes like unfeasible love or desire to be near a loved one, as themes with great appeal to the public.

Today, as Florin Salam, he collaborates with record labels Nek Music and Big Man.

== Discography ==
=== Songs ===
Song	English translation	Date released	Label
"Sunt cel mai norocos din lume"	I'm the luckiest in the world	22 March 2012	Amma Record
"Jumătate pentru mine" (feat. Georgiana)	Half for me	12 April 2012	Nek Music
"Mai frumoasă ca o floare" (feat. Biju)	More beautiful than a flower	28 May 2012	Big Man
"Fac ce vrea inima ta" (feat. Liviu Guță)	I do what your heart wants	1 June 2012	Big Man
"Lume rea" (feat. Roxana Prințesa Ardealului)	Bad world	2 June 2012	Big Man
"Nici o sută, nici o mie" (feat. Mitzu din Sălaj)	Not a hundred or a thousand	11 July 2012	Big Man
"Ce frumoasă e dragostea" (feat. Claudia)	How beautiful is love	17 August 2012	Nek Music
"Brazilianca"	Brazilian woman	13 December 2012	Nek Music
"Tu ai să plângi" (feat. Cristi Dorel)	You'll cry	18 December 2012	Zoom Studio
"Îți cumpăr lalele" (feat. Nek & Asu)	I'll buy you tulips	21 December 2012	Nek Music
"Nimeni" (feat. Răzvan de la Pitești)	Nobody	22 December 2012	Big Man
"Saint Tropez"		1 February 2013	Nek Music
"Ia-mă, ia-mă"	Take me, take me	11 February 2013	Kompact Sound
"De-ar trece viața mai ușor"	If life would pass easier	17 February 2013	Nek Music
"Frumusețe de femeie" (feat. Ninel de la Brăila)	Beauty woman	26 February 2013	Amma Record
"Doar dragostea" (feat. Găbiță de la Craiova)	Only love	16 March 2013	Nek Music
"Cine te-a trimis pe tine"	Who sent you	5 April 2013	Nek Music
"Viața e plină de culori" (feat. Mihaela Staicu)	Life is full of colors	10 April 2013	Nek Music
"Bruneta" (feat. Katy de la Buzău)	The brunette	19 May 2013	Amma Record
"Să nu te cerți cu frații" (feat. Mitzu din Sălaj)	Don't brawl with brothers	4 July 2013	Nek Music
"Ești bombă" (feat. Șușanu)	You're a bomb	9 July 2013	Big Man
"De tine m-am îndrăgostit"	I'm in love with you	29 July 2013	Nek Music
"La vârsta mea îmi permit orice" (feat. Leo de Vis)	At my age I can afford anything	28 August 2013	Nek Music
"Dacă tu nu ești"	If you're not	31 August 2013	Amma Record
"Nebunia anului" (feat. Raluca Drăgoi)	The madness of the year	17 October 2013	Big Man
"Ce ai cu viața mea"	What you have with my life	21 October 2013	Nek Music
"Orice om are o poveste"	Everyone has a story	11 November 2013	Nek Music
"Besame mi amor"	Kiss me my love	21 November 2013	Amma Record
"Mia mia mi amor"	My my my love	29 November 2013	Nek Music
"Cât aș vrea să mai fiu cum eram"	How I like to be as I was	10 December 2013	Amma Record
"O noapte cu mine" (feat. Leo de Vis)	A night with me	19 February 2014	Nek Music
"Alege-mă în viața ta"	Choose me in your life	20 February 2014	Nek Music
"Hai iubito"	Come on baby	11 March 2014	Nek Music
"Cum să nu o iubesc" (feat. Bogdan de la Oradea)	How can I not love her	11 April 2014	Nek Music
"De-aș mai avea o mică șansă"	If I'd have a small chance	18 April 2014	Nek Music
"Îmi stă bine în brațe la tine" (feat. Katy de la Buzău)	I look good in your arms	18 April 2014	Nek Music
"O mie de nopți" (feat. Nicoleta Ceaunică)	A thousand nights	19 April 2014	Nek Music
"Fiți pe fază" (feat. Nek)	Stay tuned	22 May 2014	Nek Music
"Vino lângă mine" (feat. Mr. Juve)	Come next to me	20 August 2014	Nek Music
"Mișcă-te ca o felină" (feat. Costi de la Timișoara)	Move like a feline	10 October 2014	Nek Music
"N-aș putea să iubesc banii"	I couldn't love the money	13 October 2014	Nek Music
"Hei mami" (feat. Șușanu)	Hey mommy	28 October 2014	Big Man
"99 de probleme"	99 problems	31 October 2014	Zoom Studio
"Saka laka"		1 November 2014	Nek Music
"Mergem mai departe" (feat. Claudia)	We go further	12 November 2014	Nek Music
"Cu tine mi-e bine" (feat. DeSanto)	With you I'm fine	14 November 2014	Zoom Studio
"Viața mea e și bună și rea"	My life is good and bad	25 November 2014	Big Man
"Gura lumii e rea"	The word of mouth is bad	28 November 2014	Zoom Studio
"Bailando"	Dancing	4 December 2014	Nek Music
"Indianca mea" (feat. Ninel de la Brăila & Mr. Juve)	My Indian woman	6 December 2014	Amma Record
"Un nebun așa ca mine"	A fool like me	10 December 2014	Nek Music
"Sanki, sanki"		21 December 2014	Zoom Studio
"Nu vreau nimic" (feat. Nicoleta Ceaunică)	I want nothing	23 December 2014	Nek Music
"Cine altcineva ca mine"	Who else like me	25 December 2014	Zoom Studio
"Din câte stele sunt pe cer"	From how many stars are in the sky	29 December 2014	Big Man
"A ieșit soarele din nori"	The sun came out from the clouds	30 December 2014	Nek Music
"7 zile"	7 days	17 January 2015	Nek Music
"Am să scriu într-o carte"	I'll write in a book	30 January 2015	Nek Music
"Cuba, Cuba"		10 February 2015	Nek Music
"Poza ta nu mă sărută"	Your photo doesn't kiss me	21 February 2015	Big Man

== Personal life ==
Salam was married to Ștefania in September 2007, in Antalya, Turkey; the best man was manele singer and close collaborator Adrian Minune. The wedding cost was not less than 500,000 euros. On 12 April 2009, Ștefania (aged 27) died from kidney failure, aggravated by a kidney infection. Moreover, she had long suffered from hepatic cirrhosis.

After his wife's death, Salam had no partner, until 2013, when he met Oana, a young woman from Ploiești. Their relationship did not last more than a few months. As of 2014, he was in a relationship with Roxana Dobre, who had previously posed for Playboy magazine. They intended to marry, and Roxana was pregnant with a girl.

=== Relations with moneylenders ===
Early in his career, Salam was financially supported by brothers Sile and Nuțu Cămătaru, renowned moneylenders. After his wife's death, he succumbed to gambling, with accumulating debts, as a situation that pushed him to borrow money from moneylenders. In August 2013, Stoian was aggressed by three debt collectors in front of the Rin Grand Hotel in Bucharest, who were trying to recover by force money given to Florin with usury. Moreover, Salam was investigated by DIICOT for drug use.
