= Ștefan de la Bărbulești =

Ștefan de la Bărbulești (Ștefan from Bărbulești) born on 25 December 1959 is a Romani lăutar and manele singer, best known internationally as the artist of the song "Eu Vin Acasă Cu Drag". This song, however, is more recognized as the "Borat Television Programme" theme as shown on Channel 4, as part of the Ali G series starring Sacha Baron Cohen. He is also well-known for "Manele la rece", where people pay him thousands to sing according to their life's events. He is well known in Țăndărei for his singing tributes.

The song is included on the official soundtrack to Cohen's 2006 film.

His son, Narcis, is also a manele singer.
