= Bradu =

- Commune
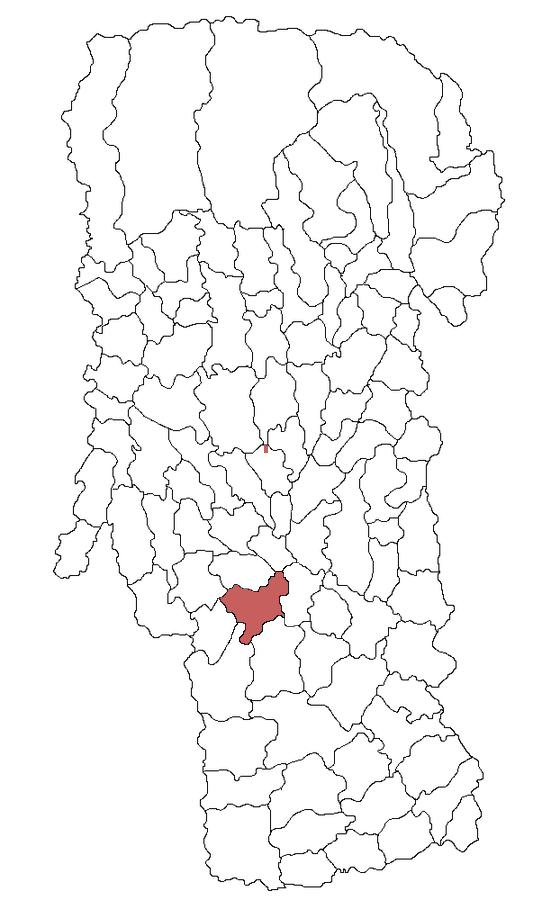
- Location in Argeș County

- Location in Romania
- Coordinates: 44°47′N 24°54′E
- Country: Romania
- County: Argeș

Government
  - Mayor (2020–2024): Dănuț-Trandafir Stroe (PSD)
- Area: 40.31 km^{2} (15.56 sq mi)
- Elevation: 267 m (876 ft)
- Population (2021-12-01): 10,032
  - Density: 248.9/km^{2} (644.6/sq mi)
- Time zone: UTC+02:00 (EET)
  - Summer (DST): UTC+03:00 (EEST)
- Postal code: 117140
- Area code: +(40) 248
- Vehicle reg.: AG
- Website: www.primariabradu.ro

Bradu is a commune in Argeș County, Muntenia, Romania. It is composed of two villages, Bradu and Geamăna.

The commune lies at the northern edge of the Wallachian Plain, on the right bank of the Argeș River. It is located in the central part of the county, just south of the county seat, Pitești. Bradu is crossed by national road DN65A, which makes the connection between the A1 highway and DN65.

Historical population
Year	Pop.	±%
2002	5,140	—
2011	7,130	+38.7%
2021	10,032	+40.7%
Source: Census data

== Natives ==
- Dani Mocanu (born 1992), manele singer
