= Stana Izbașa =

Romanian singer

Stana Izbaşa is a Romanian folkloric music singer from Romania. She began her career by singing Romanian folkloric songs, especially from Banat, but later, after the manele genre flooded the Romanian music market, she began to sing manele. Some of her most famous songs have been duets with other singers such as Adi de Vito and Nicu Paleru. She collaborated with Adi de Vito on the remake of Lepa Brena's (one of ex-Yugoslavia's biggest stars) song "Čik, pogodi".
