= Vasile Martinoiu =

Romanian operatic baritone (born 1934)

Vasile Martinoiu (born 2 April 1934) is a Romanian operatic baritone. A long-time member of the Romanian National Opera, in 2004 he was made a Commander of the Ordinul "Meritul Cultural" (Order of Cultural Merit) for services to Romanian music.

== Biography ==
Born in a family of musicians in Tirgu Jiu, Martinoiu discovered his vocal gift in his high school years, when he sang with various school choirs. After high school, he became a student at the Cornetti Conservatoire in Craiova. Three years later he moved to the Music Academy in Iași, from which he graduated in 1958.

In 1959, Martinoiu made a successful debut at the Musical Theatre in Galați as Count di Luna in Il trovatore. The Romanian Opera in Bucharest offered him the opportunity to become a permanent soloist with their organisation.

His completed special studies with baritone Carlo Tagliabue in Milan and at the Accademia Nazionale di Santa Cecilia in Rome between 1967–1968.

He has performed in numerous engagements in Europe and overseas, singing at the New York City Opera, Philadelphia Grand Opera, Baltimore Opera, and the Kennedy Center in Washington. He has toured in Austria, Belgium, Bulgaria, China, France, Germany, Greece, Hungary, Italy, Poland, Russia, Sweden, Switzerland, Czech Republic, Slovakia, Thailand, Turkey, and the United States.

He has appeared in radio and TV broadcasts in Berlin, Bucharest, Budapest, Dresden, Goerlitz, Leipzig, Pécs, Sofia, Moscow, and Warsaw.

== Prizes ==
He has participated in several international festivals of music and in 12 international canto competitions.

- 1965: grand prize at the Erkel Competition in Budapest, Hungary
- 1966: second prize at the Maria Calas Competition in Barcelona, Spain
- 1966: laureate title at the P.I. Tchaikovsky Competition in Moscow, Russia
- 1966: second prize at the s’Hertogenbosch International Competition in the Netherlands
- 1967: first prize for Bulgarian composed lieder, and third prize for canto at the International Competition in Sofia, Bulgaria
- 1967: second prize at the International Canto Competition in Toulouse, France
- 1967: second prize at the Francesco Viñas Competition in Barcelona, Spain
- 1968: second prize at the Voci Verdiane Competition in Busseto, Italy
- 1968: third prize at the Giuseppe Verdi Competition in Parma, Italy
- 1968: second prize at the International Competition in Verviers, Belgium
- 1969: first prize at the Achille Peri Competition at Reggio Emilia, Italy

== Opera repertoire ==
- Bizet: Carmen – Escamillo
- Donizetti: La Favorite – Alfonse; Lucia di Lammermoor – Lord Ashton
- Umberto Giordano: Andrea Chénier – Carlo Gerard
- Gounod: Faust – Valentin
- Leoncavallo: I Pagliacci – Tonio, Silvio
- Mascagni: La Cavalleria Rusticana – Alfio
- Puccini: Madama Butterfly – Scharpless; La Bohème – Marcello, Tosca – Baron Scarpia
- Ravel: L’Heure espagnole – Ramiro
- Rossini: Il Barbiere di Siviglia – Figaro
- Verdi: Aida- Amonasro; Un Ballo in maschera – Renato; Don Carlo – Rodrigo; La Forza del destino – Don Carlo, Nabucco – Nabucco; Otello – Iago; Rigoletto – Rigoletto; Stiffelio – Stankar; La traviata – Germont; Il trovatore – Conte di Luna

Romanian opera parts

- Enesco: Oedipus – Creon
- Lerescu, E.: Ecaterina Teodoroiu – Dobre
- Petri, N.: Trandafirii Doftanei – Bogdan
- Trailescu, C.: Dragoste si jertfa – Lazar

Vocal-symphonic works and lieder

Beethoven, Borodin, Brahms, Donaudi, Enesco, Fauré, Gluck, Grieg, Haendel, Haydn, Leoncavallo, Massenet, Mendelssohn-B, Mahler, Mozart, Rachmaninov, Respighi, Saint-Saëns, Schubert, Schumann, Tchaikovsky, Thomas, Wolf

Romanian composers

Brediceanu, Constantinescu, Drăgoi, Eliade, Gheciu, Monţia

== Bibliography ==
- Rich, Maria F. Who's who in opera: an international biographical directory of singers, Arno Press, 1976, p. 345. ISBN 0-405-06652-X
- Presedintele Romaniei, Decretul 34 din 7 februarie 2004, Monitorul Oficial al Romaniei, No. 172, 27 February 2004
