= Manele =

Music genre

- Stylistic origins: Lăutărească music; Aromanian music; Greek music; Turkish music; Arabesque music; Bulgarian music; Serbian music; Balkan brass music
- Cultural origins: Late 18th century, Ottoman Romania

Manele (from Romanian, fem. sg. manea; pl. manele, the plural form being more common) is a genre of pop folk music from Romania.

The manele can be divided into "classical manele" and "modern manele". The "classical manele" are a Turkish-derived genre performed by Romani musicians called lăutari in a lăutărească manner, while the "modern manele" are a mixture of Turkish, Greek, Arabic, Bulgarian and Serbian elements, generally using modern (electronic) instruments and beats.

Similar music styles are also present in other Balkan areas, such as Bulgaria, Serbia, Montenegro, Albania, Bosnia, Greece and Turkey and with expatriates and emigrants originally from these regions. Related genres are Bulgarian Chalga (manele brought by Romanian visitors to Bulgaria is referred to as "Romanian chalga"), Greek modern Skiladiko and Serbian Turbo-folk, each one being a mixture of local folk Greek, Bulgarian and Serbian influences over a pop tune.

== History ==
Early references to the terms manea and manele appear in Romanian texts from the late 18th and early 19th century, during the period of Turkish suzerainty over the Romanian principalities, as a genre of dance music brought by Roma from Istanbul.

In the 1960s a type of lăutarească manea appeared, by adding texts to the geampara, a type of lăutaresc genre of Turkish origin.

The modern manele originated in the 1980s and early 1990s as translations and imitations of Turkish and Arabic songs. A well known Romanian manele singer, Adrian Copilul Minune traces it to a genre known as "turceasca" (Turkish).

The genre has been rocked by accusations of plagiarism a number of times, with manele singers adapting popular songs from Greece, Bulgaria, Serbia and Turkey, without giving due credit. The accusations increased especially after the hit "De ce mă minți" ("Why are you lying to me?") proved to be a mere cover of Despina Vandi's song "M'agapas"/"Ah kardoula mou". Further plagiarism accusations surrounded a well known manele singer's track called "Supărat" ("Upset") which was proven by third parties to be plagiarized from a Croatian song (Umoran by Jasmin Stavros). Although this song was not technically a manea, it furthered the controversy surrounding this music genre and Romania's image. Most radio and television channels or media boycott manele music.

== Characteristics ==
The difference between old and modern (contemporary) manea rhythmic pattern

Manele is a mixture of "oriental" Romanian folk and contemporary pop music with bases on Balkan influences The lyrics usually refer to themes of love, enemies, money, alcoholism and difficulties of life in general, or some of the songs are specifically dedicated to parties, weddings, funerals, etc. Manele style contains objections to music primitiveness and low performance.

== Subject matter and style ==
Manele are widely criticized for their lyrical content, which often consists of boasts about the singer's supposed sex appeal, intellect, wealth, social status, and superiority over so-called "enemies". Many singers use bad grammar, repetitive and simplistic rhymes suitable for chanting and are sometimes vulgar and/or misogynistic. Singers sometimes make trilling or yelling sounds during instrumental parts of their songs, an aspect that has been parodied many times.

Some manele also have music videos, of which many are of poor quality while others are recorded in nightclubs or during private parties.

Manele composers and players also use the term "oriental music" or "party music" for their creation, and consider their music a sub-genre of traditional, folk Roma music.

Traditional Roma music is usually played on classical instruments by a live band (taraf) of lăutari and has classical lyrics, while manele is usually sung by only one performer using modern instruments (generally synthesizers) as backup. Most manele are recorded in small recording studios, owned by the singer himself or by a group of singers, since major recording labels refuse to contract them. However, there are some exceptions: for example, Stana Izbașa and Nicu Paleru sing live, often with traditional instruments.

== Etymology and usage ==
The word "manea" is of Turkish origin: mâni is a form of Turkish folk song, in form of quatrains. The word "manea" is the singular form and it refers to the musical piece itself, as belonging to Manele genre. The accent is on the second syllable: maneá.

The plural version, more commonly used, manele, refers to:

- the musical genre (e.g.: "I'm listening to manele.", in Romanian: "Ascult Manele.")
- two or more manea songs (e.g.: "What are the latest manele (songs) you know?", in Romanian: "Care sunt cele mai noi manele pe care le știi?)

The adjective form of the word is manelist, which is sometimes used in Romanian with a pejorative figurative form.

== Fashion ==
Manelists have created a distinct image on the Romanian music scene, by showing their own fashion style. Many of the manelists use luxurious and casual, even styles combined altogether to form the specific manele fashion. Typical manele apparel includes flashy jewelry and affordable luxury clothing brands (such as Versace, Armani or Dolce & Gabbana) or certain sport brands (especially Nike). Such brands are an important part of manele culture, and they are even featured sometimes in lyrics.

== Public opinion ==
Manele are a strongly disputed genre in Romania, with many representatives of Romanian upper-middle and intellectual class opposing this "musical" movement (and its popularization) mostly because of its usage of faulty grammar, overly simplistic or childish lyrics and subject matter and/or encouragement of demeaning behaviours towards other people, as well as an antisocial overall message. The fact that manele lyrics are considered by many to be rude and of poor taste, coupled with widespread racism against Romani, who account for the bulk of manele performers, has led to increasing hostility between fans and opponents. This has generated frequent conflicts between the two, often in the form of internet flame wars.

In the media, manele have been repeatedly called by journalists and academics (such as the literary critic George Pruteanu) "pseudo-music", "pure stupidity, inculture and blah-blah" or even "society's bed-wetter". C. Tepercea, a National Audio-visual Board member who did a study on the genre for the board considered it "the genre for the mentally challenged" in an interview. Even proposals to ban this type of music have been voiced.

Romani-Romanian classical musician and politician Mădălin Voicu distinguishes between the original genre and today's interpreters, calling their work "kitsch and bad taste", "bad merchandise, easy to sing, and only sold to fools at a high price", but considers them to be "harmful", "simple music and brain damaging", "a representation of the lack of musical culture in society" and "a fad that is poised to vanish in the future".

Romanian-American professor Cezar Giosan further compares the genre in an article in Dilema Veche with the early stages of rock-and-roll (and Elvis), early rap and reggaeton, music starting out from the outcast classes of society, being shunned by the higher classes for the simple reason of its origin, only to explode into mainstream later on. The same professor considers the genre as being a form of originality coming from below, with the singers having a genuine (albeit rough and uneducated) talent in music, with the lyrics being just a reflection of basic, simple human needs. In a similar vein, Sorin Adam Matei, an associate professor of communication at Purdue University, US, affirmed in an opinion piece for Evenimentul Zilei that manele are a creole genre, a simple, but lively music, spawned by the meeting of many cultures, that has a chance to succeed as a cultural style if it is polished and "cleaned up". Both consider that manele is a valuable representation of Romanian popular culture, and would like it encouraged. Famous Romani-Romanian violin player Florin Niculescu said that manele singers are talented, but lack musical education.

On Romanian television stations, manele performers and music are particularly seen on specialized manele television stations, such as Taraf TV or Manele TV. While mainstream radio stations do not air manele, a lot of smaller stations do, especially in Romania's capital, Bucharest. Occasionally, manele interpreters appear on New Year's Eve programs on television stations.

== Prohibition ==
Manele have been prohibited in some cities of Romania in public transport, taxis or festivals.

== Notable performers ==
=== Pre 1984: Manele lăutărești ===
- Brothers Gore (Aurel and Victor Gore) - instrumental manele
- Gabi Luncă
- Romica Puceanu

=== 1984–1991: First modern manele (adding electronic sound) ===
- Azur (vocalist: Nelu Vlad) - the first band to use electronic beats
- Albatros (vocalist: Iolanda Cristea a.k.a. Naste din Berceni)
- Generic (vocalist: Dan Ciotoi)
- Miracol C (vocalist: Cezar Duțu a.k.a. Cezarică)
- Odeon (vocalist: Costel Geambașu)

=== 1992–2004: Post-revolution period ===
- Dan Armeanca - considered the godfather of Romani pop
- Adrian Minune (previously Adrian Copilul Minune, Adi de Vito)
- Costi Ioniță
- Carmen Șerban

=== 2004–present: Contemporary manele ===
Popular performers include Florin Salam, Nicolae Guță, Vali Vijelie, Sandu Ciorba, Tzanca Uraganu, Costel Biju, Dani Mocanu, and DeSanto.

== See also ==
- Chalga, in Bulgaria
- Laïko, in Greece
- Turbo-folk, in Serbia
- Rabiz, in Armenia
- Tallava, in Albania
- Music of Lebanon, in Lebanon
- Arabic pop music, in the Arab world

== Sources ==
- The notes of a conference on manele at the "National Peasant Museum"
- Interview with ethnomusicologist Speranţa Rădulescu
