= Vali Vijelie =

Romanian manele singer

Vali Vijelie (born 7 July 1970) is a popular manele singer in Romania, of Romani ethnicity. His real name is Valentin Rusu. He has released several hits on his own (like "Vino in Braţele Mele" or "Glumeşte in Iubire") as well as with other artists like Adrian Minune, Adi de la Vâlcea ("Mi-ai Zapacit Înima", "Aseara Te Am Sunat") and Costi Ioniţă ("Ninge Iar").

Album	Release year
Nu Ma Uita	2000
O iubire imposibila	2001
Mi-e dor de tine	2004
Frumoasă ești - Best of...	2005
Best of Vali Vijelie - Mai stai	2014
Mare mea iubire	2014
A prins voce inima	2016
De-ai face Doamne alt pământ	2018
Da Doamne sa nu mai mor	2022
