= Nicu Paleru =

- Born: 1973 (age 51–52); Pitești, Muntenia, Romania
- Genres: Manele • lautareasca • pop

Nicu Paleru (born April 23, 1973, Pitești, Muntenia) is a well-known Romanian manele musician. Part of the party music since the early 1990s, he finally attained national success in the late 1990s with the help of a Romanian TV show dedicated to party music.
