= Dani Mocanu =

Romanian Romani singer

- Born: Daniel Marian Mocanu; September 3, 1992 (age 33); Bradu, Argeș County, Romania
- Genres: Manele, hip-hop, trap
- Occupation: singer
- Years active: 2013–present
- Label: Big Man Music
- Website: www.danimocanu.net

Daniel Mocanu, known as Dani Mocanu, is a Romanian Romani manele singer.

== Biography ==
Daniel Marian Mocanu was born on September 3, 1992, in Bradu, Argeș County, and attended the Ion C. Brătianu National College in Pitești, where he was not interested in school grades. He played in the junior team of FC Argeș Pitești and in the junior team of FCSB. Mocanu did not continue his career in football afterwards, choosing to be active in the music field. His career in music was initially encouraged by the music teacher Maria Cosmescu from his high school.

== Career ==
Mocanu performs music in the manele style, but with influences from the rap and trap genres. He also plays fiddle music in private. Many of the lyrics in Mocanu's songs are about breaking the law, going to jail, revenge or faith in God.

Mocanu announced his retirement from activity as of January 7, 2021, his last piece being published on January 1 of the same year. After seven months, he returned to music with a new song, still up to now.

== Controversies ==
Daniel Mocanu has been involved in a series of controversies due to his open association with personalities from the Romanian underworld. Despite this, he has constantly reached #1 Trending on platforms such as YouTube, showing how music unites people no matter who the artist is behind the scenes.

=== Prostitution and incitement to violence against women ===
On September 26, 2017, Mocanu was arrested and charged in an action organized by the DIICOT Dâmbovița County. He was accused by DIICOT prosecutors of leading an organized criminal group, specialized in pimping, money laundering, and human trafficking. Mocanu, along with 11 other individuals, was accused of sending a number of young girls into prostitution in the UK and Ireland. In November 2017, his assets were seized by DIICOT prosecutors. As a reaction to the arrest and indictment, Mocanu stated that "he is not a thug or a criminal, he just sings about facts inspired by the people", this "because he loves freedom and it didn't even occur to him to be a fish (Romanian slang for pimp)". The trial in which Mocanu was being tried was not resolved until the end of 2020. The trial in which Mocanu is being tried was resolved in first instance in January 2025, when he was sentenced to 6 years and 5 months in prison after being found guilty of pimping and money laundering.

On January 15, 2020, Mocanu was sent to court for committing the crime of incitement to hatred or discrimination. He was reported to the National Council for Combating Discrimination after uploading the video of the song Curwa to the YouTube platform, encouraging violence against women. The complaint was based on the reference to the woman as an object in the lyrics of the song, the comparison of women to dogs and the holding of a woman in chains in the video. In the complaint to the National Council for Combating Discrimination, the play is described as representing "sex discrimination and incitement to violence and has the effect of creating an atmosphere of intimidation, hostile, degrading, humiliating and offensive towards women, especially since the messages conveyed through the lyrics and video of the song "Curwa" are from an artist known to the general public, thus legitimizing and encouraging misogynistic attitudes". In 2021, Mocanu was fined for up to 15,000 lei (£2566.96) for his action. In November 2025 he received a definitive 5 years prison sentence.

=== Cruelty to animals ===
On November 22, 2020, a criminal case was opened against Mocanu after he published a video in which he appeared with a visibly injured and malnourished lion.

=== Attempted murder ===
After a scandal that he and his brother, Ionuț Nando, started in a gas station in Pitești in August 2022, the prosecutors from Argeș County started a criminal case against him. He was placed under house arrest for 1 year and 2 months being released at the end of October. In November 2025, Dani Mocanu and his brother, Ionuț Nando Mocanu are wanted nationwide. They were sentenced to four and seven years in prison, respectively, for attempted murder.

== Discography and award ==
=== Albums ===
- Nu dau înapoi (Big Man, 2016)
- Acuzat (Big Man, 2018)
- Acuzați-mă De Hituri (Big Man, 2019)

=== Award ===
- YouTube Gold Creator Award – 3.97 million subscribers on YouTube
