= Adrian Minune =

Romanian manele singer (born 1974)

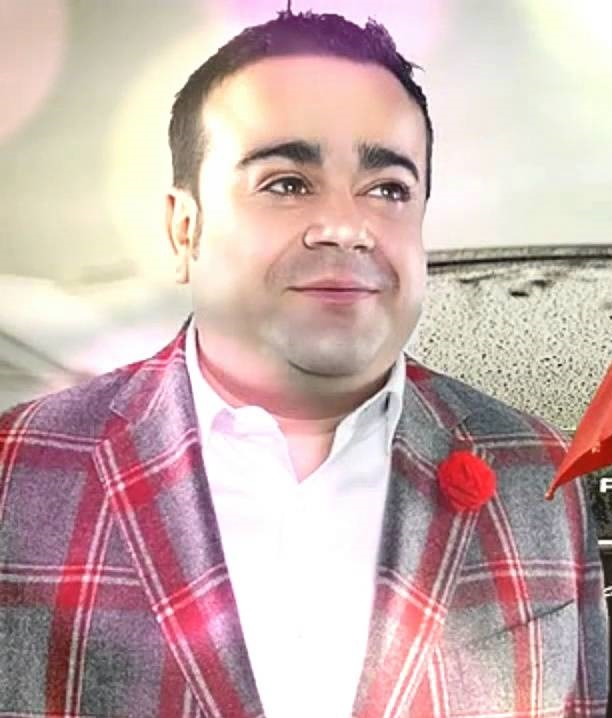

Background information
- Born: Adrian Simionescu; 24 September 1974 (age 52)
- Years active: 1989–present

Adrian Minune (real name Adrian Simionescu, born 24 September 1974) is a Romanian manele singer of Romani descent. He was born in the Ștefăneștii de Jos commune near Bucharest.

He experienced success in the early 2000’s with popular songs such as: “Jumătate tu, Jumătate eu”, “Așa sunt zilele mele”, “Chef de Chef” and “Au inima mea”. He is also recognised by his small stature, previously using the stage name Adrian Copilul Minune (Adrian the Wonder Kid). He is one of the most popular singers in Romania.

== Personal life ==
Adrian Minune married his longtime life-partner Elena in 2004; they have two daughters and a son. His mother, Florenţa, who raised him as a single parent from when he was two years old, also lives with them.

== Filmography ==
He has made appearances in:

- Gadjo dilo (1997) as L'Enfant Prodige
- The Rage (Furia) (2002) as himself

== See also ==
- Manele
- Lăutari
- Nicolae Guţă
- Costi Ioniţă
