= Nicolae Guță =

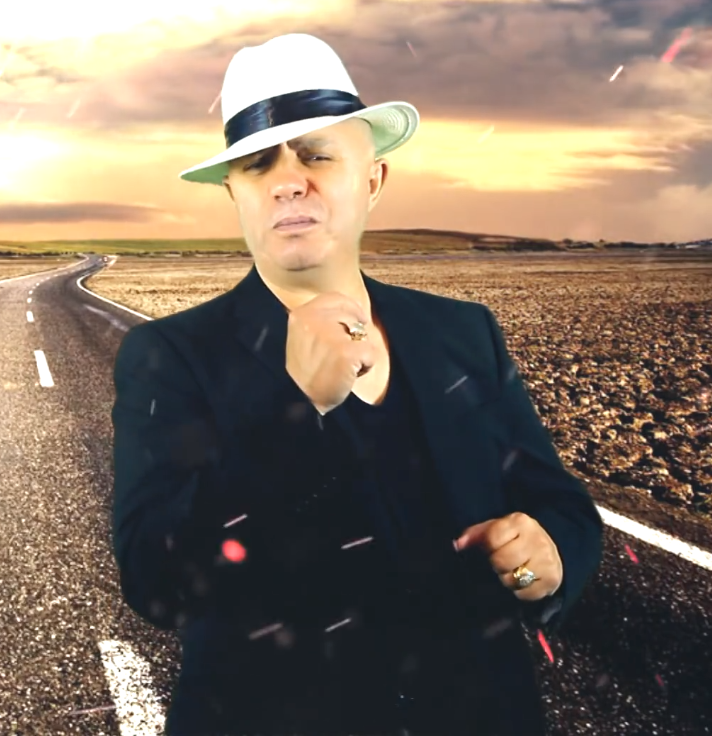

Background information
- Also known as: Regele Manelelor
- Born: Nicolae Linguraru; December 3, 1967 (age 58); Petroșani, Hunedoara, Romania
- Genres: Manele • pop • dance-pop • Romani music
- Occupation: Musician
- Instruments: Accordion, voice
- Years active: 1992–present

Nicolae Guță (born 3 December 1967) is a Romanian Roma manele singer from Petroșani.

== Musical career ==
Guță started as a singer and accordionist in the late 1980s, playing lăutărească music. He released his debut album in 1992. Two years later, he released his first mainstream hit – "De când te iubesc pe tine" (English: "Since I've Been Loving You"), featured on his second long-play record. His first album for a foreign audience was released in France, in 1996; while Romanian musical critics hardly had any reaction towards his music, the journalists abroad would show their appreciation and dub his music a very modern fashion of Gypsy jazz (including electric guitars and synthesizers).

Starting around 1998 Guță developed a growing interest in manele music, a club-friendly subgenre of Balkans folk music influenced by Turkish and Arab pop, similar to what is known in former Yugoslavia as turbo-folk and narodna and in Bulgaria as chalga. Guță had an important role in the advancement of manele (which were a fairly new musical trend at that time) and brought in influences from Western pop and hip hop music. Some of his songs are: "Aș renunța", "Am greșit și eu", "Dacă vrei", and "Doar tu". In 2007, Guță released a cover version of Hari Mata Hari's "Lejla", the third-placed entry in the Eurovision Song Contest 2006, renaming it "Cine ești?" (Who Are You?).
