= List of Media Forest most-broadcast songs of the 2020s in Romania =

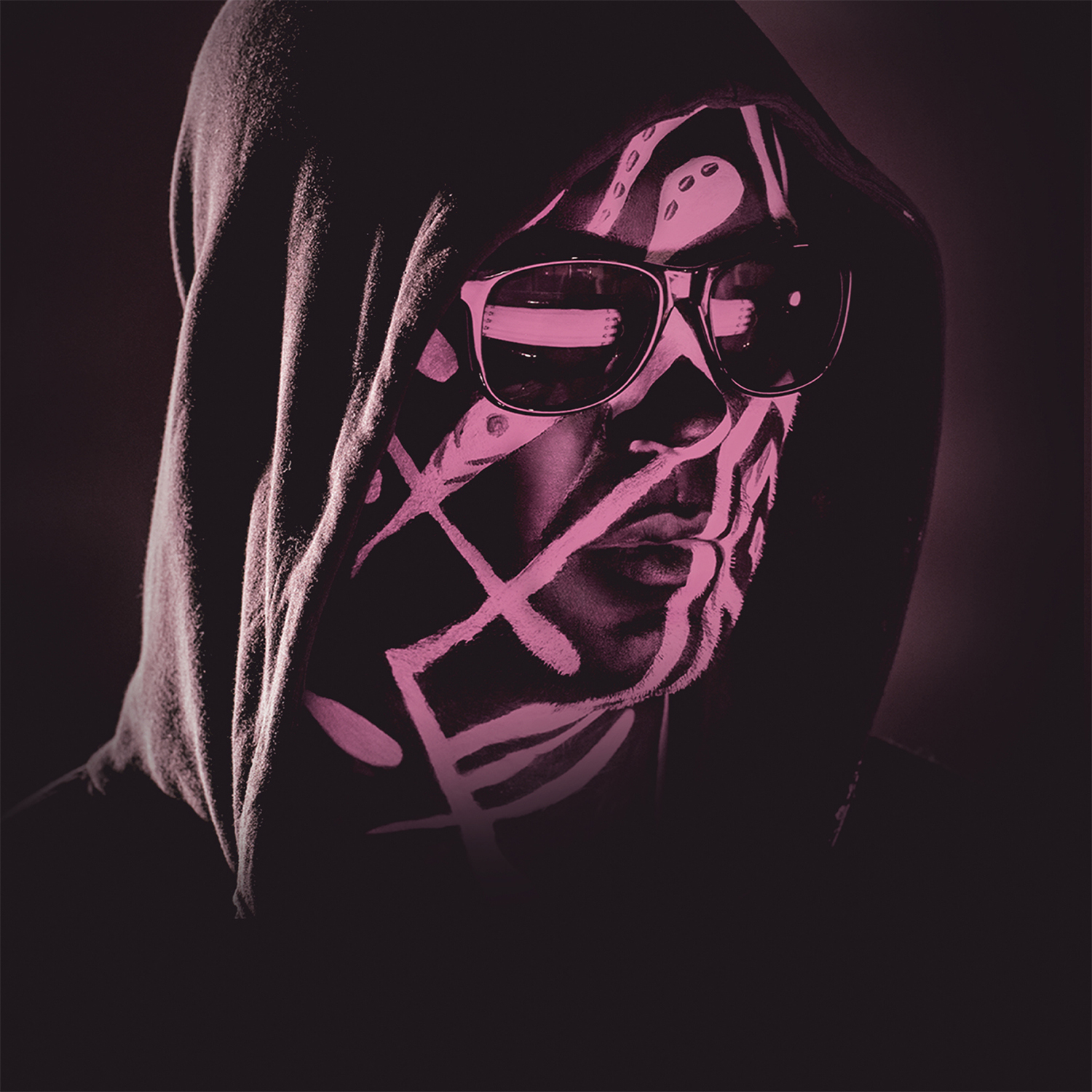
Moldovan group Carla's Dreams (member pictured) has three songs listed as the most-broadcast on radio and television during the 2020s, more than any other act.

Since July 2009, Israeli broadcast monitoring service Media Forest has been publishing four rankings which list the top ten most-broadcast Romanian and foreign songs on Romanian radio stations and television channels separately on a weekly basis. The charts consider data from eight radio stations—Digi FM, Europa FM, Kiss FM, Magic FM, Pro FM, Radio ZU, Radio România Actualități and Virgin Radio Romania—as well as five television channels—1 Music Channel, Kiss TV, MTV Romania, UTV Romania and ZU TV. Chart placings are based on the number of times tracks are broadcast, determined by acoustic fingerprinting.

Media Forest also releases year-end charts in regards to the radio airplay, listing the most-broadcast songs of Romanian origin (Note: Media Forest also includes Moldovan artists such as Carla's Dreams and the Motans on the chart.) of the respective year, weighted by the official audience numbers provided by Asociația pentru Radio Audiență (Romanian Association for Audience Numbers). As of 2026, around 50 singles each have been listed by Media Forest as the most-broadcast tracks on radio and television. The first were "Trika Trika" by Faydee and Antonia (radio) and "Dance Monkey" by Tones and I (television).

"Breaking Me" by Topic and A7S spent 14 weeks as the most-broadcast single on radio stations, the most of any in the 2020s, while in terms of television airplay, this feat was achieved by "Astronaut in the Ocean" by Masked Wolf with a total of 30 weeks. Carla's Dreams had three songs listed as the most-broadcast on radio and television during the 2020s, more than any other act. The charts' current top songs are "Mi Chico" by DJ Goja featuring Jason Derulo and Melody (radio) and "Apus de soare" by Rares (television). In terms of radio airplay, reports by Media Forest indicate that Global Records was the most successful label of 2021. Pro FM was the trendsetting radio station in that year, meaning it broadcast Media Forest's top weekly radio songs the most.

== Most-broadcast songs ==
Key
| # | Indicates current most-broadcast song |
| ‡ | Indicates number-one Romanian song of the year (Note: "Seară de seară" by Carla's Dreams topped Media Forest's year-end chart in 2020, although it was not listed as the most-broadcast song on the weekly radio chart. The same applies to Inna's "Flashbacks" in 2021.) |
| ❍ | Indicates song that topped the Romanian listing and was the most-broadcast overall |
| ◁ | Indicates song that topped the foreign listing and was the most-broadcast overall |

=== Radio ===
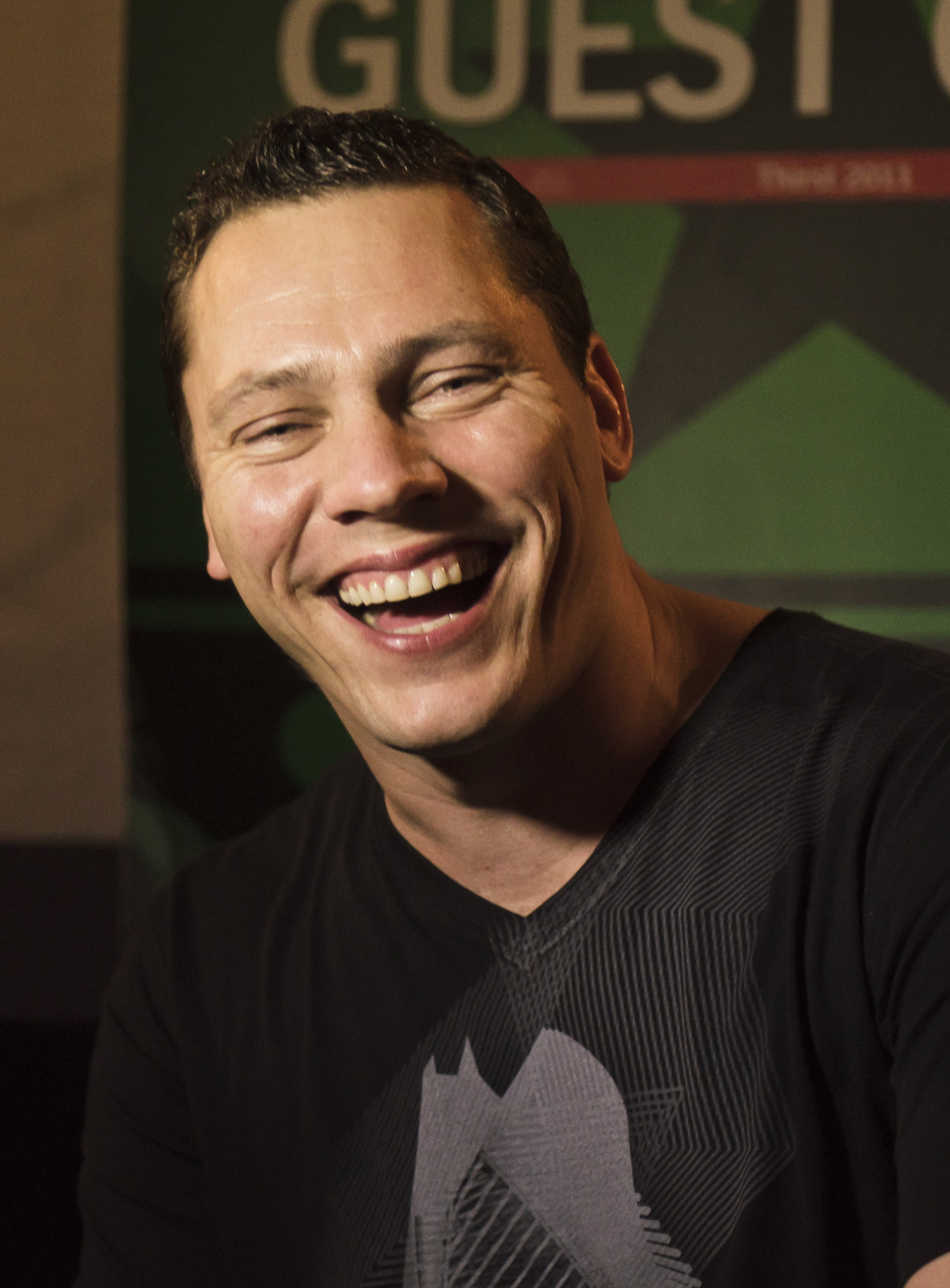
In 2021, Tiësto had the most-aired track on Romanian radio for nine weeks with "The Business".

List of most-broadcast songs on Romanian radio stations in the 2020s
| Artist(s) | Title | Issue date | Wks. |
|---|---|---|---|
| Faydee featuring Antonia | "Trika Trika"❍ | 6 January 2020 | 1 |
| Tones and I | "Dance Monkey"◁ | 13 January 2020 | 1 |
| The Black Eyed Peas and J Balvin | "Ritmo (Bad Boys for Life)"◁ | 20 January 2020 | 3 |
| DJ Project featuring Andia | "Retrograd"❍ | 10 February 2020 | 2 |
| Roxen | "Ce-ți cântă dragostea"❍ | 24 February 2020 | 5 |
| Saint Jhn | "Roses (Imanbek Remix)"◁ | 30 March 2020 | 3 |
| Topic and A7S | "Breaking Me"◁ | 20 April 2020 | 14 |
| Jawsh 685 and Jason Derulo | "Savage Love (Laxed – Siren Beat)"◁ | 27 July 2020 | 1 |
| Surf Mesa featuring Emilee | "ILY (I Love You Baby)"◁ | 3 August 2020 | 1 |
| Jawsh 685 and Jason Derulo | "Savage Love (Laxed – Siren Beat)"◁ | 10 August 2020 | 1 |
| Jawsh 685 and Jason Derulo | "Savage Love (Laxed – Siren Beat)"◁ | 17 August 2020 (Note: Two songs tied for the number one position) | 1 |
| DJ Project featuring Andia | "Slăbiciuni"❍ | 17 August 2020 | 1 |
| DJ Project featuring Andia | "Slăbiciuni"❍ | 24 August 2020 | 2 |
| Surf Mesa featuring Emilee | "ILY (I Love You Baby)"◁ | 7 September 2020 | 1 |
| Master KG featuring Nomcebo | "Jerusalema"◁ | 14 September 2020 | 4 |
| Ofenbach and Quarterhead featuring Norma Jean Martine | "Head Shoulders Knees & Toes"◁ | 12 October 2020 | 1 |
| Jason Derulo | "Take You Dancing"◁ | 19 October 2020 | 3 |
| Ofenbach and Quarterhead featuring Norma Jean Martine | "Head Shoulders Knees & Toes"◁ | 9 November 2020 | 3 |
| Smiley and Delia Matache | "Ne vedem noi"❍ | 30 November 2020 | 7 |
| Iuliana Beregoi | "Cum sună liniștea"❍ | 1 February 2021 | 1 |
| Tiësto | "The Business"◁ | 8 February 2021 | 1 |
| Alina Eremia | "Noi"❍ | 15 February 2021 | 1 |
| Tiësto | "The Business"◁ | 22 February 2021 | 7 |
| Masked Wolf | "Astronaut in the Ocean"◁ | 12 April 2021 | 3 |
| Tiësto | "The Business"◁ | 3 May 2021 | 1 |
| Mahmut Orhan and Sena Şener | "Fly Above"◁ | 10 May 2021 | 1 |
| Riton and Nightcrawlers featuring Mufasa and Hypeman | "Friday (Dopamine Re-edit)"◁ | 17 May 2021 | 3 |
| 3 Sud Est and Andra | "Jumătatea mea mai bună"❍ | 7 June 2021 | 3 |
| Minelli | "Rampampam"❍ | 28 June 2021 | 1 |
| Irina Rimes | "N-avem timp"❍ | 5 July 2021 | 1 |
| Minelli | "Rampampam"❍ | 12 July 2021 | 2 |
| Irina Rimes | "N-avem timp"❍ | 26 July 2021 | 2 |
| Ed Sheeran | "Bad Habits"◁ | 9 August 2021 | 2 |
| Carla's Dreams and Emaa | "N-aud"❍ | 23 August 2021 | 8 |
| Florian Rus | "Pură ficțiune"❍ | 18 October 2021 | 3 |
| Pink and Willow Sage Hart | "Cover Me in Sunshine"◁ | 8 November 2021 | 1 |
| Carla's Dreams and Emaa | "N-aud"❍ | 15 November 2021 | 1 |
| Elton John and Dua Lipa | "Cold Heart (Pnau remix)"◁ | 22 November 2021 | 1 |
| Andia | "Sfârșitul lumii"❍ | 29 November 2021 | 4 |
| Inna | "Up"❍ | 27 December 2021 | 4 |
| Andia | "Sfârșitul lumii"❍ | 24 January 2022 | 2 |
| Inna | "Up"❍ | 7 February 2022 | 5 |
| Carla's Dreams | "Victima"❍ | 7 March 2022 | 6 |
| Jaymes Young | "Infinity"◁ | 18 April 2022 | 1 |
| Irina Rimes | "Ba ba ba (Inima mea bate)"❍ | 25 April 2022 | 1 |
| Randi and Roxen | "Dincolo de Marte"❍ | 2 May 2022 | 1 |
| Holy Molly and Tata Vlad | "Plouă"❍ | 9 May 2022 | 1 |
| Irina Rimes | "Ba ba ba (Inima mea bate)"❍ | 16 May 2022 | 2 |
| Holy Molly and Tata Vlad | "Plouă"❍ | 30 May 2022 | 2 |
| Irina Rimes | "Ba ba ba (Inima mea bate)"❍ | 13 June 2022 | 1 |
| The Motans and Inna | "Tare"❍ | 20 June 2022 | 1 |
| Killa Fonic and Delia | "Cum am știut"❍ | 27 June 2022 | 1 |
| Harry Styles | "As It Was"◁ | 4 July 2022 | 2 |
| Smiley and Juno | "Scumpă foc"❍ ‡ | 18 July 2022 | 3 |
| Wrs | "Llámame"❍ | 8 August 2022 | 2 |
| Smiley and Juno | "Scumpă foc"❍ ‡ | 22 August 2022 | 3 |
| Meduza and James Carter featuring Elley Duhé and Fast Boy | "Bad Memories"◁ | 12 September 2022 | 4 |
| David Guetta and Bebe Rexha | "I'm Good (Blue)"◁ | 10 October 2022 | 8 |
| Sam Smith and Kim Petras | "Unholy"◁ | 5 December 2022 | 1 |
| Andia | "La nevedere"❍ | 12 December 2022 | 3 |
| Sam Smith and Kim Petras | "Unholy"◁ | 2 January 2023 | 1 |
| Andia | "La nevedere"❍ | 9 January 2023 | 1 |
| Sam Smith and Kim Petras | "Unholy"◁ | 16 January 2023 | 1 |
| David Guetta and Bebe Rexha | "I'm Good (Blue)"◁ | 23 January 2023 | 1 |
| Andia | "La nevedere"❍ | 30 January 2023 | 2 |
| Miley Cyrus | "Flowers"◁ | 13 February 2023 | 7 |
| Connect-R featuring Raluka | "Lasa-Ma Sa Te..."❍ | 3 April 2023 | 6 |
| Misha Miller | "Un minut"❍ | 15 May 2023 | 4 |
| Alexia | "Interstelar"❍ | 12 June 2023 | 2 |
| Andra and Andrei Bănuță | "Nu m-am gândit la despărțire"❍ | 26 June 2023 | 4 |
| Alexia | "Interstelar"❍ | 24 July 2023 | 1 |
| Emaa featuring Macanache | "Cât mai lejer"❍ | 31 July 2023 | 1 |
| Alexia | "Interstelar"❍ | 7 August 2023 | 1 |
| Nicole Cherry featuring Tata Vlad | "Nu mai consum"❍ | 14 August 2023 | 2 |
| Puya featuring Iraida | "Opriți planeta"❍ | 28 August 2023 | 6 |
| ADI featuring Holy Molly | "Totul meu"❍ | 9 October 2023 | 1 |
| 3 Sud Est featuring Andia | "Inseparabili"❍ | 16 October 2023 | 1 |
| ADI featuring Holy Molly | "Totul meu"❍ | 23 October 2023 | 3 |
| Andia featuring Deliric | "Pentru ca"❍ | 13 November 2023 | 8 |
| Nicole Cherry featuring Puya | "Paharul sus"❍ | 8 January 2024 | 2 |
| Smiley | "Oameni"❍ | 22 January 2024 | 1 |
| Nicole Cherry featuring Puya | "Paharul sus"❍ | 28 January 2024 | 1 |
| Tyla | "Water"◁ | 5 February 2024 | 4 |
| Theo Rose featuring Andrei Ursu | "Noaptea ne fură iubiri"❍ | 4 March 2024 | 8 |
| Cyril | "Stumblin' In"◁ | 29 April 2024 | 3 |
| Andia | "De la DeLa"❍‡ | 20 May 2024 | 5 |
| Benson Boone | "Beautiful Things"◁ | 24 June 2024 | 2 |
| Artemas | "I Like the Way You Kiss Me"◁ | 8 July 2024 | 2 |
| The Limba, Misha Miller, and Andro featuring Dyce | "Mamma Mia"❍ | 22 July 2024 | 6 |
| Adam Port featuring Stryv, Keinemusik, Orso, and Malachii | "Move"◁ | 2 September 2024 | 4 |
| Irina Rimes | "Dudadu"❍ | 30 September 2024 | 2 |
| Hugel, Topic, and Arash featuring Daecolm | "I Adore You"◁ | 7 October 2024 | 4 |
| Sevdaliza, Pabllo Vittar and Yseult | "Alibi"◁ | 4 November 2024 | 1 |
| Hugel, Topic, and Arash featuring Daecolm | "I Adore You"◁ | 11 November 2024 | 3 |
| Chappell Roan | "Good Luck, Babe!"◁ | 2 December 2024 | 1 |
| Rosé featuring Bruno Mars | "Apt."◁ | 9 December 2024 | 5 |
| Misha Miller featuring Alex Velea | "Bam Bam"❍ | 13 January 2025 | 4 |
| David Guetta featuring Alphaville and Ava Max | "Forever Young"◁ | 10 February 2025 | 6 |
| Lola Young | "Messy"◁ | 24 March 2025 | 1 |
| David Guetta featuring Alphaville and Ava Max | "Forever Young"◁ | 31 March 2025 | 1 |
| Irina Rimes | "Să nu uiți cât te-am iubit"❍ | 7 April 2025 | 1 |
| Lola Young | "Messy"◁ | 14 April 2025 | 3 |
| Rares | "Cel mai fericit de pe pǎmânt"❍‡ | 5 May 2025 | 11 |
| Alex Warren | "Ordinary"◁ | 21 July 2025 | 1 |
| Rares | "Cel mai fericit de pe pǎmânt"❍‡ | 28 July 2025 | 1 |
| The Urs | "Ancora"❍ | 4 August 2025 | 1 |
| Irina Rimes | "Hora fetelor"❍ | 11 August 2025 | 1 |
| Lazy Ed featuring Mario Fresh | "Îmi place când"❍ | 18 August 2025 | 1 |
| Irina Rimes | "Hora fetelor"❍ | 25 August 2025 | 2 |
| Ed Sheeran | "Sapphire"◁ | 8 September 2025 | 3 |
| Mira | "Cu Tălpile Goale"❍ | 29 September 2025 | 3 |
| Akcent featuring Sera and Misha Miller | "Don't Leave"❍ | 20 October 2025 | 1 |
| Mira | "Cu Tălpile Goale"❍ | 27 October 2025 | 1 |
| Akcent featuring Sera and Misha Miller | "Don't Leave"❍ | 3 November 2025 | 2 |
| David Guetta featuring Teddy Swims and Tones and I | "Gone Gone Gone"◁ | 17 November 2025 | 1 |
| Florian Rus featuring Inna | "7 zile"❍ | 24 November 2025 | 11 |
| Vescan featuring Andrei Banuta | "Old Friend"❍ | 9 February 2026 | 10 |
| Emaa | "Noaptea"❍ | 20 April 2026 | 3 |
| Bebe Rexha featuring Faithless | "New Religion"◁ | 11 May 2026 | 1 |
| Emaa | "Noaptea"❍ | 18 May 2026 | 2 |
| The Second Voice | "Let Me Be"◁ | 1 June 2026 | 9 |
| Shakira and Burna Boy | "Dai Dai"◁ | 3 August 2026 | 9 |
| DJ Goja featuring Jason Derulo and Melody | "Mi Chico"❍# | 5 October 2026 | 4 |

=== Television ===
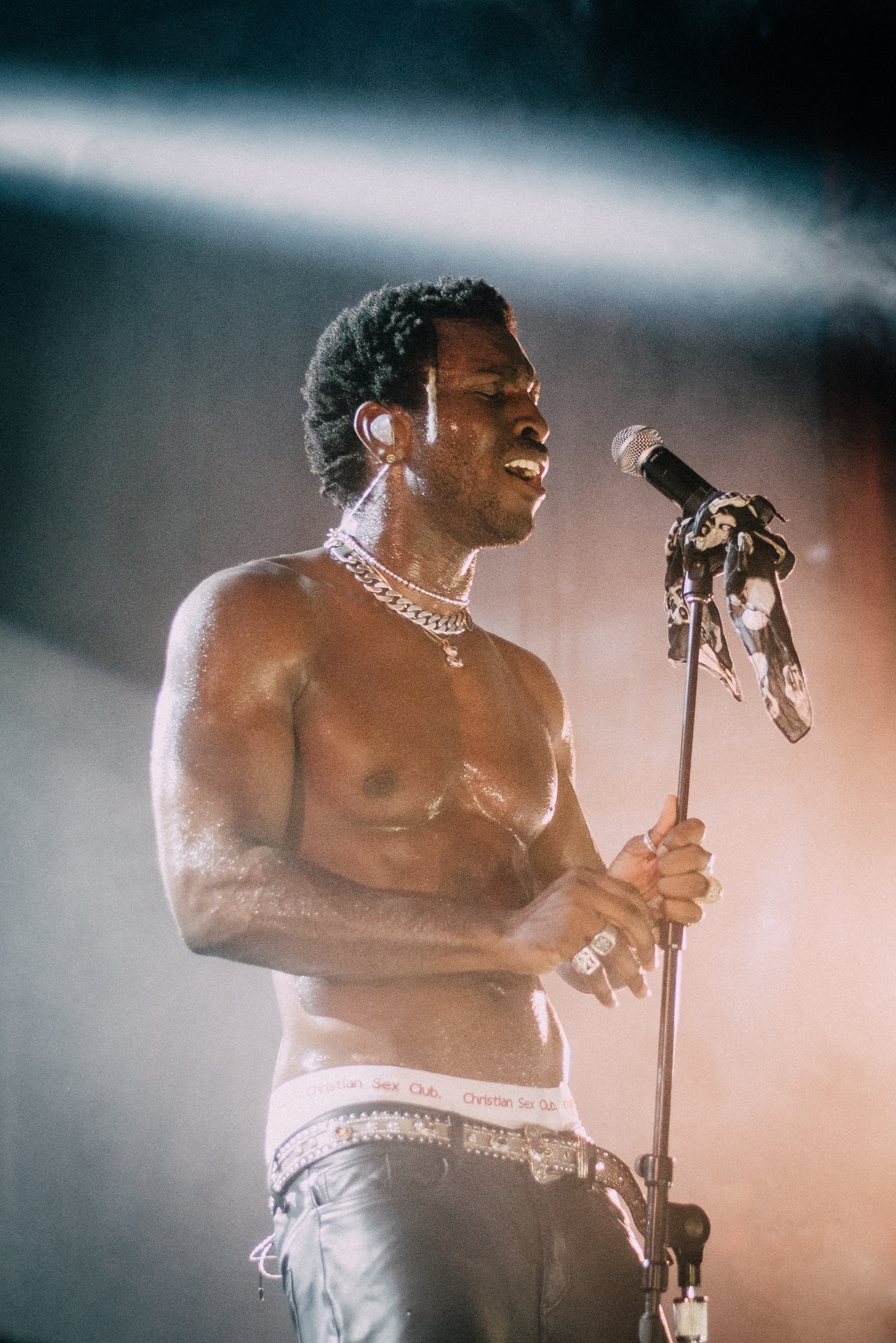
The Imanbek remix of "Roses" by Saint Jhn (pictured) spent 18 weeks as the most-played track on Romanian television in 2020.

List of most-broadcast songs on Romanian television channels in the 2020s
| Artist(s) | Title | Issue date | Wks. |
|---|---|---|---|
| Tones and I | "Dance Monkey"◁ | 6 January 2020 | 5 |
| Maroon 5 | "Memories"◁ | 10 February 2020 | 1 |
| The Black Eyed Peas and J Balvin | "Ritmo (Bad Boys for Life)"◁ | 17 February 2020 | 8 |
| Carla's Dreams | "Seară de seară"❍ | 13 April 2020 | 2 |
| Carla's Dreams | "Seară de seară"❍ | 27 April 2020 | 1 |
| Roxen | "Ce-ți cântă dragostea"❍ | 27 April 2020 | 1 |
| Roxen | "Ce-ți cântă dragostea"❍ | 4 May 2020 | 2 |
| Saint Jhn | "Roses (Imanbek Remix)"◁ | 11 May 2020 | 1 |
| Roxen | "Ce-ți cântă dragostea"❍ | 18 May 2020 | 1 |
| Saint Jhn | "Roses (Imanbek Remix)"◁ | 25 May 2020 | 9 |
| Roxen | "Ce-ți cântă dragostea"❍ | 3 August 2020 | 1 |
| Saint Jhn | "Roses (Imanbek Remix)"◁ | 10 August 2020 | 8 |
| Carla's Dreams | "Seară de seară"❍ | 5 October 2020 | 12 |
| Ofenbach and Quarterhead featuring Norma Jean Martine | "Head Shoulders Knees & Toes"◁ | 4 January 2021 | 1 |
| 24kGoldn featuring Iann Dior | "Mood"◁ | 11 January 2021 | 8 |
| Tiësto | "The Business"◁ | 8 March 2021 | 5 |
| Tiësto | "The Business"◁ | 12 April 2021 | 1 |
| Dua Lipa | "Physical"◁ | 12 April 2021 | 1 |
| Dua Lipa | "Physical"◁ | 19 April 2021 | 2 |
| Masked Wolf | "Astronaut in the Ocean"◁ | 3 May 2021 | 30 |
| Ed Sheeran | "Bad Habits"◁ | 29 November 2021 | 3 |
| Carla's Dreams and Emaa | "N-aud"❍ | 20 December 2021 | 2 |
| Ed Sheeran | "Bad Habits"◁ | 3 January 2022 | 2 |
| Carla's Dreams and Emaa | "N-aud"❍ | 17 January 2022 | 2 |
| Ed Sheeran | "Bad Habits"◁ | 31 January 2022 | 7 |
| Carla's Dreams and Emaa | "N-aud"❍ | 21 March 2022 | 1 |
| Inna | "Up"❍ | 28 March 2022 | 1 |
| Andia | "Sfârșitul lumii"❍ | 4 April 2022 | 3 |
| Inna | "Up"❍ | 25 April 2022 | 1 |
| Gayle | "ABCDEFU"◁ | 25 April 2022 | 1 |
| Gayle | "ABCDEFU"◁ | 2 May 2022 | 1 |
| Jaymes Young | "Infinity"◁ | 9 May 2022 | 1 |
| Randi and Roxen | "Dincolo de Marte"❍ | 16 May 2022 | 4 |
| Irina Rimes | "Ba ba ba (Inima mea bate)"❍ | 13 June 2022 | 1 |
| Holy Molly and Tata Vlad | "Plouă"❍ | 20 June 2022 | 1 |
| Randi and Roxen | "Dincolo de Marte"❍ | 27 June 2022 | 3 |
| Holy Molly and Tata Vlad | "Plouă"❍ | 18 July 2022 | 1 |
| Randi and Roxen | "Dincolo de Marte"❍ | 25 July 2022 | 2 |
| Holy Molly and Tata Vlad | "Plouă"❍ | 8 August 2022 | 1 |
| Randi and Roxen | "Dincolo de Marte"❍ | 15 August 2022 | 3 |
| Irina Rimes | "Ba ba ba (Inima mea bate)"❍ | 5 September 2022 | 2 |
| Harry Styles | "As It Was"◁ | 19 September 2022 | 1 |
| Rema | "Calm Down"◁ | 26 September 2022 | 1 |
| Smiley and Juno | "Scumpă foc"❍‡ | 3 October 2022 | 2 |
| Rema | "Calm Down"◁ | 10 October 2022 | 2 |
| Smiley and Juno | "Scumpă foc"❍‡ | 24 October 2022 | 4 |
| Harry Styles | "As It Was"◁ | 21 November 2022 | 1 |
| Smiley and Juno | "Scumpă foc"❍‡ | 28 November 2022 | 1 |
| Harry Styles | "As It Was"◁ | 5 December 2022 | 2 |
| Rema | "Calm Down"◁ | 26 December 2022 | 1 |
| Harry Styles | "As It Was"◁ | 2 January 2023 | 1 |
| Smiley and Juno | "Scumpă foc"❍‡ | 9 January 2023 | 2 |
| Harry Styles | "As It Was"◁ | 23 January 2023 | 1 |
| David Guetta and Bebe Rexha | "I'm Good (Blue)"◁ | 30 January 2023 | 2 |
| Andia | "La nevedere"❍ | 13 February 2023 | 3 |
| Miley Cyrus | "Flowers"◁ | 6 March 2023 | 17 |
| Alina Eremia featuring Mario Fresh | "Ai fost"❍‡ | 3 July 2023 | 1 |
| Vescan featuring Eva Timush | "Colegi de apartament"❍ | 10 July 2023 | 5 |
| Andra and Andrei Bănuță | "Nu m-am gândit la despărțire"❍ | 14 August 2023 | 4 |
| Vescan featuring Eva Timush | "Colegi de apartament"❍ | 11 September 2023 | 1 |
| Andra and Andrei Bănuță | "Nu m-am gândit la despărțire"❍ | 18 September 2023 | 1 |
| Vescan featuring Eva Timush | "Colegi de apartament"❍ | 25 September 2023 | 1 |
| Puya featuring Iraida | "Opriți planeta"❍ | 2 October 2023 | 17 |
| ADI featuring Holy Molly | "Totul meu"❍ | 28 January 2024 | 2 |
| Andia featuring Deliric | "Pentru ca"❍ | 12 February 2024 | 1 |
| The Urs | "Taramul interzis"❍ | 19 February 2024 | 1 |
| Andia featuring Deliric | "Pentru ca"❍ | 26 February 2024 | 1 |
| The Urs | "Taramul interzis"❍ | 4 March 2024 | 1 |
| Andia featuring Deliric | "Pentru ca"❍ | 11 March 2024 | 3 |
| ADI featuring Holy Molly | "Totul meu"❍ | 1 April 2024 | 1 |
| The Urs | "Taramul interzis"❍ | 8 April 2024 | 1 |
| Andia featuring Deliric | "Pentru ca"❍ | 15 April 2024 | 1 |
| Theo Rose featuring Andrei Ursu | "Noaptea ne fură iubiri"❍ | 22 April 2024 | 16 |
| Alina Eremia | "Nu te mai aștept"❍ | 5 August 2024 | 1 |
| Theo Rose featuring Andrei Ursu | "Noaptea ne fură iubiri"❍ | 12 August 2024 | 4 |
| Alina Eremia | "Nu te mai aștept"❍ | 9 September 2024 | 1 |
| Benson Boone | "Beautiful Things"◁ | 16 September 2024 | 1 |
| Alina Eremia | "Nu te mai aștept"❍ | 23 September 2024 | 1 |
| Grasu XXL | "Tu, Mărie!"❍ | 30 September 2024 | 8 |
| Sevdaliza, Pabllo Vittar, and Yseult | "Alibi"◁ | 25 November 2024 | 1 |
| Iradia featuring Puya | "Las-o așa"❍ | 2 December 2024 | 2 |
| Andra | "Mă întorc acasă"❍ | 16 December 2024 | 6 |
| Jo | "Să curgă șampania"❍ | 27 January 2025 | 2 |
| Iradia featuring Puya | "Las-o așa"❍ | 10 February 2025 | 2 |
| Misha Miller featuring Alex Velea | "Bam Bam"❍ | 24 February 2025 | 2 |
| Rosé featuring Bruno Mars | "Apt."◁ | 10 March 2025 | 4 |
| Theo Rose featuring Smiley | "Ultimul Dans"❍ | 7 April 2025 | 2 |
| Rosé featuring Bruno Mars | "Apt."◁ | 21 April 2025 | 3 |
| Theo Rose featuring Smiley | "Ultimul Dans"❍ | 12 May 2025 | 1 |
| Lidia Buble | "Maria, Maria"❍ | 19 May 2025 | 2 |
| Theo Rose featuring Smiley | "Ultimul Dans"❍ | 2 June 2025 | 1 |
| Lady Gaga featuring Bruno Mars | "Die with a Smile"◁ | 9 June 2025 | 1 |
| Rares | "Cel mai fericit de pe pǎmânt"❍‡ | 16 June 2025 | 11 |
| The Urs | "Ancora"❍ | 1 September 2025 | 3 |
| Irina Rimes | "Hora fetelor"❍ | 22 September 2025 | 3 |
| The Urs | "Ancora"❍ | 13 October 2025 | 6 |
| Mira | "Cu Tălpile Goale"❍ | 24 November 2025 | 2 |
| Lidia Buble | "Maria, Maria"❍ | 15 December 2025 | 1 |
| Mira | "Cu Tălpile Goale"❍ | 22 December 2025 | 12 |
| Andia | "Ultimul revers"❍ | 16 March 2026 | 2 |
| Florian Rus featuring Inna | "7 zile"❍ | 30 March 2026 | 16 |
| Costi, Adrian Saguna, and Benzol | "Solo tu"❍ | 20 July 2026 | 1 |
| Emaa | "Noaptea"❍ | 27 July 2026 | 1 |
| Costi, Adrian Saguna, and Benzol | "Solo tu"❍ | 3 August 2026 | 2 |
| Emaa | "Noaptea"❍ | 17 August 2026 | 2 |
| Rares | "Apus de soare"❍ | 31 August 2026 | 1 |
| Costi, Adrian Saguna, and Benzol | "Solo tu"❍ | 7 September 2026 | 2 |
| Emaa | "Noaptea"❍ | 21 September 2026 | 3 |
| Rares | "Apus de soare"❍ | 12 October 2026 | 2 |
| Emaa | "Noaptea"❍# | 26 October 2026 | 1 |
