= List of number-one singles of the 2020s (Romania) =

Uniunea Producătorilor de Fonograme din România (UPFR) has been publishing charts measuring radio and television airplay in Romania since November 2021, in collaboration with BMAT. In February 2022, Billboard inaugurated Romania Songs, a streaming and digital download-based chart compiled by MRC Data. The following is a list of all documented number ones on the aforementioned two Romanian record charts.

== UPFR charts ==
Key
| # | Indicates current number-one song |

List of number-one songs on the UPFR chart
| Artist(s) | Title | Issue date | Wks. | Ref. |
|---|---|---|---|---|
| Carla's Dreams and Emaa | "N-aud" | 16 November 2021 | 1 | |
| Ed Sheeran | "Bad Habits" | 23 November 2021 | 1 | |
| Carla's Dreams and Emaa | "N-aud" | 30 November 2021 | 1 | |
| Andia | "Sfârșitul lumii" | 7 December 2021 | 3 | |
| Inna | "Up" | 28 December 2021 | 2 | |
| Andia | "Sfârșitul lumii" | 11 January 2022 | 1 | |
| Inna | "Up" | 18 January 2022 | 1 | |
| Andia | "Sfârșitul lumii" | 25 January 2022 | 1 | |
| Keane | "Everybody's Changing" | 1 February 2022 | 1 (Note: The chart for 8 February 2022 has "Everybody's Changing" listed at number one, which would mark its second consecutive week at that position. However, the ranking is mistakenly a duplicate of the one published the previous week. The chart for 15 February 2022 shows that "Up" by Inna had reached number one on the chart dated 8 February while "Everybody's Changing" fell to number three.) | |
| Inna | "Up" | 8 February 2022 | 5 | |
| Jaymes Young | "Infinity" | 15 March 2022 | 1 | |
| Carla's Dreams | "Victima" | 22 March 2022 | 1 | |
| Jaymes Young | "Infinity" | 29 March 2022 | 1 | |
| Farruko | "Pepas" | 5 April 2022 | 1 | |
| Jaymes Young | "Infinity" | 12 April 2022 | 5 | |
| Irina Rimes | "Ba ba ba" | 17 May 2022 | 1 | |
| Jaymes Young | "Infinity" | 24 May 2022 | 1 | |
| Irina Rimes | "Ba ba ba" | 31 May 2022 | 2 | |
| Holy Molly and Tata Vlad | "Plouă" | 14 June 2022 | 1 | |
| The Motans and Inna | "Tare" | 21 June 2022 | 1 | |
| Harry Styles | "As It Was" | 29 June 2022 | 2 | |
| Smiley and Juno | "Scumpă foc" | 12 July 2022 | 6 | |
| WRS | "Llámame" | 23 August 2022 | 1 | |
| Smiley and Juno | "Scumpă foc" | 30 August 2022 | 1 | |
| WRS | "Llámame" | 6 September 2022 | 1 | |
| Smiley and Juno | "Scumpă foc" | 13 September 2022 | 7 | |
| Imagine Dragons | "Believer" | 1 November 2022 | 1 | |
| David Guetta and Bebe Rexha | "I'm Good (Blue)" | 8 November 2022 | 4 | |
| Sam Smith and Kim Petras | "Unholy" | 6 December 2022 | 7 | |
| David Guetta and Bebe Rexha | "I'm Good (Blue)" | 24 January 2023 | 2 | |
| Miley Cyrus | "Flowers" | 7 February 2023 | 11 | |
| Connect-R featuring Raluka | "Lasă-mă să te..." | 25 April 2023 | 1 | |
| Miley Cyrus | "Flowers" | 2 May 2023 | 1 | |
| Connect-R featuring Raluka | "Lasă-mă să te..." | 9 May 2023 | 1 | |
| Alina Eremia and Mario Fresh | "Ai fost" | 16 May 2023 | 2 | |
| Misha Miller | "Un minut" | 30 May 2023 | 3 | |
| Andra and Andrei Bănuță | "Nu m-am gândit la despărțire" | 20 June 2023 | 5 | |
| Alexia | "Interstelar" | 25 July 2023 | 1 | |
| Andra and Andrei Bănuță | "Nu m-am gândit la despărțire" | 1 August 2023 | 1 | |
| Alexia | "Interstelar" | 8 August 2023 | 2 | |
| Smiley | "Aia e" | 22 August 2023 | 1 | |
| 3 Sud Est and Andia | "Inseparabili" | 29 August 2023 | 1 | |
| Puya and Iraida | "Opriți planeta" | 12 September 2023 | 7 | |
| Adi and Holy Molly | "Totul meu" | 31 October 2023 | 2 | |
| Andia featuring Deliric | "Pentru că" | 14 November 2023 | 1 | |
| Adi and Holy Molly | "Totul meu" | 21 November 2023 | 1 | |
| The Urs | "Tărâmul interzis" | 28 November 2023 | 1 | |
| Andia featuring Deliric | "Pentru că" | 5 December 2023 | 5 | |
| The Urs | "Tărâmul interzis" | 9 January 2024 | 1 | |
| Andia featuring Deliric | "Pentru că" | 16 January 2024 | 3 | |
| The Urs | "Tărâmul interzis" | 6 February 2024 | 1 | |
| Tyla | "Water" | 13 February 2024 | 2 | |
| The Urs | "Tărâmul interzis" | 27 February 2024 | 1 | |
| Nicole Cherry and Puya | "Paharul sus" | 5 March 2024 | 1 | |
| Cyril | "Stumblin' In" | 12 March 2024 | 3 | |
| Andrei Ursu and Theo Rose | "Noaptea ne fură iubiri" | 2 April 2024 | 3 | |
| Cyril | "Stumblin' In" | 23 April 2024 | 1 | |
| Andia | "De la dela" | 30 April 2024 | 11 | |
| Artemas | "I Like the Way You Kiss Me" | 16 July 2024 | 1 | |
| The Limba, Misha Miller and Andro featuring Dyce | "Mamma Mia" | 23 July 2024 | 10 | |
| Sevdaliza, Pabllo Vittar and Yseult | "Alibi" | 1 October 2024 | 2 | |
| Hugel, Topic and Arash featuring Daecolm | "I Adore You" | 15 October 2024 | 4 | |
| Sevdaliza, Pabllo Vittar and Yseult | "Alibi" | 12 November 2024 | 1 | |
| Hugel, Topic and Arash featuring Daecolm | "I Adore You" | 19 November 2024 | 1 | |
| Sevdaliza, Pabllo Vittar and Yseult | "Alibi" | 26 November 2024 | 2 | |
| Hugel, Topic and Arash featuring Daecolm | "I Adore You" | 10 December 2024 | 1 | |
| Rosé and Bruno Mars | "Apt." | 17 December 2024 | 1 | |
| Hugel, Topic and Arash featuring Daecolm | "I Adore You" | 24 December 2024 | 1 | |
| Rosé and Bruno Mars | "Apt." | 31 December 2024 | 2 | |
| Misha Miller and Alex Velea | "Bam bam" | 14 January 2025 | 3 | |
| David Guetta, Alphaville and Ava Max | "Forever Young" | 4 February 2025 | 9 | |
| Irina Rimes | "Să nu uiți cât te-am iubit" | 8 April 2025 | 3 | |
| David Guetta, Alphaville and Ava Max | "Forever Young" | 29 April 2025 | 1 | |
| Rareș | "Cel mai fericit de pe pământ" | 6 May 2025 | 11 | |
| The Urs | "Ancora" | 22 July 2025 | 3 | |
| Lazy Ed and Mario | "Îmi place când" | 12 August 2025 | 3 | |
| Irina Rimes | "Hora fetelor" | 2 September 2025 | 4 | |
| Alex Warren | "Ordinary" | 30 September 2025 | 1 | |
| Mira | "Cu tălpile goale" | 7 October 2025 | 8 | |
| Florian Rus featuring Inna | "7 zile" | 2 December 2025 | 4 | |
| Mira | "Cu tălpile goale" | 30 December 2025 | 1 | |
| Florian Rus featuring Inna | "7 zile" | 6 January 2026 | 1 | |
| Vescan and Andrei Bănuță | "Old Friend" | 13 January 2026 | 2 | |
| Florian Rus featuring Inna | "7 zile" | 27 January 2026 | 1 | |
| Vescan and Andrei Bănuță | "Old Friend" | 3 February 2026 | 1 | |
| Florian Rus featuring Inna | "7 zile" | 10 February 2026 | 1 | |
| Vescan and Andrei Bănuță | "Old Friend" | 17 February 2026 | 10 | |
| Kato featuring Jon | "Turn the Lights Off" | 4 May 2026 | 3 | |
| Emaa | "Noaptea" | 25 May 2026 | 2 | |
| Costi, Adrian Șaguna and Benzol | "Solo Tu" | 8 June 2026 | 2 | |
| FIFA Sound | "The Official FIFA World Cup 2026 Theme" | 22 June 2026 | 1 | |
| The Second Voice | "Let Me Be" | 29 June 2026 | 7 | |
| Shakira and Burna Boy | "Dai Dai" | 17 August 2026 | 8 | |
| Hugel, Imael Angel and Ultra Naté | "Movin' to the Sun" | 12 October 2026 | 1 | |
| DJ Goja featuring Jason Derulo and Melody | "Mi Chico"# | 19 October 2026 | 5 | |

== Romania Songs ==
Key
| # | Indicates current number-one song |

List of number-one songs on the Romania Songs chart
| Artist(s) | Title | Issue date | Wks. | Ref. |
|---|---|---|---|---|
| Oana Radu | "Când am o zi grea" | 19 February 2022 | 2 | |
| Tzancă Uraganu and Andrei Despa | "Scoate-mă de la block" | 5 March 2022 | 1 | |
| Mario Fresh and Connect-R | "Umbre" | 12 March 2022 | 1 | |
| Oana Radu | "Când am o zi grea" | 19 March 2022 | 1 | |
| Theo Rose and Andrei Bănuță | "Spune-i mama" | 26 March 2022 | 1 | |
| Oana Radu | "Când am o zi grea" | 2 April 2022 | 2 | |
| Nicole Cherry | "Florile tale" | 16 April 2022 | 1 | |
| Holy Molly and Tata Vlad | "Plouă" | 23 April 2022 | 3 | |
| YNY Sebi and Bogdan DLP | "Tarabanele" | 14 May 2022 | 6 | |
| Mario Fresh and Renvtø | "Necesar" | 25 June 2022 | 7 | |
| Tzancă Uraganu | "Te-am văzut fără inel" | 13 August 2022 | 1 | |
| Bogdan DLP and Daniazis | "Beau pahar după pahar" | 20 August 2022 | 1 | |
| Killa Fonic and Rava | "Brasileira" | 27 August 2022 | 1 | |
| Iuly Neamțu and Manele Mentolate | "Țigancă de București" | 3 September 2022 | 2 | |
| Killa Fonic and Rava | "Brasileira" | 17 September 2022 | 1 | |
| Bogdan DLP, Gheboasă and Lil Cagula | "Dacă n-ai bani" | 24 September 2022 | 7 | |
| Gheboasă and YNY Sebi | "Habibi" | 12 November 2022 | 1 | |
| Andia | "La nevedere" | 19 November 2022 | 3 | |
| Tzancă Uraganu | "Trotinete" | 10 December 2022 | 3 | |
| Rareș and Bogdan DLP | "La tine și la bani" | 31 December 2022 | 4 | |
| Miley Cyrus | "Flowers" | 28 January 2023 | 4 | |
| Jador | "Skinny" | 25 February 2023 | 1 | |
| Tzancă Uraganu | "Alo baza baza" | 4 March 2023 | 3 | |
| Connect-R and Raluka | "Lasă-mă să te..." | 25 March 2023 | 4 | |
| Dani Mocanu and Alex Velea | "Dau în ei ca-n aparate" | 22 April 2023 | 2 | |
| Delia | "Lololo" | 6 May 2023 | 1 | |
| Connect-R and Raluka | "Lasă-mă să te..." | 13 May 2023 | 1 | |
| Delia | "Lololo" | 20 May 2023 | 1 | |
| Bogdan DLP | "Hitana" | 27 May 2023 | 9 | |
| Dani Mocanu and Alex Velea | "Cariceps" | 29 July 2023 | 2 | |
| Bogdan DLP and Ian | "Roma" | 12 August 2023 | 1 | |
| Șatra B.E.N.Z. featuring Alduts Sherdley | "Prietena ta" | 19 August 2023 | 3 | |
| Nicole Cherry | "Aș vrea să mă las de tine" | 9 September 2023 | 1 | |
| Șatra B.E.N.Z. featuring Alduts Sherdley | "Prietena ta" | 16 September 2023 | 4 | |
| Bogdan DLP | "Bax banii" | 14 October 2023 | 3 | |
| LeLe | "Te vreau" | 11 November 2023 | 2 | |
| Alex Botea | "Romeo și Julieta" | 25 November 2023 | 3 | |
| Jador | "Fana" | 16 December 2023 | 8 | |
| Iuly Neamțu | "Iubire în rate" | 10 February 2024 | 1 | |
| Nouă Unșpe, RAVA and Bittner | "Zodiac" | 17 February 2024 | 1 | |
| Tzancă Uraganu | "Burj Khalifa" | 24 February 2024 | 4 | |
| Rareș and Bogdan DLP | "Guli Guli" | 23 March 2024 | 4 | |
| Bogdan DLP | "Habibi" | 20 April 2024 | 2 | |
| Tzancă Uraganu | "Vorba francezului" | 4 May 2024 | 1 | |
| Gya and Babasha | "Baklava" | 11 May 2024 | 5 | |
| Babasha | "Păi naa" | 15 June 2024 | 6 | |
| Dani Mocanu | "Hai să ne iubim ca nemții" | 27 July 2024 | 6 | |
| Denis Ramniceanu | "Merhaba (Stil Turcesc)" | 7 September 2024 | 1 | |
| YNY Sebi and Bogdan DLP | "Lamborghini" | 14 September 2024 | 4 | |
| Karmen and Bogdan DLP | "Complicat" | 12 October 2024 | 2 | |
| Dani Mocanu | "Spania" | 26 October 2024 | 1 | |
| Theo Rose | "A venit poliția (From "Candidatul Perfect" The Movie)" | 2 November 2024 | 7 | |
| Dani Mocanu | "Rusia" | 21 December 2024 | 1 | |
| Costel Biju and Tzancă Uraganu | "Meneaito" | 28 December 2024 | 7 | |
| Luis Gabriel | "Santa Monica" | 15 February 2025 | 1 | |
| Costel Biju x Tzancă Uraganu | "Meneaito" | 22 February 2025 | 1 | |
| Irina Rimes | "Să nu uiți cât te-am iubit" | 1 March 2025 | 3 | |
| Erika Isac and M.G.L. | "Lumea toată" | 22 March 2025 | 2 | |
| Denis Nuca and Letty | "Ba la ea" | 5 April 2025 | 1 | |
| Bogdan DLP and Cristina Pucean | "Macarena" | 12 April 2025 | 1 | |
| Tzancă Uraganu featuring Rareș | "Regele" (From "Buzz House: The Movie 2") | 19 April 2025 | 1 | |
| Rareș | "Cel mai fericit de pe pământ" | 26 April 2025 | 2 | |
| Tzancă Uraganu featuring Mr Juve | "Damelo" | 10 May 2025 | 8 | |
| Johny Romano | "E mult, e greu!" | 5 July 2025 | 11 | |
| Babasha | "Cometa" | 20 September 2025 | 4 | |
| Bogdan DLP and Arianna | "Ce te-aș suna" | 18 October 2025 | 1 | |
| Johny Romano | "E mult, e greu!" | 25 October 2025 | 1 | |
| Florian Rus and Inna | "7 zile" | 1 November 2025 | 2 | |
| Bogdan DLP | "N-a fost să fie" | 15 November 2025 | 1 | |
| Bogdan DLP | "7 zile" | 22 November 2025 | 1 | |
| Florian Rus and Inna | "7 zile" | 29 November 2025 | 1 | |
| Alex Botea | "Voodoo" | 6 December 2025 | 2 | |
| Vescan and Andrei Bănuță | "Old Friend" | 20 December 2025 | 1 | |
| Bogdan DLP | "Aladam" | 27 December 2025 | 5 | |
| Ursaru x LiToo The Purp x Vali Miron x MĂDĂTORRICELLI | "Gagică-ta (Golden Cypher)" | 31 January 2026 | 1 | |
| Petre Ștefan | "Peter Parker" | 7 February 2026 | 2 | |
| Bad Bunny | "DTMF" | 21 February 2026 | 1 | |
| Bad Bunny | "Nuevayol" | 28 February 2026 | 1 | |
| Lele and Petre Ștefan | "Peter Parker (Balkanic version)" | 7 March 2026 | 4 | |
| Vanilla | "Treci peste" | 4 April 2026 | 3 | |
| Lezy Ed and Jo | "Mor după tine" | 25 April 2026 | 3 | |
| MĂDĂTORRICELLI and LiToo The Purp | "Nebunatică" | 16 May 2026 | 1 | |
| Berechet and Vanilla | "Deucess" | 23 May 2026 | 8 | |
| Berechet and Cercel | "La noi e ceartă" | 18 July 2026 | 5 | |
| Vanilla and Alex Velea | "7 din 7" | 22 August 2026 | 2 | |
| Berechet and Cercel | "La noi e ceartă" | 5 September 2026 | 1 | |
| Vanilla and Alex Velea | "7 din 7" | 12 September 2026 | 1 | |
| Berechet and Cercel | "La noi e ceartă" | 19 September 2026 | 1 | |
| Vanilla and Alex Velea | "7 din 7" | 26 September 2026 | 1 | |
| Berechet and Cercel | "La noi e ceartă" | 3 October 2026 | 2 | |
| Babasha | "Nu răsăriți stele" | 17 October 2026 | 2 | |
| Toni de la Brașov & Roberto Buena | "Armăsarul" | 31 October 2026 | 1 | |
| Tzancă Uraganu | "Condeiul cu cerneală neagră"# | 7 November 2026 | 2 | |
