= AMI (Romanian singer) =

Romanian singer and songwriter (born 1989)

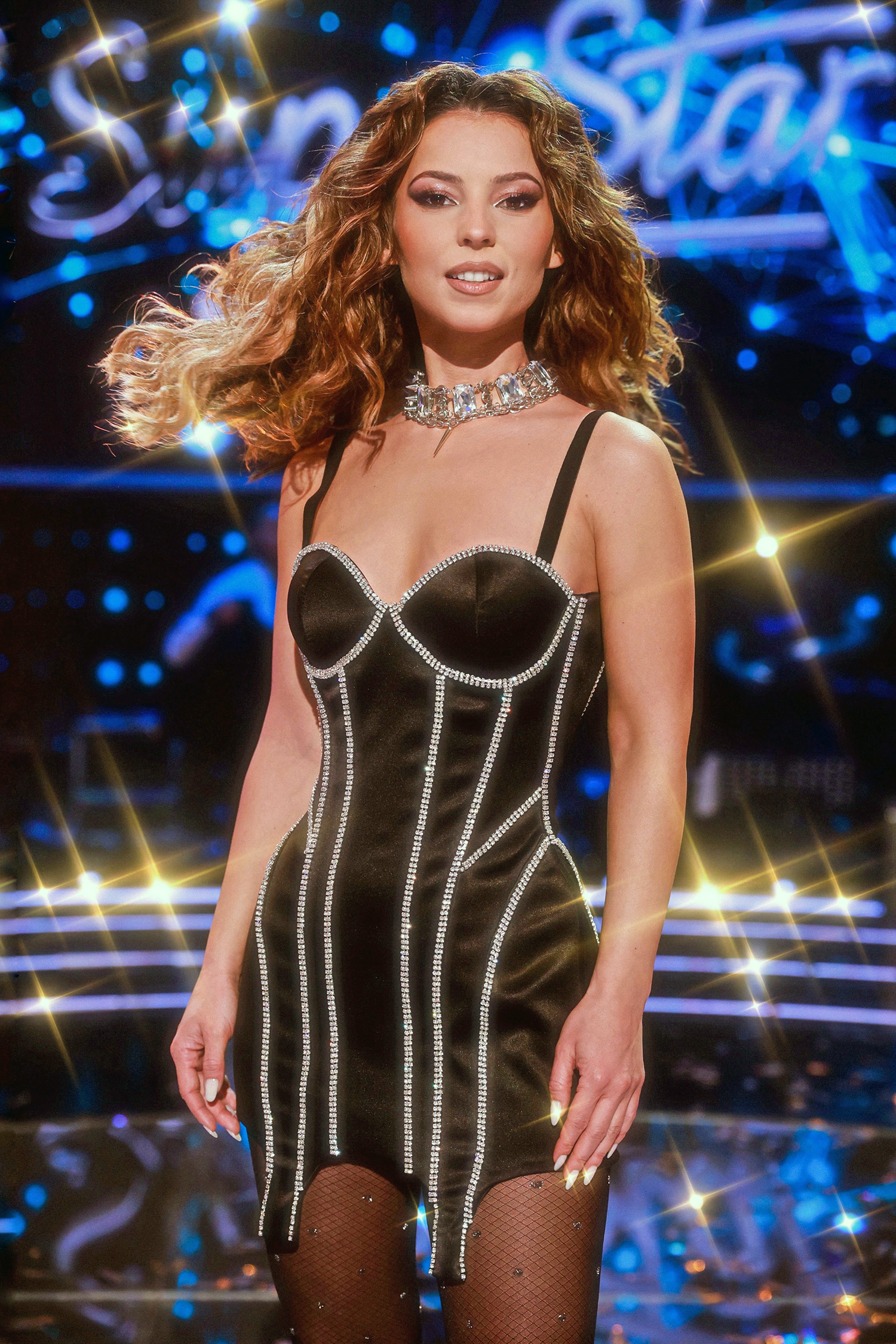
- AMI, on the stage of the SuperStar România 2021
- Born: Andreea Ioana Moldovan; 28 September 1989 (age 36); Baia Mare, Romania
- Education: National University of Music
- Occupations: Singer; songwriter
- Years active: 2012–present
- Musical career
- Genres: Dance
- Labels: Dav7 Music; MediaPro Music; Global

Andreea Ioana Moldovan (born 28 September 1989), professionally known as AMI, is a Romanian singer and songwriter. She rose to fame following her 2012 single "Trumpet Lights" with producer David Deejay.

== Life and career ==
AMI was born on 28 September 1989 in the city of Baia Mare. She made her music debut at the age of 3 after her parents noticed her talent. The first contest she participated in was a local music festival, where she won the grand prize for her performance of the song "Un actor". She attended classes at the Children's Palace in Baia Mare and participated in numerous national and international festivals. She also studied the violin for 12 years.

AMI moved to Bucharest in the 12th grade, took and passed the baccalaureate exam and attended the courses of the National University of Music, Jazz Composition-Light Music section.

Since 2009, the artist has been active in Paula Seling's vocal backing band, and in 2011 she participated in the first edition of the X Factor talent contest, broadcast by Antena 1.

AMI's debut single was released on 27 August 2012 is titled "Trumpet Lights" and is a collaboration with Glance. The song composed by David Deejay reached 3rd place in the Top Airplay 100 and benefited from a video made by Vali Bărbulescu and the VB Visuals team.

In September 2013, AMI was invited to sing the song "Deja Vu" with Grasu XXL. The song enjoyed success, occupying the first position at the top of the most broadcast songs in Romania. For the artist, "Deja Vu" is both the first single in Romanian and a change of musical style. For this single, Grasu XXL and AMI won four awards at the Media Music Awards Gala in September 2014.

AMI accepted the challenges of survival shows and participated in the reality TV shows Ferma vedetelor in 2016 on Pro TV and Exatlon Romania in 2019 on Kanal D.

In 2019, AMI, together with Roxen, Theea Miculescu, Mihai Alexandru Bogdan and Viky Red, composed Roxen's debut single, entitled "Ce-ți cântă dragostea". The song became a hit in early 2020, peaking at number one in the Top Airplay 100 in March, 81 days after its release.

The year 2020 brought her collaborations with B.U.G. Mafia for "8 zile din 7", Killa Fonic for "Antidot", Mark Stam for "Ca să fii fericit", and Florian Rus for "Regrete". In December 2020, AMI won the fifteenth season of the show Te cunosc de undeva!, broadcast by Antena 1.

In 2020, AMI was chosen to dub a character in Romanian in the animated movie Scoob!

On 28 April 2021, the singer released the single "Enigma", a new collaboration with Tata Vlad from B.U.G. Mafia. "Enigma" is the first single from the upcoming album of the same name and reached number 3 in the Top Airplay 100 and remained in the Top 10 for another 12 weeks.

The first single from 2022 is called "Butterfly Dance", which is a collaboration with Sasha Lopez and was released on 28 April.

On 6 October 2023, the song "Nostalgia" was presented, with music composed by David Deejay and AMI, and lyrics written by AMI and Florian Rus.

== Discography ==
AMI discography
- Singles: 35

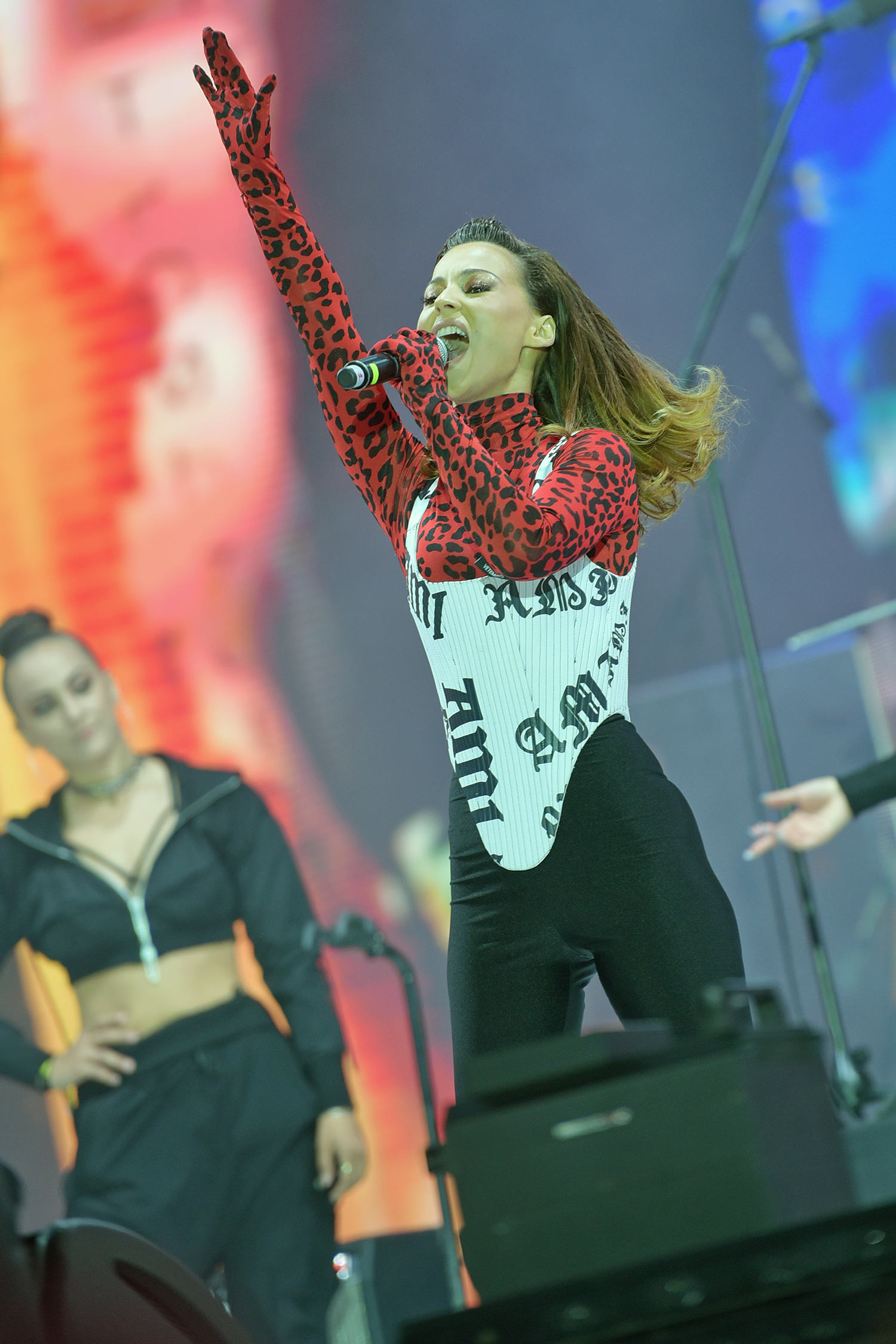
AMI performing at The Artist Awards 2021 on 19 September 2021

=== Singles ===
==== As lead artist ====
List of singles as lead artist
Title	Year	Peak chart positions	Album
Title	Year	ROU	Album
"Trumpet Lights" (featuring Glance) ^{YT}	2012	3	Non-album singles
"Otra vez" ^{YT}	2013	—	Non-album singles
"Playa en Costa Rica" ^{YT}	2014	—	Non-album singles
"Magical" ^{YT}	2014	—	Non-album singles
"Somnu' nu mă ia" ^{YT}	2015	—	Noapte de primăvară
"Camina" ^{YT}	2015	—	Non-album singles
"3 lucruri" (featuring Grasu XXL) ^{YT}	2016	—	Non-album singles
"Te-aștept diseară" ^{YT}	2016	—	Non-album singles
"Un actor" (featuring What's UP) ^{YT}	2017	—	Non-album singles
"Mă omoară" ^{YT}	2017	—	Non-album singles
"Indiferența ta" ^{YT}	2017	—	Non-album singles
"Niște dragoste" ^{YT}	2018	—	Non-album singles
"Hola!" ^{YT}	2018	—	Non-album singles
"Tramvai" ^{YT}	2019	—	Non-album singles
"Ora mea exactă" (The Session) ^{YT}	2019	—	Non-album singles
"Atât de fain" (The Session) ^{YT}	2019	—	Non-album singles
"Moș Crăciun" ^{YT}	2019	—	Non-album singles
"Fotografii" ^{YT}	2020	—	Non-album singles
"Regrete" (featuring Florian Rus) ^{YT}	2020	—	Non-album singles
"Hallelujah" ^{YT}	2020	—	Non-album singles
"Enigma" (featuring Tata Vlad) ^{YT}	2021	3	Non-album singles
"O fată obișnuită" ^{YT}	2021	—	Non-album singles
"Fluturi" ^{YT}	2021	—	Non-album singles
"Dulce simfonie" ^{YT}	2021	—	Non-album singles
"Butterfly Dance" (with Sasha Lopez) ^{YT}	2022	—	Non-album singles
"Nostalgia" ^{YT}	2023	—	Non-album singles
"Un deceniu de iubire" (The Session) ^{YT}	2023	—	Non-album singles
"Ador, Ador" ^{YT}	2024	—	Non-album singles
"UNDEVA" (with NOUĂ UNȘPE) ^{YT}	2024	—	Non-album singles
"INTERSTELAR" ^{YT}	2024	—	Non-album singles
"—" denotes a title that did not chart, or was not released in that territory.

==== As featured artist ====
List of singles as featured artist
Title	Year	Peak chart positions	Album
Title	Year	ROU	Album
"Magnetic" (David Deejay featuring AMI) ^{YT}	2012	—	Non-album singles
"Una serenada" (Mossano featuring AMI) ^{YT}	2012	—	Non-album singles
"Deja Vu" (Grasu XXL featuring AMI) ^{YT}	2013	1	Non-album singles
"I Promise You" (Mossano featuring AMI) ^{YT}	2014	—	Non-album singles
"4 camere" (DJ Project featuring AMI) ^{YT}	2019	—	Non-album singles
"Sunt bine" (Tostogan'S featuring AMI) ^{YT}	2019	—	Non-album singles
"Ca să fii fericit" (Mark Stam featuring AMI) ^{YT}	2020	—	Non-album singles
"Antidot" (Killa Fonic featuring AMI) ^{YT}	2020	—	Non-album singles
"8 zile din 7" (B.U.G. Mafia featuring AMI) ^{YT}	2020	—	Non-album singles
"Să te întorci" (Majii featuring AMI) ^{YT}	2023	—	Non-album singles
"—" denotes a title that did not chart, or was not released in that territory.

== Filmography ==
=== Television ===
Year	Title	Role	Notes
2011	X Factor	Herself as a contestant	Television show broadcast by Antena 1
2016	Ferma vedetelor	Herself as a contestant	Reality television show broadcast by Pro TV
2019	Exatlon Romania	Herself as a contestant	Reality television show broadcast by Kanal D
2020	Te cunosc de undeva!	Herself as a contestant	Television show broadcast by Antena 1
2021	SuperStar România	Herself as a guest	Television show broadcast by Pro TV
2022	Sunt celebru, scoate-mă de aici!	Herself as a contestant	Reality television show broadcast by Pro TV

== Awards and nominations ==
List of awards and nominations received by AMI
Year	Award	Category	Recipient	Result	Ref.
2013	Romanian Music Awards	Best New Act	"Trumpet Lights" (AMI featuring Glance)	Nominated	
2014	Media Music Awards	Best Featuring	"Deja vu" (Grasu XXL featuring AMI)	Won	
2014	Media Music Awards	Best Hip Hop	"Deja vu" (Grasu XXL featuring AMI)	Won	
2014	Media Music Awards	Best YouTube	"Deja vu" (Grasu XXL featuring AMI)	Won	
2014	Media Music Awards	Pro FM Award	"Deja vu" (Grasu XXL featuring AMI)	Won	
2014	Romanian Music Awards	Best Hip Hop	"Deja vu" (Grasu XXL featuring AMI)	Won	
2014	Romanian Music Awards	Best Dance	"I Promise You" (Mossano featuring AMI)	Nominated	
2014	Romanian Music Awards	Best DJ	"I Promise You" (Mossano featuring AMI)	Nominated	
