= David Deejay =

Romanian musician (born 1980)

- Born: Adi Cristian Colceru; December 10, 1980 (age 45)
- Origin: Bârlad, Romania
- Genres: Popcorn, Dance, house
- Occupations: Record producer, DJ
- Years active: 1998–2014, 2026 - present
- Label: DAV7 MUSIC
- Website: https://www.facebook.com/daviddeejayofficial?ref=hl

Adi Cristian Colceru, also known as David Deejay (born December 10, 1980, in Bârlad), is a Romanian former DJ, record producer and composer from Bucharest, Romania. He studied violin in primary school. After moving to Bucharest, he worked with several local producers, and in 2007 started with the hit single "Sexy Thing". He subsequently released several singles after the success of Sexy Thing such as Temptation and Fantasy. He is best known for his long time collaborations with singer Dony from the band Refflex. David Deejay is a pioneer of the Romanian popcorn music style.

== Biography ==
=== Studies and beginnings in music ===
Born in Bârlad, Colceru studied violin at a special school. At the age of 16, he started to mix songs on the computer. In 2003 he moved to Bucharest, where he composed songs at MOF Records for Akcent, TNT, 3rei Sud Est and Hi-Q.

=== David Deejay project ===
Besides time spent in the studio, Colceru appeared as a DJ in clubs under the name DJ David, and in this period he composed his first single "Sexy Thing" where he collaborated with Cornel Donici from the band Refflex which had the nickname "Dony". Colceru wanted the project to remain anonymous. His single, "Sexy Thing" reached the number 1 spot and stationed for 12 weeks in the Romanian Top 100 and number 37 in the Bulgarian Top 100 where it stationed two weeks. In December 2009 he entered the Dutch Top 40 with "Sexy Thing". In the Netherlands he lifts on the success of Eastern European acts like Inna and Edward Maya. "Sexy Thing" won the award for Best Dance Play at the MTV Romania Music Awards 2008, ceremony held at Iaşi. The second single released, "Nasty Dream", was also a collaboration with Dony; the song peaked at number 1 in the top Romanian Top 100. On April 30, 2009, Colceru released two songs simultaneously being the first Romanian artist to do so. "I Can Feel" premiered at Vibe FM, with Ela Rose being the lead vocals that worked for this single, and "So Bizarre" (in collaboration with Dony) was presented for the first time at Radio 21. The "So Bizarre" single reached number 1 in the Romanian Top 100. In 2011, David Deejay released the single "Perfect 2", in which was also featured P Jolie & Nonis. This single peaked at number 26 on the charts, and ended the year at the number 78 spot in the top 100 Romanian End-Year Chart 2011.

== Discography ==
=== Album ===
- Popcorn (2010)

=== Singles ===
Year	Title	Chart Positions			
Year	Title	Romanian Top 100	Bulgarian Top 100	Netherlands Top 40	Netherlands Dance 40
2008	"Sexy Thing" feat Dony	#1	#9	#3	#25
2008	"Nasty Dream" feat Dony	#1	—	—	—
2009	"I Can Feel" feat Ela Rose	#3	—	#2	—
2009	"So Bizarre" feat Dony	#1	—	#8	—
2010	"Temptation" feat Dony	#1	#37	—	—
2010	"Indianotech" feat Mossano	#1	—	—	—
2011	"Perfect 2" feat P Jolie & Nonis	#26	—	—	—

== Awards ==
Year	Title	Section	Nominated for:	Result	Reference
2008	Romanian Music Awards	Best New Act	"Sexy Thing"	Nominated	
2008	Romanian Music Awards	Best Song	"Sexy Thing"	Nominated	
2008	Romanian Music Awards	Best DJ	"Sexy Thing"	Winner	
2009	Romanian Music Awards	Best Dance	"Nasty Dream"	Nominated	
2009	Romanian Music Awards	Best DJ	"Nasty Dream"	Nominated	
2009	Romanian Music Awards	New Sound Creator	"Nasty Dream"	Winner	

== See also ==
- List of music released by Romanian artists that has charted in major music markets
