= Florian Rus =

Romanian singer and songwriter (born 1989)

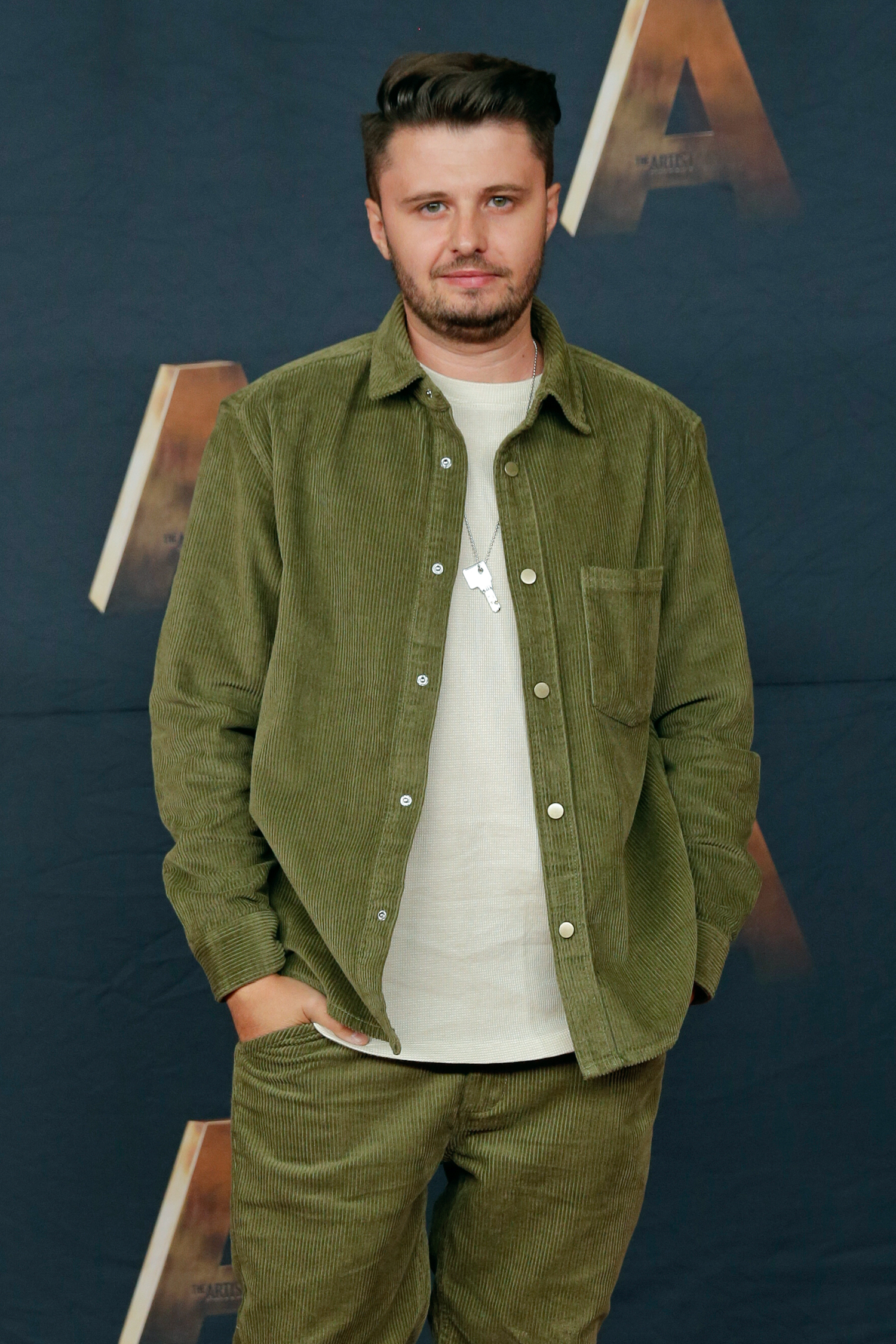
- Florian Rus on the red carpet at The Artist Awards 2021
- Born: Florian Rus; 19 April 1989 (age 37); Târgoviște, Romania
- Occupations: Singer; Songwriter
- Years active: 2014–present
- Musical career
- Genre: Dance-pop • pop • electropop • indie pop
- Labels: Roton; Cat Music; Global

Florian Rus (born April 19, 1989) is a Romanian singer and songwriter. He wrote songs for artists such as AMI, Mira, Andra, Delia, Loredana, Andreea Bălan, Alina Eremia, Lidia Buble and Corina.

== Life and career ==
Florian Rus was born on April 19, 1989, in the city of Târgoviște. The artist is the son of the Romanian folk musician Mircea Rusu.

Florian Rus's debut single was released in early 2014, titled "Cum arată dragostea", and is a collaboration with Alexandra Ungureanu. In the autumn of the same year, he participated in the fourth season of the show Vocea României, broadcast by Pro TV. He was not among the finalists of the show but was noticed by Marius Moga and co-opted to DeMoga Studios as a producer.

On July 1, 2019, Florian Rus together with Mira released the single "Străzile din București". The song climbed to number 1 on the Top Airplay 100 after 54 days of release, where it remained for another 14 weeks. In December 2019, the artist released his first EP, Străzile din București, which contains four tracks.

As a composer and lyricist, Florian Rus' repertoire includes songs such as "Ce zodie ești" (2016) performed by Delia and Marius Moga, "Enigma" (2021) performed by AMI and Tata Vlad or "Dependența mea" (2021) performed by Alina Eremia.

In 2022, the song "Străzile din București" was included on the soundtrack of the television series Ruxx, produced and broadcast by HBO Max. On June 24, 2022, Florian Rus released "Dulce greșeală", the first single from his EP Flacăra mea geamănă, which was released on August 5.

== Discography ==
Florian Rus discography
- EPs: 2
- Singles: 20

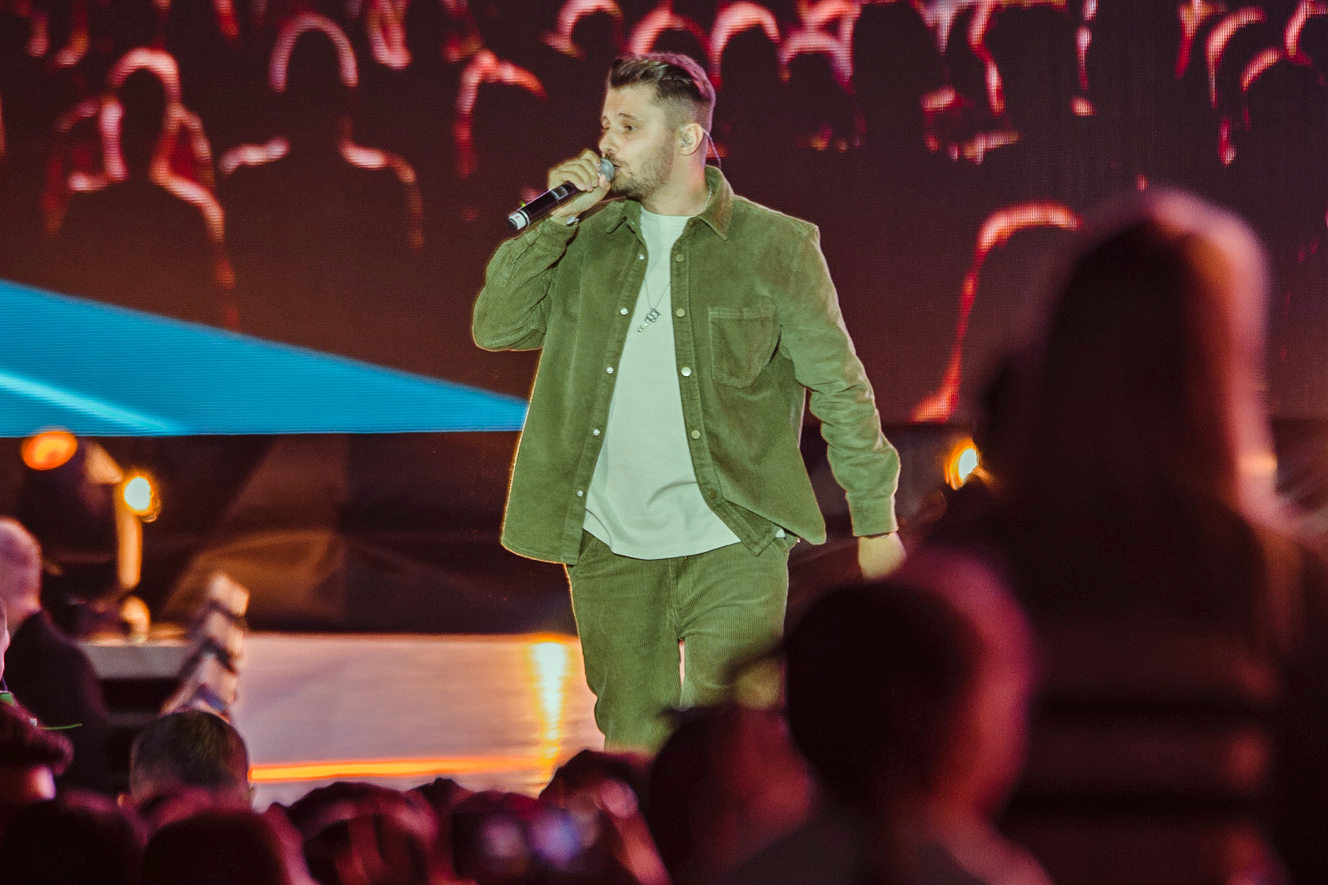
Florian Rus performing at The Artist Awards 2021 on September 19, 2021

=== Albums ===
==== Extended plays ====
Title	Album details
Străzile din București	Released: December 6, 2019; Label: Roton Music; Format: Digital download, EP
Flacăra mea geamănă	Released: August 5, 2022; Label: Global; Format: Digital download, EP

=== Singles ===
==== As lead artist ====
List of singles as lead artist
Title	Year	Peak chart positions	Album
Title	Year	ROU	Album
"Cum arată dragostea" (featuring Alexandra Ungureanu)	2014	—	Non-album singles
"Cât încă ne iubim"	2016	—	Megahits 2017
"Cel mai lung drum"	2017	—	SuperVara 2017
"Străzile din București" (with Mira)	2019	1	Străzile din București
"Take Me Slow" (with Delia Rus)	2019	—	Non-album singles
"Când vine noaptea"	2019	—	Străzile din București
"Pe buzele tale"	2019	—	Străzile din București
"Sportul preferat"	2019	—	Străzile din București
"Singura greșeală" (with Ioana Ignat)	2020	—	Non-album singles
"Cu dorul meu de tine"	2020	—	
"Pură ficțiune"	2021	—	
"Dacă m-ai iubit cândva" (with JO)	2021	—	
"Doar o stare"	2021	—	
"Partea mea de vină"	2022	—	
"Dulce greșeală"	2022	—	Flacăra mea geamănă
"Flacăra mea geamănă"	2022	—	Flacăra mea geamănă
"Sentimente cu alcool"	2022	—	Flacăra mea geamănă
"Fără tine" (with Nicole Cherry)	2022	—	Flacăra mea geamănă
"—" denotes a title that did not chart, or was not released in that territory.

==== As featured artist ====
List of singles as featured artist
Title	Year	Album
"Sunetul meu preferat" (Sore featuring Florian Rus)	2020	Non-album singles
"Regrete" (AMI featuring Florian Rus)	2020	Non-album singles
"Wrong to Let U Go" (Sasha Lopez featuring Florian Rus)	2020	Non-album singles

=== Songwriting credits ===
List of selected songwriting credits
Title	Artist	Year	Peak chart positions	Album
Title	Artist	Year	ROU	Album
"Petrecere de adio"	Piticu featuring Mira	2015	—	Non-album singles
"Inima mea"	Nicoleta Nucă	2016	—	Non-album singles
"Prefer"	Shift featuring Lariss	2016	—	Non-album singles
"Ce zodie ești"	Delia featuring Marius Moga	2016	—	Deliria
"Ziua de azi"	Loredana	2017	—	Non-album singles
"Ocean de vise"	Andra	2017	—	Iubirea schimbă tot
"RuRumba (Jungle Beat)"	Morris with Cabral	2017	—	Non-album singles
"Indiferența"	Andra	2018	—	Non-album singles
"Hey, Cowboy!"	Diana Brescan featuring Dorian Popa	2018	—	Non-album singles
"De câte x vrei tu"	Amna	2018	—	Non-album singles
"Adio"	Cleopatra Stratan	2019	—	Non-album singles
"Shadows"	Monoir featuring Brianna	2019	—	Non-album singles
"Cum de te lasă"	Mira	2019	—	Non-album singles
"Asta sunt eu"	Lidia Buble featuring What's UP	2019	—	Non-album singles
"J'ai besoin de toi"	Mark Azekko with Eneli and Tobi Ibitoye	2019	—	Non-album singles
"Cum să mă las"	Sore	2019	—	Non-album singles
"Atât de fain" (The Session)	AMI	2019	—	Non-album singles
"De ce?"	Mira	2020	—	Divina
"Fotografii"	AMI	2020	—	Non-album singles
"Bad Days"	Eneli	2020	—	Non-album singles
"O privire"	Mira	2020	—	Divina
"Spune-mi"	Roxen	2020	—	Non-album singles
"Furtuna mea"	Ilinca	2020	—	Non-album singles
"Învață-mă"	Mira	2020	—	Divina
"Lasă-mă"	Mark Stam	2020	—	Non-album singles
"La răsărit"	Wrs	2020	—	Non-album singles
"Înger păzitor"	Andreea Bălan	2020	—	Non-album singles
"Lasă-mă să-i spun"	Sore featuring Tudor	2020	—	Non-album singles
"Un minut"	Tudor Bilețchi	2020	—	Non-album singles
"Dacă nu dansezi tu"	Shift	2020	—	Fragil
"Cineva"	Mira	2020	—	Divina
"Să fii fericit"	Alina Eremia	2020	—	Non-album singles
"Cadoul meu preferat"	Milan Gavris with Robert Zahiu	2020	—	Non-album singles
"Fluturii"	Liviu Teodorescu featuring JO	2021	—	Non-album singles
"City of Love"	Norya	2021		Non-album singles
"Dependența mea"	Alina Eremia	2021	—	Déjà Vu
"Enigma"	AMI featuring Tata Vlad	2021	3	Non-album singles
"Bipolară"	Alina Eremia	2021	—	Déjà Vu
"Zi Merci"	Mira	2021	—	Divina
"Indigo"	Sonja	2021	—	Non-album singles
"Gândurile mele"	Alina Eremia	2021	—	Déjà Vu
"Târziu"	Nalani	2021	—	Non-album singles
"Mon Ami (RaTaTa)"	Serena with Andrei Bănuță	2021	—	Non-album singles
"Gloanțe"	Emil Rengle with Emaa and Bruja	2021	—	Non-album singles
"Red Blue"	Misha Miller	2021	—	Non-album singles
"Pe limba ta"	Andrei Bănuță with Nosfe	2022	—	Non-album singles
"Plouă"	Holy Molly with Tata Vlad	2022	—	Non-album singles
"Ai ales"	Corina	2022	—	Non-album singles
"După apus"	Iuliana Beregoi	2022	—	Non-album singles
"Ce-ar spune sufletul"	Alina Eremia	2022	—	Non-album singles
"O secundă"	Julian with OTS	2022	—	Non-album singles
"Ultima dată"	Emaa	2022	—	Non-album singles
"Foc la inimă"	Corina	2022	—	Non-album singles
"Uită-mă"	Rareș with OTS	2022	—	Non-album singles
"—" denotes a title that did not chart, or was not released in that territory.

== Filmography ==
Year	Title	Role	Credit	Ref.
2020	Ruxx	—	Original Soundtrack	

== Television ==
Year	Title	Role	Note
2014	Vocea României	Himself as a contestant	TV show broadcast by Pro TV
