= Marnik =

Italian progressive house music duo

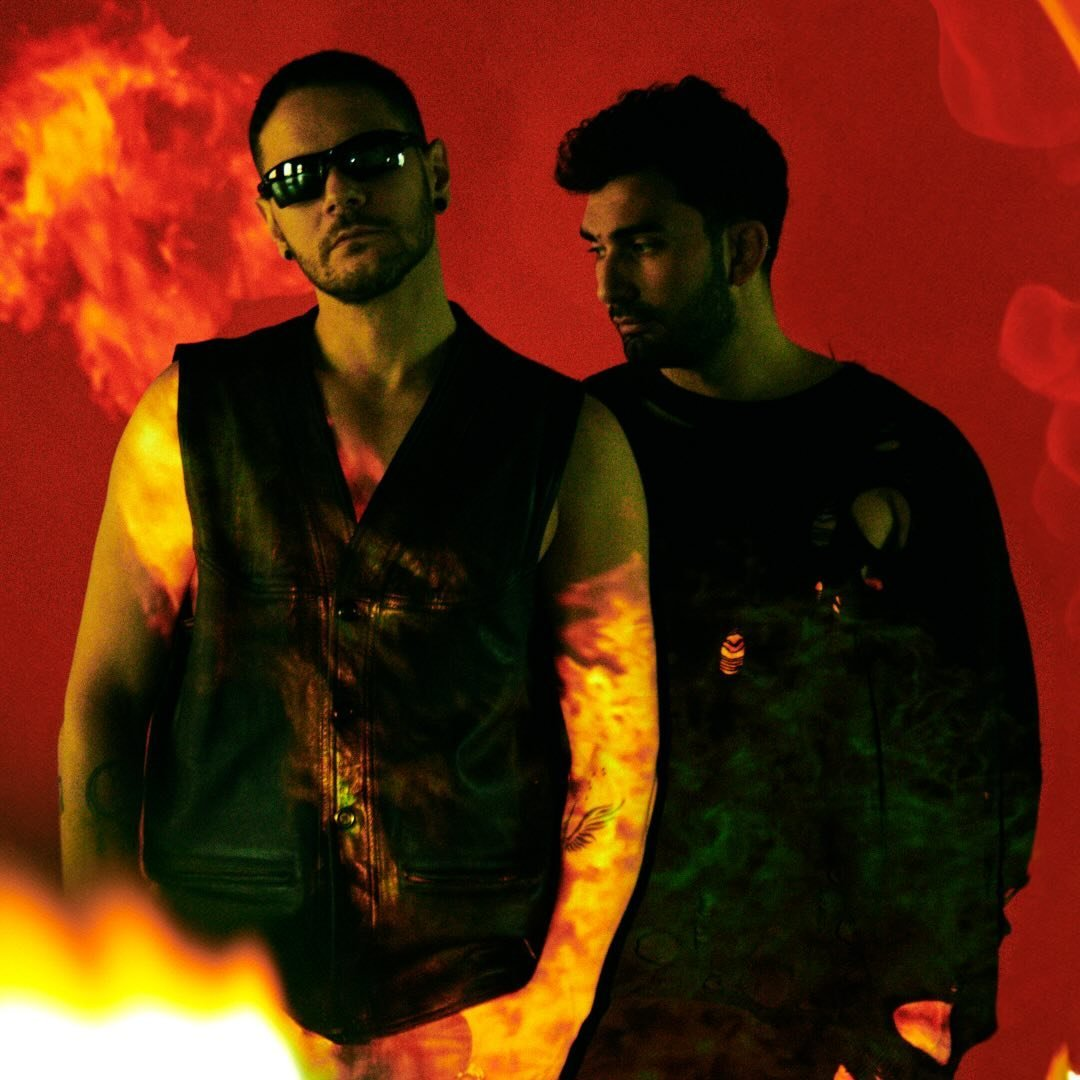
- Marnik in 2025

Background information
- Origin: Italy
- Genres: Hard Dance, Trance, Neo Rave, Techno, EDM
- Years active: 2014-present
- Label: Arena Records
- Members: Alessandro Martello; Emanuele Longo

MARNIK is an Italian electronic dance music duo formed in 2013 by Alessandro Martello and Emanuele Longo. Known for their fusion of trance-inspired melodies and festival-ready drops, the duo has released music on major labels including Spinnin’ Records, Revealed Recordings, Dim Mak, and has performed at leading electronic music festivals such as Tomorrowland, Creamfields, and Sunburn Festival. Their tracks have collectively amassed over 1 billion streams, and in 2024 they entered DJ Mag’s Top 100 DJs list, reaching position #90.

== Career ==
=== Early career ===
Both members grew up influenced by the 1990s electronic music scene, particularly eurodance, breakbeat, trance, and techno. As teenagers in Milan, they began DJing in local clubs and released their first tracks individually under solo pseudonyms through trance and progressive house labels such as Kontor Records and Enhanced Music.

The duo’s formation dates back to 2013, during the rise of the EDM boom. Working together in a basement studio in Milan, they experimented with blending trance elements with big-room house. Their first joint single, Momentum, was signed to Hardwell’s Revealed Recordings and premiered at Ultra Music Festival 2014, before its release later that year. The project name MARNIK combines part of Martello’s surname (Mar-) with Longo’s nickname (-nik).

=== Breakthrough ===
Following Momentum, Marnik gained visibility with singles such as Gladiators and Hocus Pocus. Their collaboration with KSHMR, Bazaar (2015, Spinnin’ Records), became one of the defining tracks of the mid-2010s EDM era, praised for its epic, trance-influenced melodies and energetic drops. The success of these records led to extensive touring across Europe and Asia, with performances at Ushuaïa Ibiza, Amnesia Ibiza, Ministry of Sound London, and Story Miami.

=== Transition to dance-pop and streaming success (2018–2020) ===
After several years of touring, Emanuele Longo chose to step back from live performances to focus on studio production, while Alessandro Martello continued touring internationally under the MARNIK banner. During this period, coinciding with the rise of streaming platforms and the COVID-19 pandemic, the duo shifted towards more accessible dance-pop records.

Notable releases include:

- Gam Gam (2018) – certified Gold in France and Poland
- Up & Down (2019) – certified Double Platinum in Poland
- Butterfly (2020) – certified Gold rca

=== Rave/Techno sound and global hits (2021–2024) ===
Post-pandemic, MARNIK evolved their style towards a techno and rave-inspired sound. In 2023, they released Boyz in Paris, a rework of the Jay-Z and Kanye West classic, which became their biggest success to date. The track surpassed 300 million streams on Spotify and achieved multiple Gold and Platinum certifications across Europe.

In 2024, the duo released further rave-oriented singles such as "Home Alone" and "Ameno", and performed at Creamfields UK and Tomorrowland Brazil for the first time. Later that year, MARNIK entered DJ Mag’s Top 100 DJs at position #90, marking one of the biggest jumps of the year.

=== Arena Records and recent activity (2025–present) ===
In 2025, MARNIK launched their own label, Arena Records, in partnership with Universal Germany. Alongside the label, the duo introduced a new “epic-rave” concept combining music with visual themes inspired by ancient civilizations and lost worlds. That same year, they re-entered DJ Mag’s Top 100 DJs, climbing higher than their debut ranking.

== Discography ==
=== Singles ===
Year	Title	Peak chart positions				Certifications
Year	Title	FRA	BEL Fla	BEL Wal	POL	Certifications
2015	"Bazaar (Official Sunburn Goa 2015 Anthem)" (Kshmr and Marnik)	—	—	Tip	—	
2016	"Supernova (Interstellar)" (Steve Aoki, Marnik and Lil Jon)	—	—	—	—	
2016	"Mandala (Sunburn 2016 Anthem)" (Kshmr and Marnik featuring Mitika)	—	—	Tip	—	
2017	"Children of a Miracle" (Don Diablo and Marnik)	—	—	Tip:41	—	
2017	"King In the North" (Blazars and Marnik)	—	—	—	—	
2017	"Burn" (feat. ROOKIES)	—	—	—	—	
2017	"Shiva" (Kshmr & Marnik feat. The Golden Army)	—	—	—	—	
2018	"Bella Ciao" (Steve Aoki and Marnik)	—	—	—	—	
2018	"Gam Gam" (Marnik and Smack)	71	Tip:27	36	23	ZPAV: Gold
2019	"Up & Down"	—	—	Tip	27	ZPAV: Gold
2019	"Alone" (Marnik and Kshmr featuring Anjulie and Jeffrey Jey)	—	—	—	4	ZPAV: 2× Platinum
2020	"Made of Stars" (featuring PollyAnna)	—	—	—	13	
2020	"Butterfly" (Marnik and Hard Lights)	—	—	—	—	
2020	"Dalida" (Marnik and Shanguy)	—	—	—	—	
2021	"Candyman" (R3hab and Marnik)	—	—	—	—	
2021	"One More Dance" (Gigi D'Agostino, Marnik and Luca Noise)	—	—	—	—	
2022	"On The Run"	—	—	—	—	
2022	"Stop The World (Steve Aoki, Marnik and Leony)	—	—	—	—	
2022	"Across The Sun" (Marnik, Orange INC and Vanessa Camapgne)	—	—	—	—	
2022	"Turn The Page" (Marnik and Lordnox)	—	—	—	—	
2022	"Love Is The Answer" (Skar Manfree and Marnik)	—	—	—	—	
2022	"Raindrop" (Marnik, Harris & Ford and Shibui)	—	—	—	—	
2023	"Boyz in Paris" (Marnik, Naeleck & Vinai)	57	—	—	—	ZPAV: Gold
"—" denotes a recording that did not chart or was not released in that country.
