= Shanguy =

French-Italian music collective project

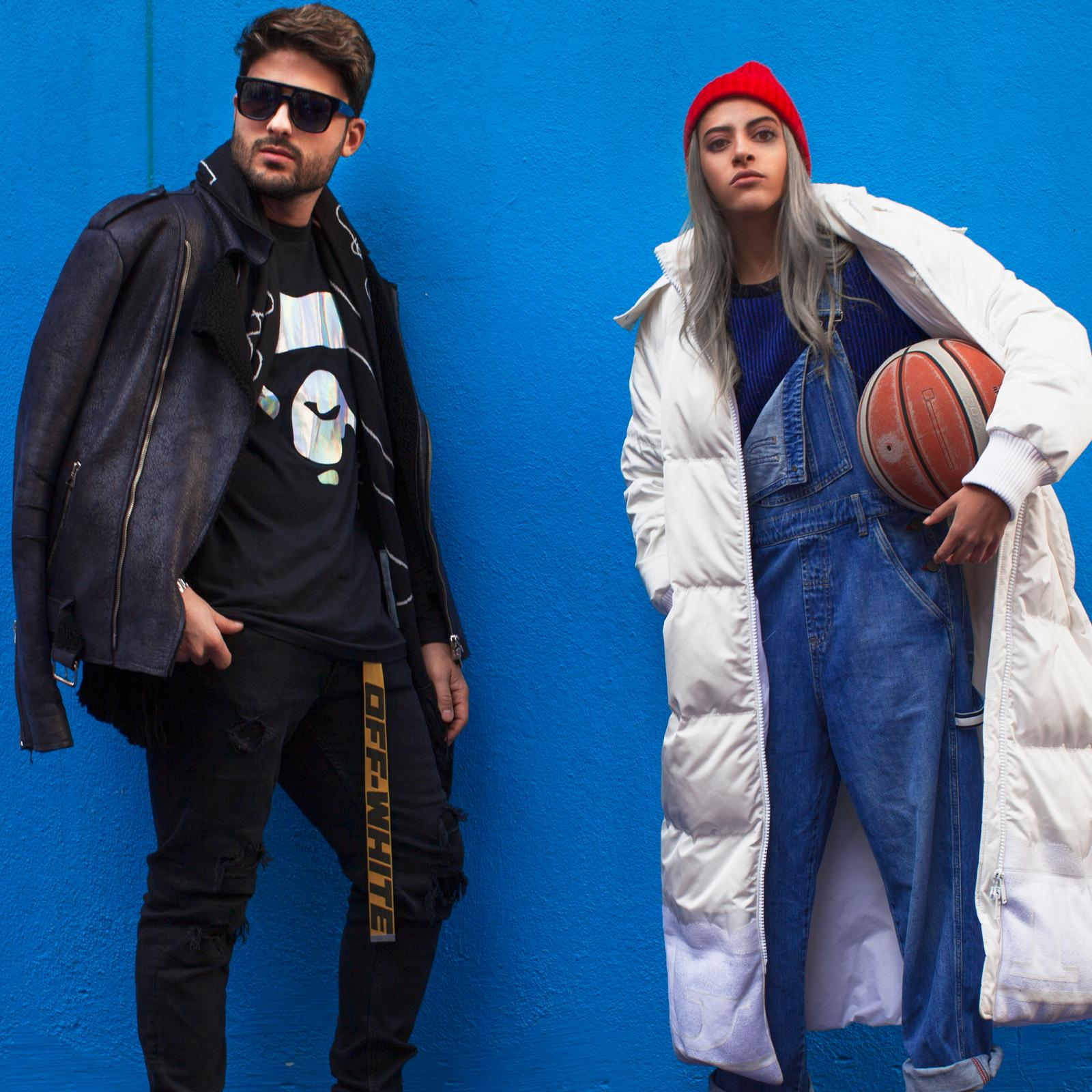
- Shanguy in Paris (2020)

Background information
- Origin: France; Italy
- Genres: Pop; Dance-pop; Electronic; Indie folk; Reggae; House
- Instruments: DJ; Vocals
- Years active: 2017 – present
- Labels: Magic Records; Ego Italy
- Members: NRD1; Shady Cherkaoui
- Past members: Eon Melka; Frank-O

Shanguy is a French-Italian music collective project founded in 2017.

== Discography ==
=== Singles ===
Year	Title	Peak positions					Certifications	Album
Year	Title	POL (AirPlay)	POL (AirPlay nowości)	POL (airplayTV)	CIS	FRA	Certifications	Album
2017	"La Louze"	1	1	1	9	60	POL: Platinum	TBA
2018	"King Of The Jungle"	1	2	2	15	–	POL: Platinum	TBA
2019	"Toukassé"	2	3	–	30	–		TBA
2019	"Désolée (Paris/Paname)"	1	1	1	76	–	POL: Double platinum	TBA
2020	"Back To Life"	2	4	2	–	–		TBA
2020	"Dalida" (Shanguy & Marnik)	–	–	–	–	–		TBA
2021	"Kalima Minou"	1	3	5	–	–		
