= Emaa =

Romanian singer and songwriter

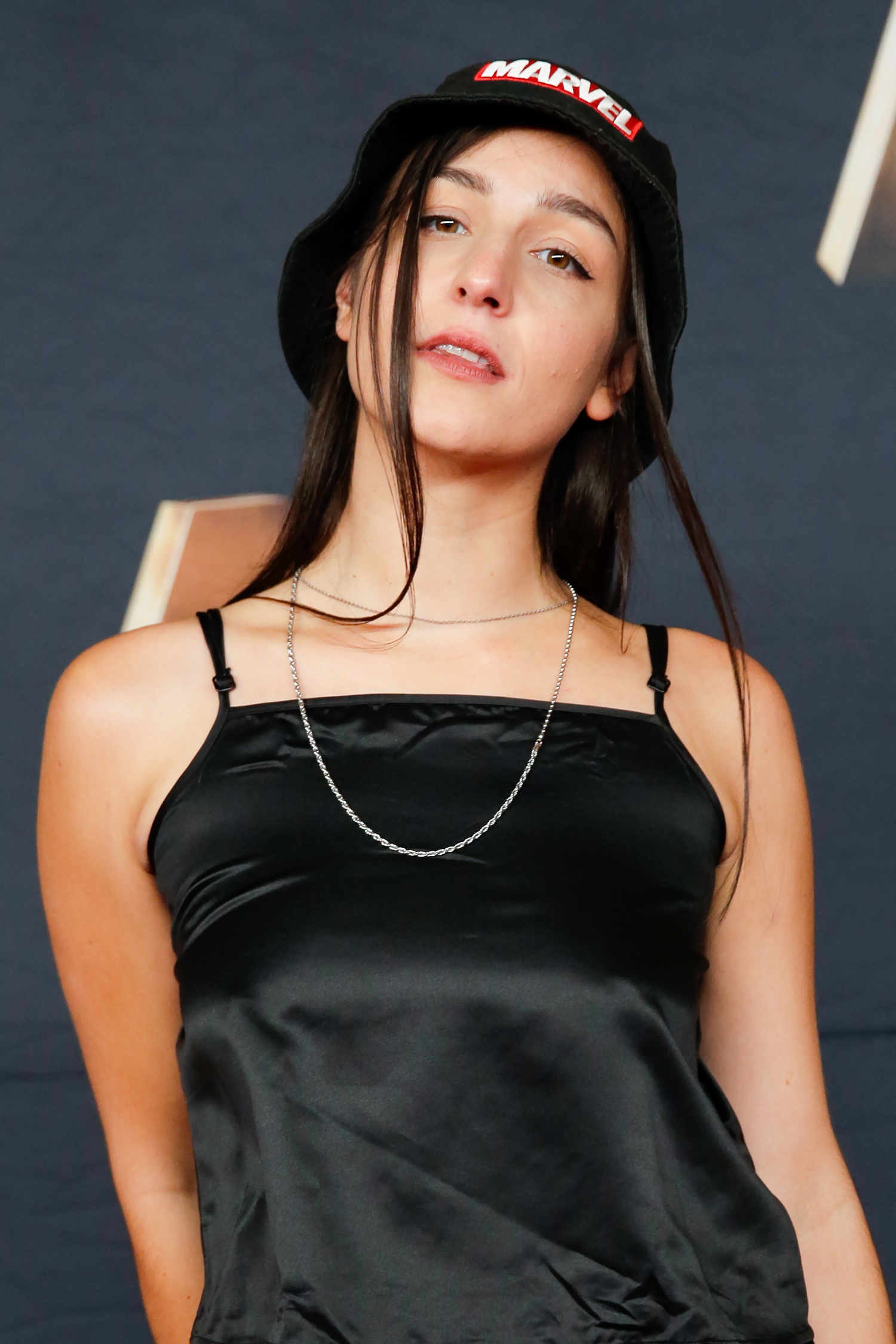
- Emaa on the red carpet at The Artist Awards 2021

Background information
- Also known as: EM44; EM
- Born: Emanuela Alexa; 2 April 1992 (age 34); Lugoj, Romania
- Occupations: Singer; Songwriter
- Years active: 2015–present
- Musical career
- Genres: Alternative pop
- Instrument: Vocals
- Label: Global

Emanuela Alexa (born April 2, 1992), known professionally as Emaa (stylized in all caps), is a Romanian singer and songwriter. She became known in 2020 after the release of the song "Insula", in collaboration with The Motans, which brought her collaboration with Global Records.

== Life and career ==
Emanuela Alexa was born on April 2, 1992, in Lugoj, Romania. Emaa started singing as a child, being encouraged by her mother and grandparents. At the age of three, she participated in Tip Top MiniTop, a televised children's talent contest. She finished high school in her hometown and moved to Timișoara, where she studied at the Faculty of Sociology and Psychology at West University.

After graduating from college, Emaa started playing with the alternative rock band BAB from Timişoara as a composer and vocal soloist. In 2015, she began a long-term collaboration with Silent Strike and released her first single, "Mâine", with Deliric.

In 2017, Emaa was the female voice in the tracks on the album released by Silent Strike and entitled It`s Not Safe To Turn Off Your Computer.

In 2018, she worked with Silent Strike, Deliric, Seek Music and Paul Parker on the soundtrack for the HBO-based Hackerville television series.

In 2020, after signing with Global Records, she had a collaboration with Sickotoy for the song "Gasolina".

In October 2020, The Motans and Emaa released the song "Insula". On December 1, 2020, the artist released her first studio album, Macii înfloresc iarna, which contains four songs performed by Emaa and three collaborations with Bastien, Bruja and Killa Fonic.

== Discography ==
=== Studio albums ===
Title	Details
Macii înfloresc iarna	Released: December 1, 2020; Label: Global Records; Format: CD
fratele abis	Released: April 17, 2024; Label: Global Records; Format: CD

=== Singles ===
==== As lead artist ====
List of singles as lead artist
Title	Year	Peak chart positions	Album
Title	Year	ROU	Album
"The City (City light)"	2019	—	Non-album singles
"Ego The Friend" (Live Acoustic Session)	2019	—	Non-album singles
"The Movie"	2019	—	Non-album singles
"Fun"	2020	—	Non-album singles
"Macii înfloresc iarna"	2020	—	Macii înfloresc iarna
"Zboară"	2020	—	Macii înfloresc iarna
"Extaz murdar" (feat. Killa Fonic)	2020	—	Macii înfloresc iarna
"Kundalini" (feat. Bruja)	2020	—	Macii înfloresc iarna
"Copilul"	2020	—	Macii înfloresc iarna
"Nebună"	2020	—	Macii înfloresc iarna
"Luna și stelele" (feat. Bastien)	2020	—	Macii înfloresc iarna
"Zburătorul"	2021	4	Non-album single
"Sufletu' imun"	2021	—	Non-album single
"Atât de noi"	2021	—	Non-album single
"—" denotes a recording that did not chart or was not released in that territory.

==== As featured artist ====
List of singles as featured artist
Title	Year	Peak chart positions		Album
Title	Year	ROU	CIS	Album
"Mâine" (Deliric feat. Silent Strike & Emaa)	2016	—	—	Deliric X Silent Strike
"It`s Not Safe To Turn Off Your Computer" (Silent Strike feat. Emaa)	2017	—	—	It's Not Safe to Turn off Your Computer
"The Edge" (Silent Strike feat. Emaa)	2017	—	—	It's Not Safe to Turn off Your Computer
"Melancholia" (Silent Strike feat. Emaa)	2017	—	—	It's Not Safe to Turn off Your Computer
"Synopsis" (Silent Strike feat. Emaa)	2017	—	—	It's Not Safe to Turn off Your Computer
"Under Skies" (Silent Strike feat. Emaa)	2017	—	—	It's Not Safe to Turn off Your Computer
"Under Skins" (Silent Strike feat. Emaa)	2017	—	—	It's Not Safe to Turn off Your Computer
"Invaders" (Silent Strike feat. Emaa)	2018	—	—	Hackerville (Original TV Soundtrack)
"Control" (Silent Strike feat. Emaa)	2019	—	—	Non-album single
"Sinsanity" (Silent Strike feat. Emaa)	2019	—	—	Qb Sessions, Vol. 1
"Azi" (Deliric feat. Silent Strike & Emaa)	2019	—	—	Deliric X Silent Strike II
"Gasolina" (Sickotoy feat. Emaa)	2020	10	—	Non-album single
"Insula" (The Motans feat. Emaa)	2020	1	—	Non-album single
"Extaz murdar" (Killa Fonic feat. Emaa)	2020	—	—	Non-album single
"Curaj Lichid" (Taman Amu feat. Emaa)	2021	—	—	Non-album single
"Pură ficțiune, Zburătorul | Piano Session" (Florian Rus feat. Emaa)	2021	—	—	Non-album single
"Gloanțe" (Rengle feat. Emaa & Bruja)	2021	—	—	Non-album single
"N-aud" (Carla's Dreams feat. Emaa)	2021	1	137	Non-album single
"Armada" (Killa Fonic feat. Emaa)	2021	—	—	Terra Vista
"La timpul lor" (DJ Project feat. Emaa)	2022	—	—	Non-album single
"—" denotes a recording that did not chart or was not released in that territory.

== Awards and nominations ==
Year	Award	Category	Nominee / Work	Result	Ref.
2019	Grimme-Preis	Grimme Preis for Film Music	Hackerville OST (Silent Strike feat. Emaa, Deliric, Seek Music & Paul Parker)	Won	
2019	Berlin Music Video Awards	Best Editor	"Control" (Silent Strike feat. Emaa)	Nominated	

== Filmography ==
Year	Title	Role	Credit	Ref.
2018	Hackerville	—	Original TV Soundtrack	
2020	Bani negri (pentru zile albe)	—	Original TV Soundtrack	
