= Hackerville =

2018 television series

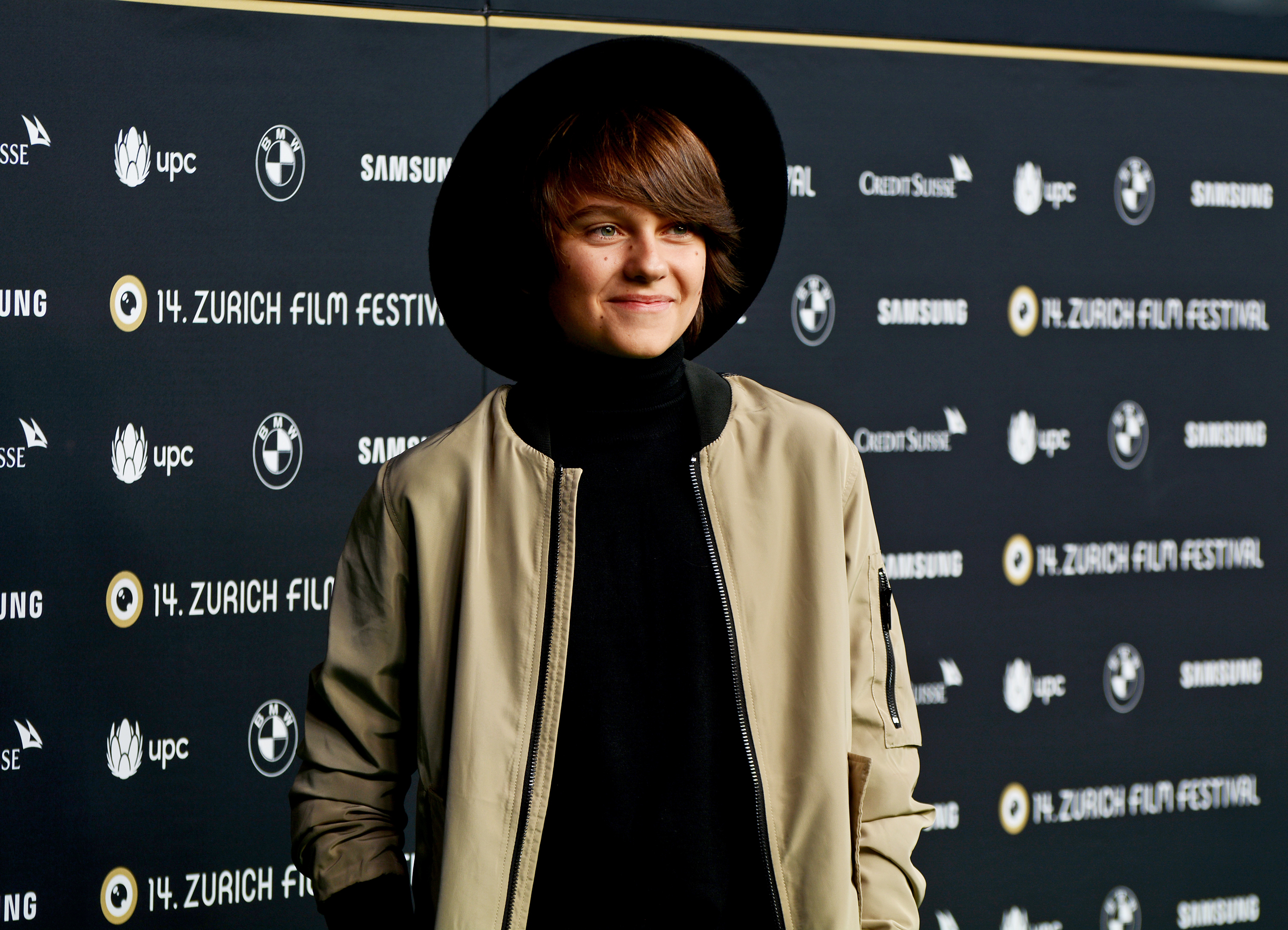
Actor Voicu Dumitras attends the Hackerville photo call during the 14th Zurich Film Festival on September 28, 2018 in Switzerland.

Hackerville is an international co-produced Romanian and German language television drama series consisting of six episodes, which aired on HBO Europe and German TNT Serie channel in November–December 2018.

== Cast ==
- Anna Schumacher
- Andi Vasluianu
- Voicu Dumitras

== Episodes ==
No.	Title	Directed by	Written by	Original release date
1	"Drei Neunen"	Igor Cobileanski	Unknown	November 4, 2018
2	"Rot gewinnt"	Igor Cobileanski	Unknown	November 4, 2018
3	"Der talentierte Mr. Cipi"	Anca Miruna Lazarescu	Unknown	November 11, 2018
4	"Divide et Impera"	Anca Miruna Lazarescu	Unknown	November 18, 2018
5	"Offline"	Igor Cobileanski	Unknown	November 25, 2018
6	"Wollen wir spielen?"	Igor Cobileanski	Unknown	December 2, 2018
