= Andia (singer) =

Romanian singer (born 1997)

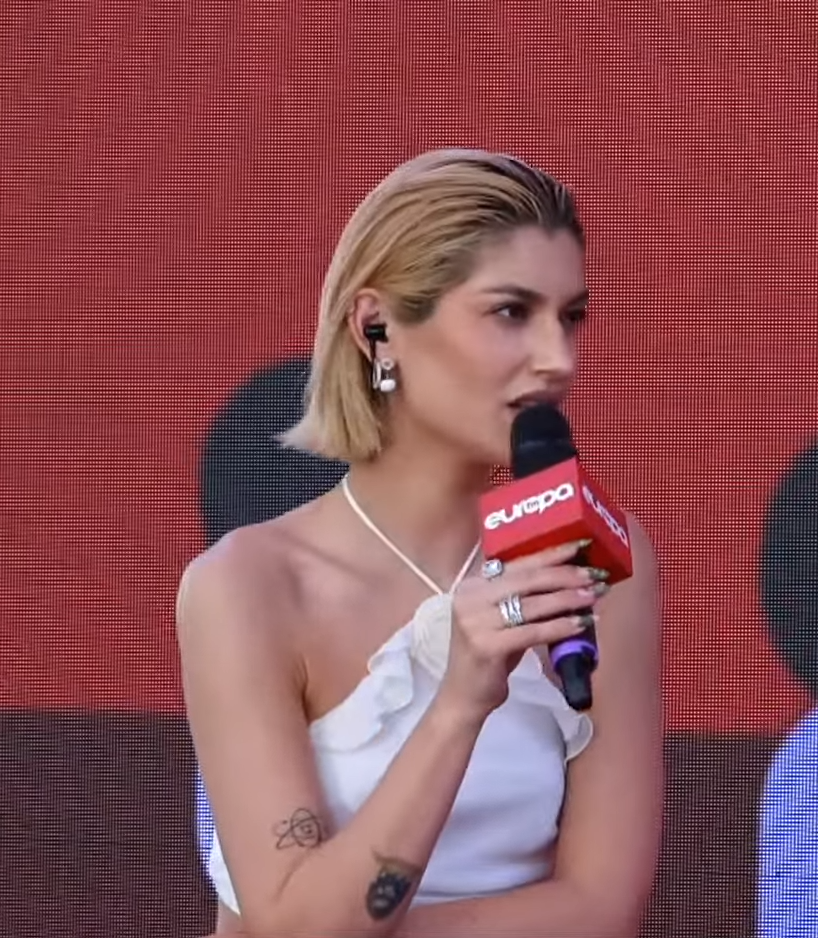

Background information
- Born: Diana Constantin; 2 June 1997 (age 28); Roman, Romania
- Occupation: Singer
- Instrument: Vocals
- Years active: 2015–present
- Labels: Cat Music; Voices Media; Atom

Diana Constantin (born 2 June 1997), better known as simply Andia, is a Romanian singer. In 2019, she became the soloist of the band DJ Project. At the Romanian Music Awards 2022, she won the "Best Pop Song" award for the song "Sfârșitul lumii".

== Musical career ==
Sfarsitul lumii (2021), taken from Andia's debut studio album Pietre prețioase (2022), topped the Romanian Top 100 and was awarded a Romanian Music Award. La nevedere, released in November 2022, marked her first number one on Billboard's Romania Songs, being the most consumed song nationwide according to Luminate Data for three consecutive weeks, as well as her first entry into the Moldovan top ten.

Inseparabili (2023), in collaboration with 3 Sud Est, also reached the top of the Uniunea Producătorilor de Fonograme din România hit parade. Pentru ca (2023), a duet with Deliric, stopped at the podium of the Moldovan chart.

== Discography ==
=== Singles ===
- 2015: Sabes Tu
- 2016: Lost
- 2018: Tu Regalo (Andia x Erika)
- 2018: Somebody To Love (Jon Brian x UnderVibe x Andia)
- 2018: Dumb, Dumb (Wendell x Andia)
- 2018: Fake Walls (Andia x UPHILLS)
- 2019: Meo Beijou
- 2019: Hello, Hello
- 2019: Salcâmii (Spike x Andia)
- 2019: Retrograd (DJ Project x Andia)
- 2020: Ce suntem noi
- 2020: Slăbiciuni (DJ Project x Andia)
- 2020: Anotimpuri (Andia x Spike)
- 2021: Mi-e dor
- 2021: Sfârșitul lumii
- 2021: Universul
- 2022: Pietre prețioase (Andia x Guess Who)
- 2022: Alerg
- 2022: Aer
- 2022: Liberi
- 2022: Ce urmează
- 2022: La nevedere
- 2023: Intenționat
- 2023: Scrie-mi orice
- 2023: Inseparabili (3 Sud Est x Andia)
- 2023: Pentru că (Andia x Deliric)
- 2023: Nemuritori
- 2023: Egotic
- 2023: Solstițiu
- 2024: De la Dela
- 2024: Soarele (Spike x Andia)
- 2024: Inimi
