= Alexia Aștelian =

Romanian singer

Alexia Aștelian (born 27 May 2003 in Mureș County, Romania), known by the stage name Alexia, is a Romanian singer. She is best known for, among others, the hit "Interstelar", which topped the UPFR charts for three weeks in July-August 2023. In February 2016, at the age of 12, she participated in the sixth season of Romanian reality competition television series Next Star.

== Discography ==
=== Singles ===
Titles	Year	Positions
Titles	Year	(Romania) ROU
"Cronic" (feat. DJ Project)	2020	
"Pentru Tine"	2020	
"Gemeni și Balanță"	2021	
"Monocrom"	2022	
"Pe dos"	2022	
"Interstelar"	2023	1
"Infinituri" (feat. Spike)	2023	
"Ultimul Apus"	2023	
"Timizi"	2023	
"De dragul tau"	2023	
"Peste mari"	2024	
"Dans Nocturn"	2024	
"Plouă cu Șervețele"	2024	
