= Infinity (Jaymes Young song) =

- Piano version cover

Single by Jaymes Young

from the album Feel Something
- Released: June 23, 2017
- Genre: Electronic rock
- Length: 3:57
- Label: Atlantic
- Songwriters: Mathieu Jomphe-Lepined; Jaymes Young
- Producers: Billboard; Jaymes Young

Jaymes Young singles chronology
"We Won't" (2015)	"Infinity" (2017)	"Happiest Year" (2019)

"Infinity" is a song by American singer-songwriter Jaymes Young, released as a single on June 23, 2017, from his debut studio album Feel Something. In 2021, the song went viral on TikTok, where it has appeared in 4.1 million videos so far.

== Content ==
"Infinity" was released in 2017, and included in Young's debut album Feel Something. In 2021, it went viral on video sharing app TikTok, and used for fan edits of the Japanese anime series SK8 the Infinity the same year. The song is written in the key of B minor, with a tempo of 122 beats per minute.

== Credits and personnel ==
Credits adapted from AllMusic.

- Billboard – associate producer, composer
- Emerson Mancini – mastering engineer
- Jaymes Young – associate producer, composer, drums, guitar, keyboards, mixing engineer, primary artist, vocals

== Charts ==
=== Weekly charts ===
Weekly chart performance for "Infinity"
Chart (2017–2024)	Peak position
Australia (ARIA)	46
Austria (Ö3 Austria Top 40)	17
Belarus Airplay (TopHit)	48
Belarus Airplay (TopHit) Pretty Young Remix	16
Canada Hot 100 (Billboard)	52
CIS Airplay (TopHit)	30
CIS Airplay (TopHit) Pretty Young Remix	8
Czech Republic Airplay (ČNS IFPI)	2
Czech Republic Singles Digital (ČNS IFPI)	25
Estonia Airplay (TopHit) Pretty Young Remix	143
Finland (Suomen virallinen lista)	6
France (SNEP)	19
Germany (GfK)	11
Germany Airplay (BVMI)	1
Global 200 (Billboard)	23
Greece International (IFPI)	19
Hungary (Single Top 40)	26
Hungary (Stream Top 40)	37
India International (IMI)	5
Ireland (IRMA)	24
Italy (FIMI)	44
Kazakhstan Airplay (TopHit) Pretty Young Remix	53
Lithuania (AGATA)	14
Lithuania Airplay (TopHit)	166
Lithuania Airplay (TopHit) Pretty Young Remix	172
Luxembourg (Billboard)	5
Mexico Airplay (Billboard)	30
Moldova Airplay (TopHit)	29
Netherlands (Single Top 100)	49
Norway (VG-lista)	17
Poland (Polish Airplay Top 100)	4
Portugal (AFP)	16
Romania (UPFR)	1
Russia Airplay (TopHit)	61
Russia Airplay (TopHit) Pretty Young Remix	5
Singapore (RIAS)	16
Slovakia Airplay (ČNS IFPI)	6
Slovakia Singles Digital (ČNS IFPI)	21
South Africa (RISA)	100
Sweden (Sverigetopplistan)	46
Switzerland (Schweizer Hitparade)	9
Ukraine Airplay (TopHit)	10
Ukraine Airplay (TopHit) Pretty Young Remix	79
UK Singles (OCC)	47
US Billboard Hot 100	94
US Adult Pop Airplay (Billboard)	24
US Hot Rock & Alternative Songs (Billboard)	9
Vietnam (Vietnam Hot 100)	79

=== Monthly charts ===
Monthly chart performance for "Infinity"
Chart (2022–2024)	Peak position
Belarus Airplay (TopHit)	65
Belarus Airplay (TopHit) Pretty Young Remix	21
CIS Airplay (TopHit)	34
CIS Airplay (TopHit) Pretty Young Remix	11
Czech Republic (Rádio Top 100)	6
Czech Republic (Singles Digitál Top 100)	25
Kazakhstan Airplay (TopHit) Pretty Young Remix	77
Moldova Airplay (TopHit)	38
Romania Airplay (TopHit)	78
Russia Airplay (TopHit)	67
Russia Airplay (TopHit) Pretty Young Remix	8
Slovakia (Rádio Top 100)	6
Slovakia (Singles Digitál Top 100)	24
Ukraine Airplay (TopHit)	12
Ukraine Airplay (TopHit) Pretty Young Remix	86

=== Year-end charts ===
2022 year-end chart performance for "Infinity"
Chart (2022)	Position
Austria (Ö3 Austria Top 40)	30
CIS Airplay (TopHit)	72
CIS Airplay (TopHit) Pretty Young Remix	17
Germany (Official German Charts)	27
Global 200 (Billboard)	84
Lithuania (AGATA)	60
Poland (ZPAV)	11
Russia Airplay (TopHit) Pretty Young Remix	21
Switzerland (Schweizer Hitparade)	25
Ukraine Airplay (TopHit)	87
Ukraine Airplay (TopHit) Pretty Young Remix	164
US Hot Rock & Alternative Songs (Billboard)	21

2023 year-end chart performance for "Infinity"
Chart (2023)	Position
Belarus Airplay (TopHit) Pretty Young Remix	73
CIS Airplay (TopHit) Pretty Young Remix	142
Moldova Airplay (TopHit)	105
Romania Airplay (TopHit)	142
Russia Airplay (TopHit)	188
Ukraine Airplay (TopHit)	46

2024 year-end chart performance for "Infinity"
Chart (2024)	Position
Belarus Airplay (TopHit)	97
Belarus Airplay (TopHit) Pretty Young Remix	116

2025 year-end chart performance for "Infinity"
Chart (2025)	Position
Belarus Airplay (TopHit)	159
Belarus Airplay (TopHit) Pretty Young Remix	196

== Certifications ==
Certifications for "Infinity"
Region	Certification	Certified units/sales
Australia (ARIA)	Gold	35,000^{‡}
Austria (IFPI Austria)	Platinum	30,000^{‡}
Brazil (Pro-Música Brasil)	2× Platinum	120,000^{‡}
Denmark (IFPI Danmark)	Gold	45,000^{‡}
France (SNEP)	Diamond	333,333^{‡}
Germany (BVMI)	Gold	200,000^{‡}
Italy (FIMI)	Platinum	100,000^{‡}
New Zealand (RMNZ)	Platinum	30,000^{‡}
Poland (ZPAV)	Diamond	250,000^{‡}
Portugal (AFP)	2× Platinum	20,000^{‡}
Spain (Promusicae)	Platinum	60,000^{‡}
United Kingdom (BPI)	Gold	400,000^{‡}
United States (RIAA)	Platinum	1,000,000^{‡}
^{‡} Sales+streaming figures based on certification alone.

== Release history ==
Release history for "Infinity"
Region	Date	Format	Label	Ref.
Various	June 23, 2017	Digital download; streaming	Atlantic	
Russia	December 13, 2021	Contemporary hit radio	Atlantic	
Italy	December 15, 2021	Contemporary hit radio	Warner	
United States	January 17, 2022	Adult contemporary radio	Atlantic; EMG	
