= Holy Molly =

Romanian singer, songwriter and musician (born 1996)

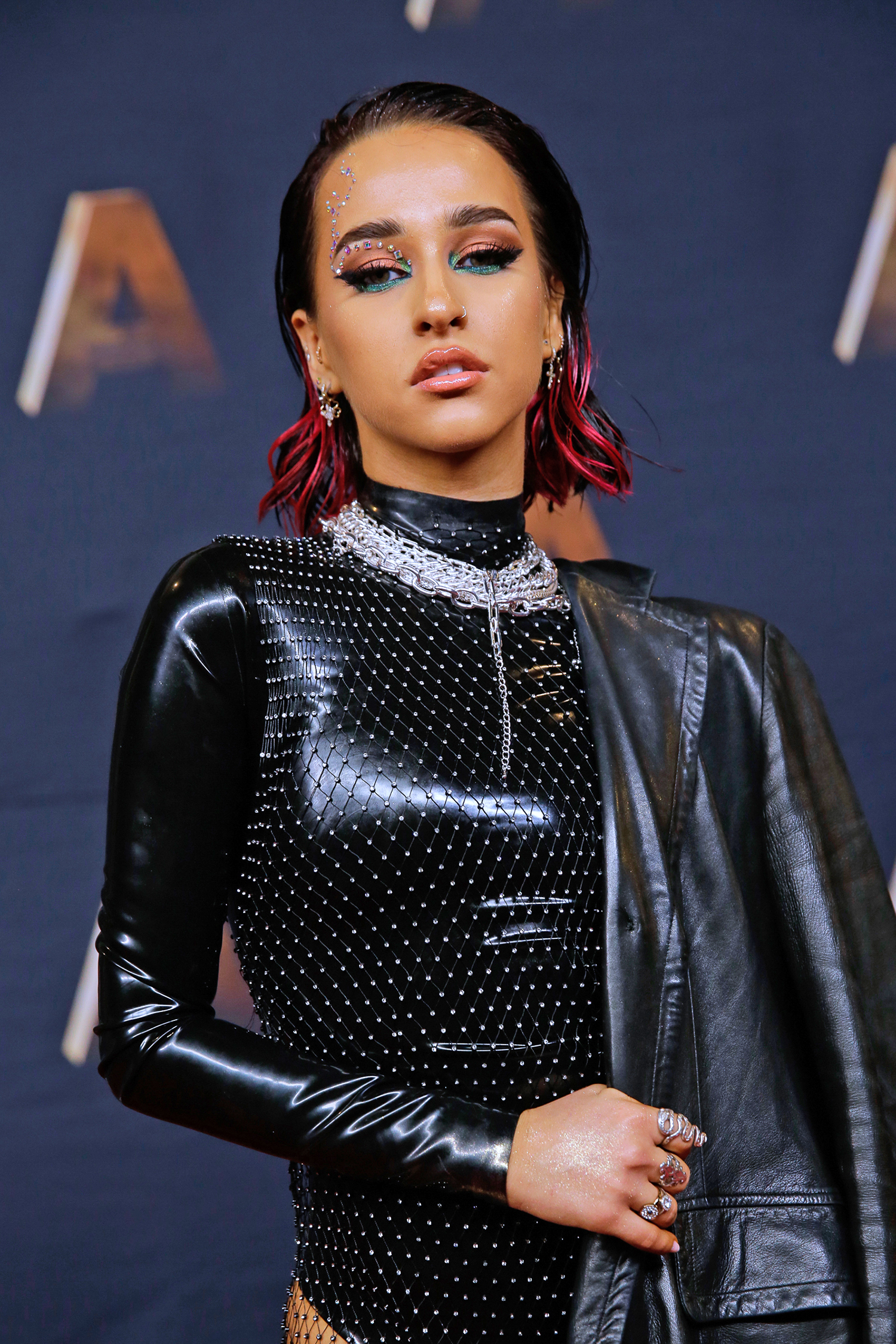
- Holy Molly on the red carpet at The Artist Awards 2021
- Born: Maria Alexandra Florea; 11 January 1996 (age 30); Bucharest, Romania
- Other name: Miss Mary
- Education: Caragiale National University of Theatre and Film
- Occupations: Singer; Songwriter; Musician
- Years active: 2010–present
- Musical career
- Genres: Dance-pop
- Labels: Red Clover; Creator Records; Nitron Music; Global
- Website: www.holymollyguacamolly.com globalrecords.com/our-artists/holy-molly/

Maria Alexandra Florea (born 11 January 1996), known professionally as Holy Molly, is a Romanian singer, songwriter and musician. She started her career in 2010 as Miss Mary, and in 2019 she reinvented herself and became Holy Molly.

== Life and career ==
=== 1996–2007: Early Life ===
Maria Alexandra Florea was born on 11 January 1996 in Bucharest, Romania. She started singing as a child, under the guidance of her mother, who wanted to become a singer. In 1999, she started singing in the Allegretto Children Choir of Bucharest. At the age of seven, she met her first singing teacher and began attending music competitions all over the country. She then attended the Gymnasium School of Arts no. 4 in Bucharest for piano and guitar classes.

=== 2008-2018: "Miss Mary" Period ===
At twelve years old, she meets Mihai Căciulă, who would become her manager. She went to a studio for the first time in 2010 and recorded “You Don’t Love Me” under the stage name of Miss Mary. Shortly after, she signed with a local record label called Red Clover and released her first music video for “Open”. In 2016, she started writing songs and became an independent artist. In 2017, she released “Shadows”, her first international song with “It's Different”, immediately followed by “Outlaw”. During this period, she graduated from Caragiale National University of Theatre and Film in Bucharest, an acting speciality.

=== 2019-present: "Holy Molly" Period ===
In 2019, after one year of failed attempts to work with people and create music, she released “Everybody’s Scared”, her first single as Holy Molly. Her next song "Ménage À Trois" was a collaboration with the German producer Lizot. On August 6, 2021, Holy Molly released a collaboration with the French-Italian duo Shanguy called “C’est La Vie.” On 12 September 2025, she released her debut album, Puls.

== Discography ==
=== Singles ===
==== As lead artist ====
Title	Year	Peak chart positions						Certifications	Album details
Title	Year	ROM	CZE	POL	CIS	RUS	UKR	Certifications	Album details
"Everybody's Scared" (with Parah Dice)	2019	—	—	—	—	—	—		Non-album single
"Ménage à trois" (with Lizot)	2019	—	—	27	103	—	—		Non-album single
"Back to Her" (with Lizot & Alex Parker)	2020	—	—	—	—	—	—		Non-album single
"Alcohol"	2020	—	—	—	—	—	—		Non-album single
"Twinkle Twinkle"	2021	74	—	—	707	—	—		Non-album single
"Talk Talk" (with Drenchill)	2021	—	—	—	—	—	—		Non-album single
"Gangster" (with Cosmo & Skoro)	2021	—	—	—	—	—	—		Non-album single
"C'est la vie" (with Shanguy)	2021	—	—	—	203	—	—		Non-album single
"Shot a Friend"	2021	—	—	2	4	1	1	ZPAV: Gold	Non-album single
"Bang Bang"	2021	—	—	—	—	—	—		Non-album single
"Plouă" (with Tata Vlad)	2022	1	—	—	76	—	—		Non-album single
"Douche"	2022	—	—	—	—	—	—		Non-album single
"Watch Me"	2022	—	—	—	—	—	—		Non-album single
"Sunday Night" (with Lizot)	2022	—	—	2	—	—	—		Non-album single
"Pump It Up" (with Olivia Addams)	2022	—	—	—	—	—	—		Non-album single
"Talk to You Later"	2025	—	8	—	—	—	—		Non-album single
"—" denotes a recording that did not chart or was not released in that territory.

==== Promotional singles ====
Title	Year	Album details
„În Golul Tău (Live Session)” (with Olivia Addams and The Motans)	2021	Non-album single
