= Nicole Cherry =

Romanian pop singer

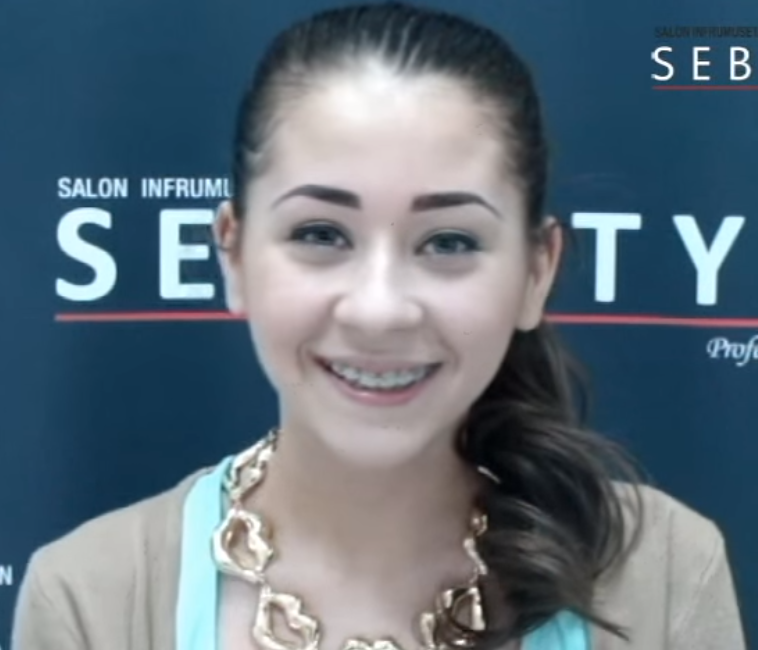
- Born: Nicoleta Janina Ghinea; 5 December 1998 (age 27); Bucharest, Romania
- Occupation: Singer
- Years active: 2013–present
- Musical career
- Genres: Pop
- Instrument: Vocals
- Labels: MediaPro Music, Global Records

Nicole Cherry (born Nicoleta Janina Ghinea; 5 December 1998) is a Romanian pop singer.

== Career ==
Cherry performed in a number of singing and dancing competitions as a child. She gained success in 2013 with her single "Memories" which was released at the age of 14.

Cherry won the 2014 Zu Music Award for "Best Breakthrough" artist.

In 2023, she played a lead role in "Romina VTM" a Romanian movie featuring other Romanian artists, such as Rareș, Bogdan DLP and YNY Sebi.

She was chosen to dub the character Sophie in Romanian for Disney movie "The BFG" and to sing the main theme from "Miraculous: Tales of Ladybug & Cat Noir."

== Discography ==
=== Singles ===
| Year | Title | Peak chart positions | |
| Year | Title | ROM | Billboard Romania |
|---|---|---|---|
| 2013 | "Memories" | 1 | |
| 2014 | "Phenomeno" | 88 | |
| 2014 | "Vara mea" | 11 | |
| 2014 | "Fata naivă" | 92 | |
| 2016 | "Cuvintele tale" | 34 | |
| 2018 | "Ceasul" | 79 | |
| 2018 | "Dansează amândoi" | 40 | |
| 2019 | "Pop That” | | |
| 2022 | "Florile tale” | | 1 |
| 2023 | "Nu mai consum" (ft. Tata Vlad) | 2 | 2 |
| 2023 | "Aș vrea să mă las de tine" | | 1 |

Year-end charts

| Year | Song | Chart | Position |
|---|---|---|---|
| 2013 | "Memories" | Romanian Top 100 | 4 |
| 2014 | "Vara mea" | Romanian Top 100 | 32 |
| 2014 | "Memories" | Romanian Top 100 | 60 |

=== Other songs ===
- 2013: "Never Say Never"
- 2013: "Yes I Can"
- 2014: "The World Is Ours" (with David Correy featuring Monoblanco)
- 2015: "Până vine vineri"
- 2015: "Vive la vida" (featuring Mohombi)
- 2016: "Cine iubește"
- 2016: "Se poartă vara" (featuring Connect-R)
- 2017: "Uneori"
- 2017: "Soy como soy" (featuring Joey Montana)

=== Featured in ===
- 2014: "Ne facem auziți" (Vunk si Ai Nostri)
- 2015: "Rezervat" (Doddy feat. Nicole Cherry)
- 2015: "Pot eu să te urăsc" (Angelo feat. Nicole Cherry)
- 2018: "Grenada" (JUNO feat. Nicole Cherry)
- 2018: "S'agapao" (Alama feat. Nicole Cherry x Pacha Man)
- 2018: "Esentele" (Stefania feat. Nicole Cherry)
- 2018: "Vinovat" (Dorian Popa feat. Nicole Cherry)

== Personal life ==
She is of Roma origin on her maternal side. She has a daughter named Anastasia (born on 27 November 2021) with Florin Popa to whom she is engaged.
