= 1990 in Romania =

- Decades: 1970s; 1980s; 1990s; 2000s; 2010s
- See also: Other events of 1990; History of Romania; Timeline of Romanian history; Years in Romania

This is a list of 1990 events that occurred in Romania.

== Incumbents ==
- President: Ion Iliescu
- Prime Minister: Petre Roman

== Politics ==
- 1990 Romanian general election.

== Events ==
=== January ===
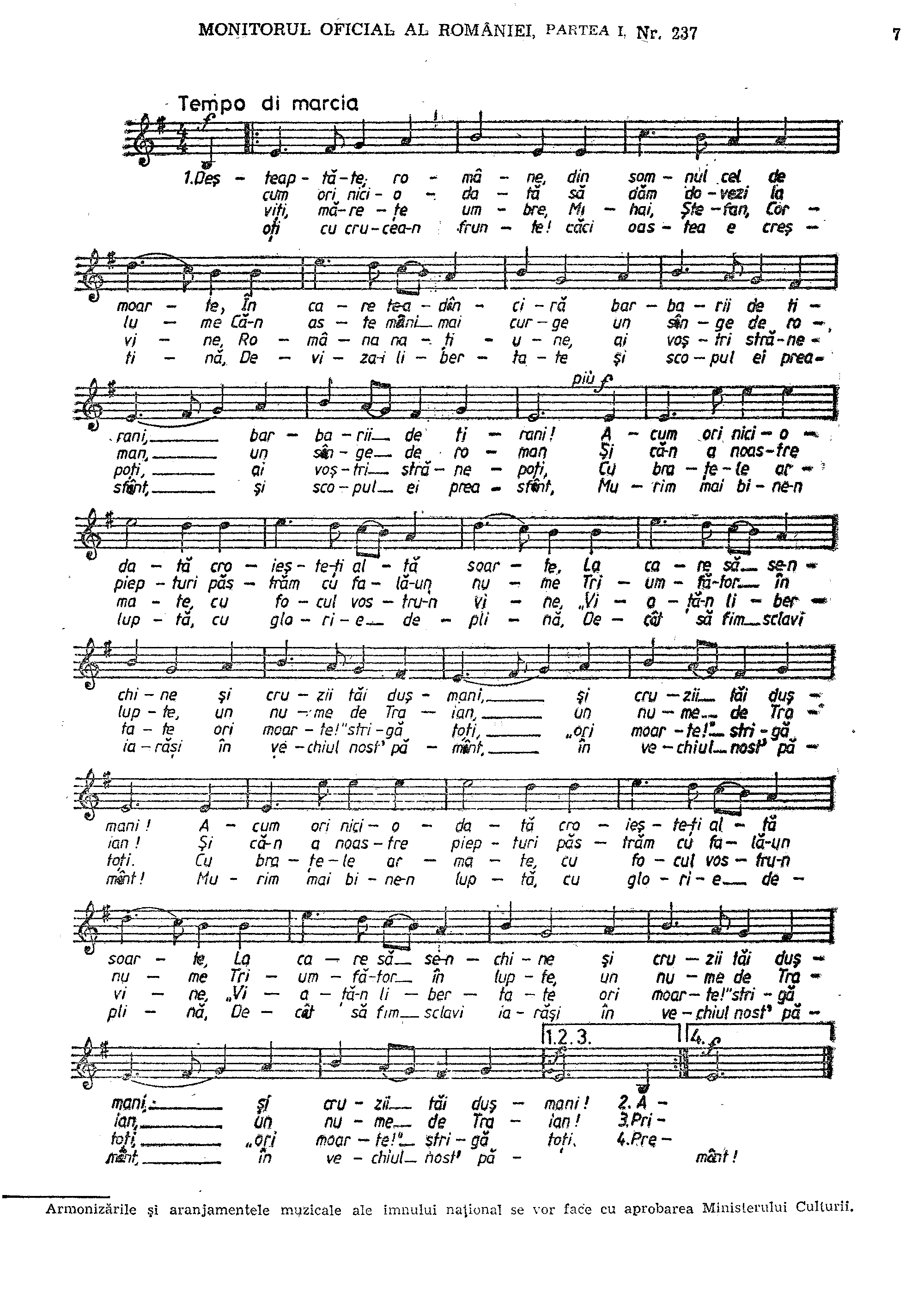
"Deșteaptă-te, române!" becomes Romania's national anthem.

- 12 January – National Mourning Day in memory of the victims of the Revolution of 1989.
- 20 January – The first issue of Revista 22, published by the Group for Social Dialogue, appears in Bucharest.
- 24 January – The poem "Un răsunet" written by Andrei Mureșanu (1848), on the music of Anton Pann, is selected as the State Anthem of Romania under the name "Deșteaptă-te, române!".
- 28 January – In Bucharest, in Victory Square, is held a meeting organized by PNȚCD, PNL, PSDR and other parties protesting against the decision of the FSN to participate in elections. In parallel, is conducted a counter-manifestation organized by FSN and supported by workers at IMGB, ICTB, IMMR and IIRUC.
- 29 January – January 1990 Mineriad: Over 5,000 miners from the Jiu Valley arrive in the capital following calls launched in the media by President Ion Iliescu.

=== February ===
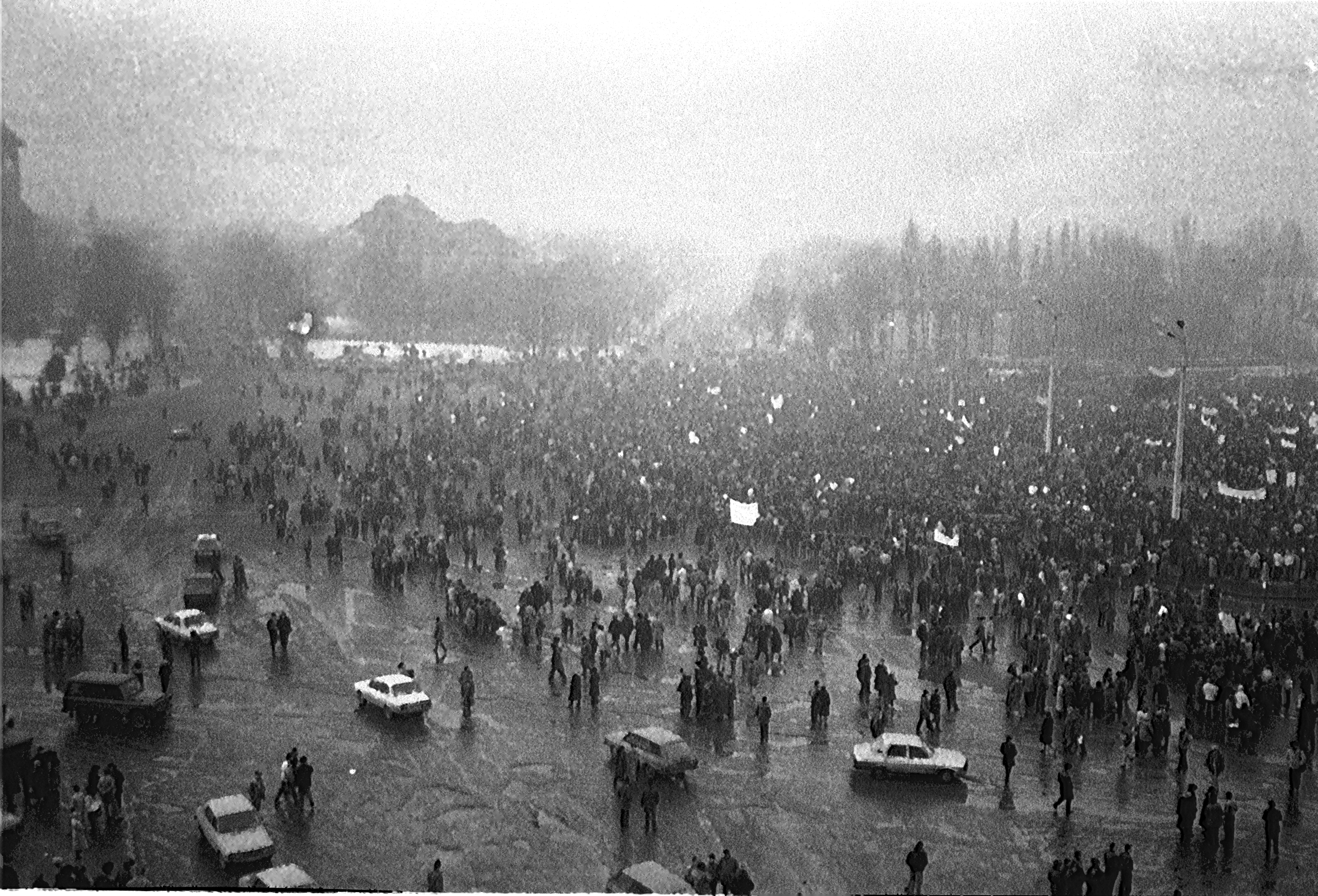
Large crowd near Victoria Palace during the February 1990 Mineriad

- 2 February
  - The Romanian Society for Philosophy is reestablished.
  - Bucharest Military Court pronounces judgment in the trial of four of Ceaușescu's close collaborators – Manea Mănescu, Tudor Postelnicu, Emil Bobu, and Ion Dincă: life imprisonment and total confiscation of personal property.
- 5 February – The Museum of the Romanian Peasant is founded.
- 6 February – Transformation of NSFC into a political party, under the name of National Salvation Front (NSF).
- 15 February – The Theater Union of Romania (UNITER) is founded, with actor Ion Caramitru as president.
- 28 February – February 1990 Mineriad: 4,000 miners from the Jiu Valley clash with law enforcers. Dozens of people are injured and 105 arrested.

=== March ===
- 11 March – The popular demonstration in Timișoara Opera Square begins, with protesters adopting the Proclamation of Timișoara.
- 15 March – Five people are killed and hundreds injured in ethnic clashes between Romanians and Hungarians in Târgu Mureș.
- 21 March – Romania applies to join the Council of Europe; the request was accepted on 7 October 1993.
- 26 March – The Romanian Intelligence Service is established.

=== April ===
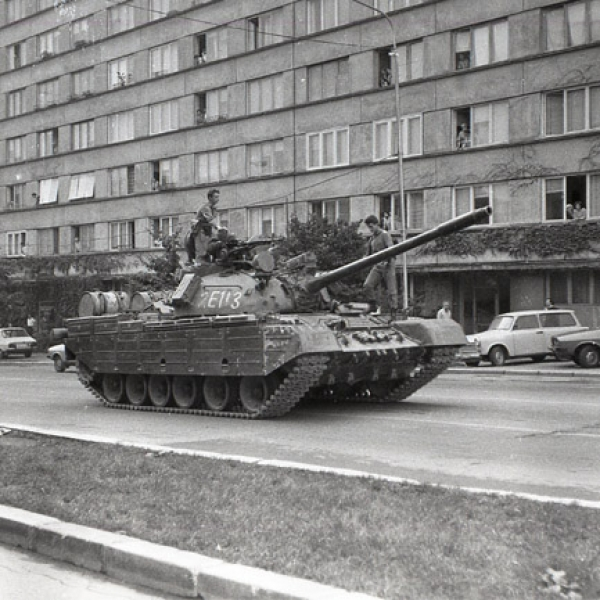
A TR-85 tank in Bucharest during the Golaniad

- 7 April – Ion Iliescu is elected President of the National Salvation Front.
- 22 April – Golaniad: After an electoral rally of PNȚCD, some of the demonstrators barricade in the University Square, Bucharest.

=== May ===
- 6 May – More than 1,200,000 people form a human chain along the Prut River, on a length of 700 km (430 mi). For six hours, Romanians were allowed to cross the Prut River in the Moldavian SSR without passports and visas.
- 20 May – Are held the first free elections in Romania after the Second World War. Turnout is over 90%. Ion Iliescu is elected President in the first ballot, receiving 85% of the votes.
- 24 May – The Masca Theatre is founded by actor Mihai Mălaimare.

=== June ===
- 13 June – June 1990 Mineriad: Six people are shot dead and 746 injured after law enforcers, supported by miners, intervened in force against protesters in University Square and the civilian population.

=== July ===
- 24 July – The Senate of Romania adopts a bill which establishes the national holiday of Romania on 1 December, the day when, in 1918, through the union of Transylvania with Romania, was concluded the formation process of Romanian national state.

=== November ===
- 15 November – A large-scale demonstration on the occasion of three years from the anticommunist uprising of workers and residents of Brașov is held in the city. Led by members of the Association "15 November", demonstrators go through the old route of the demonstration in 1987.

== Births ==
- 23 January – Dorin Lazăr, rugby player
- 27 January
  - Alexia Țalavutis, singer and former member of Lala Band
  - Mihai Onicaș, footballer
- 2 February – Teodor Axinte, footballer
- 22 February – Marius Alexe, footballer
- 27 February – Constantin Drugă, footballer
- 4 March – Cristina Sandu, athlete
- 15 March – Octavian Ionescu, footballer
- 16 March – Ionuț Rada, footballer
- 17 April – Filip Lazăr, rugby player and kinesiologist
- 1 June – Bianca Perie, hammer thrower
- 18 June – Sandra Izbașa, Olympic gymnast
- 20 August – Ioan Valeriu Achiriloaie, alpine skier
- 3 September – Ovidiu Covaciu, footballer
- 30 September – Iuliana Paleu, sprint canoeist
- 17 October – Marius Copil, tennis player

== Deaths ==
- 31 January – Alexandru Tatos, director and screenwriter (b. 1937)
- 15 February – George Ciucu, mathematician and corresponding member of the Romanian Academy (b. 1927)
- 20 February – Alexandru Rosetti, spiritual patron of the Romanian school of linguistics (b. 1895)
- 23 February – Florin Pucă, graphic artist, poet and actor (b. 1932)
- 17 April – Paul Dimo, engineer and member of the Romanian Academy (b. 1905)
- 31 July – Nicolae Giosan, communist dignitary, agronomist, geneticist and member of the Romanian Academy (b. 1921)
- 15 September – Constantin Dinculescu, founder of the Romanian school of power plants (b. 1898)
- 19 September – Ioana Radu, folk music and romances singer (b. 1917)
- 1 October – Ioana Em. Petrescu, literary critic, historian, and professor (b. 1941)
- 13 November – Mircea Ionnițiu, writer
- 20 December – Valeriu Călinoiu, footballer (b. 1928)
- ? – Atanasia Ionescu, gymnast (b. 1935)
