= Alina Eremia discography =

Discography

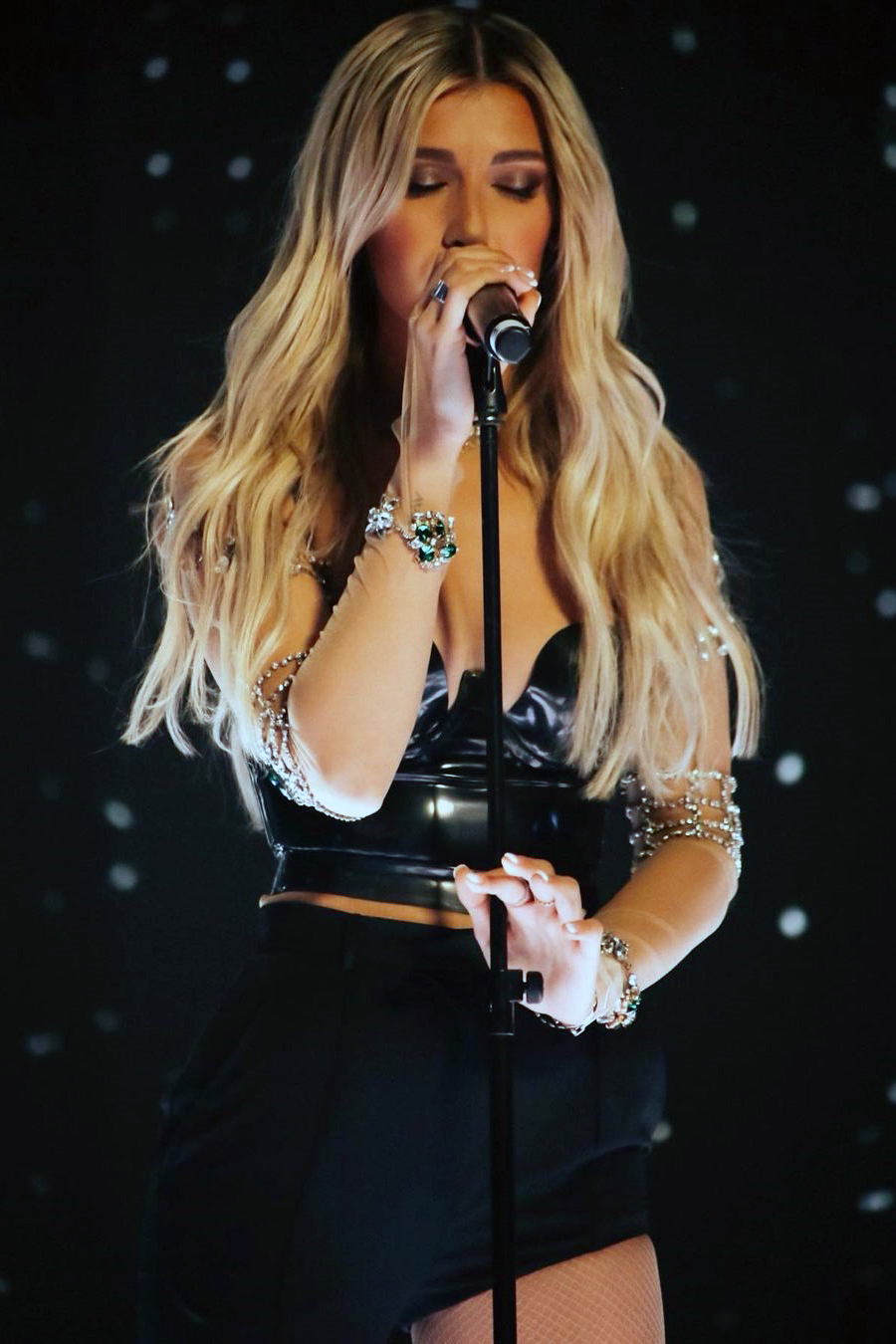
- Alina Eremia performing in 2020.
- Studio albums: 2
- EPs: 1
- Soundtrack albums: 5
- Live albums: 1
- Singles: 43
- Promotional singles: 7

Romanian singer and actress Alina Eremia has released two studio albums, one EP, 43 singles (including ten as a featured artist) and seven promotional singles. Her YouTube channel surpassed 225 million total views as of March 2022.

== Albums ==
=== Studio albums ===
Title	Album details
360	Released: November 1, 2017; Label: MediaPro Music / Universal Music România; Format: CD, Digital download, Streaming
Déjà Vu	Released: May 14, 2021; Label: Global; Format: CD, Digital download, Streaming

=== EP ===
Title	Album details
Show Must Go On (Live)	Released: January 5, 2021; Label: Global; Format: Digital download

== Singles ==
=== As lead artist ===
List of singles as lead artist
Title	Year	Peak chart positions	Album
Title	Year	ROU	Album
"Deep In Love"	2010	—	Non Stop Hits
"With or Without You"	2012	—	Non-album singles
"Tu ești vara mea"	2013	7	Non-album singles
"Deep In Love"	2014	—	Non-album singles
"Cum se face"	2014	—	360
"Când luminile se sting"	2014	2	Non-album singles
"Iarna" (with Marcel Pavel, Monica Anghel, Gabriel Cotabiță, Luminița Anghel, Vlad Miriță, Nico, Valentin Dinu, George Miron and Acapella)	2014	—	Non-album singles
"Played You"	2015	—	Femei Perfecte
"You"	2015	—	Non-album single
"A fost o nebunie"	2015	2	360
"Original"	2015	—	Non-album single
"De ce ne îndrăgostim"	2016	10	360
"Rujul meu"	2016	—	Non-album singles
"Vorbe pe dos"	2017	31	Non-album singles
"Poartă-mă"	2017	13	360
"NaNaNa"	2017	—	360
"Îmbrăcați sau goi" (with Vunk)	2017	—	360
"Îmi dai curaj" (with Grasu XXL)	2017	74	360
"Cineva"	2017	—	360
"A fost să fie"	2017	—	360
"În doi"	2017	—	360
"Don't Shut Me Down"	2017	—	360
"Doar noi" (with Mark Stam)	2018	29	Non-album singles
"Aș da"	2018	—	Non-album singles
"Tatuaj"	2018	62	Non-album singles
"You Light up the Night" (with Markus Schulz)	2018	—	We Are the Light
"69"	2018	—	Non-album singles
"Filme cu noi" (with Nosfe)	2019	—	Non-album singles
"De sticlă"	2019	—	Non-album singles
"Dragoste nu-i"	2019	—	Non-album singles
"Printre cuvinte"	2019	42	Déjà Vu
"Anotimpuri"	2019	—	Non-album single
"Foi de adio"	2019	—	The Session
"3 Luni"	2019	—	The Session
"Aripi de vis"	2020	67	Déjà Vu
"BRB" (with Nane)	2020	—	Déjà Vu
"Aripi de vis" (with Dirty Nano)	2020	—	Non-album singles
"Noi"	2020	1	Non-album singles
"Să fii fericit"	2020	—	Non-album singles
"Cel mai frumos cadou" (with Keo and Alexandra Ungureanu)	2020	—	Non-album singles
"Dependența mea"	2021	67	Déjà Vu
"Gândurile mele"	2021	—	Déjà Vu
"Noi"	2021	—	Déjà Vu
"Déjà Vu"	2021	—	Déjà Vu
"Bipolară"	2021	—	Déjà Vu
"Arde"	2021	—	Déjà Vu
"Benzina"	2021	—	Déjà Vu
"Interludiu"	2021	—	Déjà Vu
"Cerul roșu"	2021	—	Non-album singles
"Red Lights" (with C-BooL)	2021	—	Non-album singles
"Pune-mă la loc"	2021	—	Non-album singles
"20:29"	2022	—	Non-album singles
"—" denotes a title that did not chart, or was not released in that territory.

=== As featured artist ===
List of singles as featured artist
Title	Year	Peak chart positions	Album
Title	Year	ROU	Album
"You're The One That I Want" (Lala Band featuring Alina Eremia and Dorian Popa)	2012	—	Lala Love Stories
"Nights In White Satin" (Lala Band featuring Alina Eremia and Dorian Popa)	2012	—	Lala Love Stories
"Piece By Piece" (Lala Band featuring Alina Eremia)	2012	—	Lala Love Stories
"Memory" (Lala Band featuring Alina Eremia)	2012	—	Lala Love Stories
"Holding Out for a Hero" (Lala Band featuring Alina Eremia)	2012	—	Lala Love Stories
"I Cried For You" (Lala Band featuring Alina Eremia)	2012	—	Lala Love Stories
"Nine Million Bicycles" (Lala Band featuring Alina Eremia and Dorian Popa)	2012	—	Lala Love Stories
"People" (Lala Band featuring Alina Eremia)	2012	—	Lala Love Stories
"To The Moon And Back" (Lala Band featuring Alina Eremia, Dorian Popa, Cristina Ciobănașu and Vlad Gherman)	2012	—	Lala Love Stories
"Summer Nights" (Lala Band featuring Alina Eremia, Dorian Popa and Liviu Teodorescu)	2012	—	LaLa Summer Love
"Feeling Good" (Lala Band featuring Alina Eremia, Sore, Dima and Bianca)	2012	—	LaLa Summer Love
"Mesaj" (Lala Band featuring Alina Eremia and Dorian Popa)	2012	—	LaLa Summer Love
"Right Here Waiting" (Lala Band featuring Alina Eremia, Dorian Popa and Vlad Gherman)	2012	—	Lala Love Stories 2
"Broken Strings" (Lala Band featuring Alina Eremia and Liviu Teodorescu)	2012	—	Lala Love Stories 2
"Russian Roulette" (Lala Band featuring Alina Eremia)	2012	—	Lala Love Stories 2
"Got You on My Mind" (Lala Band featuring Alina Eremia and Liviu Teodorescu)	2012	—	Lala Love Stories 2
"Suddenly I See" (Lala Band featuring Alina Eremia, Sore, Cristina Ciobănașu, Andrada Popa and Ana Baniciu)	2012	—	Lala Dance
"Din albul iernii" (Lala Band featuring Alina Eremia, Dorian Popa, Cristina Ciobănașu and Vlad Gherman)	2012	—	Din albul iernii
"Got You on My Mind" (Lala Band featuring Alina Eremia and Liviu Teodorescu)	2013	—	Lala Love Forever
"În dreapta ta" (Vescan featuring Alina Eremia)	2013	10	Non-album singles
"Ne facem auziți" (Vunk featuring Alina Eremia, Nicole Cherry, RO’MAN, Aylin, Gabriel Cotabiță, Loredana, Mihai Georgescu and Sișu)	2014	—	Hituri și mituri
"Ilegal" (Mircea Eremia featuring Alina Eremia)	2015	—	Non-album singles
"Filme" (Rashid featuring Alina Eremia)	2015	—	Non-album singles
"Don't Worry About It" (DOMG featuring Alina Eremia)	2015	—	Non-album singles
"Dulce amar" (DJ Sava featuring Alina Eremia and What's UP)	2016	15	Non-album singles
"Johnny / Sanie cu zurgălăi" (Damian & Brothers featuring Alina Eremia)	2016	—	Gypsy Rock: Change or Die
"Out of My Mind" (Novaspace featuring Alina Eremia)	2017	—	360
"Mă nenorocești" (Nosfe featuring Alina Eremia)	2017	—	Uncle Benz
"Freeze" (Monoir featuring Alina Eremia)	2018	78	Non-album singles
"Love & Lover" (Leonid Rudenko featuring Alina Eremia and Dominique Young Unique)	2018	—	Non-album singles
"Promite-mi" (Dirty Nano featuring Alina Eremia)	2019	34	Non-album singles
"Enchanté" (Faydee featuring Alina Eremia and Raluka)	2019	41	Non-album singles
"Din trecut" (The Motans featuring Alina Eremia)	2020	—	Non-album singles
"—" denotes a title that did not chart, or was not released in that territory.

=== Promotional singles ===
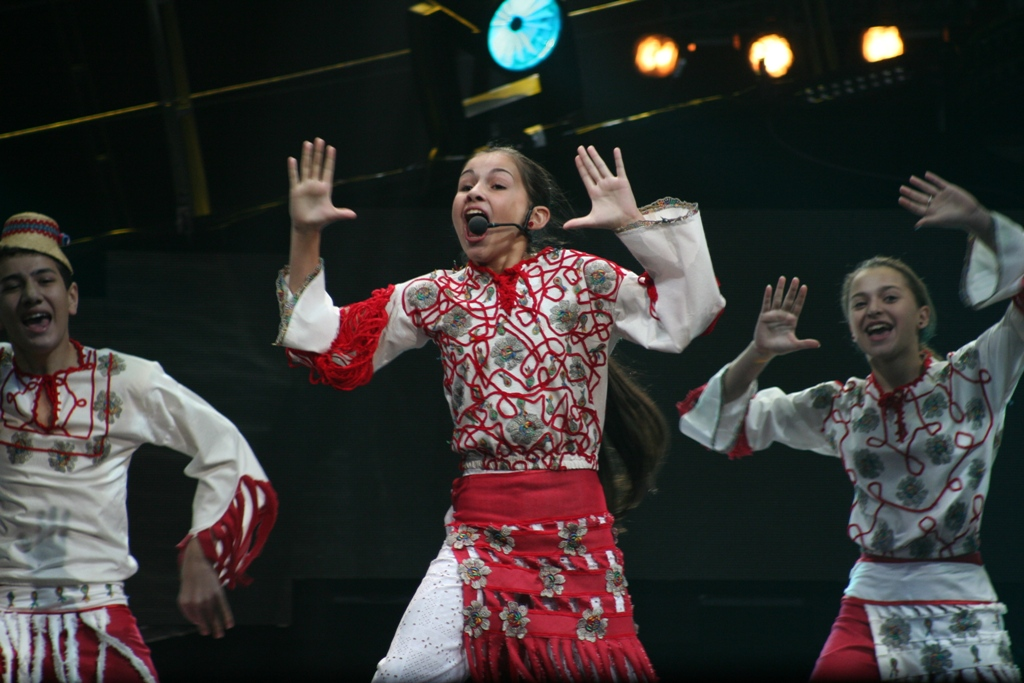
Alina Eremia at the Junior Eurovision Song Contest 2005.

List of promotional singles
Title	Year	Album
"Ţurai"	2005	Non-album singles
"E sărbătoare, Vine Moș Crăciun" (with Andra Gogan, Andrada Popa, Gabriela Amzaru, Marius Țeicu, Mihaela Mihăescu and Yasemin Koc)	2013	Crăciun Fericit
"Astăzi s-a născut Christos" (with Cătălin Tamazlican, Ioana Badea and Patricia Matei)	2013	Crăciun Fericit
"Să înceapă gălăgia" (with VH2, Anda Adam and What's Up)	2016	Non-album singles
"Crăciunul românesc" (with Andra, Carla's Dreams, Alex Velea, Sergiu and Andrei)	2016	Non-album singles
"Imnul optimismului" (with Liviu Teodorescu, Dorian Popa, Jazzy Jo, Lora, Sore, Feli, Silviu Pașca, Doru Todoruț, Giulia, Nicole Cherry, Alexandru Mușat and Muse Quartet)	2017	Non-album singles
"Imnul Forza ZU 2019" (with The Motans, Antonia and Selly)	2019	Non-album singles
