= 1989 in Romania =

- Decades: 1960s; 1970s; 1980s; 1990s; 2000s
- See also: Other events of 1989; History of Romania; Timeline of Romanian history; Years in Romania

This is a list of 1989 events that occurred in Romania.

== Incumbents ==
- President: Nicolae Ceaușescu (until 22 December), Ion Iliescu (starting 26 December)
- Prime Minister: Constantin Dăscălescu (until 25 December), Petre Roman (starting 26 December)

== Events ==
=== March ===
- Six retired senior figures in the Romanian Communist Party, including Gheorghe Apostol and Silviu Brucan, write an open letter to Nicolae Ceaușescu. They call for the relaxation of Ceaușescu's demand for increased exports, the release of more food for internal consumption, the investment in new technology for the industries, the halt of a vastly expensive program of prestige projects of doubtful economic value and for the dictator to put an end to systematization.

=== April ===
- President Nicolae Ceaușescu announces that Romania had paid all of its external debt.
- 18 April – The localities of Aninoasa (Hunedoara County), Fundulea (Călărași County), Lehliu Gară (Călărași County), Mioveni (Argeș County) and Valea lui Mihai (Bihor County) are declared cities.

=== May ===
- The Italian football club AC Milan wins the 1989 European Cup final, beating Steaua București of Romania 4–0 in Barcelona.

=== September ===
- 10 September - A Romanian cruiser carrying 179 people collides with a Bulgarian tugboat on the Danube, near Galați. Only 18 people are rescued from the cruiser.

=== November ===
- 20–25 November - The 14th party congress takes place.
- 23 November – During the XIV Congress of the RCP, first shift workers from Timișoara Mechanical Works try to organize a revolt against the communist regime. Their movement is quelled by the Securitate organs.
- 24 November – Nicolae Ceaușescu, the sole candidate for the communist party's leadership, is unanimously re-elected by the Central Committee as the general secretary of the Romanian Communist Party.

=== December ===
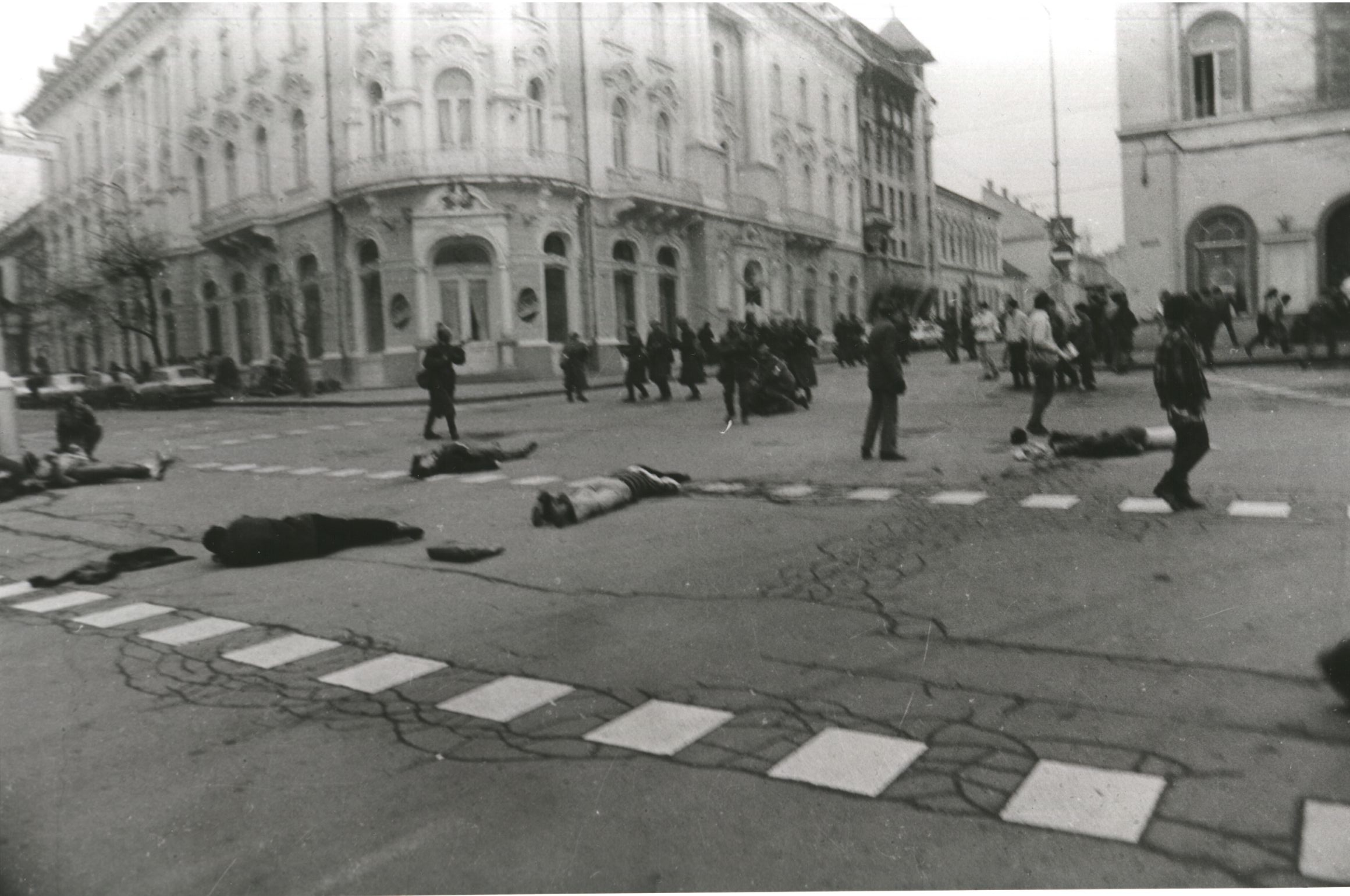
Bodies of protesters killed by Securitate officers in Cluj-Napoca

- 15 December - Demonstrators in Timișoara try preventing the arrest of Protestant clergyman László Tőkés.
- 16 December – The Romanian Revolution begins in Timișoara when rioters break into the Committee Building and cause extensive vandalism. Their attempts to set the buildings on fire are foiled by military units.
- 17 December - Nicolae Ceaușescu orders troops to fire on a crowd of protesters in Timișoara.
- 19 December - Parts of Romania are reported to be under virtual martial law by Reuter.
- 20 December – A general strike breaks out in all the factories in Timișoara. Timișoara is declared the first city free of communism in Romania.
- 21 December
  - A huge rally in Bucharest turns into chaos as firecrackers explode at the periphery of the gathering. Soldiers, tanks, APCs, USLA officers and Securitate officers dressed in civilian clothes crack on demonstrators, leaving casualties and significant material damage.
  - Peaceful demonstrators in Arad, Brăila, Cluj-Napoca, Constanța, Hunedoara, Sibiu and Timișoara are shot dead by Securitate officers.

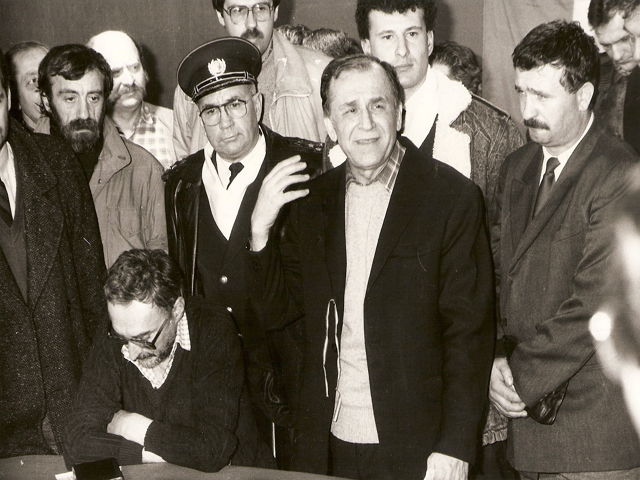
Ion Iliescu at the Romanian Television.

- 22 December – Army units defect to the side of the demonstrators while the Ceaușescus flee and the Council of the National Salvation Front announces that it has overthrown the government.
- 23 December - The Ceaușescu spouses are reported to have been captured.

National Salvation Front Council press release about the execution of the Ceaușescu spouses.

- 25 December – Trial and execution of Nicolae and Elena Ceaușescu: The Ceaușescu spouses are summarily judged and executed outside the military garrison in Târgoviște.
- 27 December – Petre Roman is appointed Prime Minister of the Government of Romania.
- 28 December – For the first time, after a long break, is held a meeting of the Board of Writers' Union of Romania. Is elected a provisional steering committee, the president being Mircea Dinescu.
- 29 December - The Socialist Republic of Romania is renamed as Romania (Romanian: România).

- 31 December – The Decree-Law no. 8 of 31 December 1989 issued by NSFC reintroduces the political pluralism in Romania.

== Births ==
- 14 January – Dima Trofim, singer and former member of Lala Band
- 28 January – Ruby, singer
- 29 January – Adriana Țăcălie, handball player
- 25 March – Andrei Leonte, singer and songwriter
- 12 April – Antonia Iacobescu, singer and model
- 18 May – Alexandru Chipciu, footballer (FC Steaua București)
- 27 May – Doru Bratu, footballer (FC Steaua București)
- 5 June – Roxana Cocoș, Olympic weightlifter
- 10 June – Alexandra Stan, singer
- 28 June – Bogdan Stancu, footballer (Gençlerbirliği S.K.)
- 15 September – Steliana Nistor, former artistic gymnast
- 3 November – Sore Mihalache, singer and former member of Lala Band
- 7 November – Jimmy Dub, singer
- 14 November
  - Raluka, singer
  - Vlad Chiricheș, footballer (Tottenham Hotspur F.C.)
- 22 November – Gabriel Torje, footballer (RCD Espanyol)

== Deaths ==
=== January ===
- 5 January – Philip Herschkowitz, composer and musicologist (b. 1906)
- 6 January – Marcel Budală, accordionist (b. 1926)
- 10 January – Chris Avram, actor (b. 1931)
- 15 January – Surian Borali, footballer (b. 1960)
- 23 January – Nicolae Al. Rădulescu, geographer, member of the Romanian Academy (b. 1905)

=== March ===
- 2 March – Liviu Cornel Babeș, electrician and painter (b. 1942)
- 6 March – Vasile Netea, writer and historian (b. 1912)
- 22 March – Ștefan Niculescu, lieutenant colonel in World War II (b. 1908)
- 25 March
  - Nina Behar, documentary filmmaker (b. 1930)
  - Radu-Eugeniu Gheorghiu, composer and instrumentist (b. 1915)
- 29 March – Nicolae Steinhardt, Orthodox hermit and writer (b. 1912)

=== April ===
- 2 April – Tudor Vornicu, journalist and television producer (b. 1926)
- 8 April – Horia Demian, basketball player (b. 1942)
- 19 April – Iosif Keber, painter (b. 1897)
- 20 April
  - Constantin Celăreanu, aviator in World War II (b. 1890)
  - Doru Davidovici, aviator and writer (b. 1945)
- 23 April – Ioniță G. Andron, photographic artist, Greek Catholic theologian and lawyer (b. 1917)

=== May ===
- 2 or 3 May – Roland Kirsch, writer (b. 1960)
- 5 May – Alexandru Țitruș, popular music violinist (b. 1922)
- 11 May – Naum Corcescu, sculptor (b. 1922)
- 29 May – Adrian Petringenaru, film director (b. 1933)

=== June ===
- 2 June – Grigore Kiazim, lăutar instrumentist (b. 1931)
- 20 June – Traian Dorz, poet and political prisoner (b. 1914)
- 30 June
  - Vasile Petre Jitariu, biologist, member of the Romanian Academy (b. 1905)
  - Petre Lupu, politician (b. 1920)

=== July ===
- 6 July – Alexandru Pașcanu, composer (b. 1920)
- 7 July – Horia Stamatu, writer and journalist (b. 1912)
- 11 July – Horia Macellariu – counter admiral (b. 1894)
- 12 July – Irimie Staicu, agronomic engineer and agrotechnician, member of the Romanian Academy (b. 1905)
- 25 July – Emil Gavri – popular music singer (b. 1915)

=== August ===
- 30 August – Costin Murgescu, economist, jurist, journalist and diplomat (b. 1919)
- 31 August – Dinu Kivu, theatre and film critic (b. 1942)

=== September ===
- 17 September – Ion Dezideriu Sîrbu, philosopher and writer (b. 1919)
- 21 September – Nuni Anestin, actor (b. 1941)
- 29 September – Alexandru Cosmescu, journalist, writer and anthologist (b. 1922)

=== October ===
- 7 October – Mircea Șeptilici, actor (b. 1912)
- 15 October – Paul Georgescu, literary critic and journalist (b. 1923)

=== November ===
- 1 November – Mihaela Runceanu, singer and vocal techniques teacher (b. 1955)
- 19 November – Zoltán Vadász, actor (b. 1926)
- 25 November – György Bözödi, writer, sociologist and historian (b. 1913)
- 28 November
  - Arsenie Boca, Romanian Orthodox monk, theologian and artist (b. 1910)
  - Ion Popescu-Gopo, graphic artist and animator (b. 1923)

=== December ===
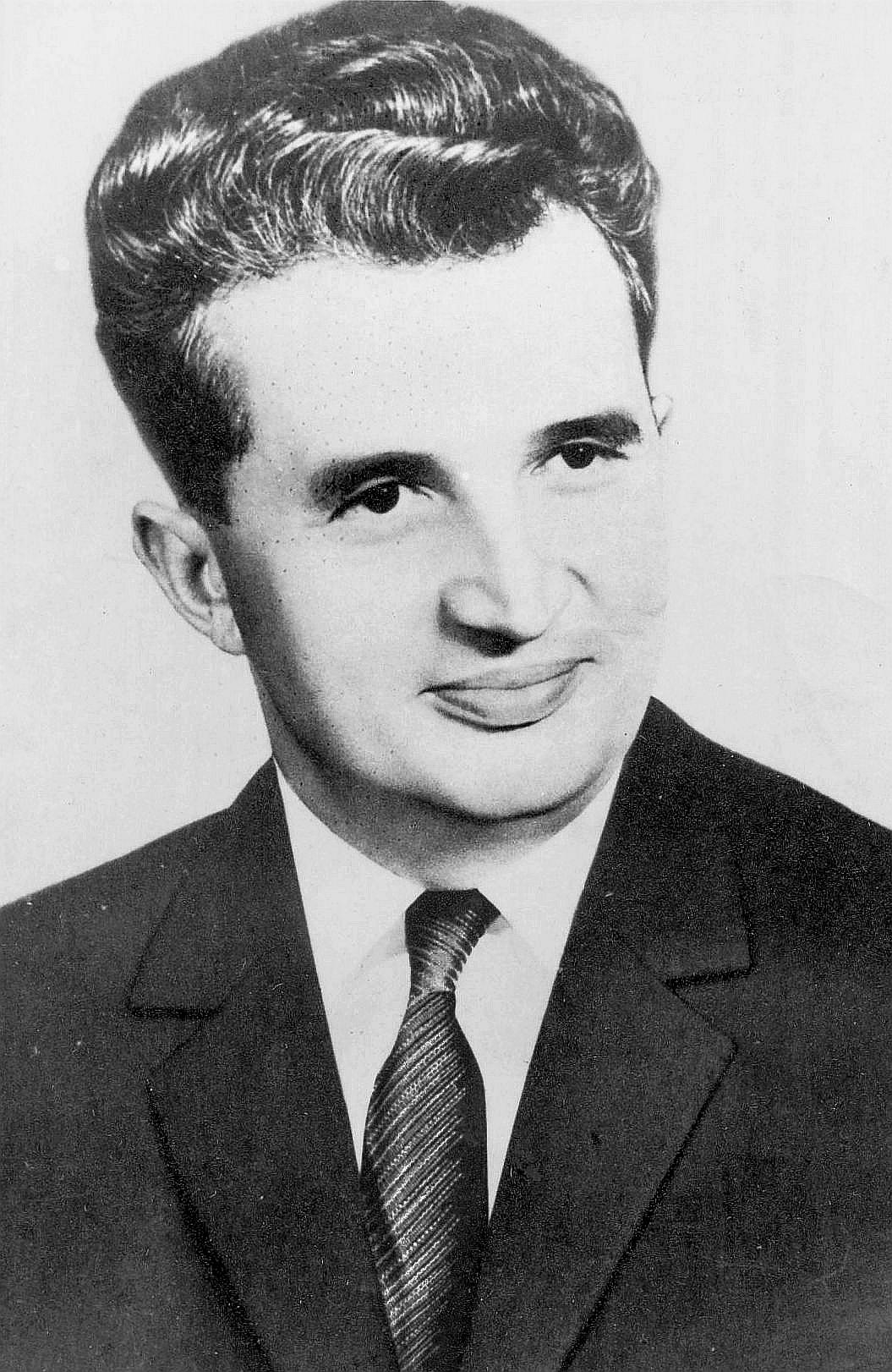
Nicolae Ceaușescu

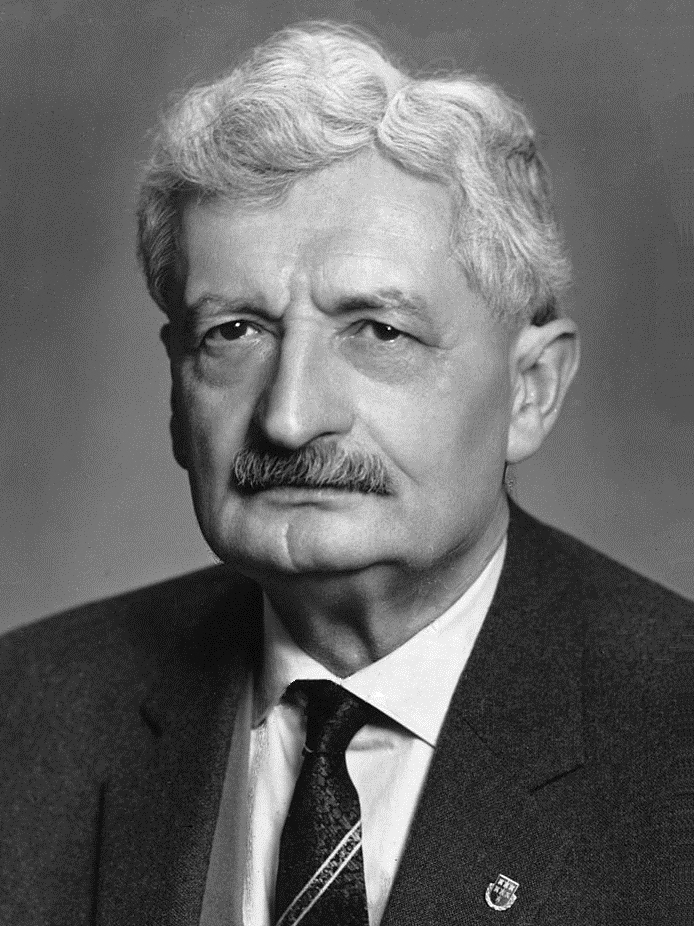
Hermann Oberth

- 12 December – Ioan Zugrăvescu, chemist, member of the Romanian Academy (b. 1910)
- 17 December
  - Anton Breitenhofer, journalist, writer and politician (b. 1912)
  - Gheorghe Vlădescu-Răcoasa, sociologist and politician (b. 1895)
- 18 December – Franz Liebhard, writer (b. 1899)
- 19 December – Alexandru Mitru, writer (b. 1914)
- 20 December – Ioan Moraru, medical doctor, member of the Romanian Academy (b. 1927)
- 22 December – Vasile Milea, politician and general officer (b. 1927)
- 23 December
  - Velicu Mihalea, general officer (birth date unknown)
  - Constantin Nuță, general officer (b. 1919)
- 25 December
  - Nicolae Ceaușescu, leader of the Socialist Republic of Romania (b. 1918)
  - Elena Ceaușescu, Nicolae Ceaușescu's wife (b. 1916)
  - Florică Murariu, rugby union player (b. 1955)
- 27 December – Horia Căciulescu, actor (b. 1922)
- 28 December
  - Marin Ceaușescu, economist and diplomat (b. 1916)
  - Hermann Oberth, inventor and pioneer of astronautics (b. 1894)

=== Full date unknown ===
- Grigore Osipov-Sinești, stomatologist (b. 1907)
- Nicu Stoenescu, romance and tango singer (b. 1911)
