= Ionuț Rada =

Ionuț Rada may refer to:

- Ionuț Rada (footballer, born 1982), Romanian footballer, who played for Romania National Team and several clubs
- Ionuț Rada (footballer, born 1990), Romanian footballer, who played for Romania at U'21s level and Pandurii Târgu Jiu, Mioveni, and Muscelul Câmpulung clubs
