= Octavian Ionescu =

Octavian Ionescu may refer to:

- Octavian Ionescu (footballer, born 1990), Romanian football center back
- Octavian Ionescu (footballer, born 1949), Romanian football midfielder
