= 1997 in Romania =

- Decades: 1970s; 1980s; 1990s; 2000s; 2010s
- See also: Other events of 1997; History of Romania; Timeline of Romanian history; Years in Romania

Events from the year 1997 in Romania.

== Incumbents ==
- President of Romania: Emil Constantinescu
- Prime Minister of Romania: Victor Ciorbea

== Events ==
=== January ===
- 10 January – Miron Cozma is arrested.

=== February ===
- February – The Government of Romania revokes a 1948 communist decree that had annulled Michael I of Romania's Romanian citizenship, thus restoring it to him.
- 21-22 February – President of France, Jacques Chirac, visits Romania.
- 28 February – Michael I of Romania arrives at Henri Coandă International Airport at 13:00 local time with a fully restored Romanian citizenship, during a 6-day tour throughout the country.

=== July ===
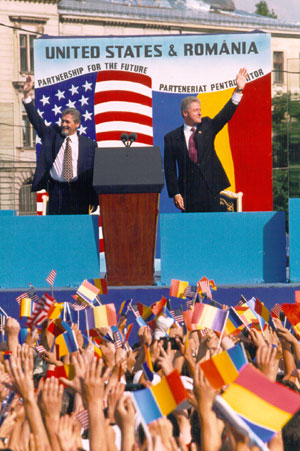

- 11 July – President of the United States, Bill Clinton, visits Romania.

=== December ===
- 2 December – Prime Minister Victor Ciorbea announces at a press conference, at 18:00 local time, the names of the ministers who are to be changed in a cabinet reshuffle of the Ciorbea Cabinet.
- 4 December – The reshuffled Ciorbea Cabinet is approved by the parliament with 277 votes in favour out 486 total possible votes. There were 85 absentees at the vote.
- 5 December – The reshuffled Ciorbea Cabinet takes its oath into office in front of president Emil Constantinescu.
