= 1996 in Romania =

- Decades: 1970s; 1980s; 1990s; 2000s; 2010s
- See also: Other events of 1996; History of Romania; Timeline of Romanian history; Years in Romania

Events from the year 1996 in Romania.

== Incumbents ==
- President of Romania: Ion Iliescu (until 29 November); Emil Constantinescu (starting 29 November)
- Prime Minister of Romania: Nicolae Văcăroiu (until 12 December); Victor Ciorbea (starting 12 December)

== Events ==
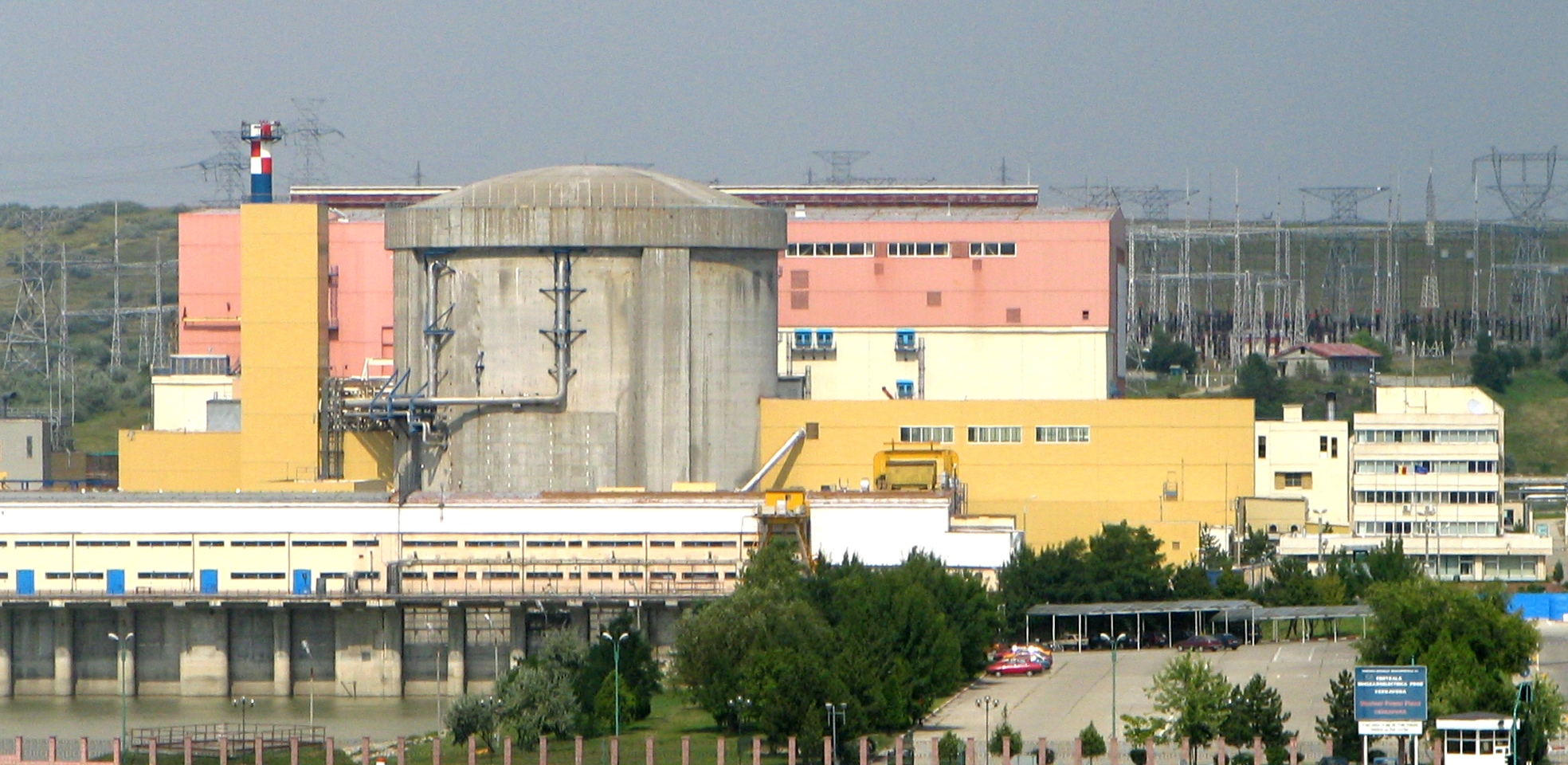

- 17 April – President Ion Iliescu and prime minister of Canada Jean Chretien inaugurate the Cernavodă Nuclear Power Plant.
- 3 May – Secretary general of NATO, Javier Solana, arrives in Bucharest, assuring that Romania is not forgotten in the expansion plans of the NATO.
- 16 September – The prime ministers of Romania and Hungary sign a basic treaty in Timișoara.

== See also ==
- Romania at the 1996 Summer Olympics
- Romania at the 1996 Summer Paralympics
