= 1987 in Romania =

- Decades: 1960s; 1970s; 1980s; 1990s; 2000s
- See also: Other events of 1987; History of Romania; Timeline of Romanian history; Years in Romania

Events from the year 1987 in the Socialist Republic of Romania.

== Events ==
=== February ===
- 16 February – Workers strike at the Nicolina Works (Romanian: Atelierele Nicolina).

=== May ===
- 25-27 May – Mikhail Gorbachev visits Romania.

=== October ===
- 3 October – Tudor Postelnicu is replaced by Iulian Vlad as head of the Securitate.

=== November ===
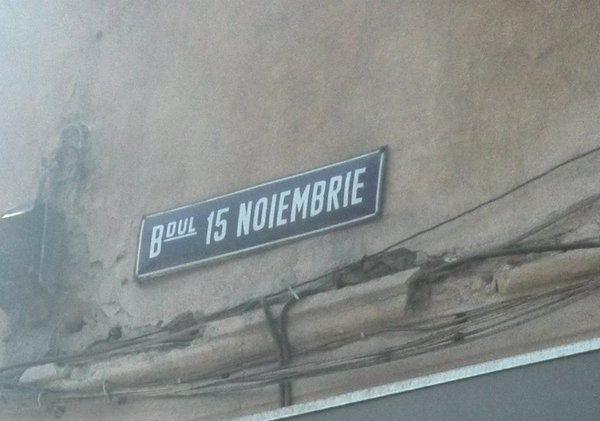

- 15 November – The Brașov rebellion takes places, where workers from the Steagul Roșu plant of Brașov and the Brașov Tractor plant are marching and chanting the 1848 Romanian revolution anthem Deșteaptă-te, române!.

== Deaths ==
- 13 December – George Acsinteanu, prose writer (b. 1905).
