= 1995 in Romania =

- Decades: 1970s; 1980s; 1990s; 2000s; 2010s
- See also: Other events of 1995; History of Romania; Timeline of Romanian history; Years in Romania

Events from the year 1995 in Romania.

== Incumbents ==
- President of Romania: Ion Iliescu
- Prime Minister of Romania: Nicolae Văcăroiu

== Events ==
- 15–17 May – German president Roman Herzog visits Romania. He is the first German president to do so since 1980.
- 16 June – McDonald's opens its first restaurant in Romania, inside the Unirea S.A. building in Bucharest.
- 21 June – The Snagov Declaration is signed by the leaders of the Romanian parliamentary parties to commit to Romania's accession to the European Union (EU).

== Births ==
- 5 March – Alexandru Aldea, footballer.

== Deaths ==
- 21 February – Cristian Popescu, poet (born 1959).
- 1 March – Emil Petru, football player (born 1939).
- 12 March – Dumitru Almaș, journalist, novelist, historian, writer, and professor (born 1908).
