= 1993 in Romania =

- Decades: 1970s; 1980s; 1990s; 2000s; 2010s
- See also: Other events of 1993; History of Romania; Timeline of Romanian history; Years in Romania

Events from the year 1993 in Romania.

== Incumbents ==
- President of Romania: Ion Iliescu
- Prime Minister of Romania: Nicolae Văcăroiu

== Events ==
=== January ===
- 26 January – George Homoștean is arrested in "The Bus" case Romanian: Dosarul "Autobuzul"), about a 1981 operation where 6 bus passengers were murdered.

=== February ===
- 6 February – A former interior minister and seven police officers confess about having had taken part in "The Bus" Operation of 1981.
- 8 February – Gheorghe Vîlceanu replaces Doru Viorel Pană as prefect of Bucharest.

=== March ===
- 24 March – The government decides to establish a Council for National Minorities, a governmental body.
- 31 March – The National Salvation Front fuses with the Democratic Party (Romanian: Partidul Democrat).
- April – Telefónica Romania, the first mobile phone operator in Romania, launches the Telemobil service.

=== April ===
- 14 April – The Council for National Minorities, representative of 17 ethnic groups living in Romania, is established.

=== May ===
- 23 May – The National Salvation Front officially renames itself to Democratic Party (FSN) (Romanian: Partidul Democrat (FSN)).

=== June ===
- 9-10 June – The Democratic National Salvation Front absorbs the Republican Party (Romanian: Partidul Republican), the Cooperatist Party (Romanian: Partidul Cooperatist) and the Socialist Democratic Party, renaming itself into the Romanian Social Democratic Party. Oliviu Gherman is reelected the party's president and Adrian Năstase is elected executive president.

=== July ===
- 1 July – The Democratic Party (FSN) creates the Social-Democratic Alliance (Romanian: Alianța Social-Democrată, ASD) with the Traditional Social-Democratic Party (Romanian: Partidul Social-Democrat Tradițional, PDST).

=== August ===
- 28 August – Prime minister Nicolae Văcăroiu replaces 4 ministers of his cabinet.

=== September ===
- 15 September – The visit of Hungarian foreign minister Géza Jeszenszky in Romania starts.
- 16 September – Hungarian minister of foreign affairs Géza Jeszenszky and his Romanian counterpart, Teodor Meleșcanu, sign a treaty on the promotion and protection of investments and an agreement to avoid double tax imposition.
- 19 September – The visit of Hungarian foreign minister Géza Jeszenszky in Romania ends.

=== October ===
- 12 October – Virgil Măgureanu is named head of the Romanian Intelligence Service.
- 22 October – A bust of marshal Ion Antonescu is inaugurated in Slobozia. The inauguration of the statue was attended by Mihai Ungheanu, state secretary in the Ministry of Culture, and member of parliament Corneliu Vadim Tudor.

=== November ===
- 18 November – About 50,000 people march through Bucharest to protest the economic deterioration of Romania.
- 29 November – Romanian singer Ioan Luchian Mihalea is murdered.

== Births ==
- 17 August – Alexandru Albu, footballer.

== Deaths ==
- 14 September – Geo Bogza, Romanian poet, essayist, and journalist, titular member of the Romanian Academy (born 1908).
- 4 October – Dumitru Stăniloae, Romanian Orthodox priest and theologian, titular member of the Romanian Academy (born 1903).
- 18 December – Gheorghe Cozorici, actor (born 1933).
