= Pariu cu viața =

- Genre: Musical; Comedy drama Drama
- Starring: Alina Eremia; Dorian Popa; Adela Popescu; Radu Gabriel; Elvira Deatcu
- Opening theme: Avem același vis
- Ending theme: Am învățat să lupt (Season 1); Lala Love Song (Season 2); Dance Dance Dance (Season 3); One Wish (Season 4)
- Country of origin: Romania
- Original language: Romanian
- No. of seasons: 4
- No. of episodes: 57

Production
- Production locations: Bucharest, Romania
- Running time: 60 minutes

Original release
- Network: Pro TV
- Release: 12 September 2011 – 5 June 2013

Pariu cu viața is a Romanian musical phenomenon comedy-drama television series that has aired on Pro TV. It focuses on a love story between two teenagers with a big passion for music, their family connections and the life of a music group formed at their high school.

== Cast and characters ==
=== Main characters ===
- Ioana Popa (Alina Eremia) is a student at a high school in Bucharest, Colegiul National de Arte (the National College of Arts). Ioana discovers that her boyfriend, Andrei, placed a bet that he would date her. Being extremely disappointed, she decides to join a music group formed by a teacher, Raluca. The group is named Lala Band. Ioana knew that her parents are Tănțica Cercel and Gică Popa, but, during the first season, Ioana discovers that she and Andrei were switched at birth. Therefore, her real parents are Mara and Sandu Anghel. She has a sister, Anca Anghel, whom she donated a kidney because Anca had a kidney failure.
- Andrei Anghel (Dorian Popa) is Ioana's boyfriend and a student at the same high school. He placed a bet with his friend Cristi, at the beginning of the year, that he would date Ioana, but despite the bet he really falls in love with her. He was raised by Mara and Sandu Anghel, but his real parents are Tănțica Cercel and Gică Popa. He has a stepbrother, Rafael Cercel, and a sister, Gio Popa.
- Anca Anghel (Cristina Ciobănașu) is Ioana's sister and Vlad's girlfriend. She had a kidney failure, but she gets healed when Ioana donates her a kidney.
- Vlad Stănescu (Vlad Gherman) is Anca's boyfriend. He lost his parents. In the second season, he is adopted by Mara Anghel so he won't need to stay in an orphanage. In the past, he had a crush on Ioana.
- Sara Năstase (Sore Mihalache) is Cristi's girlfriend. At the beginning of the series, she likes Andrei and tries everything to make him break up with Ioana.
- Cristi Alexandrescu (Raphael Tudor) is Sara's boyfriend. At the beginning of the series, he is rich and lives alone because his parents are working abroad, but later he becomes poor and loses his house. He moves in with the other members of the band.
- Monica Bora (Alexia Talavutis) is Dima's wife. She and Dima were expecting a baby before graduating, but she loses the pregnancy. In the fourth season, they decide to try having a baby again.
- Dima Trofin (Dima Trofim) is Monica's husband. He had been Sara's boyfriend.
- Sofia Drăgulescu (Gloria Melu) was Bubu's girlfriend but they broke up when she left the country to study in the United States. Now, she is dating Rafael Cercel.
- Bubu Grama (Mihai Cernea) was in love with Sofia, but they broke up due to her wish to study abroad.
- Liviu Teodorescu (Liviu Teodorescu) is one of the newest members of Lala Band. He was a contestant at "Vocea Romaniei" ("The Voice of Romania"). At first, the other members of the group don't want him in the band and they call him ironically "Liviu de la Vocea" ("Liviu of The Voice"), but later he gets in the band. He falls in love with Ioana.
- Dana (Ana Baniciu) is one of the newest members of Lala Band. She is in love with Rafael and Răzvan, but she doesn't know which one to choose.
- Rafael Cercel (Levent Sali) is Tănţica's son. During the first two seasons, he is in love with Sara, but in the third season, he gets in a relationship with Sofia.
- Andrada Rizea (Andrada Popa) is Anca's best friend. At the beginning of the series, she and Anca were enemies.
- Jenel Frumosu (Gabriel Ciocan) is in love with Dana.
- Răzvan Oprea (Costin Cambir) is Raluca's protege. When his father tries to kill all the members of Lala Band only because he wants to get to Raluca, he kills his father in order to protect his friends.
- Bogdan Cristescu (Mihai Mititescu) was in love with Anca. He was a drug-addict.
- Gică Popa (Radu Gabriel) is Andrei and Gio's father, Rafael's stepfather and Tănţica's husband. He is a policeman.
- Constanţa "Tănţica" Cercel (Elvira Deatcu) is Andrei's stepmother, Rafael and Gio's mother and Gică's wife. She later becomes a policewoman.
- Mara Anghel (Carmen Tănase) is Ioana and Anca's mother. She was married to Sandu Anghel. She adopts Vlad and a little boy named Mihai.
- Raluca Dumitrescu (Adela Popescu) is the music theory teacher at "Colegiul National de Arte". She starts a modern music club at the high school and forms the Lala Band group. She gets engaged to Tudor, a sports teacher, and, in the fourth season, adopts a little girl named Mia.
- Silviu Crăciun (Marin Moraru) is Ioana and Anca's grandfather.
- Zâna Crăciun (Teo Trandafir) is Ioana and Anca's aunt.
- Tudor (Radu Valcan) is Raluca's fiancé and a sports teacher. With Raluca, he adopts a little girl named Mia.
- Robert Călin (Răzvan Fodor) is the new director of the school and Raluca's ex-boyfriend.
- Vasile Popa (Ion Ion) is Gică's brother. He is also a policeman.

=== Past characters ===
==== Seasons 1 - 2 ====
- Andreea Rădulescu (Diana Dumitrescu) is Rareș's girlfriend. She takes Rareș's place as an economy teacher after he gets fired.
- Johnny (Cătălin Cățoiu)
- Dumitru Dumitrescu (Dan Condurache) is Raluca's father. He is the former director of the high school.
- Diana Martin (Bianca Dragomir)
- Laura Moise (Monica Odagiu)
- Gio Popa (Georgiana Drumen) was Andrei and Rafael's sister. She was killed by an accident by Sandu Anghel.
- Ștefan Luca (Andrei Ștefan)
- Nadia Anastasiu (Oana Stancu)
- Bobby Iordache (Alexandru Papadopol) is one of the high school teachers.
- Alexandru "Sandu" Anghel (Doru Ana) is Ioana and Anca's father and Mara's ex-husband.
- Rareș (Costin Sforaru) is Zâna's son and Andreea's boyfriend. He is a former economy teacher.
- Dorina Anastasiu (Manuela Ciucur)
- Alexandra Anastasiu (Mădălina Drăghici)
- Olga Crăciun (Tatiana Iekel) is Ioana and Anca's grandmother
- Constantin Oprea (Ion Cincașciuc), is Răzvan's father
- Sanda Oprea (Catrinel Dumitrescu), is Răzvan's mother
- Minerva Dumitrescu (Luminița Gheorghiu), is Raluca's mother
- Traian Minea (Constantin Cotimanis)
- Sergiu Minea (Andrei Sever), is Traian's son
- Corina Minea (Eugenia Maci), is Traian's wife and Sergiu's mother
- Dragoslav (Gheorghe Visu)

== Awards ==
Year	Award
2012	Premiile TVMania - Cel mai bun serial românesc

== International broadcasts ==
Country	Title (adapted or not)	Channel
Bolivia	Apuestale a la Vida	Red ATB
Italy	Una scommessa con la vita	Babel TV
Mexico	Apuesta por la Vida	Tiin
Republic of Moldova	Pariu cu viața	Pro TV Chișinău
