= 1992 in Romania =

- Decades: 1970s; 1980s; 1990s; 2000s; 2010s
- See also: Other events of 1992; History of Romania; Timeline of Romanian history; Years in Romania

Events in the year 1992 in Romania.

== Incumbents ==
- President: Ion Iliescu
- Prime Minister: Theodor Stolojan (until November 18), Nicolae Văcăroiu (starting November 18)

== Events ==
=== Full date unknown ===
- The Romanian Cultural Institute (ICR) organizes summer courses in Romanian for language teachers.

== Politics ==
- 1992 Romanian local elections.

- 1992 Romanian general election.

== Births ==
- March 6 – Marian Fuchs, footballer.
- March 28 – Elena Bogdan, tennis player
- April 13 – Bogdan Barbu, footballer.
- June 21 – Mădălin Martin, professional footballer
- August 20 – Andrei Peteleu, professional footballer
- November 25 – Ana Bogdan, tennis player

== Deaths ==
- February 12 – Stella Roman (b. 1904), operatic soprano.
- February 24 – Ion Lăpușneanu (b. 1908), football goalkeeper.
- March 6 – Silviu Bindea (b. 1912), football player and coach.
- April 4 – Vintilă Horia (b. 1915), writer, winner of the Prix Goncourt.
- April 21 – Ioan Totu (b. 1931), economist and communist politician who served as Vice Prime Minister and as Minister of Foreign Affairs.
- May 22 – Iosif Varga (b. 1941), football player.
- June 2 – Alexandru Nicolschi (b. 1915), communist activist, Soviet agent and officer, and Securitate chief, with the rank of Lieutenant General.
- July 10 – Ion Bogdan (b. 1915), footballer.
- July 11 – Constantin Pîrvulescu (b. 1895), Romanian communist politician.
- August 24 – Lazăr Sfera (b. 1909), footballer.
