= 1991 in Romania =

- Decades: 1970s; 1980s; 1990s; 2000s; 2010s
- See also: Other events of 1991; History of Romania; Timeline of Romanian history; Years in Romania

This is a list of 1991 events that occurred in Romania.

== Incumbents ==
- President: Ion Iliescu
- Prime Minister: Petre Roman (until October 1), Theodor Stolojan (starting October 16)

== Events ==
=== February ===
- 11 February – Mircea Snegur, President of Moldavian SSR, makes first official visit to Romania.

=== April ===
- 20 April – The National Bank of Romania launches first post-revolutionary issue of banknotes, dedicated to sculptor Constantin Brâncuși, respectively the banknote of 500 lei.

=== June ===
- 24 June – The Romanian Parliament declares null the Molotov–Ribbentrop Pact of 23 August 1939.

=== July ===
- 1 July – The Warsaw Pact dissolves.
- 7 July – The Civic Alliance Party is established.

=== August ===
- 27 August – Romania is the first country to recognize Moldova's independence from the Soviet Union.

=== September ===
- 2 September: The Ukrainian-flagged vessel Rostock ran aground and sank in the Sulina branch of the Danube, near Partizani village, partially blocking traffic; the last piece of the wreck was brought to the surface 14 years later.
- 26 September – September 1991 Mineriad: The Jiu Valley miners return to Victory Square. Here take place negotiations with doors closed, between representatives of the miners and the country's leadership. The ensuing resignation of the second Petre Roman cabinet is announced at 12:30pm from the balcony of Victoria Palace. In the evening, the miners try to break into the headquarters of the Romanian Television. Here take place scenes of violence and vandalism.

=== October ===
- 16 October – Installation of the government led by Theodor Stolojan.

=== November ===
The 1991 Constitution of Romania.

- 21 November – The Constituent Assembly approves the new Constitution of Romania.

=== December ===
The results of the national referendum on the constitution.

- 8 December – Is adopted, through a national referendum, the new Constitution of Romania, approved by the Constituent Assembly on 21 November 1991; development, discussion and adoption of the Constitution lasted a year and a half.
- 12 December – Supreme Court of Justice, Department of Military, declares not guilty the former members of the Political Executive Committee of the Romanian Communist Party.

== Births ==
- 15 July – Narcis Bădic, footballer
- 27 September – Simona Halep, tennis player

== Deaths ==
- 21 January – Ileana of Romania, daughter of King Ferdinand I and Queen Marie (b. 1909)
- 6 March – Ion Pavel, diabetologist, member of the Romanian Academy and corresponding member of the Academy of Medicine in Paris (b. 1897)
- 6 May – Virgil Calotescu, director of documentary and fiction films (b. 1928)
- 21 May – Ioan Petru Culianu, historian of religions, writer and essayist (b. 1950)
- 3 July – Sigismund Toduță, composer, musicologist, teacher and corresponding member of the Romanian Academy (b. 1908)
- 9 August – Cella Delavrancea, pianist, writer and piano teacher (b. 1887)
- 21 August – Eugen Jebeleanu, academician, poet, publicist and translator (b. 1911)
- 3 September – Elvira Godeanu, actress (b. 1904)
- 9 September – Henri H. Stahl, sociologist, anthropologist, ethnographer, historian and member of the Romanian Academy (b. 1901)
- 28 October – Ilie G. Murgulescu, chemist, Minister for Higher Education (1953) and member of the Romanian Academy (b. 1902)
- 14 November – Constantin Chiriță, writer, novelist, scenarist, essayist and politician (b. 1925)
- 3 December – Petre Țuțea, essayist, philosopher, economist and communist politician (b. 1902)
- 6 December – Vladimir Colin, the most important Romanian writer of science fiction and fantasy (b. 1921)
- 27 December – Radu Budișteanu, lawyer and activist of the Iron Guard (b. 1902).
