= 1994 in Romania =

- Decades: 1970s; 1980s; 1990s; 2000s; 2010s
- See also: Other events of 1994; History of Romania; Timeline of Romanian history; Years in Romania

Events from the year 1994 in Romania.

== Incumbents ==
- President of Romania: Ion Iliescu
- Prime Minister of Romania: Nicolae Văcăroiu

== Events ==
- 5 April – President of Serbia Slobodan Milošević is welcomed on a formal visit to Romania by president Ion Iliescu.
- 24 April – The Crans Montana Forum ends after 4 days. Shimon Peres of Israel and Yasser Arafat of the Palestine Liberation Organization take part.
- 9-11 May – The president of Albania, Sali Berisha, arrives in Romania.
- 21-22 June – President of the Czech Republic, Václav Havel, arrives in Romania.
- 22 June – The presidents of Romania and the Czech Republic sign a mutual cooperation and friendship treaty.

== Deaths ==
- 3 January – Constantin Vișoianu jurist, diplomat, and politician (b. 1897).
- 9 February – Gherasim Luca, surrealist theorist and poet (b. 1913).
- 24 February – Ion Lăpușneanu, football goalkeeper (b. 1908).
- 9 March – Zoltán Beke, football player and coach (b. 1911).
- 28 March
  - Ștefan Gușă, general, Chief of the Romanian General Staff from 1986 to 1989 (b. 1940).
  - Eugène Ionesco, Romanian-French playwright (b. 1909).
- 4 April – Valentin Stănescu football goalkeeper and manager (b. 1922).
- 7 April – Ștefan Dobay, football player (b. 1909).
- 30 April – George Constantin, actor (b. 1933).
- 6 May – Moses Rosen, rabbi, Chief Rabbi of Romanian Jewry between 1948 and 1994 (b. 1912).
- 24 June – Bondoc Ionescu-Crum, athlete and football player and manager (b. 1915).
- 12 October – Manole Marcus film director and screenwriter (b. 1928).
- 30 October – Nicholas Georgescu-Roegen, mathematician, statistician, and economist (b. 1906).
- 25 November – Gheorghe Vitanidis, film director (b. 1929).
- 29 November – Titus Popovici, screenwriter and author (b. 1930).
