= 1988 in Romania =

- Decades: 1960s; 1970s; 1980s; 1990s; 2000s
- See also: Other events of 1988; History of Romania; Timeline of Romanian history; Years in Romania

Events from the year 1988 in the Socialist Republic of Romania.

== Incumbents ==
- President: Nicolae Ceaușescu
- Prime Minister: Constantin Dăscălescu

== Events ==
=== January ===
- 8 January:
  - President Nicolae Ceaușescu receives US senator Arlen Specter.
  - Romania confirms its participation at the 1988 Summer Olympics.
  - According to state news agency Agerpres, an earthquake hits the Vrancea area at 18:51 EET with an intensity of 5 degrees on the Richter magnitude scale, at a depth of 120 km. No casualties are reported.
- 26 January – Decree No. 11 (Romanian: Decretul nr. 11) is issued, through which some infractions are amnestied and the length of punishment for others is reduced.

=== February ===
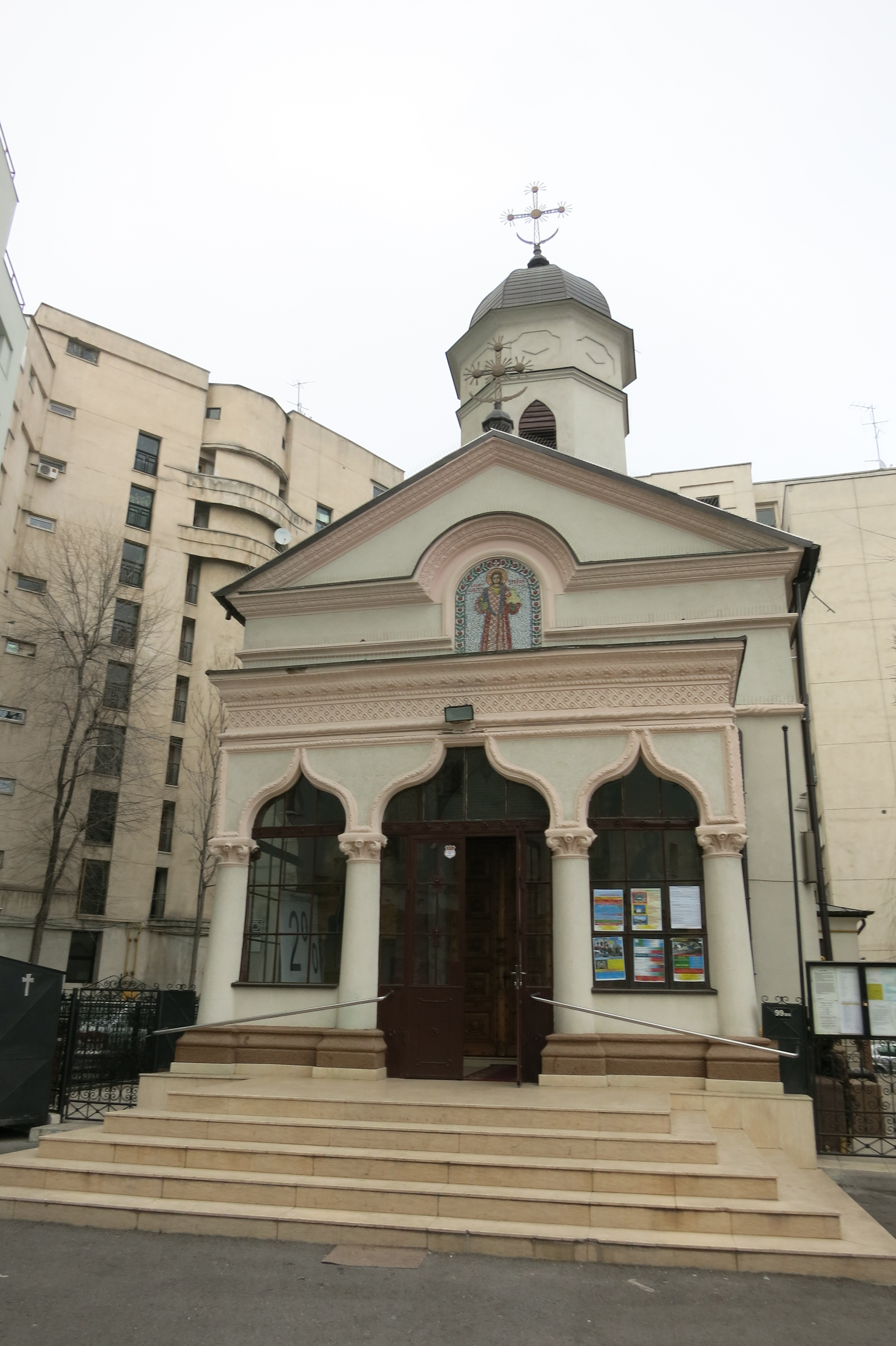
The Cuibul cu barză Church in 2014

- 3 February – Coen Stork starts being ambassador of the Netherlands to Bucharest.
- 22 February – The Cuibul cu barză Church is translated.

=== March ===
- 2 March – A match between Steaua and the Glasgow Rangers takes place in Bucharest, ending in a score of 2-0 for Steaua.

=== April ===
- 6 April – Steaua plays one of the semifinals of the 1987–88 European Cup against Benfica.

=== May ===
- 10-14 May – Chairman of the Presidium of the Supreme Soviet, Andrei Gromyko, visits Romania.

=== August ===
- 28 August – President Nicolae Ceaușescu meets with Hungarian prime minister Károly Grósz in Arad.

=== September ===
- 23 September – At 18:19 local time, an incendiary device is thrown on the grounds of the US consulate in Bucharest. No casualties or property damage are reported.

=== October ===
- 5 October – Steaua plays against Sparta Prague in Bucharest during the 1988–89 European Cup, ending in a 2–2 tie.
- 26 October – Steaua plays against Spartak Moscow.

== Births ==
=== January ===
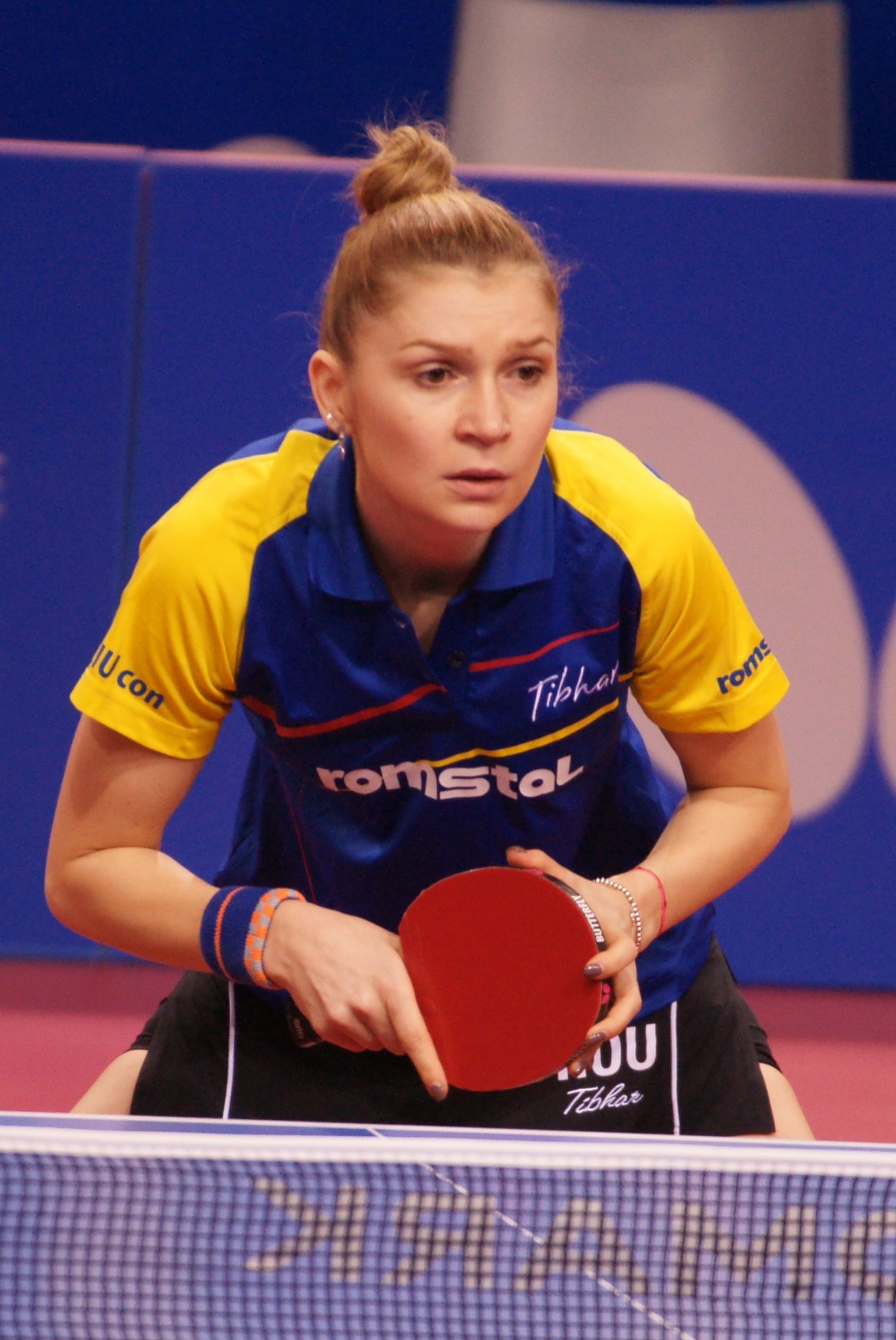
Daniela Dodean

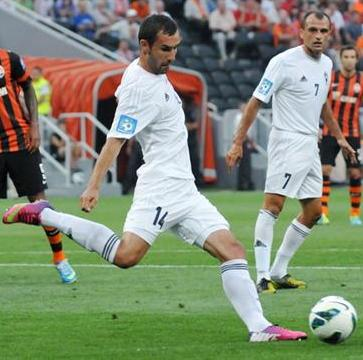
Alexandru Dandea

- 9 January – Monica Ungureanu, Romanian judoka.
- 13 January – Daniela Dodean, Romanian table tennis player.
- 23 January – Alexandru Dandea, Romanian footballer.

=== February ===
- 8 February – Norbert Trandafir, Romanian swimmer.

=== March ===
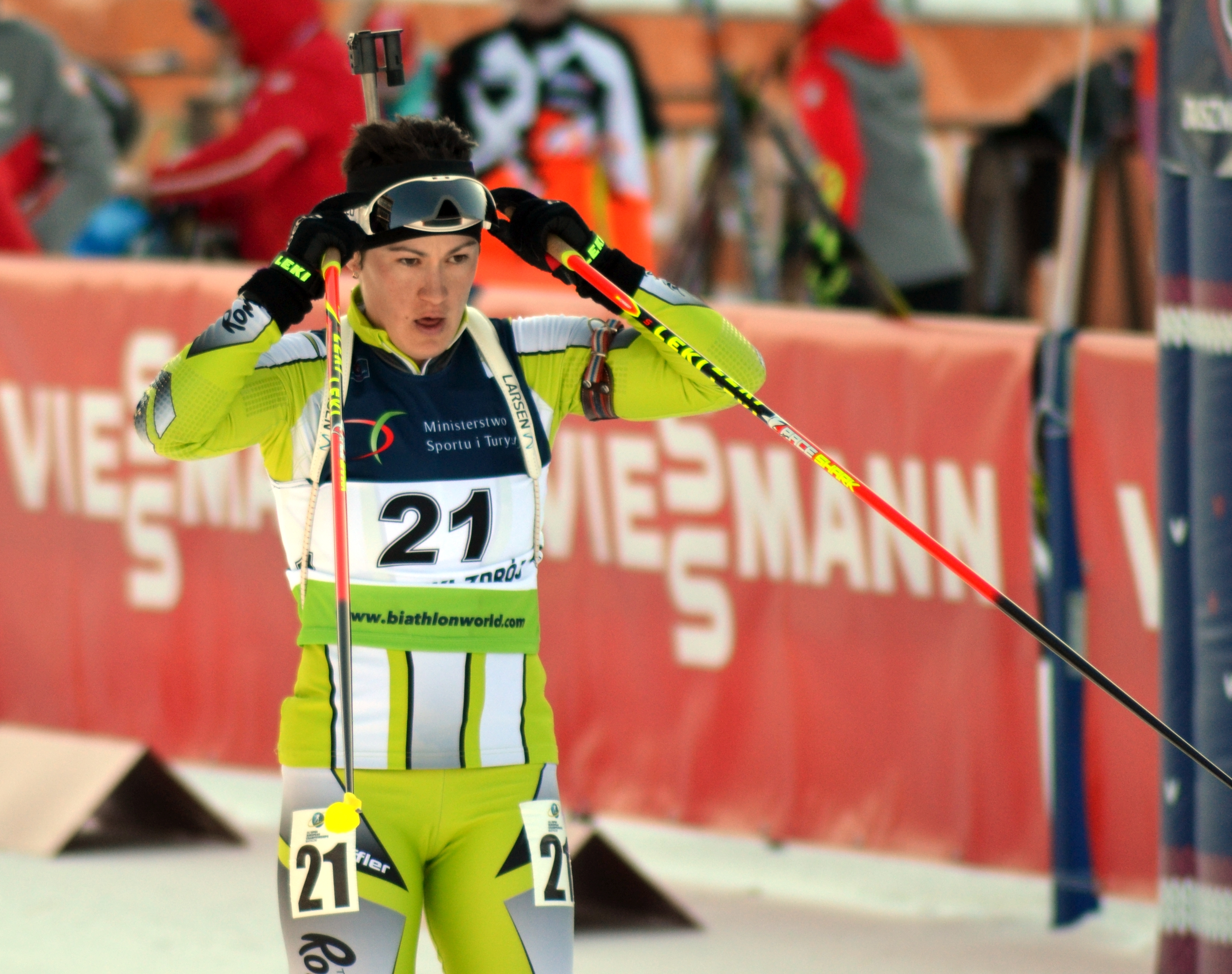
Luminița Pișcoran

- 14 March – Luminița Pișcoran, Romanian biathlete.

=== April ===
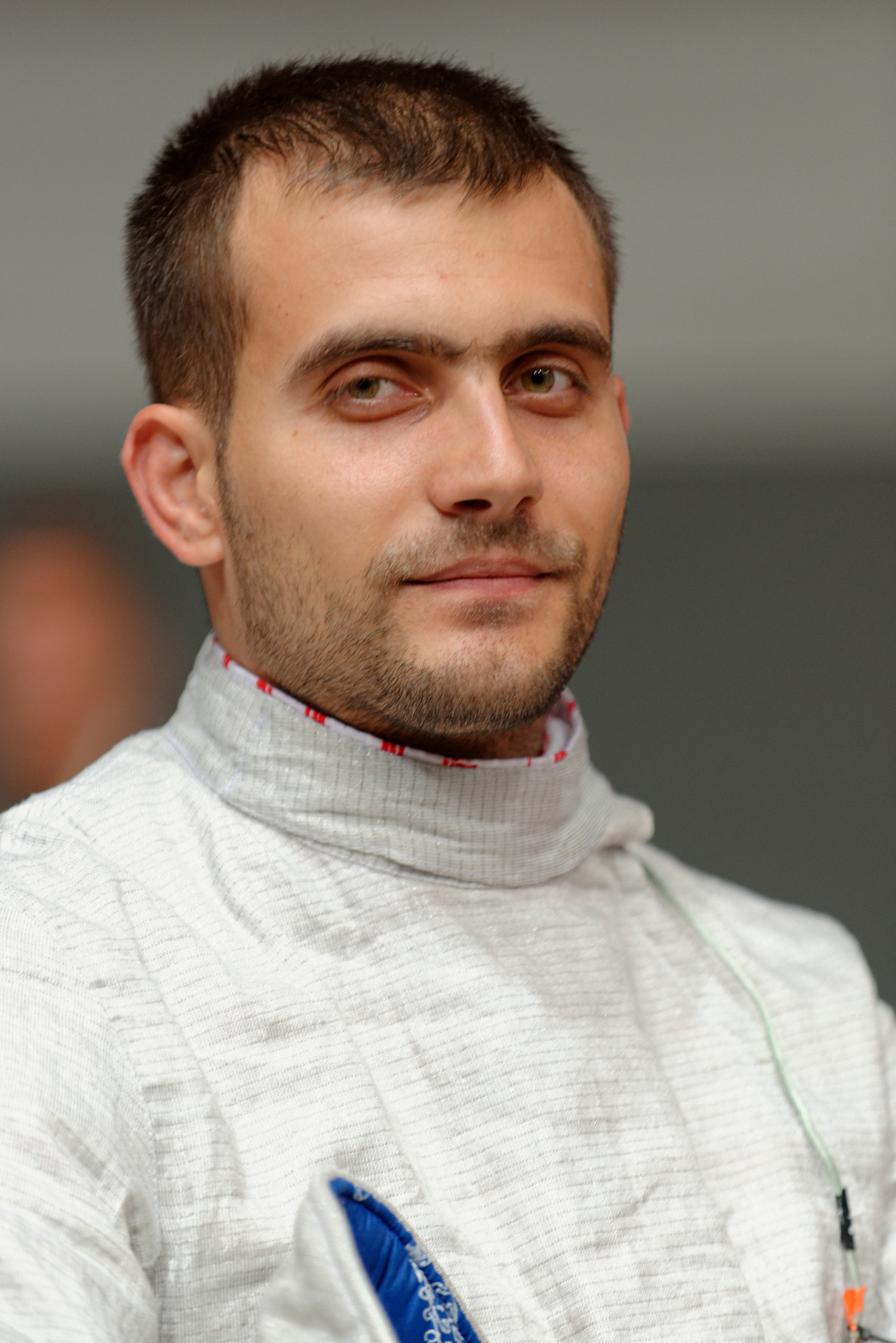
Tiberiu Dolniceanu

- 3 April – Tiberiu Dolniceanu, Romanian fencer.
- 12 April – Cristina Bujin, Romanian athlete.

=== May ===
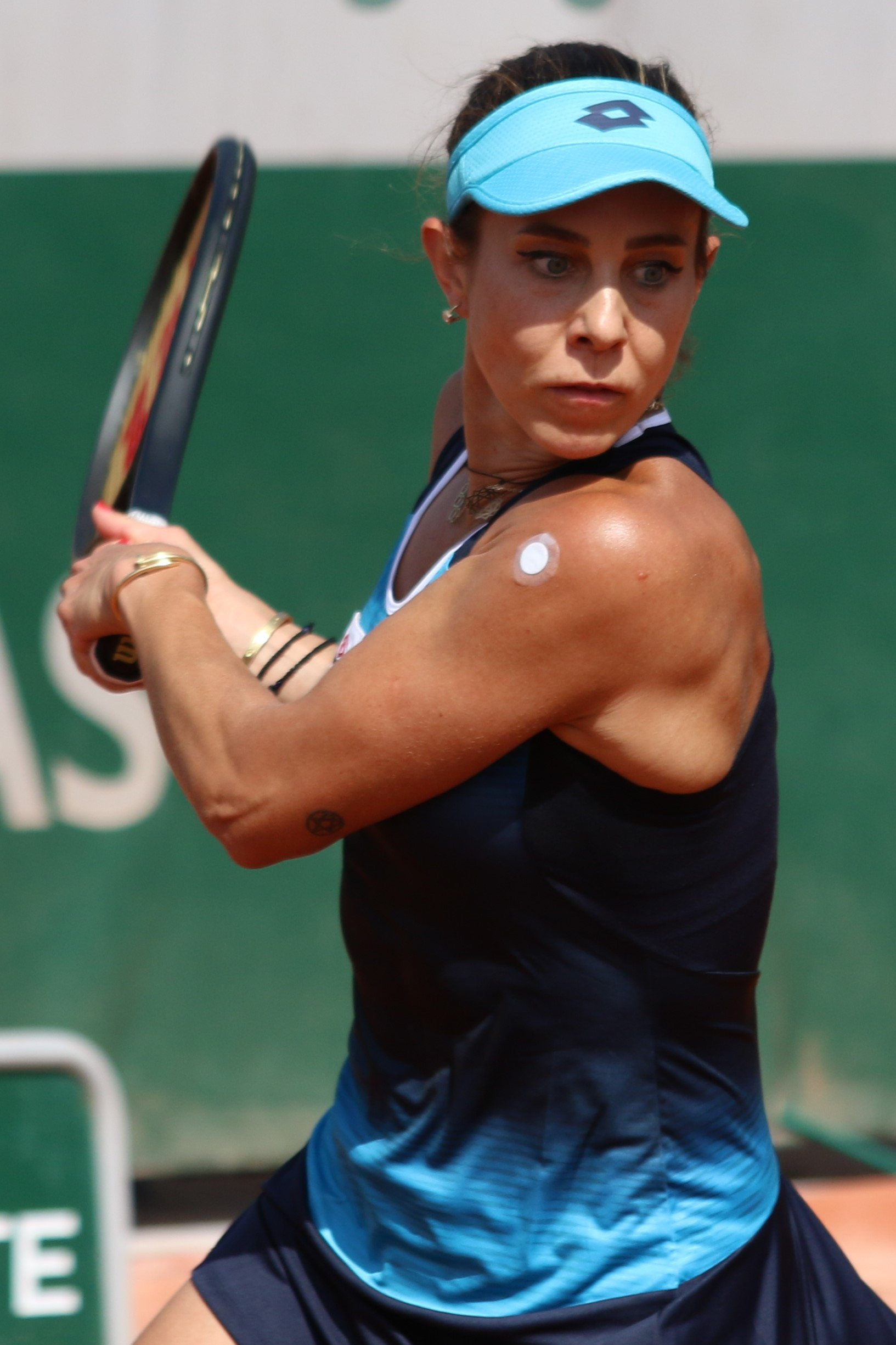
Mihaela Buzărnescu

- 4 May – Mihaela Buzărnescu, Romanian tennis player.

=== July ===
- 2 July – Ada Condeescu, Romanian actress.

== See also ==
- Romania at the 1988 Summer Olympics
- Romania at the 1988 Winter Olympics
