= February 1990 Mineriad =

- Part of the mineriads
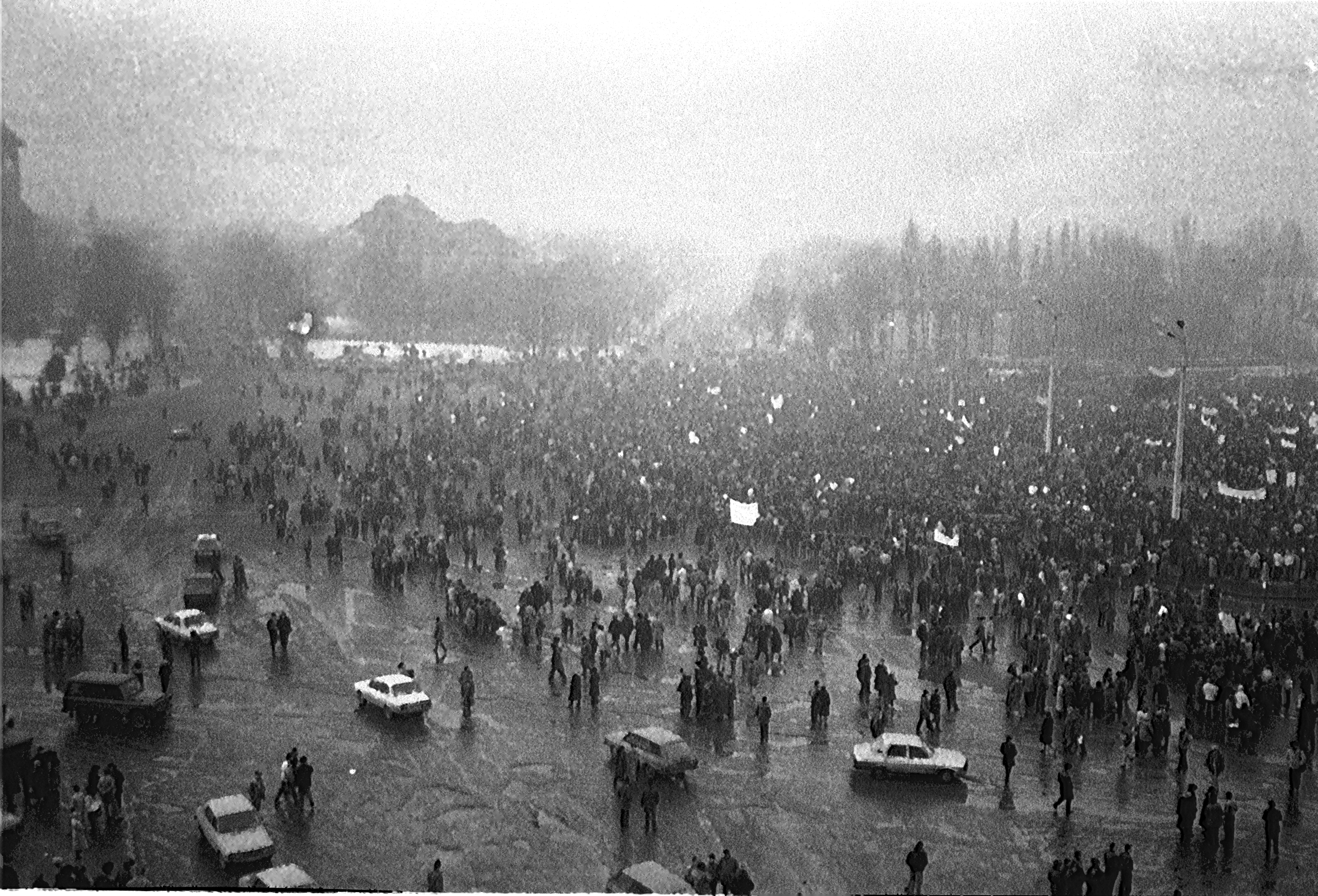
- Protest at the Victoria Palace in Bucharest
- Date: 18–19 February 1990

The February 1990 Mineriad was a mineriad that occurred in Bucharest, the capital of Romania. Although it was at first non-violent, the protests later escalated. This Mineriad happened 18–19 February, less than a month after the January 1990 Mineriad. Despite the demonstrators' pleas to non-violence, several persons started throwing stones into the Victoria Palace Government building. Riot police and army forces intervened to restore order, and on the same night, 4,000 miners headed to Bucharest. Opposition leaders and independent media speculated that the demonstration was manipulated by the Securitate and the National Salvation Front. Miners maintained their relative innocence of the violence, claiming that the agitation and most of the brutality was the work of Ion Iliescu's government agents who had infiltrated and disguised themselves as miners.
