= Alina Eremia =

Romanian singer (born 1993)

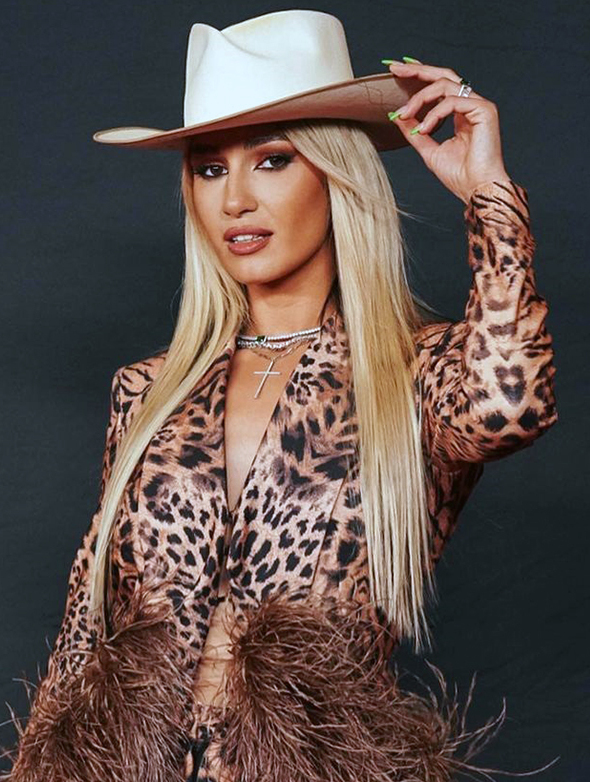
- Alina Eremia on the red carpet at The Artist Awards 2021.
- Born: 15 December 1993 (age 32); Buftea, Romania
- Education: School of Music and Arts, Bucharest
- Occupations: Singer; Television Presenter
- Years active: 1997–present
- Works: Discography
- Parents: Nicușor Eremia (father); Daniela Eremia (mother)
- Musical career
- Genre: Dance-pop
- Instruments: Vocals, Piano
- Labels: MediaPro Music; Universal Music Group; Global
- Formerly of: Lala Band
- Website: www.alinaeremia.ro

Alina Eremia (Romanian pronunciation: [aˈlina ereˈmi.a]; born 15 December 1993 in Buftea) is a Romanian singer, TV personality, and former member of the LaLa band, who represented Romania in the Junior Eurovision Song Contest 2005 with the song Țurai. She plays Ioana in the teenage sitcom series Pariu cu viața. From 2014, she participated at the Romanian version of Dancing with the stars on Antena 1 and she was in the jury of Next Star.

She also worked for Disney Romania as a voice actress, dubbing the singing voice of Pocahontas in Pocahontas (Romanian dubbing from 2008) and Pocahontas II: Journey to a New World (Romanian dubbing from 2009), and both speaking and singing voices of Belle in Beauty and the Beast, Beauty and the Beast: The Enchanted Christmas and Belle's Magical World (Romanian dubbing from 2010).

Alina was a member of Miracol for over six years. During that time, she studied piano at the School of Music and Fine Arts, Bucharest.

She is one of the most recognised singers of Romania and her song "It was a madness" was listed as one of the most popular songs of the year in 2015.

In 2016, Alina Eremia parodied her own song "A fost o nebunie" together with Andrei Ciobanu and Sergiu Floroaia.

== Discography ==
Studio albums

- 360 (2017)
- Déjà Vu (2021)

EP

- Show Must Go On (Live) (2021)
- Metamorphosis (2023)
- OH, NO! (2023)
- Radical din doi (2024)
- Antifragil (2024)

== Filmography ==
=== Film ===
Year	Title	Role	Notes
2008	Pocahontas	Pocahontas (voice for Romanian dubbing)	
2009	Pocahontas II: Journey to a New World	Pocahontas (voice for Romanian dubbing)	
2010	Beauty and the Beast	Belle (voice for Romanian dubbing)	
2010	Beauty and the Beast: The Enchanted Christmas	Belle (voice for Romanian dubbing)	
2010	Beauty and the Beast: Belle's Magical World	Belle (voice for Romanian dubbing)	
2012	Generația LaLa: De la serial la fenomen	Herself	TV movie documentary
2015	A Warrior's Tail	Savva (voice for Romanian dubbing)	
2018	Lara – Aribelle și mâna destinului	Sarah	

=== Television ===
Year	Title	Role	Notes
2005	Junior Eurovision Song Contest	Herself	TV special
2006	Junior Eurovision Song Contest	Herself	TV special
2011–2013	Pariu cu viața	Ioana Popa / Ioana Anghel	TV series broadcast by Pro TV
2013	Next Star	Herself as a coach	TV show broadcast by Antena 1
2014	Dancing with the Stars	Herself as a contestant	TV show broadcast by Antena 1
2014	O nouă viață	Ioana Anghel	TV series broadcast by Acasă TV
2015	Te cunosc de undeva!	Herself as a contestant	TV show broadcast by Antena 1
2016–2017	Next Star	Herself as a member of the jury	TV show broadcast by Antena 1
2021	Masked Singer România	Lady Panda	TV show broadcast by Pro TV
2022	One True Singer	Herself as a member of the jury	TV show broadcast by HBO Max

== Awards and nominations ==
List of awards and nominations received by Alina Eremia
Year	Award	Category	Recipient	Result	Ref.
2005	Golden Cross International Singing Festival	B	Alina Eremia	Won	
2009	RRA Awards	Radio România Junior Award	Alina Eremia	Won	
2018	RRA Awards	The best female voice	Alina Eremia	Nominated	
2019	Muz-TV Music Award	Best Foreign Language Song	"Love & Lover" (Leonid Rudenko featuring Alina Eremia and Dominique Young Unique)	Nominated	

Awards and achievements
Preceded by Noni Răzvan Ene with "Îţi mulţumesc"	Romania in the Junior Eurovision Song Contest; 2005	Succeeded by New Star Music with "Povestea mea"
