= Dima Trofim =

- Also known as: Dima Trofim
- Born: Dumitru Gheorghiță Trofim; 14 January 1989 (age 37); Chișinău, Moldova, Soviet Union
- Genres: Pop, folk
- Occupations: Singer, actor and dancer
- Instrument: Voice
- Years active: 2011–present
- Formerly of: Lala Band

Dima Trofim (born 14 January 1989 in Chișinău, Moldova), is a Romanian singer, dancer, actor, and former member of the LaLa band.

He is known for his role as Dima Trofin in the TV series Pariu cu viața. He participated in the show Dansez pentru tine and in 2008–2009 at Stars Factory 1st edition, Moldova (in Romanian 'Fabrica de Staruri editia 1, R. Moldova'), he was among the finalists. Then he moved from Moldova to Romania.

In 2017, he auditioned for season 7 of The Voice of Romania singing "Fairytale" from Alexander Rybak. Two of the four judges, Loredana Groza and Smiley turned their chair. Trofim chose to be on Team Smiley.

== Discography ==
=== Singles ===
- Angel (2012)
- Cerșesc Iubire (2014)
- Stai Cu Mine (2014)
- Cireș De Mai feat. Amna (2016)
- Urzici (2017)
- Du-mă Unde Vrei feat. What's UP (2021)

== Filmography ==
=== Television series ===
Year	Title	Role	Network
2011–2013	Pariu cu viața	Himself	Pro TV
2014	O Noua viață	Himself	Acasă

=== TV shows ===
Year	Title	Network	Notes
2013	Dansez pentru tine – Season 14	Pro TV	Contestant
2015	Ferma vedetelor – Season 1	Pro TV	Contestant
2016	Te cunosc de undeva! – Season 10	Antena 1	Contestant
2017	Vocea României – Season 7	Pro TV	Contestant
