= Te cunosc de undeva! =

- Created by: Banijay Entertainment
- Presented by: Alina Pușcaș (1-prezent); Cosmin Seleși (1-16); Pepe (17-21)
- Judges: Andrei Aradits (1-12); Cristi Iacob (13-20); Andreea Bălan (1-4, 6-20); Mihai Petre (19-present); Ilona Brezoianu (21-present); Ozana Barabancea (1-4, 6-present); Aurelian Temişan (1-4, 6-present); Monica Anghel (5); Pepe (5); Horia Brenciu (5, ep. 7-14); Delia Matache (5, ep. 1-6)
- Country of origin: Romania
- Original language: Romanian
- No. of series: 21

Production
- Producer: Antena Group
- Production locations: Bucharest, Romania
- Running time: 120 mins

Original release
- Network: Antena 1
- Release: 17 March 2012 – present

Te cunosc de undeva! (translation: I know you from somewhere!) is the Romanian version of the talent show, Your Face Sounds Familiar. The first series premiered on 17 March 2012 on Antena 1. The show is hosted by Alina Pușcaș. Its panel of judges includes Ozana Barabancea, Aurelian Temișan, Mihai Petre and Ilona Brezoianu.

== Format ==
The show challenges celebrities to perform as different musical artists every week, which are chosen by its "Randomiser", and they are judged by a celebrity panel. Each celebrity performs a song-and-dance routine associated with a particular singer. The randomiser can choose an older or younger artist, one of the opposite sex (except during week one) or a deceased singer.

=== Voting ===
Contestants are awarded points from the judges (and each another) based on their singing and dancing. Each public vote triggers donations to eight charities.

Judges award points (up to 12 each, for a possible grand total of 48) to the contestants, who have five points to give to a contestant of their choice. These bonus points are awarded after all the contestants have performed. The total score of each contestant is the sum of the judges' and contestants' votes and the televotes. The winning contestant at the end of the each show receives €1000 to donate to a charity of their choice, and a €15,000 grand prize is awarded to the series champion in the final week.

== Contestants ==
Forty-one contestants have competed. Two have competed in two seasons, five in three seasons, and Maria Buză in four.

Italicized contestants have participated in the most-recent season.

Color key:

Winner
Runner-up
Third place
Fourth place (qualified for the final)
Fourth place (did not qualify)
First elimination of the season

Celebrity	Seasons						
Celebrity	1	2	3	4	5	6	7
Adrian Enache		3rd					
AlbNegru							3rd
Alex Maţaev					5th		
Alex Velea					Won		
Alina Eremia							2nd
Anda Adam			8th	4th		7th	
Andreea Banică					3rd		
Andrei Ștefănescu			7th				
Bambi							5th
Cezar Ouatu							Won
Claudia		6th					
CRBL	Won	5th				6th	
Dalma Kovács				5th			
Daniel Iordăchioaie							4th
Dan Helciug	5th						
Delia Matache	3rd						
Doru Todoruț					2nd		
Elena Ionescu					7th		
Ellie White				6th			
Florin Ristei					2nd	5th	
Iulian Vasile	8th						
Jean de la Craiova				3rd			
Jo			5th				
Jorge	4th	Won				3rd	
Julia Jianu	7th						
Lavinia Pârvă		7th					
Lidia Buble							8th
Lora	2nd	2nd				4th	
Maria Buză	6th	4th		2nd		Won	
Marian Niculae		8th					
Matteo				8th			
Mike Diamondz				7th			
Nicole Cherry					6th		
Pepe			Won	Won		2nd	
Raluka					4th		
Rona Hartner			4th			3rd	
Simona Nae			2nd				
Sonny Flame			6th				
Şerban Copoţ			3rd				

- CRBL, Maria Buză, Jorge and Lora returned for season two.
- Anda Adam, Pepe and Maria Buză returned for season four.

== Season results ==
Season	Premiere	Finale	Winner	Runner(s)-up	Hosts
1	17 March 2012	26 May 2012	CRBL	Lora	Alina Pușcaș, Cosmin Seleși
2	15 September 2012	1 December 2012	Jorge	Lora	Alina Pușcaș, Cosmin Seleși
3	16 February 2013	11 May 2013	Pepe	Simona Nae	Alina Pușcaș, Cosmin Seleși
4	7 September 2013	11 December 2013	Pepe	Maria Buză	Alina Pușcaș, Cosmin Seleși
5	15 February 2014	17 May 2014	Alex Velea	Doru Todoruț, Florin Ristei	Alina Pușcaș, Cosmin Seleși
6 (All-stars)	13 September 2014	20 December 2014	Maria Buză	Pepe	Alina Pușcaș, Cosmin Seleși
7	14 February 2015	16 May 2015	Cezar Ouatu	Alina Eremia	Alina Pușcaș, Cosmin Seleși
8	12 September 2015	26 December 2015	Florin Ristei	Șerban Copoț	Alina Pușcaș, Cosmin Seleși
9	13 February 2016	28 May 2016	Liviu Teodorescu	Liviu Vârciu, Andrei Ștefănescu	Alina Pușcaș, Cosmin Seleși
10	11 September 2016	24 December 2016	Șerban Copoț	Adina Răducan	Alina Pușcaș, Cosmin Seleși
11	18 February 2017	3 June 2017	Liviu Vârciu, Andrei Ștefănescu	Sore	Alina Pușcaș, Cosmin Seleși
12	9 September 2017	16 December 2017	Alin Pascal	Cezar Ouatu	Alina Pușcaș, Cosmin Seleși
13	8 September 2018	15 December 2018	Barbara Islai	Mihai Tristariu	Alina Pușcaș, Cosmin Seleși
14	7 September 2019	21 December 2019	Bella Santiago	Șerban Copoț, Cezar Ouatu	Alina Pușcaș, Cosmin Seleși
15	12 September 2020	19 December 2020	Ami	Adriana Trandafir, Romică Țociu	Alina Pușcaș, Cosmin Seleși
16	6 February 2021	15 May 2021	Adriana Trandafir, Romică Țociu	Pepe	Alina Pușcaș, Cosmin Seleși
17	30 April 2022	9 July 2022	Emi, Cuza	Ilona Brezoianu, Florin Ristei	Alina Pușcaș, Pepe
18	10 September 2022	17 December 2022	WRS, Emilian	Liviu Teodorescu, JO	Alina Pușcaș, Pepe
19	1 April 2023	24 June 2023	WRS, Emilian	CRBL, Radu Țibulică	Alina Pușcaș, Pepe
20	17 February 2024	25 May 2024	Florin Ristei, Ilona Brezoianu	Connect-R, Shift	Alina Pușcaș, Pepe
21	15 February 2025	24 May 2025	Mark Stam, Cristian Porcari	Cristina Ciobănașu, Bianca Purcărea	

== Overview ==
=== Season one (2012) ===
The show debuted on 17 March 2012 and ended on 26 May. Judges were pop singer Aurelian Temișan, singer and dancer Andreea Bălan, soprano Ozana Barabancea and actor Andrei Aradits. The winner was singer-dancer CRBL, who defeated Lora in the final. CRBL received a cheque for €15,000.

=== Season two (2012) ===
The second season began on 15 September 2012 and ended on 1 December, with all four judges returning. The winner was singer, dancer and television presenter Jorge, who received a cheque for €15,000. Lora was runner-up for the second time.

=== Season three (2013) ===
The third season began on 16 February 2013 and ended on 11 May, with all four judges returning. The winner was singer and TV host Pepe, who received a cheque for €15,000. Simona Nae was the runner-up.

=== Season four (2013) ===
The series' fourth season began on 7 September 2013, with all four judges returning. The winner was again Pepe, with Maria Buză the runner-up.

=== Season five (2014) ===
The fifth season began in 2014, and the judges were Andrei Aradits, Monica Anghel, Pepe and Delia. New contestants were Nicole Cherry, Raluka, Andreea Bănică, Elena Ionescu, Alex Mațaev, Doru Todoruț, Florin Ristei and Alex Velea. During the season Delia changed places with Horia Brenciu, and the season winner was Alex Velea.

=== Season six: All-Stars (2014) ===
The sixth season began on 13 September 2014, with the original judges returning by popular demand. For the All-Star season, contestants were chosen for their previous performances. They were: CRBL, Lora, Pepe, Maria Buză, Florin Ristei, Rona Hartner, Jorge and Anda Adam. Five contestants, instead of the usual four, appeared in the final: Jorge, Lora, Pepe, Maria Buză and Rona Hartner. The winner of the all-star season was Maria Buză.

=== Season seven (2015) ===
The seventh season started on 14 February 2015 with the same judges and hosts. There were nine new contestants and one returning player: soloists Oana Sârbu, Alina Eremia, Lidia Buble, Cezar Ouatu, Daniel Iordăchioaie, Liviu Vârciu and the groups Bambi (Raluca and Denisa Tănase) and Alb-Negru (Andrei Ștefănescu and Kamara). The winner was the opera singer Cezar Ouatu, and pop singer Alina Eremia was the runner-up.

== Hosts and judges ==
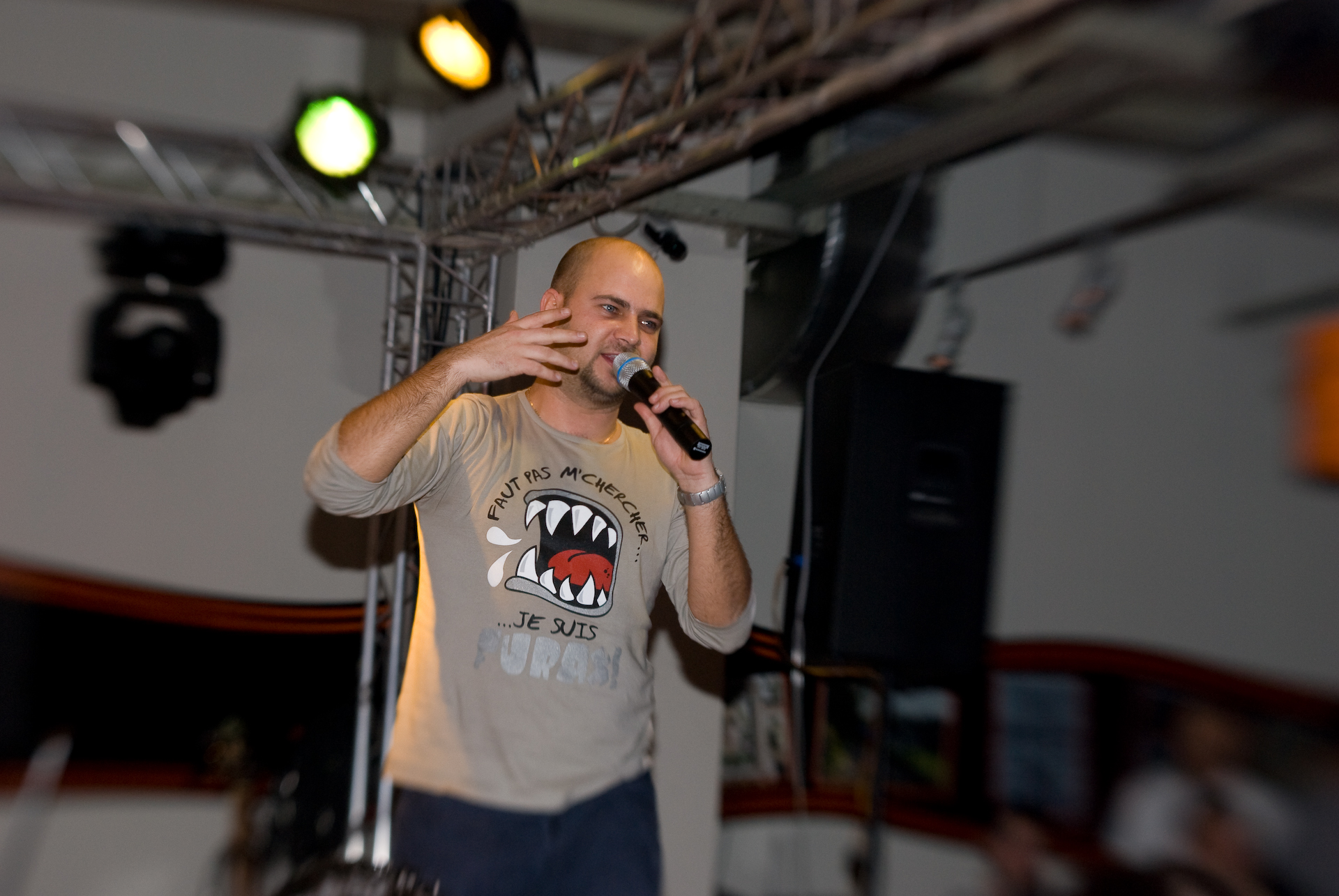
Cosmin Seleși

On 16 March 2012, actor and television presenter Cosmin Seleși and actress-model Alina Pușcaș were confirmed as hosts for the first season; they are known for their humor and spontaneity. Singer Aurelian Temișan, dancer Andreea Bălan, soprano Ozana Barabancea and actor Andrei Aradits were confirmed as judges. In season five, Bălan, Barabancea and Temișan changed places with Pepe, Monica Anghel and Delia. Before Season 17, however, Cosmin Seleși ended his contract with the Antena Group and therefore gave his place as presenter of Te Cunosc de Undeva to Pepe. After Season 21, however, Pepe ended his contract with the Antena Group and therefore leaves Te Cunosc de Undeva in 2026.

== Awards and nominee ==
For three consecutive years, from 2012 to 2014, TV Mania gave Te cunosc de undeva! its award for best entertainment show.
