= Paul Dimo =

Paul Dimo (10 June 1905 – 17 April 1990) was a Romanian electrical engineer, creator of REI method of nodal analysis of electric networks. He contributed also to the development of electrification Plan of Romania.

== Biography ==
Born in Turnu Severin, he studied electricity in Paris. Between 1930 and 1945 he was Head of Gas and Electricity Society in Bucharest. Then he worked as a researcher in the Institute of Energy Engineering of the Romanian Academy.

== Awards ==
- State prize for the Electrification Plan of Romania (1950) and for the design of hydroelectric power station Moroieni (1954)
- Montefiore award for electric networks analysis
- Traian Vuia prize of the Romanian Acadedemy for steady stability analysis of electric networks
