= Constantin Dinculescu =

Romanian energy engineer and educator

Constantin N. Dinculescu (November 23, 1898, Alexandria, Romania – September 15, 1990) was a Romanian energy engineer and educator.

Dinculescu designed the electrification of the Bucharest-Brașov railway for Căile Ferate Române, implemented between 1959 and 1966. Serving as rector of the Polytechnic University of Bucharest between August 1954 and January 1956, and then between December 1956 and April 1968, he contributed to the development of energy engineering education in Romania, introducing a nuclear energy engineering discipline to the curriculum.

He was awarded the Order of Labor in 1963. He became a corresponding member of the Romanian Academy in March 1952, advancing to titular member in January 1990, after the Romanian Revolution.
