= Ruby (Romanian singer) =

Romanian singer (born 1989)

- Born: 28 January 1989 (age 37)
- Origin: Medgidia, Romania
- Genres: Pop; dance music
- Occupation: Singer
- Years active: 2010–present
- Labels: Cat Music, HaHaHa Production, Golden Boy Society

Ana Claudia Grigore (born 28 January 1989) better known by her stage name Ruby is a Romanian dance-pop singer.

== Career ==
Ruby was born in Medgidia on 28 January 1989. She graduated from the "Dinu Lipatti" Music High School, specializing in acting. Her first step in the music field was in a club in Germany, where she held her first concert, thus becoming the first Romanian performer to debut abroad.

Her debut single, a club music track titled "Touch Me" in 2010, enjoyed success in Turkey. The song "Touch Me" was nominated for the 2011 British Online Music Awards in the "Best Dance Act" category. In the same year, Ruby released her second single, "Get High", in collaboration with Spanish singer Juan Magan.

In February 2011, Ruby began collaborating with HaHaHa Production, releasing the track "Party Hard." At the beginning of 2012, she released another single titled "Miracle of Love." The song was accompanied by a music video directed by Iulian Moga and entered the national Romanian Top 100 chart, peaking at number 31.

In September 2012, Ruby became very popular in Romania with the release of her first single in Romanian "Stinge lumina" (Turn Off the Lights), produced by Alex Velea and HaHaHa Production. A music video directed by Radu Aldea was released alongside the song. The single remains Ruby's most successful single in Romania to date, quickly reaching its peak position of number 18. An English version of the song, also titled "Turn Off the Lights", was released, along with another music video, also directed by Aldea.

== Discography ==
Yer	Single	Top	Album	Note
Yer	Single	RO	Album	Note
2010	"Get High"	—	N/A	
2011	"Party Hard"	—	N/A	
2011	"Touch Me"	—	N/A	
2012	"Change The World"	—	N/A	
2012	"Miracle Of Love"	31	N/A	
2012	"Stinge Lumina"	9	N/A	
2012	"Turn Off The Lights"	—	N/A	
2013	"1001 De Nopți"	—	N/A	
2013	"Toată Țara" (CRBL feat. Ruby)	49	N/A	
2013	"Băiat De Bani Gata" (feat. Pacha Man)	25	N/A	
2013	"Două Suflete"	83	N/A	
2014	"De La Distanță"	22	N/A	
2014	"Înghețată" (Yogi feat. Ruby & Shift)	—	N/A	
2014	"Tu (Inimă Și Sufletul)"	27	N/A	
2014	"Do It" (Claydee feat. Ruby)	—	N/A	
2015	"Nu Pune La Suflet" (feat. What's Up)	—	N/A	
2015	"Lasă Cucu-n Pace" (feat. Cătălin Moroșanu & Dorian Popa)	29	N/A	
2015	"Bună, Ce Mai Zici?" (feat. Dorian Popa)	1	N/A	
2016	"Tată"	—	N/A	
2016	"Urcă Și Coboară" (Shift feat. Ruby)	—	Adevărul	
2016	"Nana" (Voltaj feat. Ruby & Colin)	—	N/A	
2016	"Condimente" (Nosfe feat. Ruby)	—	N/A	
2016	"Nu Caut Iubiri" (feat. Uzzi)	—	N/A	
2017	"Sare Pe Rană" (Dorian Popa feat. Ruby)	—	N/A	
2017	"Luptătoare"	—	N/A	
2017	"Soare Pătrat"	—	N/A	
2017	"Adevăr sau Minciună”	—	N/A	
2017	"Îți mulțumesc” (A.U. feat. Ruby)	—	N/A	
2017	"A Mea” (What's Up feat. Ruby)	—	N/A	
2018	"Muzica de Bagabonți” (Shift feat Ruby & Criss Blaziny)	—	Minciuna	
2018	"Rochia mea”	—	N/A	
2018	"Drama" (Matteo feat Ruby)	—	N/A	
2018	"Invizibil” (feat. Shift)	—	N/A	
2019	"Toarna”	—	N/A	
2019	"Costa”	—	N/A	
2020	"Pe unde-ti umbla inima”	—	N/A	
2020	"Suavemente”	—	N/A	
2020	"Rapido” (feat. Florin Salam & Costi Ioniță)	—	N/A	
2020	"Limonada” (feat. Shift)	—	N/A	
2020	"PAPI” (Nosfe feat. Ruby)	—	Brazil	
2020	"Nimic" (Nane feat. Ruby)		Nanalien (Deluxe Edition)	
2020	"Secret de Dormitor” (Jador feat. Ruby)	—	N/A	
2020	"Unde” (feat. Emilian)	—	N/A	
2020	"Honey” (Horace feat. Ruby)	—	N/A	
2021	"Dale Gas” (The JointVenture feat. Ruby, Lennis Rodriguez, Hyemin)	—	N/A	
2021	"Bossy” (Juan Magan feat. Ruby, Florin Salam, Betty Blue & Costi Ioniță)	—	N/A	
2021	"Te Sun Yo”	—	N/A	
2021	"Sevraj” (Felix feat. Ruby)	—	N/A	
2021	"Ne certăm” (feat. Lino Golden)	—	N/A	
2022	"Carrusel” (Yasiris feat. Ruby)	—	N/A	
2022	"Maria” (DJ Sava feat Ruby)	—	N/A	
2022	"Pericol Public”	—	N/A	
2022	"Oye Como Va” (DJ Sava feat Ruby)	—	N/A	
2022	"Soare” (Jo feat. Ruby)	—	N/A	
2022	"Viciu între vicii” (feat. Alex Velea)	—	N/A	
2022	"Mișcă c*ru” (Amuly feat. Ruby)	—	Portal	
2023	"Paris”	—	N/A	
