= January 1990 Mineriad =

- Part of the mineriads
- Date: 28–29 January 1990

The January 1990 Mineriad was the first of the six mineriads that occurred in Romania. It started after a protest in the Victory Square of Bucharest was carried out on 28 January 1990 by Romanians of all ages, backgrounds and places of the country against the National Salvation Front (FSN) after it announced it would participate in the next Romanian election although it promised not to do so. The next day, 5,000 miners from the Jiu Valley came to Bucharest and demanded better working conditions. However, the miners and the anti-FSN protesters were repressed, causing dozens of injuries.
