= Lala Band =

Romanian pop-rock band

- Origin: Bucharest, Romania
- Genres: Pop-rock; pop; rock; dance
- Years active: 2011–2014
- Labels: MediaPro Music
- Past members: Dorian Popa; Alina Eremia; Cristina Ciobănașu; Vlad Gherman; Sore Mihalache; Rapha Tudor; Alexia Talavutis; Dima Trofim; Bubu Cernea; Ana Baniciu; Alex Nicolae; Gabriel Ciocan; Costin Cambir; Bianca Dragomir; Georgiana Drumen; Gloria Melu; Mihai Mițitescu; Monica Odagiu; Andrada Popa; Levent Sali; Oana Stancu; Andrei Ștefan; Liviu Teodorescu
- Website: lalaband.protv.ro

Lala Band (stylized as LaLa Band) were a Romanian pop-rock band formed by MediaPro Music in Bucharest in 2011. The group was formed through a casting system held by MediaPro Music in February 2011 and 21 people were chosen to form Lala Band.

Lala Band debuted, at the same time when their TV series, Pariu cu viața, premiered on 12 September 2011, on Pro TV. After Pariu cu viața ended on 12 June 2013, a spin-off series was made as O nouă viață, which has aired on Acasă, from 17 February to 17 April 2014.

The group went successful in 2011, 2012 and 2013. The group disbanded shortly after O nouă viață ended. At the time of the disbandment, it only consisted of 12 members, who are Dorian Popa, Alina Eremia, Cristina Ciobănașu, Vlad Gherman, Sore Mihalache, Raphael Tudor, Alexia Talavutis, Dima Trofim, Bubu Cernea, Gabriel Ciocan, Ana Banciu and Alex Nicolae.

== Members ==
=== Final members ===
- Dorian Popa (2011–2014)
- Alina Eremia (2011–2014)
- Cristina Ciobănașu (2011–2014)
- Vlad Gherman (2011–2014)
- Sore Mihalache (2011–2014)
- Rapha Tudor (2011–2014)
- Alexia Talavutis (2011–2014)
- Dima Trofim (2011–2014)
- Bubu Cernea (2011–2014)
- Gabriel Ciocan (2011–2014)
- Ana Baniciu (2012–2014)
- Alex Nicolae (2013–2014)

=== Former members ===
- Oana Stancu (2011–2012)
- Bianca Dragomir (2011–2012)
- Georgiana Drumen (2011–2012)
- Monica Odagiu (2011–2012)
- Andrei Ștefan (2011–2012)
- Costin Cambir (2011–2013)
- Gloria Melu (2011–2013)
- Mihai Mițitescu (2011–2013)
- Andrada Popa (2011–2013)
- Levent Sali (2011–2013)
- Liviu Teodorescu (2012–2013)

Timeline

== Discography ==
=== Studio albums ===
| Title | Album details |
|---|---|
| Lala Xmas Songs | Released: 10 December 2011; Label: MediaPro Music; Format: CD, Digital Download |
| Lala Love Songs | Released: 11 March 2012; Label: MediaPro Music; Format: CD, DD |
| Lala Summer Love/Lala Love Stories | Released: 21 June 2012; Label: MediaPro Music; Format: CD, DD |
| Lala Dance/Lala Love Stories 2 | Released: 20 November 2012; Label: MediaPro Music; Format: CD, DD |
| Lala Love Forever | Released: 1 June 2013; Label: MediaPro Music; Format: CD, DD |

=== Singles ===
| Title | Year | Album |
|---|---|---|
| Stage of Joy | 2011 | Lala Love Songs |
| Lala Love Song | 2011 | Lala Love Songs |
| Avem același vis | 2011 | Lala Love Songs |
| Am învățat să lupt | 2011 | Lala Love Songs |
| Who Cares? | 2011 | Lala Love Songs |
| My Real Love | 2011 | Lala Love Songs |
| Hey You | 2012 | Lala Summer Love/Lala Love Stories |
| Dance Dance Dance | 2012 | Lala Dance/Lala Love Stories 2 |
| One Wish | 2013 | Lala Love Forever |

== Filmography ==
- Pariu cu viața (2011–2013)
- O nouă viață (2014)

== Awards ==
| Year | Award |
|---|---|
| 2013 | Romanian Music Awards, Teen Icon Award |
| 2013 | Media Music Awards, Fans Like Award |
