= Octavian Ionescu (footballer, born 1990) =

Romanian footballer

Personal information
- Full name: Octavian Mihail Ionescu
- Date of birth: 15 March 1990 (age 36)
- Place of birth: Târgoviște, Romania
- Height: 1.81 m (5 ft 11 in)
- Position: Defender

Youth career
- FCM Târgoviște

Senior career*
Years	Team	Apps	(Gls)
2008–2010	Rapid II București		
2011–2012	Girom Albota		
2011	→ Argeș Pitești (loan)	14	(1)
2012–2013	Gloria Bistrița	8	(0)
2013–2014	SCM Pitești		
2014–2015	Afumați		
Total		22	(1)
- * Club domestic league appearances and goals as of 13:22, 15 June 2021 (UTC)

Octavian Mihail Ionescu (born March 15, 1990) is a Romanian former professional footballer who played as a center back for teams such as Rapid II București, FC Argeș Pitești or Gloria Bistrița, among others.
