= Ionuț Rada (footballer, born 1990) =

Romanian footballer

Personal information
- Full name: Ionuț Constantin Rada
- Date of birth: 16 March 1990 (age 36)
- Place of birth: Târgu Jiu, Romania
- Height: 1.88 m (6 ft 2 in)
- Position: Centre back

Senior career*
| Years | Team | Apps | (Gls) |
| 2010–2014 | Pandurii Târgu Jiu | 36 | (1) |
| 2014–2015 | Mioveni | 14 | (0) |
| 2016 | Muscelul Câmpulung | | |

International career^{‡}
| 2011–2012 | Romania U-21 | 3 | (0) |
- * Club domestic league appearances and goals as of 29 May 2016 ‡ National team caps and goals as of 2 September 2011

Ionuț Constantin Rada (born 16 March 1990 in Târgu Jiu) is a Romanian footballer who plays as a defender.

== Honours ==
=== Club ===
Pandurii

- Liga I: runner-up 2013
