= Irina Iordachescu =

Romanian soprano opera singer (born 1977)

- Born: 9 March 1977 (age 48); Bucharest, Romania
- Occupation: Opera singer (soprano)
- Years active: 1997 – present
- Website: www.irinaiordachescu.com

Irina Iordachescu is a Romanian soprano opera singer.

== Early life ==
Soprano Irina Iordachescu was born in Bucharest, into a family of musicians. Her father is Dan Iordachescu, a professional singer (baritone). Her sister, Cristina, is a mezzo-soprano.

== Career ==
Her repertoire is in the period extending from baroque to verismo. She has specialized in the works of Mozart and in the Bel Canto manner, particularly in works by Vincenzo Bellini and Giuseppe Verdi.

She has appeared at Milan's Teatro Alla Scala and toured with them in 2001, Las Palmas Teatro, Ravenna's Teatro Dante Alighieri, Piacenzas' Teatro Communale, Dante Alighieri Theatre, Moscow's P.I. Ceaikovski Concert Hall, Great Concert Hall of the Saint Petersburg Philharmonic, Catania, Italy at the Orchestra dell' E.A.R Teatro Massimo, George Enescu Philharmonic Orchestra and Choir, at the Romanian Atheneum, Kefalonia, Greece, Belgium's at Theater Capitole (Ghent), Stradella Opera Teather (Italy), Romanian National Radio Concert Hall, Vaasa (Finland) City Orchestra Concert Hall, Coventry Cathedral in London, Thessaloniki Great Concert Hall – Thessaloniki - Greece, Alicante, Spain, Timișoara,, Romanian National Opera, Bucharest, Municipal Theatre, Piacenza, Concert Hall at the Bucharest University,

Teatro Massimo “ Vicenzo Bellini “ / Catania - Italia Glyndebourne Opera Festival - UK Sankt Margarethen Opernfestspiele - Austria “ Isaac Stern ‘’Carnegie Hall“ Teatro “ Perez Galdos “ / Las Palmas – Spain

Romanian Atheneum “George Enescu” Philharmonic National Operas in Cluj & Constanta - Romania State Operas in Sofia, Russe, Plovdiv & Varna - Bulgaria Bergen Opera – Norway

“ P.I. Ceaikovski “ Concert Hall in Moscow - Russia Philharmonic Great Concert Hall in Sankt Petersburg - Russia Philharmonic Concert Hall in Mulhouse – France Salle Flagey in Bruxelles – Belgium Auditorium Concert Hall in Barcelona – Spain Theater Capitole Gent & SB–Vlaamse Opera Theater Antwerpen – Belgium Vaasa State Concert Hall Abay State Opera House - Almaty ( Kazakhstan)

Her roles have included Zeyno Kari in Teneke, Pamina in The Magic Flute, Giulietta in I Capuleti e I Montecch, Irene from Domenico Cimarosa Il ritorno di Don Calandrino, Lucia in Lucia di Lammermoor, Gilda in Rigoletto, Norina in Don Pasquale, Adina in L'elisir d'amore, Domizia in Decebalo, Fiordiligi in Cosi fan tutte, Pamina in Die Zauberflöte, Susanna in The Marriage of Figaro, Musetta in La Bohème, Valencienne in The Merry Widow, Liu in Turandot, Violetta Valery in La Traviata, Mimi in La Bohème, Micaela in Carmen, and Desdemona in ‘’Otello’’, Mass in B minor, Verdi's Requiem, Great Mass in C minor, K. 427, the voice in Verdi's Te Deum, Mozart's Requiem,, A German Requiem (Brahms),, first soprano part from Beethoven's Choral Fantasy,, Lucia in Lucia di Lammermoor,, Norina in Don Pasquale,

=== In Romania ===
Valencienne from Die lustige Witwe F. Lehar. Lehar,

=== Other ===
- November 2000 - Italy, Milan "TEATRO ALLA SCALA" - Concert commemorating 100 years of G. Verdi with the La Scala Opera Chorus
- 2001-June - Italy, Ravenna "Ravenna Festival" in "Teatro Dante Alighieri - The role of Juliet in "I Capuleti e I Montecito" by V. Bellini, conducted by Maestro Julian Kovatchev
- July 2001 - Italy, Ravenna - Concert with "The Philharmonic Orchestra of the Teatro alla Scala conducted by Maestro Riccardo Muti
- July 2001 - Armenia, Yerevan - Concert with "The Philharmonic Orchestra of the Teatro alla Scala"
- July 2001 - Turkey, Istanbul - Concert with "The Philharmonic Orchestra of the Teatro alla Scala" and "Association Scala Philharmonic Chorus"
- September 2001 - Poland, Poznan - "Teatro alla Scala on tour in Eastern Europe"
- May 2002 - Luxembourg, Eglise Saint Michel - Concert by 'Estro Armonico Orchestra and Chorus, under the baton of Maestro Dafydd Bullock "Exultate, jubilate" by Mozart, Soprano Nelsonmass part of the "Missa in angustiis" by Haydn
- 19 June 2003 and 21 - Luxembourg, Eglise Saint-Michel, Mozart's "Requiem", with "L'Estro Armonico" orchestra and choir, conducted by Dafydd Bullock
- 2003 June 27 and 28 - France, Mulhouse, spinning, Brahms "Ein Deutsches Requiem" with the Orchestre symphonique de Mulhouse conducted by Cyril Diederich
- October–November 2003 - United States of America, concerts in New York (Carnegie Hall, Isaac Stern Auditorium), Detroit and Chicago
- November 2003 - Israel, Concert Opera of Tel Aviv and Haifa
- April–May 2004 - Brussels, the International Competition "Queen Elizabeth"
- September 2007 - Teatro alla Scala in Milan, in one of the leading roles, that of Kari's Zeyno from "Teneke" by Fabio Vacchi
- November 2007 - Las Palmas and Ravenna, in the role of Irene from 'The Return of Don Calandrino' of Domenico Cimarosa, work recently discovered by Maestro Riccardo Muti.
- December 27, 2008, was invited to sing at the Christmas concert with the Italian tenor Marcello Giordani.
- July 10, 2009 in the role of 'Gilda' on the stage of "Sankt Margarethen Festival 2009" - Austria, in 10 of the benefits of the new "Rigoletto" production of Italian director Renzo Giacchieri.

== Prizes ==
In November 1997, she won the seventh annual National Competition Interpretation "Mihail Jora" Prize winner "Mihail Jora".

In 1997 she became a laureate of national singing competitions, such as "Mihail Jora" - Second Prize and "Ionel Perlea" - Grand Prize.

In May 1999, she wond the VIII Concorso d'interpretation Lied "Ionel Perlei", winner of the Grand Prix and the medal "Ionel Perlei"

In November 2001, she won the Italy, Vercelli - Competition Viotti: International Singing Competition "Giuseppe Verdi", finalist and winner of the Jury Special Prize "Cesare Bardelli"

In May 2002, she won the Spain, Murcia - International Singing Coloratura "Sylvia Geszty", winner of the 3rd Prize.

She is a laureate of international singing competitions such as "G.B. Viotti" - Italia - Prize "Cesare Bardelli "; "Silvia Geszty" - Spain - Third Prize; "Maria Callas" - Greece - Third Prize; "Vincenzo Bellini" - Italy - Second Prize; "IVC s’Hertogenbosch" - the Netherlands -Third Prize & Prize of the Public, Second Prize at the ‘’Alfredo Giacomotti ‘’ Competition in Italy, 2013.

In September 2002, she won the Italy, Caltanissetta - Competition V. Bellini: Concorso Internazionale di Canto, vincitrice del concorso. Bellini: International Singing Competition, winner of the contest.

In September 2002, she wond the Italy, Catania - Teatro Massimo Bellini: Concerto Winners.

In March 2003, she won the Greece, Athens - Grand Prix Maria Callas International Singing Competition, 3rd Prize Winner.

In 2009 she received the VIP Award for "The Best Opera Singer of the Year in Romania".
