= Cristina Iordachescu =

Romanian singer and pianist (born 1966)

Cristina Iordachescu is a Romanian mezzo-soprano and pianist. She was born October 8, 1966, in Bucharest.

== Biography ==
Cristina Iordachescu was born into a family of artists. Her father, Dan Iordachescu, was a baritone who sang professionally in opera houses throughout Europe. Her mother, Irina Bora Iordachescu, was a television actress. Her sister, Irina, is an opera singer.

She graduated from the Academy of Music Bucharest in 1990.

== Performances ==
She was a laureate in the International Singing Competition ‘Madame Butterfly’ in Miami, 1990. She was a guest singer in the Puccini Festival of Torre del Lago, Viareggio, Italy, 1990. She has taken concert tours in Manila, Salerno, Italy, and the German cities of Bonn, Bremen, Mülheim, Siegburg, Neuwied, Bad Pyrmont, Brilon, and in Luxembourg. She performed the Mozart Requiem with the Orchestra L'estro Armonico and the "Vox" Choir.

She was a soloist for the Romanian National Opera, Bucharest, in 1993 and 1994.

=== Pianist ===
She has given concert tours as a pianist, accompanying her father, baritone Dan Iordachescu, in the United States, Canada and Italy, and on stage of the Romanian Athenaeum in Bucharest and the Opera in Iaşi.

She has performed in concerts on the stage of the Romanian Athenaeum (together with The George Enescu National Orchestra and Choir), The Radio Hall (together with The National Radio Orchestra and Choir), The Romanian Opera, The George Enescu National Museum, The French Institute of Culture, The Cotroceni Museum, The Auditorium Hall, The Academy of Music, The Dalles Hall, The Festival of Chamber Music in Brasov, The Opera of Timișoara, The Philharmonic Hall in Craiova (together with the Craiova Philharmonic Orchestra and Choir), Satu Mare, Constanta. Has performed under the musical direction of conductors Cyril Diederich, Dafydd Bullock, Milen Nachev, Nicolas Astrinidis, Iosif Conta, Gheorghe Costin, Tiberiu Soare, and Iosif Prunner.

== Repertoire ==
Her repertoire includes Mozart's Requiem, Mass in C and Kronungsmesse; Beethoven: The 9th Symphony; Berlioz: Romeo and Juliet; Dafydd Bullock – Mass in D; Nicolas Astrinidis – Alexandros Megalos Oratorio; Giuseppe Verdi's Rigoletto; Richard Strauss – Ariadne auf Naxos; cameral and symphonic works by A. Caldara, F. Durante, C. Monteverdi, G. Giordani, A. Stradella, A. Scarlatti, B. Marcello, G.B. Pergolesi, G. Caccini, C.W. Gluck, Haendel, Bach, Haydn, Mozart, Schubert, Schumann, Mendelssohn, R. Hahn, Debussy, Franck, Faure, Duparc, G. Enescu, Poulenc, Respighi, Obradors, Strauss, Dvořák, Menotti, Tosti, Pennino, Di Capua, Denza, Volpe; opera arias by Haendel, Gluck, Mozart, Rossini, Donizetti, Verdi, Bellini, Ponchielli, Cilea, Puccini, A. Thomas, Bizet, Massenet, Saint-Saëns, Offenbach, Ceaikovski.

She has produced the following recordings: The Iordachescu Musical Dynasty edited by "Music 2001", together with her father and her sister; Mozart Requiem – Bullock Mass in D, together with Irina Iordachescu, Christian Chenille, Arthur Stammet, with the Orchestra 'L’Estro Armonico' and the 'Vox' Choir of Luxembourg, conducted by Dafydd Bullock, edited by 2003; Emotions – with her sister, edited by 'Irini', 2005.

== Personal life ==
She is married to Claudiu Iordache, a Romanian legislator and author. They have two sons.
