= Sioux City Municipal Auditorium =

Historic auditorium in Iowa, United States

- Municipal Auditorium
- U.S. National Register of Historic Places
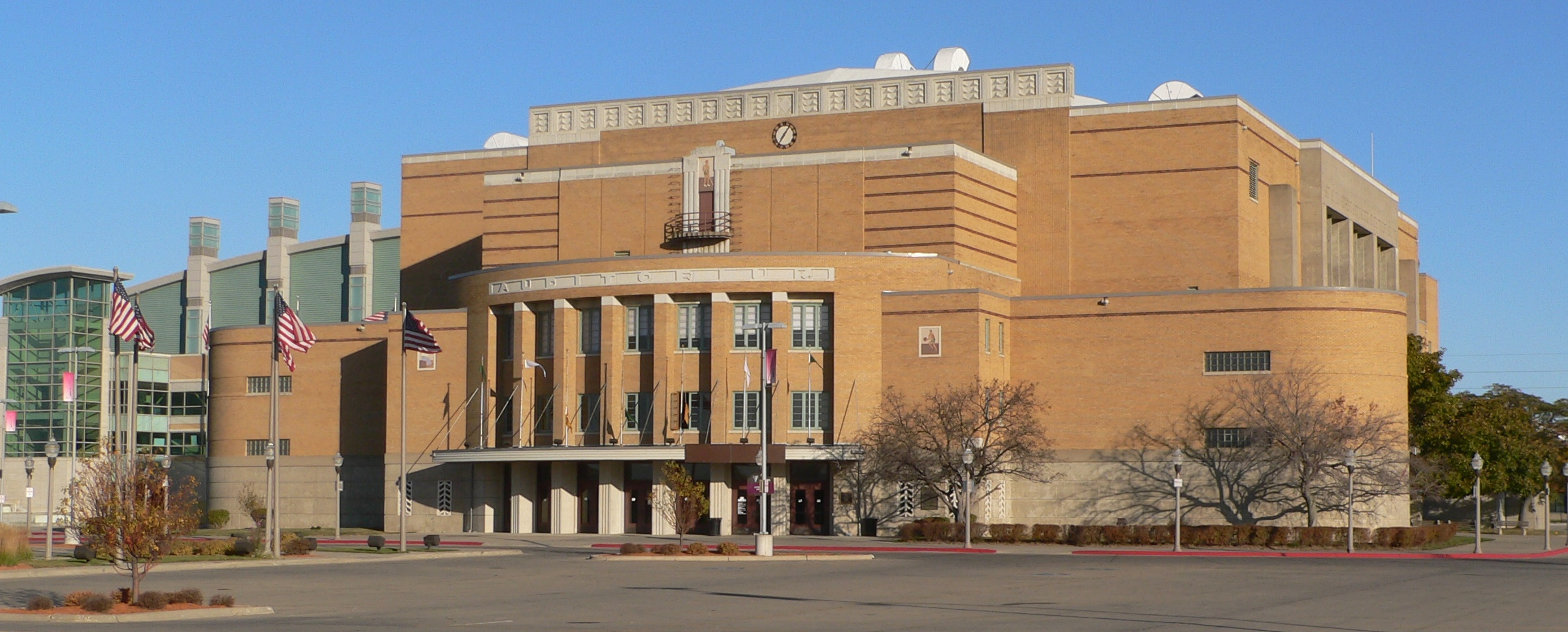
- Auditorium, seen from the southeast; the 2003 arena is in the left background

- Location within Iowa Location within the United States
- Location: 401 Gordon Drive; Sioux City, Iowa; United States
- Coordinates: 42°29′34″N 96°24′24″W
- Architect: Knute E. Westerlind
- Architectural style: Moderne
- NRHP reference No.: 06000316
- Added to NRHP: July 27, 2006

The Sioux City Municipal Auditorium, known as the Long Lines Family Recreation Center or Long Lines Auditorium for sponsorship reasons, is a multi-purpose facility in Sioux City, Iowa. The fifth in a line of major indoor venues built in Sioux City, it was designed by Knute E. Westerlind in 1938 and finally completed after many delays in 1950. In the building's original form, it was an arena that seated up to 3,500 people. In 2003, the building was replaced by the Tyson Events Center, built around the northeast corner of the Municipal Auditorium. The building was then converted to its current use as a recreation center while preserving the exterior building. The converted arena was originally named Long Lines Family Recreation Center, though in 2023 the building added the Long Lines Auditorium signing to the southeast entrance and inside the auditorium. The auditorium is referred to as either name.

== History ==
For countless generations, the Native American residents at the confluence of the Big Sioux River with the Missouri River held their ceremonies, performances, and sporting events primarily outdoors, without need of specialized structures. The fourth Treaty of Prairie du Chien in 1830 forced them to leave Iowa, and forty years later the new White residents built the first in a series of five major indoor venues for Sioux City: the Academy of Music of 1870, the Peavey Grand Opera House of 1888, the Old Municipal Auditorium of 1909, this one completed in 1950, and Gateway Arena of 2003.

The Academy of Music was located between Pierce and Douglas Streets on the southern side of Fourth Street. Designed by local architect H.O. Ball and erected by the firm of Sharp and Beck, it employed cast iron columns, a brick exterior, and terra cotta. The first floor included the city post office and commercial space, with an 800-seat performance space on the second floor. As the city's only large hall, it held high school graduations, theatrical performances, concerts, and speeches, including at least two by Susan B. Anthony speaking on behalf of women's suffrage. The building ended its life as part of the growing Davidson Brothers Department Store, and was demolished in 1910 to make way for a better structure for the store.

The Peavey Grand Opera House was built in 1888, and "this elegant facility replaced the Academy of Music as the city's cultural center". The limitations of the Academy of Music were clear by 1881, but it wasn't until it was combined with the desire for a new chamber of commerce building that it became a viable project. Architects James W. Martin and Oscar Cobb joined forces to design the resulting Romanesque revival building with a mansard roof, located on the northwest corner of Fourth and Jones Streets. A bank and a drug store occupied either side of the theater lobby on the first floor, while the chamber of commerce, local weather bureau, real estate and other offices filled the upper floors. The opera hall itself was in back, and seated over 1300 in lavish style. During its heyday, Sarah Bernhardt, "the most famous actress the world has ever known", and Edwin Booth, the greatest Hamlet of the 19th Century, each played the Peavey. After 1909 the hall was no longer in demand, and the deteriorating hall was eventually relegated to Hans Esperson's auto repair garage, while the elegant front offices housed the seedy Grand Hotel and Harry Zanfes' Cafe. The whole thing went up in flames on November 3, 1931.

The Old Municipal Auditorium of 1909 was built on the southwest corner of Seventh and Douglas Streets, directly across Douglas from the site where construction would begin seven years later on the outstanding Woodbury County Courthouse. Designed by architect George W. Burkhead, this was the first of the buildings dedicated exclusively to the performance hall. Its most distinctive features are the pediment high over the main entrance, above the brick cornice, and prominent keystones over the entrances. It was undistinguished architecturally; soon after its construction, The Western Architect characterized it as "an ugly, barn-like structure dignified by the name of 'Auditorium'." It was the home of television station KCAU-TV (original call letters KVTV) from 1955 until early 2017. On January 28, 2025, it was announced by the City of Sioux City that the building posed a safety threat and would begin the demolition process as soon as possible.

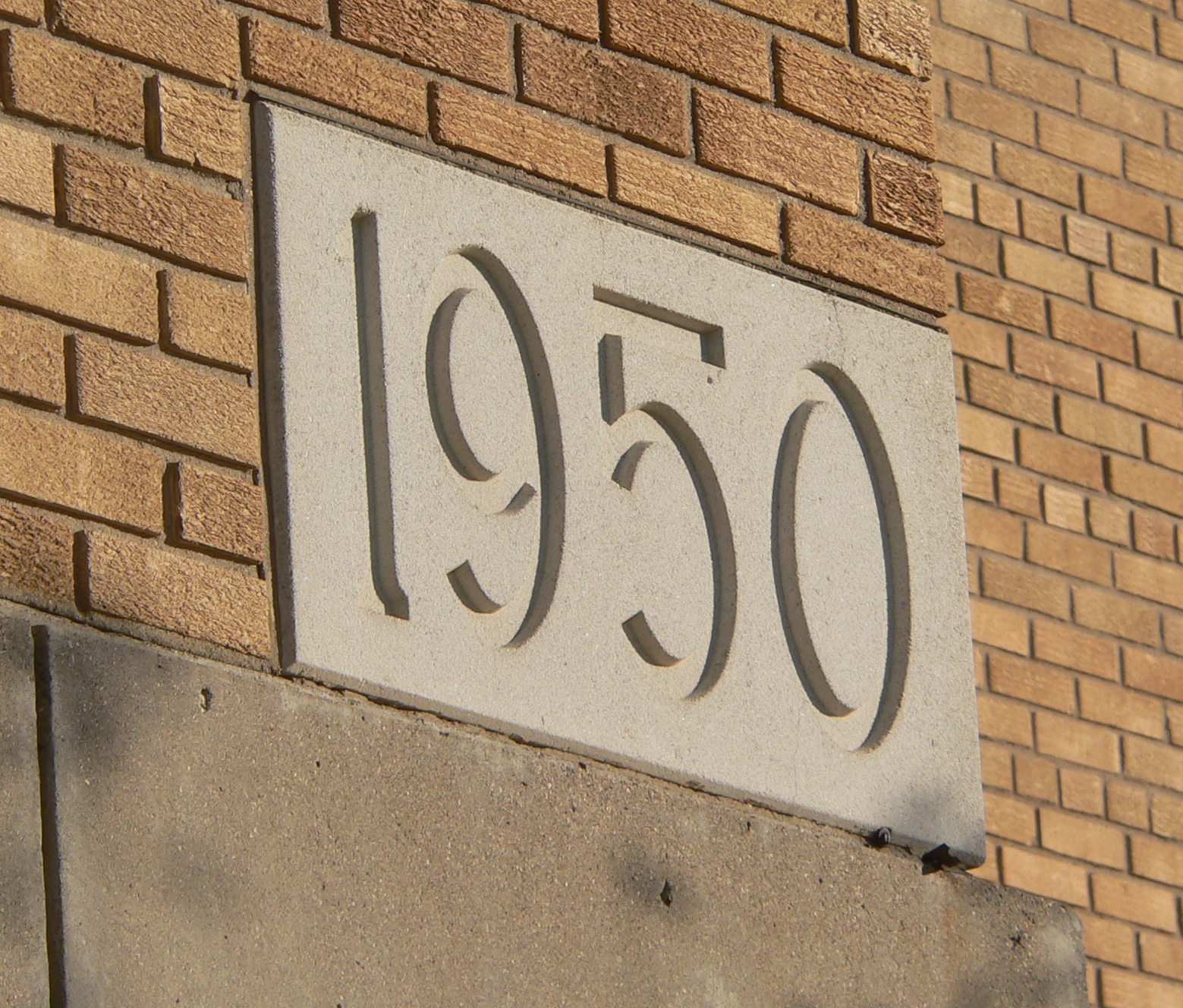
The cornerstone at the southeast shows the year completed rather than begun.

The Old Municipal Auditorium of 1909 was no longer meeting the needs of Sioux City by the 1930s, but the Sioux City Auditorium was a long time in coming. Originally designed by architect Knute E. Westerlind in 1938, it took nearly 12 years to complete. In the election of 1938, city voters approved a $590,000 bond referendum, but the city postponed action in an ultimately fruitless bid to secure federal assistance. Finally issuing the bonds in April 1941, the basement was dug and pilings driven before World War II shortages caused the project to grind to a halt in 1943. Work resumed in 1947, but only after the electorate approved an additional $975,000 bond referendum. Post-war inflation, cost over-runs, poor planning, and other problems resulted in the need for a third bond referendum, this time for over $1.4 million on April 26, 1949. Ultimately costing more than $2.7 million, the new facility was dedicated on September 9, 1950.

For over 50 years, the auditorium routinely hosted graduations, concerts, and sporting events, including the Sioux City Symphony Orchestra and (since 1972) the Sioux City Musketeers ice hockey team. Until 1982 it served as the home arena for the Briar Cliff College Chargers. Among those appearing on its stage were Elvis Presley, Robert Plant, Richard M. Nixon, John F. Kennedy and Van Cliburn.

In 2001, the Sioux City Symphony moved to the newly restored Orpheum Theater, and in 2003 the venue was replaced for large concerts and sporting events by Gateway Arena. The new Events Center was built around to the northwest corner of the Municipal Auditorium, with doors added to connect the buildings. Part of the former Municipal Auditorium is used by the Events Center for storage, and the dressing rooms are still being used for Events Center acts. A historical preservation group wanted to maintain the history of the arena and decided to use it for recreation, naming it the Long Lines Family Recreation Center, being sponsored by Long Lines. Among other attractions, the center offers volleyball and basketball courts, a batting cage, and a climbing wall; and hosts weddings, receptions, and other events.

== Architecture ==
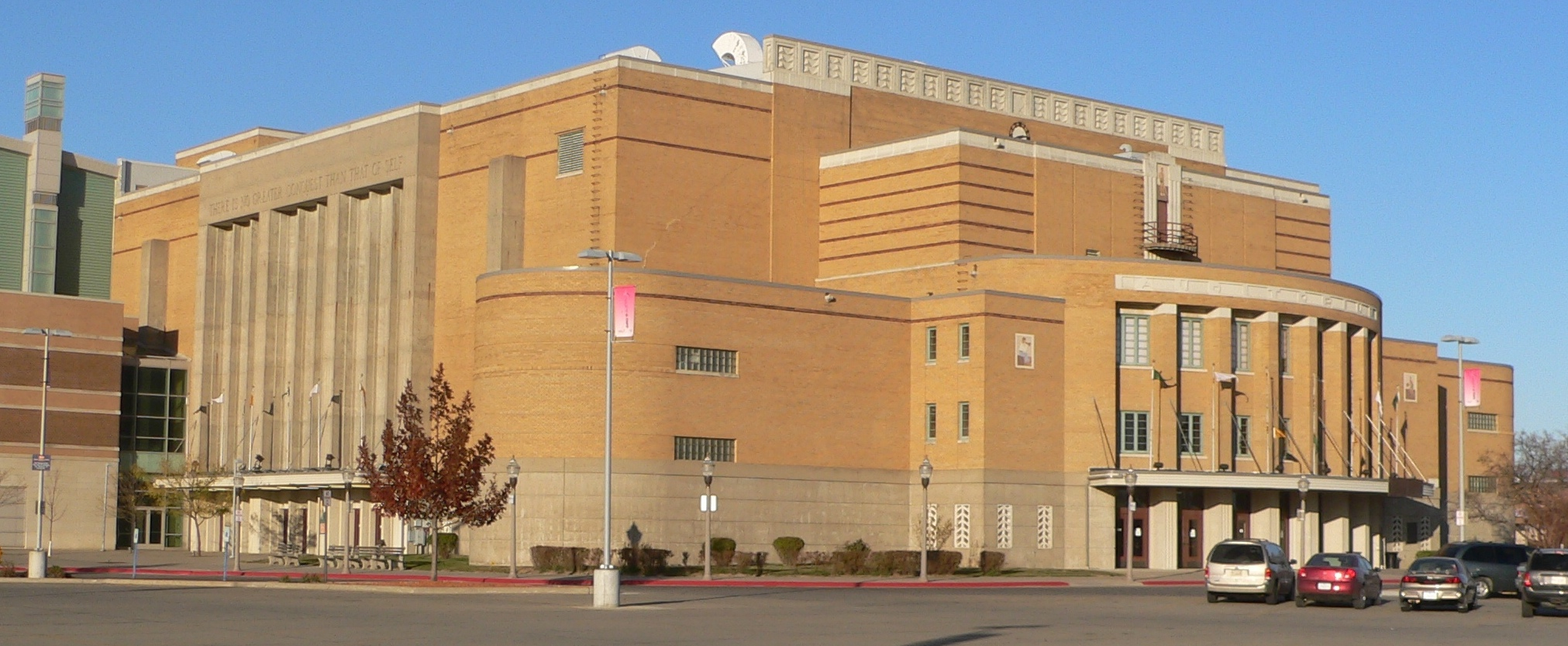
The Auditorium's smooth brick walls, rounded corners, and deeply incised openings typify the Moderne style.

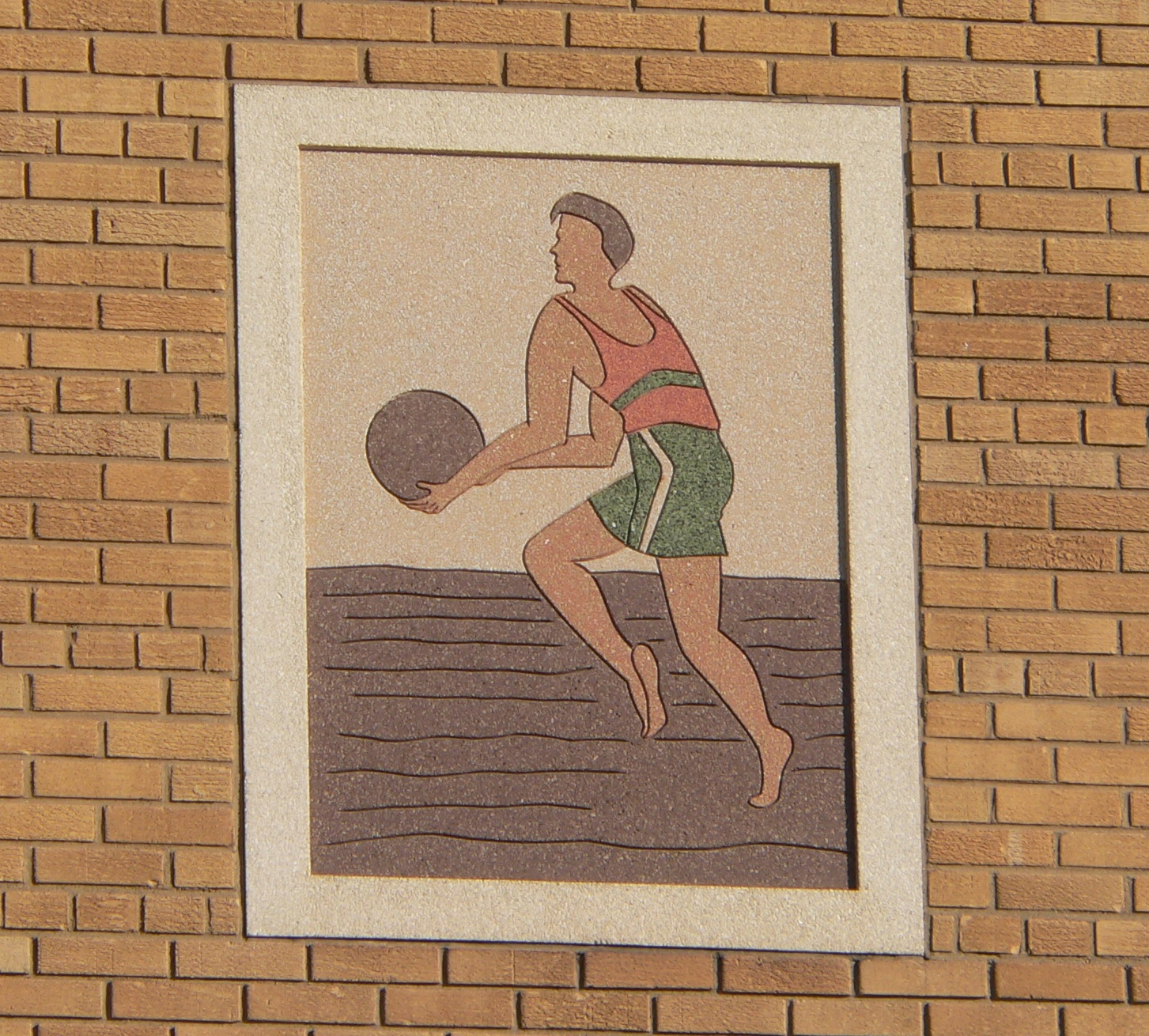
Terra cotta panel on the Auditorium's south exterior, east of the main entrance

Knute E. Westerlind's design is fundamentally PWA Moderne, a style in vogue in the 1930s when it was originally designed. In keeping with Moderne style, Westerlind employed smooth brick walls, rounded corners, glass block windows, patterns of horizontal lines, and openings that appear "cut into the building". However, Westerlind, a protege of prominent Prairie School architect William L. Steele, brought a Beaux-Arts approach to determining its massing, symmetry, proportions, and details. In this divergence of style with approach, he was in keeping with his mentor, since Steele often brought a Beaux-Arts sensibility to his fundamentally Prairie School compositions.

The building is rich in details, including relief sculptures of stylized Native Americans on the northern exterior, and a number of terra cotta panels on the southern exterior, each depicting a person involved in a sporting or musical activity. There are inscriptions above the entrances: the one on the west reads "There is No Greater Conquest Than That of Self", while the one on the east reads "Art at Its Highest and Nature at Its Truest are One".

== See also ==
- Tyson Events Center
- Sioux City Musketeers
- Sioux City Symphony Orchestra
- Orpheum Theatre (Sioux City, Iowa)
