= Darryl Kubian =

- Born: February 19, 1966 (age 60)
- Origin: Denver, Colorado, U.S.
- Genres: Film score, contemporary classical music, post-romanticism
- Occupations: Composer, thereminist, violinist, audio engineer, video engineer
- Years active: 1986–present
- Website: DarrylKubian.com, Indigo Fox Media

Darryl Kubian (born February 19, 1966) is an American composer, thereminist, violinist, and audio/video engineer. His compositions have been commissioned and performed by North American orchestras, such as the New Jersey Symphony Orchestra and Omaha Symphony, and he has written soundtrack scores for the Wildlife Conservation Society, National Geographic, Discovery Channel, Pangolin Pictures, NHK, CBS, The Learning Channel, and others. Darryl performs and records as a thereminist, including chamber and solo works by Herb Deutsch, Martinu, and others, and has also been a featured soloist with the Chicago Symphony Orchestra, the Philharmonia of New York, and the NJ Symphony on theremin. He was the featured theremin soloist for the Lincoln Center Festival production of Danny Elfman's Music from the Films of Tim Burton. Darryl Kubian is a member of the first violin section of the NJ Symphony, and was the principal second violinist of the Brooklyn Philharmonic. Indigo Fox Media, Kubian's New Jersey–based audio/video production company, has recorded artists such as the Emerson String Quartet, the Orpheus Chamber Orchestra, members of the NY Philharmonic, New Jersey Symphony, and the Metropolitan Opera, among many others. He is married to violinist JoAnna Farrer.

== Compositions ==
=== Symphonic ===
==== The Well of Urd ====
In March 2023, the New Jersey Symphony premiered The Well of Urd, a tone poem and concerto for full orchestra and three soloists. (The three solo instruments are the French horn, trumpet, and cello.) The work is inspired by Norse mythology, with each soloist representing one of the three Norns, the weavers of the Fate. The soloists for its premiere performances were Chris Komer, principal horn of the NJ Symphony; Garth Greenup, principal trumpet of the Symphony; and Nayoung Baek, assistant principal cello of the New Jersey Symphony.

Reception

"The Well of Urd" received positive reviews in its premiere. From NJ.com: "The 23-minute piece, commissioned by the New Jersey Symphony, began with an extended low tone (reminiscent of then opening Wagner’s “Das Rheingold”) soon joined by a few harp plucks and then a woodwind melody. A dissonant, Ives-like trumpet sound from off-stage (played by Garth Greenup) then sets up a haunting cello solo by Nayoung Baek, that starts with a twisting, leaping line and ends with severe pizzicato pulls. Chris Komer's horn playing meshed well with the other two soloists and Zhang sculpted some elegant musical phrases with the orchestra. [...] 'The Well of Urðr' recalled early 20th-century symphonic poems of Arnold Bax and Ottorino Respighi—elegant, reflective pieces that showcase orchestral color."

==== O for a Muse of Fire ====
In March 2015, the New Jersey Symphony Orchestra premiered Darryl's work, O for a Muse of Fire, a concert overture for full orchestra and vocal soloist, based on Shakespeare's Henry V. The work is dedicated to the New Jersey Symphony Orchestra and its music director, Jacques Lacombe. The soloist for the premiere performances with the New Jersey Symphony Orchestra was former October Project lead singer (and former Sony Classical artist) Mary Fahl. The vocal part is adaptable to different vocal ranges.

Reception

"O For a Muse of Fire" received positive reviews in its premiere performances. From Broadway World publication: "The overall composition is dramatic with flurries of vibrant musicality especially among the violins and brass. ... Mary Fahl has a dramatic, beautiful voice. This is a cinematic composition that builds steadily and majestically. One wishes Kubian had fleshed it out more. He will be a composer to keep one's eye on whether he pursues dramatic or cinema scores or continues in a classical venue." From The Star Ledger: "As the composer noted in an articulate pre-performance introduction, the music dealt with the conscience of the king, exploring matters earthly and spiritual and taking on sounds of both warfare and contemplation. ... a cinematic fabric with deep lower strings and soaring brass. Dissonant threads in sustained chords and warlike percussion contrasted warm, meditative passages. In an earthy alto, vocalist Mary Fahl sang passages of Shakespeare text and keened wordlessly in the work's more impassioned moments. A waterphone added an otherworldly tinge before a frenetic rise and the pound of battle drums led to a fittingly heroic conclusion."

==== 3-2-1 Concerto for Electric and Acoustic Violin and Orchestra ====
During the 2007–08 season, the NJSO gave the premiere of Kubian's 3-2-1 Concerto for Electric and Acoustic Violin and Orchestra — an NJSO commission dedicated to then-Music Director Neeme Järvi and NJSO Concertmaster (and soloist) Eric Wyrick. A preview about the Kubian and the new work was featured on NJN's State of the Arts. This NJN segment can be found online here: 3-2-1 on NJN's State of the Arts

Reception

The work was very well received in its premiere, and was subsequently broadcast on WQXR radio. From The Star Ledger review: "The piece balances the sort of electronic effects taken for granted in pop music with an open-hearted lyricism redolent of mainstream film scores, as it moves from an evocation of the Big Bang to a pool of idyllic repose to a cyclic, out-the-door rush. ... He [Eric Wyrick] triggered new colors with a pedal board at his feet, shifting from that initial serrated timbre to a sound like a celestial lyre; the violinist also set echoing loops into motion so that he accompanied himself along with the orchestra. The effect was so texturally engaging that one almost wished that Kubian had written a concerto entirely for electric violin (as John Adams did so well recently with "The Dharma at Big Sur") ... When Wyrick's electric violin soared above the orchestra again in full cry, the sheer lyricism was stirring, the instrument's hot edge searing away any sentimentality into something pure and affecting. ... Listeners seemed to enjoy the experience from the first note, with an attentive excitement in the air that isn't always there."

Eric Wyrick performed the work with the Orquesta Sinfónica de Michoacán in Mexico, in October 2009. A CD of this collaboration was recorded and released.

==== Other works ====
Kubian’s The Maestro Waltz, a special 70th-birthday piece for Neeme Järvi, was the featured encore during a number of NJSO concerts; it is also mentioned in Järvi’s biography, The Maestro’s Touch. Other recent works include the symphonic overture Occam’s Razor, premiered in May 2009 and performed by the Omaha Symphony in March 2012.

=== TV/film ===
Darryl Kubian has composed scores for the Wildlife Conservation Society, National Geographic, Discovery Channel, Pangolin Pictures, NHK, CBS, and The Learning Channel. Highlights of his work with National Geographic include being the composer for the children's show "Really Wild Animals" show, and "Jaws and Claws." For the Wildlife Conservation Society, Darryl has composed soundtracks for USAid, and the US Department of Defense.

== Thereminist ==
Darryl has performed as theremin soloist with the Chicago Symphony Orchestra, the Oregon Symphony, the Philharmonia Orchestra of New York, and the New Jersey Symphony Orchestra. In January 2026, Darryl performed as thereminist with the Nashville Symphony and Maestro Leonard Slatkin, in a performance of Miklós Rózsa’s Spellbound Concerto for Piano and Orchestra. (He performed the same work in October 2019, with the Indianapolis Chamber Orchestra.) In September 2024, Darryl was the featured thereminist with the Houston Ballet in a production of the Lera Auerbach's The Little Mermaid. In 2017, he performed as thereminist for the work in performances with the Kennedy Center Opera Orchestra and the Hamburg Ballet, and in 2023, with the Lyric Opera of Chicago and the Joffrey Ballet. In 2024, he performed the Martinu Fantasia for Theremin, Oboe, Piano and String Quartet at Carnegie Hall with the Met Orchestra Chamber Players of the Metropolitan Opera and as a guest artist with the Craftsbury Chamber Players and at the Aspen Music Festival and School. In previous years, he has also performed the work with the Concordia Chamber Players, and the Bronx Arts Ensemble. In November 2022, Darryl performed as thereminist in Lera Auerbach's orchestral work, Icarus, with the Oregon Symphony. In January 2019, Darryl performed with the Cincinnati Pops Orchestra in a program titled "Pops in Space". He is featured as theremin soloist on the 2019 Cincinnati Pops Orchestra album, VOYAGE. In July 2015, Darryl was the featured theremin soloist for the Lincoln Center Festival's production of Danny Elfman's Music from the Films of Tim Burton. In the same month, Darryl performed as theremin soloist with the Chicago Symphony Orchestra at the Ravinia festival, again performing works by Danny Elfman. The Lincoln Center performances were filmed by Live from Lincoln Center and later broadcast on PBS stations beginning October 30, 2015. As theremin soloist with the NJ Symphony, Kubian has performed Bachianis Brasileires No. 5 by Villa-Lobos, the theme from Star Trek, and the Spellbound Suite by Miklos Rozsa. He has performed both solo and chamber works as part of the Parlance Chamber Concert Series, the Ridgewood Concert Band, and Manchester Music Festival. Darryl's performance of Two Songs Without Words for Theremin and Piano by Herbert Deutsch, is featured on Deutsch's CD release of his works, “From Moog to Mac.”

== Violinist ==
Darryl is a member of the New Jersey Symphony Orchestra's first violin section, and former principal second violinist of the Brooklyn Philharmonic Orchestra. A jazz musician and improvisor, he has performed with trumpeter Randy Brecker in a Charlie Parker program entitled “Bird Lives!” and has arranged and performed Ellington's “Sacred Songs” in collaboration with the Jazz Studies Program at Rutgers University. Kubian has performed and improvised with Nigel Kennedy, Al Jarreau, Rufus Reid, Bobby Short and Renée Fleming. He has recorded with Trevor Pinnock, Malcolm Bilson, Meredith Monk, Bruno Weil, Zdenek Macal and Philip Glass.

== Audio/video engineer ==
Darryl Kubian is the audio/video engineer of his production company, Indigo Fox Media. Kubian has recorded the Orpheus Chamber Orchestra, Ridgewood Concert Band, NY Flute Club and the Chesapeake Chamber Music Festival. Indigo Fox Media records and produces both audio and video for the Parlance Chamber Concert series in Ridgewood, NJ., which frequently features members of the Metropolitan Opera and NY Philharmonic, and other ensembles. Darryl has recorded and produced CD's and audio work for The Elements Quartet, the Halcyon Trio, and Mixed Flock Ensemble, as well as members of the NJ Symphony Orchestra, Metropolitan Opera and NY Philharmonic. In 2020, Darryl Kubian was the audio and video engineer for the New Jersey Symphony's online release of "Beethoven 5 at Home," featuring over 60 members of the Symphony.
