= Jacques Lacombe =

Canadian conductor

Jacques Lacombe, CM CQ (born July 14, 1963 in Cap-de-la-Madeleine, Quebec) is a Canadian conductor.

== Biography ==
Lacombe began his musical learning with choral singing. He later trained as an organist, and continued his studies at the Conservatoire de musique du Québec à Montréal and at the Hochschule für Musik in Vienna. He was assistant conductor of the Montreal Symphony Orchestra from 1994 to 1998, and later its principal guest conductor from 2002 to 2006. He was chief conductor and music director of Les Grands Ballets Canadiens from 1990 to 2003. He became music director of the Orchestre symphonique de Trois-Rivières (Trois-Rivières Symphony Orchestra) in 2006, and held the post through the close of the 2017-2018 season. In Europe, Lacombe was music director of the Philharmonie de Lorraine in Metz, France from 1998 to 2001.

In November 2008, Lacombe guest-conducted the New Jersey Symphony Orchestra (NJSO) for the first time. This appearance led to his appointment in October 2009 as the NJSO's 13th music director, effective with the 2010-2011 season. Lacombe held the title of music director designate for the 2009-2010 season. His initial contract as music director was for 3 years. In July 2012, the NJSO announced the extension of Lacombe's contract as music director through the 2015-2016 season. He ended his tenure with the NJSO at the conclusion of the 2015-2016 season. Composer Darryl Kubian dedicated his new composition O For a Muse of Fire to Lacombe and the New Jersey Symphony Orchestra, who premiered the work in March 2015.

In August 2015, the Theater Bonn announced the appointment of Lacombe as the new chief conductor of Bonn Opera, effective with the 2016-2017 season, with an initial contract of 2 years. Lacombe stood down from the Theater Bonn post in 2018. In June 2017, the Orchestre symphonique de Mulhouse announced the appointment of Lacombe as its next music director and artistic director, effective September 1, 2018. He held the Mulhouse post until 2021. He conducted the French stage premiere of Herrmann's Wuthering Heights in Nancy in May 2019.

In February 2023, the Orchestre classique de Montréal announced the appointment of Lacombe as its next artistic director, effective 1 July 2023, with an initial contract of 5 years. In October 2023, Vancouver Opera announced the appointment of Lacombe as its music director, with immediate effect. In July 2024, the Orchestre classique de Montréal announced the conclusion of Lacombe's tenure as its next artistic director, with immediate effect.

Lacombe and his wife Janet, who first met in 2003, married in 2004. Lacombe was made a Knight of the National Order of Quebec in 2012, and a Member of the Order of Canada the following year.

Cultural offices
| Preceded by Gilles Bellemare | Artistic Director, Orchestre symphonique de Trois-Rivières; 2006–2018 | Succeeded by Alain Trudel |
| Preceded by Neeme Järvi | Music Director, New Jersey Symphony Orchestra; 2010–2016 | Succeeded by Xian Zhang |
| Preceded by Hendrik Vestmann | Chief Conductor, Theater Bonn; 2016–2018 | Succeeded by (successor unknown) |
| Preceded by Patrick Davin | Music Director, Orchestre symphonique de Mulhouse; 2018–2021 | Succeeded by Christoph Koncz |
| Preceded by Boris Brott | Music Director, Orchestre classique de Montréal; 2023–2024 | Succeeded by (post vacant) |
| Preceded by Jonathan Darlington | Music Director, Vancouver Opera; 2023–present | Succeeded by incumbent |
