= William I. Buchanan =

American diplomat

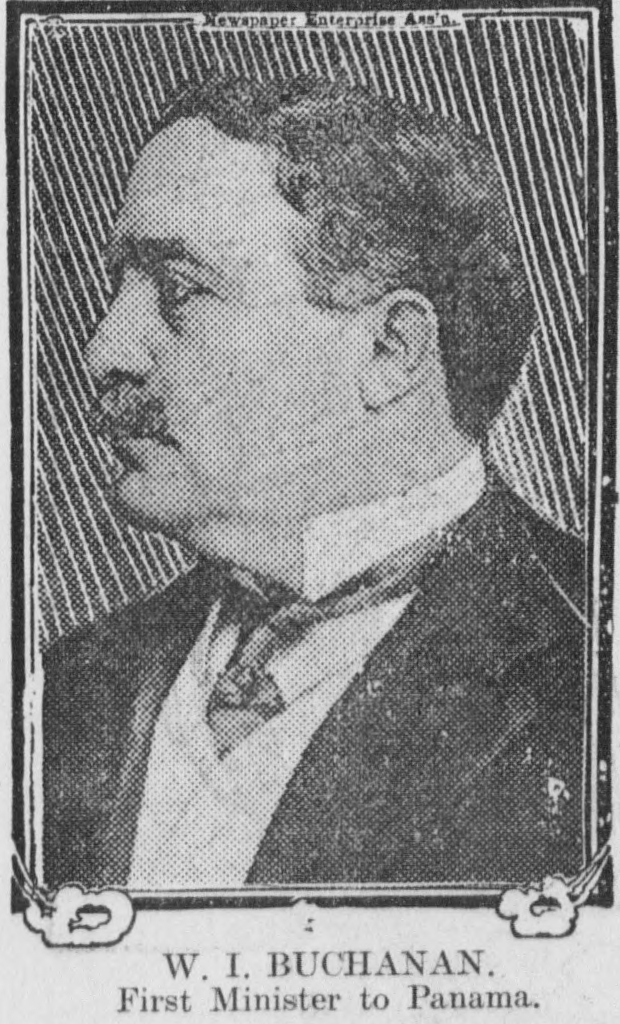

United States Minister to Panama
- In office December 17, 1903 – February 2, 1904
- President: Theodore Roosevelt
- Preceded by: Inaugural holder
- Succeeded by: John Barrett

14th United States Minister to Argentina
- In office May 19, 1894 – July 11, 1899
- President: Grover Cleveland; William McKinley
- Preceded by: John R. G. Pitkin
- Succeeded by: William Paine Lord

Personal details
- Born: William Insco Buchanan; September 10, 1853 Covington, Ohio
- Died: October 17, 1909 (aged 56) London, England
- Party: Democrat
- Spouse: Laura ("Lulu") Williams
- Relations: Charles Insco Williams (brother-in-law); Eva Williams Best (sister-in-law)

William Insco Buchanan (September 10, 1853 – October 17, 1909) was an American diplomat who spent much of his career in Latin America.

== Early life ==
Buchanan was born in Covington, Ohio, on September 10, 1853. He was a son of George Preston Buchanan and Mary Eliza (née Gibson) Buchanan.

== Career ==
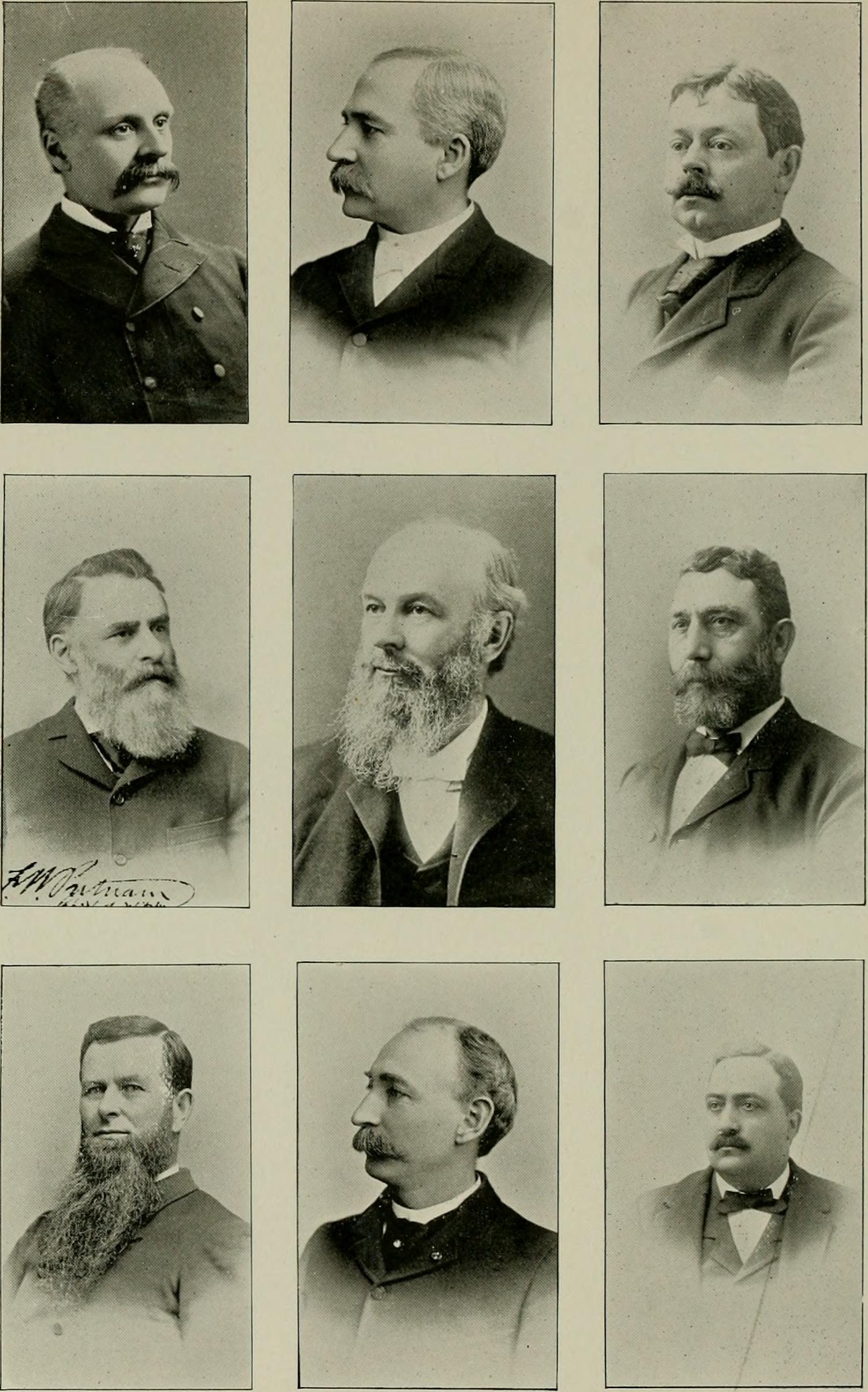
Department chiefs, including Buchanan, of the World's Columbian Exposition, 1893.

After receiving an education at the common schools in Ohio, he served as engrossing clerk of the Indiana House of Representatives from 1874 to 1875. Buchanan moved to Sioux City, Iowa, in 1882 and was an organizer of the Corn Palace Exposition there. He also organized the Academy of Music and an opera house. His work with the Sioux City Corn Palace Exposition led to his appointment as overseer of the World's Columbian Exposition of 1893, held in Chicago.

On January 26, 1894, President Grover Cleveland (the former mayor of Buffalo and governor of New York) appointed Buchanan United States Minister to Argentina. He presented his credentials on May 19, 1894, and served until he left his post on July 11, 1899. He also served as arbitrator on the special commission to fix the boundary between the Chilean and Argentine governments. After William McKinley became president, he kept Buchanan on, even though he was a Democrat and the new president was a Republican. Once Panama separated from Colombia in 1903, he was appointed by President Theodore Roosevelt on December 17, 1903, to serve as United States Minister to Panama. Buchanan presented his credentials as Envoy Extraordinary and Minister Plenipotentiary on special mission in December 1903, however, "he received new credentials as Envoy Extraordinary and Minister Plenipotentiary only a few days before he was to leave Panama and apparently did not present them. He ceased to act "on special mission," however, and conducted business in the capacity of Envoy Extraordinary and Minister Plenipotentiary until his departure."

=== Later career ===
Buchanan was Director General of the Pan-American Exposition, held in Buffalo, New York, from May 1 through November 2, 1901, and is credited with the construction, operation, and dismantling of the exposition. He was chosen by John G. Milburn, president of the exposition, as the exposition was planned with a Latin American theme and they wanted someone who knew the South American countries well. President McKinley was assassinated at the exposition by anarchist Leon Czolgosz on September 6, 1901, and Roosevelt traveled to Buffalo where he was inaugurated shortly thereafter.

In December 1908, Buchanan was appointed special commissioner to Venezuela. In February 1909, he negotiated agreements addressing outstanding American claims against Venezuela, paving the way for the restoration of diplomatic relations between the two countries. By his forbearance, tact, an understanding of the people with whom he was to negotiate and a masterly knowledge of the clames themselves, he succeeded in settling two of the cases, namely, the New York & Bermudez Company affair and recovered all indemnity for the expulsion of A.F. Jaurett. At the time of his death, he was connected with the Westinghouse Company in London.

== Personal life ==
Buchanan was married to Laura "Lulu" Williams (1855–1928), a daughter of John Insco Williams and Mary (née Forman) Williams. Together, they were the parents of:

- Florence Buchanan (1879–1941), who married Charles Hoyt Williams.
- Donald Insco Buchanan (1887–1928), a graduate of the Sheffield Scientific School at Yale University.

He died suddenly on October 17, 1909, while in London on business. An autopsy revealed the cause of death was heart failure. His embalmed body was returned to the United States and he was buried at Forest Lawn Cemetery in Buffalo, New York. His papers are in the collection of The Buffalo History Museum.

Diplomatic posts
Preceded by John R. G. Pitkin	United States Minister to Argentina; 1894–1899	Succeeded by William Paine Lord
Preceded by Inaugural holder	United States Minister to Panama; 1903–1904	Succeeded by John Barrett
