= Sioux City Symphony Orchestra =

American orchestra based in Sioux City, Iowa

The Sioux City Symphony Orchestra is an American orchestra based in Sioux City, Iowa. Its home is the Orpheum Theater.

== History ==
The Sioux City Symphony Orchestra and The Sioux City Municipal Band were each formed in the early 1930s under the guidance and direction of Leo Kucinski. Under Kucinski's leadership, the orchestra gradually developed into a highly respected, paid-professional Class B civic orchestra with a regular performing season. The orchestra originally performed in the Sioux City Municipal Auditorium, but in 2001 moved to the restored historic Orpheum Theater.

The Municipal Band, with close kinship to the orchestra, is also a paid-professional group that traces its origins to The Monahan Post 64 Band of the American Legion, in the 1920s. The Monahan Post Band became world-famous when it was selected as the "official" band of the American Legion in the mid-1920s. From its founding until the early 1930s, The Monahan Post Band made several tours that included concert appearances in New York City, New Orleans and Paris. The home of the Municipal Band is the city band shell in Grandview Park.

In the 1930s, Leo Kucinski collaborated with Superintendent of Schools M.G. Clark to establish the foundation for the public school system's music program, which, along with the music program of Morningside University (formerly Morningside College), have created strong community support for the Orchestra.

After Kucinski, other music directors of the orchestra have included Thomas Lewis, Stephen Rogers Radcliffe and Xian Zhang. Xian Zhang had originally been contracted to the orchestra for 3 years, but resigned after 2 years because of her schedule demands. In March 2009, the orchestra announced the appointment of Ryan Haskins as its next music director, as of 1 July 2009.

== Music directors ==
- Leo Kucinski (1925–1977)
- Thomas Lewis (1977–1994)
- Stephen Rogers Radcliffe (1995–2004)
- Xian Zhang (2005–2007)
- JungHo Kim (interim director 2008)
- Ryan Haskins (2009–present)
