= Dan Iordăchescu =

Romanian baritone (1930–2015)

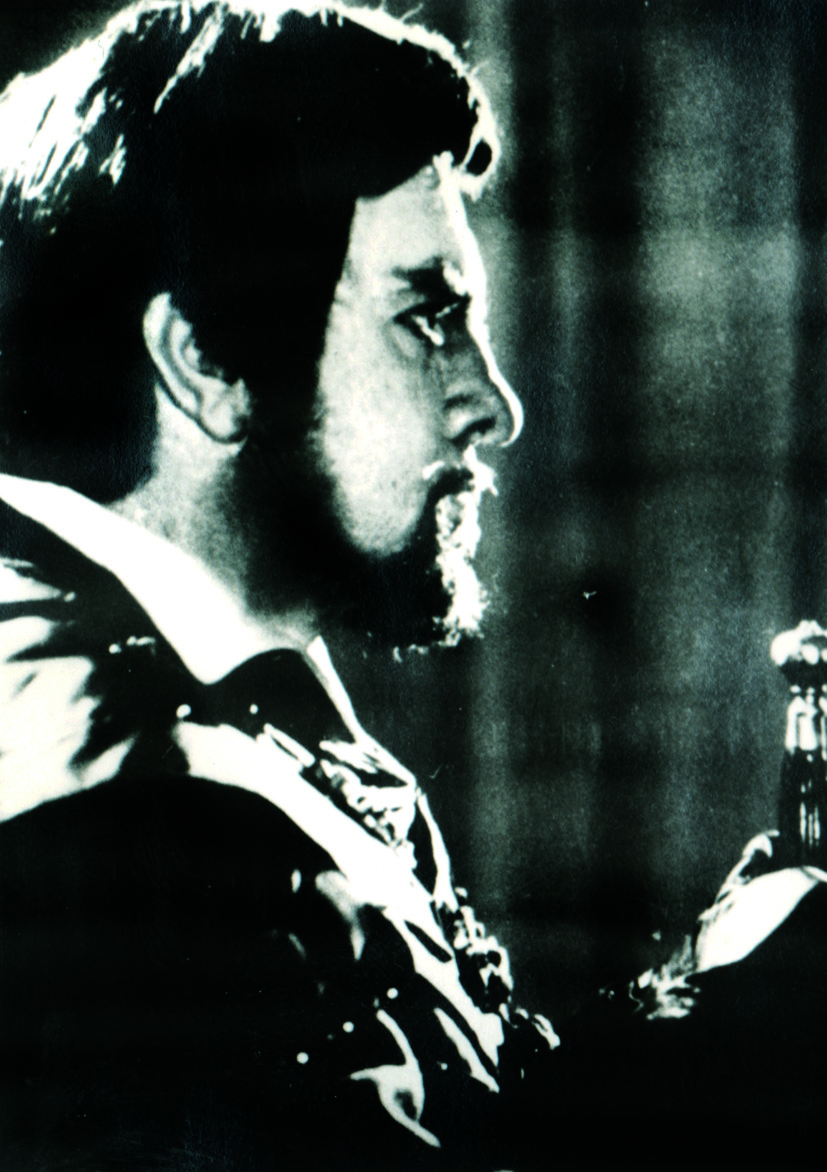

Dan Iordăchescu (Romanian pronunciation: [ˈdan jordəˈcesku]; 2 June 1930 – 30 August 2015) was a Romanian baritone. A native of Vânju Mare, he was the father of opera singers Cristina Iordachescu, Irina Iordachescu and Raluca Iordachescu. He was active in various countries for a number of years and has received awards.

He is the author of two books of autobiography: Un drumeț al cântului [A Journey of Singing], Editura Eminescu, București, 1990 ISBN 973-22-0147-9; and Postscriptum la o carte cenzurată [Postscript to a censored book].
