= Xian Zhang (conductor) =

Chinese-American conductor

Xian Zhang (Chinese: 张弦, Zhang Xian; born 1973) is a Chinese-American conductor. She is currently the music director of the New Jersey Symphony Orchestra (NJSO) and the music director of the Seattle Symphony. Zhang previously served as the music director of the Orchestra Sinfonica di Milano Giuseppe Verdi, becoming the first woman appointed as music director of a major Italian symphony orchestra. She was also the first female conductor to hold a titled role with a BBC orchestra, serving as principal guest conductor of the BBC National Orchestra of Wales.

== Early life and education ==
Zhang was born into a musical family in Dandong, Liaoning, China. During the Cultural Revolution, when Western instruments were scarce, her father – a trained luthier – built a piano by hand so that she could learn music. She began piano lessons with her mother at age three and was practicing up to eight hours a day by elementary school. At age eleven, Zhang was accepted into the pre-college program at the Central Conservatory of Music in Beijing, where she later earned her bachelor’s and master’s degrees in music. Initially trained as a pianist, she switched to conducting in her teens after a teacher noted her small hands would limit her piano career. She studied conducting under Professor Wu Lingfen, one of China’s pioneering female conductors.

Zhang’s conducting debut occurred unexpectedly at age 20, when she was asked to substitute for her teacher at rehearsals of Mozart's Marriage of Figaro at the Central Opera House in Beijing.

Zhang moved to the United States in 1998. She pursued her doctoral studies at the University of Cincinnati College-Conservatory of Music, where she earned a Doctor of Musical Arts (DMA) degree. Subsequently, she became the youngest faculty member in the institution's history, serving as director of the Conservatory's Concert Orchestra from 2000 to 2004.

== Conducting career ==
=== Early career ===
Zhang’s international career was launched in 2002 when she won first prize in the inaugural Maazel-Vilar Conductor's Competition, judged by a panel led by maestro Lorin Maazel. Later that year, Maazel – then music director of the New York Philharmonic – invited Zhang to join the Philharmonic as a cover conductor for the 2002–03 and 2003–04 seasons. Zhang made her debut with the New York Philharmonic in February 2004, leading a Young People’s Concert. In September 2004, she was appointed as the Philharmonic’s assistant conductor, and subsequently, in 2005, was promoted to associate conductor, becoming the first holder of the orchestra’s newly created Arturo Toscanini Chair.

Zhang served as the music director of the Sioux City Symphony Orchestra from 2005 to 2007. She balanced this role with her New York Philharmonic duties until resigning the Sioux City position in 2007 due to her increasingly busy international schedule.

=== International work ===
In January 2008, Zhang became the first woman to conduct the Staatskapelle Dresden in its principal hall. In March 2009, the Orchestra Sinfonica di Milano Giuseppe Verdi appointed Zhang as its music director, making her the first woman to hold such a position with an Italian symphony orchestra. Her tenure began with the 2009–2010 season and continued through 2016. In December 2010, the Nederlandse Orkest- en Ensemble-Academie (NJO; Dutch Orchestra and Ensemble Academy) named Zhang its artistic leader, as of the summer of 2011.

=== New Jersey Symphony ===
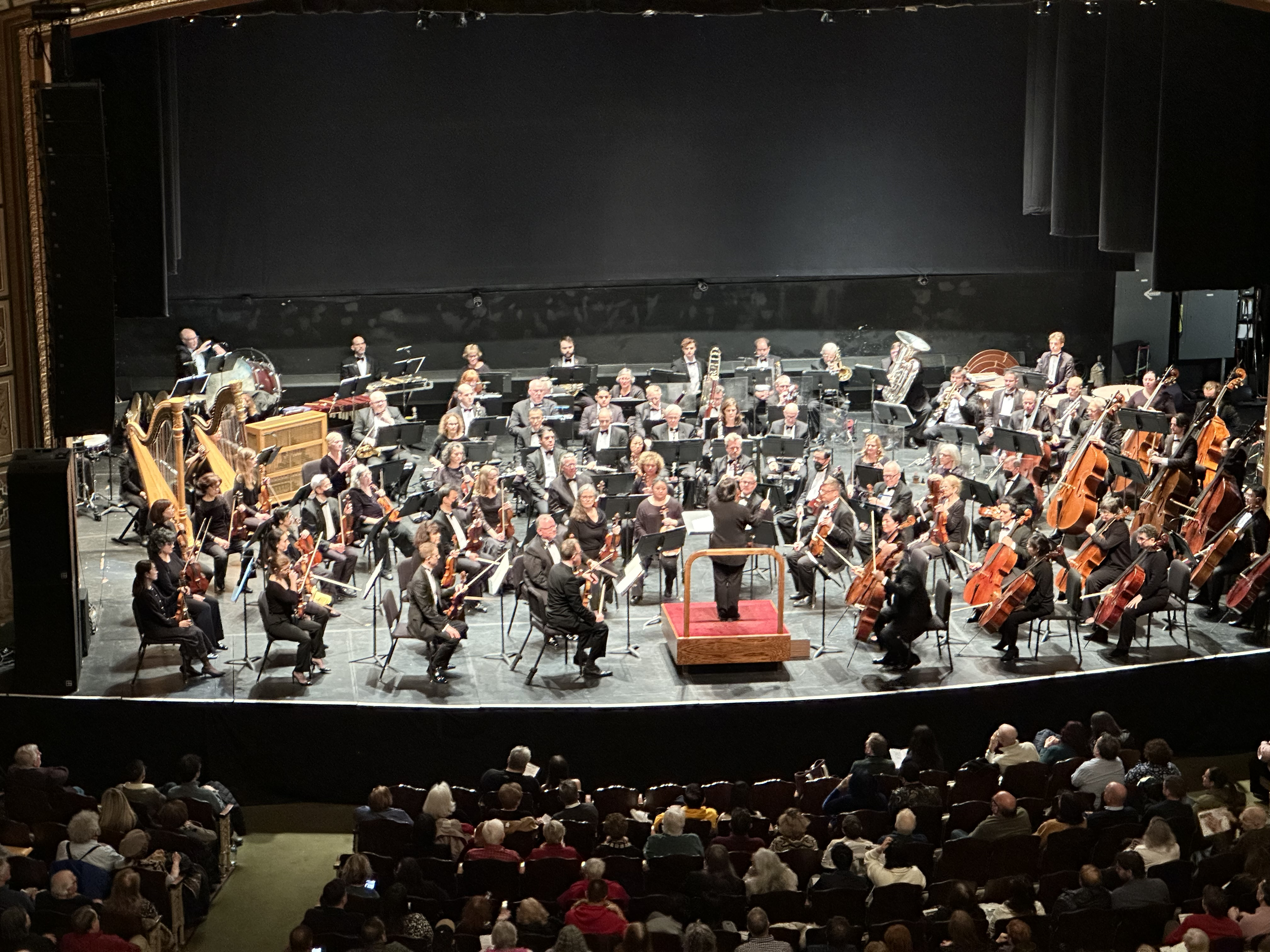
Zhang conducting the New Jersey Symphony Orchestra in 2024

Zhang first guest-conducted the New Jersey Symphony Orchestra (NJSO) in 2010, and returned for further guest appearances in February 2012 and May 2015. In November 2015, the NJSO announced her appointment as its 14th music director, effective in September 2016, with an initial contract of four years. She is the first female music director of the NJSO. In March 2022, the NJSO announced the second extension of her contract, through the 2027–2028 season. Zhang is scheduled to conclude her NJSO tenure at the close of the 2027-2028 season.

=== Seattle Symphony ===
Zhang first guest-conducted the Seattle Symphony in June 2008, and returned as a guest conductor several times, including in 2020 and in 2021. In September 2024, the Seattle Symphony announced the appointment of Zhang as its next music director, effective with the 2025-2026 season, with an initial contract of five years. She took the title of music director-designate with immediate effect. Zhang is the first female conductor to be named music director of the Seattle Symphony.

=== Additional conducting posts ===
In December 2015, the BBC National Orchestra of Wales (BBC NOW) announced Zhang's appointment as its next principal guest conductor, effective with the 2016–2017 season, with an initial contract of three years. She was the first titled conductor with a BBC orchestra. In her capacity with the BBC NOW, Zhang was the first woman conductor to conduct the annual Prom which includes the Symphony No. 9 of Beethoven on 30 July 2017. In 2019, Zhang was announced as principal guest conductor of the Melbourne Symphony Orchestra, beginning in 2020. In September 2025, the China National Center for the Performing Arts Orchestra announced the appointment of Zhang as its next principal guest conductor.

== Awards and recognition ==
Zhang conducted the Philadelphia Orchestra and Time for Three on the album "Letters for the Future," which won multiple Grammy awards in 2023, including Best Contemporary Classical Composition for Kevin Puts' "Contact" and Best Classical Instrumental Solo.

In 2023, Zhang was awarded an honorary doctorate from The Juilliard School.

== Personal life ==
Zhang and her husband Lei Yang have two sons.

Cultural offices
Preceded by Stephen Rogers Radcliffe	Music Director, Sioux City Symphony Orchestra; 2005–2007	Succeeded by Ryan Haskins
Preceded by Riccardo Chailly	Music Director, Orchestra Sinfonica di Milano Giuseppe Verdi; 2009–2016	Succeeded by Claus Peter Flor
Preceded by Reinbert de Leeuw	Artistic Director, Nederlandse Orkest- en Ensemble-Academie; 2011–2015	Succeeded by Ewout van Dingstee (director and artistic manager) and Antony Hermus (artistic adviser)
Preceded by Jacques Lacombe	Music Director, New Jersey Symphony Orchestra; 2016–present	Succeeded by incumbent
