= Academy of Music (Sioux City, Iowa) =

Defunct theater in Sioux City, Iowa, U.S.

The Academy of Music is a defunct theater that operated in Sioux City, Iowa, from 1870 through the 1880s. It was a successful venture that held performances and lectures. The first manager was Selden Irwin, followed by William I. Buchanan. The Academy of Music closed due to maintenance issues and available space, leading to the construction of the Peavey Grand Opera House in 1888.

== Founding ==
In 1870, the Sioux City businessmen Judge A. W. Hubbard, J. C. C. Hoskins, and T. J. Stone wanted to build a brick building that allowed others to rent part of the building. Some people were against it being built due to the belief that the building would not properly show Sioux City's economy and culture. An unknown writer said in the Sioux City Times that they wanted to convince the businessmen that the building would be better suited as a theater and would be profitable. The writer worked with others to compile information that would help their case and the group met with the businessmen. Hubbard and Hoskins agreed with the group's idea, with the group later meeting with Stone in private. They convinced Stone to write to his friends in Omaha, Nebraska, who operated an Academy of Music there and Stone's friends agreed with using part of the building as a theater. Selden Irwin, a stage manager in Omaha, was hired to manage the theater in 1870 which was then named Hubbard Hall. Irwin was also an actor and part of the Selden Irwin Combination that toured through parts of the United States. Irwin's group first performed at the theater on June 2, 1870. Irwin rented the theater yearly for $15,000. In December 1870, Hubbard Hall was renamed the Academy of Music.

== New building ==
St. Louis architect William Angelo Powell designed a new four-story building for the Academy of Music. The building began showing performances on January 14, 1871, starting with The Serious Family and A Day in Paris. The theater hall was 27 feet (8.2 m) tall with a floor and balcony that could seat 800 people. The stage scenery was able to be moved by offstage machinery and lamps did not need to be extinguished to be darkened. The drop curtain contained an image of Venice, Italy. Irwin and his wife performed there several times in 1870 and 1871, with Mrs. Irwin receiving much praise. Although some newspapers criticized the performers, most articles tried to raise the attendance through reviews. The reviews helped show that Sioux City was a progressive community for later residents. Irwin along with his wife, stepson, sister, daughter, and some other people had to cut scripts and often perform up to three roles during a play. The Academy of Music employed locals and they tried to hire well-known talent. The Selden Irwin Combination acted, painted, built things, worked the lights, cleaned, publicized, allowed others to rent their costumes, gave space, and provided advice. The theater was able to thrive due to Irwin's ability to adapt to changes. The building also contained offices including a post office. Women's rights activist Susan B. Anthony spoke twice at the Academy of Music in the 1870s.

== New management and closure ==
After Irwin and his family left the theater in 1872, businessmen took over the Academy of Music and they focused on acts coming from other cities. Although Sioux City became prosperous from the late 1870s to the 1880s, the Academy of Music began to lose business. Complaints against the theater included damaged scenery, bad ventilation, cold air, not much room, and seats not allowing a good view of the onstage performances. William I. Buchanan became the manager and he booked opera performers as well as lecturers such as Robert G. Ingersoll, Henry Ward Beecher, and Harper's Weekly cartoonist Thomas Nast. The Academy of Music closed at some point shortly after.

Businessman Arthur Samuel Garretson wanted to build a new opera house, but the plan failed. In 1886, Garretson and three other businessmen attempted the idea again by backing the project themselves. They opened the Peavey Grand Opera House on September 24, 1888, and it ended in 1919. `
