= John R. G. Pitkin =

American diplomat

John Robert Graham Pitkin

13th United States Minister to Argentina
- In office October 31, 1889 – August 15, 1893
- Preceded by: Bayless W. Hanna
- Succeeded by: William I. Buchanan

Personal details
- Born: 1840-1841 New Orleans, Louisiana
- Died: July 4, 1901 New Orleans, Louisiana
- Party: Republican
- Children: Helen Pitkin
- Education: University of Louisiana

Military service
- Allegiance: Confederate States of America
- Branch/service: Crescent Infantry Regiment
- Rank: Private
- Battles/wars: American Civil War

John Robert Graham Pitkin, also known as John R. G. Pitkin, (1840-1841 – July 4, 1901) was an American diplomat and soldier.

== Biography ==
Pitkin was born in either 1840 or 1841 in New Orleans, Louisiana. He would study at the University of Louisiana, and was admitted to the bar in 1861.

Following his graduation, Pitkin would practice law while serving as a school principal in New Orleans between the years of 1861 to 1863. During the Civil War, he would find himself briefly serving as a private in Louisiana's Crescent Regiment, beginning on February 18, 1863. However, after the fall of New Orleans, he publicly declared himself a Republican and Unionist, earning him a position in the Reconstruction. He would participate in the Southern Loyalist convention, held in Philadelphia in 1866, and would serve as a Republican campaign speaker.

Pitkin had a daughter on August 8, 1877, in New Orleans, Louisiana named Helen. She would go on to become a staff writer for the Louisiana paper, the Times-Democrat.

In 1877 Pitkin was nominated to be marshal of the United States for the eastern district of Louisiana; he would hold the position for one year. Later in 1882, he would take the position back up.

Pitkin served as the United States' Envoy Extraordinary and Minister Plenipotentiary to Argentina from 1889 to 1893.

The last government position that Pitkin would hold would be postmaster of New Orleans, which he served as between 1898 and 1900. He resigned from this position amid a blackmail scandal involving his secretary.

Pitkin died in New Orleans on July 4, 1901.
