= Really Wild Animals =

- Genre: Nature documentary
- Created by: Andrew Carl Wilk
- Voices of: Dudley Moore; Billy West
- Theme music composer: Darryl Kubian
- Composers: Alan O'Day and Janis Liebhart (songs); Darryl Kubian (score)
- Original language: English
- No. of episodes: 13; 26 (TV version)

Production
- Executive producer: Andrew Carl Wilk
- Running time: 45 minutes; 23 minutes (TV version)
- Production company: National Geographic Society

Original release
- Network: Direct-to-video
- Release: March 2, 1994 – October 21, 1997

Really Wild Animals is an American direct-to-video children's nature television series, hosted by Dudley Moore as Spin, an anthropomorphic globe. Comprising 13 episodes, it was released between March 2, 1994 and October 21, 1997. It was nominated for five national Daytime Emmy Awards and won one.

Released by the National Geographic Society, the series educates children about many different species of animals. It goes to every continent, describing the wildlife on each one and also focuses on one specific group of animals, such as dogs, cats, endangered animals, and animals from Asia, North America, the tropical rainforests of Central and South America, the world's four great oceans, the Australian Outback and the African savanna.

Songs were written, produced, and mostly performed by Alan O'Day and Janis Liebhart. At the end of each episode, Spin says, "But (you know), there are lots more Really Wild Animals all across this wonderful world of ours, so be sure to join me on our next (exciting) adventure. Until then, this is your pal Spin. Spin ya later!".

== Episodes ==
The series was originally released on VHS, and on August 2, 2005, National Geographic began releasing the series' episodes on DVD.

No.	Title	Original release date
1	"Swinging Safari"	March 2, 1994
This episode features animals from Africa, primarily in the Serengeti, but also the Congolian rainforests (the jungles of the Congo Basin) and in mid-Africa, the Kalahari Desert, and Botswana's Central Kalahari Game Reserve. These animals include elephants, hippopotamuses, rhinoceroses, giraffes, zebras, chimpanzees, black-and-white colobus monkeys, meerkats, cheetahs, and lions. The law of survival and the food chain are also emphasized. Jane Goodall and Daphne Sheldrick also appear as guest stars. There are five songs. The first is about lions ("Hey Lion"); the second is about baby animals ("Young Thing"); the third is about how humans, monkeys, and apes are related ("Family"); the fourth is about zebras ("Stripes"), and the fifth is about Africa's beauty ("The Heart That Beats in Africa") and sung by Dorian Holley. Note: The first three episodes were produced in 1993. The DVD version omits the "Weather Update", "Traffic Update", "Africa's Most Wanted" and "As the Earth Turns" signs.
2	"Wonders Down Under"	March 2, 1994
In this episode, the animals of Australia are examined. The theme of "weirdness" among Australia's creatures (compared to the rest of the world) is explored by looking at mammals, birds, fish, amphibians and reptiles. The kangaroos, mudskippers, quolls, fruit bats, echidnas, platypuses, riflebirds, bowerbirds, lyrebirds, emus, malleefowls, frilled lizards, water-holding frogs, dingoes, Tasmanian devils, flying possums, numbats, thorny devils, and koalas are featured. There are five songs. The first is about Australia and how unique it is ("Down Under"); the second is about kangaroos ("Wait Up, Kangaroo"); the third is about Australia's strange animals ("Proud to Be Strange"); the fourth is about the Outback's reptiles and amphibians ("Tracks in the Sand"); and the fifth is about how despite the "strange" appearances, Australia's animals make it a unique and wonderful land ("Strange New Friend").
3	"Deep Sea Dive"	March 2, 1994
This episode plunges into the world's oceans and explores underwater life. Key destinations include the Great Barrier Reef and Antarctica. Some of the animals featured are dolphins, octopuses, seahorses, fish, cuttlefish, jellyfish, sea otters, sharks, emperor penguins and whales. It also attempts to capture the wonders of the sea and the importance of protecting it from pollution. There are five songs. The first is about water ("Water"); the second is about strange animals that live deep in the sea ("City of the Creeps"); the third is about the importance of keeping the water clean ("If the Water is Clear"); the fourth is about animal movement ("It's in the Way You Move"); and the fifth is about the "real" underwater treasure, all the wildlife ("I Found a Treasure"). Note: This is the first episode Spin explores the world instead of just sticking to one continent, and the last episode Caesar Video Graphics animated.
4	"Totally Tropical Rain Forest"	July 27, 1994
This episode shows an in-depth look at the rainforests of Central and South America. It is structured around a journey through the layers of the forest, from the floor to the mid-layers to the canopy. During this journey, the jaguar, tapir, leafcutter ant, howler monkey, basilisk lizard, poison arrow frog, parrot, tarantula, harpy eagle, piranha, vampire bat, hoatzin, uakari, three-toed sloth, and river dolphin are among the animals shown. Environmental issues surrounding deforestation are also looked at. There are four songs. The first is about all the life that lives in the rainforest ("Greenhouse"); the second is about the importance of finding food and the food chain ("What Do You Want for Lunch"); the third is about the rainforest canopy and all the birds that call it home ("Bird's-Eye View"), and the fourth is about the importance of keeping the rainforest safe ("This Must Be the Place"). Note: This is the first episode animated by Click 3X, and the change in studios resulted in Spin being redesigned. The end has a prototype animation in which Spin doesn't put away his magnifying glass at the end; he zooms in.
5	"Amazing North America"	July 27, 1994
This episode looks at North America's ecosystems from its deserts and swamps to its cities and tundra. Ground squirrels, rattlesnakes, beavers, raccoons, woodpeckers, corn snakes, alligators, red-bellied turtles, Arctic wolves, musk oxen, polar bears and black bears are all featured. The diversity of the North American landscape and how its animals have adapted are key points. There are four songs. The first is about what animals need to do to survive in North America ("I Gotta Be Wild"); the second is about the places animals call home ("Look Who's Moving In"); the third is about difficulties in getting what animals want ("To Get What You Want"), and the fourth is about the winter season ("Winter").
6	"Adventures in Asia"	July 27, 1994
The immense continent of Asia is explored. With such a large area to cover, Spin jumps from one place to the next, including the tropical islands of Indonesia, the Arabian Peninsula, Russian mountains, Japanese mountains, Indian jungles, and Chinese forests and mountains. Some of the featured animals are the sea snake, white-bellied sea eagle, snow monkey, proboscis monkey, mudskipper, fiddler crab, dhole, Asian elephant, tiger, Komodo dragon, cobra, Arabian oryx, ibex, camel, garden eel, manta ray, giant panda, crane, swiftlet, and orangutan. The difference between myth and reality is tested in uncovering the lifestyles of all these creatures. There are four songs. The first is about all the Asian legends and how much truth is in them ("Legends in Asia"); the second is about territories ("Get Off of My Turf"); the third is about animal roughhousing and its importance ("Roughhouse"); and the fourth is about all the life, human and animal, in Asia ("Keep the Legends Alive").
7	"Polar Prowl"	1994 (educational market); August 27, 1996 (mainstream)
In this episode, Spin takes viewers on a trip to the Arctic and Antarctic. Animals such as polar bears, walruses, orcas, caribou, musk oxen, Kodiak bears, Arctic terns, penguins, seals, and humpback whales are explored. Additionally, they examine the three ways animals survive the harsh cold: hibernation, insulation, and migration. There are four songs. The first is about the cold temperatures and how the animals survive ("Cold, Cold, Cold"); the second is about ways animals beat the cold ("That's the Way We Do It Up Here"); the third is about penguins, and names the 17 species ("Penguins"), and the fourth is a tribute to Antarctica ("The Last Great Wilderness").
8	"Hot Dogs and Cool Cats"	1995 (educational market)
Spin first presents at dogs and tries to determine if there is a link between wild and tame dogs. The first song is about why dogs do what they do ("Hey Dog"), and the second is about dogs' loyalty ("Best Friends"). Spin then introduces cats and learns that no matter how tame, they are always wild. The first song is about cats having an attitude ("The Cat's Got an Attitude"), and the second is about how they are wild inside ("Wild Inside"). Note: Due to Really Wild Animals now being available for television broadcast, all episodes beginning with this one contain two half-hour segments, each featuring two songs. A bridging dog commercial between the two episodes is removed from the DVD version. The second part is also the first time Alan O'Day does not appear.
9	"Dinosaurs and Other Creature Features"	August 27, 1996
Spin introduces dinosaurs such as duck-billed Hadrosaurs, Struthiomimus, Tyrannosaurus rex, and Dromaeosaurs (Raptors), and tries to answer the questions surrounding them, including how they became extinct, and if relatives still exist such as alligators, snakes, Komodo dragons, lizards, ostriches, and cassowaries. The first song focuses on dinosaurs ("Dinosaurs"), and the second shows how their modern-day relatives still "rock our world" ("We're Gonna Rock Your World"). Spin then presents some of the world's creepiest creatures, such as vampire bats, ants, flies, spiders, dung beetles and vultures. He shows that no matter how scary they are, they all play an important part in the world. The first song is about how creatures are creepy and intriguing ("Creepy Creatures", animation by Jim and Vezna Tozzi), and the second is about how important they are ("Keep on Creepin' On"). Notes: This is the first episode where the background changes from the sky to outer space, which will remain for the rest of the series. Also, Spin reads the title card as "Dinos and Other Creature Features" and footage from Phil Tippett's Prehistoric Beast and Dinosaur! are used for the dinosaur scenes. Paleontologist Robert T. Bakker appears to discuss prehistoric animals. Multiple classic films and shows have footage borrowed: several shots from the 1925 film The Lost World were used, along with a clip from the 1933 King Kong film, footage from the Three Stooges episode "Disorder in the Court", and a clip from Killer Shrews.
10	"Monkey Business and Other Family Fun"	August 27, 1996
Spin shows primates, including gibbons, langurs, bush babies, aye-ayes, capuchins, and baboons. He also explains that primates are our distant relatives. The first song is about all primates ("Primates"), and the second is about gorillas, our "gentle brothers" ("Gentle Brother"). Spin shows animal families, including elephants, bullfrogs, ostriches, octopuses, albatrosses, and sea turtles and shows they are not all that different from human families. The first song is about how curious animal children are ("I'm Curious"), and the second is about how important families are ("You're My Family"). Note: This episode features a parody of Candid Camera called "Candid Critter Camera" hosted by "Alan Grunt" (a parody of Allen Funt), who is played by Billy West. A "Candid Critter Camera" segment between the two episodes involving meerkats is removed from the DVD version.
11	"Farmyard Friends"	1997
Spin introduces farm animals, such as turkeys, pigs, sheep, horses, and cows, and examines their wild relatives, such as dall sheep, wild turkeys, warthogs, and zebras, from all over the world. The first song is about all the animals on the farm ("Farmer, Farmer"), and the second is about whether the viewer would be wild or tame ("Would You Rather be Wild, Would You Rather be Tame"). Spin then shows humans helping endangered animals, how animals rescue people, and if people work together to save animals, they will prevent them from becoming extinct. The first song is about help being available for animals ("Help is on the Way"), and the second is about humans working to save animals ("Safe at Last"). Notes: This first part does not mention the second segment. The TV version of "Farmyard Friends" was titled "Spin's Really Wild Farm Tour". Warner Home Video became the series' home video distributor and started advertising before the episode began.
12	"Awesome Animal Builders"	1997
It shows how animals build their own homes, such as termites, beavers, orb-weaver spiders, swiftlets, bees, silkworms, caterpillars, weaver birds, naked mole rats, and ospreys, and explains that they build their homes to have families. The first song is about the different kinds of animal homes ("Anything to Make it Home"), and the second is about why animals build homes ("I Am an Architect"). Spin takes us to look at animals that migrate, such as wildebeest, sockeye salmon, tundra swans, African elephants, geese, sharks, rays, pronghorn and toads. It explains that the cycle of migration never ends. The first song is about animals migrating ("I'm Movin' Out"), and the second is about how migration never ends for animals ("Every Ending is a Beginning").
13	"Secret Weapons and Great Escapes"	October 21, 1997
Spin is a spy who is trying to find out and show how some animals have ways to defend themselves, such as frilled-neck lizards, poison dart frogs, owl butterflies, green tree pythons, Hemisphaerota beetles, army ants, skunks, Surinam toads, black widow spiders, bombardier beetles, mantis shrimp, cobras, tomato frogs, cone snails, and puffer fish, and finds out why animals need defenses. The first song is about animals having secret defenses ("I've Got a Secret"), and the second is about animals needing to watch out for other animals' defenses ("Trick of the Trade"). Spin shows animals that live on islands, such as lemurs and chameleons in Madagascar, marine and land iguanas in the Galápagos, Tasmanian devils and quolls in Tasmania, gannets and keas in New Zealand, fur seals on the Juan Fernández Islands and eastern rockhopper penguins with Snares penguins in Snares Island, and shows how unique they are. We also see a little bit of Central Park in New York City, where we also see herons and egrets on the harbor's islands. Both songs are about islands and how unique they are ("Welcome to the Islands" and "It's a World Within a World").

== Television broadcast ==
On February 18, 1995, Really Wild Animals was announced to be part of CBS' Saturday morning schedule for that fall. The series made its television premiere on CBS on September 16 at 12:30PM Eastern. CBS aired each of the first seven episodes in two half-hour parts. These episodes were rerun on the Disney Channel from January 5 to October 19, 1997. All episodes were shown on WAM! America's Kidz Network from 1999 to 2001.
