= Philip James =

American conductor and composer (1890–1975)

Philip Frederick Wright James (May 17, 1890 – November 1, 1975) was an American composer, conductor and music educator.

== Life ==
James was born in Jersey City, New Jersey. At an early age he began piano, violin and theory lessons, and served as choirboy in several New Jersey churches. From 1904 to 1909 he studied organ with J. Warren Andrews and in 1907 began advanced harmony and counterpoint lessons with Homer Norris.

In World War I James played in and subsequently became bandleader of the American Expeditionary Forces Headquarters Band. Victor Herbert heard his work with the band and upon James' discharge from the Army hired him as musical director for his musical comedy My Golden Girl.

In 1921 James co-founded and became the first conductor of the New Jersey Symphony Orchestra. From 1929 to 1936 James was conductor of the Bamberger Symphony, broadcast weekly over radio station WOR in New York.

In 1923 James began a long teaching career at New York University, serving as head of the music department from 1934 until his retirement in 1956. His students at NYU included Milton Babbitt, Bernard Herrmann, and Marvin David Levy.

In 1932 he won a $5000 prize from NBC for his satirical composition Station WGZBX, which subsequently received performances by many major orchestras. Other prize-winning compositions from the 1930s include his Bret Harte Overture and Song of the Night. His Suite for String Orchestra won the 1938 Juilliard prize.

In 1939, he conducted the Naumburg Orchestral Concerts, in the Naumburg Bandshell, Central Park, in the summer series.

Though he remained active as a composer until his death in 1975, James' larger-scale compositions were infrequently played after the mid-twentieth century. However several of his early compositions, including Meditation a Ste. Clotilde for organ and the anthem By the Waters of Babylon, remain in the repertoire.

== Selected works ==
=== Orchestra ===
- Song of the Night (1931)
- Station WGZBX (1932)
- Bret Harte Overture (1934)
- Sinfonietta (1938)
- Brennan on the Moor (1940)
- Symphony #1 (1943)
- Symphony #2 (1946)
- Miniver Cheevy (1947)
- Richard Cory (1947)
- Overture to a Greek Play (1952)

=== Band ===
- Colonel Averill March (1917)
- Festal March "Perstare et Praestare" (1942)
- E.F.G. Overture (1944)
- Fanfare and Ceremonial (1955)

=== Chamber orchestra ===
- String Quartet (1924)
- Kammersymphonie (1926)
- Suite for String Orchestra (1933)
- Suite for Woodwind Quintet (1936)
- Piano Quartet (1937)

=== Piano solo ===
- Twelve Piano Preludes (1951)

=== Organ solo ===
- Meditation a Sainte Clotilde (1916)
- First Organ Sonata (1929)
- Pantomime (1941)
- Galarnad (1946)
- Alleluia-Toccata (1949)
- Pastorale (1949)
- Solemn Prelude (1956)

=== Choral ===
- By the Waters of Babylon (1920)
- General William Booth Enters into Heaven (1932)
- Psalm 150 (1940)
- Psalm 149 (1959)
- Chorus of Shepherds and Angels (1956)
- To Cecilia (1966)
