= Daniel Klajner =

Swiss conductor (born 1963)

Daniel Klajner (born 26 December 1963) is a Swiss conductor.

== Life ==
Born in Bülach (Switzerland), Klajner studied conducting and musical composition in Vienna. He completed his musical training with Gary Bertini (in Salzburg), Moshe Atzmon (in Assisi) and Leonard Bernstein (Tanglewood and Tel Aviv). He was assistant to the latter at the Vienna State Opera and to Claudio Abbado at the Berlin Philharmonic and the Salzburg Festival.

Klajner has won several international competitions (Min-On competition in Tokyo, Masterplayer in Lugano, Vienna Chamber Orchestra and Jecklin competitions in Zurich).

He began his career as first Kapellmeister in Bienne (Switzerland) before being appointed Generalmusikdirektor in Stralsund in Western Pomerania at the age of 26 and then, from 1996 to 1998, he held the same position in Hof, Bavaria and, from 2000 to 2005 in Würzburg (Bavaria) where he was also artistic director of the Mozart Festival.

At the same time, he is pursuing an international career: as a permanent guest conductor at Dortmund and the Bern Opera, he also conducted the Stuttgarter Kammerorchester on a tour of Spain, the Vienna Chamber Orchestra on a tour of Austria and performs regularly in Japan and the United States.

He made his debut at the Paris Opera in 2002 with Rolf Liebermann's Freispruch für Medea, at La Scala of Milan in 2004 (Der Fliegende Holländer) and at the Glyndebourne Festival Opera in 2005.

In concert, he has conducted, among other things, the Orchestre de Paris, the Orchestre de la Suisse Romande, the Orchestre national du Capitole de Toulouse, the Orchestre National Bordeaux Aquitaine, the Nordwestdeutsche Philharmonie, the Tokyo Philharmonic Orchestra, the Tonhalle Orchester Zürich, the Bavarian Radio Symphony Orchestra, the Orchestre national des Pays de la Loire, and also the Orchestre philharmonique de Marseille.

In the pit, he directed Der fliegende Holländer, La Bohème in Paris, Bluebeard's Castle, Turandot in Marseille, Don Giovanni in Toulouse, Madama Butterfly at the Komische Oper Berlin, Der fliegende Holländer, The Magic Flute, Tannhäuser at the Deutsche Oper Berlin, Rigoletto in Düsseldorf, Die tote Stadt in Nancy, Don Carlos in Innsbruck, Aribert Reimann's Troades, Freispruch für Medea de Liebermann, Cendrillon in Bern, and Parsifal in Darmstadt.

At the Opéra national du Rhin, half of whose performances are given by the Orchestre symphonique de Mulhouse, he conducted the French premiere of Thomas Adès' The Tempest, The Nightingale and Œdipus Rex, Elektra, Frühlings Erwachen, Richard III, Ariadne auf Naxos, the ballets Romeo and Juliet and La Sylphide.

From 2005 to 2011, he was music and artistic director of the Orchestre symphonique de Mulhouse and since the 2010–2011 season, he has been principal Guest Conductor of the Hofer Symphoniker.

He has been teaching orchestral conducting at the Vienna Conservatory as a guest professor since 2002.

== Discography ==
With the Orchestre symphonique de Mulhouse, he has recorded two albums: one dedicated to the French and Italian lyrical repertoire with Maria-Riccarda Wesseling, the other in homage to Norbert Glanzberg.

=== External links ===
- Daniel Klajner Boris Orlob Management
- Website of the Orchestre symphonique de Mulhouse
- klassik.com. "klassik.com : Daniel Klajner macht Karriere bei Theater Nordhausen".
- Versprisch mir eins... conductor: Daniel Klajner (YouTube)
