= Orchestre National de Mulhouse =

The Orchestre National de Mulhouse is a French symphonic orchestra based in Mulhouse, in the Alsace region. Its principal venue is La Filature.

== History ==
The Orchestre National de Mulhouse has its origins in the small municipal orchestra founded in 1867 in the Alsatian city of Mulhouse. In 1972, it became the Orchestre régional de Mulhouse. In 1979, the orchestra took the name of the Orchestre symphonique du Rhin and, finally, the Orchestre symphonique de Mulhouse. In July 2024, the orchestra was awarded the label "Orchestre national en région" by the French Ministry of Culture. Its name was hence officially changed to Orchestre National de Mulhouse in January 2025. The orchestra divides its duties between its symphonic season at La Filature and opera performances at the Opéra national du Rhin (whose services it shares with the Orchestre philharmonique de Strasbourg).

In June 2022, Christoph Koncz first guest-conducted the orchestra. In September 2022, the orchestra announced the appointment of Koncz as its next music director, effective September 2023, with an initial contract of 3 years.

== Music directors (partial list) ==
- Paul Capolongo (1975–1985)
- Luca Pfaff (1986–1996)
- Cyril Diederich (1996–2005)
- Daniel Klajner (2005–2011)
- Gwennolé Rufet (acting music and artistic director, 2011–2013)
- Patrick Davin (2013–2018)
- Jacques Lacombe (2018–2021)
- Christoph Koncz (2023–present)

== Discography ==
- Glanzberg (Holocaust Lieder, Suite Yiddish), Roman Trekel (baritone), Daniel Klajner (conductor)
- French and Italian opera arias (Rossini, Ponchielli, Leoncavallo, Saint-Saëns, Bizet) – Maria Riccarda Wesseling (mezzo-soprano), Victor Dernovski (first violin), Urmas Tammik (cello solo), Daniel Klajner (conductor)
- Chansons de toujours ("Plaisirs d’amour", "Le Temps des cerises", "La chanson des blés d’or", ...) – José van Dam (baritone), Cyril Diederich (conductor)
- Strauss / Sonzogno (Waltzes, polkas and other dances) – Luca Pfaff (conductor)
