= Christoph Koncz =

Austrian-Hungarian classical musician (born 1987)

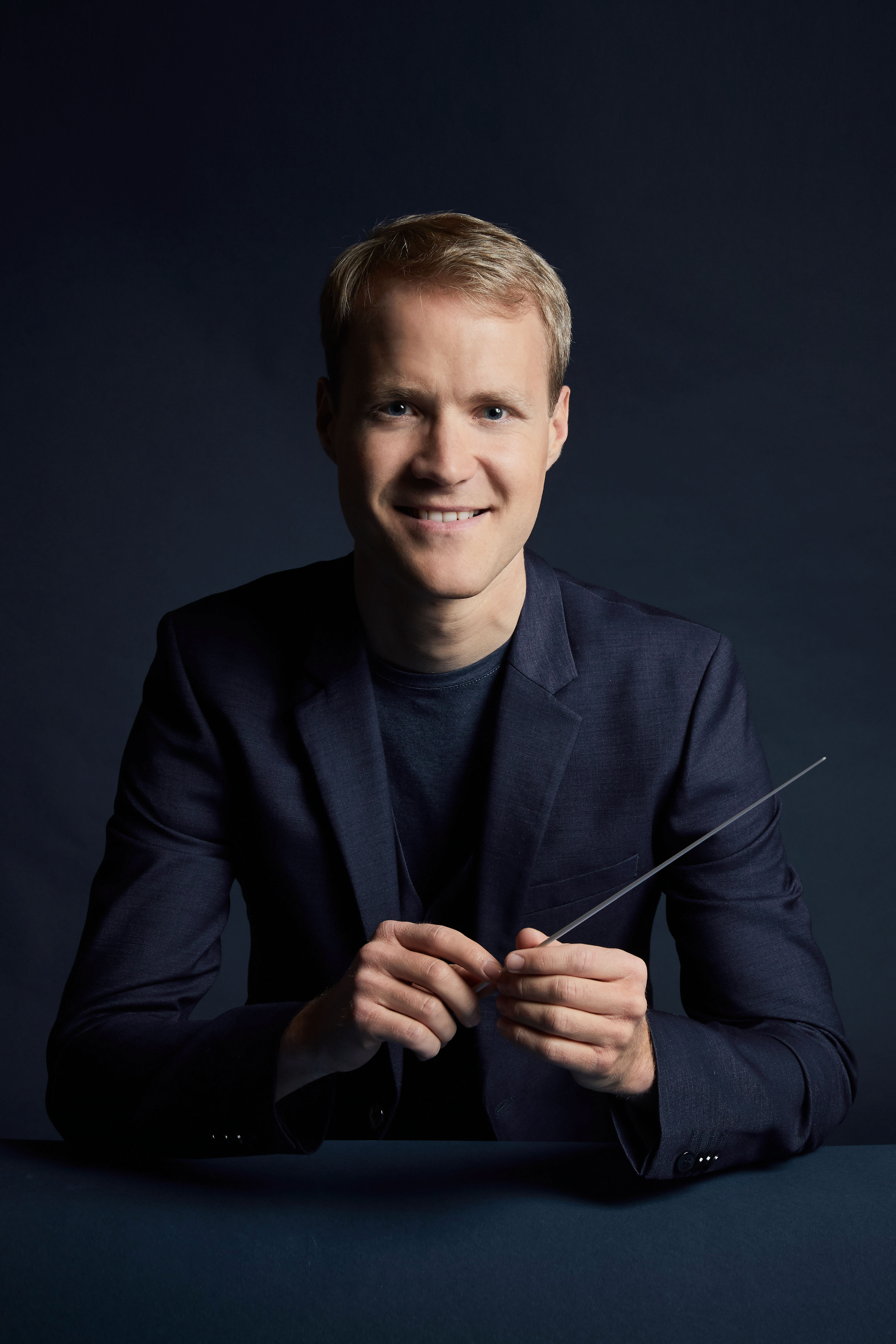
- Christoph Koncz (2020)

Background information
- Born: 3 September 1987 (age 38); Konstanz, West Germany
- Genres: Classical
- Occupations: Violinist, Conductor
- Years active: 1993–present
- Website: christophkoncz.com

Christoph Koncz (born September 3, 1987, in Konstanz) is an Austrian-Hungarian conductor, performing internationally with orchestras such as the Cleveland Orchestra, London Symphony Orchestra, Orchestre de Paris, Sächsische Staatskapelle Dresden, Orchester der Wiener Staatsoper, Mahler Chamber Orchestra, Swedish Radio Symphony Orchestra, Philharmonia Orchestra London, Orchestre de la Suisse Romande, hr‑Sinfonieorchester Frankfurt, Deutsches Symphonie-Orchester Berlin, City of Birmingham Symphony Orchestra, Orquestra Sinfônica do Estado de São Paulo, Orchestre Métropolitain de Montréal and Hong Kong Philharmonic.

Christoph Koncz will be chief conductor of the Bruckner Orchester Linz and music director of the Landestheater Linz from September 2027 onwards. He has been music director of the Orchestre National de Mulhouse since 2023 and chief conductor of the Deutsche Kammerakademie Neuss am Rhein since 2019. He has also enjoyed a close relationship with the Verbier Festival Chamber Orchestra and the renowned French period instrument ensemble Les Musiciens du Louvre.

Originally active as a violinist, Christoph Koncz was appointed principal second violin of the Vienna Philharmonic aged twenty in 2008, a position he has held until August 2023. At the age of just nine, he received worldwide acclaim for starring as child prodigy Kaspar Weiss in the Canadian feature film The Red Violin, which won the 1999 Academy Award for Best Original Score.

== Biography ==
Born in 1987 in Konstanz into an Austrian-Hungarian family of musicians, Christoph Koncz received his first violin lesson at the age of four and entered the Vienna University of Music only two years later, studying with Eugenia Polatschek. He went on to study violin with Josef Hell, Igor Ozim and Boris Kuschnir at the Music Universities of Vienna, Salzburg and Graz as well as conducting with Mark Stringer in Vienna. Master classes with Daniel Barenboim, Daniel Harding and David Zinman further enriched his musical education.

Christoph Koncz made his North American debut as a soloist aged twelve with the Montreal Symphony Orchestra conducted by Charles Dutoit, leading to collaborations with conductors such as Sir Neville Marriner, Dmitry Sitkovetsky, Gábor Takács-Nagy and Marc Minkowski. Further engagements have taken him to numerous countries across Europe and to the Middle East, Asia and Australia as well as North and South America.

Much in demand as a chamber musician, Christoph Koncz's musical partners include Leonidas Kavakos, Joshua Bell, Vilde Frang, Renaud Capuçon, Antoine Tamestit, Kim Kashkashian, Gautier Capuçon, Nicolas Altstaedt and Rudolf Buchbinder. He also performs frequently with his brother Stephan Koncz, a sought-after cellist and member of the Berlin Philharmonic. They are both recipients of the European Music Prize for Youth.

Christoph Koncz is particularly noted for his interpretations of the works by Wolfgang Amadeus Mozart. His recording of the Complete Violin Concertos as soloist and conductor with Les Musiciens du Louvre was released by Sony Classical in 2020 under the title Mozart's Violin and caused an international sensation for being the first recording of these famous works on the composer's original Baroque violin. The Strad magazine described Koncz's performance as ‘a masterly demonstration of melodic playing’.

Between 2018 and 2024, Christoph Koncz performed on the "Brüstlein" Stradivarius of 1707 on generous loan by the National Bank of Austria.

His conducting debut at the 2013 Salzburg Mozartwoche was followed by concerts at such prestigious venues as the Berlin, Cologne, Hamburg and Munich Philharmonie, Vienna Musikverein and Konzerthaus, KKL Lucerne and Concertgebouw Amsterdam as well as at the Salzburg Festival.

During the 2024/25 season, Christoph Koncz made his debuts with the Wiener Symphoniker, Israel Philharmonic Orchestra, Orchestra Sinfonica di Milano, Utah Symphony Orchestra and returned to the London Symphony Orchestra, Hong Kong Philharmonic and Orchestre Métropolitain de Montréal. He also conducted performance series of Don Giovanni at the National Theatre Prague and Die Zauberflöte at the Opera North Leeds as well as a new production of La traviata at the Opéra national du Rhin. He conducted the première of Christopher Wheeldon's narrative ballett The Winter's Tale with music by Joby Talbot at the Wiener Staatsoper.

During the 2025/26 season, Christoph Koncz will appear for the first time with the Cleveland Orchestra at their famed Severance Music Center. He will among others return to the Philharmonia Orchestra London, Swedish Radio Symphony Orchestra and Deutsches Symphonie-Orchester Berlin. He will conduct a new production of Hänsel und Gretel at the Opéra national du Rhin Strasbourg and a performance series of Don Giovanni at the Wiener Staatsoper.

== Discography ==
- 2020: Mozart's Violin – The Complete Violin Concertos, Les Musiciens du Louvre, Sony Classical
