= New Jersey Symphony =

American symphony orchestra

- Orchestra
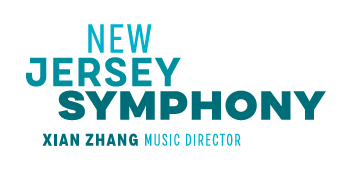
- Founded: 1922
- Concert hall: NJPAC (Newark); State Theatre (New Brunswick); Count Basie Center for the Arts (Red Bank); Mayo Performing Arts Center (Morristown); Richardson Auditorium (Princeton); Bergen Performing Arts Center (Englewood)
- Music director: Xian Zhang
- Website: www.njsymphony.org

The New Jersey Symphony, formerly the New Jersey Symphony Orchestra (NJSO), is an American symphony orchestra based in the state of New Jersey. The New Jersey Symphony is the state orchestra of New Jersey, performing classical subscription concert series and specials in six venues across the state, including the New Jersey Performing Arts Center in Newark, New Jersey, where it is the resident orchestra.

== Location and venues ==
The New Jersey Symphony presents classical, specials, pops and family concerts at venues in six cities and venues around the state:

- Newark: New Jersey Performing Arts Center (NJPAC)
- Red Bank: Count Basie Center for the Arts
- Morristown: Mayo Performing Arts Center
- New Brunswick: State Theatre
- Princeton: Richardson Auditorium at Princeton University
- Englewood: Bergen Performing Arts Center

The New Jersey Symphony previously presented concert series at the War Memorial in Trenton and the Paper Mill Playhouse in Millburn.

The New Jersey Symphony performs, or has performed, summer concerts at multiple venues across New Jersey, such as:

- Overpeck County Park (Bergen County)
- Echo Lake Park (Union County)
- Garden State Arts Center (Holmdel)
- Giralda Farms (Madison)
- Branch Brook Park (Newark)
- Meadowland Park (South Orange)
- Pier A Park (Hoboken)
- Mercer County Park (Mercer County)

The symphony also performs an annual Advent season concert of Handel's Messiah in Princeton and at the Cathedral Basilica of the Sacred Heart in Newark.

== History ==
Philip James founded the orchestra, under the name of the Montclair Art Association Orchestra, in 1922. The orchestra gave its first concert on 27 November 1922. During the 1940s, the orchestra performed at Newark Symphony Hall.

Following the 1968 departure of Kenneth Schermerhorn as its music director, the orchestra subsequently appointed Henry Lewis as its next music director, the first African-American music director of a major orchestra in the United States. Hugh Wolff was music director from 1985 to 1993.

=== "Golden Age" string collection ===
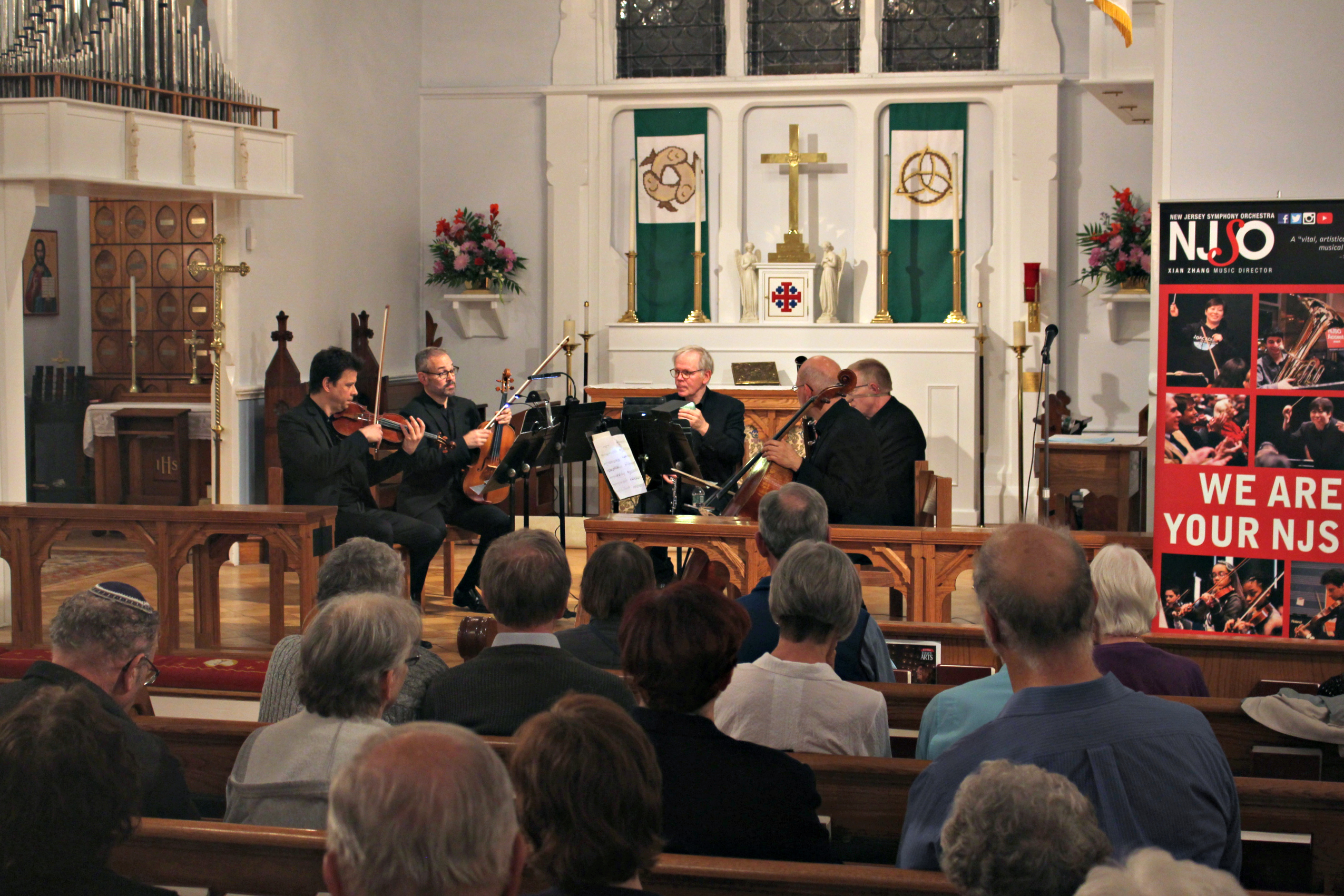
Players from the NJSO performing chamber music in Cape May, 2018

The New Jersey Symphony purchased 30 string instruments (including several made by Stradivari), for its string players, from the collection of Herbert R. Axelrod in 2003. The orchestra named this collection the "Golden Age" string collection, and hoped this acquisition would enhance the prestige of the orchestra and attract increased audiences and donations. Doubts later surfaced as to the actual value of the collection. Axelrod had claimed their value at $49 million, and sold it to the New Jersey Symphony for $17 million. However, it turned out that the $17 million value was closer to the current market value. News reporter investigations also raised doubts as to the authenticity of several of the instruments in the collection. Axelrod pled guilty for an unrelated criminal charge of federal tax fraud on this transaction.

The New Jersey Symphony had planned to retain the violins and not sell them, as of July 2006. However, in March 2007, the New Jersey Symphony stated that they would try to sell the Golden Age instrument collection to help alleviate their severe budgetary fiscal and deficit issues. The original agreement with Axelrod was that the orchestra would retain the instruments for at least 10 years, but Axelrod gave his assent to their sale. The intentions were to use the funds from the sale of the instruments to retire orchestra debt and to build up the orchestra's endowment fund. The orchestra had stated that their ideal scenario would be that the collection would be bought as a whole and then lent back to the orchestra, but commentators noted the difficulty of realizing such a plan.

In November 2007, the New Jersey Symphony announced that they had sold the Golden Age instruments to the American investment bankers (and twin brothers) Seth Taube and Brook Taube, along with a group of other investors, for $20 million and a portion of the proceeds from any future sales of the instruments. Part of the agreement allowed the orchestra to retain playing rights to 28 of those instruments for a minimum of 5 years.

=== Subsequent and recent history ===
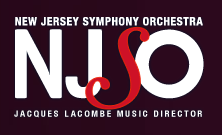
NJSO logo before the rebranding

Other press comments have noted that in spite of the financial troubles and controversy over this instrument collection, the orchestra has improved artistically during the tenure of Neeme Järvi (2005–2009). In October 2007, the New Jersey Symphony announced that Järvi had extended his contract as music director through the 2008–2009 season, with a commitment to six weeks of subscription concerts. In February 2008, the orchestra confirmed the conclusion of Järvi's tenure as the New Jersey Symphony's music director at the end of the 2008–2009 season. In March 2009, the New Jersey Symphony indicated that Järvi had agreed to serve as the orchestra's artistic adviser after the conclusion of his contract as music director, and subsequently to take the title of conductor laureate. The orchestra also reduced its staff and the number of subscription concerts, from 70 to 61, scheduled for the 2009–2010 season.

The New Jersey Symphony has had a series of radio broadcasts in the US since the 2006–2007 season. Gremillet announced in October 2007 that the radio broadcasts would continue. In addition, he stated the New Jersey Symphony's accumulated debt is at $15 million as of October 2007. After the announcement of the November 2007 sale of the Golden Age instruments, Gremillet stated that their scheduled sale cost will allow the orchestra to retire its accumulated debt of $14.2 million, and restore $3.1 million used from the New Jersey Symphony endowment used for the purchase of the instruments.

In November 2008, Jacques Lacombe guest-conducted the New Jersey Symphony for the first time. In October 2009, the New Jersey Symphony announced the appointment of Lacombe as its 13th music director, effective with the 2010–2011 season, with an initial contract of 3 years. Lacombe held the title of music director designate for the 2009–2010 season. In July 2012, the New Jersey Symphony announced the extension of Lacombe's contract as music director through the 2015–2016 season. In October 2014, the New Jersey Symphony announced the scheduled conclusion of Lacombe's tenure as the orchestra's music director after the conclusion of the 2015–2016 season.

Following the departure of Gremillet as New Jersey Symphony president, the orchestra appointed Richard Dare as its next December 2012. Dare took up the post at the beginning of January 2013. On January 10, 2013, Dare resigned as NJSO president, following reports of a prior accusation of a sexual offense in 1996, and possible exaggerations of his business accomplishments. Controversy subsequently ensued on the question of how much information New Jersey Symphony officials and board of trustees, and the search committee, knew of this situation during the source of the search for a new executive director. In June 2013, the New Jersey Symphony announced the appointments of James Roe as its next president and chief executive officer (CEO) and of Susan Stucker as its chief operating officer (COO), effective July 1, 2013. In June 2016, the New Jersey Symphony announced Gabriel van Aalst as its new CEO, beginning in October 2016.

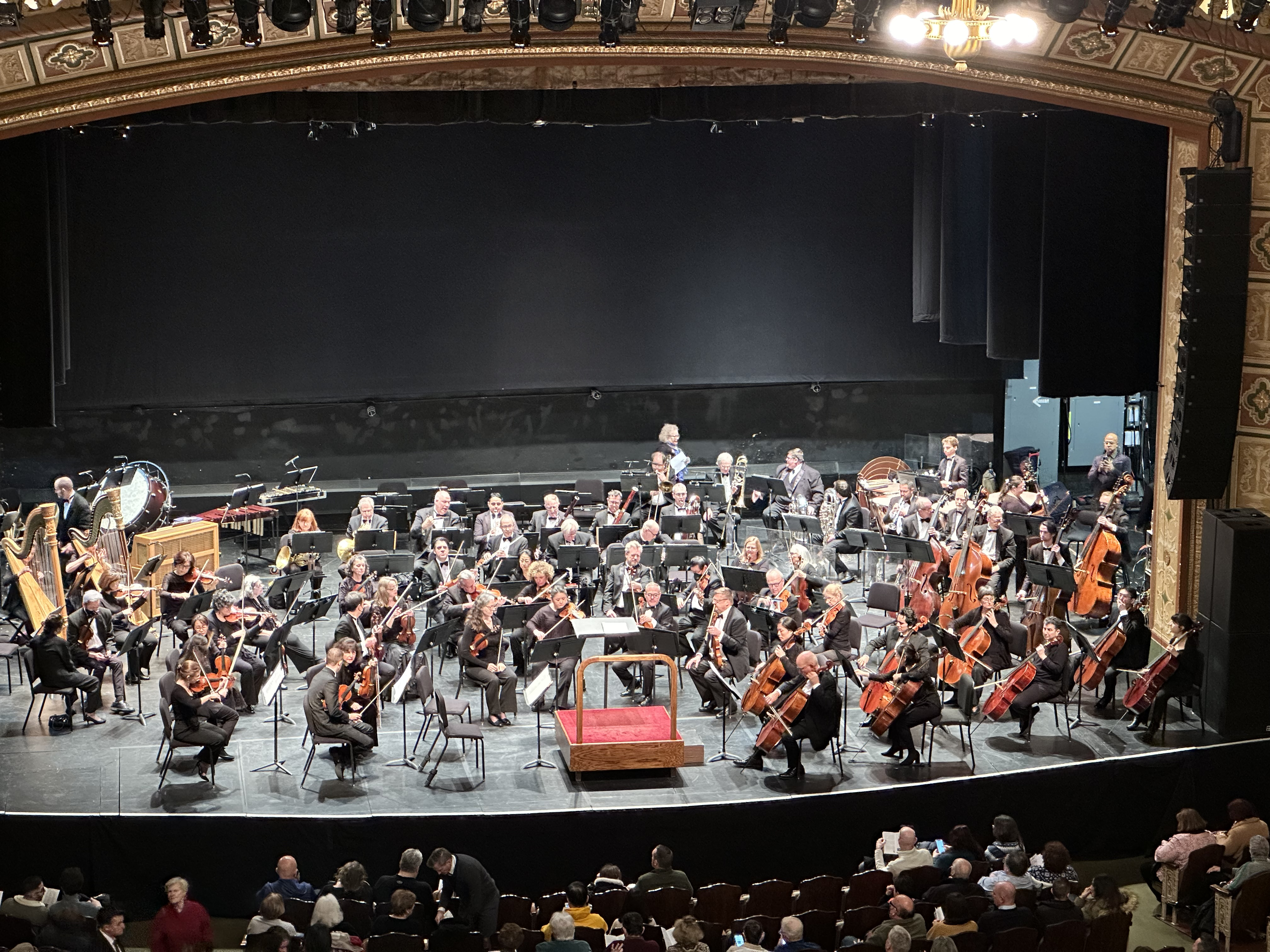
The New Jersey Symphony warming up before performance at Count Basie Center for the Arts in Red Bank, 2024

Xian Zhang first guest-conducted the New Jersey Symphony in 2010. She returned for further guest appearances in February 2012 and May 2015. In November 2015, the New Jersey Symphony announced her appointment as its 14th music director, effective in September 2016, with an initial contract of 4 years. She is the first female conductor to be named music director of the New Jersey Symphony. In March 2022, the New Jersey Symphony announced the second extension of Zhang's contract, through the 2027–2028 season. Zhang is scheduled to conclude her NJSO tenure at the close of the 2027–2028 season.

In 2020, in the wake of the COVID-19 pandemic, the orchestra launched 'New Jersey Symphony Virtual', featuring concert films, musicians performing in chamber ensembles, and virtual education programs. In December 2021, the organization changed its name from "New Jersey Symphony Orchestra" to "New Jersey Symphony" as part of a rebranding effort. The new brand consolidated the previously marketed name and "NJSO" acronym into a new singular marketing wordmark and name of "New Jersey Symphony."

In June 2024, the orchestra announced that van Aalst is to stand down as its president and CEO as of September 2024. In August 2024, the orchestra announced plans for construction of a permanent principal venue in Jersey City, named 'Symphony Center', scheduled for completion in 2026. In October 2024, the orchestra announced the appointment of Joshua Bell as its new principal guest conductor, effective with the 2025–2026 season, with an initial contract of four seasons. In December 2024, the orchestra announced the appointment of Terry D. Loftis as its next president and chief executive officer, effective in March 2025.

The New Jersey Symphony has made several records for the Delos label with former music director Zdeněk Mácal, including works of Hector Berlioz, Antonín Dvořák, Reinhold Glière and Modest Mussorgsky. With Lacombe, the New Jersey Symphony made a commercial recording of Carmina Burana, taken from Lacombe's debut appearances with the orchestra.

== Music Directors ==
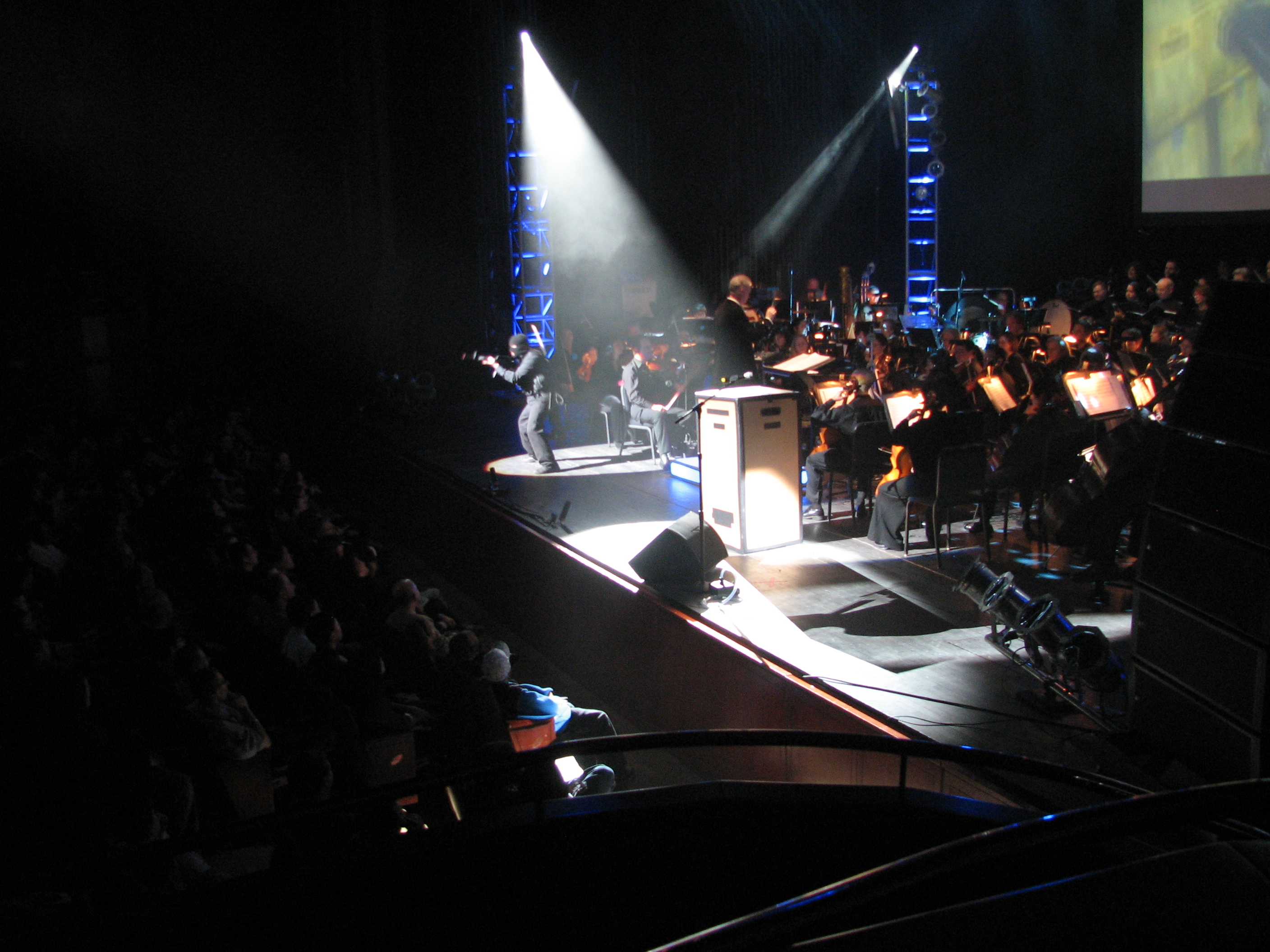
NJSO performing at NJPAC in 2008

- Philip James (1922–1929)
- Rene Pollain (1929–1939)
- Frieder Weissmann (1940–1947)
- Samuel Antek (1947–1958)
- Matyas Abas (1958–1960)
- Kenneth Schermerhorn (1962–1968)
- Henry Lewis (1968–1976)
- Thomas Michalak (1977–1983)
- Hugh Wolff (1985–1993)
- Zdeněk Mácal (1993–2002)
- Neeme Järvi (2005–2009)
- Jacques Lacombe (2010–2016)
- Xian Zhang (2016–present)
