= Orpheum Theatre (Sioux City, Iowa) =

Historic theater in Iowa, United States

- New Orpheum Theatre
- U.S. National Register of Historic Places
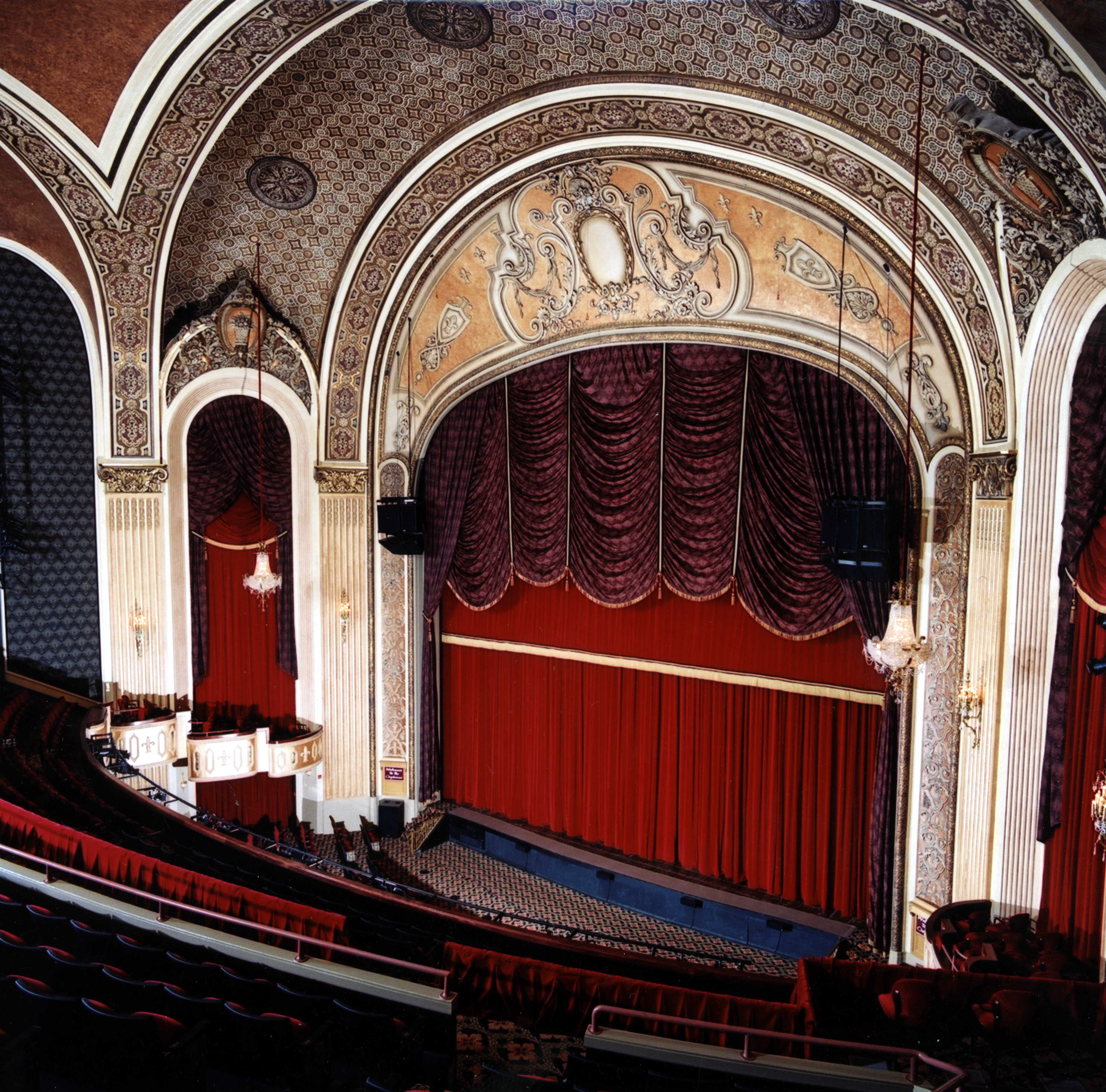
- The main stage and curtain at the Sioux City Orpheum

- Location within Iowa Location within the United States
- Location: 528 Pierce St. Sioux City, Iowa
- Coordinates: 42°29′44.15″N 96°24′17.34″W
- Built: 1927
- Architect: Rapp & Rapp
- Architectural style: Late 19th And 20th Century Revivals, French Renaissance
- NRHP reference No.: 00000919
- Added to NRHP: August 25, 2000

The Orpheum Theatre, also known as New Orpheum Theatre and Orpheum Electric Building, is a performing arts center located at 528 S. Pierce Street in Sioux City, Iowa. Built in 1927 as a vaudeville and movie palace, the theatre was restored in 1999 and today is the home of the Sioux City Symphony Orchestra.

== Early history ==
The Sioux City Orpheum was designed by the nationally known Chicago firm of Rapp & Rapp and constructed in 1927 as part of the Orpheum Circuit. The major builder for the theatre was local Sioux City businessman, Arthur Sanford. It was one of the largest theatres in Iowa at its time and was certainly somewhat of a risk financially for Mr. Sanford, with a total construction cost of 1.75 million. This once opulent vaudeville and moving picture house boasted a large 2,650 seat, three story auditorium complete with Wurlitzer pipe organ, half circle boxes, hand carved detailing, gilded ornamentation, several crystal chandeliers and a hand painted ceiling. Throughout the years, the Orpheum was used for symphony performances, ballet and special attractions and hosted entertainers such as Fred Astaire, Tallulah Bankhead, and Katharine Hepburn.

== Restoration ==
According to Ray Shepardson, a nationally known theatre restoration specialist, because of the work of filmmaker George Lindblade, the project may be the most extensively documented major theatre restoration in the United States. Lindblade's documentary "Puttin' on the Glitz" is the latest in a long list of award-winning projects.

Over the decades, the theater suffered numerous insensitive remodels but has recently been restored. In 1982, the theater was "twinned" or cut into two small movie houses, and a wall of sheet rock was placed down the center aisle. These movie theaters operated until 1992 when for the first time in 65 years, the Orpheum went dark.

The reconstruction, overseen by Ray Shepardson, was started in 1999 with the expertise of architect Ed Storm, AIA from FEH DESIGN in Sioux City at a cost of nearly $12 million. During the renovation 3 of the original crystal chandeliers were found intact above the drop-ceiling. Their single toughest problem was reconstructing the balcony and loge boxes. It took four months and 40,000 pounds of steel to complete the reconstruction. When the theater reopened in the fall of 2001, reporter Robert Morast wrote in the Sioux Falls Argus Leader: "Basically, the Orpheum feels like an upper-class theater ripped out of an old black-and-white movie and given a Technicolor treatment. The ambiance alone is worth the price of admission."

The Orpheum Theater was publicly reopened on 15 September 2001. Recent performances have been given by Bill Cosby, Sheryl Crow, B.B. King, Bob Dylan, Olivia Newton-John, Wynton Marsalis and David Copperfield. The building was listed on the National Register of Historic Places in 2000.

== See also ==
Movie palaces list
