= Cyril Diederich =

French conductor

Cyril Diederich (born 2 October 1945) is a French conductor.

== Career ==
Born in Aix-en-Provence, after studying piano, horn and timpani, Diederich studied writing at the conservatories of Toulouse and Rennes, and studied conducting with Louis Fourestier and Jean-Sébastien Béreau.

A prize-winner at the Conservatoire de Paris, he won two international conducting prizes, in Italy and Poland.

In 1975, he began his professional career as an assistant conductor to Serge Baudo at the Opéra national de Lyon, then in 1978 as assistant conductor to Jean-Claude Casadesus at the Orchestre national de Lille. At the same time, thanks to the producer and artistic director Michel Glotz, he stayed in Berlin to attend the work of Herbert von Karajan, and later became the disciple of Georges Prêtre.

In 1984, he was appointed music and artistic director of the Orchestre national de Montpellier Languedoc-Roussillon.

In 1986, he received the prize for Musical Revelation of the Year, awarded by French music critics, and in 1988 he premiered Noces de sang, an opera by Charles Chaynes after Federico García Lorca's Blood Wedding.

In 1998, he became the musical and artistic director of the Orchestre symphonique de Mulhouse and became principal guest conductor at the Opéra national du Rhin in Strasbourg.

He became permanent conductor and musical advisor at the Opéra de Marseille in 2007.

In 2012, he took over the musical direction of the Orchestre symphonique de Paris and founded the "Grands Concerts d'oratorios" in Paris.

In 2017, he participated in the creation of the Festival à vocation lyrique Les Concerts au Coucher de Soleil in Oppède (Luberon).

== Sources ==
- Alain Pâris (2004). Dictionnaire des interprètes et de l'interprétation musicale. Bouquins (in French). Paris: Laffont. p. 232. ISBN 2221080645. OCLC 901287624. Pâris2004.
