= Toma T. Socolescu =

Romanian architect

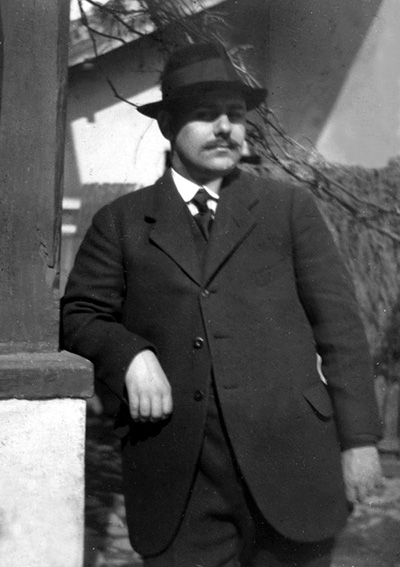
- Toma T. Socolescu in his youth.
- Born: 20 July 1883; Ploiești, Kingdom of Romania
- Died: 14 October 1960 (aged 77); Bucharest, Socialist Republic of Romania
- Resting place: Bellu Cemetery, Bucharest
- Citizenship: (Romania) romanian
- Education: Ion Mincu University
- Occupation: Architect
- Years active: 1905-1955
- Spouse: Florica Tănescu
- Children: Toma Barbu Socolescu, Mircea Socolescu.
- Parent(s): Toma N. Socolescu, Alexandrina Nicolau
- Relatives: Ion N. Socolescu
- Awards: First prize in the contest for the Palace of the Municipality of Bucharest (1925), Honorary citizen of the city of Ploiești, Member of the Order of the Crown of Romania to the rank of officer
- Practice: Architecture, urban planning, archeology, university education, culture, painting, politics, writing
- Buildings: Central Market Hall, Palace of Justice, Palace of Business Schools and St John cathedral of Ploiești,
- Projects: City planning of Ploiești, city radius increase
- Design: Brâncovenesc style, Neo-Romanian architecture

Toma T. Socolescu was a major Romanian architect, born in Ploiești on 20 July 1883, and died in Bucharest on 14 October 1960. A pillar of Romanian architecture from the early 20th century until World War II, he dedicated his entire life to his native region of Prahova, particularly to the city of Ploiești. He also made significant contributions to the cultural life of his country.

== Biography ==
Toma T. Socolescu left a lasting mark on modern Romanian architecture up until the Second World War, both through a significant legacy of remarkable buildings and through his involvement in cultural institutions and architectural literature reflecting the evolution of Romanian architecture. He remains a reference figure in the worlds of architecture and art. More than a dozen of his works have been listed as historical monuments.

=== Education and travels ===
The son, grandson, and nephew of architects, his career choice was nevertheless not an easy one. After a happy and fulfilling childhood, his father died suddenly on 22 November 1897, followed by his mother three years later, on the same date. (Note: page 23.) Orphaned at the age of 17, he was left responsible for his four younger siblings. Toma T. had a natural talent for drawing (Note: page 104.) and devoted his free time to sketching during his last three years of high school. (Note: In 1931, during the inauguration of the Ploiești Fine Arts Museum, Socolescu wrote in his speech: [...] I deeply felt these shortcomings, and as far as I’m concerned, I came to realize them over time, thanks to the fact that, living in my father's house, who was also an architect, I decided at an early age to pursue an artistic career. I can therefore say that I cultivated drawing almost instinctively, especially during my last years of high school.: La inaugurarea Muzeului de arte frumoase al Municipiului Ploieşti - pages 86-87.) Eager for knowledge, he took full advantage of his father's extensive library and inherited his talent for drawing. Despite the family’s catastrophic financial situation, the dispersion of his siblings, who were taken in by uncles and cousins of the Socolescu family, (Note: pages 21, 23, and 24. His father, Toma N. Socolescu, was involved in numerous projects and heavily indebted.) and the unfavorable economic conditions for architects at the end of the 19th century in Romania, he benefited from free higher education at that time. (Note: page 24.) His uncle, architect Ioan N. Socolescu, would not encourage him to pursue a career in architecture. Toma T. therefore initially enrolled in law studies, which he quickly abandoned to forge his own path and follow his passion for art and architecture.

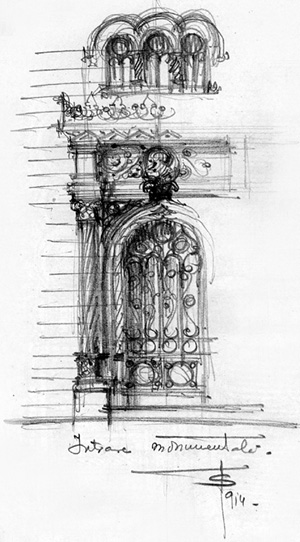
Sketch of a monumental entry. Extract from Toma T. Socolescu's sketches notebook.

He completed his secondary studies in 1901 at the Saint-Pierre-et-Saint-Paul High School in Ploiești before enrolling at the Ion Mincu University of Architecture and Urbanism, then called the National School of Architecture, where he studied under Ion Mincu, the leading figure in early 20th-century Romanian architecture.

During his student years, Toma T. was involved in a variety of activities alongside his academic studies:

The first years of school were divided between architecture studies, music sessions at the Schifleers' house until his departure for Paris, as well as various concerts, readings at the Carol I Foundation and the school library, attending lectures at the University, logic and contemporary philosophy history with T. Maiorescu, psychology and aesthetics with Constantin Rădulescu-Motru, a free course on the history of world literature with N. Lorga, history of painting and sculpture with projections by Tzigara-Samurcaș at the Carol I Foundation, as well as numerous conferences at the Athenaeum, painting and sculpture exhibitions, and more rarely, architecture exhibitions through public competitions that were displayed at the Athenaeum. Additionally, I also participated, albeit more rarely, in some political meetings, particularly those of the junimists conservatives, who, except for Take Ionescu, a cantacuzinist conservative, were the most prominent and talented speakers in the country. (Note: page 26.)

The goal of the architecture school was then:

orienta şi forma la studenţi, dragostea pentru valorile culturale ale trecutului ţării, de a le insufla interesul pentru reluarea tradiţiei arhitecturii româneşti, în noile condiţii impuse de necesităţile şi aspiraţiile societăţii moderne

Translation:

to guide and train students in the love for the cultural values of the country's past, to instill in them an interest in the revival of Romanian architectural tradition within the new conditions imposed by the needs and aspirations of modern society

Starting in 1903, students were required to conduct architectural surveys of historical monuments in order to study and highlight national art. These exercises played an important role in the use of a wide range of forms and decorative elements in the creations of architects. (Note: Nicolae Lascu, cited by the author, Școala de Arhitectură și « Stilul Românesc » 1900-1915, in the journal Arhitectura, 1985/5, year 33, pages 37-44 - page 100.)

He graduated (no. 42), specializing in civil architecture, religious architecture, and Romanian archaeology, with the highest honors in June 1911. He gained his first professional experiences during his studies. A draftsman at the Central Post Office in Bucharest around 1905, (Note: page 42.) (Note: page 101.) he was then co-opted, still as a draftsman, in 1906 by a leading group of architects led by Ștefan Burcuș, Victor Ștefănescu, and Ion D. Berindey, who organized the General Romanian Exhibition in Bucharest in 1906. (Note: pages 34-39. A park named Carol Park was specially designed for the event by French landscape architect fr:Édouard Redont. The exhibition lasted from 6 June to 23 November 1906.) The event was organized by the Romanian conservative government to celebrate the 40th anniversary of King Carol I's reign. This opportunity allowed him to connect with some of the most prominent artists and architects of the time. These encounters had a decisive impact on the course of his career.

His travels to Vienna, Constantinople, and Budapest in 1913, and especially to Italy from 15 December 1923, to 20 February 1924 (Note: pages 107, 110, and 127.)., and later in January 1937, (Note: note 6, page 128; pages 158-159 and 169.) as well as to France, represented significant milestones in his life. He found sources of inspiration for his work in Romania during these trips.

==== World War I ====
He actively participated in the First World War. Enlisted in the 47th Infantry Regiment in 1916, he was quickly transferred to the Bucharest Railway Regiment and later detached to the Danube Defense Group or (Grupul Apărării Dunarii). (Note: page 57.) There, he was tasked, along with other architects and engineers, with destroying bridges during the retreat from Moldavia. (Note: pages 59-60.) He also built hospital centers and sanitary facilities, as typhus had ravaged the Romanian army. (Note: pages 61-63 - Due to the overcrowding we were living in in Moldavia, the lack of hygiene, and the rush of the Russians who came to help us but as "protectors," as one of their generals once said, and not as allies as we had believed, an epidemic of exanthematous typhus broke out and spread, brought by the Russians. Soldiers, civilians, and doctors were dying in droves. In the 1st division, where I was assigned, no fewer than 6,000 soldiers died, and there was no longer any care for their burial. We were living in the age of the apocalypse, and what I saw reminded me of scenes from Dante's hell, illustrated by Gustave Doré. (English translation)) Around 1917, he joined a battalion of mountain troops. (Note: page 63.) The retreat of the Romanian army to Moldavia allowed him to discover the rural and sacred art of various Romanian regions. (Note: pages 57-63, and page 74: In the suburbs of Chișinău, I found many Romanian houses retaining the old forms and decoration known throughout our country, made of wood and plaster. I took sketches and painted in watercolor three of the most characteristic and original houses. They were reproduced in a propaganda book at the end of the peace, when our historical and ethnic rights over this ancient Romanian province were recognized. It was recently published in color in the Polytechnic Review of Bucharest and was also to appear in a book prepared by Professor N. Iorga on Bessarabia, from the Romanian Academy. (English translation)) (Note: page 178.) Never separating from his notebook of notes and sketches, he made numerous drawings of folk art and traditional architectural styles, (Note: page 60.) (Note: page 99.) which he would later draw inspiration from. Two reproductions of his watercolors depicting houses in Chișinău (Bessarabia) were published in 1926. (Note: Toma T. Socolescu, Case vechi românești din Chișinău, watercolor reproductions, 1926, Volume V, page 98.) In 1941, he wrote an article dedicated to ancient Romanian art in Bessarabia, illustrated by his own watercolors. (Note: Toma T. Socolescu, Vechea artă românească în Basarabia, article and illustrations, January–March 1941, Year VII, No. 1, pages 122-124.) (Note: page 191.)

=== Professorship and writing ===
The works of Toma T. Socolescu, and the monograph of Ploiești (shown in the upper right).

Toma T. Socolescu, in addition to his private professional activity, was a professor at the Ion Mincu University, a position he held from 1927 to 1947. (Note: pages 100 and 103.) He was one of the rare architects of his time to be so prolific in specialized literature, and not only in the strict fields of architecture or urbanism. (Note: pages 104–108.) He had a strong interest in architectural theory and criticism (Note: pages 100, 103–104, 107 and 199.) and published a two-volume course on architectural theory at the Ion Mincu Faculty. (Note: pages 100, 103 and 198) Between 1922 and 1948, Toma T. Socolescu taught this very subject. He published several books and numerous articles in journals such as Arhitectura, Simetria, Buletinul Comisiei Monumentelor Istorice, and Căminul, as well as in various local newspapers. In the monograph of the city of Ploiești published in 1937 by Mihail Sevastos, he authored the chapters on architecture, the Central Market Hall, urban planning, the history of city maps, and also the section on culture. In 1938, a year later, he published Arhitectura în Ploești, studiu istoric, a historical study on the architecture of Ploiești, prefaced by Nicolae Iorga. The book included the chapters written (by the architect) for the Monograph of the City of Ploești. On 20 March 1958, (Note: As evidenced by the architect's signature date following his instructions regarding a possible third-party publication – page 217.) he submitted to the library of the Ion Mincu Institute of Architecture a monograph dedicated to Ion Mincu: Ion Mincu, profesor arhitect 1851–1912, written in two volumes: a 408-page documentary volume and a photo album containing 132 images. (Note: page 107.)

Two of his works were published posthumously in 2004: Fresca Arhitecţilor care au lucrat în România în epoca modernă 1800–1925, regarded as the reference bibliography for architecture of that period, (Note: pages 11, 14, 107, and 199.) and the first part of his memoirs Amintiri, covering the period from his birth until 1924. (Note: page 105.) He was working on the second part of his memoirs when he died.

=== Public life and official functions ===
He served as Chief Architect of Prahova County from 1919 to 1920 (Note: page 84.) (Note: page 794.) and then as Mayor of the city of Ploiești from December 1919 to March 1920. (Note: pages 422, 435, and 442–443. Toma T. Socolescu served as Mayor from January to the end of March 1920, and as President of the Interim Commission from December 1919 to the end of March 1920, during the administration of Prime Minister Alexandru Vaida-Voevod from 1 December 1919 to 12 March 1920.) He was awarded The Order of the "Queen Maria Cross" for his sanitary military constructions during the First World War, (Note: page 119.) and was made Officer of the Order of the Crown of Romania by royal decree of King Ferdinand I of Romania in 1925. In May 1927, he was also awarded the First-Class "Reward for Work in Education" medal for his contributions to education, on the occasion of the inauguration of the main wing of the Palace of the Commercial Schools of Ploiești. He was a member of the Romanian Society of Architects from 1911 until its dissolution by the communist regime in 1948. Within the society, he held various positions: auditor from 1925 to 1927, (Note: 1926, Year V, pages 1-2; January–March 1941, Year VII, page 96.) and then vice president in 1944. (Note: 1943–44, Years XIX–X, page 75.) In November 1953, he joined the organization that succeeded the SAR: the Union of Architects of the People's Republic of Romania. (Note: page 14.)

He founded and presided over the Nicolae Iorga Cultural Establishment (Așezământul Cultural Nicolae Iorga) during the 1920s and 1930s. (Note: page 85.) (Note: pages 30 and 103.) He also served as a Municipal Councillor of Ploiești from 10 March 1926 to 20 March 1929, under Mayor Ion Georgescu Obrocea. (Note: page 444.) In the early 1940s, he was part of the editorial selection committee of the Romanian architectural journal Arhitectura. His approach sought to bring together all people of good will who wished to make knowledge accessible to the greatest number and to beautify the city. In line with this vision, he became a member of the Rotary Club of Ploiești in April 1937. (Note: pages 103–104.)

Primarily a man of the arts and culture, Toma T. Socolescu maintained a consistent but limited political engagement. His roles as mayor, municipal councillor, and deputy were above all means to advance cultural, urban planning, and architectural projects. A committed student and patriot, his strong ties with Nicolae Iorga led him to take on responsibilities within Iorga’s political party, the Partidul Naționalist-Democrat. Open-minded and independent in spirit, he also formed numerous connections and friendships with figures from other political backgrounds, notably with Ion Ionescu-Quintus of the National Liberal Party, with whom he was closely associated. (Note: pages 66–69.) (Note: pages 361–363.) He was appointed to the Executive Central Committee of the Nationalist Democratic Party in 1926, (Note: page 172.) and later became Vice President of the party in May 1929, a position confirmed during the party’s meeting of 7 April 1931. (Note: page 181.) He served as Deputy for Prahova County under the same party during the Iorga cabinet, from 19 April 1931 to 6 June 1932. (Note: page 435.) His only known political action at the national level was his support for the 1932 draft bill for the Organization of the Romanian Order of Architects and the Architects’ Register. (Note: Statie Ciortan, Constituirea corpului arhitecţilor din România, 1931–1933, pages 3–8.) (Note: I. D. Enescu, După O jumătate de veac, Jan.–Mar. 1941, Year VII, page 12.) (Note: page 45.) The law was adopted by Parliament and enacted through a royal decree on 15 July 1932.

He also served as Mayor of his adopted commune, Păulești, from February 1938 to November 1940, and again from February 1942 to January 1945, two highly active mandates that allowed for the modernization of the commune.

In recognition of his contributions, he was posthumously granted the title of "Honorary Citizen of the city of Ploiești" in September 2010, and was also named Honorary Citizen of the commune of Păulești posthumously in May 2018.

=== Life in Păulești ===
Toma T. Socolescu acquired a manor house along with a large adjoining plot of 5 hectares in 1927, in the village of Păulești, located a few kilometers from Ploiești. His family settled there the same year. He regularly hosted prominent figures from Ploiești at the estate.

Most of the land was devoted to farming activities. (Note: page 100.) Deeply committed to his role as Mayor (1938–1940 and 1942–1945), in addition to modernizing the commune and building numerous public facilities, he supported villagers in need. He also organized and financed free agricultural training in viticulture and fruit cultivation for all residents of the commune, which he held on his own farm, located on the grounds of the Socolescu manor. (Note: pages 196–204.) Thanks to his zootechnical knowledge and his decision to import bulls from Switzerland to develop a more productive breed, he enabled Păulești's dairy production to double. (Note: pages 198–199.)

=== Communist period ===
Intellectual and a member of a respectable family from Romania, Toma T. Socolescu was a significant political figure in the Prahova County. He refused to join the new communist organization of architects established in 1947, which became, in December 1952, the "Union of Architects of the RPR", replacing the Société des Architectes Roumains (SAR). The departure of his eldest son, Mircea, for France around 1944-1945 worsened the family's situation in the eyes of the communist authorities. Considered a "class enemy" he was threatened, blackmailed, and persecuted by the communist authorities, particularly by the Securitate (the Romanian political police). (Note: page 192.) He avoided imprisonment, but his movable and immovable property was confiscated (nationalized) or stolen in the 1950s by the local communist authorities. (Note: In 1950, his property in Ploiești was nationalized by the Romanian state - pag 100. In 1952, his house and lands in Păulești were seized by the local authorities following financial difficulties, which were the direct consequences of, on one hand, the confiscation of his property in Ploiești, already damaged by the American bombings of 1944, and on the other hand, his dismissal from his position as a professor at the University and the ban on practicing as a freelance professional - page 100.) Families from the respectable Romanian society particularly suffered from the policy of persecution, restriction, isolation, and even imprisonment, imposed by the communists against people considered suspicious or hostile to the regime. Forced into retirement from his position as a professor at the Ion Mincu University in 1947, banned from practicing architecture, he was later expropriated and expelled from his estate in Păulești on 21 February 1952 (Note: pages 178-179.) and moved in with his son Toma Barbu Socolescu in Bucharest. (Note: pages 390-395.)

The Socolescu family was harassed and mistreated by the Securitate until its disappearance in 1960. Benefiting from a modest pension with no other income, but still seeking an occupation, he was forced to accept a position at state institutes. He worked until the age of 74, first at the Institute of Urban Planning and Constructions (ISPROR), (Note: pages 400-401.) then, from 1953, within the framework of the Central Institute for the Systematization of Cities and Regions (ICSOR), where he was seconded to the Department of Historical Monuments for four years. (Note: note at the bottom of page 43.) On 12 February 1957, he was forcibly retired with a reduced pension. Despite adversity and difficulties, Toma T. Socolescu tirelessly fought until his last days to defend his vision of architecture., primarily through the three monographs on the subject that he wrote and revised from 1949 to 1959. (Note: pages 13, 106-107.)

=== Architectural contests ===
Practicing architecture as a freelance profession, he won numerous awards in public competitions:

1. First prize for both subjects: standard plans for a small wooden church with a single bell tower and a larger one with multiple bell towers, Pantocratorul, 1907. (Note: pages 177 and 203.)
2. Second prize for the project of the Normal School of Buzău, in 1911. The first prize was not awarded as only two architects participated in the competition. (Note: pages 45-46.) (Note: pages 186 and 203.)
3. First prize in the competition for the unification of the facades of the Adevărul and Dimineața newspapers' buildings, in which more than 30 architects participated in 1914. Toma T.’s project was published in the Dimineața newspaper as well as in the Arhitectura magazine in 1916 and 1924. (Note: Toma T. Socolescu, Palatul Ziarului Adevărul, drawing, 1916, year I, No. 2, May, page 67.; Toma T. Socolescu, Palatul Adevărului, drawing, 1924, year III, page 147.)
4. First prize in the competition for the Palace of the Chamber of Commerce and Industry of Ploiești, in 1920, following the acquisition of neighboring buildings by the Chamber of Commerce. The project was only partially executed between 1930 and 1935. (Note: pages 186, 193, and 205.) The Chamber was abolished by the communist regime in 1949, after 84 years of existence. The palace was heavily affected by the 1940 earthquake, and later destroyed during the communist period. However, a dependency of the Chamber, the Scala cinema, built by Toma T. in the 1930s, was spared and is still visible.
5. First prize in the competition for the Creditul Prahovei (or initially Banca Românească) building in Ploiești, in 1923. (Note: pages 186 and 204.) The project and photographs of the bank were published in the Arhitectura magazine in 1926. (Note: Toma T. Socolescu, Banca Creditul Prahovei Ploiești, plans, drawings, and photographs, 1926, year V, pages 111-114.) The work was completed. (Note: pages 174, 175, 186, and 204.)
6. First prize in the competition for the Orthodox Cathedral of the city of Târgu Mureș in 1924. The cathedral was built, but according to the plans of another architect who had failed in the competition. (Note: pages 178, 186, and 204.)
7. First prize in the competition for the City Hall Palace of Bucharest in 1925, in collaboration with architect D. Petrescu-Gopeş. The project and photographs were published in the Arhitectura magazine in 1926. (Note: Toma T. Socolescu and D Pretescu-Gopeș, Concursul pentru Palatul Primăriei Orașului București, Plans and drawings - Class I, 1926, year V, pages 50-51.) This success was an occasion to celebrate the architect in Ploiești. No construction ultimately took place, as the City Hall settled in the Palace of the Ministry of Public Works, a building constructed in 1910 by architect Petre Antonescu.
8. First prize in the competition for the Casino of the Astra Română refinery in Ploiești, in 1937, with his son Barbu Socolescu. (Note: pages 186, 192-193, 205, and 206.) The project was published in the Arhitectura magazine in the July–October 1937 issue. (Note: Toma T. Socolescu, De la concursul "Astrei Române" pentru executarea cazinoului funcționarilor săi din Ploiești - Un concurs de schițe, Plans, drawings, and text, July–October 1937, No. 9-10, pages 19-20.) The project was never realized.
9. First prize in the competition for the city halls of Predeal. (Note: page 6.) (Note: page 205.) The work was not executed.
10. The architect also claimed to have won the first prize in the competition for the Palace of Labor in the city of Ploiești, a project which he stated would have been executed. However, no evidence of its realization has been found. (Note: In 2022, historian Lucian Vasile stated that it was supposed to be carried out by the Ministry of Labor in 1940, on Kogălniceanu Street, likely at the current location of Hotel Prahova. The war prevented its realization.)

He also won the first prize for his design of the Central Market at the official Architecture and Decorative Arts Exhibitions in Bucharest in 1930. (Note: pages 148-149.) (Note: page 316.) and 1933. (Note: page 7.) (Note: page 474.)

=== Genealogy ===
The Socol family of Berivoiul-Mare, formerly part of Făgăraș or Țara Făgărașului is a branch of the Socol family of Muntenia, which lived in the county of Dâmbovița. A 'Socol', great boyar and son-in-law of Mihai Viteazul (1557–1601), had two religious foundations in Dâmbovița county, still existing, Cornești and Răzvadu de Sus. He built their churches and another one in the suburb of Târgoviște. This boyar married Marula, daughter of Tudora din Popești, also known as Tudora din Târgșor, sister of Prince Antonie-Vodă. Marula was recognized by Mihai Viteazul as his illegitimate daughter, following an extra-marital liaison with Tudora. Marula is buried in the church of Răzvadu de Sus, where, on a richly carved stone slab, her name can be read.

Nicolae Iorga, the great Romanian historian and friend of Toma T. Socolescu, found Socol ancestors among the founders of the City of Făgăraș in the 12th century. (Note: Note 8 - page 15.) In 1655, the Prince of Transylvania George II Rákóczi ennobled an ancestor of Nicolae G. Socol: "Ștefan Boier din Berivoiul Mare, and through him his wife Sofia Spătar, his son Socoly, and their heirs and descendants of whatever sex, to be treated and regarded as true and undeniable NOBLEMEN.", (Note: pages 8 and 9 - Extract from the ennoblement deed of 14 July 1655.) in gratitude for his services as the Prince's courier in the Carpathians, a function "which he fulfilled faithfully and steadfastly for many years, and especially in these stormy times [...]". (Note: page 14 - Toma T. Socolescu writes: "My grandfather, Nicolae Gh. Socolescu, also an architect, having finished his studies in Vienna, was a descendant of a family that, through a distant ancestor, had obtained a noble rank, in 1655, from G. Rakoczy. The original document written in calfskin, in Latin, with gold letters and the family emblem in colors, laced and bearing the princely seal in red wax, is in the possession of Major S. Socol, former mayor of the city of Făgăraș, where he lives." (Translated from Romanian)) Around 1846, five Socol (Note: page 14 - Toma T. Socolescu writes: "N. G. Socolescu (Socol, in Ardeal) came to Muntenia from the Berivoiu Mare commune, located at the foot of the mountains in the Făgăraș region, and settled in Ploiesti, together with his five other brothers, - around the revolution, around 1846, - namely in Sf. Spiridon outskirts. During my childhood and until later, there was his house in Culea Căleni, a ground-floor house, square-shaped, set back from the street and surrounded by a garden. He married Ioana, born Săndulescu, from the same suburb, and his name appears among the founders in the parish registers; and as was customary at the time, I believe he was also buried there - although the searches I made were unsuccessful - in 1872." (Translated from Romanian)) come to Muntenia, from Berivoiu Mare, in the territory of Făgăraș.

"Five brothers crossed the mountains, all builders, from the Făgăraș region, a village at the foot of the mountains, Berivoiul-Mare, where the name of Socol is still widespread today, and where one of their ancestors is said to have come from Munténie, namely from the region of Târgoviște, which is the home of the Socol family, being to this day, near Târgovişte, Valea lui Socol (the Socol Valley), as well as their two founding churches, in Răzvadu de Sus and Cornești. (Note: Translation of an extract from page 37.) (Note: Translation of an extract from page 177.)"

One of the brothers was architect Nicolae Gh. Socol (??-1872). He settled in Ploiești around 1840-1845, and named himself Socolescu. He married Iona Săndulescu, from the Sfantu Spiridon suburb. He had a daughter (died in infancy) and four sons, (Note: pages 105-106.) (Note: pages 214-215.) two of whom became major architects: Toma N. Socolescu and Ion N. Socolescu. The lineage of architects continues with Toma T. Socolescu, and his son Toma Barbu Socolescu.

The historian, cartographer and geographer Dimitrie Papazoglu evokes, in 1891, (Note: page 17 - Dimitrie Papazoglu, Istoria fondărei orașului București, București, Curtea Veche, 2005, page 59.) the presence of Romanian boyars of the first rank Socoleşti, in Bucharest, descendants of Socol from Dâmbovița. Finally, Constantin Stan also refers, in 1928, to the precise origin of Nicolae Gheorghe Socol:

"At the foot of the Carpathians, on the right bank of the stream of the same name, lies the commune of Berivoiul-Mare [...], one of the oldest villages in the Olt household [...]. The inhabitants are composed of serfs and former boyars. [...], and the Romanian boyar families were: Socol, Boyer, Sinea and Răduleț, soldiers with border guard privileges.[...] The G. Streza Socol family gave birth to Nicolae Socol, a graduated architect from Vienna, who settled in the town of Ploeşti with several of his brothers around the middle of the last century. (Note: Translation from Romanian of extracts from passages quoted on page 17 - Constantin Stan, Şcoala poporană din Făgăraş şi depe Târnave, Volumul.I, Făgăraşul. Sibiu, Tiparul institutului de arte Grafice “Dacia Traiană”, 1928, page 150–152.)"

Family tree

Niculae Gheorghe Socol (~1820-1872) architect and builder in Ploiești	Ioana Săndulescu
Alexandrina Nicolau (1860–1900)	Toma N. Socolescu (1848–1897) architect and builder in Ploiești	Nicolae N. Socolescu timber merchant	Ghiță N. Socolescu artist painter, dead during his graduate studies	Ion N. Socolescu (1856–1924) architect
Florica Tănescu (1887-1969)	Toma T. Socolescu (1883–1960) professor-architect	Florica T. Socolescu	Smaranda T. Socolescu	Ioan T. Socolescu	Coralia-Ioana-Margareta T. Socolescu
Mircea Socolescu (1907–1978) settled in France in 1945, married without children	Toma Gheorghe Barbu Socolescu (1909–1977) professor-architect	Irena Gabriela Vasilescu (1910–1993) artist painter, teacher
Mihai Ștefan Marc Socolescu (1942–1994) teacher	Maria Lois (1942-2021) teacher
Laura Socolescu (1967) settled in France – artist-choreographer, dancer

== Architectural and urbanistic work ==
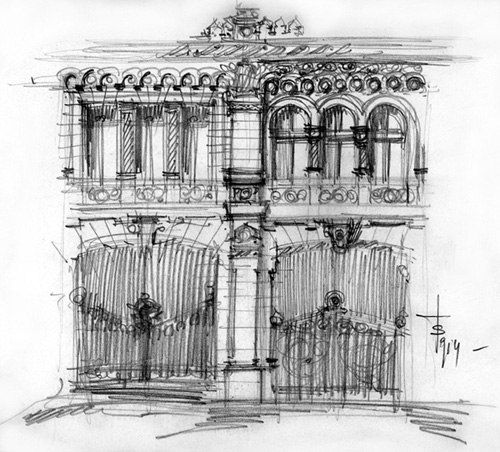
Facade sketch. Extract from the Toma T. Socolescu's sketch notebook.

The architect began his career as an independent architect in Ploiești, continuing the work of his father and grandfather. His early days were difficult, as he describes in his memoirs: "Working alone both at the drawing board and on-site, building directly with craftsmen from Ploiești and lacking extensive technical knowledge, compounded by my lack of experience — especially since I had only worked in one of the architectural firms in Bucharest that handled major projects, assisted by skilled and well-equipped contractors — it was very difficult to start this snail-paced profession. (Note: traduction du roumain d'un passage de la page 31.)" Socolescu was one of the key figures and a staunch advocate of the Romanian national architectural style, also known as the Neo brâncovenesc style or Neo-Romanian style. His work was particularly influenced by the Brâncovenesc style. He was deeply influenced by Ion Mincu, whom he regarded as his mentor and declared himself his disciple, (Note: pages 22, 31, 33, 36, 44, 90, 93, 127, 135 and 179.) (Note: pages 100, 107, 110–111, 183, 216–219.) the founder of Neo-Romanian architecture, (Note: page 86.) and a lifelong defender of Mincu's work and legacy. (Note: page 179.) (Note: pages 100, 107, 216–219.) However, Socolescu’s work was not defined by a single style but rather by eclecticism. He succeeded in enriching the Neo-Romanian style and diversifying it by embracing technological innovations, including reinforced concrete, while integrating emerging artistic trends such as Art Deco and Modern architecture. (Note: pages 100–101, 107–109, 135, 139.) Clear examples of his work include the market halls in Ploiești, (Note: pages 144–154.) the tower of Saint John the Baptist Cathedral, (Note: pages 183–185.) and the primary school in Păulești. (Note: page 164.)

On her book on the architects Socolescu, Gabriela Petrescu explains that Toma T. Socolescu always adhered to certain principles in all his works, whether they were individual houses or apartment buildings:

- No innovation at all costs; quality is the primary condition for modern Romanian architecture.
- The building plans are designed based on the shape and dimensions of the plot. Along with the house plan, the architect studies the terrain and organizes the spaces by creating terraces, rectangular or circular shapes.
- Although he designed his projects at a time when the principles of modern architecture were gaining ground, Socolescu did not abandon the eclectic style in his plans.
- When designing houses, the architect takes into account the optimal orientation of the building and rooms relative to the cardinal points.
- Toma T. Socolescu studied the projects down to the smallest construction details.
- The plastic resolution of the dwellings, whether villas or apartment buildings, is characterized by the interpretation of elements from ancient Romanian architecture, such as porches, open terraces with pillars or columns foișór and frames.
- The architect used combinations of high-quality construction materials such as stone, metal, concrete, brick, very well executed, which confer strength and durability to the constructions. (Note: Translation from Romanian of a passage on page 139.)

He works tirelessly to beautify Ploiești and to construct public buildings for the entire Prahova County. Interested in archaeology, he studies and preserves old houses and churches, publishing studies and surveys in this field.

He also plays a central role within the leadership of the Society of Romanian Architects and is actively involved in the cultural and social life of his hometown. He even served as mayor from December 1919 to March 1920. For him, the artistic component of architecture is a fundamental element of this art.

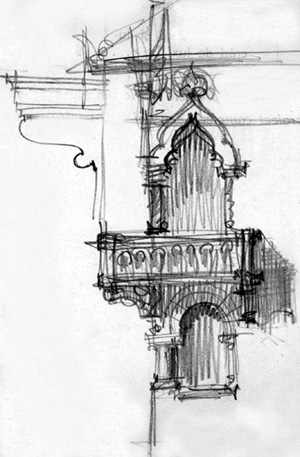
Balcony illustration. Extract from Toma T. Socolescu's sketchbook.

Socolescu remained highly critical of architecture that had no connection to art, particularly architecture that lacked ties to traditional Romanian art. He viewed the significant increase in the number of architecture students—without the necessity of artistic talent for pursuing the profession—as a mistake. In his memoirs, he harshly criticizes the modern architects of the 1920s to 1940s who, according to him, neglected the artistic foundations of the architectural profession. He also denounces projects where only spatial planning is considered, driven by extensive real estate speculation, political corruption, and influence peddling, especially in Bucharest. Furthermore, he observes the lack of hygiene in the housing built in Romania from 1900 to the 1950s, in contrast to the far more advanced construction standards of France, Austria, and Germany during the same period. (Note: pages 92-95.)

[...] Not to mention the fortune of certain politicians, both in the old kingdom and in the annexed provinces, some of whom bought properties and built true castles of dazzling luxury, with black parquet brought from India, and leading a lifestyle they had never dreamed of. From all this wealth, made overnight by these national sybarites, were born the large buildings of Bucharest, as well as the speculation of a few entrepreneurs who built to later sell apartments to various capital and provincial buyers—an investment for many individuals who wanted to secure their uncertain money in something safe and profitable. The construction of these buildings was a mere commercial affair, and thus could not give rise to architecture because it lacked it. But the sites led to speculation beyond any acceptable limit—right under the noses of the city planners at the capital’s town hall—covering almost the entire site with buildings, a true disgrace for public hygiene. (Note: Translation from Romanian of a passage on page 93, describing his view of the real estate situation between the 1920s and 1945.)

In 1938, concluding his historical study on the architecture of Ploiești, Toma T. Socolescu wrote:

We live in a confused era, during which it seems that no one knows what they want, and from this arises the chaos of so-called modern buildings, the result of a time when science, engineering calculations, and a nearly superficial understanding of architectural knowledge have overshadowed the beauty cultivated and passed down through the centuries that preceded us, standardizing everything and thus creating cold and clumsy works of civilization on the ruins of those of culture, those that gave us the tradition and genius of this people, raised in the cult of beauty. (Note: Translation from Romanian of the last paragraph of the conclusion, page 72.) (Note: page 212.)

=== In Ploiești ===
Mayor of Ploiești just after the 1916–1918 conflict, while simultaneously holding the position of chief architect, (Note: pages 84–85.) Toma T. Socolescu was tasked with addressing the city’s major supply issues. During his short four-month term, he reshaped the vision for the city and laid out development and transformation axes that would give Ploiești a new dimension.

He was the initiator of the project to expand the city’s boundaries, incorporating the refineries located on its outskirts. This allowed the city to benefit from the taxes these facilities were obliged to pay. (Note: pages 81 and 84.) (Note: pages 612 and 615.) As a result, the city’s budget tripled, reaching a critical mass that enabled the major infrastructure works needed for a rapidly growing city, as well as essential public services: "street paving, expansion of water and electricity distribution networks, introduction of town gas for heating, construction of new school buildings and dispensaries". (Note: pages 83–84.)

He demonstrated his talent as an urban planner, (Note: Chapter "Municipal Administration and Urban Planning" (Edilitate și Urbanism), pages 577–620. In 1937, the architect provided a detailed and data-driven analysis of the urban development of Ploiești since 1820, along with proposed future projects. Some of these would later be resumed after the war.) (Note: In 1939, the Superior Commission for Systematization Plans officially recognized Toma T. Socolescu, along with other architects— Petre Antonescu, Iosif Bedeus, Roger Bolomey, Ion Davidescu, Ernest Doneaud, Grigore Ionescu, Duiliu Marcu, C. Minescu, T. Popescu, Florea Stănculescu, and Alexandru Zamphiropol, as urban planners (page 103).) by planning major changes: he decided to relocate the meat and vegetable market, until then held in makeshift stalls in front of the town hall, to a paved market area within the old market hall, located in front of the current market hall. He also proposed revising and completing Lindley’s alignment plan, (Note: page 81 - In 1938, Socolescu wrote in his authoritative work on architecture in Ploiești: "In 1902–1904, a complete and definitive map was drawn by the Army's geographical service, showing all public and private properties within the boundaries of the former Ploești estate. Based on this map, hydrologist Lindley drew up in 1910 a type of systematization plan, which he called an "alignment plan", in which he reorganized the city’s streets through various corrections and widenings, creating many new streets, such as a peripheral boulevard. Alignments were executed according to this plan until 1932, when under the term of Mr. Ștefan Moțoiu.) transforming it into a true systematization plan, and proposed the creation of a second neighborhood market, known as Anton Măcelaru. He also looked to the future by planning the construction of a modern market hall and a new City Hall, as the current one had become inadequate. (Note: page 608.) He further requested the recovery of a portion of the Domaine Bereasa or Moșia Bereasa, today’s Bereasca district, from a previously executed expropriation, with the intention of creating a communal park in an elevated position, close to the nearest gateway to the city center. This proposal, however, was not pursued by subsequent mayors. (Note: page 84.) (Note: page 615.)

He would later carry out in the 1930s, as an architect, one of the key elements of the plan he had envisioned 15 years earlier as a municipal official: the construction of the Central market halls of Ploiești. (Note: Between pages 597 and 603, there is a detailed architectural and technical description, along with illustrations.)

Almost all of the architectural projects not completed during his brief term were carried out by the mayors who followed. (Note: pages 435 and 615.)

Throughout his life, he contributed to the improvement of the city of Ploiești in terms of urban planning, hygiene, and development. From 1932 to 1935, in collaboration with architects Ion Davidescu and Simion Vasilescu, he developed a new systematization plan (Note: pages 616–634.) for the city. This plan aimed to give greater importance to green spaces, road and rail traffic, and, more generally, to organize the city’s harmonious growth. The plan defined optimal urban development and population density, the distribution of public and cultural institutions, schools, and green areas. It also detailed the regulations that would correspond today to land-use plans. Similar plans were drawn up by the architect, assisted by his son Toma Barbu Socolescu, for the towns of Câmpina and Mizil in the 1940s. (Note: pages 103 and 193.) These projects were implemented until the communists took control of city planning in 1945. This type of plan, standard in urban architecture and present in all major cities, known as systematization, should not be confused with the large-scale destruction carried out by the communists, also referred to as systematization.

=== In Păulești ===
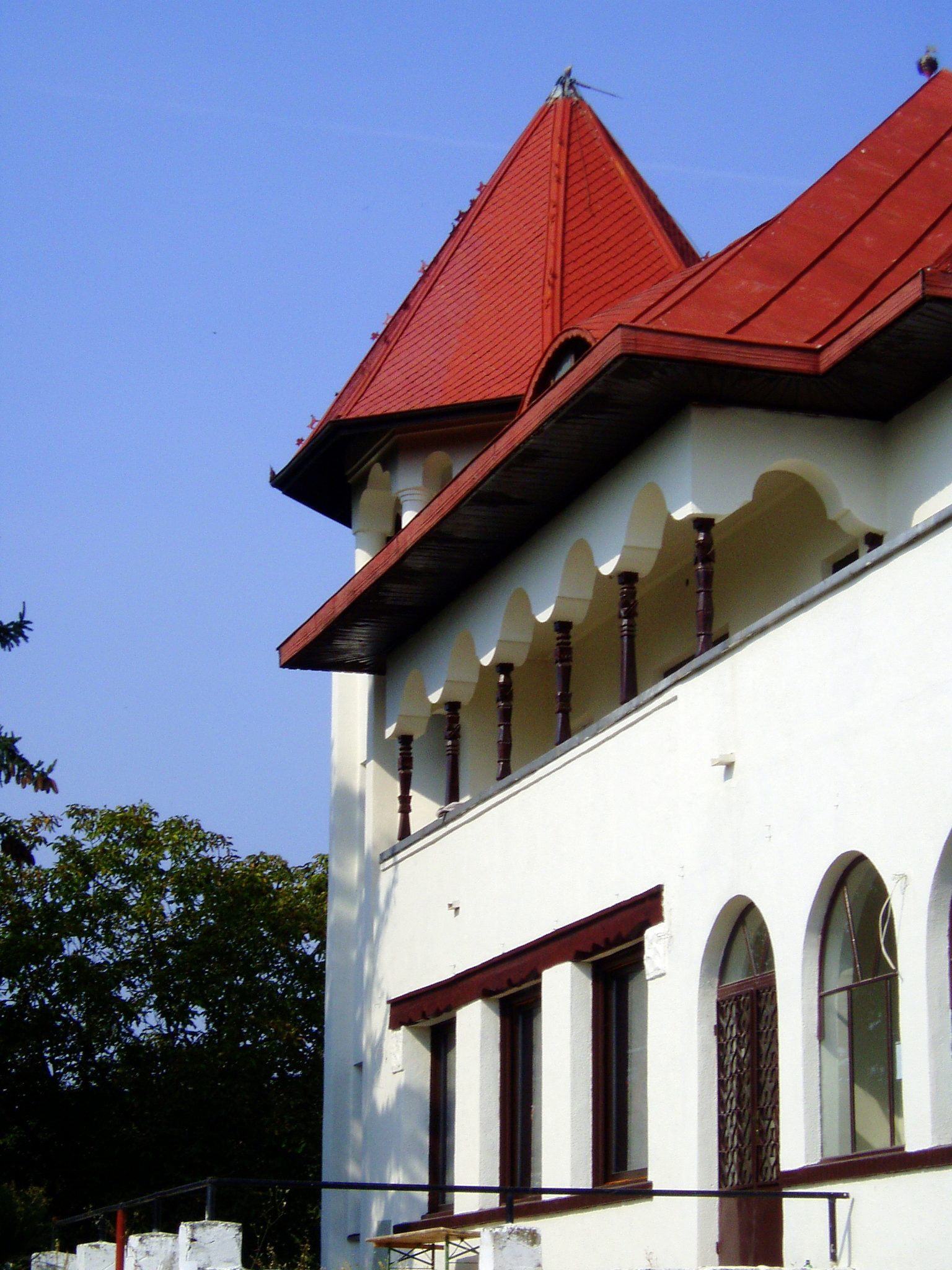
Duqué manor in Păulești.

He was also actively involved in the small commune of Păulești following his move there in 1927. He served as mayor from February 1938 to January 1945, a term interrupted by the Legionary regime between November 1940 and February 1942. His second mandate was also cut short by the communists in January 1945. (Note: page 103.) In just five and a half years, he built nearly all of the public buildings, bridges, and monuments in the commune, including the town hall, the primary school, the communal stable, the public baths, and a Trinity monument made of carved oak, mounted on a base decorated with a bronze bas-relief, in 1939. (Note: pages 488, 492, 500 and 501.) The Trinity monument was damaged and deteriorated during the communist period, after losing its base and being relocated to the entrance of the cemetery. (Note: pages 202, 203 and 501.) He also created various landscaped areas, including the commune’s park, known as Parcul cu castani, (Note: page 501.) and in particular, a chestnut-lined alley that ran through the park and led to the cemetery.

He had wished for a leisure park and an ornamental pond to be built in this area, in order to offer the inhabitants of Ploiești (Păulești is located only 7 km from Ploiești) a large green and recreational space. The project began around 1930 but could not be completed before the Second World War. It was revived under the name Parc Pădurea Păulești starting in 1995. After numerous legal disputes between the authorities and the company in charge of the construction, the project was interrupted and reactivated in July 2007. (Note: page 206.) The works finally resumed in 2009.

In 2007, in recognition of the contributions made by the architect, the commune's secondary school was renamed Arhitect T. T. Socolescu (Architect Toma T. Socolescu). At the end of May 2011, a solemn ceremony paid tribute to the architect with the inauguration of a bust in his likeness, placed in the courtyard of the same school.

== Cultural and artistic work ==
Wishing to develop the cultural life of his city, Toma T. Socolescu launched numerous initiatives that provided the județ of Prahova with its first museums and cultural institutions. Supported by the enlightened personalities of Ploiești and by Nicolae Iorga, he founded its first history museum, its first public library, and its first fine arts museum. (Note: pages 103 and 188.)

=== Regional Museum of Prahova ===
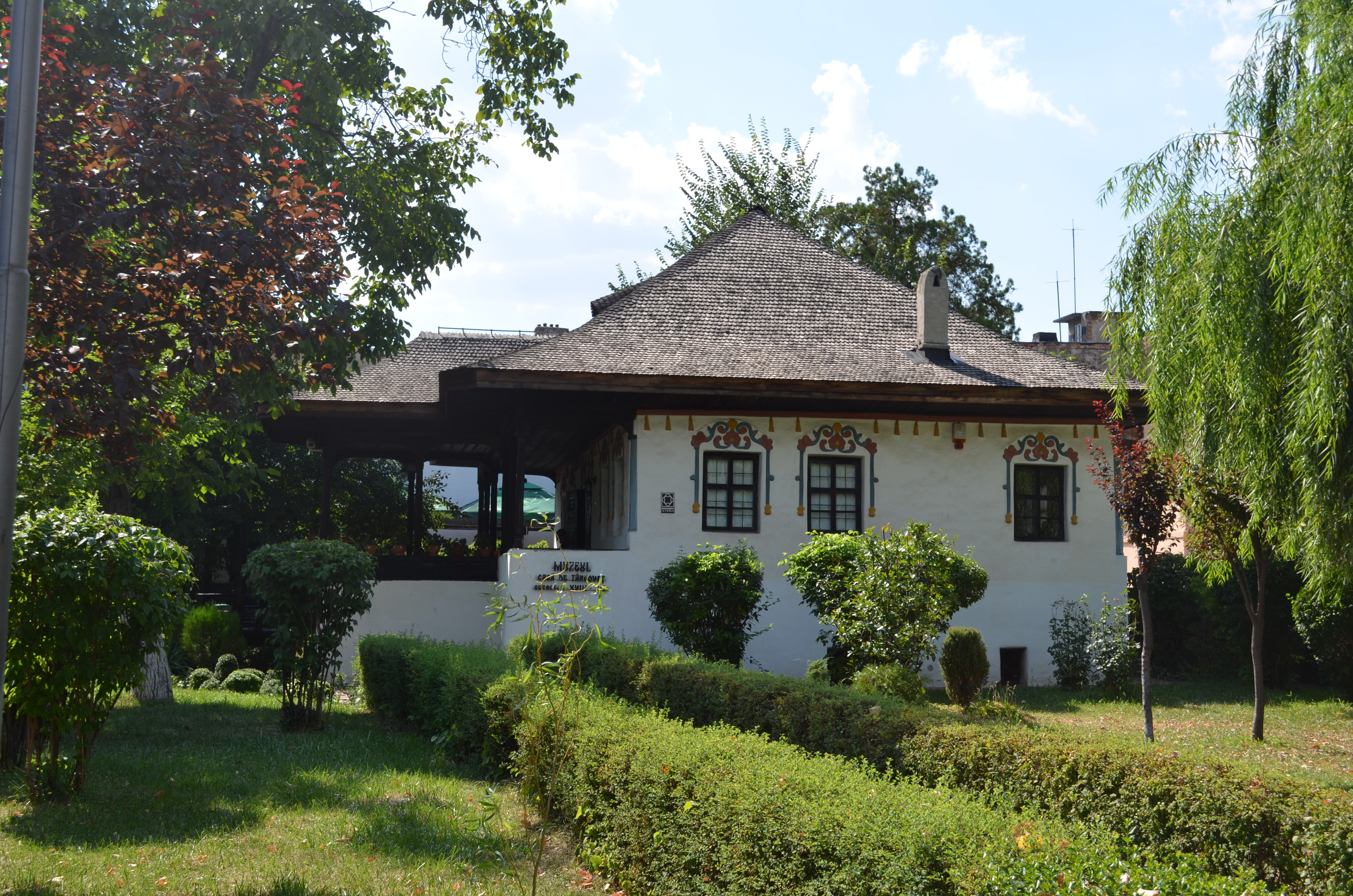
The house of the merchant and coppersmith Hagi Prodan.

Around 1914, with the help of Nicolae Iorga, who interceded with Ion Duca, then Minister of Education, Toma T. Socolescu saved from destruction (Note: page 43.) a historic building dating from the 18th century, preserved in its original form: the house of the merchant and coppersmith Hagi Prodan (Casa Hagi Prodan). In 1919, as chief architect of the județ, he took the initiative to found a "small regional ethnographic and religious art museum" (Note: page 23.) (Note: page 163.) of the județ of Prahova, in this same house. It thus became home to the city's first museum originally called muzeul județului or muzeul Prahovei. (Note: page 70.) (Note: page 210.) (Note: pages 64, 177, 259, and 260.)

After launching a public appeal and a successful fundraising campaign, he collected numerous notable art objects from across the județ—with the help of local priests and schoolteachers. The museum thus acquired forgotten furniture, clothing, and icons discovered in regional attics. Nicolae Iorga, then President of the Commission for Historic Monuments, contributed many additional pieces of historical value. Items and furnishings were stored in the cellars of the Prefecture of Ploiești between 1940 and 1944 but were ultimately lost or stolen during the communist period. They were later replaced by other objects gathered by Professor Nicolae Simache, to whom the architect lent his assistance. (Note: note 43, page 85.) Known as Muzeul Hagi Prodan since 1953, the museum was renamed on 18 June 2005 as Casa de Târgoveț from the 18th–19th Century.

=== Popular University Nicolae Iorga ===
A political and cultural companion of Nicolae Iorga, Toma T. Socolescu actively participated in the Summer Courses established by the historian in Vălenii de Munte in 1911. In addition to designing the plans for the classrooms, the architect frequently gave lectures there, alongside numerous professors and prominent figures from Romanian cultural and political life. (Note: pages 43–44)

As the Summer Universities of Iorga gained fame and scale, their opening ceremonies drew major political figures and serving ministers, including Take Ionescu, Ion C. Inculeț, and Petre Andrei. King Ferdinand I, Prince Carol, and Princess Elisabeth of Romania also attended Iorga's lectures. On 17 August 1938, Maria Tănase performed during the closing ceremony.

=== Popular Library Nicolae Iorga ===
Socolescu also founded in 1920, partly through a public subscription, the Biblioteca Populară Nicolae Iorga, initially installed on the upper floor of the right wing of the municipal baths building, (Note: Demolished by the communist regime around 1955 to make way for featureless apartment blocks - History and period photographs of the municipal baths: Lucian Vasile (17 April 2010). "Palatul Băilor Municipale" [The Municipal Bath Palace]. republicaploiesti.net (Republica Ploiești - Povești despre vechiul Ploiești) (in Romanian).) a building designed by his father, Toma N. Socolescu. As head of the Management Committee, he continuously expanded the library's collection, notably thanks to generous donors. (Note: pages 92–93) (Note: pages 818–819) Inaugurated on 20 March 1921, (Note: page 818) it originally held 1,250 volumes. The collection grew rapidly, reaching over 11,000 books and 3,500 publications by 1937, which were available for consultation and lending free of charge to over 8,000 registered readers. The library was later integrated into the Nicolae Iorga Cultural Institution, of which the architect served as president for many years. The institution benefited from increasingly substantial public subsidies from its inception. Socolescu himself donated over 250 volumes from his private collection. The library was relocated several times, first following the 1940 earthquake, then due to the Second World War. It was finally given a permanent home in 1956, in the former Palace of Justice, which had been converted by the communist regime into a Palace of Culture.

=== Museum of Fine Arts ===
Alongside the development of the Nicolae Iorga Popular Library on the upper floor of the same building, Socolescu founded and expanded a pinacotheca by acquiring reproductions of Western European painters as well as original Romanian oil paintings and watercolors. (Note: pages 80–92.) (Note: pages 816–818.) He was assisted by a group of Ploiești intellectuals, including lawyer, art collectors, writer and politician Ion Ionescu-Quintus, (Note: Ion Ionescu-Quintus (1875–1933) was the fifth son of Ghiță Ionescu, the prominent Ploiești banker, merchant and politician (1833–1898): pages 429–430: Ghiță Ionescu.; pages 435–435: Ion Ionescu-Quintus.) and historian Dumitru Munteanu-Râmnic, (Note: Cultural figure, high‑school teacher, historian, politician (Vice‑President of the Central Committee of the nationalist‑democratic party founded by Nicolae Iorga, of which the architect was also a member), deputy in 1919–1920, Deputy Mayor of Chișinău, Under‑Secretary of State at the Ministry of Interior in 1931–1932, deputy of the Orthodox ecclesiastical assembly of Prahova, journalist and editor of several publications including România Viitoare, Gazeta Cărţilor, Bibliotecii şcoalei secundare, Dreptatea, the Bulletin de L'association generale des professeurs secondaires roumains (en français dans le texte), founder of the Liberal and Popular University, Corresponding Member of the Commission of Historic Monuments, member of the Ateneul Român and the Cultural League of Romanians (Ligii Culturale a Românilor). See pages 392, 395, 716, 721, 792, 798, 800, 810 and 819.) as well as by successive mayors of the city, including Ștefan Moțoiu, a major merchant and mayor of Ploiești between 1931 and 1932, (Note: pages 423, 437–438.) who provided substantial financial support to the project.

Within the framework of the Nicolae Iorga Cultural Institution, created circa 1930 and presided over by the architect, the pinacotheca became the Museum of Fine Arts of Ploiești. It was inaugurated by the architect in November 1931. The opening address was published in full in Amintiri. (Note: pages 86–87.) It was not until 1965 that the museum was relocated to its current building: the Ghiță Ionescu Palace, the former Prefecture of the județ.

In Arhitectura în Ploești, studiu istoric (Note: pages 85–92.) and in Monografia orașului Ploești (Note: pp. 811–818.) one can find photographs, a list of all the painters exhibited, and selected notable works present in the museum in 1938. At that time, it was housed in the former municipal baths.

Some oil paintings and watercolors by Toma T. Socolescu, donated to the museum, still exist, as do works by painter Toma Gheorghe Tomescu, but they are not displayed in the museum's galleries.

=== Exhibitions and Painting ===
Toma T. Socolescu was also a painter, watercolorist, and draftsman. He produced numerous watercolors which met with a certain success. Among his close friends was the Romanian painter Toma Gheorghe Tomescu, originally from Vălenii de Munte in Prahova, for whom he built a house in the same village in 1926–1927. (Note: page 204.) He purchased many of Tomescu's works, which he later donated to the muzeul Prahovei.

In the spring of 1916, the architect organized an exhibition of architectural projects, watercolors, and church furnishings, held at the Romanian Athenaeum in Bucharest. (Note: pages 53–56.) (Note: pages 178 and 180.) The painter Toma Gheorghe Tomescu, a friend of the architect, exhibited his oil paintings and watercolors there. (Note: pages 86 and 88. Toma T. Socolescu extensively describes the painter's style and work. He was a great Romanian watercolorist.) (Note: pages 812 and 814.) Nearly all of the paintings by the architect and Tomescu were sold. The architect Spiridon Cegăneanu, one of the founders, together with Ion Mincu, of the Neo-Romanian style, wrote an article in the Cronica journal, (Note: pages 55–56.) mentioning the architect's projects. This was the first and only exhibition of Toma Gheorghe Tomescu.

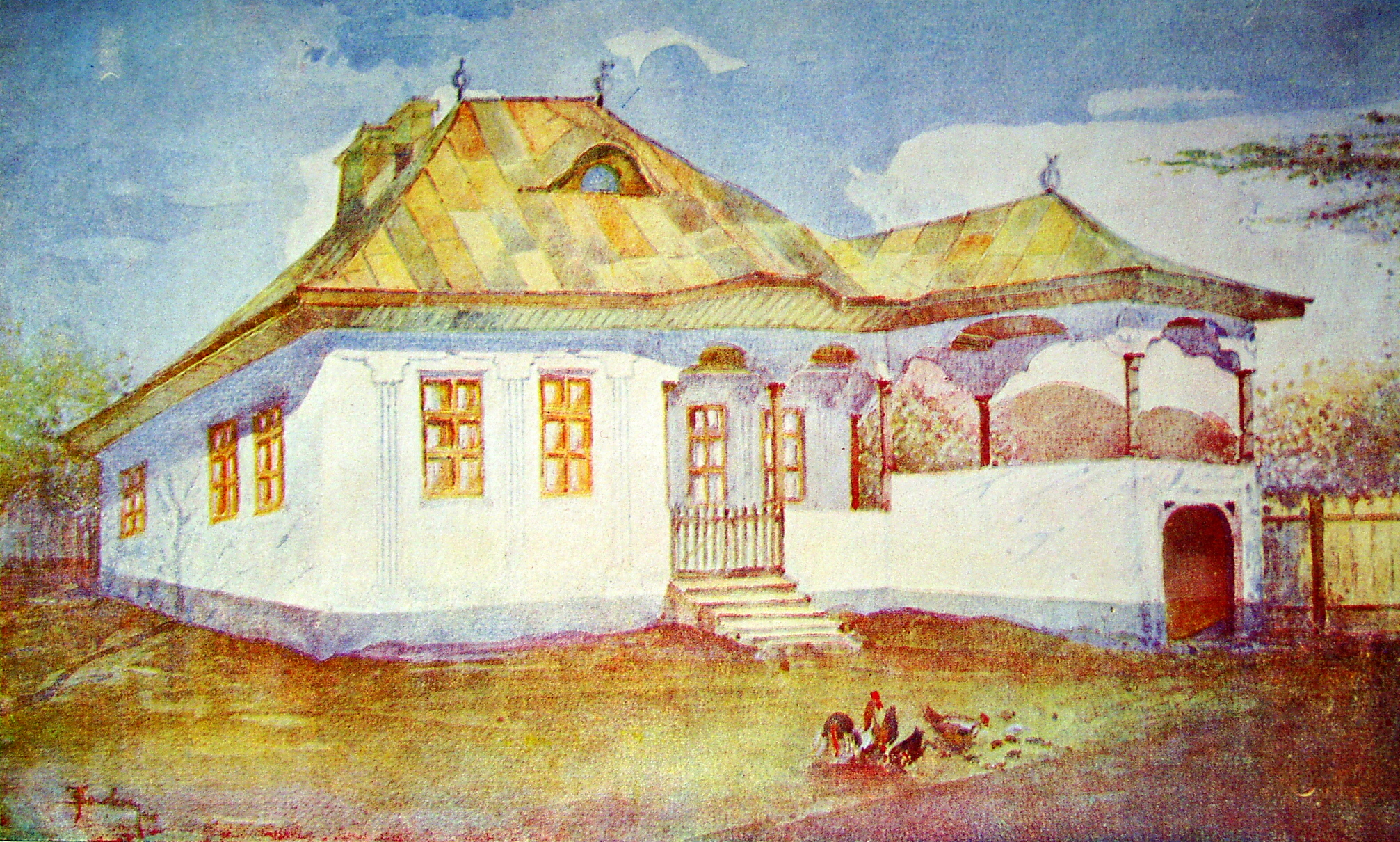
Watercolor painted by Toma T. Socolescu and later donated to the muzeul judetului in the 1920s–1930s. Subject: the house of Petre Ion, known as Boiangiul, located on strada Ulierului in Ploiești.

== Archaeology and heritage conservation ==
Toma T. Socolescu completed his studies in civil and religious architecture, with a specialization in Romanian archaeology. He consistently demonstrated a strong interest in the history of architecture and the preservation of architectural heritage. In addition to his work on the renovation of historical churches, he collaborated multiple times with Nicolae Iorga, President of the Commission for Historic Monuments since 1919, to safeguard significant ancient buildings in the județ of Prahova.

His main achievement in Ploiești was the renovation, around 1919, of the house of the metal trader, Hagi Prodan, built in 1785. It is considered a typical residence of a merchant from Ploiești in the 18th and 19th centuries. Classified as a historical monument, the casa Hagi Prodan became the first History Museum of the city of Ploiești, a museum founded by Toma T. Socolescu. After changing its purpose and name, the museum is now known as the Casa de Târgoveț din Secolul al XVIII-lea - al XIX-lea. The original furniture and objects collected by the architect around 1919 were moved during World War II to Iași, then stored in the basement of the Ploiești Prefecture, and eventually disappeared in the 1950s, either destroyed or stolen by the Communists. The only remaining traces of these items are the descriptions and photographs published in Arhitectura în Ploești, studiu istoric, pages 87 to 90, and in Monografia orașului Ploești, pages 813 to 816.

Around 1919-1920, he rediscovered and made preliminary repairs to a small, ruined archaic church in Ploieștiori, a village in the Blejoi commune. (Note: pages 69-70.) (Note: pages 209-210.) The church was dated to the first half of the 18th century, based on research by Ioan C. Filitti. (Note: Socolescu cites excerpts from I. C. Filitti's book: Biserica şi ctitori, which published his study in the journal "Biserica ortodoxă română", in the February–March 1932 issue, pages 30-31 - page 71.) He saved icons and religious art objects, which he deposited at the county museum. Initially housed in the casa Hagi Prodan, the muzeul județului no longer exists under this name. The current location of these objects is unknown. They may now be found in one of the museums that merged in 1955 into the institution: Muzeul județean de Istorie și Arheologie Prahova, an institution to which the Hagi Prodan House is affiliated. In 1929, Socolescu brought Nicolae Iorga, who uncovered very old murals hidden under plaster. An article on this was written by the historian in the Bulletin of the Commission for Historic Monuments. The church, named Saint Visarion (Sfântul Visarion), is classified as a historical monument. In October 2009, the ruins were completely abandoned and in danger of total disappearance. The communal land where they stood was sold in the 1990s by the mayor of the commune to a private owner. However, in 2023, at the initiative of Father Gabriel, the priest of the Orthodox parish of Saint Dimitru Church (Sfântul Dumitru) in Ploieștiori, the old church is being reconstructed under the direction of architect Lorin Niculae, a professor at the Ion Mincu University of Architecture, with the help of students from the same university.

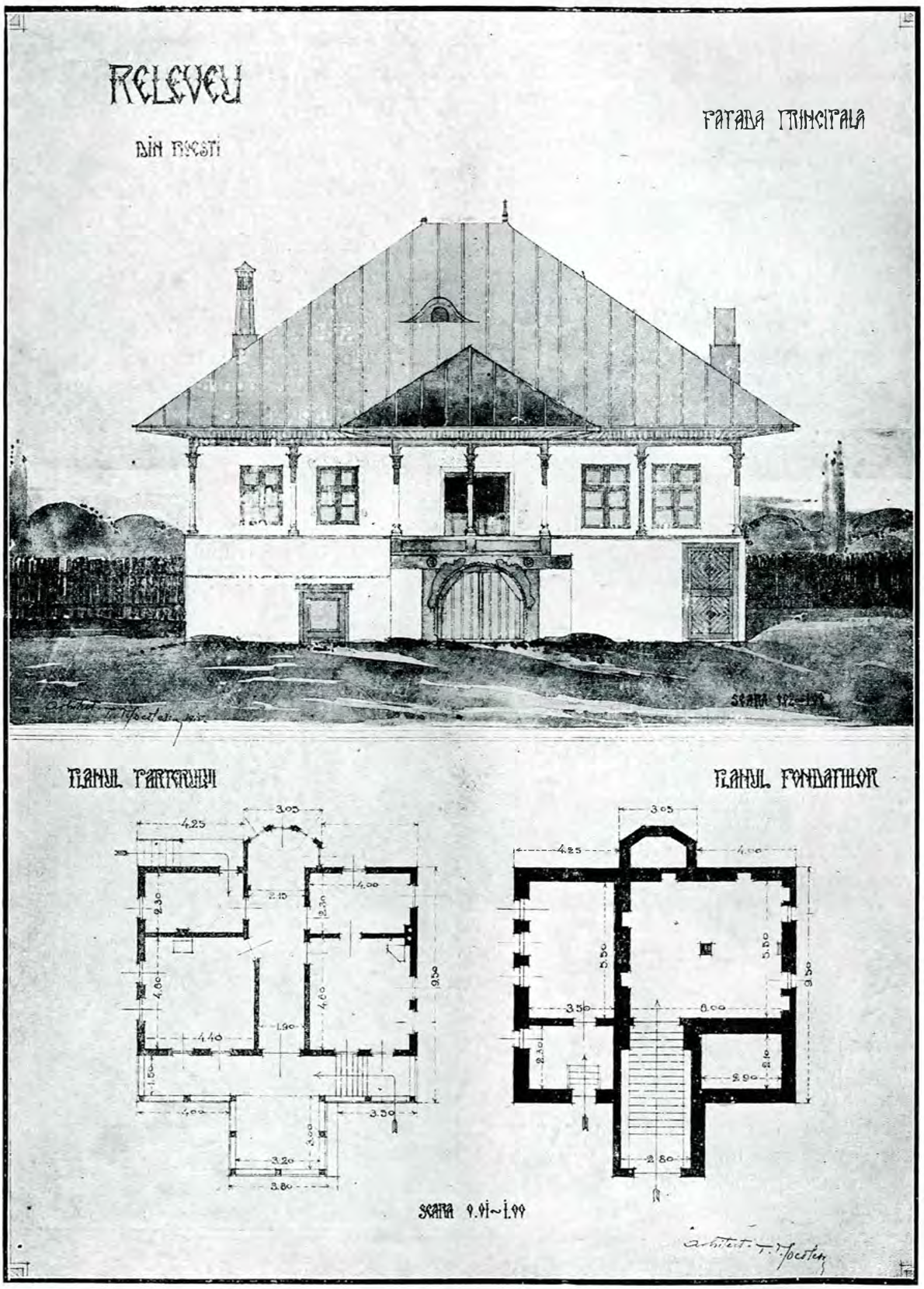
Facade, floor, and foundations.

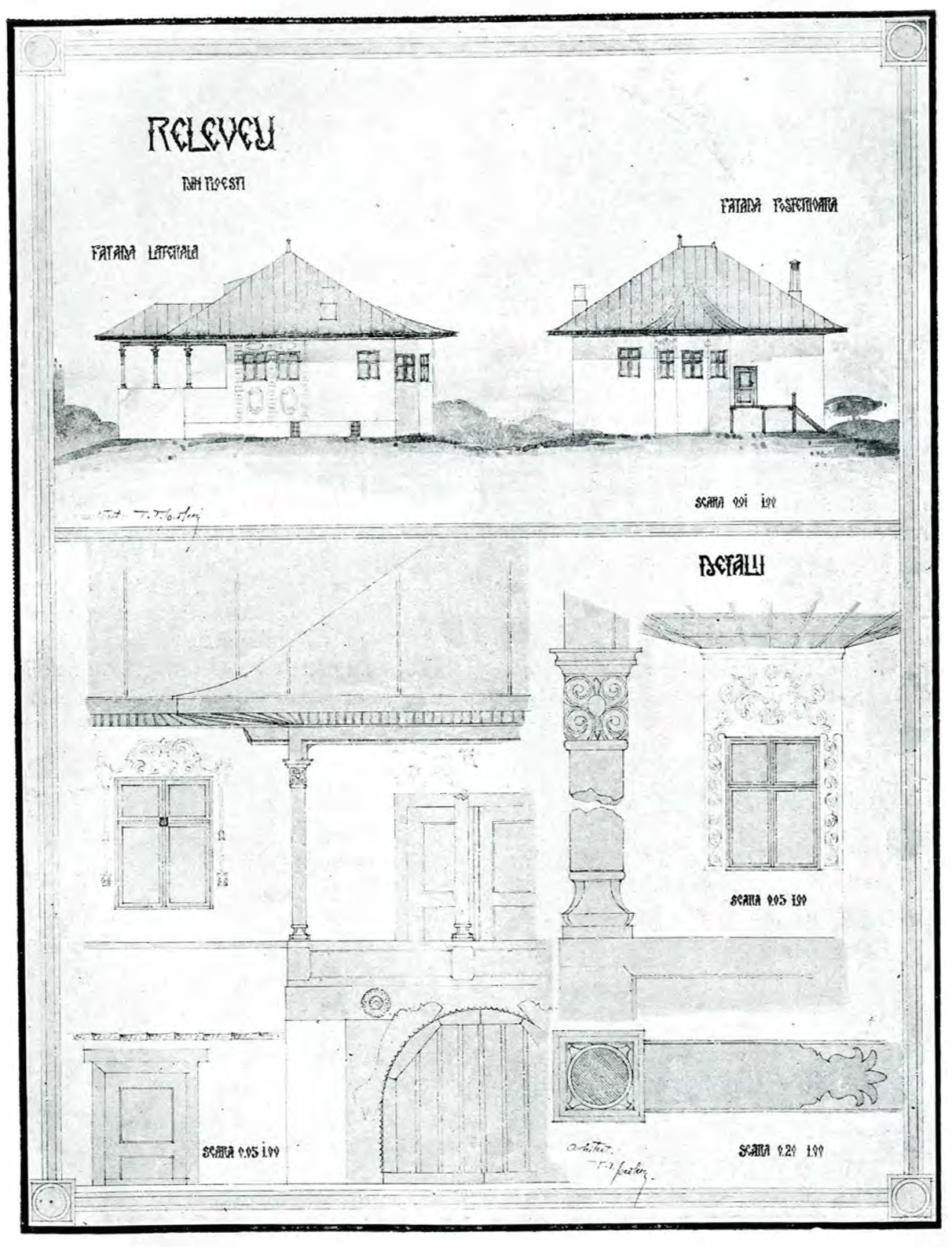
Wings and details.

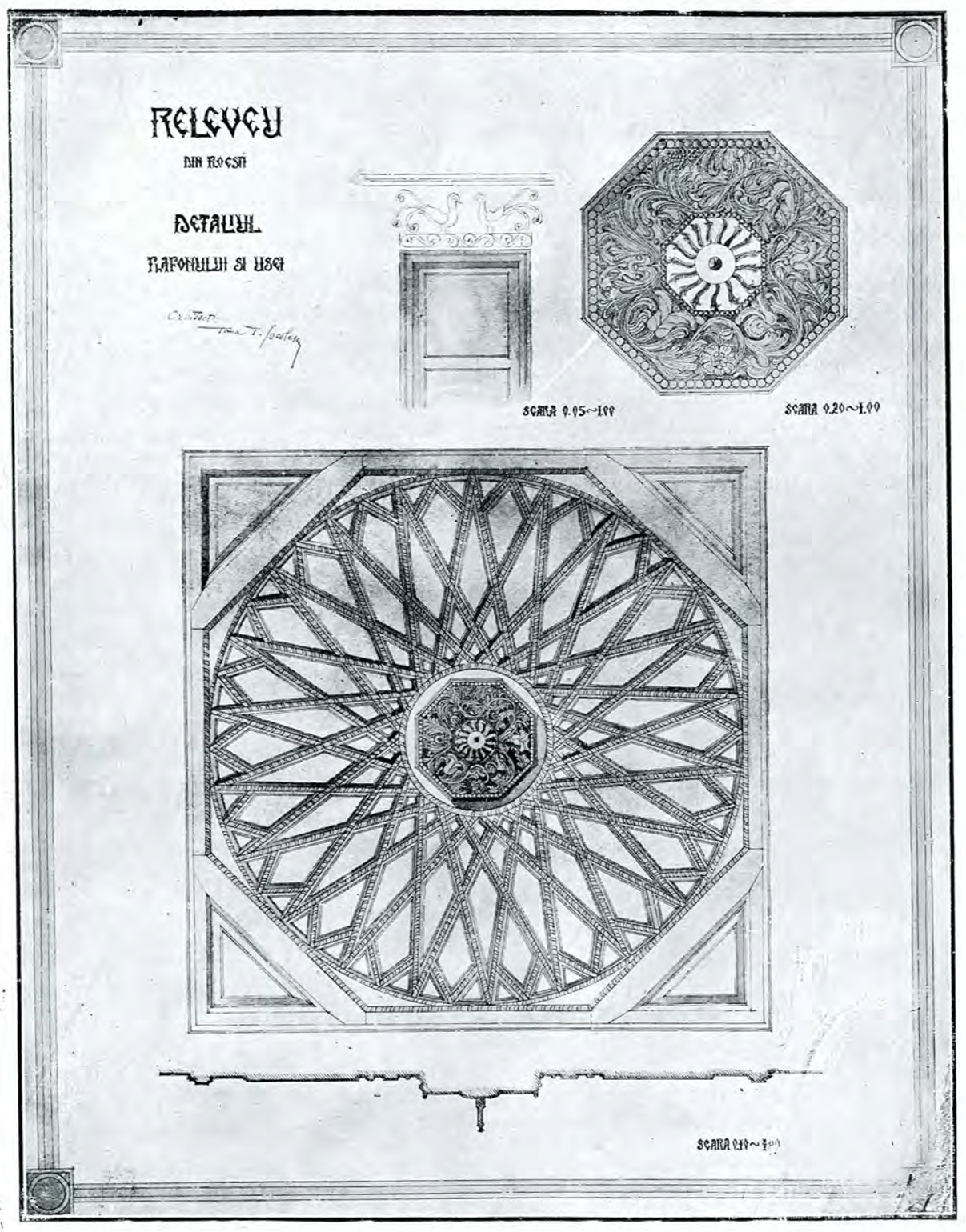
Ceiling and door.

The surveys of the Hagi Prodan House, BCMI, 1916.

Probably in 1925, he conducted archaeological studies and surveys of the casa Dobrescu in Ploiești, a typical house of early 19th century merchants. (Note: pages 20-21.) (Note: pages 160-161.) The house, located at No. 6 strada Kutuzov, later became the Ion L. Caragiale Museum on 30 January 1962. The building is classified as a historical monument.

In 1912, the priest Ene Dumitrescu proposed enlisting Toma T. Socolescu to design the reconstruction project for the Saint Pantelimon Church in Ploiești. (Note: pages 178, 180 et 203.) (Note: pages 178, 180, and 203.) located at No. 71 strada Democrației, in Ploiești. The work was carried out over a period of 24 years between 1912 and 1936, due to a lack of funding. (Note: pages 151-152 and 756.) The frescoes alone cost a million lei at the time, a considerable sum, and were exclusively created by the Italian painter Umberto Marchetti, hired by King Carol I to decorate the churches of the Crown's domains. The carpentry and furniture were designed by Socolescu, particularly the solid oak wood paneling running along the walls. (Note: page 756.) The 1940 earthquake caused the collapse of the large tower. The 1977 earthquake damaged the walls. Two phases of reconstruction and consolidation took place, in 1946 and again between 1977 and 1994, including the restoration of the frescoes. The original neoclassical-renaissance style frescoes were lost during renovations carried out between 1966 and 1967 by another painter. (Note: page 181.)

Also in Ploiești, he renovated, restored, and carried out exterior embellishments on the Saint Haralambie Church, between 1931 and 1932. It is located at No. 65 strada Mărașești. The church originally had three wooden towers, including one large one, all of which were destroyed, along with the roof, in a fire in 1925. (Note: pages 11-12.) (Note: pages 151-152 and 761: the monograph indeed mentions a fire, shortly after 1923, that consumed the three towers of the church.) The architect radically changed the appearance of the church by only reconstructing the small towers on the façade and adding a highly ornate porch in Brâncovenesc style. He also reconstructed a reinforced concrete ceiling. (Note: pages 181 and 205.) The church underwent further consolidations and transformations after the 1940 and 1977. In 1979, the priest in charge of the parish had the large tower, which had previously existed, rebuilt. However, this addition was made without the approval of the civil authorities.

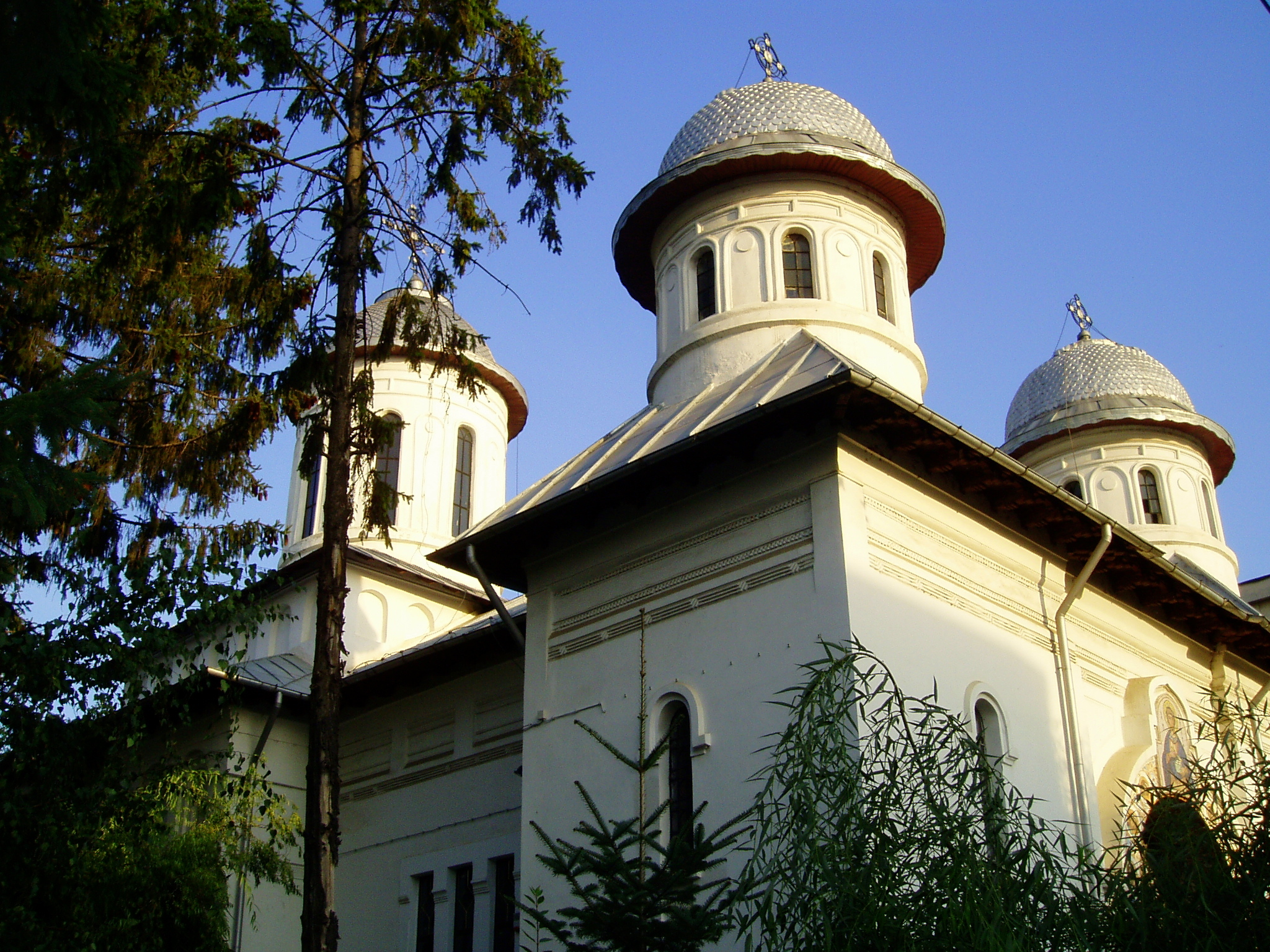
Saint Pantelimon Church.

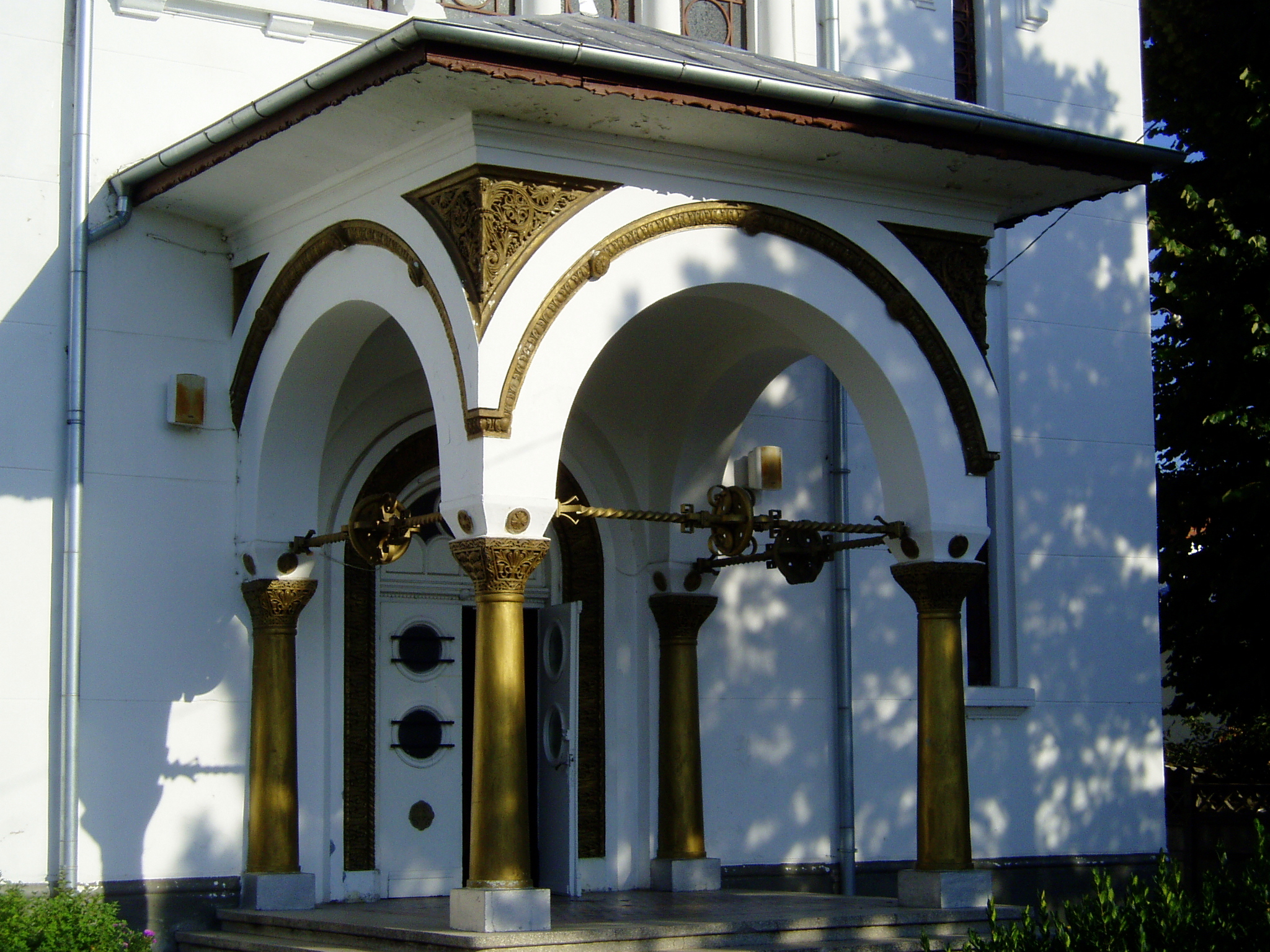
The Neo-Brâncovenesc porch of Saint Haralambie.

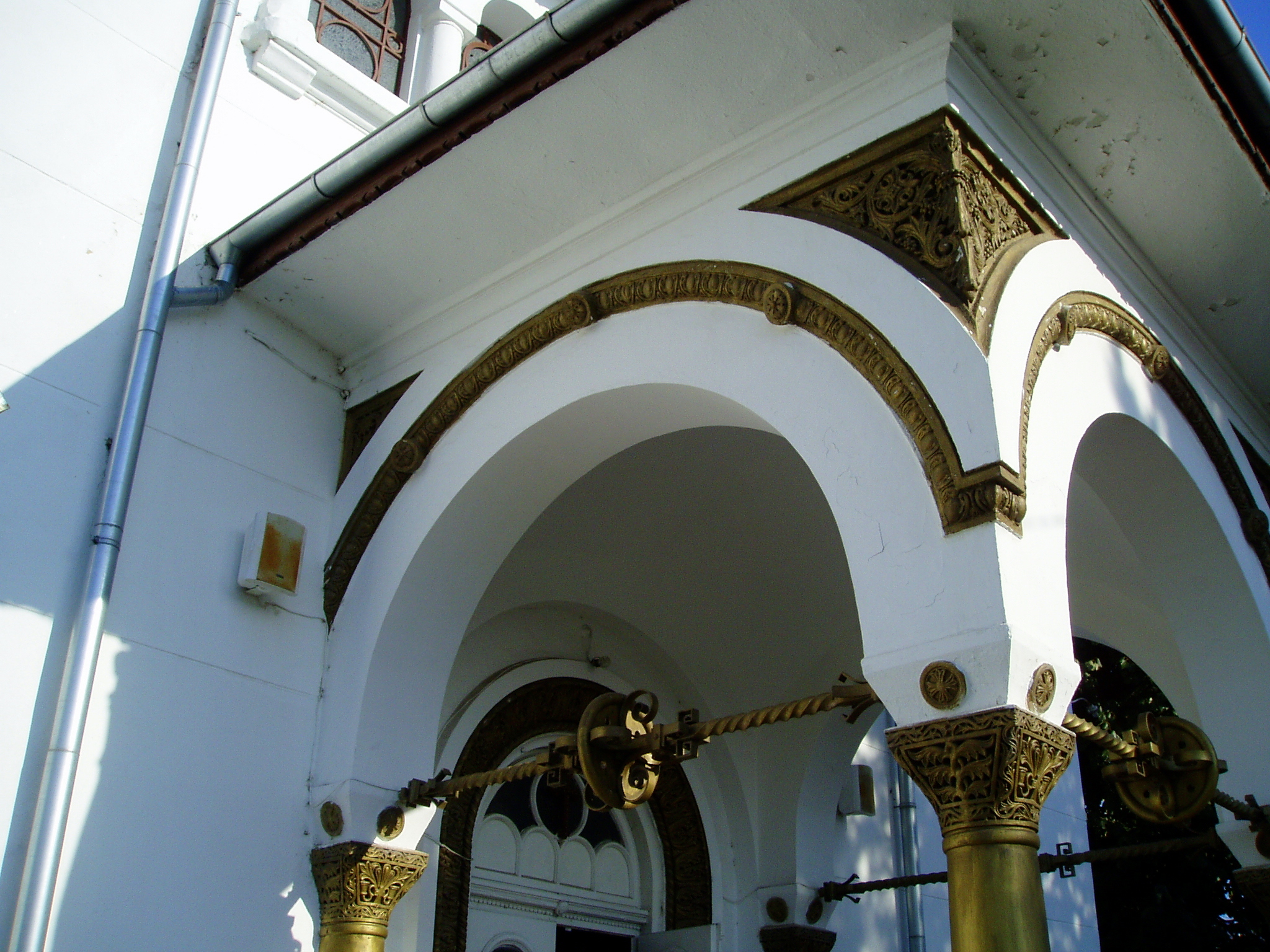
Another view of the same porch.

Religious works by Toma T. Socolescu

The new Saint Dumitru Church, in Ploieștiori or Ploieștiori, a commune of Blejoi, was also reconstructed by Toma T. Socolescu around 1937-1938 in the suburbs of Ploiești, near the Văleni barrier (bariera Văleni), on the side of the Vega refinery. (Note: page 69.) (Note: page 209.) (Note: pages 178, 183, and 205.) The church has undergone several renovations and reconstructions since the architect's work. It suffered significant damage, particularly to its frescoes and paintings, during the 1940 earthquake. It was struck again, though more lightly, by the bombings of 1944 and quickly repaired. Byzantine-style frescoes, painted by the artist Ion Dogărescu, adorn all the walls of the church.

Between 1933 and 1938, Toma T. Socolescu partially reconstructed the Church of the Dormition of the Mother of God and the Holy Emperors Constantine and Helena (Adormirea Maicii Domnului şi Sfinţii Împăraţi Constantin şi Elena) in the village of Măgula, within the commune of Tomșani, under the supervision of the Commission for Historical Monuments. The new church was inaugurated in November 1938. (Note: pages 178, 181, and 205.) The altar and porch of the church are classified as Historical Monuments.

Finally, from 1953 to 1957, for the Department of Historical Monuments, he worked on the restoration of various sites and monuments including the Brebu Monastery (Prahova), the Huniade Castle in Timișoara, the Church of the Holy Emperors Constantine and Helena (Sfânți Împărați Constantin și Elena) in Târgoviște, the churches of Ploeștiori or Ploieștiori in the suburbs of Ploiești, Herești-Ilfov, and other Gothic churches in Transylvania.

A part of the two surveys of the Hagi Prodan and Dobrescu houses were published in the first specialized work on the history of Romanian archaeology, written by architect Grigore Ionescu in 1937 and prefaced by Nicolae Iorga.

== Legacy ==
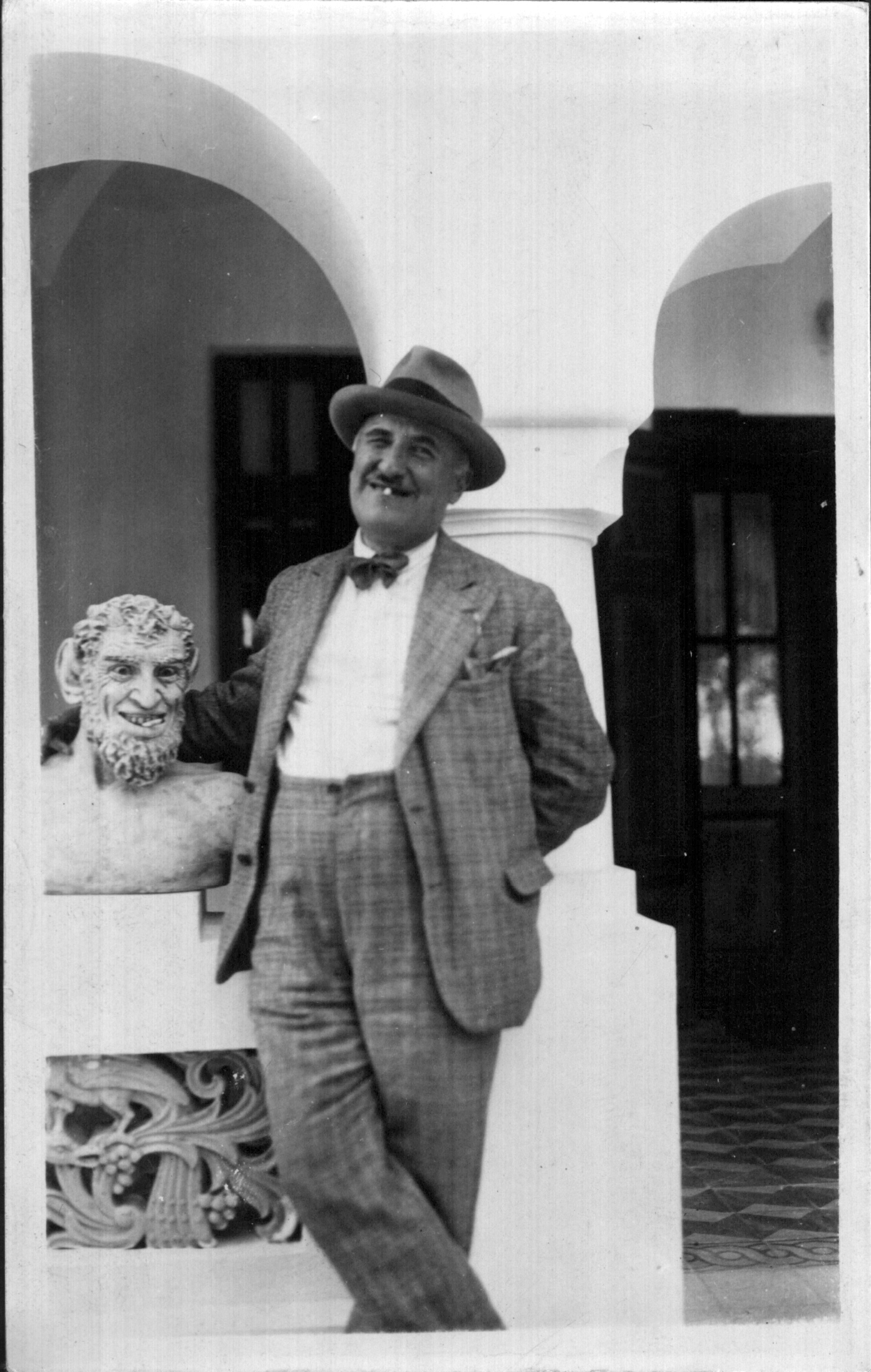
His friend Ion Ionescu-Quintus at the manor of Păulești, circa 1930.

Toma T. Socolescu is still studied at the Ion Mincu University of Architecture and Urbanism and remains an architectural reference in Romania. He is among the great builders who shaped Romania’s modern urban structure and contributed to a form of beauty that was widely recognized up until the end of the interwar period. (Note: pages 197–199.)

There is a technical industrial high school in Ploiești named after his father, the Liceul Toma N. Socolescu, and a technical college of architecture and public works in Bucharest named after his uncle, the Colegiul Ion N. Socolescu. There is also a street in Ploiești still bearing his father’s name (Toma Socolescu).

The architect-professor re-emerged from obscurity in October 2010, when commemorations marking 50 years since his death were held in Ploiești and Păulești. In addition, various ceremonies were organized between 2009 and 2011, including the installation of a bust in front of the Central Market Halls of Ploiești on 14 January 2011, the renaming of the park located in front of in front of the same halls after the architect, as well as the posthumous awarding of the title "Honorary Citizen of the City of Ploiești" on 29 September 2010.

Many of his works were destroyed, partly as a result of the Anglo-American bombings of 1944, which were particularly severe, but also due to the actions of the communist regime and Nicolae Ceaușescu, who systematically sought to erase all traces of Romanian soul and architecture through the "Systematization" program. As with many properties stolen by the Romanian State during the communist totalitarianism period, only a portion of its properties have been partially restituted after long years of struggle against the State and local authorities, in a state of semi-ruin or advanced degradation, within an incomplete legal framework that do not guarantee a proper and honest restitution of the confiscated assets. It should be added that the Romanian situation is peculiar due to a law enacted by Ion Iliescu in 1995 (Law 112/1995), passed after the fall of the communist regime, which allowed tenants of many nationalized properties to buy at a very low price the apartments or houses they occupied, making the restitution in kind of the properties to the rightful owners extremely difficult or even impossible, as with the Socolescu manor in Păulești, or for his building in Ploiești, totally disfigured by a Russian reconstruction in the early 1950s.

His manor in Păulești was nationalized on 21 February 1952 by the communists. Toma T. was expelled shortly thereafter and took refuge for some time at the Suzana Monastery (Commune of Măneciu) where he wrote most of his memoirs. After serving as a barracks, veterinary dispensary, post office, school, and hosting a shoemaker's shop on the upper floor, the residence was returned to his family in the 1990s in a deplorable state and on a much reduced plot compared to its size before confiscation by the Romanian state. The conac (manor in Romanian) of Toma T. was completely looted of all its decorations, ornaments, tiles, and equipment. Numerous constructions built after the fall of communism, including a cooperative, have reduced the land by four fifths of its original surface. The house was listed on the regional list of Historic Monuments, after 45 years of abandonment and neglect by the state. Built by another architect and without any connection to the Socolescu style, amputated from its estate, which was previously shared between vineyards, fruit trees, and an ornamental garden now disappeared, it lost much of its original beauty and harmony. The manor is not any longer in possession of the Socolescu family since August 2010.

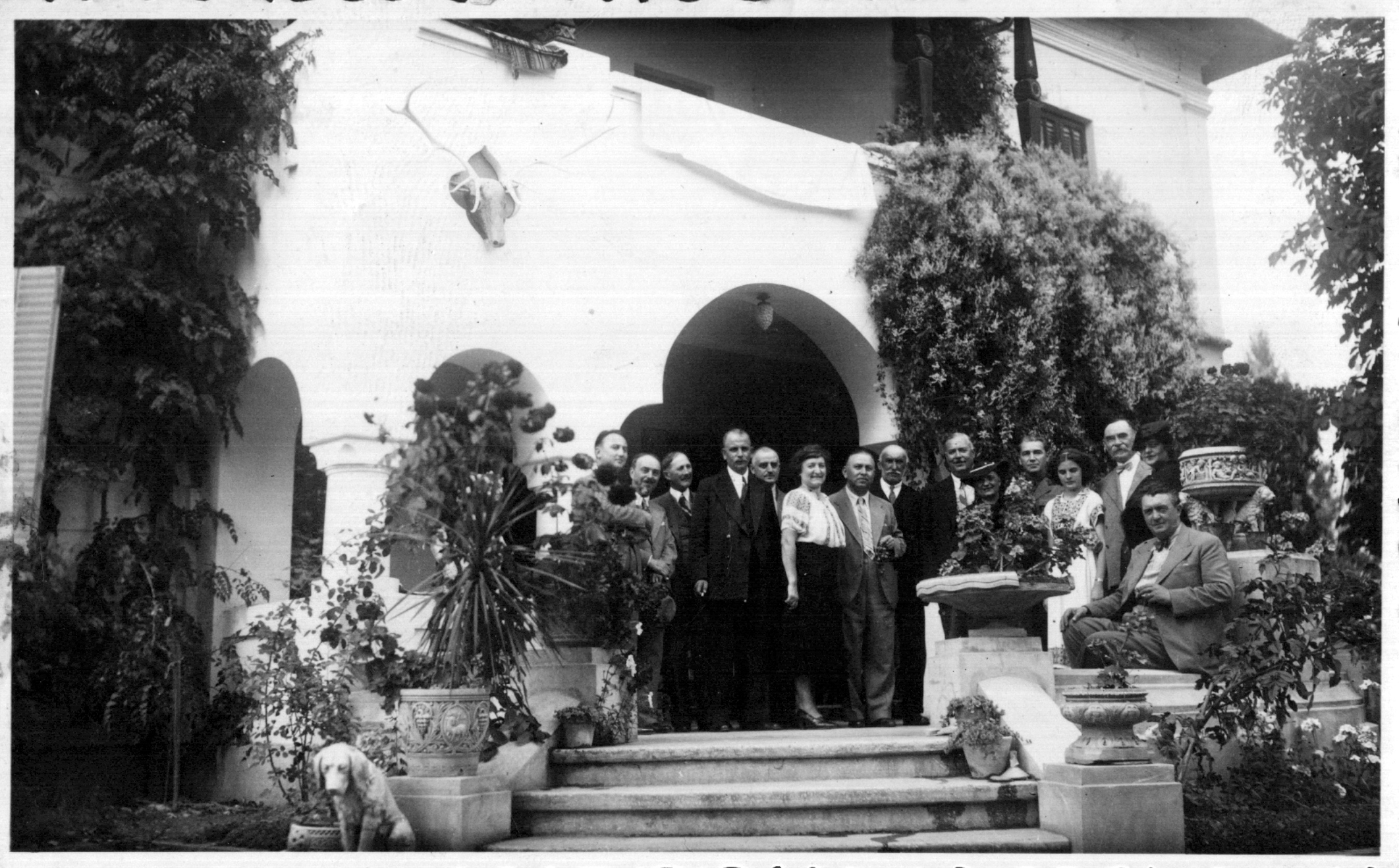
A gathering of friends and family at the manor in Păulești in 1937.

His building in Ploiești, after having suffered severely from the Anglo-American bombings of 1944, was nationalized in 1950, then disfigured by a renovation unrelated to the style of its construction. It was partially restituted, and in a state of advanced degradation, to the family in 2006.

Most of the finest buildings, residences, and structures in Ploiești, including many built by Toma T. Socolescu, his father Toma N. Socolescu, or his uncle Ion N. Socolescu, were destroyed by the communists under the pretext of fragility caused by the 1940 and 1977 earthquakes. Disfigured by a policy of complete demolition, the city has preserved only a very small part of its historic architectural heritage. (Note: Numerous articles and photographs on the site detail the destructions carried out by the communists.)

Starting in 1949, Toma T. Socolescu devoted part of his time to writing his memoirs. The first part of his memoirs, "Amintiri", covers the period from his birth up to 1924. This first part is apparently the only one the architect was ever able to complete. It details his youth, architectural training, as well as the working environment of architects of that era, including travel notes from Transylvania. This period corresponds to the time when the Neo-Romanian architecture style was being developed. In a second chapter, he recounts his travels to Italy, Constantinople, Vienna, and Budapest. (Note: pages 28, 99, 101, 105, and 107.) In 1955, he completed a much more important work: "Fresca Arhitecţilor care au lucrat în România în epoca modernă 1800 - 1925", which became the bibliographic reference for architecture of that period. Both books, Amintiri and Fresca Arhitecţilor care au lucrat în România în epoca modernă 1800 - 1925 were finally published thanks to his family’s initiative in 2004. Finally, he wrote an illustrated monograph about Ion Mincu: Monografia Ioan Mincu, Profesor Arhitect 1851-1912 around 1953–1956. (Note: page 33.) A complete copy of this monograph was gifted by the architect in 1958 to the Ion Mincu University of Architecture and Urbanism. (Note: Of the two volumes given to the Ion Mincu University of Architecture and Urbanism in 1958, an album of 132 photos of Mincu’s works, the second volume of the monograph, mentioned several times in the memoirs including on page 33 (footnote), as well as on the first page of the copy available at the Ion Mincu University library, seems to have mysteriously disappeared from the library’s collection.) (Note: facsimile of the first page of the first volume of the Ion Mincu monograph – page 217.)

The first page of a small booklet he wrote in French in 1941, a translation of the article Principii și îndreptări către o arhitectură românească modernă written in the Arhitectura journal the same year, (Note: (in Romanian) Toma T. Socolescu 1941, pp. 17–18.) includes a summary written solely for his essay published in the bulletin of the Polytechnic School of Bucharest, and which outlines the architect’s credo:

La puissance créatrice de notre peuple est complètement prouvée par son bel art populaire plusieurs fois millénaire ainsi que par l'architecture plus récente de nos églises, habitations princières et voïvodales.
La Création étant le but suprême d'un peuple, c'est par notre apport personnel que nous justifierons notre existence de demain.
En architecture, il ne faut pas à tout prix rechercher le nouveau et nous garder des formules sacro-saintes, comme par exemple: il faut être de son temps. L'architecte ne peut rester en arrière, il a au contraire pour mission d'entraîner ses contemporains dans sa marche vers le progrès.
L'architecture ne peut être internationale, elle doit être conservatrice et suivre évolutivement la chaine des traditions d'un peuple. La construction et la décoration, formant l'une le squelette, l'autre l'enveloppe, doivent se compléter et satisfaire aux deux exigences impérieuses: la logique et le sentiment.
Un grand penseur européen H. Keyserling, croit que notre peuple est appelé à ressusciter l'art byzantin, qui est à la base de notre Église et de notre architecture et que par une reprise de nos traditions d'art, de l'esprit duquel a jailli l'art de notre passé, nous devons diriger nos pas vers une renaissance moderne de nos arts plastiques.

Toma T. Socolescu died on 14 October 1960, in Bucharest, at his son Toma Barbu Socolescu’s home, leaving the second part of his memoirs unfinished (the period after 1924). He is buried in the family Socolescu tomb at the Bellu Cemetery in Bucharest.

== Notable Architectural Works ==
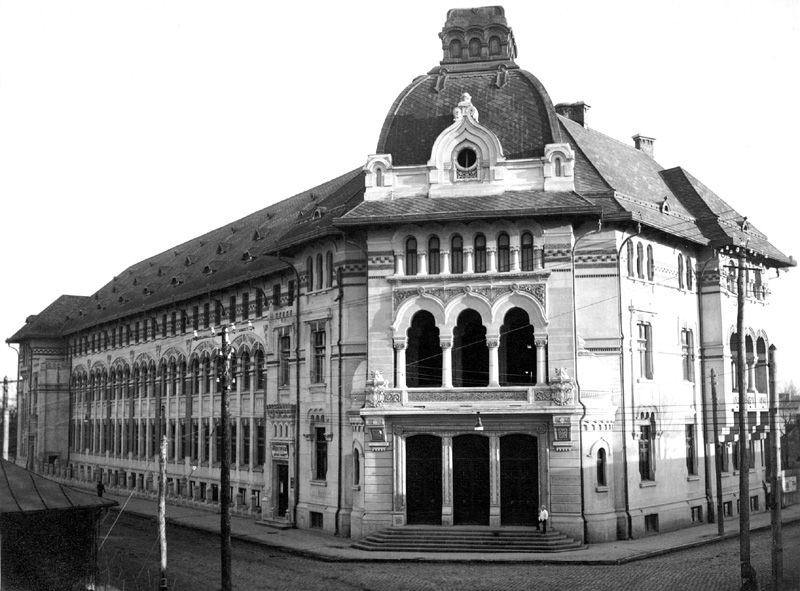
Palace of the Commercial Schools, circa 1938.

=== In Ploiești ===
- Palace of the Commercial Schools, located on calea oilor at the time, now known as strada Gheorghe Doja. The palace is situated at No. 98. (Note: pages 101, 158–161, 197 and 209.) It was built between 1924 and 1938 (Note: pages 158–159 and 204.) thanks to the efforts of successive presidents of the Chamber of Commerce of Ploiești. (Note: page 62.) (Note: page 202.) It was inaugurated in 1938, in the presence of King Carol II. Beginning in 1938, it housed all boys' commercial schools under the name Liceul Comercial Spiru Haret. It ceased its commercial educational activities permanently with the rise of the communist regime in 1948. The building suffered no damage during the 1940 earthquake, nor during the aerial bombings of Ploiești in 1943–1944. Toma T. Socolescu was a member of the city’s civil defense commission and insisted that two red crosses enclosed in circles of 30m be painted on the roof of the building. (Note: page 159.) After hosting various educational institutions following the American bombings of 1944, it now houses the Ion Luca Caragiale National College. It is classified as a historic monument.

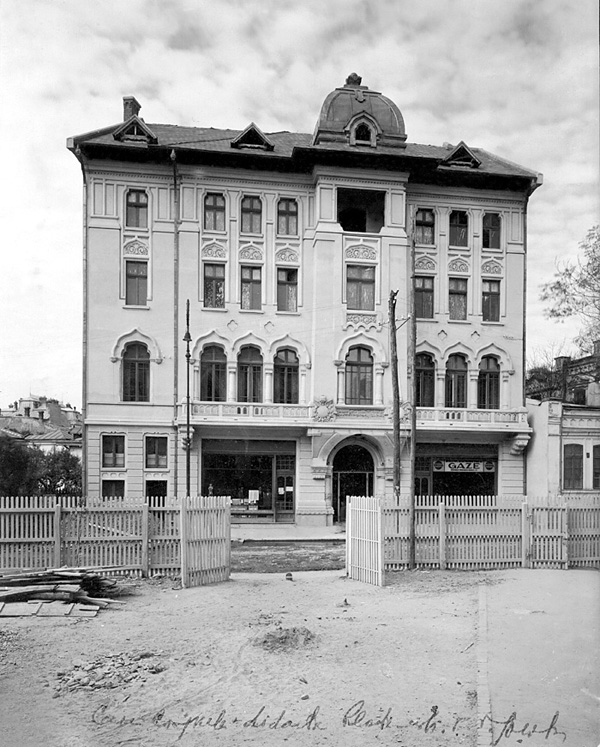
Primary Teaching Staff House of Ploiești, circa 1930.

- Primary Teaching Staff House. The building is located on strada Ștefan cel Mare at No. 8. Construction began in 1925 and was probably completed around 1931. It was inaugurated on 2 October 1932, in the presence of the Minister of Public Instruction, Religion and Arts, Dimitrie Gusti, along with numerous local dignitaries. (Note: page 175.) Although preserved, the building was affected by the earthquakes of 1940 and 1977. Designed with all necessary amenities for teachers and their families, it also included a theater-cinema hall, a bookstore, and a printing press in the basement. (Note: page 61.) (Note: page 201.) It has long since ceased to house the teaching staff. Nationalized by the communist regime in 1948 (the cinematograph Roxi) and in 1962 (the remainder of the building), it was recovered by the County League of Free Education Trade Unions in Prahova in a severely dilapidated condition. By then, most of its contents had been destroyed, removed, or vandalized under the stewardship of the city of Ploiești, which was responsible for the nationalized property from 1962 to 1989. Having changed ownership several times since then, the building has been undergoing major rehabilitation since the summer of 2010, although interspersed with long periods of abandonment. It is classified as a historic monument.
- Central market halls of Ploiești, a major architectural achievement (Note: A detailed architectural and technical description, along with illustrations, can be found on pages 95–101.) (Note: A detailed architectural and technical description, along with illustrations, can be found on pages 597–603.) (Note: pages 101, 108, 135, 144–158, 175, 195, 197–198 and 204.) that left a lasting mark on the city. The contract for the construction of the new halls was signed between the architect and the municipality in 1912 and approved by the municipal council on 9 November 1912, under the presidency of Mayor Scarlat Orăscu. (Note: pages 135 and 147.) The project nearly failed to materialize due to a reversal by Mayor Ion Georgescu Obrocea, who in 1929 improperly awarded the plans and construction to another company, despite the existence of a contract signed in 1913 between the architect and the city. Socolescu challenged this new contract and won the case, notably with the support of his friend and lawyer Grigore Ivănceanu. (Note: pages 71–72.) (Note: page 148.) After a preliminary design was presented to the municipal council in 1913, the project did not officially begin until 1929. (Note: page 149.) Construction began in June 1930 and was completed by the end of 1935. (Note: page 584. The halls were opened on 1 November 1935.) Built in reinforced concrete and based on the most modern principles of hygiene and logistics, the construction gained attention throughout Europe. The project was exhibited at the Bucharest Architecture Salon in both 1930 and 1933. The architect undertook a study tour in Europe, visiting Vienna and Budapest during the winter of 1913, before producing his initial design, followed by three more versions: one at the contract's reinstatement in 1929, and two others during construction. (Note: pages 97–98.) He specifically studied the market halls in Geneva and Basel (Switzerland), Stuttgart, Frankfurt am Main, Leipzig, Munich, and Breslau (Germany); as well as the food departments of major department stores in Berlin, and market halls in Reims, Dieppe, and Lyon (France), the fruit hall in Milan (Italy), and the halls in Budapest (Hungary). In an article published in La Construction moderne in September 1936, Toma T. Socolescu detailed his project, its objectives, layout, and operation. The market halls of Ploiești became a new symbol of the city. Although partially damaged by Anglo-American bombings in 1944, the building was reinforced in 1980. Its original and modern 1930s architecture, combining aesthetics and harmony, was widely recognized across Europe. The entire structure is classified as a Historic Monument. On 27 February 1936, the architect also submitted a design for a wholesale market hall, which was never realized. (Note: pages 148 and 205.) (Note: History and plans on pages 160–161.)

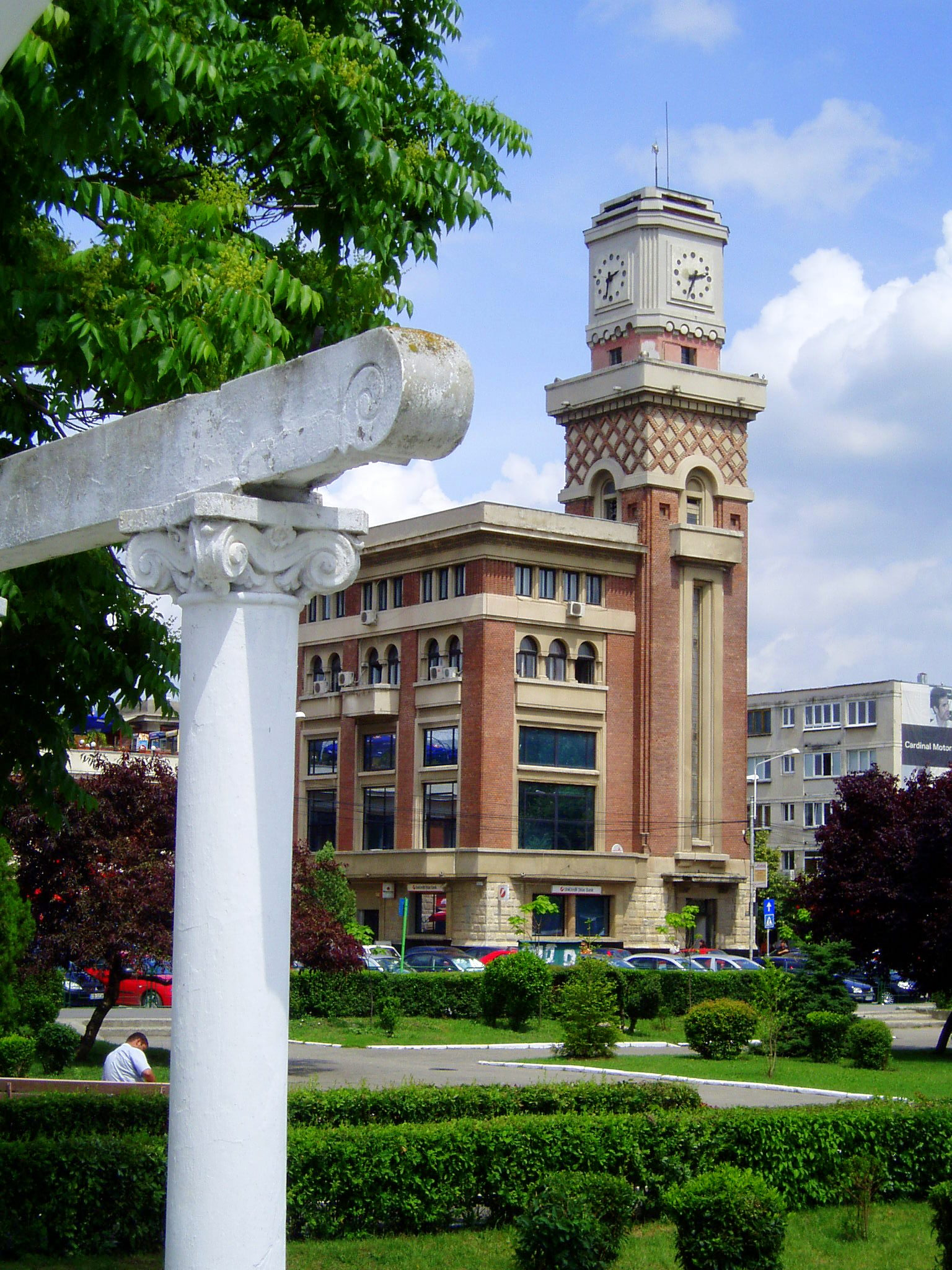

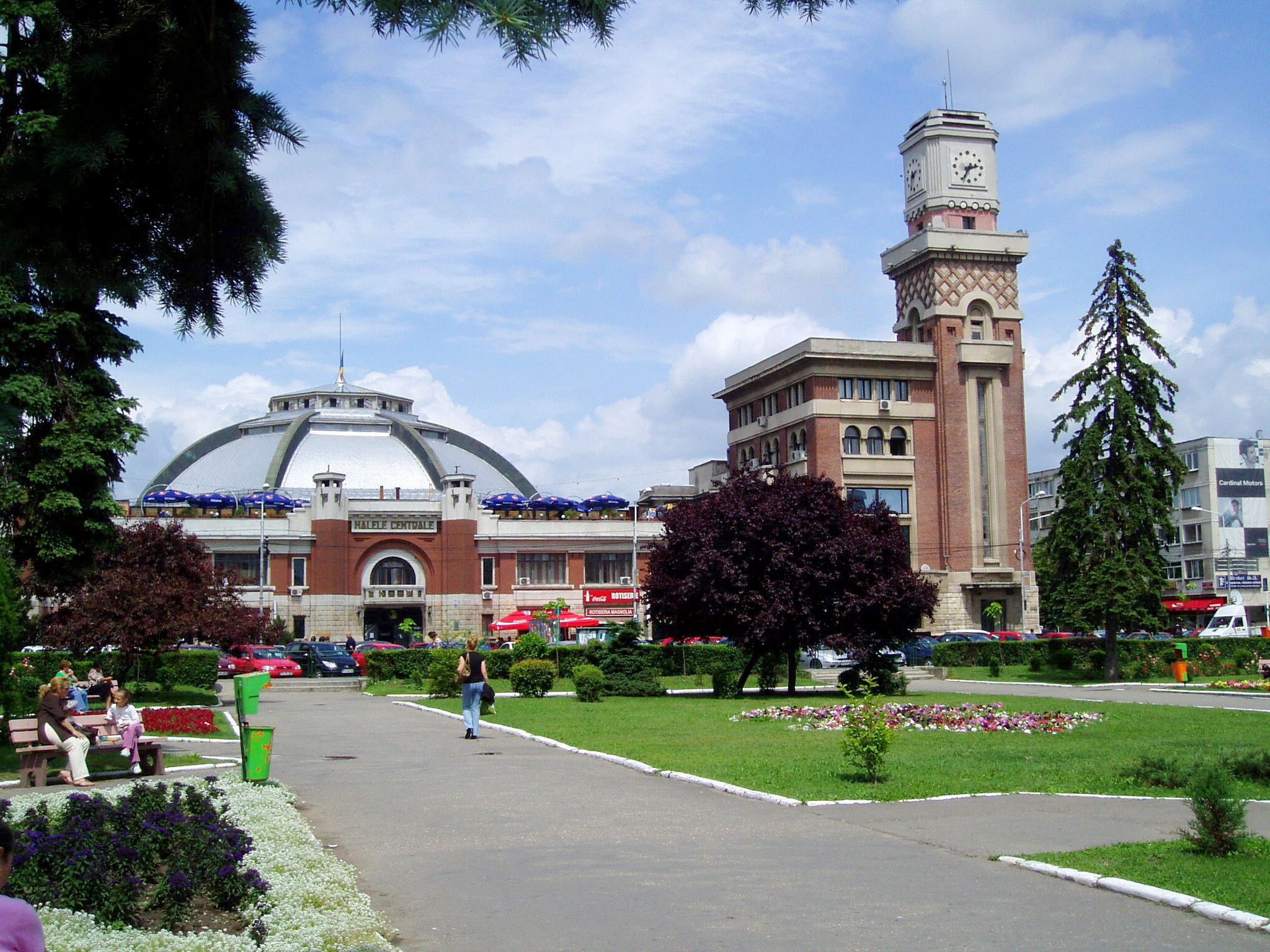

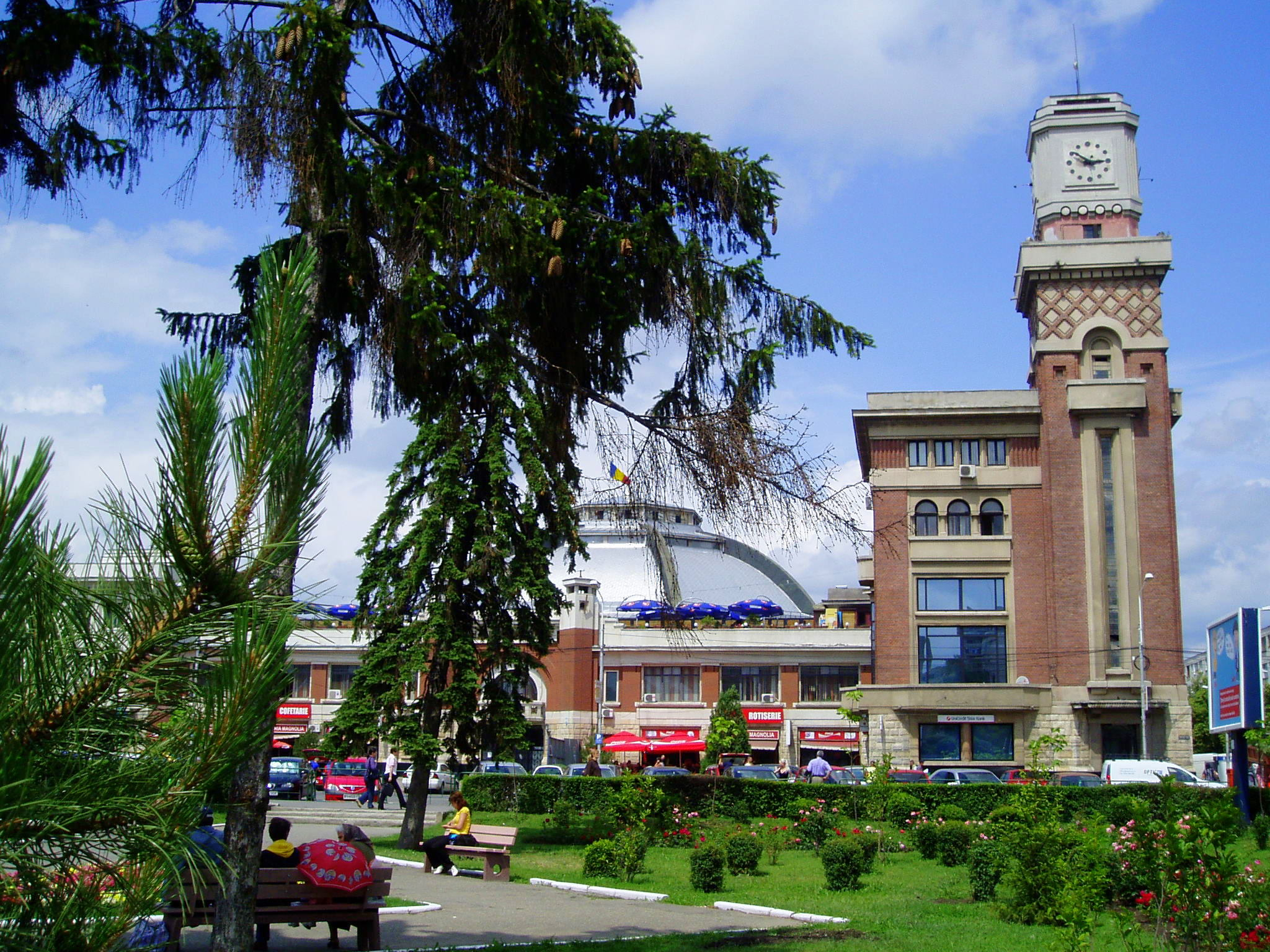

The Central Market Halls

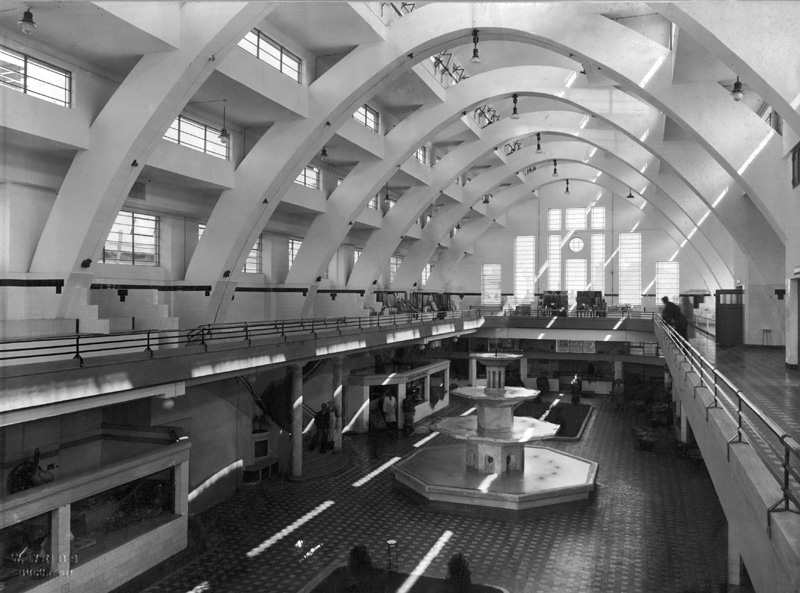

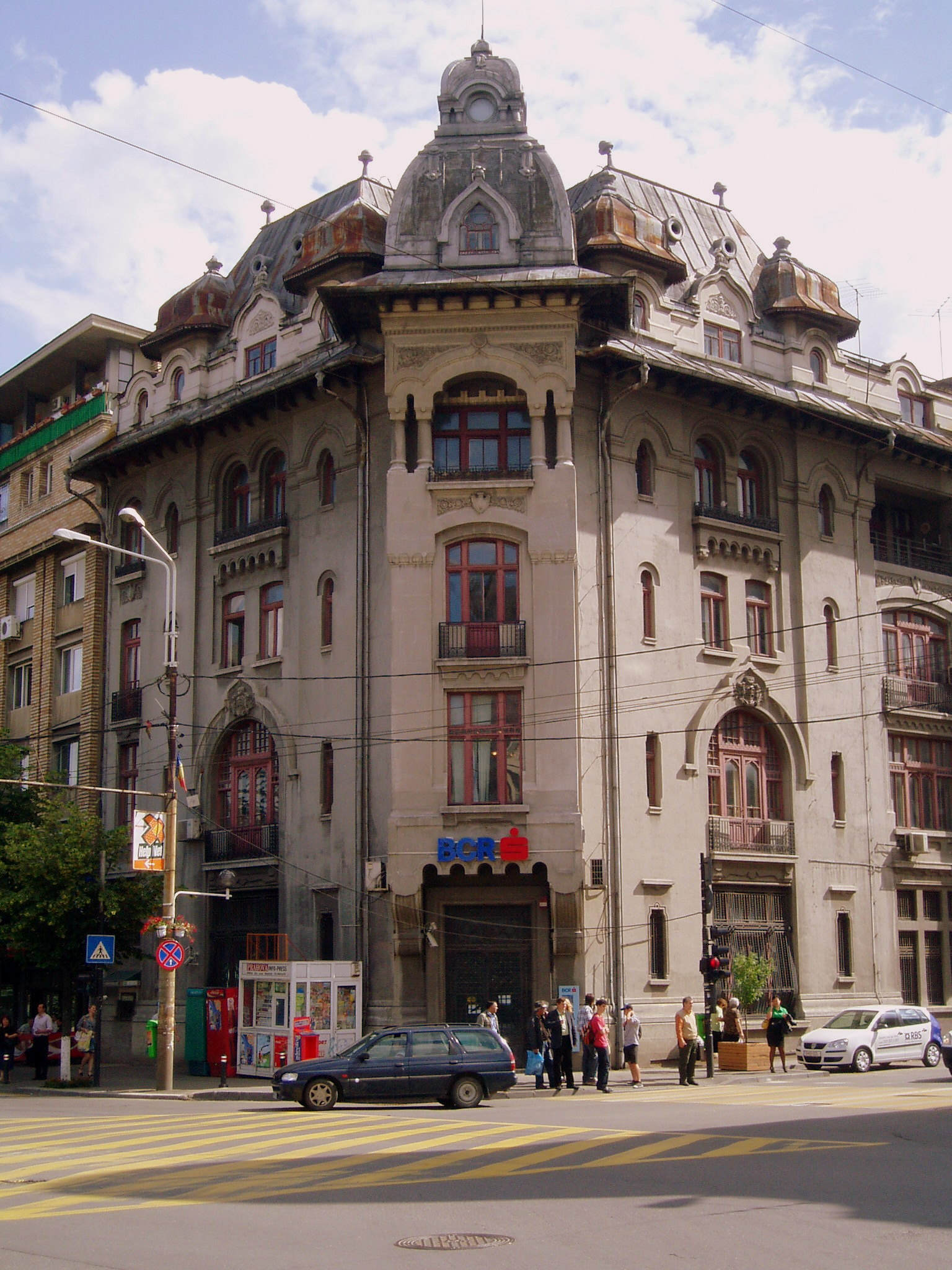
The former Creditul Prahovei.

- Creditul Prahovei, located at the intersection of bulevard Republicii and strada Take Ionescu, across from what was once the central square of the city: Piață Unirii. (Note: The old Ploiești and the location of the 'Union Square' (Piață Unirii): see the pages Grădina publică, Hora Țărănească, De la Calea Câmpinii la Bulevardul Republicii, Bulevardul Independenței, as well as the article comparing the center of Ploiești in the 1930s with its appearance today (2025, unchanged since 2009): Lucian Vasile (historian) (23 November 2011). "Grădina publică" [The Public Garden]. republicaploiesti.net (Republica Ploiești – Povești despre vechiul Ploiești) (in Romanian). "History and photographs of Ploiești's public garden"; Lucian Vasile (historian) (16 June 2011). "Hora Țărănească" [Peasant Dance]. republicaploiesti.net (Republica Ploiești – Povești despre vechiul Ploiești) (in Romanian). "History and photographs of the Hora țărănească store"; Lucian Vasile (historian) (31 October 2009). "De la Calea Câmpinii la Bulevardul Republicii" [From the Câmpina Road to Republic Boulevard]. republicaploiesti.net (Republica Ploiești – Povești despre vechiul Ploiești) (in Romanian). "History and photographs of Câmpina Road, later Republic Boulevard"; Lucian Vasile (historian) (20 March 2011). "Bulevardul Independenței" [Independence Boulevard]. republicaploiesti.net (Republica Ploiești – Povești despre vechiul Ploiești) (in Romanian).; Lucian Vasile (historian) (16 August 2009). "Centrul Ploieștiului – comparație: anii '30 vs. azi" [Downtown Ploiești – Comparison: the 1930s vs. today]. republicaploiesti.net (Republica Ploiești – Povești despre vechiul Ploiești) (in Romanian).) Later known as the Banca Românească, the building was occupied from the 1990s until the late 2010s by the Banca Comercială Română or BCR, and is currently unoccupied. The project was designed around 1923 and likely completed in 1926, with the inauguration taking place on 1 January 1927. Photographs and architectural plans of the bank were published in the journal Arhitectura in 1926. The building is classified as a Historic Monument.
- Saint John the Baptist Cathedral of Ploiești. In 1912, the architect had already worked on the old Saint John the Baptist Church. According to his plans, the main dome was raised by 5 meters}. (Note: page 752.) The structure consists of reinforced concrete frames, with brick masonry walls and turrets. The structural engineering and execution of the monument were carried out by engineer Emil Prager.

Constructed between 1923 (Note: page 751. Prince Carol II laid the foundation stone on 18 November 1923.) and 1939, (Note: pages 149, 175, 178, 183–185, 198 and 204.) the cathedral was intended to honor the fallen of the First World War and reflects a broader national-religious impulse. The bell tower is classified as a Historic Monument.

Only the tower (a 60 meters high bell tower) and the first part of the structure were completed, (Note: pages 12–13.) (Note: pages 152–153, 751–752.) with construction halted by the outbreak of the Second World War. The larger project—intended to replace the existing church with a more monumental building—was never realized. Work resumed in 2008, inspired by the original plans of Toma T. Socolescu.

The façade was particularly innovative for its time, and two monumental statues sculpted by Emil Wilhelm Becker flank the entrance. The interior furnishings are remarkably crafted. Preliminary designs and architectural plans for the cathedral were published in the 1924 and 1925 issues of the journal Arhitectura. (Note: Toma T. Socolescu, Catedrală monument "Sf. Ioan" a eroilor Prahovei, drawing dated 1923, 1924, year III, page 144.; Toma T. Socolescu, Catedrală Ortodoxă, Ante-proiect, drawings, 1925, year IV, pages 73–74.) In 1960, the communist authorities sought to disrupt the harmony of the site and reduce the visibility of the bell tower by constructing a massive, grey, styleless seven-storey block in front of it. (Note: page 149, note 159.)

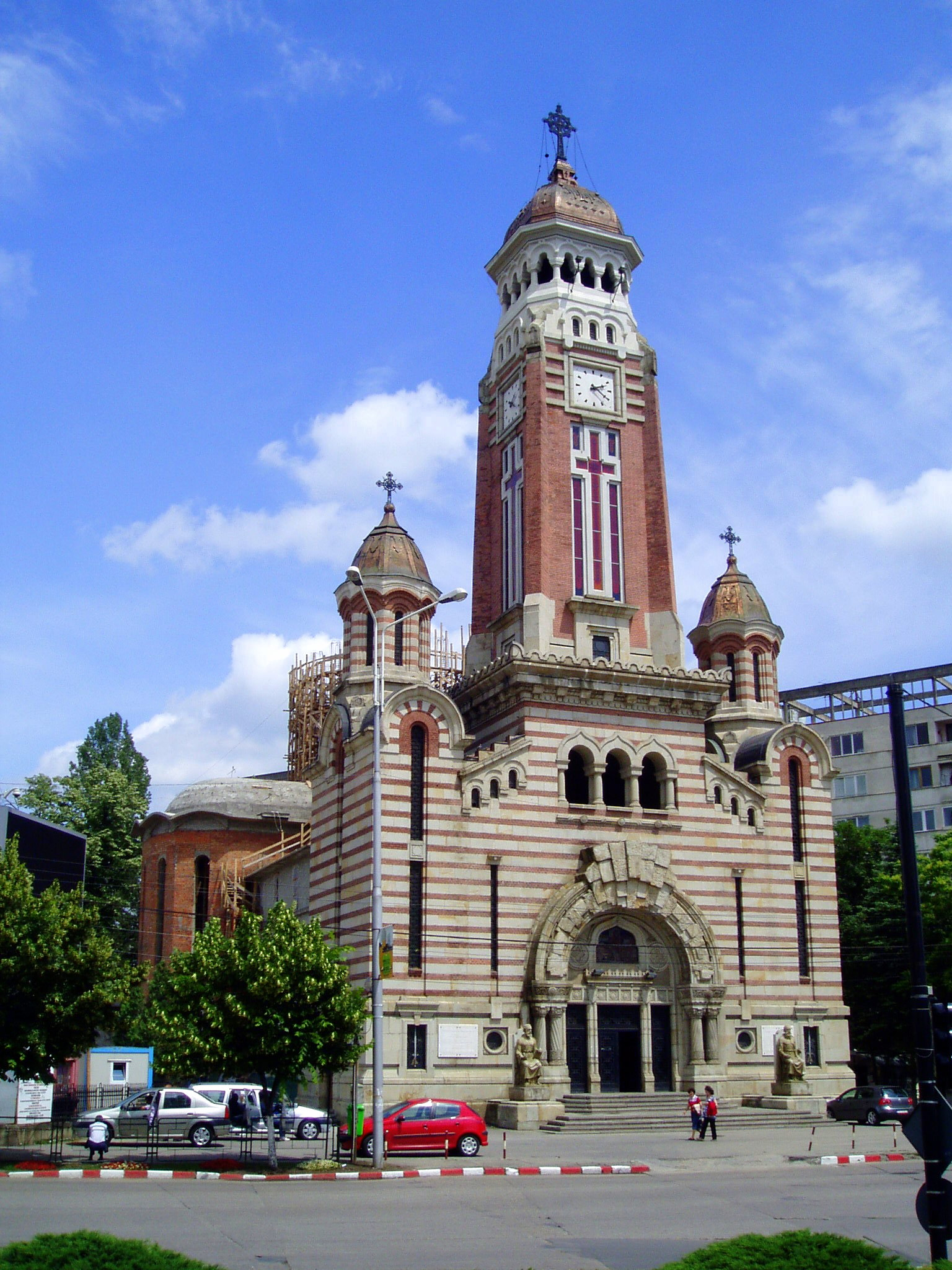
Saint John the Baptist Cathedral.

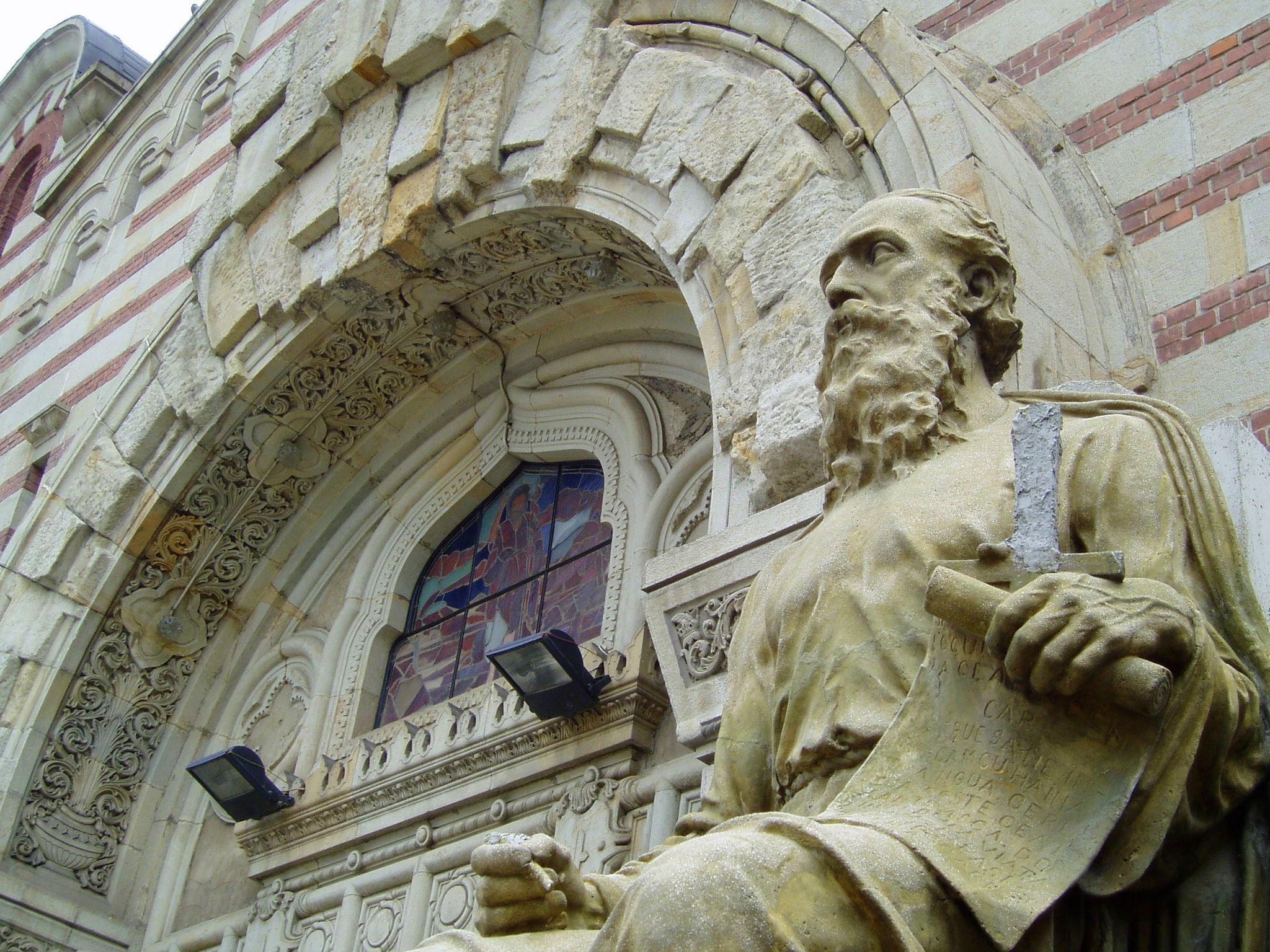
Monumental entrance to Saint John the Baptist Cathedral.

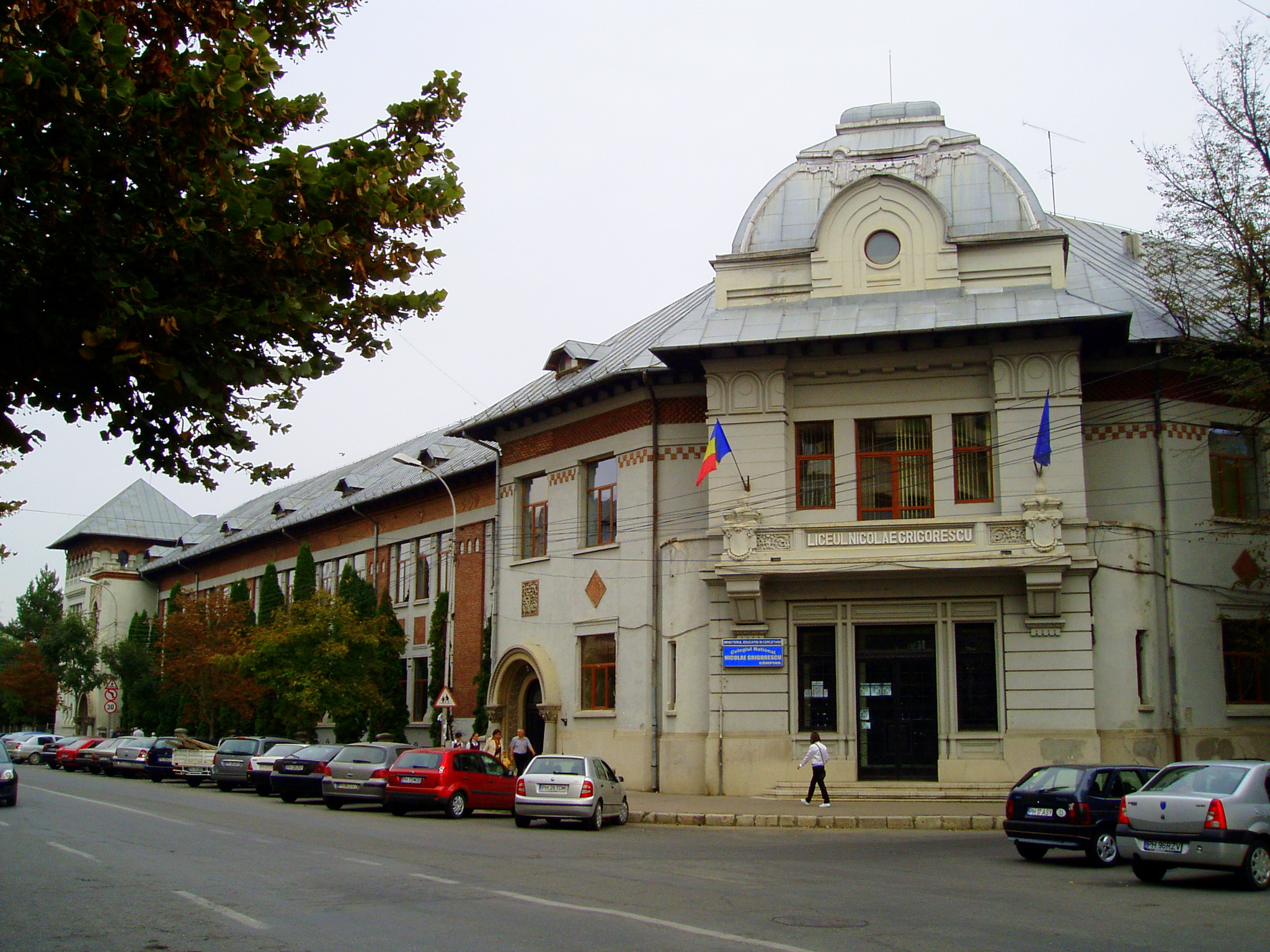
Boys' High School of Câmpina.

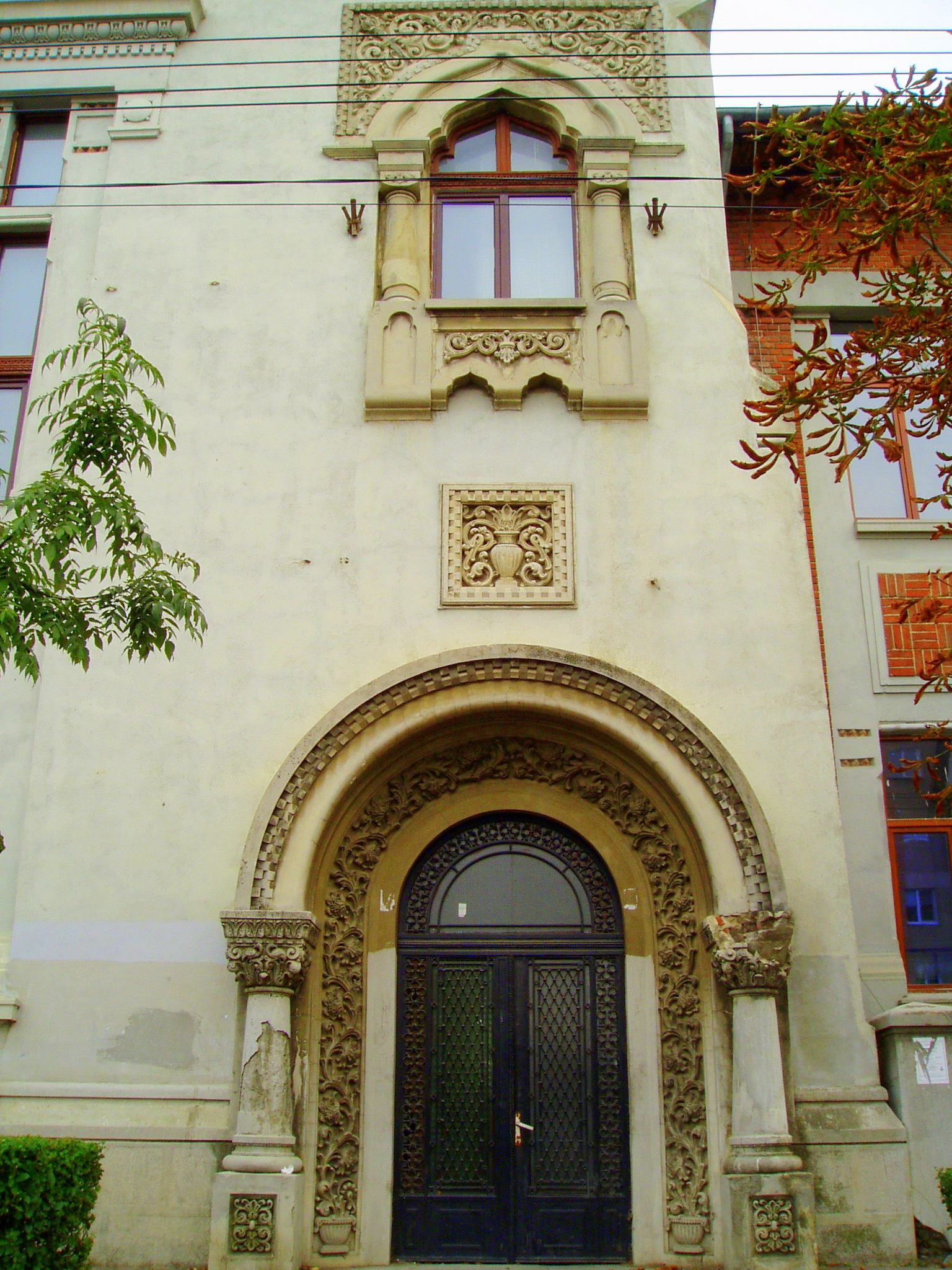
Façade of the Boys' High School of Câmpina.

Notable works by Toma T. Socolescu.

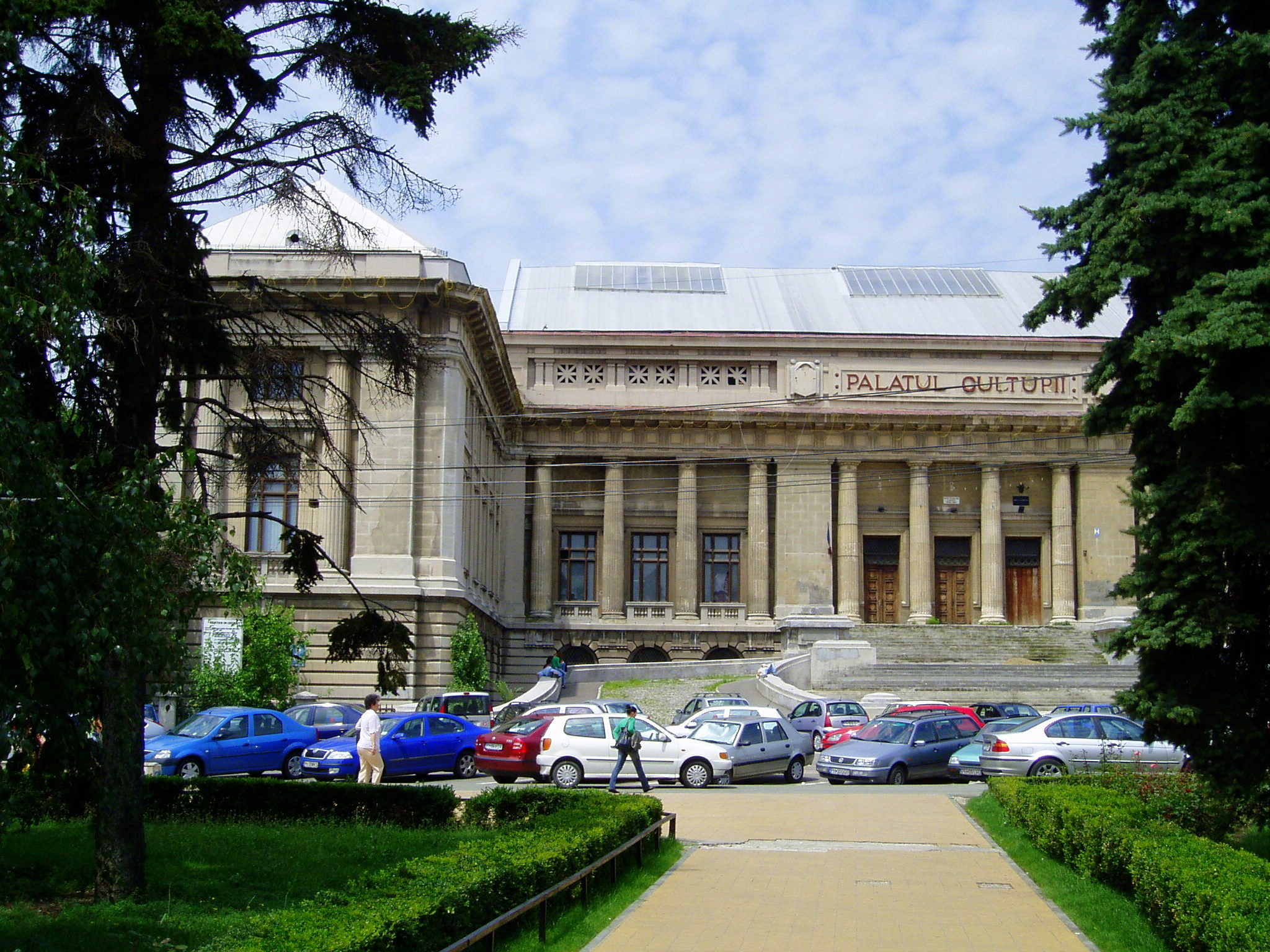
The Palace of Justice, now Palace of Culture.

- The Palace of Justice of Ploiești, in collaboration with French architect Ernest Doneaud. The first project was drafted and construction begun before the war, under the authority of Prefect Luca Elefterescu. Toma T. Socolescu was appointed "chief architect", in charge of the entire construction site from 1923 until completion in 1932. (Note: pages 101, 168–169, 172, 175 and 204.) The Palace was inaugurated on 26 November 1933, in the presence of King Carol II. In 1953, the building was repurposed as the Palace of Culture, while still housing the Court of Appeal. Damaged by the Anglo-American bombings of 1944 and the March 4, 1977 earthquake, it was structurally reinforced during the 1980s. Restoration, structural consolidation, and renovation efforts have been ongoing since 2006 and remain unfinished to this day. Published in the journal Arhitectura in 1924, (Note: Ernest Doneaud, Palatul Justiției din Ploești, drawing, 1924, year III, page 74.) the building is listed as a historic monument.

=== In Prahova county ===
- Boys' High School Dimitrie Barbu Știrbey in Câmpina, located at No. 4 calea Doftanei. (Note: pages 158–159, 162–163, 166, 197 and 204.) The plans were approved by the Ministry of Education in 1926. The central section, along with the wing facing Calea Doftanei, was built between 1928 and 1929. The second wing, opening onto strada Mihai Eminescu, along with the Carrara marble staircase, interior marble decorations, carved oak doors in the main hall, and the exterior wrought iron gates, were completed between 1932 and 1942. Damaged by the 1940 earthquake, and severely hit during the Anglo-American bombings of 1944 (the Mihai Eminescu wing and the gymnasium were destroyed), the school was partially reopened shortly after. The destroyed wing was rebuilt in 1957–1958. However, the March 4, 1977 earthquake rendered the building unusable, necessitating a reconstruction with a new reinforced concrete structure. (Note: page 166.) Despite all these major interventions, the building has retained both its architectural style and visual harmony. It now houses the Nicolae Grigorescu National College, formerly known as Liceul Dimitrie Barbu Știrbey since 1933.

== Other Works Completed (Non-Exhaustive List) ==
=== In Ploiești ===
==== Houses, villas, and apartment buildings ====
- Villa of pharmacist N. Hogaș, brother of the writer Calistrat Hogaș. During its construction, (Note: pages 112, 134 and 203.) the architect reserved the ceiling of the salon for the painter Toma Gheorghe Tomescu to create a fresco. (Note: page 86.) (Note: page 812.) Built in 1907, it was destroyed during the anglo-american bombings of 1944. It was the first project completed by Toma T. Socolescu.
- Pasapeanu House, (Note: page 43, the architect wrote in his memoirs in the late 1950s that it still existed.) a small house built for a postal worker, on strada I. Romanescu, constructed in 1908–1909. The street is now called strada Barbu Delavrancea. It is the smallest known work by the architect.
- House of the schoolteacher Aldescu, located at No. 31 strada Vlad Țepeș., built in 1908–1909. It is still clearly visible today. (Note: page 54.)
- House of priest Zotu, located on calea București, now called calea Democrației, near the South Railway Station, built around 1908–1909. (Note: pages 134 and 203) It was expropriated and later demolished by the communists to make way for the 1st May factories.
- Apartment building of the Alessiu brothers, (Note: page 60.) (Note: page 200.) likely built around 1910, at the beginning of strada Lipscani, which was razed by the communists. Strada Lipscani was a slightly curved street running from the city center to the Palace of Justice. The street disappeared in two stages: the first half near the Palace of Culture was demolished between 1968–1969 to make way for the current administrative complex. The other half was demolished after the 1977 earthquake.
- Residential house of Orăscu, located at No. 18 bulevard Independenței. (Note: pages 39–40.) (Note: pages 179–180.) Scarlat Orăscu was one of the most important mayors of Ploiești between 1911 and 1914, later serving twice as senator. (Note: pages 179, 422, 433–434.) Built around 1911–1913 (Note: page 110.) (Note: pages 111–114, 135 and 203) in the French Art Nouveau style, fashionable at the time. Its interior was luxurious. The house was confiscated by the communists and turned into a workers' canteen, (Note: page 46.) and later into a children's polyclinic (still functioning as of 2024). The building is listed as a historic monument.

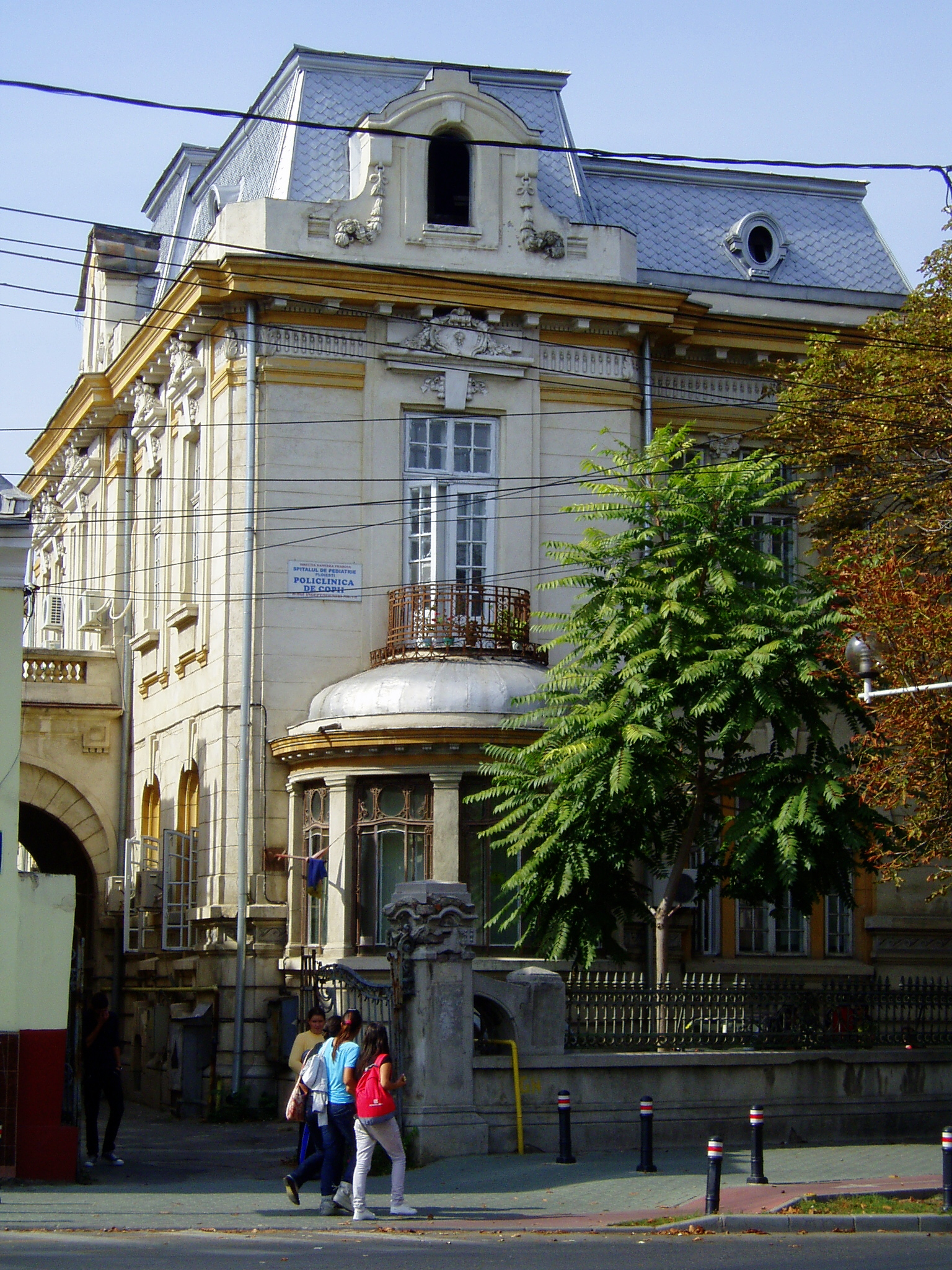
House of Scarlat Orăscu

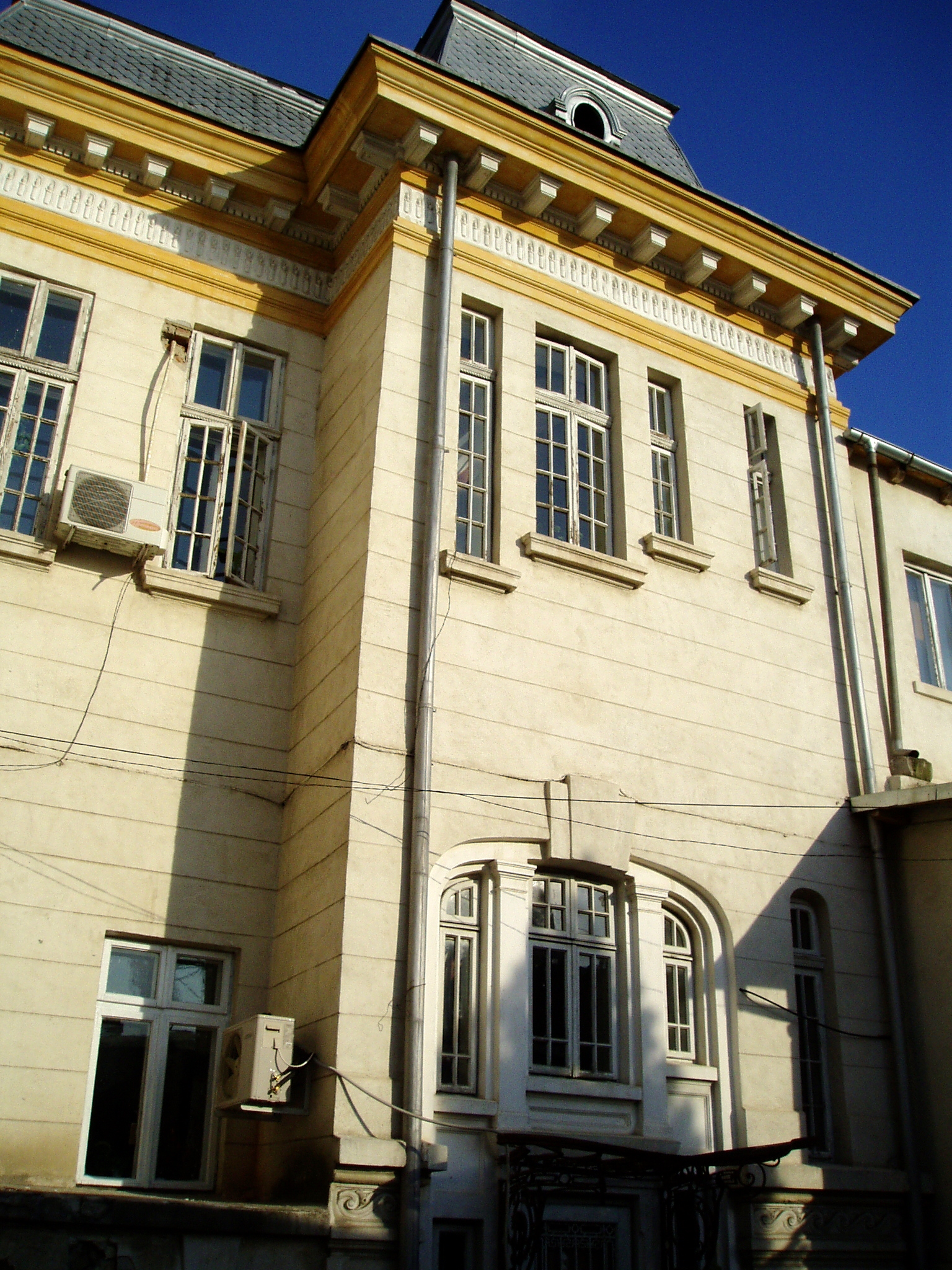
House of Scarlat Orăscu

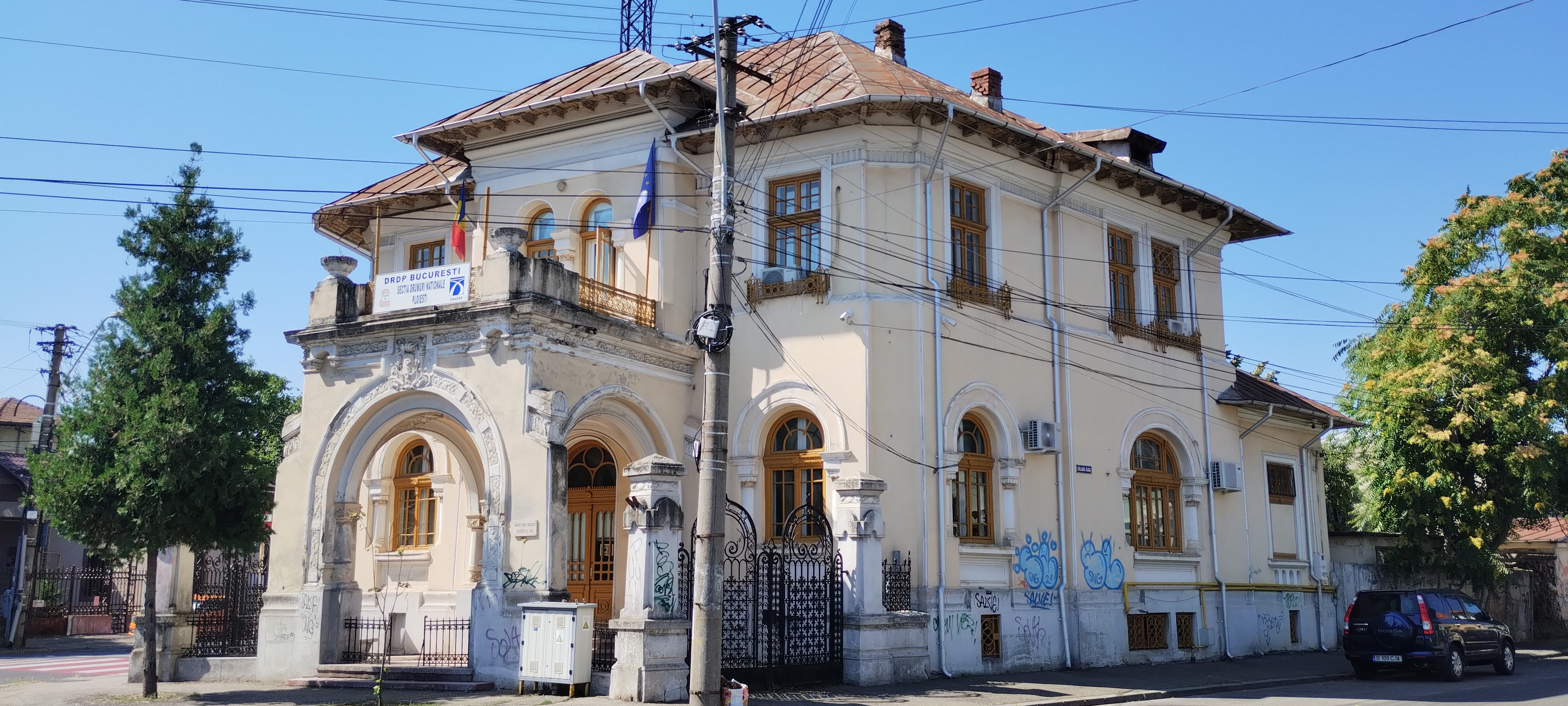
Villa of Dr. L. Fridman.

Houses of Scarlat Orăscu and Dr. L Fridman.

- Rental property known as G. Gogălniceanu or Hora țărănească, located on Piața Unirii, designed by Ion N. Socolescu and Toma T. Socolescu, (Note: pages 57 and 59) (Note: pages 197 and 199) between 1914 and 1916. (Note: pages 28–29, 52, 58, and 203) The building was heavily damaged during the anglo-american bombings of 1944, and its remaining structure was demolished during the 1958 systematization campaign. The original Union Square (Piața Unirii) was also erased from the cityscape during the massive urban restructuring under the communist regime. Even its name was not retained, despite the square being the historic heart of the city and its commercial center, alongside strada Lipscani, which was also completely obliterated. A small street named strada Unirii still exists nearby, but it is lifeless and hidden behind a massive Soviet-style concrete building known as the "administrative palace," constructed after 1965. Since this major urban overhaul, Ploiești has lacked a true city center. After the fall of communism, the urban structure imposed by the former regime proved unsustainable, and the city has struggled to regenerate or establish a vibrant downtown. As of June 2025, the area that once formed Union Square is gray, deteriorated, largely deserted after dusk, and marked by urban neglect. Businesses are limited to a McDonald's, a dozen Turkish-style fast food outlets or pastry takeaways, a multitude of political party offices, empty, very rarely visited, and which occupy considerable space, two pharmacies, three mobile phone shops, a pole dancing club, and numerous adult gaming parlors that have proliferated in the last decade. A handful of other establishments, including two or three cafés and a dusty bookshop, manage to survive in a district increasingly populated by the homeless and virtually abandoned by Saturday afternoon.

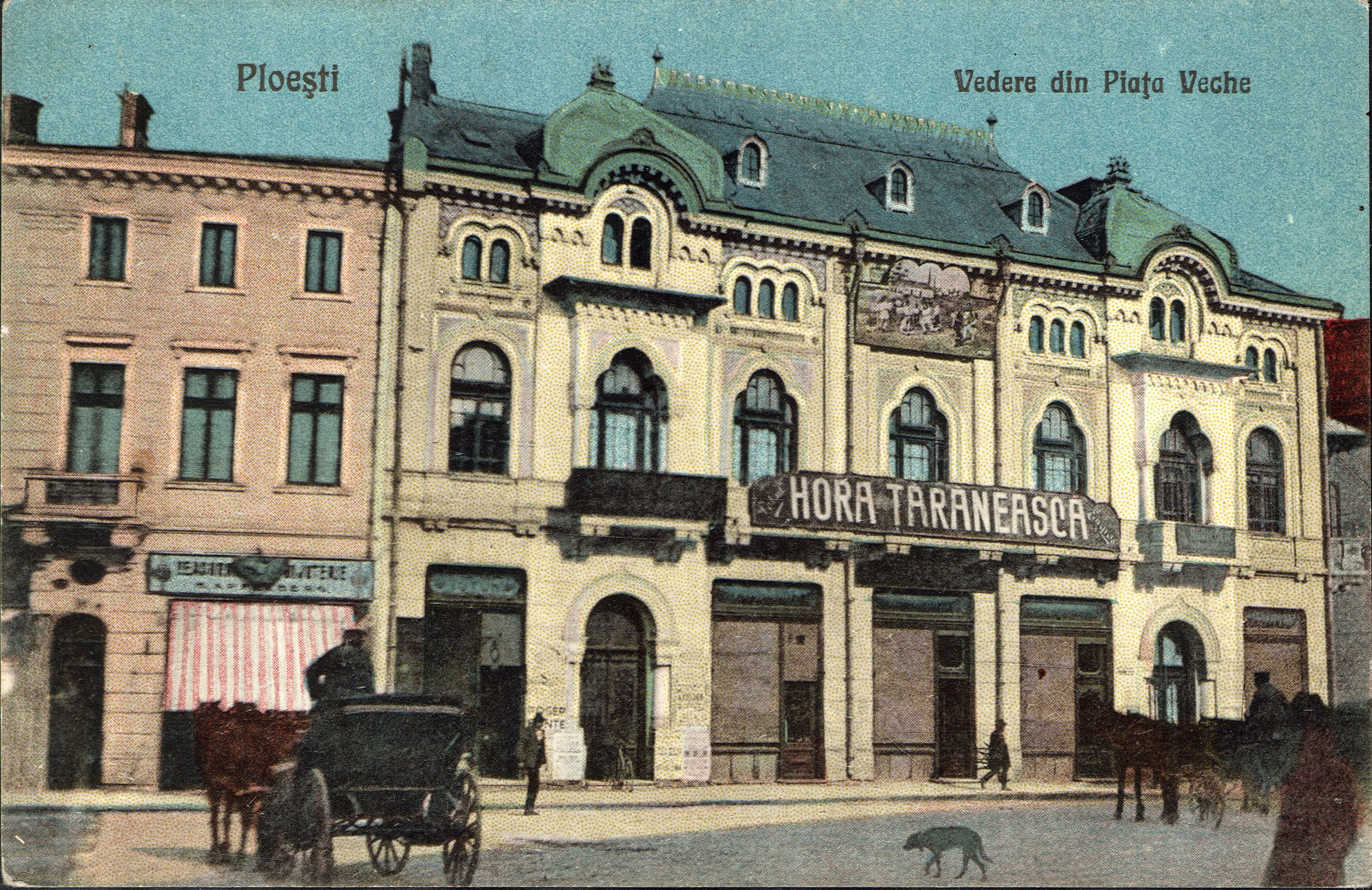
Hora țărănească in Ploiești

- B. Nasopol house, strada Ștefan cel Mare, built between 1913 and 1915, (Note: pages 112-113 and 203.) destroyed by the 1944 American bombings according to the "Memoirs" of Socolescu. Located at No. 12 on strada Ștefan cel Mare, it housed the County Technical Services in 1938. However, at this address there exists an old house fairly well preserved both outside and inside, perfectly matching, for its ground floor part, the style of the architect. The house, initially without a floor, would have been raised by one floor during the communist era.

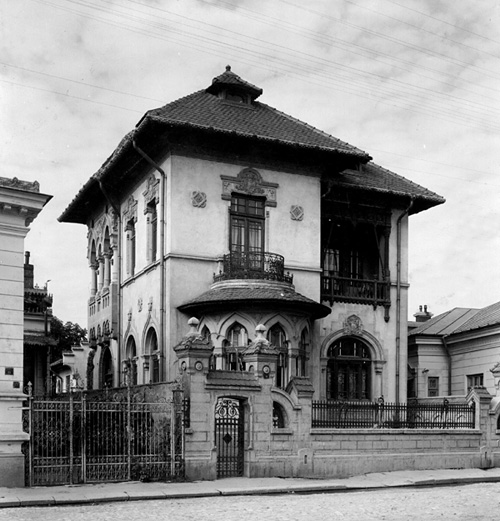
Villa Zaharia Leon.

- Zaharia Leon villa on strada Drosescu. Its construction was carried out around 1913-1915. (Note: pages 112-113, 119, 135 and 203.) The villa was razed by the 1944 anglo-american bombings. strada Drosescu was renamed strada C. T. Grigorescu. The new house that replaced it at number No. 13 partially preserved the original walls and fence gates.
- Villa of Dr. L. Fridman (Note: pages 112-113, 116-117, 135 and 203.) formerly at the intersection of strada Iennescu and strada Aurel Vlaicu, its address is now strada Maramureș, No. 8 Built around 1913-1915, it was nationalized, by the communists. The residence is classified as a historic monument and currently houses the National Department of Bridges and Roads (National Company for Road Infrastructure Administration). In 2025, the façade of this historic monument is beginning to seriously deteriorate.
- Toma T. Socolescu's rental building at No. 2 on strada Ștefan cel Mare, formerly strada Regina Maria. Built from 1914 onwards, the building was suitable for habitation by 1915 and probably completed after World War I. (Note: pages 60-61.) (Note: pages 131, 133-134 and 203.) The architect heavily indebted himself to banks to build it. He installed his office there and worked until the American bombing partially destroyed it in 1944. (Note: pages 50-51.) The building was deeply transformed and disfigured by the Russians in the 1950s, after its confiscation by the State. The remarkable original façade no longer exists and was replaced by a much more sober style. Originally, the building had 7 shops on the ground floor and 5 apartments including that of the architect and his family. (Note: page 51.)

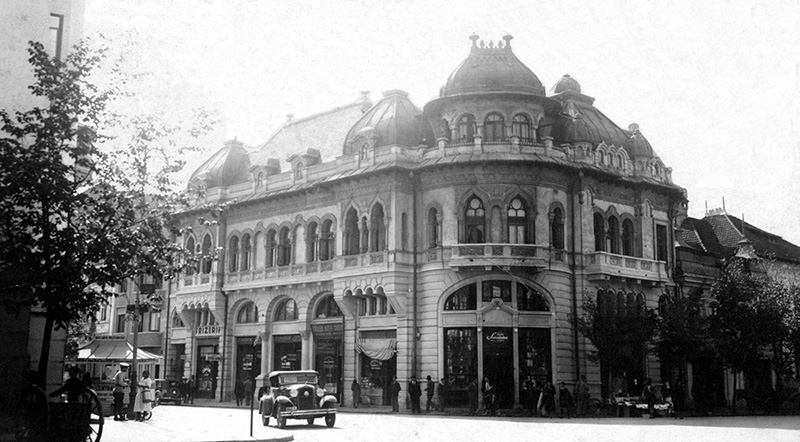
Socolescu building in Ploiești.

- Rental building of D. Pârvulescu (Note: pages 61-62.) (Note: pages 201-202.) in the former market (Obor), at No. 1 on strada Émile Zola. Built in 1928, (Note: pages 131-132, 134 and 204.) (Note: Historical background and photographs pages 83-86.) it was nationalized in 1950. The Pârvulescu family fought from 1996 to 2002 to regain rights to the building, even forced to repurchase an apartment abusively resold by the state in 1973. (Note: pages 332-333) The block of buildings where it is located escaped communist destruction.
- House of M. Obrien, strada Eminescu. Built after World War I, (Note: pages 119 and 204.) and before 1937, it was destroyed by the 1944 anglo-american bombings.
- Rental building Gheorghe Bogdan, probably built in 1922 as attested by an inscription in the entrance hall, located at 36 strada Mihai Kogălniceanu (former strada Franceză). After being nationalized, the building was only partially recovered by the Bogdan heirs, who managed to reclaim only the commercial spaces on the ground floor. The house is one of the few remains of a very old and typical neighborhood in the city center of Ploiești, totally razed and rebuilt between 1960 and 1989, without any architectural style, with only concerns being the uniformization of housing, densification of urban space, the social rapprochement city-countryside and the erasure of the past. The city still owns several apartments that are used as social housing. The building, which would have deserved to be listed as a historical monument, has been deteriorating over time, without any response from the successive mayors so far.

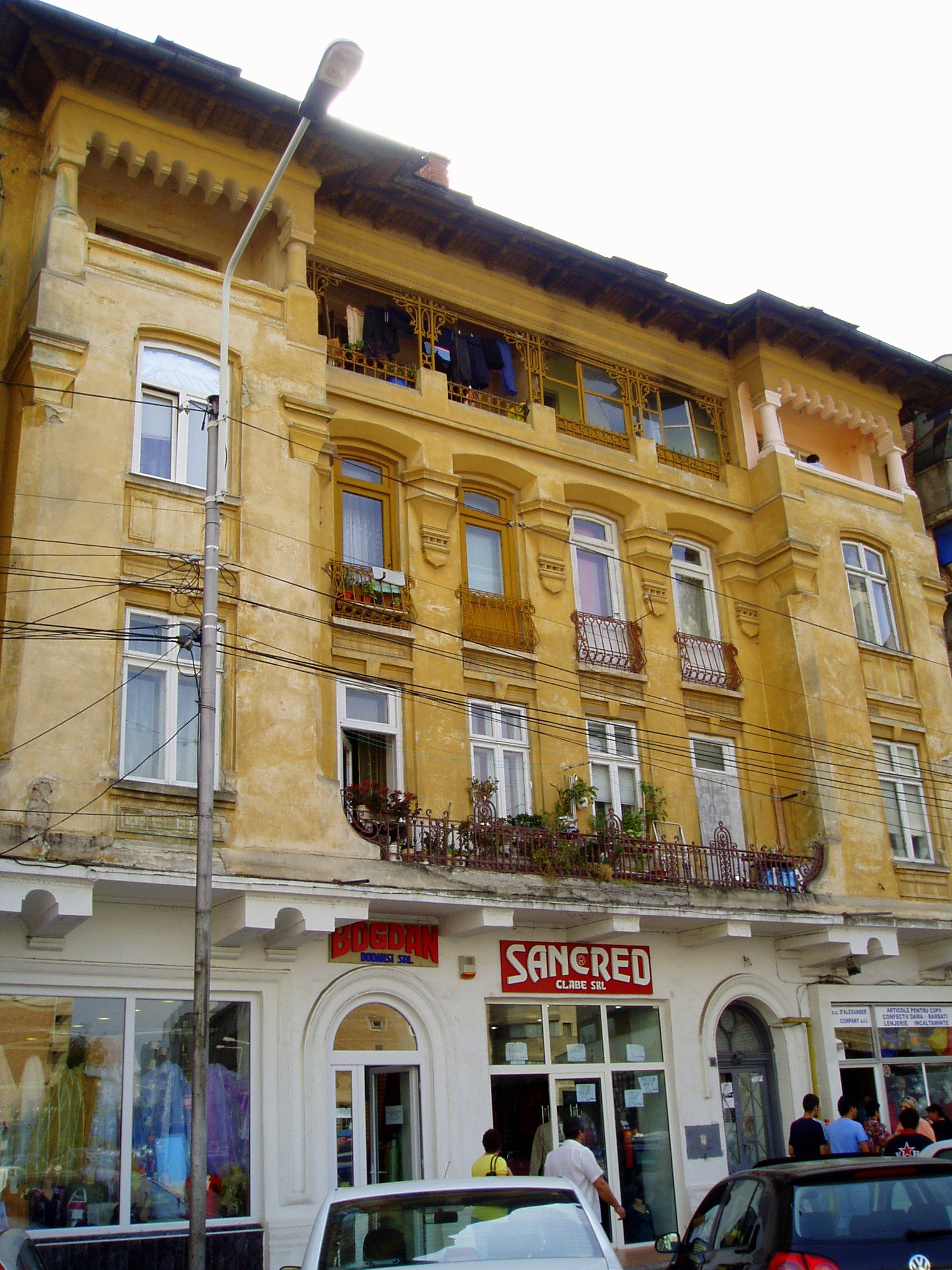
Gheorghe Bogdan building.

- Rental building Toboc at No. 1 on strada Democrației. The building was designed and built by Toma T. Socolescu. Its style strongly recalls the brâncovenesc stylistic orientation of the architect. Furthermore, the building closely resembles the rental building that he had constructed a few years earlier at No. 2 on strada Ștefan cel Mare. Built between 1920 and 1924 (Note: pages 131-132, 133, 138 and 204.) for the printer Dumitru Buta, nicknamed Toboc (or stocky in Romanian), the building was nationalized in 1950. In 1977, the building was severely damaged by the earthquake and insufficient and incomplete repairs were subsequently carried out. Despite the authorities's evacuation request, tenants who had lived there until then refused to leave, so the block’s deterioration continued gradually due to lack of consolidation works. The building was subject to a restitution procedure but the heir chose financial compensation rather than in-kind restitution, which would have forced her to keep the tenants and carry out enormous consolidation work that the communists had carefully avoided. Thus, the city remained owner of this remarkable but very degraded building. The construction is classified as a building at high seismic risk (level 2). Despite its obvious architectural interest, the good general preservation of its façades, its roof and the rare preservation of its original windows, the building is neither classified as a historic monument (a procedure which depends only on the city’s initiative, which has not found it necessary to do so for over thirty years), nor the subject of any rehabilitation project by the city hall.

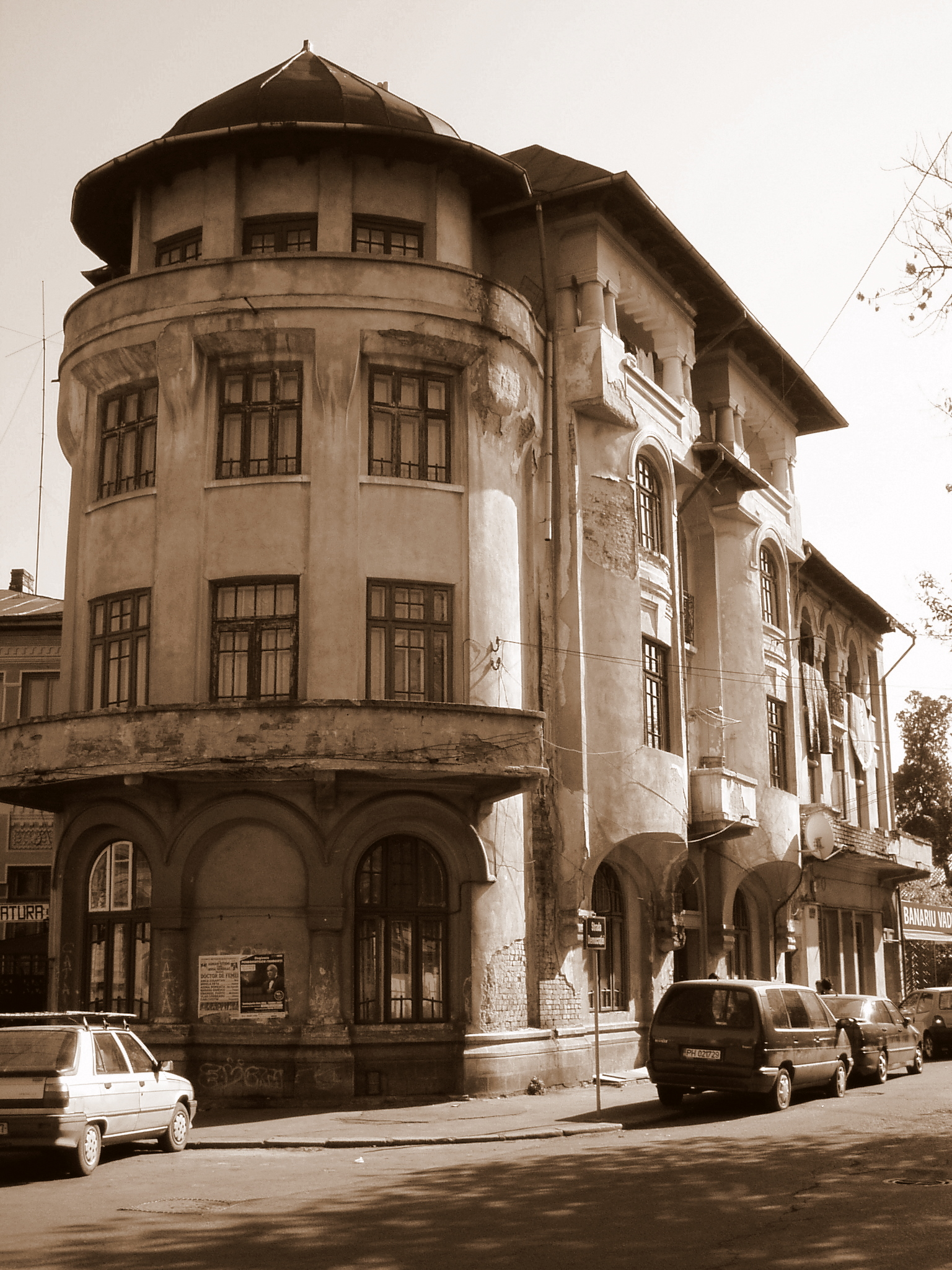

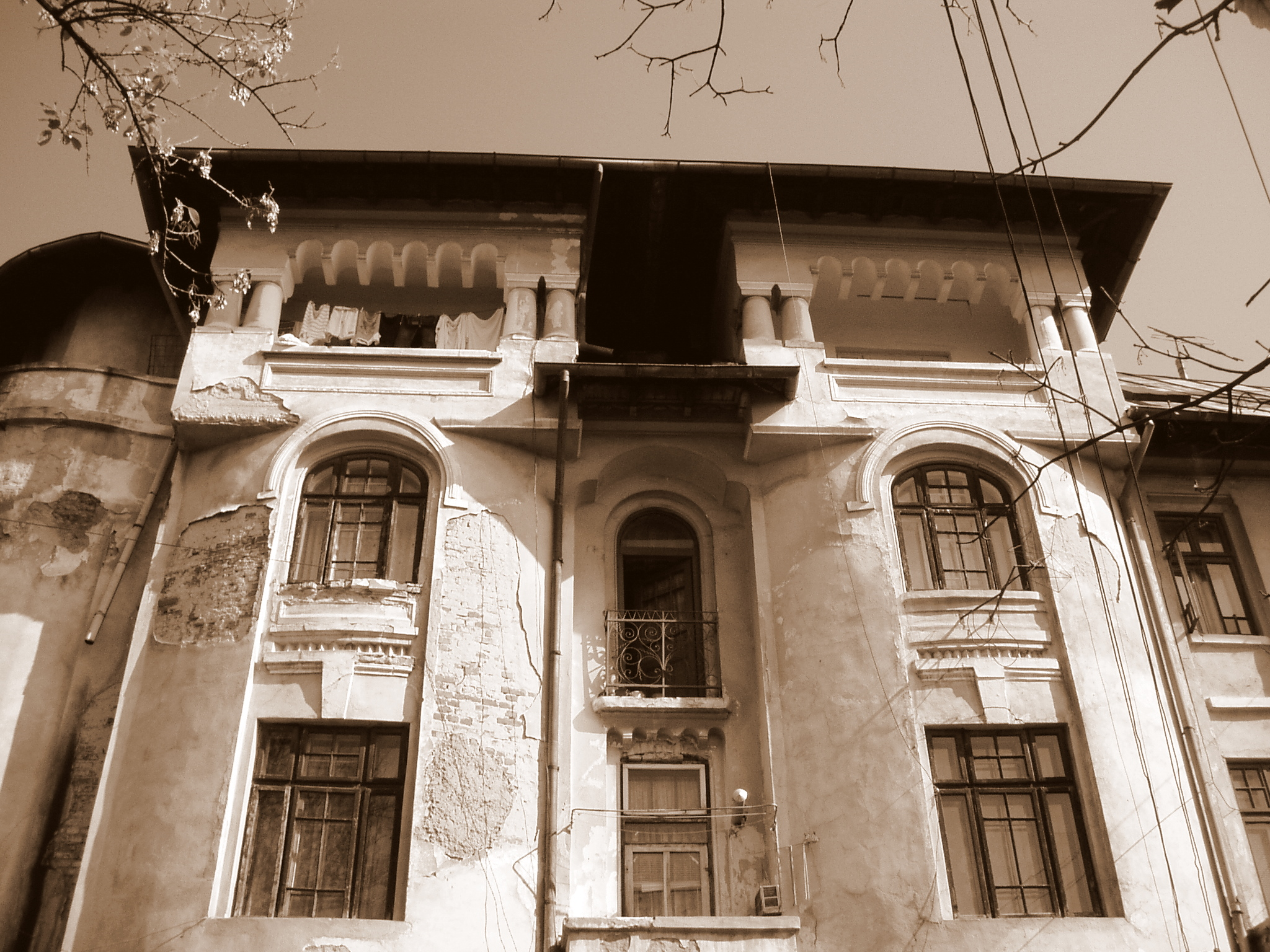

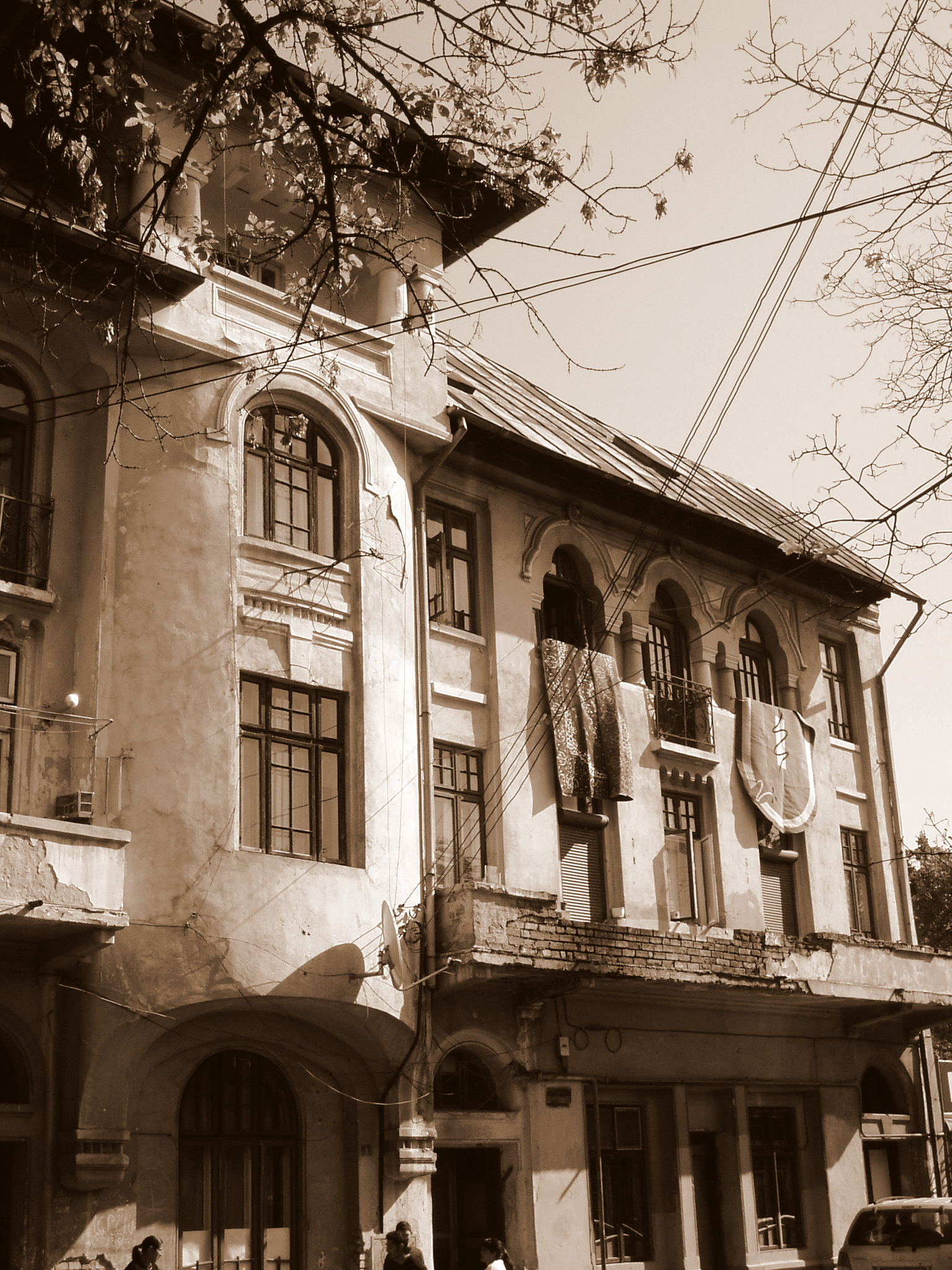

Toboc building.

- Grigore Ivănceanu's house, a former lawyer and friend of the architect, on the Rahovei road, at No. 6. Built around 1920, (Note: pages 112–113, 119, 138, 140, 142, and 204.) it was heavily damaged by the 1944 anglo‑american bombings, but was rebuilt almost identically by Grigore Ivănceanu shortly after the bombings. Sold in 2008 by Alice Ivănceanu, heir and daughter of the lawyer, the house was entirely renovated and externally insulated in 2009, losing part of its original style, particularly all the decorative exterior window surrounds. A photograph was published in the Arhitectura magazine in 1925. (Note: Toma T. Socolescu, Vila Avocat Gr. Ivănceanu – Ploești, photograph, 1925, year IV, page 77.)
- Family vault of Gheorghiu at the Viișoara cemetery. A photo was published in the Arhitectura magazine in 1925. (Note: Toma T. Socolescu, Cavoul Fam. Gheorghiu, Ploești, photograph, 1925, year IV, page 54.) It has since been demolished.
- House of Ștefan Z. Ghica Ghiculescu, a prominent merchant and vice‑president of the Ploiești Chamber of Commerce and Industry in 1933–1934. (Note: pages 123, 138, 141–143 and 204.) (Note: History and photographs pages 190–195.) Built at number No. 4 on strada Italiană in 1927–1928, it is perfectly preserved, furnished and restored by his grandson Mihai Bădulescu-Ghiculescu, despite confiscation and interior degradation by tenants during the entire communist period. According to Mihai Bădulescu, who knew Toma T. Socolescu well, the latter regularly visited his friend Ștefan Z. Ghica Ghiculescu and chose all the interior decoration at the time of finishing. Also at the initiative of Mihai Bădulescu, the house was listed in category A of historic monuments on 4 October 2010. Upon his death in 2019, the house was put up for sale by his heirs, who unfortunately got rid of the interior furniture and antique trinkets and porcelain chosen by Mihai Bădulescu, thus losing the soul of its rooms and an ambience frozen in the 1920s. After a failed attempt by the city of Ploiești to repurchase it in 2020, exercising its right of pre-emption, the villa was acquired by a new owner in 2023 and is currently under renovation.

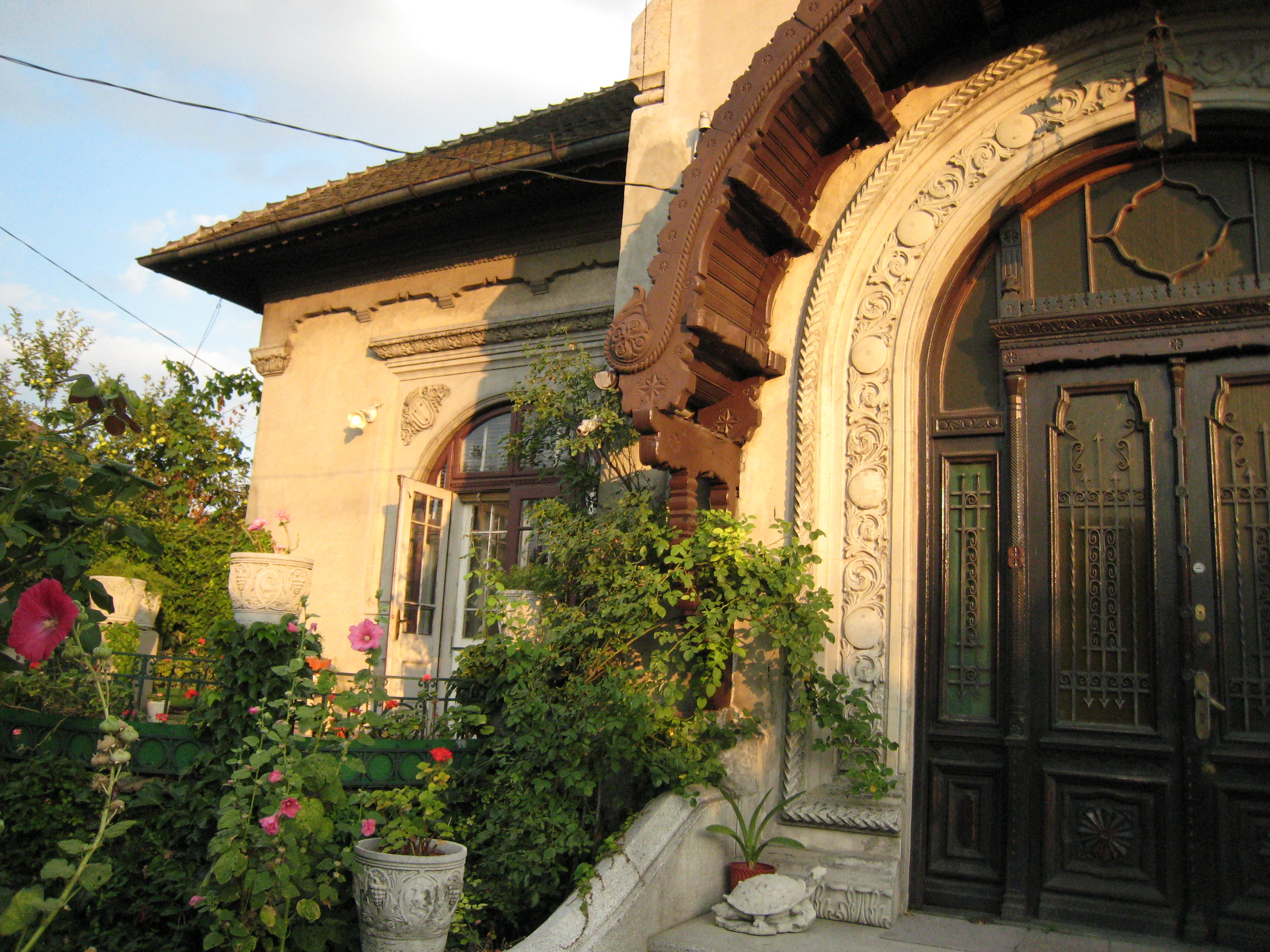
House of Ștefan Z. Ghica Ghiculescu.

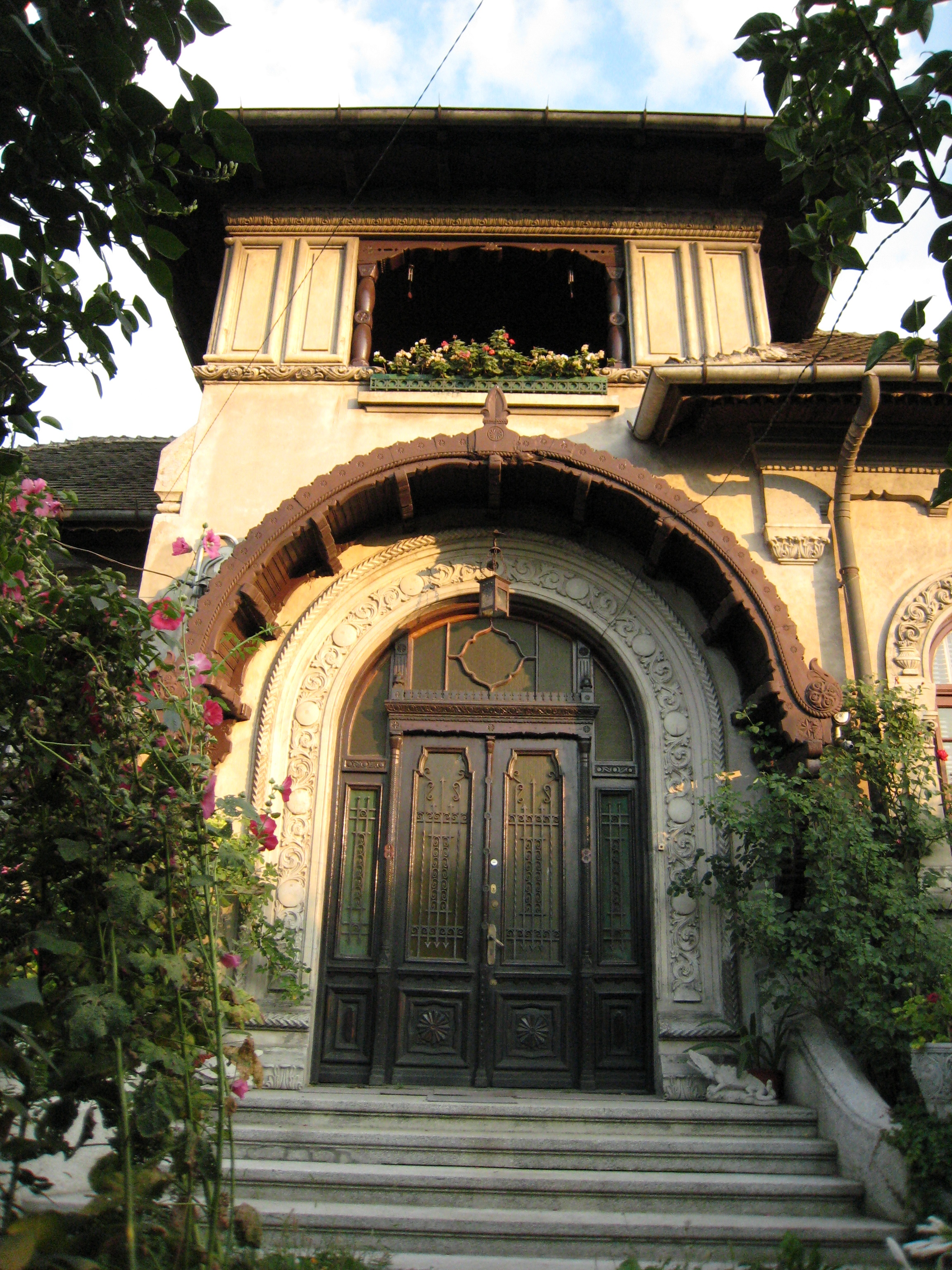
House of Ștefan Z. Ghica Ghiculescu.

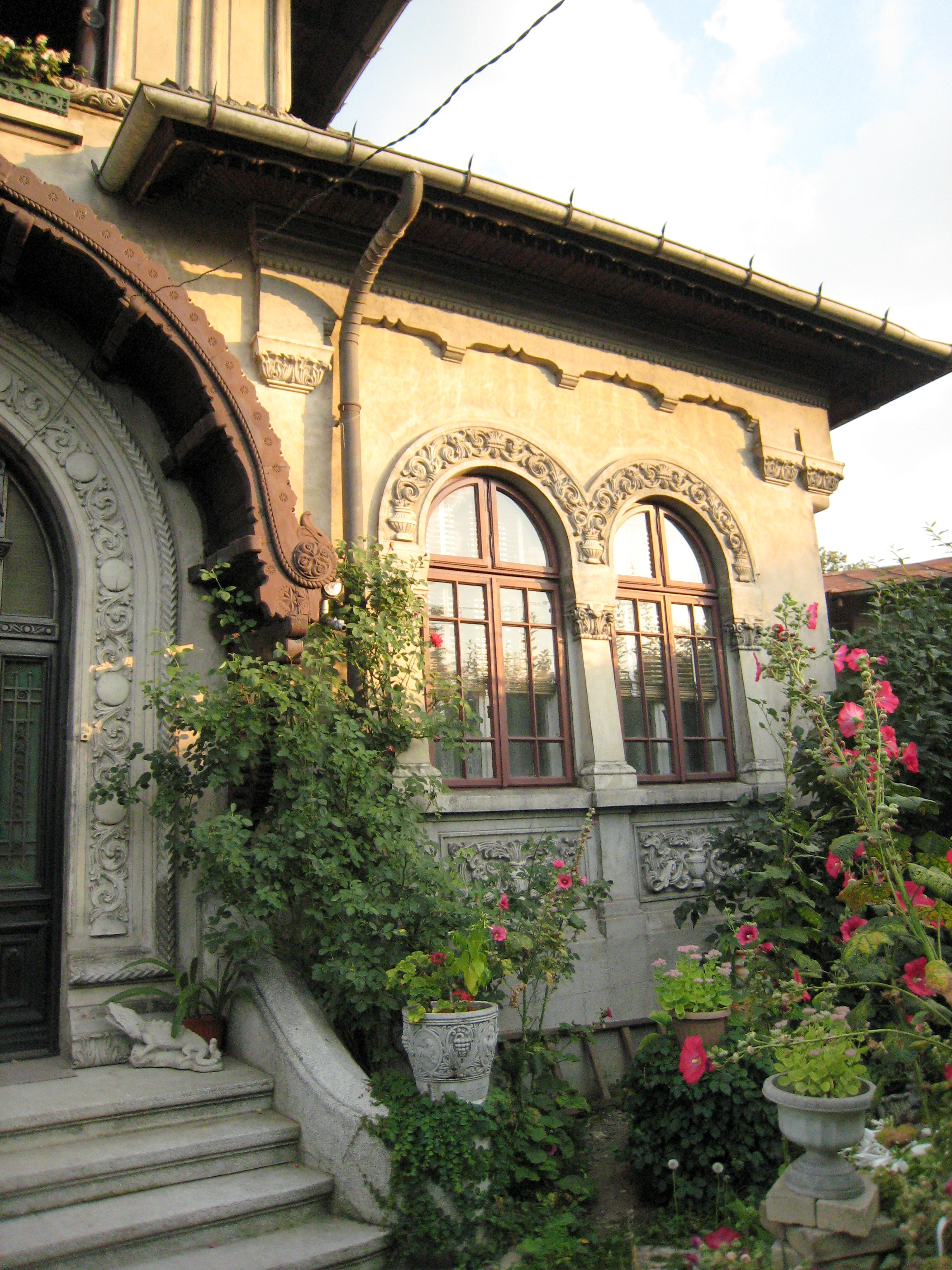
House of Ștefan Z. Ghica Ghiculescu.

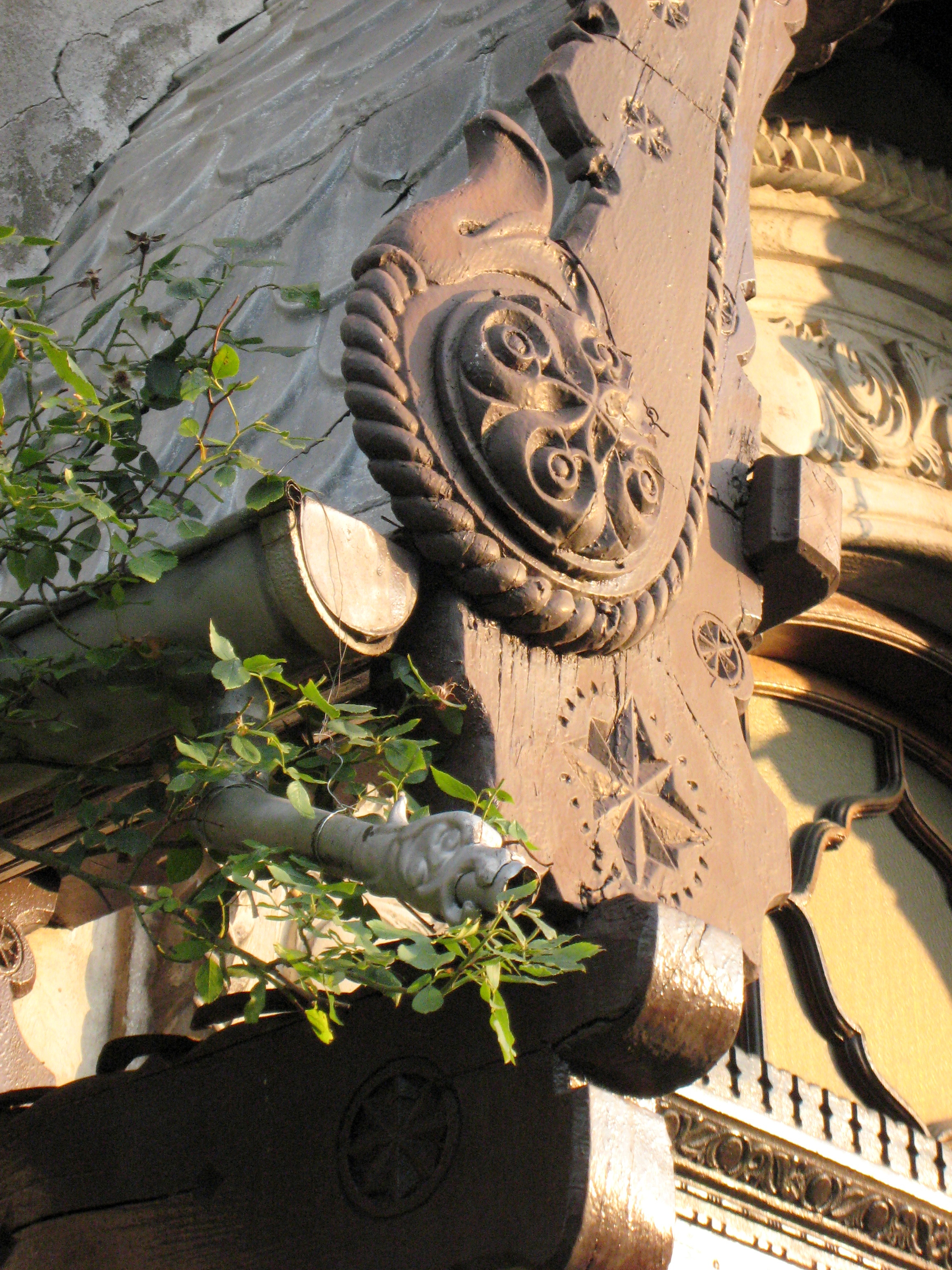
House of Ștefan Z. Ghica Ghiculescu.

House of Ștefan Z. Ghica Ghiculescu.

==== Public buildings ====
- Hotel Europa, renovated and expanded with an additional floor in collaboration with his uncle Ion N. Socolescu before 1914–1915. (Note: pages 22–23 and 203.) The hotel was originally built by his grandfather Nicolae Gh. Socol. (Note: pages 37–38.) (Note: pages 177–178.) (Note: page 185.) It was eventually demolished by the communist regime in the early 1960s.

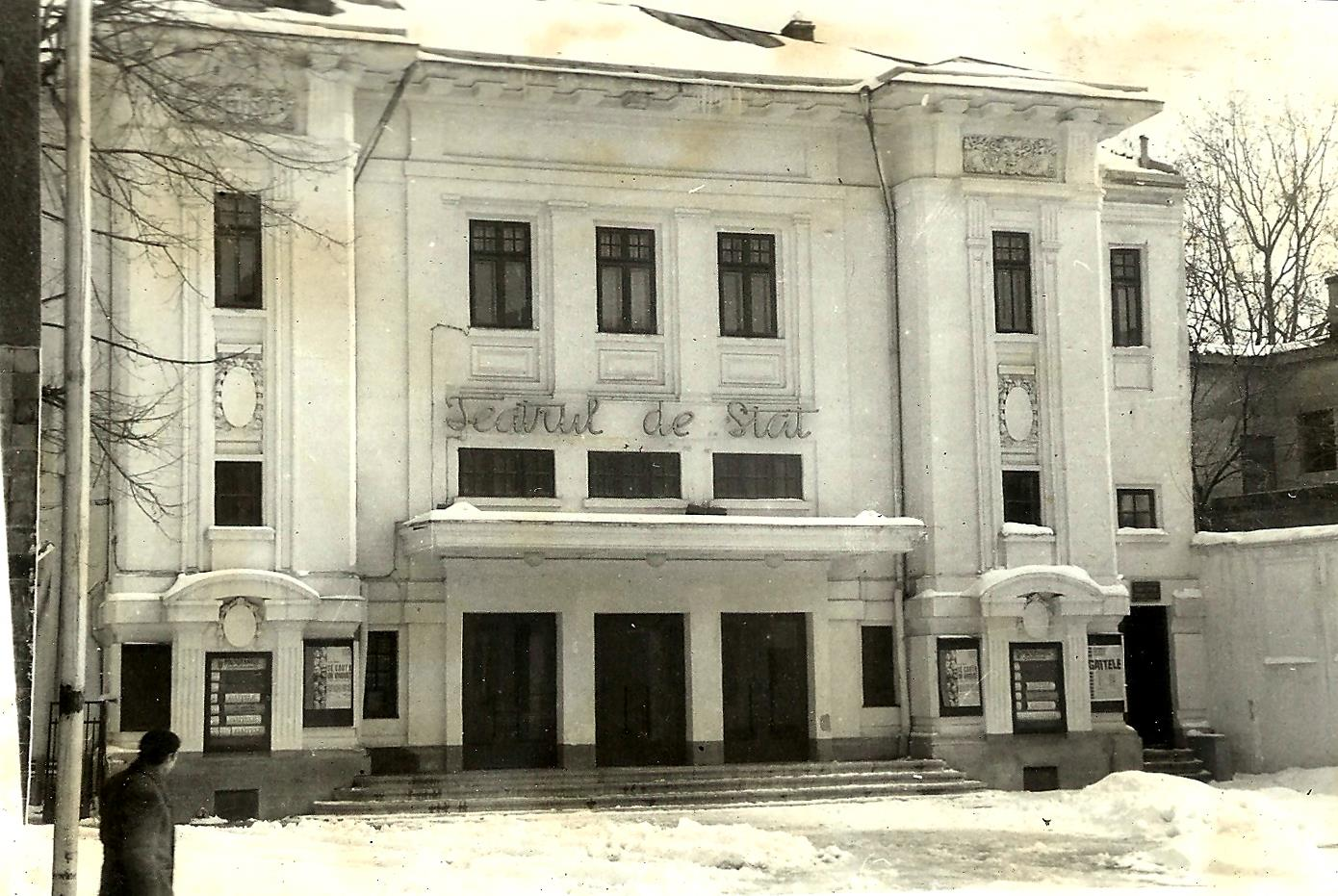
The Odeon Theatre around 1970.

- Theatre and later cinema Odeon. Its construction took place in 1927, and it was inaugurated on 23 February 1928. Historian Lucian Vasile describes the building’s distinctive features on his website republicaploiesti.net:
  The Odeon cinema-theatre was a building that did not conform to the "Socolescu style", but with its simplified façade, it leaned toward modernist lines. Slightly set back from the street, a small square was created in front of the building, where carriages or automobiles would drop off spectators. But the main asset of the Odeon lay in its features, unmatched in Ploiești at the time: a capacity of 550 seats, a mezzanine loggia, a ventilation system, excellent acoustics, and, above all, a spacious stage 20 meters wide and nearly 30 meters long (translated from Romanian)
  . It was already operating as a cinema by 1932. Renamed Rodina following its nationalisation in 1948, it became home to the Teatrul de Stat din Ploiești from 1955. It was first transformed and modernised by the communists in 1954. By 1957, following extensive renovations which further modernised the stage and increased the capacity to 600 seats, the building's exterior remained recognisable.

Following the earthquake of 4 March 1977, the building was entirely disfigured and buried at the base of a Soviet-style apartment block, as part of the communist systematization plan. (Note: Lucian Vasile (historian) (5 May 2016). "De la Sala Odeon la Teatrul "Toma Caragiu"" [From the Odeon Hall to the "Toma Caragiu" Theatre]. republicaploiesti.net (Republica Ploiești - Povești despre vechiul Ploiești) (in Romanian). "History and photographs of the Odeon Theatre" – The old building maintained its appearance until 1978, when the systematisation plan was implemented. The surrounding buildings were demolished and replaced with an apartment block. The square and the façade of the old Odeon disappeared, and the hall was masked by the new construction at ground level, which now houses the entrance, ticket office, and theatre foyer. The interior underwent successive changes, and the modernisation works of the 2000s erased the last decorations that still evoked the interwar design. The identity of the building was lost over time, not due to bombing or earthquakes, but due to communist systematisation and post-1989 modernisation. From an elegant building, the current seat of the "Toma Caragiu" Theatre in Ploiești has been transformed into a simple performance hall attached to a residential block (English translation).) It was renamed Teatrul Toma Caragiu on 6 September 1991. The street on which the theatre is located underwent multiple name changes: strada Liceului from the 19th century to the 1920s, strada Dr. I. Radovici until around 1948, strada Gh. Dimitrov from 1948 to the 1960s, strada teatrului until 1996, and finally strada Toma Caragiu since 1996.

- Gateway of the Ploiești fairgrounds, constructed around 1930, probably during the term of Mayor Ștefan Moțoiu, (Note: p. 438.) later becoming the entrance to the racetrack. Destroyed by the 1944 Anglo‑American bombings, the present gate is a pale replica of the original. (Note: p. 630 – period photograph (1937) compared to a contemporary photo available at: Andrei Hogas (12 May 2011). "Splendoare si uitare la Hipodromul Ploiești" [Splendor and Oblivion at the Ploiești Hippodrome]. national‑magazin.ro (Naţional Magazin) (in Romanian). "History and photographs of the Ploiești hippodrome".)

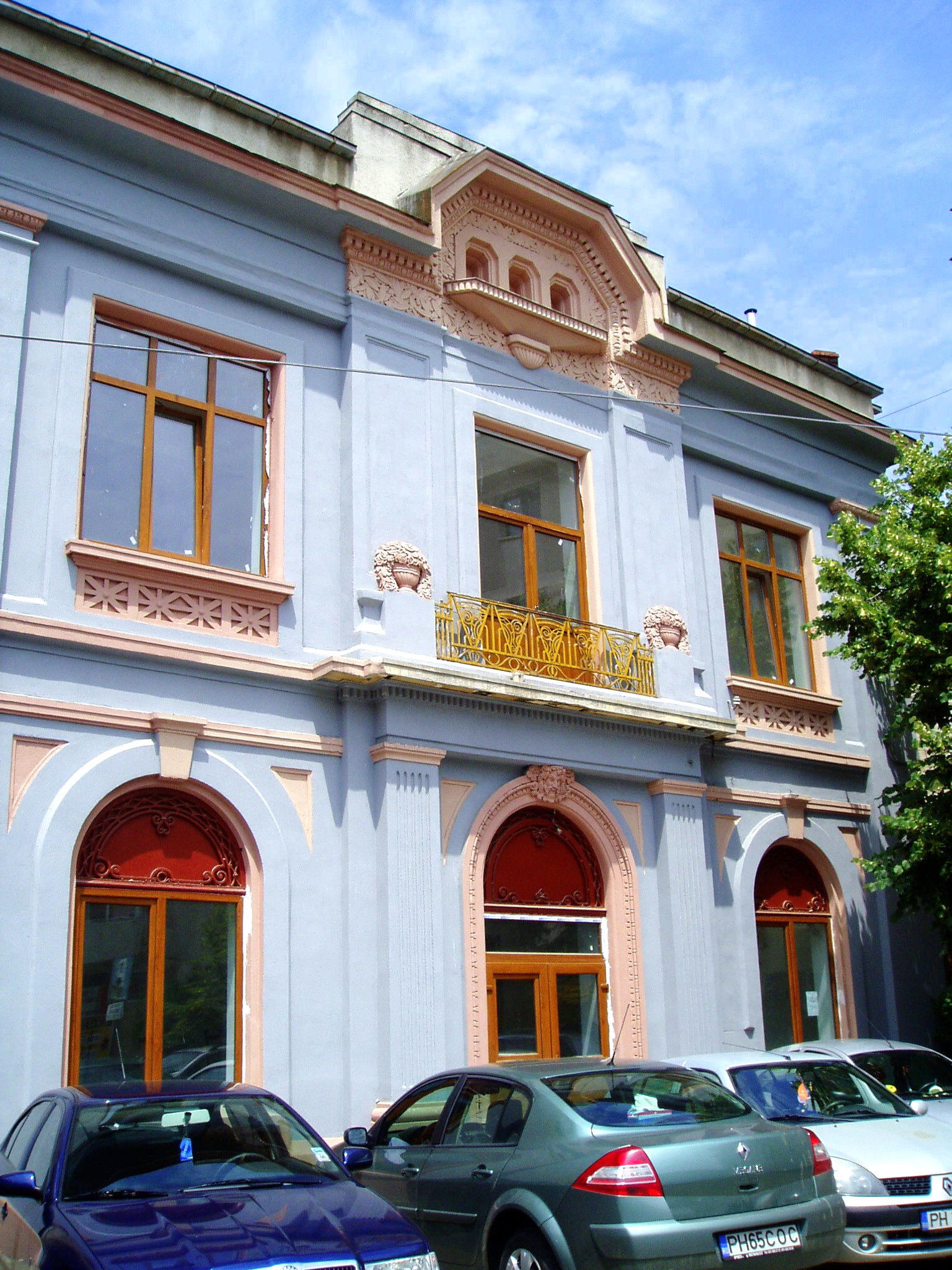
The Scala cinema.

- Luxurious renovation of the Central Bank of Ploiești's ground floor, completed before the 1929 financial crisis, the peak of Romanian banking activity in 1931–1932. Designed by Leonida Negrescu in the style of Charles Garnier, built for Ghiță Ionescu and owned by banker Max Schapira. The bank vacated during the 1929–1933 crisis. Afterwards, the space served as a pastry shop, then a fabric store. Nationalized in 1950, the building became the Mercur grocery store on the ground floor and a cobbler’s workshop above. Damaged by the 1977 Vrancea earthquake, it was demolished by the communist regime, citing irreparable damage, erasing one of the last traces of the historic downtown.
- Cinema Scala, still standing on strada Traian Moșoiu. Originally built as a brewery It was constructed for the Chamber of Commerce of Ploiești, under President Gérard Joseph Duqué around 1933. Decommissioned and abandoned in the 2000s, the building was renovated in 2009–2010. The main Chamber structure, predating this expansion, was severely damaged by the 1940 Vrancea earthquake and later demolished.
- Rural inn (Hanul țărănesc de la Bariera Bucov) at barrier Bucov, No. 2 on strada Oborului. Likely one of the architect’s last works (1938–1939). (Note: photographs pp. 140–142.) Built to shelter market traders and peasants, it was later moved to the city outskirts following the construction of the central market halls. Originally surrounded by stables, the one-story Romanian‑style villa featured a large oak‑pillared terrace and tiled roof, a stable for 40 animals, and a small administrative building at the back. During the National-Legionary dictatorship, it served as a shelter for Transylvanian refugees, then housed the Cernăuți nervous disorders hospital after the Soviet invasion of Northern Bukovina. Officially named the Rural Inn Hospital, it was severely damaged during 5 April 1945 bombing and evacuated to Filipeștii de Pădure. In October that year, a unit for Soviet troops opened there. From 1951, it operated as the county neurology department. The building continues to function as a hospital to this day (Ploiești County Emergency Hospital, Pneumology Service).

=== In Prahova county ===
==== Houses, villas, and apartment buildings ====
- Two houses for members of his family: Ion Diamandescu, a major oil magnate and Costică Dușescu, built in 1908, in Câmpina.

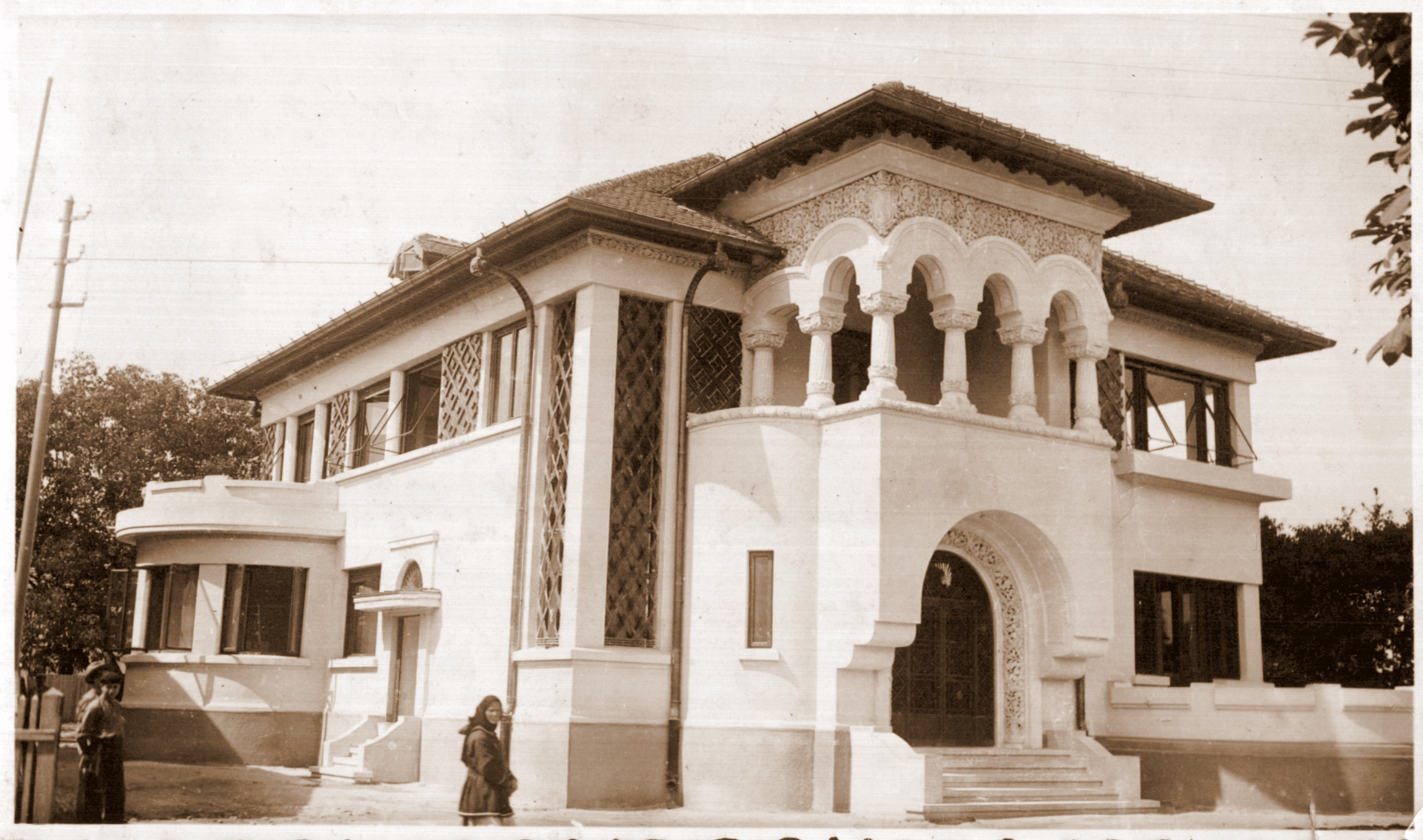
Villa of Dr. Gheorghiu.

- House of Nicolae Iorga in Vălenii de Munte, restoration, re‑arrangement and extension, (Note: pages 177, 179, 187‑188) in 1910. Listed as a historical monument.
- Villa of Nicolae Iorga in Sinaia, built around 1918. Listed as a historical monument; the house, at No. 1 strada Gheorghe Doja, is perfectly preserved by the historian’s family. It stands at the intersection of calea Codrului and strada Gheorghe Doja in the Furnica quarter. (Note: pages 99, 112, 126, 134, 138, 140, 142 and 204.)
- Pharmacy and rental building of Voiculescu, Câmpina. Probably built around 1920. The entire building was demolished after the 1977 earthquake.
- Villa of Dr. Gheorghiu, Câmpina, around 1920, also called the lion house. The villa remains visible, unchanged, on bulevard Carol I at the level of the aleea rozelor. (Note: pages 111, 113, 120, 138, 140‑141 and 204.)
- Manor of Gérard Joseph Duqué at Păulești, on the southern border of the commune with the city of Ploiești, built from 1920 to 1935. (Note: pages 138, 141 and 204.) The house was commissioned by lawyer Ion Georgescu Obrocea, then transferred to Gérard Joseph Duqué in debt repayment; it was redesigned by the architect following the new owner’s wishes. The manor has undergone multiple modifications and simplifications since its construction. Only certain typical parts still bear witness to the architect’s creation.

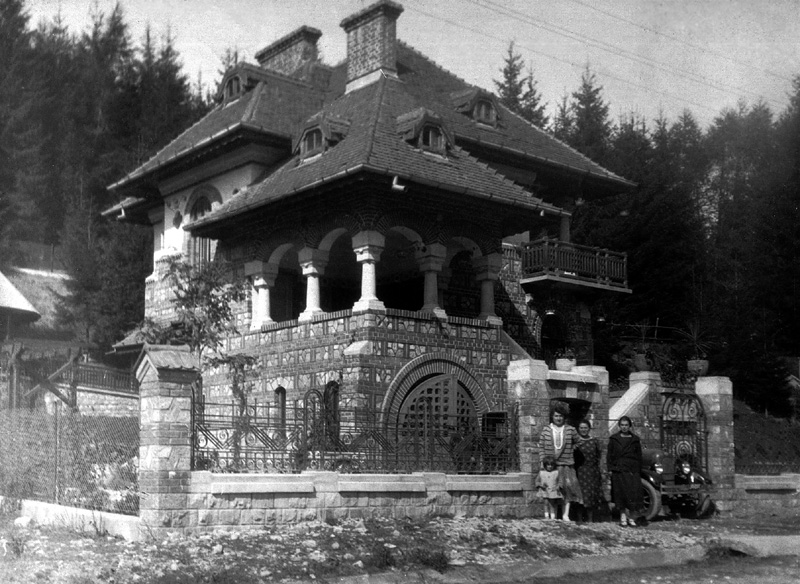
The villa in 1925.

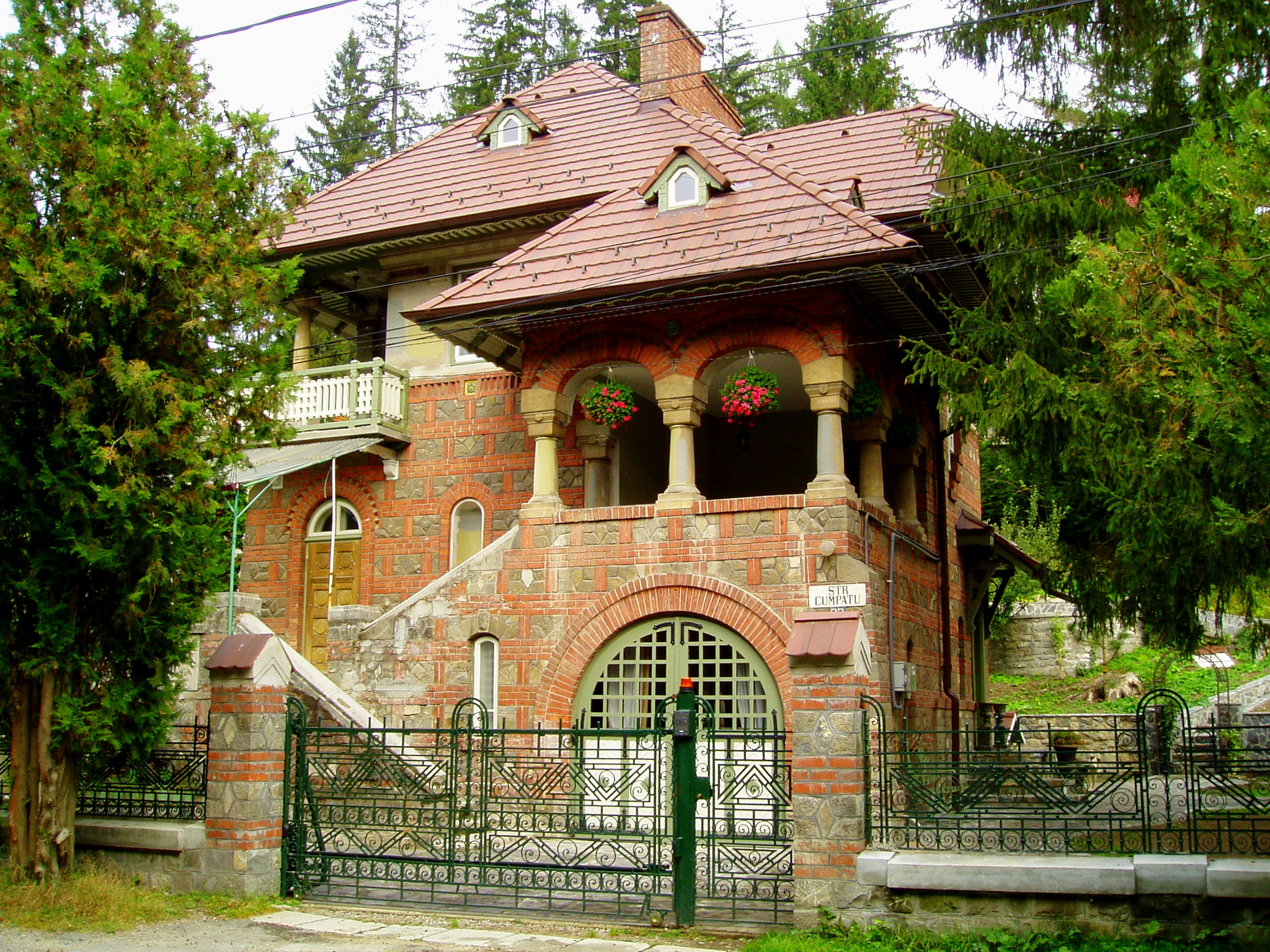
The villa in 2009.

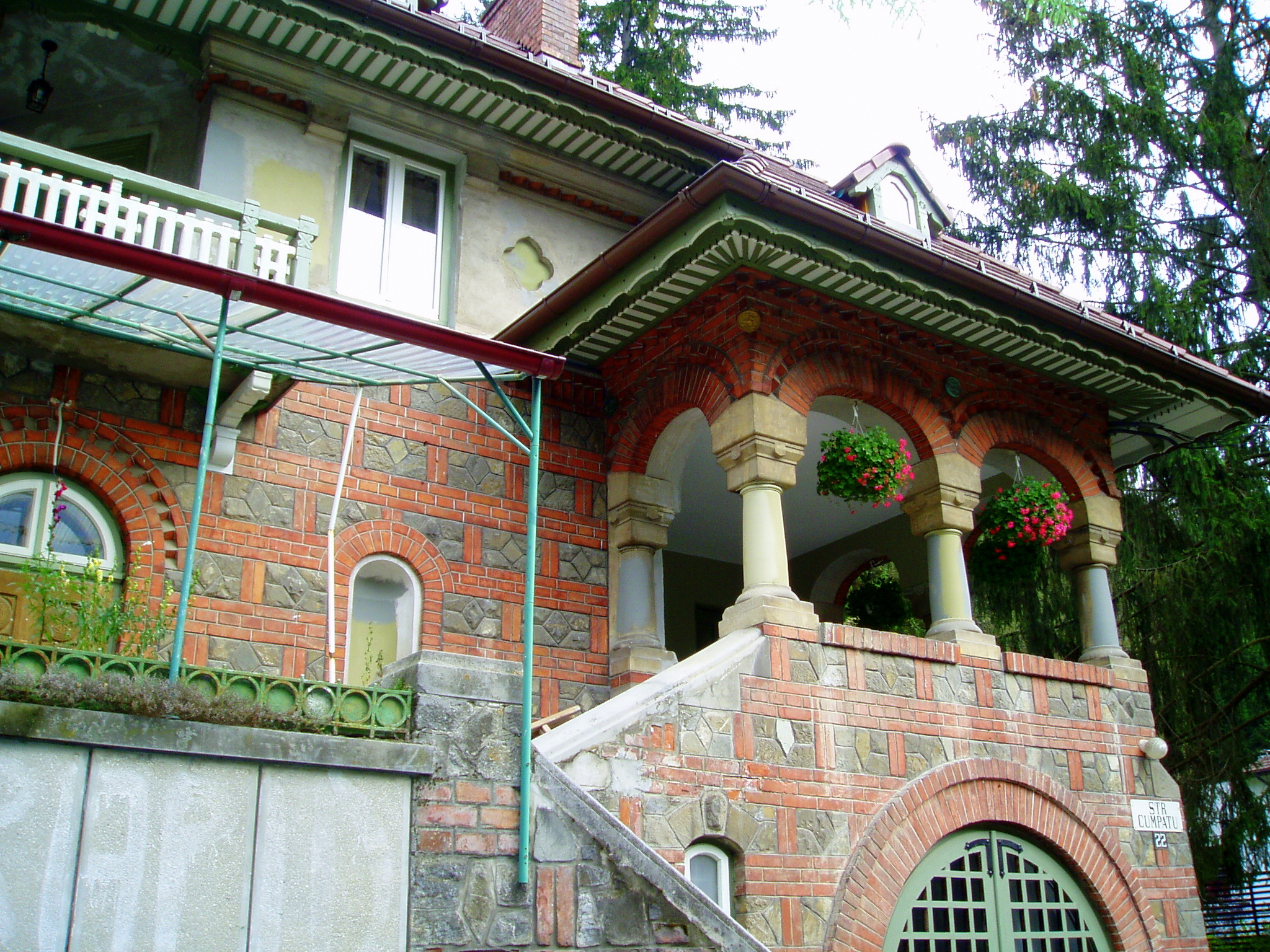
Neo‑Brâncovenesc balcony.

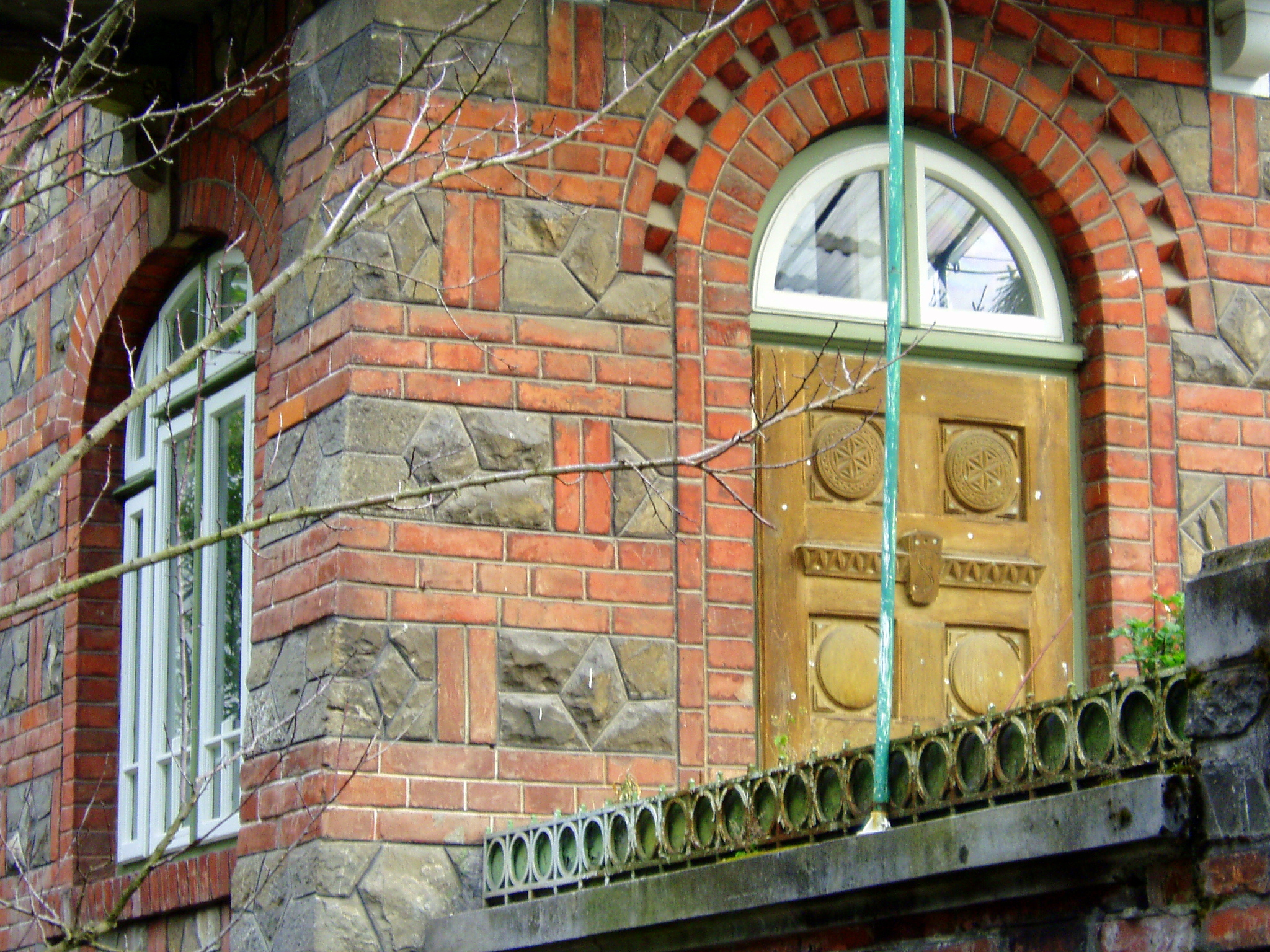
The main door.

The Florica Socolescu villa.

- Villa C. I. Ionescu in Sinaia, in 1923.
- Villa N. Scorțeanu in Sinaia, in the Cumpătu quarter. (Note: pages 112‑113, 129, 138, 140, 142‑143 and 204.) A photograph of the villa was published in the journal Arhitectura in 1925. (Note: Toma T. Socolescu, Vila N. Scorțeanu ‑ Sinaia ‑ "Cumpătul", photograph, 1925, year IV, page 76.)
- Villa Florica Socolescu in Sinaia, in the Cumpătu quarter, built in 1925. (Note: pages 112, 113, 138, 128‑129, 140 and 204.) Located in Sinaia‑Cumpătu at No. 22 strada Cumpătu. Built by Toma T. Socolescu for his wife Florica. The house was probably sold by the architect around 1945. Renovated in the 2000s, it has been virtually unaltered. Photographs and an interior plan of the villa were published in 1925 and 1941 in the journal Arhitectura. (Note: Toma T. Socolescu, Vila proprie ‑ Sinaia ‑ "Cumpătul", perspective photographs and ground‑floor plan, 1925, year IV, pages 74‑75.; Toma T. Socolescu, Vilă la Sinaia, photograph, January‑March 1941, year VII, issue 1, page 193.)

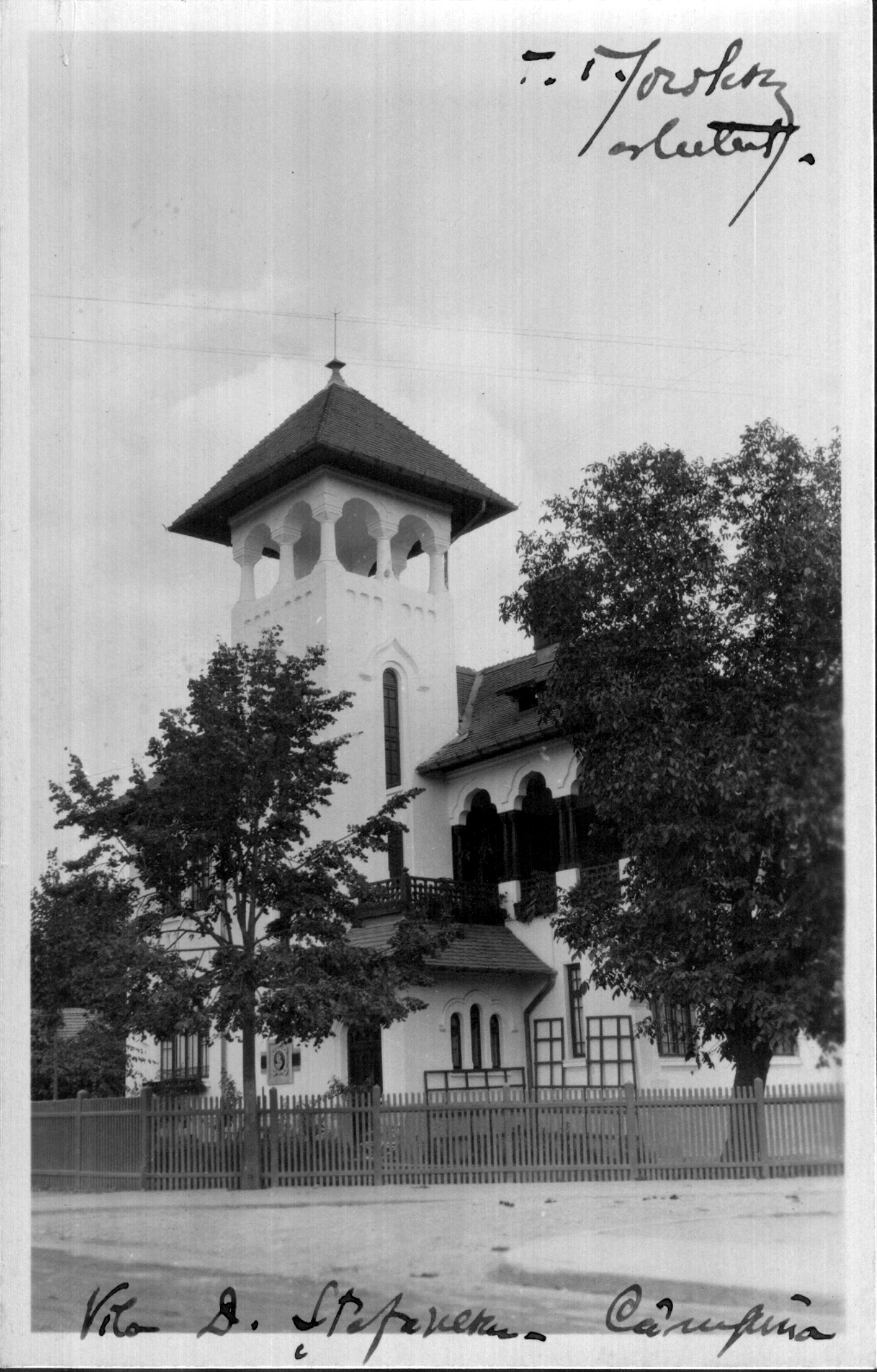
Villa D. Ștefănescu around 1930.

- House of his friend, painter Toma Gheorghe Tomescu in Vălenii de Munte around 1926‑1927. A modest dwelling whose original appearance has been modified over time. It is located at No. 12 strada Mihai Eminescu. (Note: Information, photographs and watercolours pages 178‑179.)
- House of Ion Pătrașcu in Vălenii de Munte, built around 1927, located at No. 5 strada George Enescu, not far from Nicolae Iorga’s house. It was built for merchant Ion Pătrașcu. Confiscated by the communists in 1950, it was returned, then resold by the merchant’s family. It still exists, very well preserved. (Note: History and photographs pages 180‑181.)
- Houses of agronomist engineer Toma Călinescu (strada Monumentului No. 2), and schoolteacher Emil Popescu (strada Armoniei No.1), both in the commune of Boldești‑Scăeni. The house of Toma Călinescu, built around 1928, is today perfectly preserved. (Note: History and photographs pages 190‑191.)
- Villa Bran Al. Radovici in Sinaia, renovations in 1930.
- Villa Dumitru Ștefănescu, Câmpina, also called the clock house. Planned in 1916, constructed much later in 1930. (Note: pages 111‑112, 122, 138, 141 and 203.) The exterior appearance of the villa has been altered since, particularly the tower, rebuilt during the communist era in a different style, on which clocks were added. It is still visible at No. 112 bulevard Carol I, at the intersection with strada Henri Coandă. A 1916 edition of the journal Arhitectura presents plans and sketches of the villa. (Note: Vila Ștefănescu la Câmpina, drawings, 1916, year I, No. 2, May, page 66.)
- Villa of lawyer Grigore Ivănceanu, later owned by his daughter Alice Ivănceanu, in Sinaia, strada Piatra Arsă at No. 4, built in 1934. (Note: pages 127, 140 and 205.)
- Villa Nicolae Popescu-Parafină, Câmpina, around 1934‑1935. (Note: pages 113, 118, 143 and 205.) The villa is in very good condition.

==== Public buildings ====
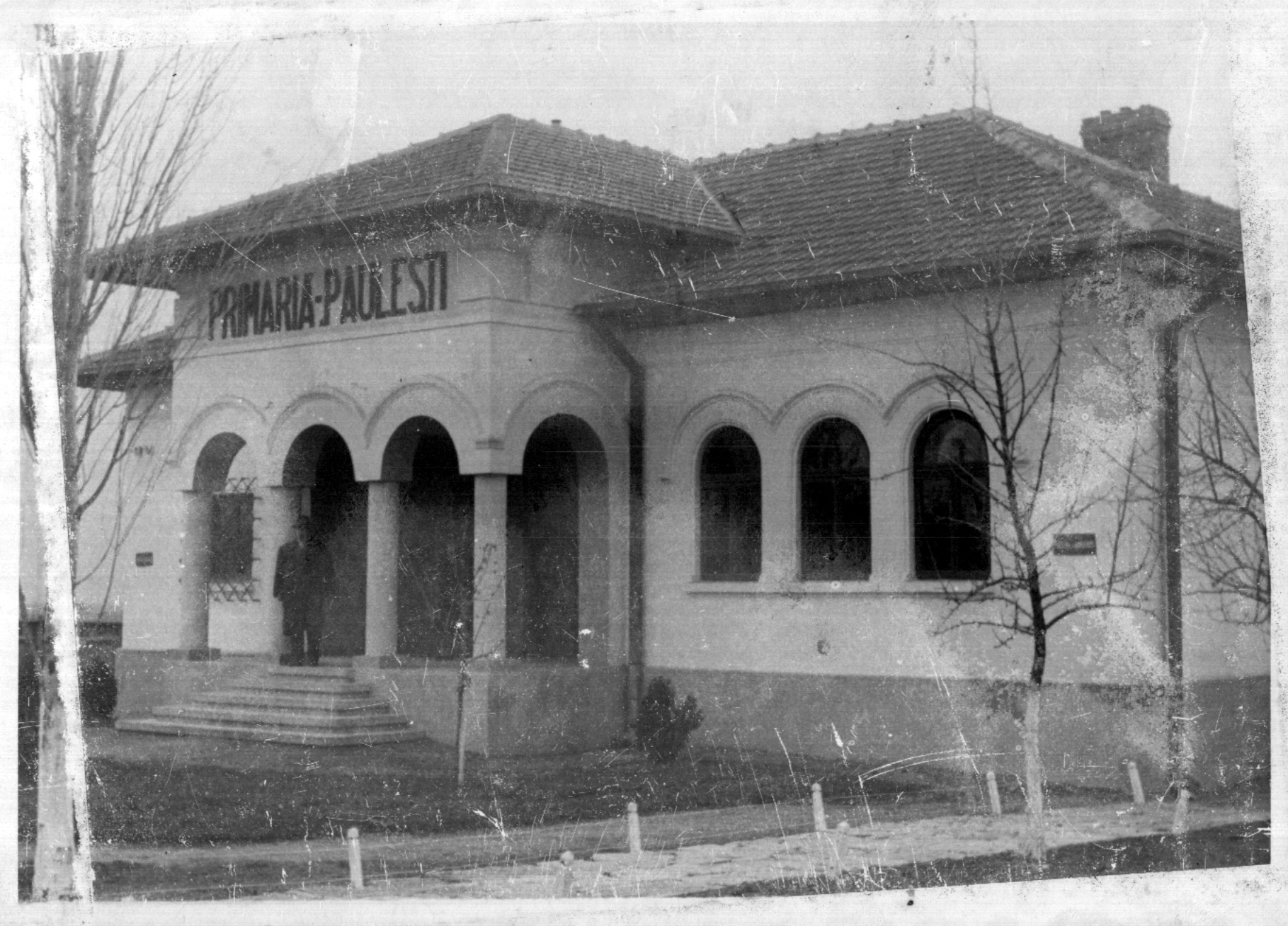
Town Hall of Păulești, 1939.

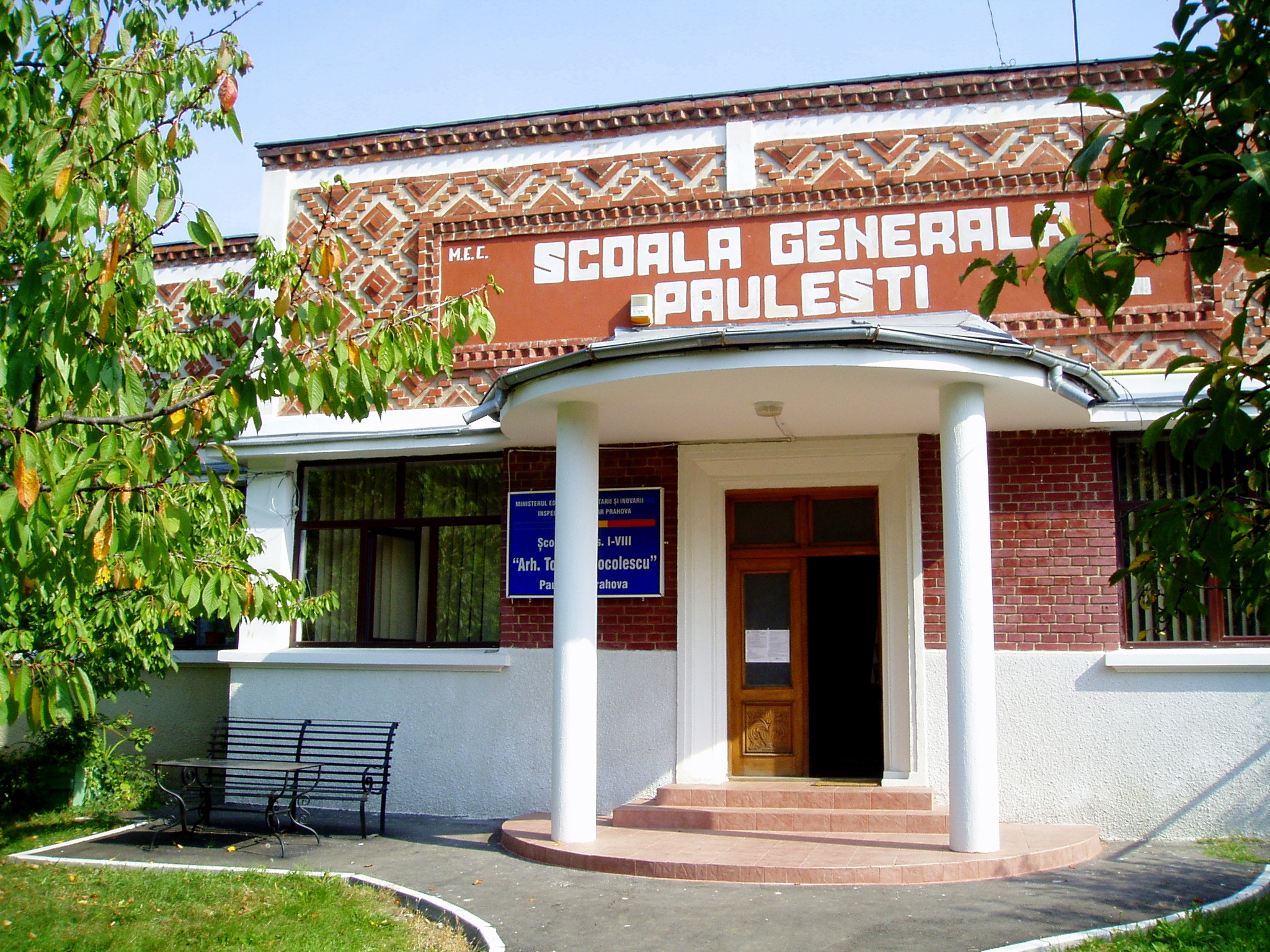
T.T. Socolescu School.

- Construction of the necessary buildings for the Nicolae Iorga Establishment, in Vălenii de Munte, where the summer universities of the same name have been held every year since 1910 and until 1940. These are two traditional buildings serving as dormitories, kitchens, and dining rooms. In 1912, he also built the building housing a lecture hall. (Note: pages 112, 134, 135, 136-137, and 203.) The three buildings are listed as historical monuments.
- Town Hall of Sinaia, renovation and extension between 1913 and 1914. (Note: pages 172, 197, and 203.)
- Town Hall of Câmpina: renovation and expansion around 1914-1915. (Note: page 47.) This was the former house of Zaharia Carcalechi built by his grandfather Nicolae G. Socolescu, restored by his father Toma N. Socolescu. (Note: pages 21 and 203.) The building was demolished to make way for a new town hall in 1922, which was itself destroyed by the Communists around 1980, as part of the reconstruction of the city's old center.
- Courts of Drăgăneşti, Gorgota, and Poienarii Burchii, built in 1913-1914, all based on the same model. (Note: pages 168 and 203.)
- First Instance Court, of Vălenii de Munte located at strada Mihai Bravu, number 26. Built starting in 1923, (Note: pages 166, 168, and 204.) the building is in poor external condition and is abandoned, completely neglected by its owner: the Romanian Ministry of Justice.
- Town Hall of the city of Urlați, for which the architect's contract and plans were established between 1914 and 1916, (Note: pages 51 and 56.) with construction taking place between 1922 and 1928. (Note: pages 173, 197, and 203.) The construction is remarkable and strongly features Neo-Brâncovenesc style. In May 2022, the mayor of the city, Marian Măchițescu, proposed the demolition of the town hall building in a municipal council meeting, with plans to rebuild it in the original style, arguing that its reinforcement is too costly or impossible (the building is assessed to be at maximum seismic risk). Due to the vehement opposition of the residents, elected representatives, and the actions of the Pro Patrimonio association, who want to preserve this "architectural gem," the mayor changed his mind and abandoned the demolition plan. The controversy led to the initiation of the process to classify the building as a historical monument by the National Heritage Institute. The procedure, during which any physical alteration to the building is prohibited, is still ongoing. The public baths and the agricultural center of the city were also constructed by the architect (likely around 1930). (Note: page 491.)

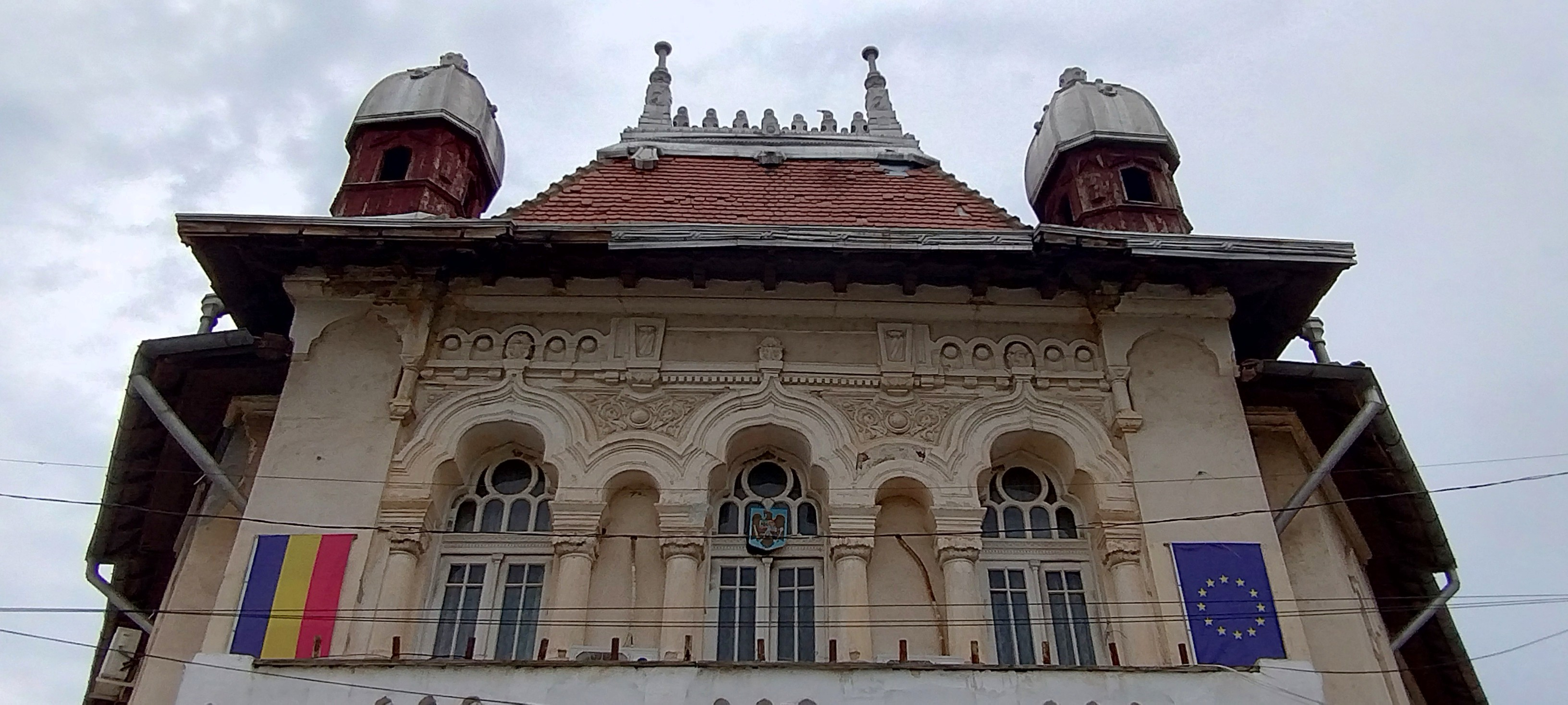
Town Hall of Urlați in 2024, front part of the building.

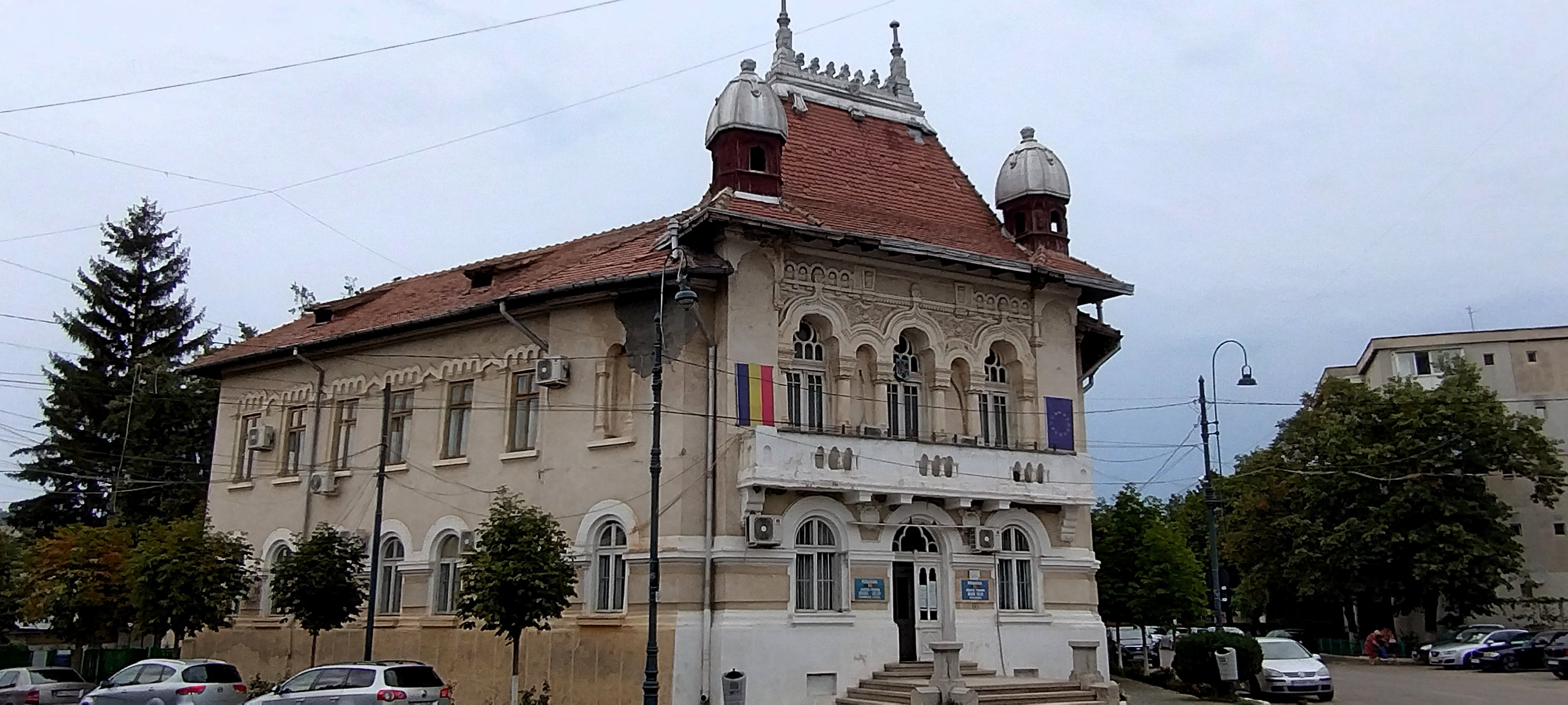
Town Hall of Urlați in 2024, façade.

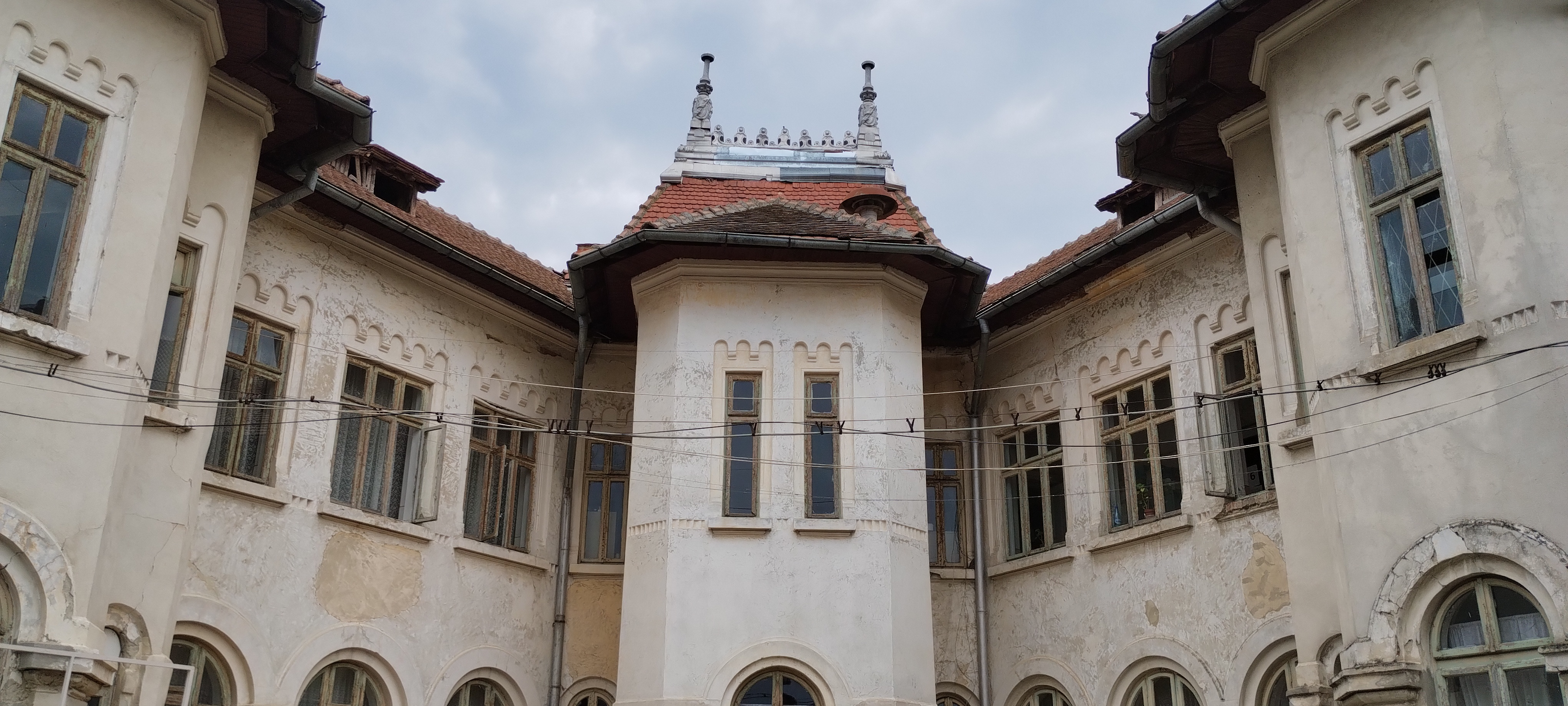
Town Hall of Urlați in 2024, rear side.

- First instance court in Câmpina, located at No. 14 strada 1 Decembrie 1918. The plans were developed around 1924. (Note: pages 144, 167-168, 197 and 204.) By 1931, the construction was completed and the Judecatoria de Pace Mixta Câmpina began its activities. The building is still active and houses the current judecatoria.
- Boys' school of the commune of Măneciu, built during the reign of Ferdinand I of Romania between 1922 and 1924, in memory of the heroes of the First World War. Built in neo-Romanian style, it was completely disfigured by a radical renovation between 2012 and 2016, destroying all of the building's style and decorations, and making the construction unrecognizable. The school was raised by one floor, thus altering all the proportions and perspectives. The roof structure was changed, the avant-corps transformed, the cornice almost shaved off on the upper floor, and the original wooden windows and doors were all replaced by crude PVC joinery without respecting the original dimensions or harmony of the windows. Finally, the building's exterior insulation smoothened out all the façade decorations and erased any trace of its original style. The school building, surrounded by a metal fence in a hybrid style of the communist era and mock-historic design, now houses the "Ferdinand I" College, but now resembles more of a barracks or penitentiary.

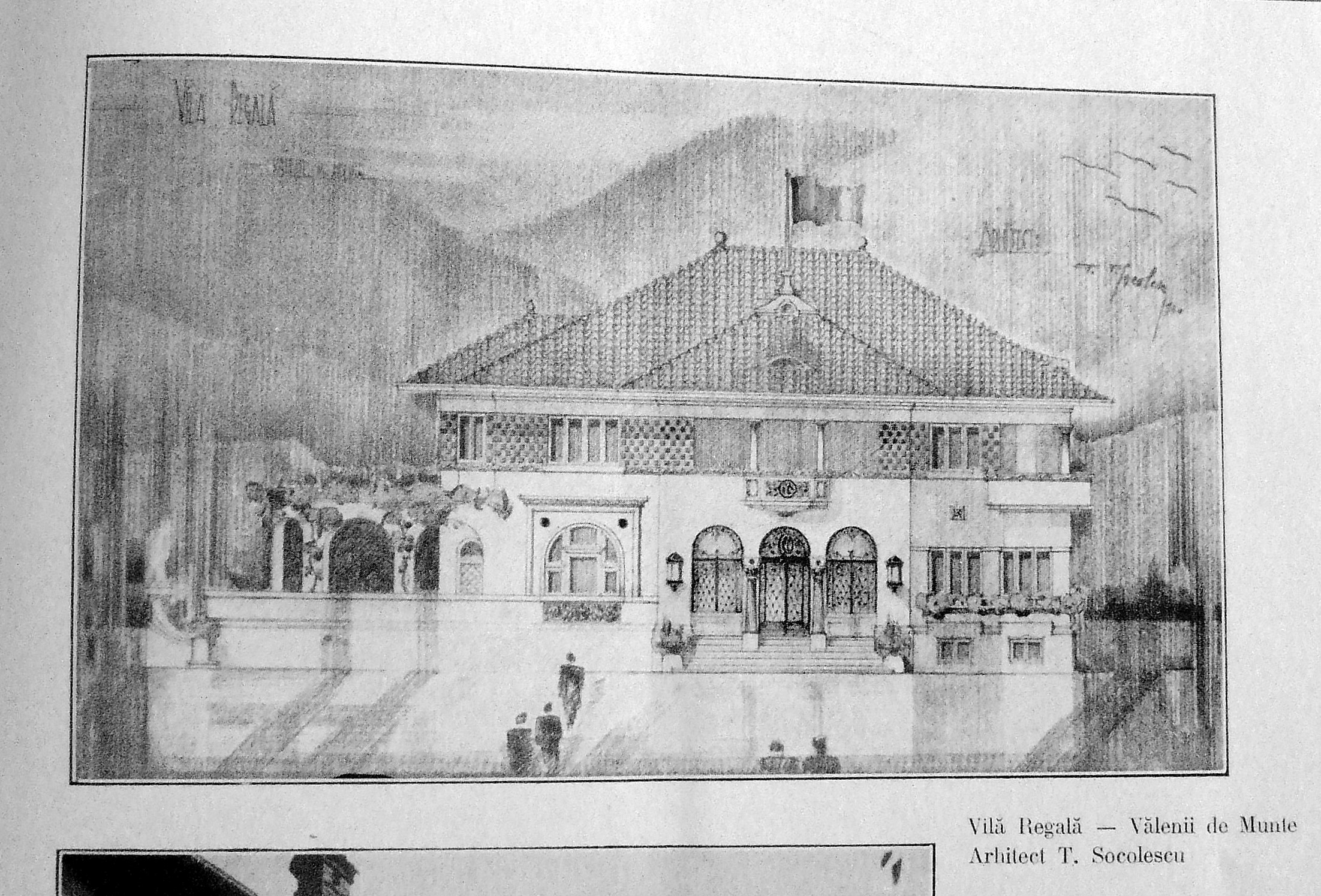
Royal House, Vălenii de Munte (plan).

- Royal House in Vălenii de Munte. Following the decision of Nicolae Iorga, the construction of a summer villa for Princess Elena and the young Prince Michael was planned and executed by the architect. (Note: Historical notes, sketches, and photographs pages 193-194.) The foundation stone was laid by Nicolae Iorga on 15 July 1930, in the presence of the architect, the Princess, and the Minister of Finance Mihai Popovici. A project board can be seen in the 1930 edition of the journal Arhitectura. (Note: Toma T. Socolescu, Vilă Regală - Vălenii de Munte, plan, 1930, Year VI, page 43.) The project was never fully realized. The house was ultimately used differently from its original purpose and became home to the Nicolae Iorga Popular Universities under the Princess Elena Foundation (Principesa Elena). The villa was completely destroyed by the communists after the 1977 earthquake.
- In Păulești, almost all the buildings, bridges, and public monuments, including the town hall between 1937 and 1940, the primary school between 1939 and 1944, the communal stable, and public baths. The town hall underwent an extensive renovation in 2022, which included adding an additional multi-story wing. Most of the Socolescu architectural style has almost completely disappeared. The windows and doors made of PVC have finished erasing the original harmony of the place.

==== Religious buildings ====
- Monument of the Trinity, a carved wooden shrine, created for the commune of Dumbrăvești in 1937. The monument no longer exists.
- Church of Our Lady, Source of Life (Izvorul Tămăduirii) in the commune of Izvoarele, Prahova, construction began in 1931 and was only completed in 1945 due to a lack of funds and the war. (Note: pp. 178, 180–181, and 205.)
- Church of the Assumption (Adormirea Maicii Domnului) in the commune of Boldești-Scăeni, constructed between 1936 and 1939, and featured in the magazine Arhitectura in March 1938. (Note: Toma T. Socolescu, Biserica din comuna Scăeni, județul Prahova, photograph and plan, March 1938, year IV, >No. 11, pp. 28–29.) The church's roof and towers were significantly altered several times starting in 1941. The building endured every major earthquake since the one in 1940, as the region is highly seismic. Of the original two massive towers (at the façade and rear), only one remains; the other was replaced by two smaller ones. The original aesthetic of the work has been lost. In 1938, he also built the cemetery chapel Eternitatea for the commune. (Note: pp. 178 and 205.)
- Funerary chapel of Toma Gheorghe Tomescu's family in Vălenii de Munte, constructed circa 1938–1939. The painter Tomescu executed the mural paintings. Named the Chapel of the Holy Trinity, it now serves as the town cemetery's chapel.
- A Trinity monument carved in oak in 1939 for Păulești (See section Păulești).

=== In Bucharest ===
==== Houses, villas, and apartment buildings ====
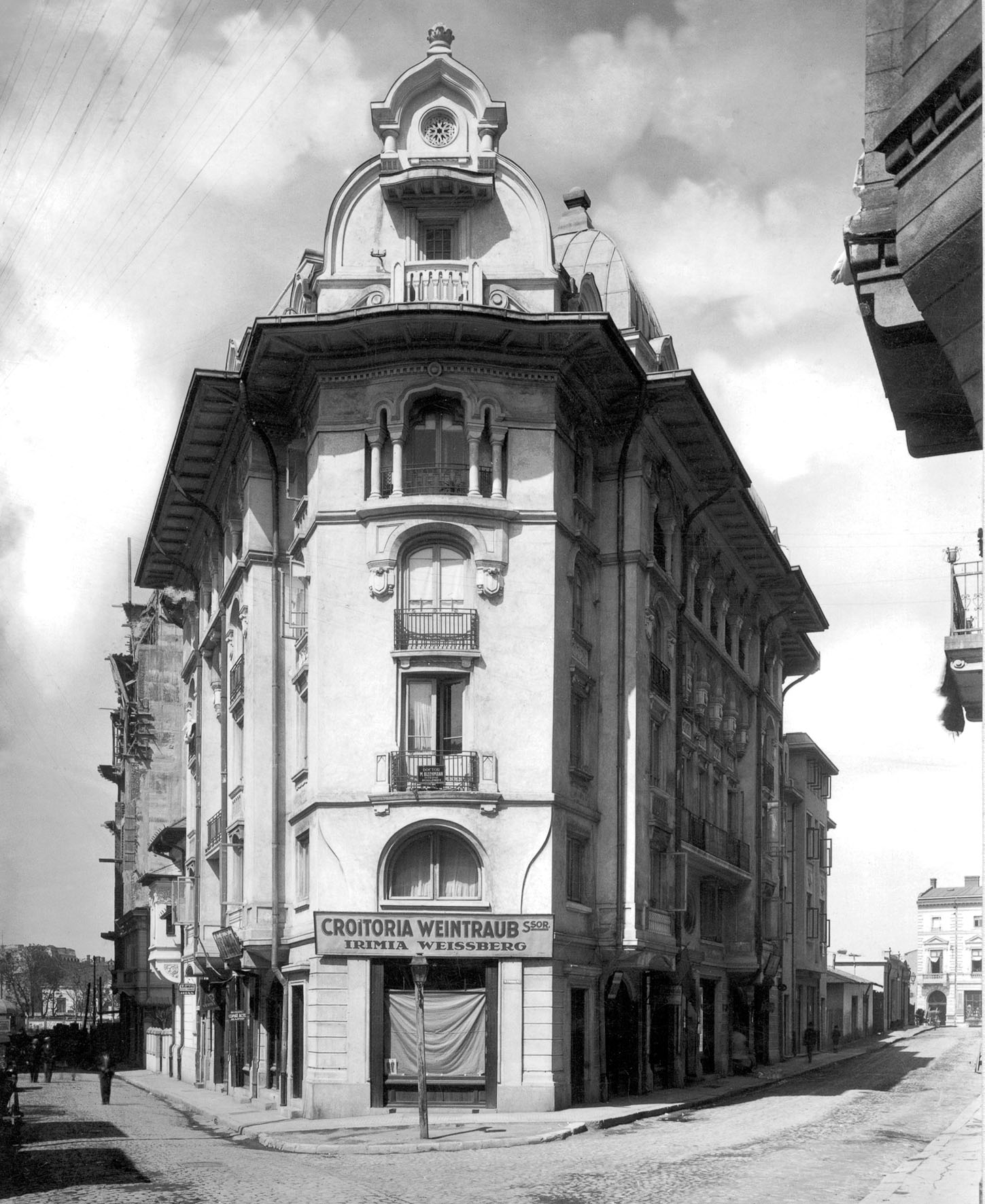
Building of the Tillman Brothers, circa 1925, Bucharest.

- A residential building located on calea Șerban Vodă, still extant, at No. 105. It was constructed based on the same model as the "Bogdan" building in Ploiești, but with an additional floor. (Note: pages 131, 133, 134, and 204.) Unfortunately, the building has been disfigured by unsightly insulating glazing, crude concrete work on part of the main balcony railing (originally made of wrought iron), and large windows that destroy the harmony originally envisioned by the architect. The two ground-floor entrances have also been simplified, completely losing their original style. A photograph of the building was published in the journal Arhitectura in 1924, (Note: Toma T. Socolescu, photograph, 1924, year III, page 143.) probably just after its construction.

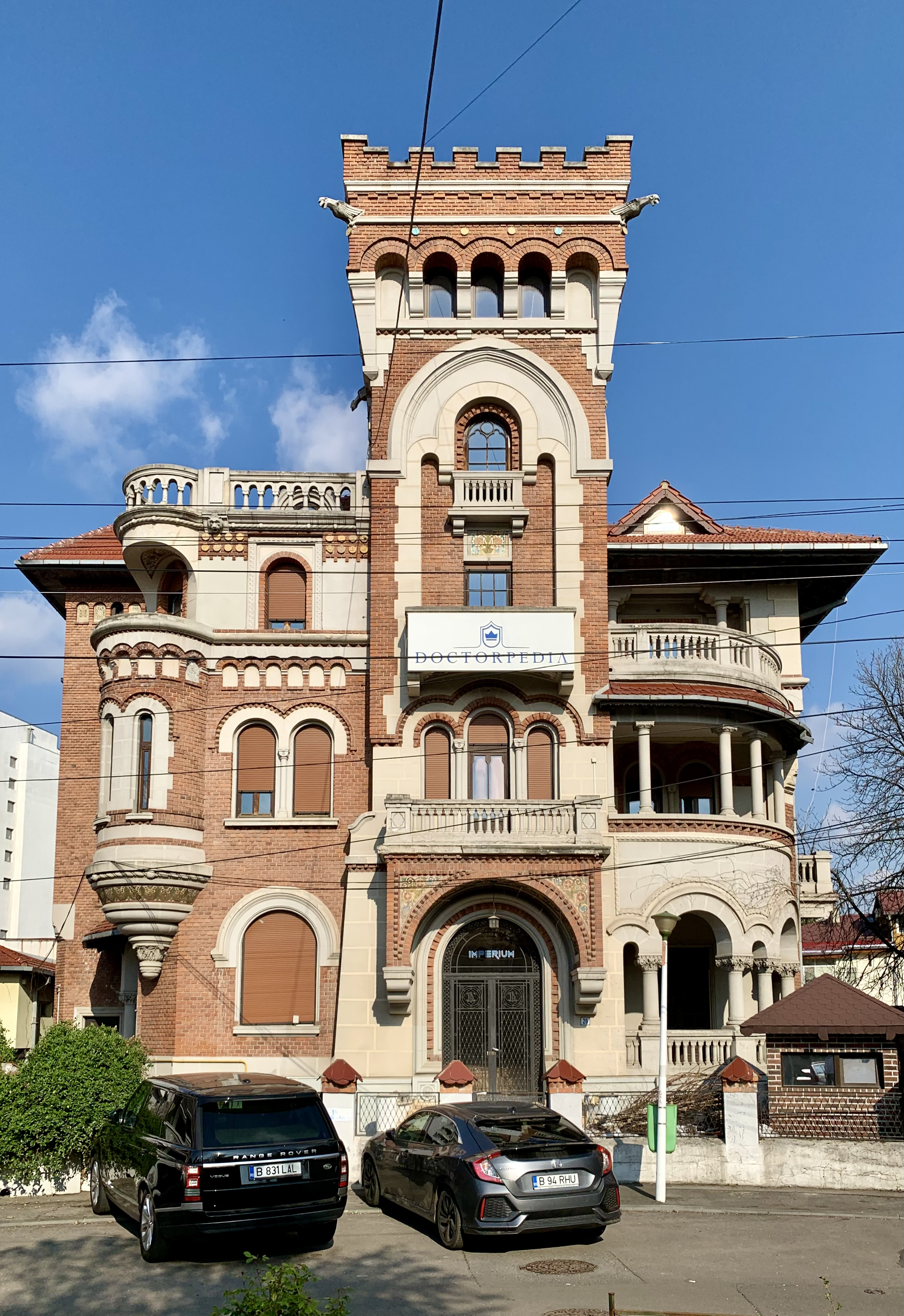
Villa D. Ionescu, Bucharest.

- Villa located on strada Mitropolit Antim Ivireanul, published in the journal Arhitectura in 1924. (Note: Toma T. Socolescu, photograph, 1924, year III, page 145.) Part of the street was demolished in the 1980s for the construction of the monumental and controversial People's House, as demanded by the communist dictator Nicolae Ceaușescu. The villa was destroyed during this process.
- The residential building of the Tillman (or Tilman) brothers. The building still stands. Before the communist era, it was located at No. 54 strada Carol, at the intersection of strada Carol (now strada Brâncoveanu) and strada Filittis. It is now situated at the intersection of strada Filitti and Tonitza, not far from Piață Națiunile Unite (United Nations Square), which was known during the Interwar period as Piață Senatului (Senate Square). The building was constructed in 1926. (Note: pages 130, 131, 134, 138, and 204.) Its style is very similar to that of the Creditul Prahovei building in Ploiești, designed around 1923. The structure has lost part of its upper façade gable, thus diminishing its prominence and beauty. It is highly probable that the 1940 and the 1977 earthquakes severely affected this structure, leading to its simplification. (Note: photographs page 130.) (Note: photographs pages 79-80.)
- Villa of engineer Al. Gheorghiade in the parcul Bonaparte, built between 1923 (Note: The date of the plans as indicated in the municipal archives: Arhiva PMB-tehnic, dosar 514/1923 - page 123.) and 1926. (Note: pages 111-113, 123, and 204.) The park is located in a triangle bounded by strada Paris, șoseaua Iancu de Hunedoara (formerly șoseaua Bonaparte), and calea Dorobantilor. The villa was located at No. 39 on strada Londra. Now demolished, it was entirely razed in 1942 to make room for another villa, which bears no resemblance to the original house. Only two photographs of the villa were published in the journal Arhitectura, one in 1926, and another in 1941. (Note: period photographs: Toma T. Socolescu, Prop. Ing. Al. Gheorghiade. Parcul Bonaparte, photograph, 1926, year V, page 113.; Toma T. Socolescu, Casa Gheorghiade, photograph, January–March 1941, year VI, issue 1, page 193.)
- Villa D. Ionescu, built in 1927, located on strada Mihai Cogălniceanu (also spelled Kogălniceanu), șoseaua Kiseleff. The street is now named strada Gheorghe Brătianu. The villa is located at No. 26, on a small square called Rondul Francis. (Note: pages 111-112, 125, 138, 141-143, and 204.) Two photographs of the house were published in the journal Arhitectura in 1930. (Note: Toma T. Socolescu, Vila Ionescu – Șos. Kiseleff, photographs, 1930, year VI, pages 37-38.) A small pavilion with a roof, built atop the tower, is now missing, probably due to the 1940 and 1977 earthquakes. The house is classified as a historical monument.

=== Other counties ===
==== Public Buildings and Religious buildings ====
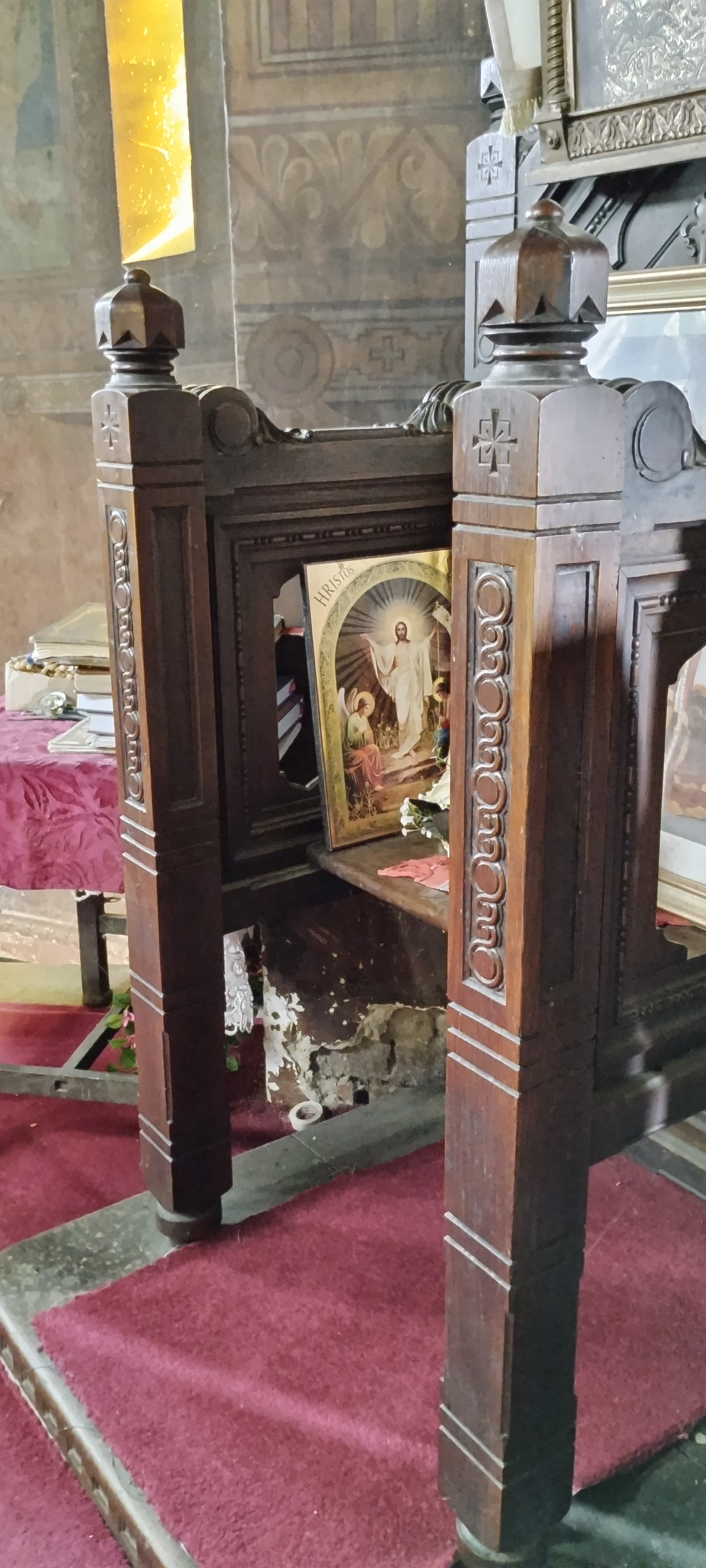

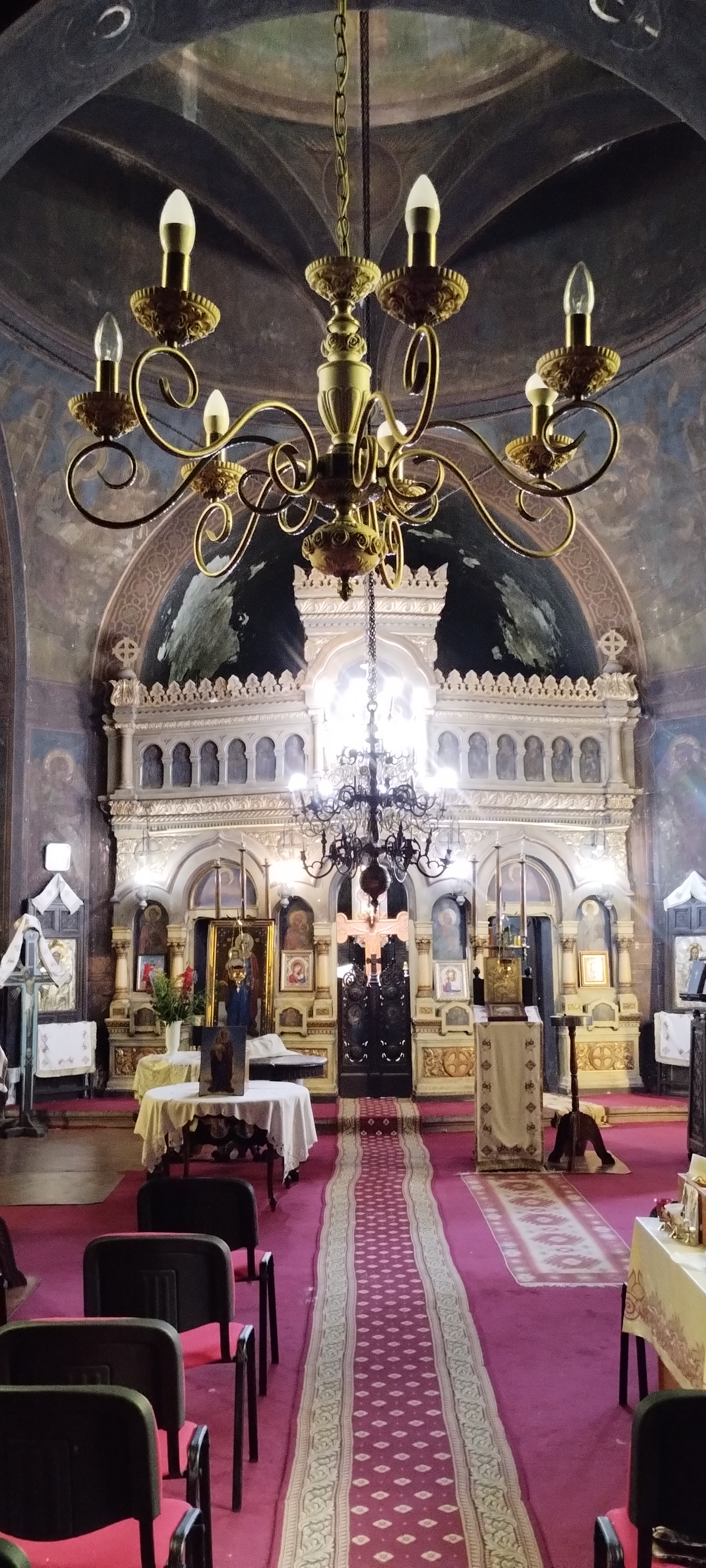

- St. Nicholas and Alexander Church (Sfântul Nicolae și Alexandru) in Netezești, a commune in Ilfov County, built in Neo-Romanian style, located on strada Principală, near the Town Hall. (Note: pages 178-179, 180, and 203.) The construction and interior fittings were completed between 1912 and 1916.
  The church of Netezești, a religious foundation of the Al. Serghiescu family, was built at the expense of Madame Al. Serghiescu under quite good conditions and even with a certain luxury, both in terms of construction and furniture, as well as the paintings executed under the direction of the painter Pavlu, with numerous young painters of remarkable talent, including Tonitza, St. Dumitrescu, Schweitzer-Cumpănă, Bălțatu, who was only 16 years old at the time, and others. (Note: Translation from Romanian of a note by Toma T. Socolescu, taken from his memoirs. The note (No. 30) appears at the bottom of page 53. The text (to which the note refers) indicates that architect and painter Toma Gheorghe Tomescu was still working on the church furniture in 1916.)
  The oak furniture (Note: page 180.) was exhibited at the Romanian Athenaeum during an exhibition organized by the architect in 1916. (Note: page 53.) The frescoes and interior paintings were completed in 1932. The church is classified as a historical monument. In 2022, it was moved from the "B" list to the "A" list of Romanian historical monuments. Being in an advanced state of deterioration, its restoration began in 2023 under the guidance of Father Rizea, who fought for over 30 years not only to have the monument moved to the "A" list but also to secure the necessary funding for many preservation or restoration actions that were required.
- Boys' High School in Buftea (Ilfov County). Built between 1929 and 1934. (Note: pages 158-159, 165-166, 197, and 204.) It is located at strada liceului No. 5. Its exact name (as of 2009) is Barbu Știrbei Buftea Economic High School.

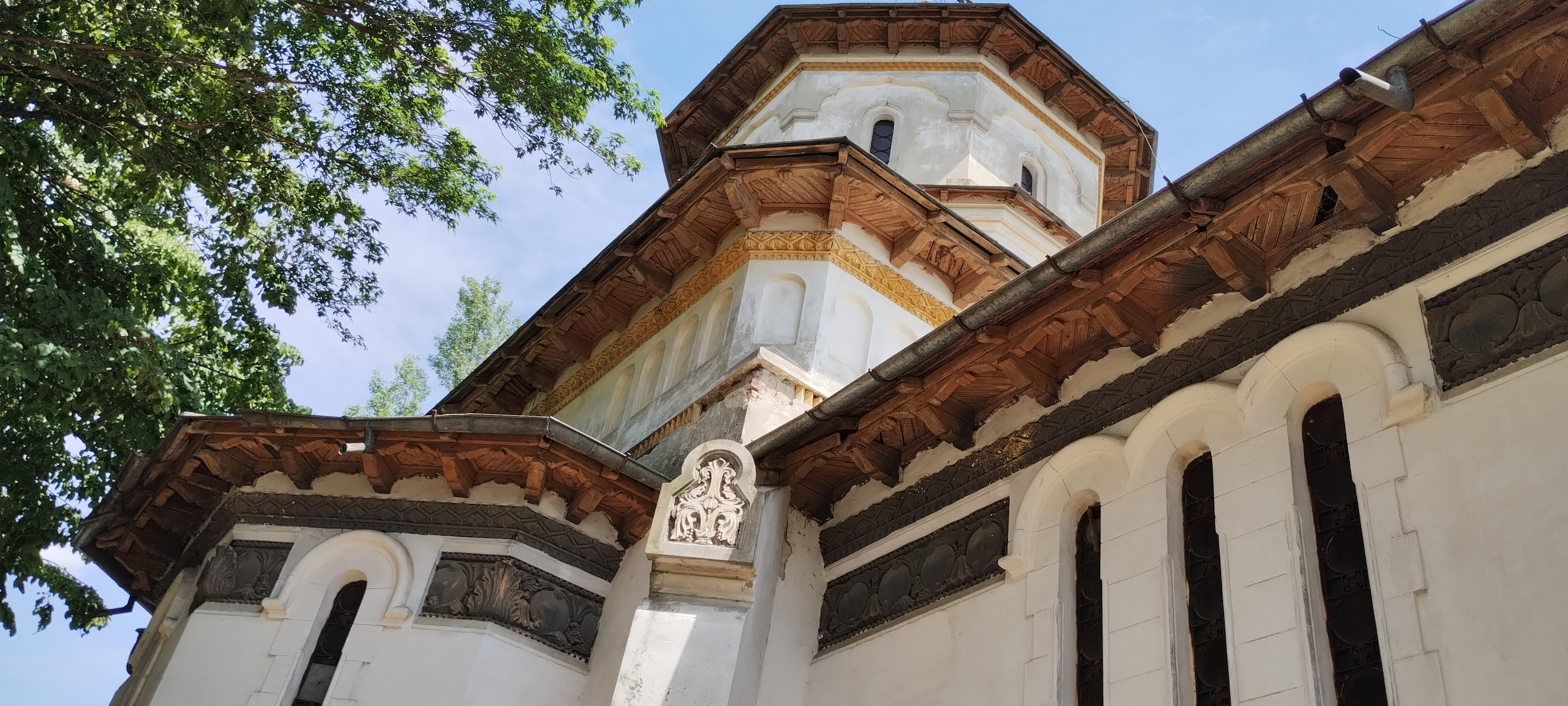

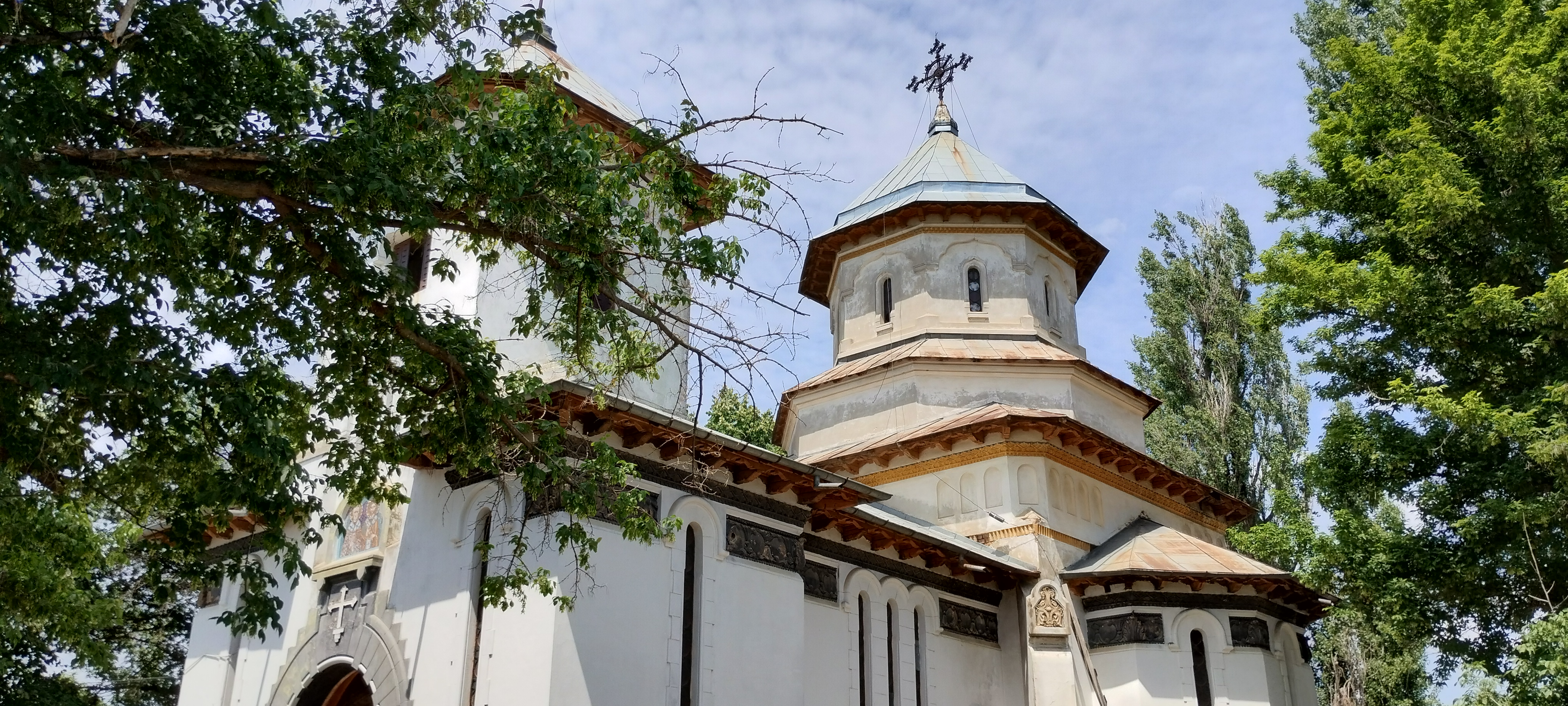

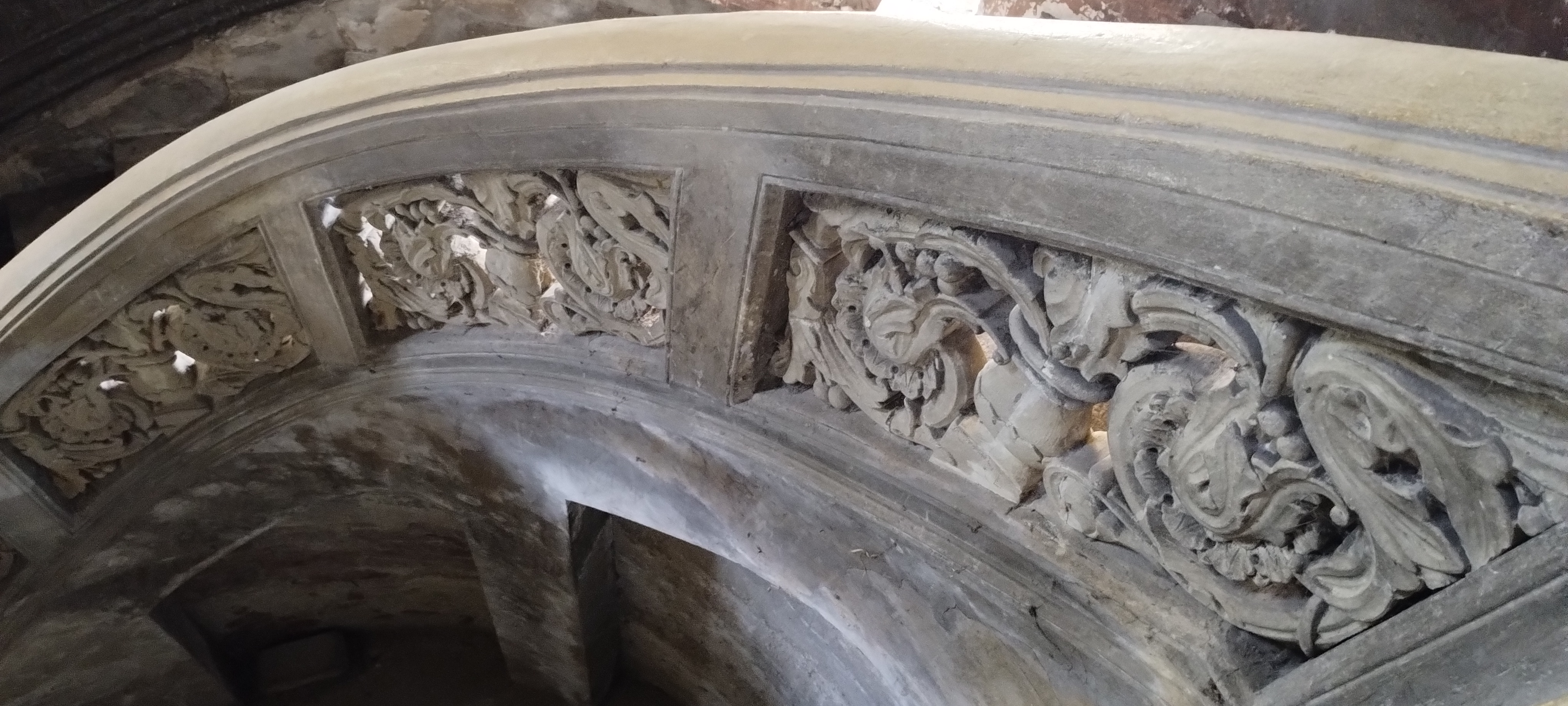

St. Nicholas and Alexander Church in Netezești.

== Architectural works designed but not executed ==
Among the ten competitions won by the architect, only two were executed: the Creditul Prahovei and, partially, the Palace of the Chamber of Commerce and Industry, both located in Ploiești. In addition, numerous projects were never realized, including the following:

- Project for the institute of south-east European studies, under the direction of professor Nicolae Iorga, in Bucharest, probably in the 1930s. (Note: pages 7 and 31.)
- Project for a church in the town of Slănic (Prahova), designed during the summer of 1913 and exhibited at the Romanian Athenaeum in Bucharest in the spring of 1916. (Note: pages 178 and 203.) It was published in the journal Arhitectura in 1920. (Note: Toma T. Socolescu, Proect de biserică / Comuna Slănic-Prahova, article and plans, January 1920, pages 21 and 24.)
- Project for a public garden on Piață Unirii in Ploiești, offered free of charge by the architect to the city in 1922. mayor Ion Georgescu Obrocea selected the plans of another architect. the garden was inaugurated in 1926.
- Project for a wholesale market hall (halle en gros) for Ploiești, conceived behind the Central Market Halls in 1936.
- Project for a Palace of Culture for Ploiești, in 1937. (Note: pages 326 and 504.) The building called "Palace of culture" since 1953 is in fact the former palace of justice built by architects Toma T. Socolescu and Ernest Doneaud.
- Church projects for the town of Predeal (around 1956), with his son Toma Barbu Socolescu, (Note: pages 193, 205 and 206.) as well as for the commune of Păulești in 1944.
- Project for the town hall of Făgăraș.

== Publications ==
=== Books ===
- Toma T. Socolescu (2004). Amintiri [Memories] (in Romanian). Bucharest: Caligraf Design. ISBN 973-86771-0-6.
- Toma T. Socolescu (2004). Fresca arhitecților care au lucrat în România în epoca modernă 1800 - 1925 [Fresco of architects who worked in Romania in the modern era 1800 - 1925] (in Romanian). Bucharest: Editura Caligraf Design. ISBN 973-86771-1-4.
- Nicolae Iorga (1938). Preface. Arhitectura în Ploești, studiu istoric [Architecture in Ploești, historical study]. By Toma T. Socolescu (in Romanian). Vol. reference: 16725. Bucharest: Cartea Românească. The book contains many of the chapters written (by the architect) for Ploești's monograph by Mihail Sevastos.
- Mihail Sevastos (1937). Monografia orașului Ploești [Monograph of the City of Ploiești] (in Romanian). Bucharest: Cartea Românească. Toma T. Socolescu is one of the authors of the monograph. He wrote the chapters on architecture, the central market halls, urban planning, the history of the city’s maps, as well as popular culture (visual artists, museums, and the 'Nicolae Iorga' library). The book also includes many of his drawings and watercolors.
- Toma T. Socolescu (1923). Prin Ardeal, note de drum ale unui arhitect [En Transylvanie, Notes de voyage d'un architecte] (in Romanian). Ploești: Biblioteca România viitoare / Cartea Românească. "With illustrations by the architect. The travel account is also fully included in his memoirs Amintiri, pages 96–104 of the book published by Caligraf"
- Toma T. Socolescu (1927). "introductive study". Urbanism la îndemâna tuturor: pentru uzul consilierilor comunali și județeni, arhitecților, inginerilor, medicilor, ofițerilor, agronomilor și al tuturor persoanelor ce se interesează de mai buna stare a orașului [Urbanism at hand: For the use of municipal and county councilors, architects, engineers, doctors, officers, agronomists, and all those concerned with the better state of the city]. By Jean Raymond. Biblioteca Urbanistică (in Romanian). Translated by Toma T. Socolescu. Ploești: Editura municipiului Ploiești: Cartea Românească.
- Toma T. Socolescu (1932). "introductive study". Igiena urbană [L'hygiène urbaine]. By Paul Juillerat. Biblioteca Urbanistică (in Romanian). Translated by Toma T. Socolescu. Vălenii de Munte: Editura municipiului Ploiești: Datina Romanească., (Note: note 49 - page 93.) sous le titre roumain: Igiena urbană, Paul Juillerat, collection Biblioteca Urbanistică, Editura municipiului Ploiești: Cartea Românească, 1927
- Toma T. Socolescu (1953–1956). Monografia Ioan Mincu Profesor Arhitect 1851-1912 [Monograph of Ioan Mincu, Architect Professor 1851-1912]. Biblioteca Urbanistică (in Romanian). Vol. I and II. Bucharest: Editura municipiului Ploiești: Datina Romanească. "The second volume is dedicated to illustrations (photographs) and consists of 69 pages"

=== Articles and drawings ===
- In the Buletinul Comisiunii Monumentelor Istorice (BCMI), three important articles:
1. Saint Nicholas Church (Sfântul Nicolae) in Bălteni, archaeological studies and surveys. Published in 1908 in the first issue (3rd trimester), under the title "Architectural Notes", pages 114-119.
2. Casa Hagi Prodan in Ploiești, archaeological studies and surveys. Published in 1916, in the last issue published before the war. The article was also published in his book Arhitectura în Ploești, studiu istoric pages 16–21. Having suffered from the bombings of 1944, the house was restored and the museum re-inaugurated on 1 May 1953.
3. Casa Dobrescu in Ploiești, a typical house of merchants and small industrialists from the early 19th century, archaeological studies and surveys. Published in 1926, pages 112, 188, 199, and 204. The house became the Ion L. Caragiale Museum on 30 January 1962.
- (in Romanian) In the journal Arhitectura, from 1916 to 1944:
1. Numerous articles on Romanian architectures, illustrated as well as his own plans and photographs of completed works. (Note: including an article on the project of the communal palace by Ion Mincu, in the 1925 issue, year IV, pages 6-8; as well as a long response to a critique of his architectural theory appearing in the journal Simetria, in the 1943-1944 issue, years IX-X, pages 73-75.)
2. Portraits of deceased architects including Ion N. Socolescu, Alexandre Clavel, Dimitrie Herjeu, Toma N. Socolescu and Constantin Nănescu. (Note: Toma T. Socolescu, Ioan N. Socolescu, in memoriam article, 1924, year III, page 146.; Toma T. Socolescu, A. Clavel. Câteva note, in memoriam article, 1925, year IV, pages 14-15.; Toma T. Socolescu, La mormântul lui Dimitrie Herjeu, in memoriam article, 1926, year V, pages 7-8.; Toma T. Socolescu, Ion N. Socolescu, in memoriam article, January–March 1941, year VII, pages 58-60.; Toma T. Socolescu, Toma N. Socolescu, in memoriam article, January–March 1941, year VII, page 58.; Toma T. Socolescu, Constantin Nănescu, article Mortea arhitectului Constantin Nănescu, January–March 1943-1944, years IX-X, page 59.)
3. Note de drum (Travel notes in Italy). An illustrated article of 7 pages in the issue of 1925, pages 30–36.
4. Drawings and watercolors of old Romanian houses. (Note: In the following issues: Watercolors of a church project in Slănic, side façade, plan and main façade, 1920, year II, issues 1,2, pages 12 and 24.; Watercolors of peasant houses in Bessarabia, Old Romanian houses in Chișinău, 1926, year V, page 98.; An article dedicated to old Romanian art in Bessarabia, illustrated on several pages by his own watercolors of old houses in Bessarabia and Wallachia, two issues of 1941, years VII and VIII, pages 122-124.)
5. Toma T. Socolescu (1941). "Principii și îndreptări. Către o arhitectură românească modernă" [Principles and Orientations. Towards a Modern Romanian Architecture]. Arhitectura (in French) (2 April–June - year VII). Bucharest: SAR: 17–18. A profession of faith in which the author defends the idea of an art concerned with preserving the national cultural wealth and the Romanian national genius, while pursuing progress and modernity. The architect rejects any idea of international architecture. He published this article in French the same year.
6. An article defending the idea of creating an Institute dedicated to the protection and development of Romanian architecture: "A Romanian Architecture Institute", in the issue of 1943-1944. (Note: Toma T. Socolescu Un institut de Arhitectură românească, article, 1943-1944, years IX-X, pages 5-6.)

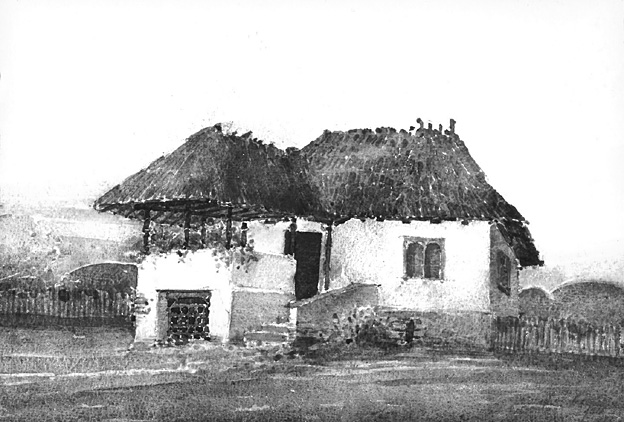
Watercolor by Toma T. Socolescu - Old house in Ploiești as it existed until the early 20th century.

- (in Romanian) In the journal Simetria: an article on Romanian architects who studied at the Beaux-Arts de Paris.
- (in Romanian) In the journal România Viitoare:
1. Travel notes on Romania and Italy.
2. Literary articles on the Countess de Noailles (Brâncoveanu), Auguste Rodin, Octavian Goga, etc.
3. Studies on some old buildings and historic monuments of Ploiești, including:

- An article on the ruins of the old Saint Nicholas Church (Sfântul Nicolae Vechi), located at 105 strada Mihai Bravu, in 1915 (Note: page 149.)
- An article on an old house, in the style of the Hagi Prodan residence, located on strada Ștefan cel Mare, opposite the Saints Voivodes Church (Sfînṭii Voevozi), in 1915. The church is located at number 23.

- (France) Toma T. Socolescu (1941). "Vers une architecture roumaine moderne". Bulletin de l'École Polytechnique de Bucarest (Bulletin publié en français) (in French). Extrait (1 et 2, année XII). Bucarest: Tipărire Finanțe Si Industrie.
- On the specific subject of the Central Market Halls, the masterpiece of Toma T. Socolescu, several articles have appeared in Romanian journals and newspapers as well as in various European reviews:

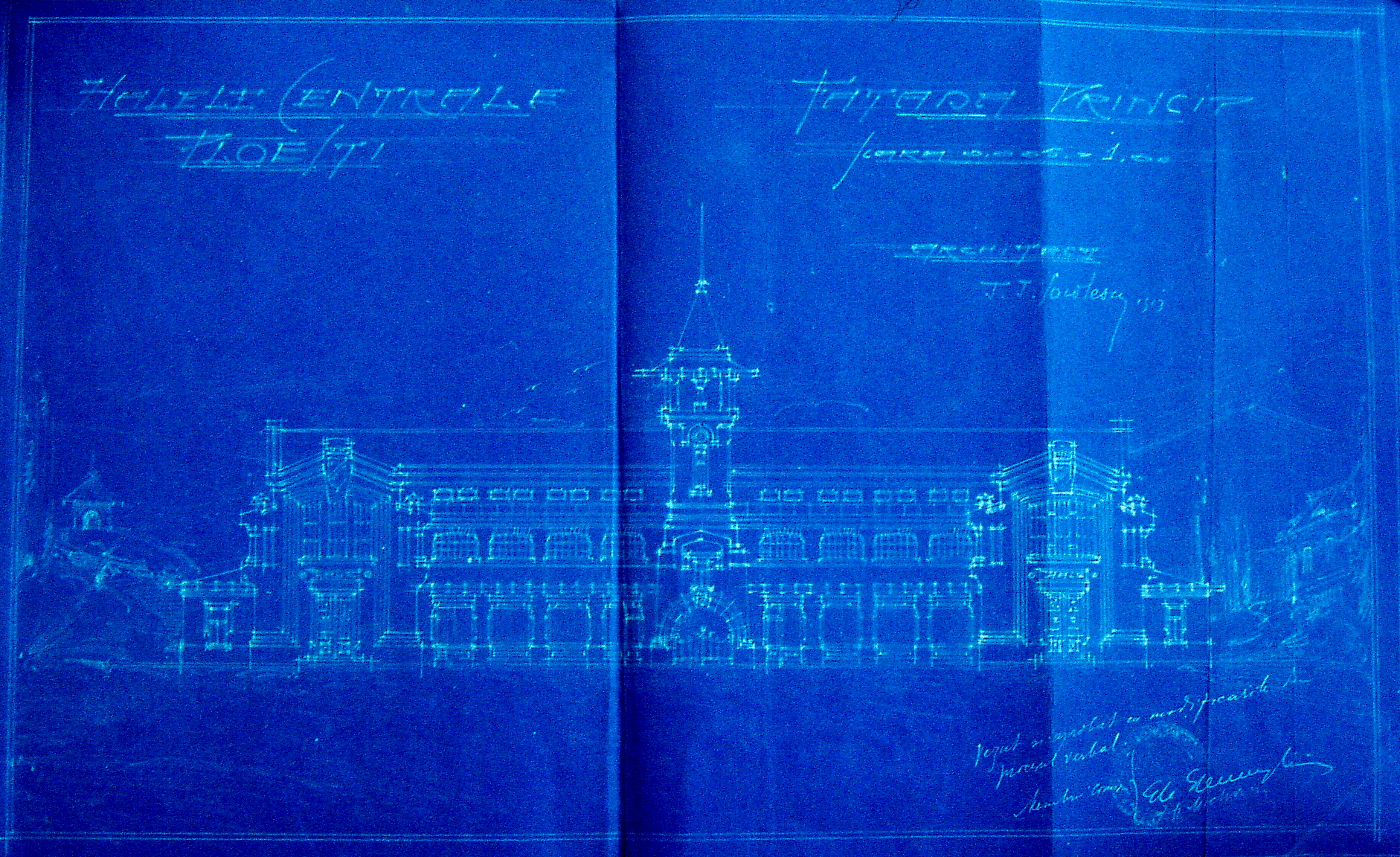
Preliminary project (1913) by Toma T. Socolescu for the Central Market Halls of Ploiești.

1. (in Romanian) Romania: a lengthy article in the newspaper Urbanismul, two issues of the review Arhitectura, and other publications:
  1. Toma T. Socolescu (November–December 1932). "Halele orașului Ploești" [The Market Halls of the City of Ploești] (PDF). Urbanismul (in Romanian). year 9 (11–12). Bucharest: Institutul Urbanistic al României: 373–378.
  2. In the journal Arhitectura: Toma T. Socolescu, Halele Centrale ale orașului Ploești, five interior and exterior photographs of the halls, 1931–1933, pages 40–41 and page 86; and Toma T. Socolescu, Halele Centrale Ploești, article, plans, drawings and photographs, July 1936, number 6, pages 13–16 and pages 21–30. The July 1936 issue article is reproduced in full on pages 597–603 of the Monografia orașului Ploești by Mihail Sevastos as well as on pages 96–101 of the book Arhitectura în Ploești, studiu istoric written by Toma T. Socolescu.
  3. In the newspaper Ploieștii, an article entitled "The Construction of the Market Halls", written on 21 April 1929, concerning a legal dispute over the construction contract of the halls; in 1936, also in Ploieștii, a long article regarding the publication of an article in the French review La Techniques des Travaux, published the same year.
  4. In the journal Revista Veterinară, an article.
2. France: Three illustrated studies on the Central Market Halls of Ploiești written in French by the architect himself.
  1. T. T. Socolesco, architect (November 1936). "Les Halles Centrales de Ploesti (Roumanie)". L'Architecture d'Aujourd'hui (in French). year 7 (11). Paris: 44–45.
  2. T. T. Socolesco, architect (August 1936). "Les Halles Centrales de Ploesti (Roumanie)". La Techniques des Travaux (in French). year 12 (8). Paris: 413–417.
  3. T. T. Socolesco, Architect, Professor at the Academy of Architects of Bucharest (September 1936). "Les Halles Centrales de Ploesti en Roumanie". La Construction Moderne (in French). year 51 (46). Paris: 945–955.
3. United Kingdom: The Architect, London.
4. Germany: Rudolf Saliger; Dr. Ing. Friedrich V. Baravalle (26 May 1933). "Die neue grossmarkthalle in Ploiesti" [The new central market hall in Ploiesti]. Der Bauingenieur (in French). 14 Jahrgang (Heft 21-22). Berlin: 282–284.
- (in Romanian) Moreover, he published, and was the subject of, numerous articles in newspapers from Ploiești, Iași and Bucharest, on topics related to architecture, but also on urban planning, on local politics, on art and culture, on transportation, even agriculture, as well as obituaries.

== Bibliography ==
- George D. Florescu (1941–1942). "Un sfetnic al lui Matei Basarab, ginerele lui Mihai Viteazul" [A counsellor of Matei Basarab, the son-in-law of Michael the Brave] (PDF). Revista Istorică Română (in Romanian) (XI–XII). Bucharest: Imprimeria Națională: 66–94.
- (in Romanian) Books and publications by Toma T. Socolescu, including Amintiri, Fresca arhitecților care au lucrat în România în epoca modernă 1800 - 1925, and Arhitectura în Ploești, studiu istoric.
- (in Romanian) Mihail Sevastos (1937). Monografia orașului Ploești [Monograph of the City of Ploiești] (in Romanian). Bucharest: Cartea Românească. "The architect is one of the authors of the monograph. Socolescu wrote the chapters dedicated to architecture, the central market halls, urban planning, the history of the city's layout plans, as well as popular culture (visual artists, museums, and the "Nicolae Iorga" library). The book also includes many of his drawings and watercolors.".
- (in Romanian) Journal Arhitectura, published by the SOCIETY OF ROMANIAN ARCHITECTS, Bucharest, issued from 1906 to 1944
- (in Romanian) Gabriela Petrescu (2024). ARHITECȚII SOCOLESCU 1840-1940, Studiu monografic [The Socolescu Architects 1840–1940, A Monographic Study] (in Romanian). Bucharest: Editura Simetria. ISBN 978-973-1872-55-1.
- (France) Carmen Popescu (2004). Le Style national roumain - Construire une nation à travers l'architecture 1881-1945 [The Romanian National Style – Nation Building through Architecture 1881–1945] (in French). Rennes: Presses universitaires de Rennes – Simetria. ISBN 2-86847-913-8.
- (in Romanian) Zina Macri; Ionuț Macri (2011–2013). Toma T. Socolescu arhitect român 1883-1960 [Toma T. Socolescu, Romanian Architect 1883–1960] (in Romanian) (2nd ed.). Bucharest: Caligraf and "Ion Mincu" University Press. ISBN 978-606-638-062-1.
- (in Romanian) Lucian Vasile (2016). Orașul sacrificat. Al Doilea Război Mondial la Ploiești [The Sacrificed City: The Second World War in Ploiești] (in Romanian) (2nd ed.). Ploiești: Asociatia pentru Educatie si Dezvoltare Urbana. ISBN 978-973-0-21379-9.
- (in Romanian) Constantin Ilie (2005). Comuna Păulești Județul Prahova - Scurtă monografie [Short Monograph of the Commune of Păulești, Prahova County] (PDF) (in Romanian). Ploiești: Editura Ploiești Milenium III. ISBN 973-87051-3-4.
- (in Romanian) Trestioreanu, Constantin; Marinică, Gheorghe (2003). Bisericile din Ploiești, I Bisericile ortodoxe [Churches of Ploiești, I orthodox Churches] (in Romanian). Ploiești: Editura Ploiești Milenium III. ISBN 973-85670-4-1.
- (in Romanian) Cristian Petru Bălan (2007). Monografia orașului Boldești-Scăieni [Monograph of the city of Boldești-Scăieni] (in Romanian). Ploiești: Editura Premier. ISBN 978-973-740-062-8.
- (in Romanian) Marian Macovei (2011). Monografia Blejoi [Monograph of the Commune of Blejoi] (PDF) (in Romanian). Blejoi.
- (in Romanian) Vincent G. Duqué; Paul D. Popescu (2006). Gérard Joseph Duqué, traversandu-și epoca (1866-1956) [Gérard Joseph Duqué, Crossing his era (1866–1956)] (in Romanian). Ploiești: Editura Ploiești Milenium III. ISBN 973-87924-5-2. "book on the life of Gérard Joseph Duqué"
- Lucia Hossu-Longin (2012). Memorialul Durerii, o istorie care nu se învață la școală (documentary). Memorialul durerii: Memorialul Bucureştilor - Curcubeul negru – demolarea cartierului Uranus (in Romanian). TVR Cultural. "The Memorial of Suffering - A TVR documentary on the destruction of Bucharest carried out by dictator Ceaușescu, focusing on the Uranus district - 43min".
- Lucia Hossu-Longin (2012). Memorialul Durerii, o istorie care nu se învață la școală (documentary). Memorialul durerii: Memorialul Bucureștilor - cartierele din zona Uranus-Puișor-Dealul Spirii (in Romanian). TVR Cultural. "The Memorial of Suffering - A TVR documentary on the destruction of Bucharest carried out by dictator Ceaușescu, focusing on the Uranus, Puișor, and Dealul Spirii districts - 45min".

== Other sources ==
- (in Romanian) Prahova County Department of the Romanian National Archives.
- (in Romanian) Official documents from Romanian institutions, including the official Romanian newspaper (Monitorul Oficial).
- (in Romanian) Library of the Ion Mincu University of Architecture and Urban Planning.
- (France) and (Romania) Socolescu family archives (Paris, Bucarest) including a photographic collection.
- (in Romanian) Lucian Vasile, Historian, Senior Advisor at the National Council for the Study of the Securitate Archives (CNSAS) since 2025, former Expert and head of department at the Institute for the Investigation of Communist Crimes and the Memory of the Romanian Exile (IICCMER), president of the Association for Education and Urban Development (AEDU), author of the specialized site on the city of Ploiești and its history: RepublicaPloiesti.net.
- (in Romanian) Constantin Ilie, civil and industrial construction engineer in Ploiești, technical construction expert for 35 years. Born on 18 March 1929, in Păulești, Mr. Ilie personally knew Toma T. Socolescu and studied his work from 2004 until his death in 2024.
- (Belgium) and (Romania) Vincent Gérard Duqué, grandson of Gérard Joseph Duqué, in Ploiești. Mr. Duqué’s grandfather was a friend of the architect. Both were active members of the city’s Rotary Club.

== Notes and references ==
- (a) (in Romanian) Toma T. Socolescu, Arhitectura în Ploești, studiu istoric, Editura: Cartea Românească, București, preface by Nicolae Iorga, 1938, 111 pages, reference: 16725. Also in (in Romanian) Mihai Sevastos Monografia orașului Ploești.
- (b) (in Romanian) Toma T. Socolescu, Memoirs of Toma T. Socolescu and book of Toma T. Socolescu: Amintiri, Editura Caligraf Design, Bucharest, 2004, 1 volume, 237 pages.
- (c) (in Romanian) Mihail Sevastos, Monografia orașului Ploești, Editura: Cartea Românească, (in Romanian), 1938, 905 pages.
- (d) (in Romanian) Society of Romanian Architects (SAR), architecture journal Arhitectura, published from 1906 to 1944.
- (e) (in Romanian) Gabriela Petrescu, architect in Bucharest, ARHITECȚII SOCOLESCU 1840-1940, Studiu monografic, Editura Simetria, Bucharest, 2024, 1 vol., 232 pages, ISBN 978-973-1872-55-1.
- (f) (in Romanian) RepublicaPloiesti.net, Lucian Vasile, historien, Président de l'Association pour l'Éducation et le Développement Urbain (AEDU), Créateur (août 2009) et auteur du site consacré au passé de la ville et à son architecture.
- (g) (in Romanian) Zina Macri et Ionuț Macri, Toma T. Socolescu arhitect român 1883-1960, Caligraf - Bucarest, 2011 and Editura Universitară „Ion Mincu" - Bucharest, 2013, 1 vol., 264 pages, 2011: ISBN 978-973-86771-6-6 and 2013: ISBN 978-606-638-062-1.
- (h) (in Romanian) Nicolae Dumitrescu and Constantin Ilie, Columne peste timp Profesor-arhitect Toma T. Socolescu - 1883-1960, Editura Ploiesti-Mileniul III, 2010, ISBN 978-9731797-24-3
- Other references:
