= Toma Barbu Socolescu =

Toma Gheorghe Barbu Socolescu
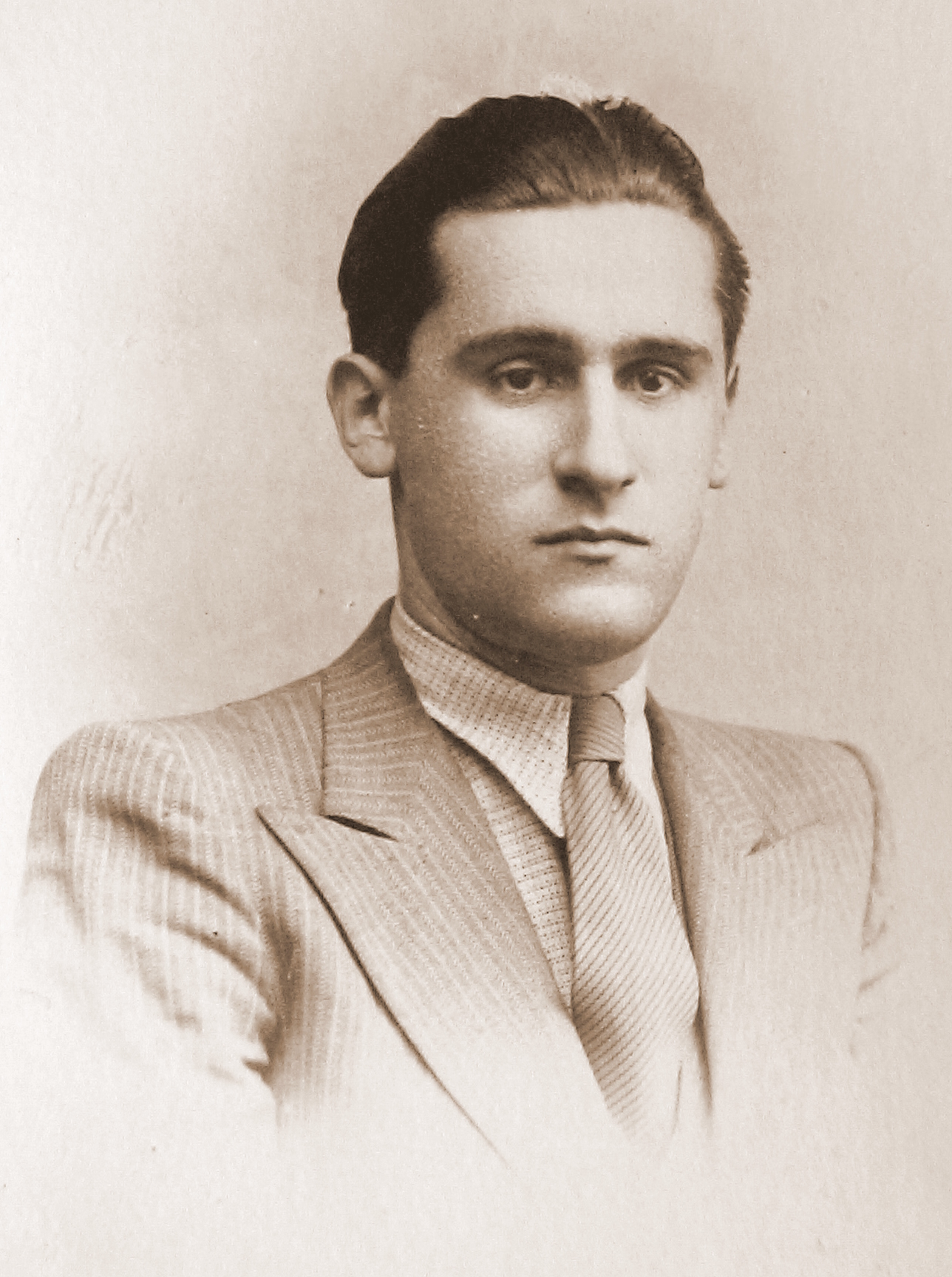
- Toma Barbu Socolescu, around 1930.
- Born: July 10, 1910; Ploiești, Kingdom of Romania
- Died: July 21, 1977 (aged 67); Bucharest, Socialist Republic of Romania
- Resting place: Bellu Cemetery, Bucharest
- Other name: Barbu Socolescu
- Citizenship: (Romania) romanian
- Education: École nationale supérieure des Beaux-Arts
- Occupation: Architect
- Years active: 1932–1969
- Spouse: Irena Gabriela Vasilescu
- Children: Mihai Ștefan Marc Socolescu
- Father: Toma T. Socolescu
- Relatives: Toma N. Socolescu (grand-father), Ion N. Socolescu (great-uncle)
- Awards: Paul Delaon Prize, 1st mention (1938); Prize from the State Commission for Architecture and Construction for a canning factory in Ovidiu 1964
- Buildings: Ovidiu canning factory (later Pepsi-Cola)
- Design: Art deco, Functionalism

Toma Gheorghe Barbu Socolescu (born July 10, 1909, in Ploiești, Romania, and died July 21, 1977, in Bucharest, Romania) was a Romanian architect, son of Toma T. Socolescu and grandson of Toma N. Socolescu. A functionalist against his will, he was compelled to conform to the directives of communist Romania.

== Biography ==
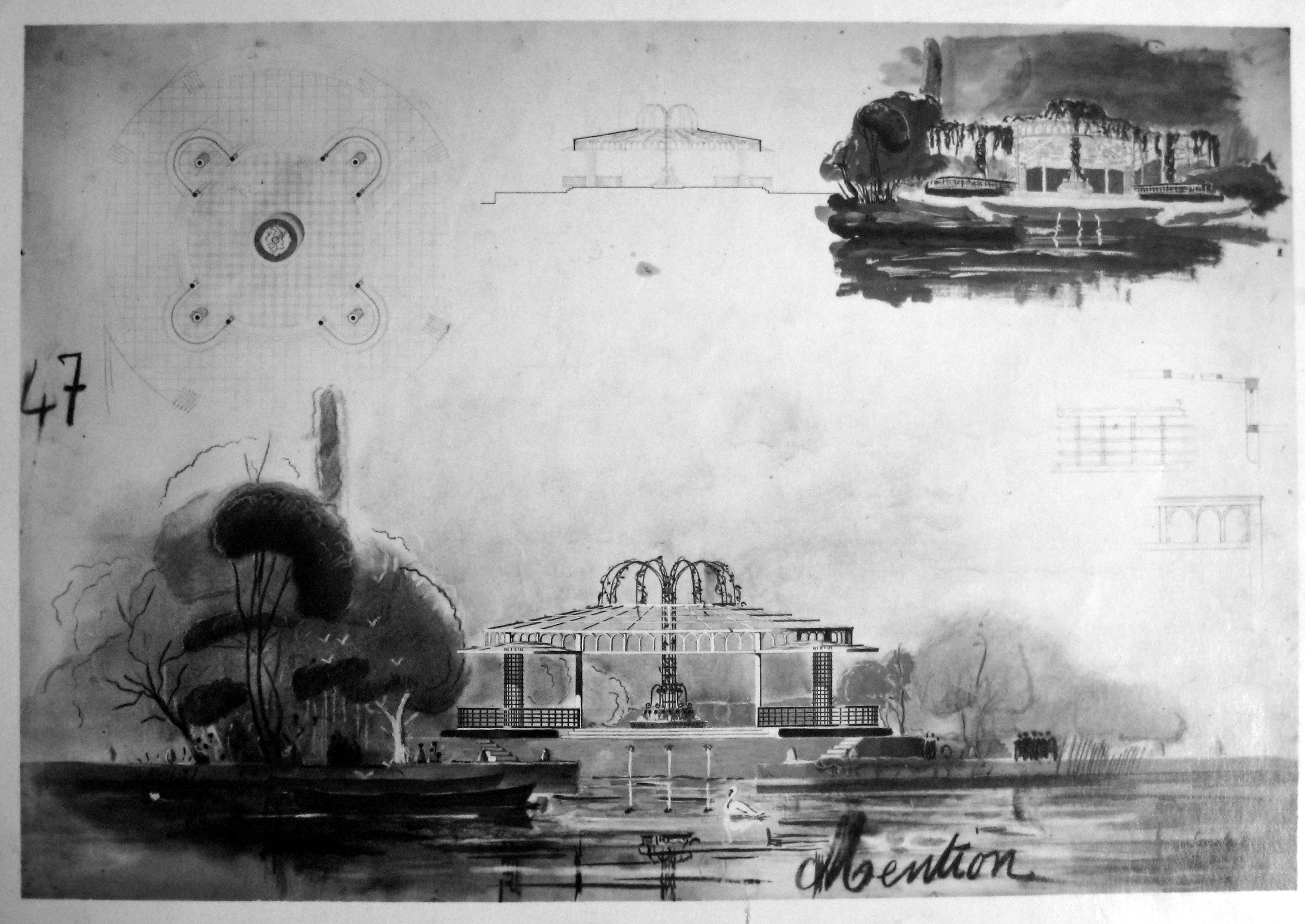
Drawing of Toma Barbu Socolescu (fontains) – 1st mention at Delaon Prize in 1938.

He was awarded two third-place medals, in construction and ornamental drawing, and later, in the first class from November 4, 1936, he received a second-place medal for a rendered project.

Graduated in architecture from the École nationale supérieure des beaux-arts of Paris in 1939, he was admitted to the 2nd class on July 10, 1934, winning two 3rd medals in construction and ornamental design, then to the 1st class on November 4, 1936, winning a 2nd medal for a submitted design. Before and during his studies, Toma Barbu Socolescu worked on the interior design of the transatlantic liner Normandie in 1932-1935 (Note: p. 192.) in Roger-Henri Expert's studio.

His first steps were taken alongside his father Toma T. Socolescu, in the 1940s, with whom he worked on several projects in the Prahova Judet: plans for a locomotive depot in Ploiești as well as the urban development plans for Câmpina and Mizil. (Note: p. 193.) His first position was as a university assistant at the Ion Mincu Institute of Architecture (Bucharest) in 1939, a post he held until 1951. According to his statement in his registration file with the Directorate of Higher Education in 1940, he was then serving a 12-month term in the Romanian army with the rank of second lieutenant.

He made his entire career in industrial architecture and large civilian buildings. (Note: Obituary of the architect, published in the 1977 issue, page 8.) From 1942 to 1945, he was Design Architect at the C.A.M (Cassa Autonomă a Monopolurilor Regatului României), a position he would still assume from 1949 to 1951 at the IPC (Institute of Design and Construction). From 1952 to 1958, he was chief design architect at the Institute of Design for Industrial Constructions (IPCI), while also working externally for the Ministry of Local Economy, building canteens, housing and administrative pavilions. He pursued his expertise as chief design architect at the Institute of Design for Petroleum Refineries or Institutul de Proiectari pentru Instalatii Petroliere (IPIP SA) from 1958 to 1960. Finally, from 1960 to 1967, he worked as a consultant architect at the Institute of Design for Food Industries (IPIA) or Institutul de Proiectare al Industriei Alimentare. He ended his career as a professor at the Technical School of Architecture and Town Building (Școala Tehnică de Arhitectură și Construcția Orașelor) of Bucharest, from 1967 to 1970.

Barbu Socolescu built a number of industrial projects, including a large-scale canning factory at Ovidiu near Constanța, from 1959 to 1965, a site which would later house the country's first Pepsi-Cola plant.

Also a painter, he exhibited his watercolors at an exhibition organized by the Union of Architects of the Socialist Republic of Romania in Bucharest in 1954.

Toma Barbu's career was more modest than his abilities would have suggested, as his family suffered political persecution. The Romanian political police monitored him for much of his career, as they did his father. He was prosecuted for hostile expressions against the State and summoned several times by the Securitate. As he was not considered a danger to the regime, no further action was taken.

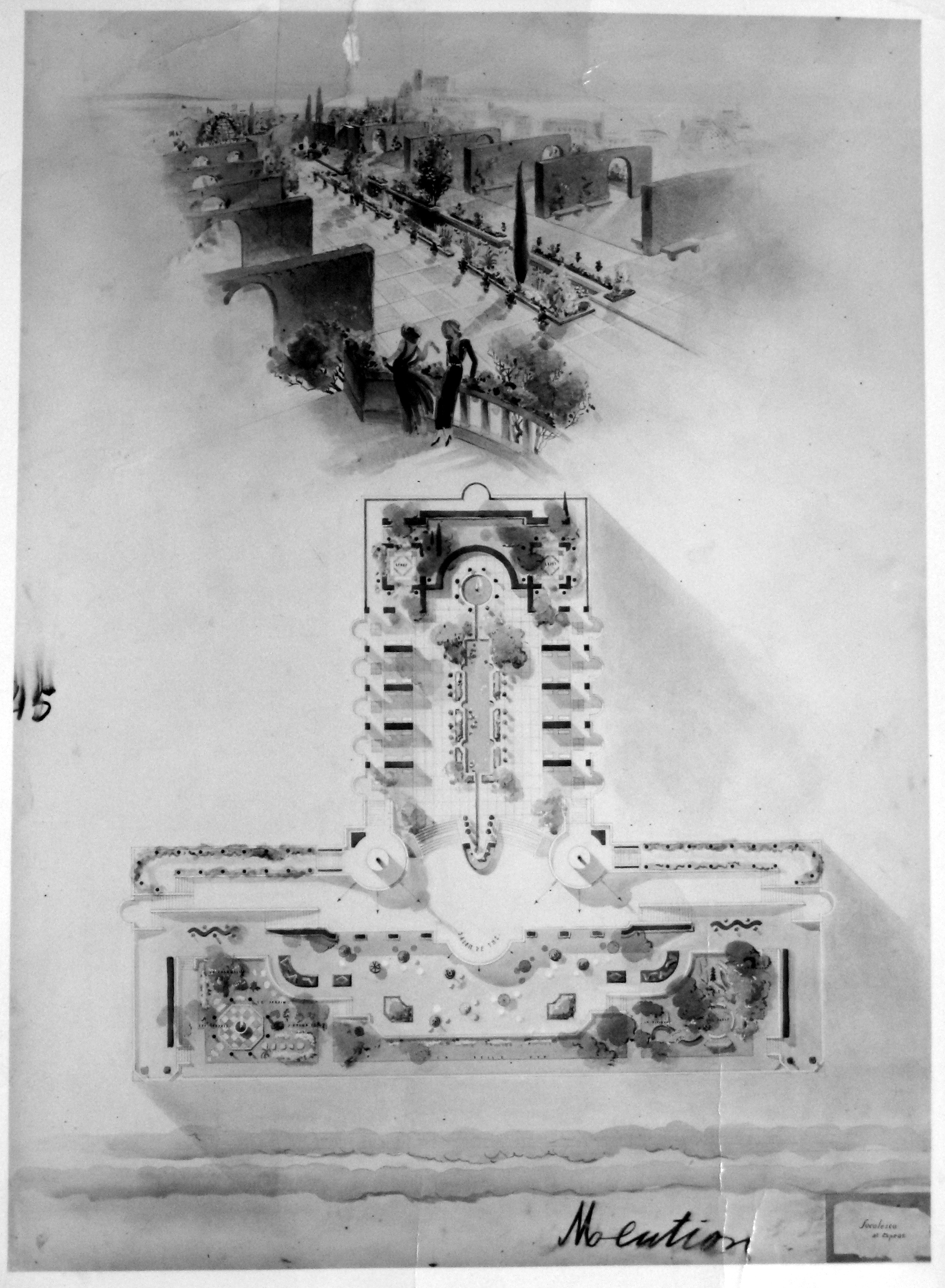
Drawing of Toma Barbu Socolescu (gardens) - 1st mention at Delaon Prize in 1938.

=== Architectural contests ===
1. 1937: First prize for the sketch competition on a casino project decided by the Astra Română rafinery, in Ploiești, co-designed with his father Toma T. Socolescu. (Note: pp. 186, 192-193, 205 and 206.)
2. April 1938: 1st mention at concours Paul Delaon, Paris.
3. 1943: Mention in the competition for the administrative grouping of UCEA factories in Făgăraş. (Note: Arhitectura journal, Grupul administrativ al fabricilor UCEA, 1943-1944, years IX-X, p. 31.)
4. 1964: Award of the Architecture and Building State Commission for the canned vegetables factory of Ovidiu, Constanța County. (Note: (in Romanian) Arhitectura RPR journal, Arh Barbu Socolescu, Fabrica de conserve Ovidiu din Constanta, 1964, year XII, Nr2, pp. 5-7.)

=== Memberships ===
He was a member of several groups of architects:

- Student and alumni association of the Paris École nationale et supérieure des Beaux-arts or Grande Masseof the School of Fine Arts since 1932.
- Société des Architectes Diplômés par le Gouvernement Français since 1939.
- Society of Certified Architects and Corporation of Romanian Architects in 1939.
- Society of Romanian Architects from 1939 to 1946.
- Architects Union of Romanian Socialist Republic since 1953.

=== Genealogy ===
The Socol family of Berivoiul-Mare, formerly part of Făgăraș or Țara Făgărașului is a branch of the Socol family of Muntenia, which lived in the county of Dâmbovița. A 'Socol', great boyar and son-in-law of Mihai Viteazul (1557–1601), had two religious foundations in Dâmbovița county, still existing, Cornești and Răzvadu de Sus. He built their churches and another one in the suburb of Târgoviște. This boyar married Marula, daughter of Tudora din Popești, also known as Tudora din Târgșor, sister of Prince Antonie-Vodă. Marula was recognized by Mihai Viteazul as his illegitimate daughter, following an extra-marital liaison with Tudora. Marula is buried in the church of Răzvadu de Sus, where, on a richly carved stone slab, her name can be read.

Nicolae Iorga, the great Romanian historian and friend of Barbu's father Toma T. Socolescu, found Socol ancestors among the founders of the City of Făgăraș in the 12th century. (Note: Note 8 - p. 15.) In 1655, the Prince of Transylvania George II Rákóczi ennobled an ancestor of Nicolae G. Socol: "Ștefan Boier din Berivoiul Mare, and through him his wife Sofia Spătar, his son Socoly, and their heirs and descendants of whatever sex, to be treated and regarded as true and undeniable NOBLEMEN.", (Note: pp. 8 and 9 - Extract from the ennoblement deed of July 14, 1655.) in gratitude for his services as the Prince's courier in the Carpathians, a function "which he fulfilled faithfully and steadfastly for many years, and especially in these stormy times [...]". (Note: p. 14 - Toma T. Socolescu writes: "My grandfather, Nicolae Gh. Socolescu, also an architect, having finished his studies in Vienna, was a descendant of a family that, through a distant ancestor, had obtained a noble rank, in 1655, from G. Rakoczy. The original document written in calfskin, in Latin, with gold letters and the family emblem in colors, laced and bearing the princely seal in red wax, is in the possession of Major S. Socol, former mayor of the city of Făgăraș, where he lives." (Translated from Romanian)) Around 1846, five Socol (Note: p. 14 - Toma T. Socolescu writes : "N. G. Socolescu (Socol, in Ardeal) came to Muntenia from the Berivoiu Mare commune, located at the foot of the mountains in the Făgăraș region, and settled in Ploiesti, together with his five other brothers, - around the revolution, around 1846, - namely in Sf. Spiridon outskirts. During my childhood and until later, there was his house in Culea Căleni, a ground-floor house, square-shaped, set back from the street and surrounded by a garden. He married Ioana, born Săndulescu, from the same suburb, and his name appears among the founders in the parish registers; and as was customary at the time, I believe he was also buried there - although the searches I made were unsuccessful - in 1872." (Translated from Romanian)) come to Muntenia, from Berivoiu Mare, in the territory of Făgăraș.

"Five brothers crossed the mountains, all builders, from the Făgăraș region, a village at the foot of the mountains, Berivoiul-Mare, where the name of Socol is still widespread today, and where one of their ancestors is said to have come from Munténie, namely from the region of Târgoviște, which is the home of the Socol family, being to this day, near Târgovişte, Valea lui Socol (the Socol Valley), as well as their two founding churches, in Răzvadu de Sus and Cornești. (Note: translation of an extract from page 37.) (Note: translation of an extract from page 177.)"

One of the brothers was architect Nicolae Gh. Socol (??-1872). He settled in Ploiești around 1840-1845, and named himself Socolescu. He married Iona Săndulescu, from the Sfantu Spiridon suburb. He had a daughter (died in infancy) and four sons, (Note: pp. 105-106.) (Note: pp. 214-215.) two of whom became major architects: Toma N. Socolescu and Ion N. Socolescu. The lineage of architects continues with Toma T. Socolescu, and his son Barbu Socolescu.

The historian, cartographer and geographer Dimitrie Papazoglu evokes, in 1891, (Note: p. 17 - Dimitrie Papazoglu, Istoria fondărei orașului București, București, Curtea Veche, 2005, p. 59.) the presence of Romanian boyars of the first rank Socoleşti, in Bucharest, descendants of Socol from Dâmbovița. Finally, Constantin Stan also refers, in 1928, to the precise origin of Nicolae Gheorghe Socol :

"At the foot of the Carpathians, on the right bank of the stream of the same name, lies the commune of Berivoiul-Mare [...], one of the oldest villages in the Olt household [...]. The inhabitants are composed of serfs and former boyars. [...], and the Romanian boyar families were: Socol, Boyer, Sinea and Răduleț, soldiers with border guard privileges.[...] The G. Streza Socol family gave birth to Nicolae Socol, a graduated architect from Vienna, who settled in the town of Ploeşti with several of his brothers around the middle of the last century. (Note: translation from Romanian of extracts from passages quoted on page 17 - Constantin Stan, Şcoala poporană din Făgăraş şi depe Târnave, Volumul.I, Făgăraşul. Sibiu, Tiparul institutului de arte Grafice “Dacia Traiană”, 1928, p. 150-152.)"

Family tree

Niculae Gheorghe Socol (~1820-1872) architect and builder in Ploiești	Ioana Săndulescu
Alexandrina Nicolau (1860–1900)	Toma N. Socolescu (1848–1897) architect and builder in Ploiești	Nicolae N. Socolescu timber merchant	Ghiță N. Socolescu artist painter, dead during his graduate studies	Ion N. Socolescu (1856–1924) architect
Florica Tănescu (1887-1969)	Toma T. Socolescu (1883–1960) professor-architect	Florica T. Socolescu	Smaranda T. Socolescu	Ioan T. Socolescu	Coralia-Ioana-Margareta T. Socolescu
Mircea Socolescu (1907–1978) settled in France in 1945, married without children	Toma Gheorghe Barbu Socolescu (1909–1977) professor-architect	Irena Gabriela Vasilescu (1910–1993) artist painter, teacher
Mihai Ștefan Marc Socolescu (1942–1994) teacher	Maria Lois (1942-2021) teacher
Laura Socolescu (1967) settled in France – artist-choreographer, dancer

== Architectural achievements ==
- Interior decoration of the liner Normandie in 1936, under the direction of professor of architecture Roger-Henri Expert.

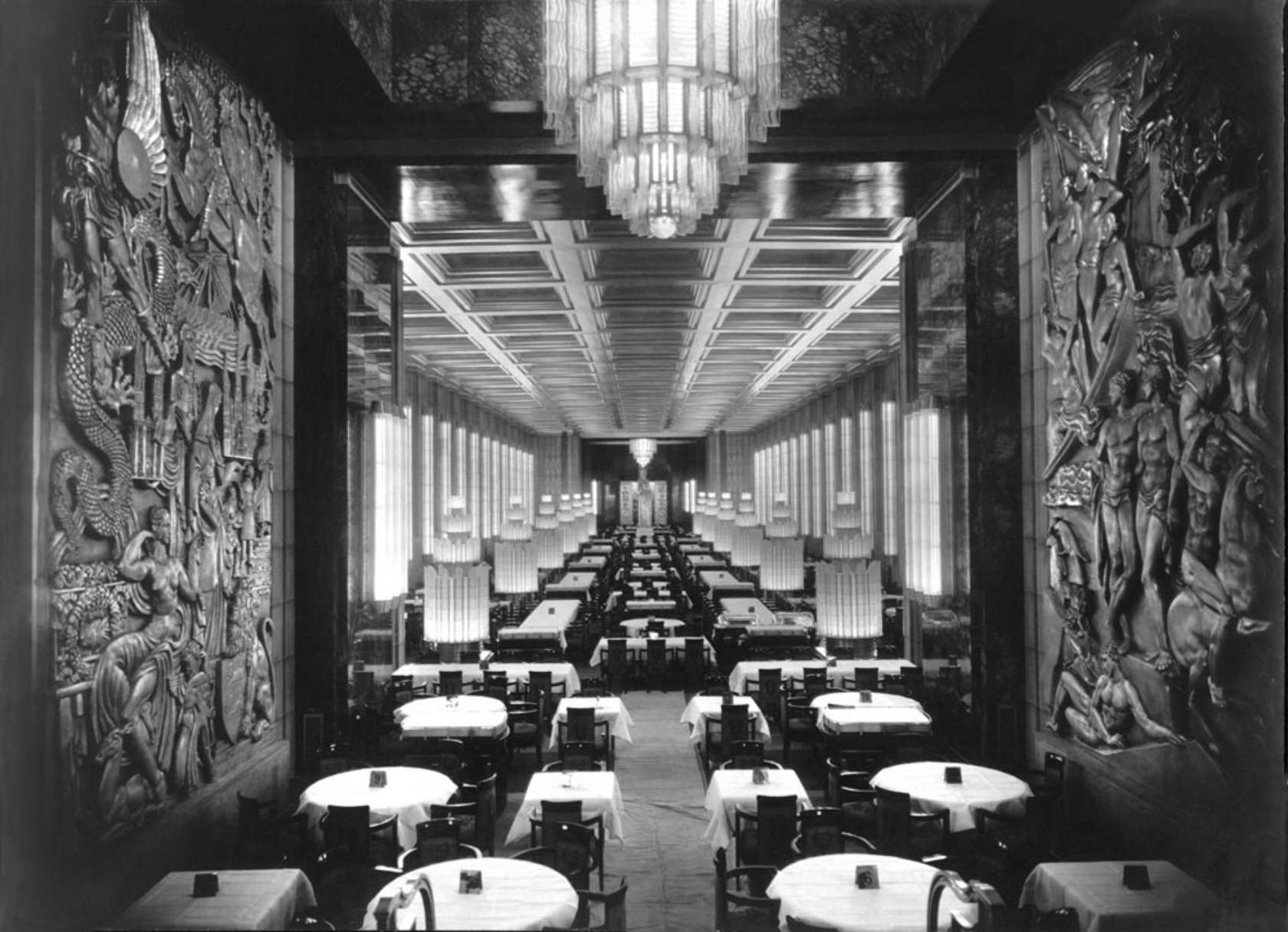
Interior of the liner "Normandie", 1935

- Villa of Dr Gheorghiu in Breaza, Prahova County, in 1940.

=== Civil and industrial construction ===
Almost all of Barbu Socolescu's projects are in the industrial field, particularly in the food industry. (Note: pp. 192 and 193.)

- Slănic Salt Mine Employee Housing Building (Salina Slănic), Prahova County, in 1942.
- Social complex and canteen of the municipality of Ghimpați, Giurgiu County, in 1942.
- Tobacco manufacturing and fermentation warehouse of the Cassa Autonomă a Monopolurilor Regatului României in Râmnicu Sărat and Târgu Jiu, in 1943.
- Salt deposit at Ocna Mureș, Alba County, in 1943.
- Administrative premises, staff accommodation and warehouses from Cassa Autonomă a Monopolurilor Regatului României in Fălticeni, Suceava County, in 1943.
- Oil factory in Craiova, in 1949.
- Cement plant of Bicaz, 1951.
- Various works for the Medgidia and Fieni cement plants: mechanical workshop, cement paste tank, canteen, administrative pavilion, in 1951
- Many other industrial constructions until 1966, including a vegetable canning factory in Ovidiu, near Constanța.
- A slaughterhouse in Ploiești, 1958.
- A canning factory in Tecuci (Romanian Moldavia), 1958. (Note: p. 206.)
- Several other industrial buildings until 1966, including the large Ovidiu vegetable canning factory (later Munca Ovidiu) at Ovidiu near Constanța in 1962. The project actually stretched from 1955 to 1966. In 1966, the plant was expanded to accommodate a Pepsi-Cola bottling line, one of only two production units in the country, the other being in Bucharest. The factory went bankrupt in 2005 and was dissolved.

The entire factory has been emptied of its machine tools, and only the building and its metal structures remain clearly recognizable (in April 2024), despite extensions and modifications. It is located in a square bounded by the strada Tulcea and the strada Intrarea petrolului.

== Conceived but unimplemented architectural projects ==
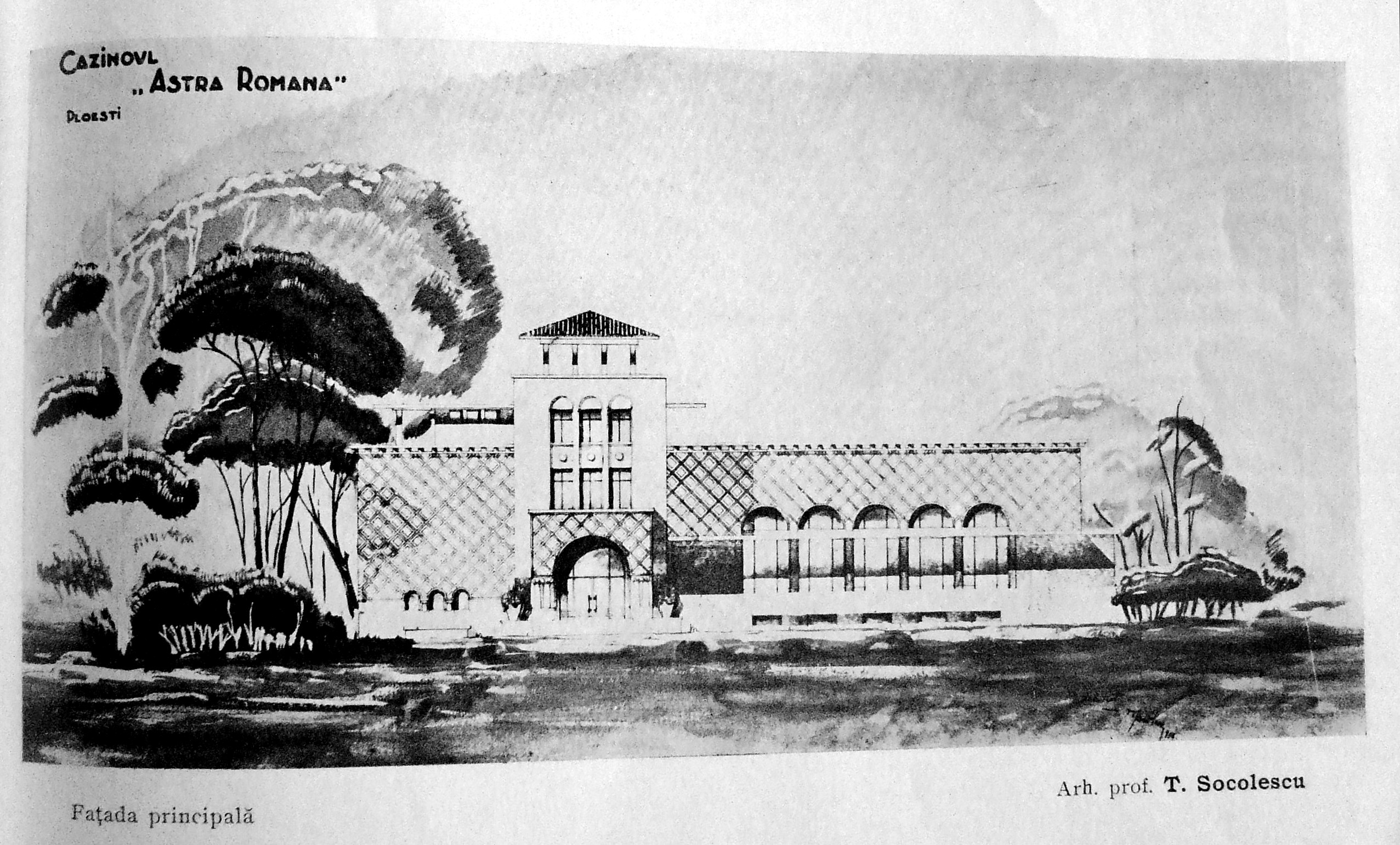
Sketch of a casino project for the Astra Româna refinery, Ploiești, Romania, 1937.

- Astra Refinery Casino, Ploiești, carried out with his father, Toma T. Socolescu, in 1937.
- Orthodox Church of Predeal in 1956 or 1957, another project carried out with his father. (Note: p. 205.)

== Bibliography ==
- George D. Florescu (1941–1942). Imprimeria Națională (ed.). "Un sfetnic al lui Matei Basarab, ginerele lui Mihai Viteazul" [A counsellor of Matei Basarab, the son-in-law of Michael the Brave] (PDF). Revista Istorică Română (in Romanian) (XI–XII). Bucharest: 66–94..
- (in Romanian) Petrescu, Gabriela (2024). ARHITECȚII SOCOLESCU 1840-1940, Studiu monografic [SOCOLESCU ARCHITECTS 1840-1940, Monographic study] (in Romanian). Bucharest: Editura Simetria. ISBN 978-973-1872-55-1.
- (in Romanian) Société des Architectes Roumains (SAR) (1909–1944). Arhitectura [Architecture] (Professional journal). all from 1909 (in Romanian). Bucharest: SAR. During the Communist period, it changed its name twice: Arhitectura RPR from 1960 to 1968, then Arhitectura again from 1968.
- Ernest Kay (director) (1976) [1972]. International Who's who in Art and Antiques (2nd ed.). Cambridge (UK): Melrose Press Ltd. p. 358. ISBN 0-900332-37-9..

== Other sources ==
- UAR Archives (Union of Architects of Romania) - UAR documentary archives (available on site on request).
- (France) Archives of the Paris School of Fine Arts / AGORHA - Plateforme de données de la recherche de l'Institut national d'histoire de l'art / Dictionnaire des élèves architectes de l’École des beaux-arts de Paris (1800-1968) Dictionary database, Paris.
- (Romania) Ion Mincu Architecture and Urbanism University Library, Bucharest.
- Socolescu family's archives (Paris, București) including a photographic collection.

== See also ==
- (Romania) Technical College of Architecture and Public Works Ioan N. Socolescu.
- (Romania) Arhitectura journal (contemporary edition) : Thematic dossier dedicated to industrial heritage, including an article by Ioana Irina Iamandescu (The International Committee for the Conservation of the Industrial Heritage), Deputy director of the National Heritage Institute, responsible for historical monuments, dated Octobre 2018 - Patrimoniul industrial în România - despre stadiul inventarierii specializate.
- (Romania) National Heritage Institute (Institutul Național al Patrimoniului), specialized page on industrial heritage: Patrimoniu industrial și tehnic.

== Notes and references ==
- (a) (in Romanian) Socolescu, Toma T. (1938). "Preface by Nicolae Iorga". Arhitectura în Ploești, studiu istoric [Architecture in Ploești, historical study] (in Romanian). Bucharest: Cartea Românească. 16725.
- (b) (in Romanian) Socolescu, Toma T. (2004). Amintiri [Memories] (in Romanian). Bucharest: Editura Caligraf Design. ISBN 973-86771-0-6.
- (c) (in Romanian) Sevastos, Mihail (1937). Monografia orașului Ploești [Monograph of the city of Ploești] (in Romanian). Bucharest: Cartea Românească.
- (d) Society of Romanian Architects (SAR) (1909–1944). Arhitectura [Architecture] (Professional journal). all from 1909 (in Romanian). Bucharest: SAR..
- (e) (in Romanian) Petrescu, Gabriela (2024). ARHITECȚII SOCOLESCU 1840-1940, Studiu monografic [SOCOLESCU ARCHITECTS 1840-1940, Monographic study] (in Romanian). Bucharest: Editura Simetria. ISBN 978-973-1872-55-1.
- Other notes and references :
