= Nicolae G. Socolescu =

Romanian architect (d. 1872)

Nicolae Gheorghe Socolescu
- Niculae Gheorghe Socol
- Born: around 1820; Berivoiul Mare, Austrian Empire
- Died: 1872; Ploiești, Romania
- Resting place: Sfântul Spiridon Church in Ploiești
- Other names: Nicolae Gh. Socolescu; Nicolae G. Socolescu; Niculae Gheorghe Socol; Niculae Gh. Socol; Niculae G. Socol
- Citizenship: (Romania) Romanian
- Education: Architecture in Vienna (but outside of the Academy of Fine Arts Vienna or the Vienna University of Technology).
- Occupation: Architect
- Years active: 1846-1872
- Spouse: Ioana Săndulescu
- Children: Toma N. Socolescu, Ion N. Socolescu
- Parent: G. Streza Socol
- Practice: Architecture, urban planning, civil construction, painter.
- Buildings: Europa, Carol and Victoria hotels in Ploiești, manors, villas and stores in the Prahova county.
- Design: Neoclassical architecture

Nicolae G. Socolescu (born Niculae Gheorghe Socol) was a 19th-century Romanian neoclassical and baroque architect.

== Biography ==
Originally from Transylvania, then part of Austria-Hungary, and born in the village of Berivoiul Mare in the Făgăraș region, he settled in Wallachia (Romania), in the city of Ploiești, along with his four brothers, all builders, around 1840–1846. (Note: p. 177.) He studied architecture in Vienna. (Note: p. 187.) In 1846, he began his career as an architect and master builder. After leaving the Austro-Hungarian Empire for Romania, he changed his name to Nicolae G. Socolescu upon his arrival in Ploiești. (Note: pp. 37, 47, 48 and 105.) (Note: pp. 138, 177, 187 and 214.) He became one of the leading architects and builders in Prahova County in the mid-19th century. He died in 1872 and was buried in the courtyard of the Sfântul Spiridon Church in Ploiești. (Note: p. 105.) (Note: p. 214.)

=== Genealogy ===
The Socol family of Berivoiul-Mare, formerly part of Făgăraș or Țara Făgărașului is a branch of the Socol family of Muntenia, which lived in the county of Dâmbovița. A 'Socol', great boyar and son-in-law of Mihai Viteazul (1557–1601), had two religious foundations in Dâmbovița county, still existing, Cornești and Răzvadu de Sus. He built their churches and another one in the suburb of Târgoviște. This boyar married Marula, daughter of Tudora din Popești, also known as Tudora din Târgșor, sister of Prince Antonie-Vodă. Marula was recognized by Mihai Viteazul as his illegitimate daughter, following an extra-marital liaison with Tudora. Marula is buried in the church of Răzvadu de Sus, where, on a richly carved stone slab, her name can be read.

Nicolae Iorga, the great Romanian historian and friend of Toma T. Socolescu, found Socol ancestors among the founders of the City of Făgăraș in the 12th century. (Note: Note 8 - p. 15.) In 1655, the Prince of Transylvania George II Rákóczi ennobled an ancestor of Nicolae G. Socol: "Ștefan Boier din Berivoiul Mare, and through him his wife Sofia Spătar, his son Socoly, and their heirs and descendants of whatever sex, to be treated and regarded as true and undeniable NOBLEMEN.", (Note: pp. 8 and 9 - Extract from the ennoblement deed of July 14, 1655.) in gratitude for his services as the Prince's courier in the Carpathians, a function "which he fulfilled faithfully and steadfastly for many years, and especially in these stormy times [...]". (Note: p. 14 - Toma T. Socolescu writes: "My grandfather, Nicolae Gh. Socolescu, also an architect, having finished his studies in Vienna, was a descendant of a family that, through a distant ancestor, had obtained a noble rank, in 1655, from G. Rakoczy. The original document written in calfskin, in Latin, with gold letters and the family emblem in colors, laced and bearing the princely seal in red wax, is in the possession of Major S. Socol, former mayor of the city of Făgăraș, where he lives." (Translated from Romanian)) Around 1846, five Socol (Note: p. 14 - Toma T. Socolescu writes : "N. G. Socolescu (Socol, in Ardeal) came to Muntenia from the Berivoiu Mare commune, located at the foot of the mountains in the Făgăraș region, and settled in Ploiesti, together with his five other brothers, - around the revolution, around 1846, - namely in Sf. Spiridon outskirts. During my childhood and until later, there was his house in Culea Căleni, a ground-floor house, square-shaped, set back from the street and surrounded by a garden. He married Ioana, born Săndulescu, from the same suburb, and his name appears among the founders in the parish registers; and as was customary at the time, I believe he was also buried there - although the searches I made were unsuccessful - in 1872." (Translated from Romanian)) come to Muntenia, from Berivoiu Mare, in the territory of Făgăraș.

"Five brothers crossed the mountains, all builders, from the Făgăraș region, a village at the foot of the mountains, Berivoiul-Mare, where the name of Socol is still widespread today, and where one of their ancestors is said to have come from Munténie, namely from the region of Târgoviște, which is the home of the Socol family, being to this day, near Târgovişte, Valea lui Socol (the Socol Valley), as well as their two founding churches, in Răzvadu de Sus and Cornești. (Note: translation of an extract from page 37.) (Note: translation of an extract from page 177.)"

One of the brothers was architect Nicolae Gh. Socol (??-1872). He settled in Ploiești around 1840-1845, and named himself Socolescu. He married Iona Săndulescu, from the Sfantu Spiridon suburb. He had a daughter (died in infancy) and four sons, (Note: pp. 105-106.) (Note: pp. 214-215.) two of whom became major architects: Toma N. Socolescu and Ion N. Socolescu. The lineage of architects continues with Toma T. Socolescu, and his son Toma Barbu Socolescu.

The historian, cartographer and geographer Dimitrie Papazoglu evokes, in 1891, (Note: p. 17 - Dimitrie Papazoglu, Istoria fondărei orașului București, București, Curtea Veche, 2005, p. 59.) the presence of Romanian boyars of the first rank Socoleşti, in Bucharest, descendants of Socol from Dâmbovița. Finally, Constantin Stan also refers, in 1928, to the precise origin of Nicolae Gheorghe Socol :

"At the foot of the Carpathians, on the right bank of the stream of the same name, lies the commune of Berivoiul-Mare [...], one of the oldest villages in the Olt household [...]. The inhabitants are composed of serfs and former boyars. [...], and the Romanian boyar families were: Socol, Boyer, Sinea and Răduleț, soldiers with border guard privileges.[...] The G. Streza Socol family gave birth to Nicolae Socol, a graduated architect from Vienna, who settled in the town of Ploeşti with several of his brothers around the middle of the last century. (Note: translation from Romanian of extracts from passages quoted on page 17 - Constantin Stan, Şcoala poporană din Făgăraş şi depe Târnave, Volumul.I, Făgăraşul. Sibiu, Tiparul institutului de arte Grafice “Dacia Traiană”, 1928, p. 150-152.)"

Family tree

Niculae Gheorghe Socol (~1820-1872) architect and builder in Ploiești	Ioana Săndulescu
Alexandrina Nicolau (1860–1900)	Toma N. Socolescu (1848–1897) architect and builder in Ploiești	Nicolae N. Socolescu timber merchant	Ghiță N. Socolescu artist painter, dead during his graduate studies	Ion N. Socolescu (1856–1924) architect
Florica Tănescu (1887-1969)	Toma T. Socolescu (1883–1960) professor-architect	Florica T. Socolescu	Smaranda T. Socolescu	Ioan T. Socolescu	Coralia-Ioana-Margareta T. Socolescu
Mircea Socolescu (1907–1978) settled in France in 1945, married without children	Toma Gheorghe Barbu Socolescu (1909–1977) professor-architect	Irena Gabriela Vasilescu (1910–1993) artist painter, teacher
Mihai Ștefan Marc Socolescu (1942–1994) teacher	Maria Lois (1942-2021) teacher
Laura Socolescu (1967) settled in France – artist-choreographer, dancer

== Architectural achievements ==
The period when Socol settled in Wallachia corresponds to a political and cultural will, widely shared across the country, to move closer to the West and distance itself from Eastern culture. A genuine desire to assimilate Western values permeated Romanian society. Architecture was one of the most visible expressions of this shift. The demand for Neoclassical or Baroque constructions, styles popular in Western Europe, quickly prevailed over others. This was reinforced by the favorable context of a city undergoing rapid economic and commercial growth, with the construction of the first factories and oil refineries.
Applying the concepts and style he learned during his architectural studies in Vienna, Socol’s works are neo-classical and neo-Gothic but also eclectics. (Note: page 74.) He was the first Romanian architect to settle in Ploiești, practicing architecture in the region for 30 years as early as 1840. (Note: p. 188.) Most of the architects working in Romania at the time were foreigners (Note: p. 20 - Foreign architects, engineers, and craftsmen played an important role in the history of the modernization of the Principalities. Among the few Romanian architects active in the first half of the 19th century were: in Moldova, Gh. and D. Asachi, Al. Costinescu, and in Muntenia, Nicolae G. Socolescu, à Ploiești, Jupân Ioniță and Vitul in Bucharest, Alexandru Orăscu, with studies in Berlin and Munich. In 1843, the architect of the city of Ploiești was the Swiss Johann Schlatter, and in 1847, the city's architect was the Austrian Karl Hartel, the author of the first building of the courthouse, police and fire department pavilion, designed in neoclassical style. (Translated from Romanian).) often from Transylvania, and few reached the level of the foreign architects brought in by the princes and rulers of the epoch. The first architectural training in the country dates only from 1864, with the creation of the Architecture section within the School of Fine Arts, a section founded by architect Alexandru Orăscu. (Note: pp. 14 and 47.) (Note: pp. 154 and 187.) The architect responded to a strong demand for Westernization and also for the transformation of traditional inns (han) into more comfortable houses with upper floors, or even high-end hotels. He also built numerous shops and stores for the merchants of Ploiești. He was also one of the founders and builders of the Sfântul Spiridon Church, in the suburb near the city center, where he lived. (Note: p. 761.)

=== In Ploiești ===
- The family home, located in Ploiești suburb called Sfântul Spiridon, (Note: p. 181.) circa 1846. It was destroyed during the construction of the Central Market Halls of Ploiești in the 1930s.
- Europa hotel, it originally hosted stores on the first floor and residential apartments upstairs, (Note: pp. 177-178.) built for the Radovici brothers. They played leading political roles at the time: Alexandru G. Radovici, a politician of national stature who was elected deputy, senator, mayor of Ploiești, but also minister of industry and commerce and vice-president of the Chamber of Deputies before 1914, ending up Director of the Central Bank during the war, (Note: page 431: Biography of the politician; p. 422: 'The Mayors's Gallery'.) and his brother the Dr. Ioan G. Radovici. (Note: pp. 136-137. A humanist physician caring for the poor and unfortunate in the hospital and dedicating his time to the common good, he was also a deputy, prefect, and member of a reformist parliamentary commission.) Later renovated, then raised by one storey and attic-roofed by his grandson Toma T. Socolescu before 1914, it was badly damaged by the American bombardments of 1944, poorly rebuilt, and finally destroyed in the 1960s-70s by the communists to make way for the administrative palace.
- Victoria hotel, on the strada Romană, which for a time remained the property of Tane and Panait Tănescu. (Note: pp. 44-45 (historic photograph of the building from the 1930s) and 47.) (Note: pp. 184-185 and 187.)

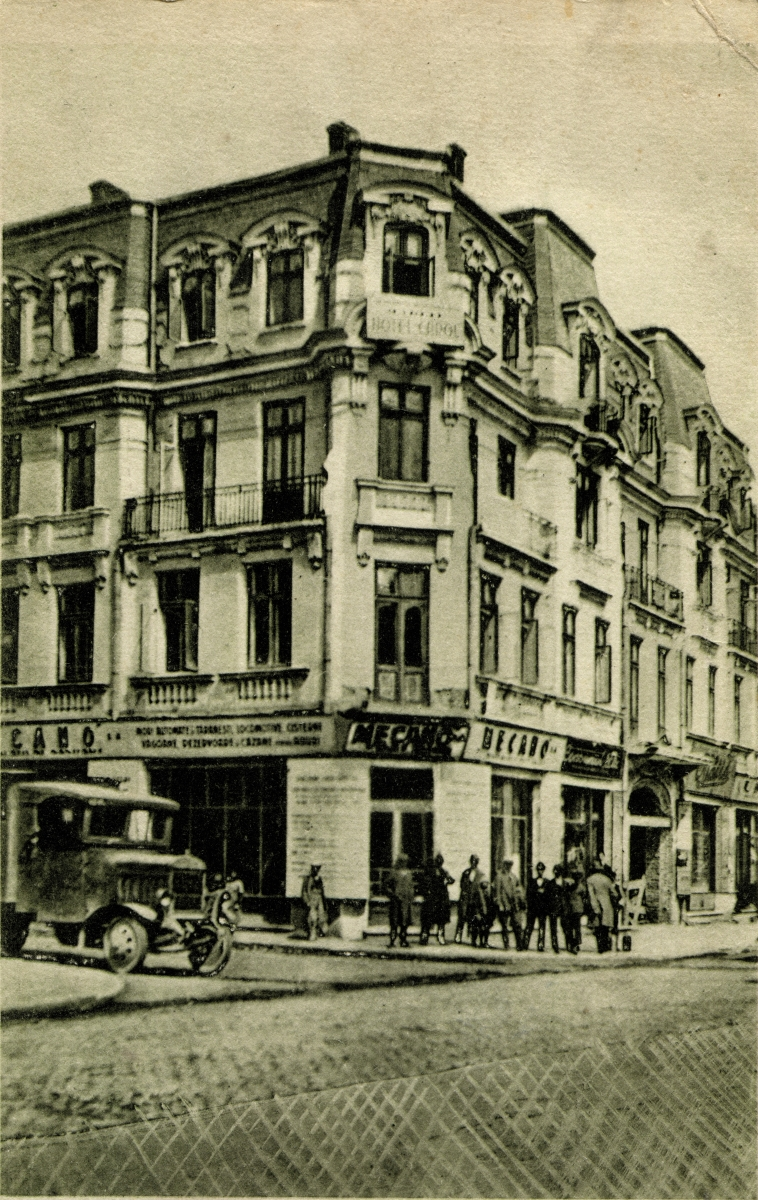
Carol hotel, around 1926.

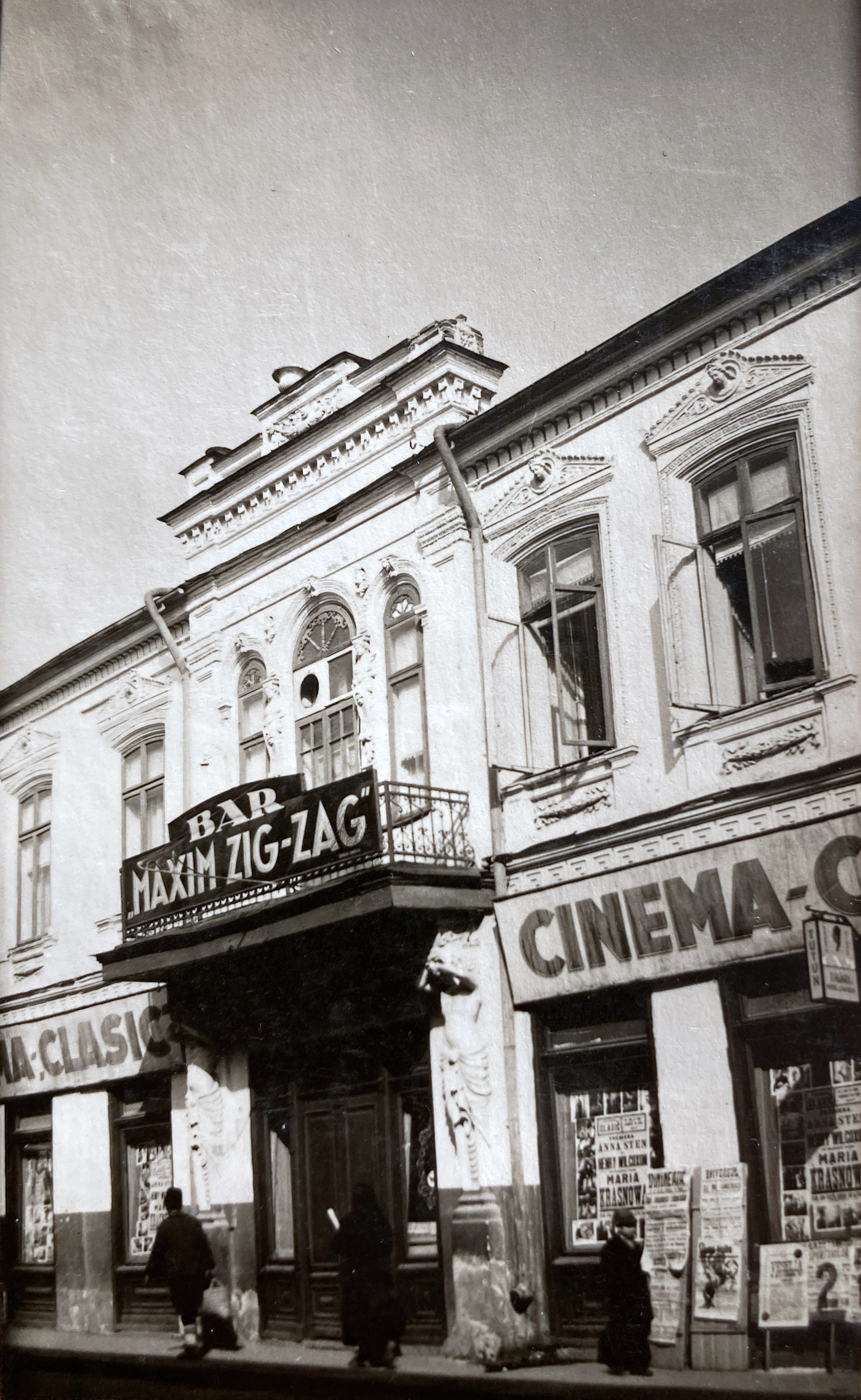
Victoria hotel around 1937.

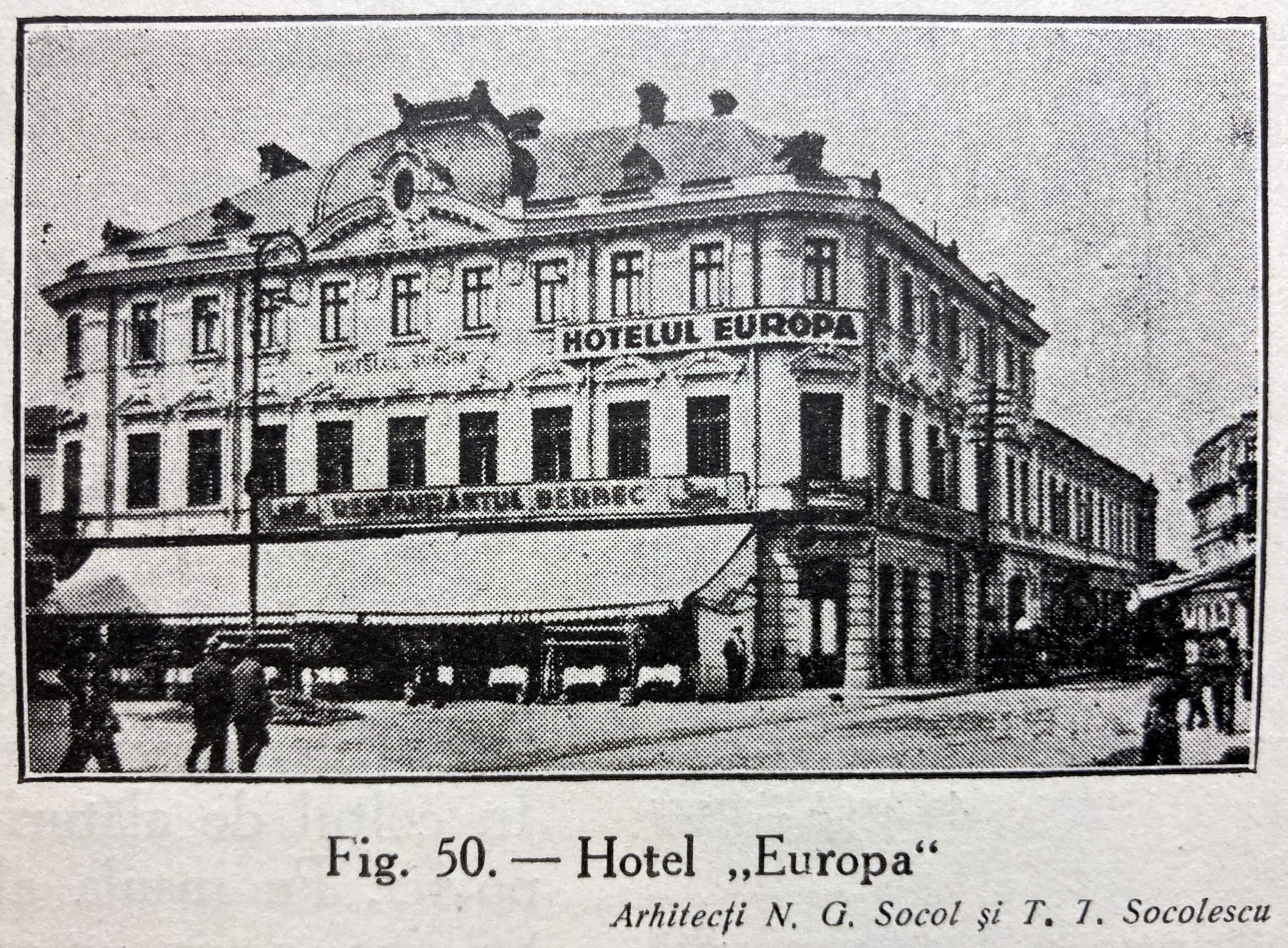
Europa hotel in the 1930's.

Niculae Gh. Socol's hotels.

- The Hagi Petre Buzilă or Bujilă's inn (hanul Hagi Petre Buzilă), in 1858, at the crossroads of calea Câmpinii and strada Romană. (Note: pp. 182-183.) The former Tribunal moved there in November 1860, renting its premises. (Note: Note 5, pp. 46-47.) (Note: Note 5, pp. 186-187.) It was bombed in 1944 and destroyed immediately after the war.
- The inn of Hagi Niţă Pitiși or Hagi Niţă Pittiș, in 1857, located near the halls. (Note: pp. 42-43 and 46.) (Note: pp. 182-183 and 186.) It is in the same style as the Hagi Petre Buzilă inn. In 1937, Toma T. Socolescu provided a description of the owner: (Note: p. 182.)
  "A native of Transylvania, he was a leading merchant on the strada Lipscani; a religious man, he closed his store during religious services on Sundays and public holidays, and was highly regarded by his fellow citizens. The building is still preserved in its original shape."
  The building was still intact in 1938. Damaged by the 1944 American bombings of 1944, it was rebuilt in a completely different style to the original (without decorations and with an additional storey). It was eventually demolished in the 1950s, and replaced by a seven-storey, unstyled Communist housing block. (Note: History and photographs: Lucian Vasile (historien) (2022-01-06). "Care-i treaba cu blocul "7 etaje"?" ["What's the deal with the '7 floors' building?]. republicaploiesti.net (Republica Ploiesti - Povești despre vechiul Ploiești) (in Romanian).)
- A big boyar house for the commissioner Panaiote Filitis, (Note: pp. 172-173.) located calea Câmpinii. A house that he also restored later for the new owner: Dumitru D. Hariton, mayor of Ploiești from May 1892 to August 1894. The building has since been demolished.
- A store with several boutiques, located at the intersection of calea Romană and calea Câmpinii for Hagi Petre Buzilă, circa 1852. His grandson Toma T. Socolescu described its architecture 70 years later in his work Arhitectura în Ploești, studiu istoric:
  "It was one of the most successful and most representative examples of this so-called Austrian style, yet bearing the distinct influence of Northern Italian architecture: a neo-Gothic design, with intricate and refined ornamentation, both beneath the cornices and in the tympana of the arches. It truly deserved to be preserved, especially as it remained in excellent condition.".
  Half of it was later destroyed for another construction. It no longer exists today.

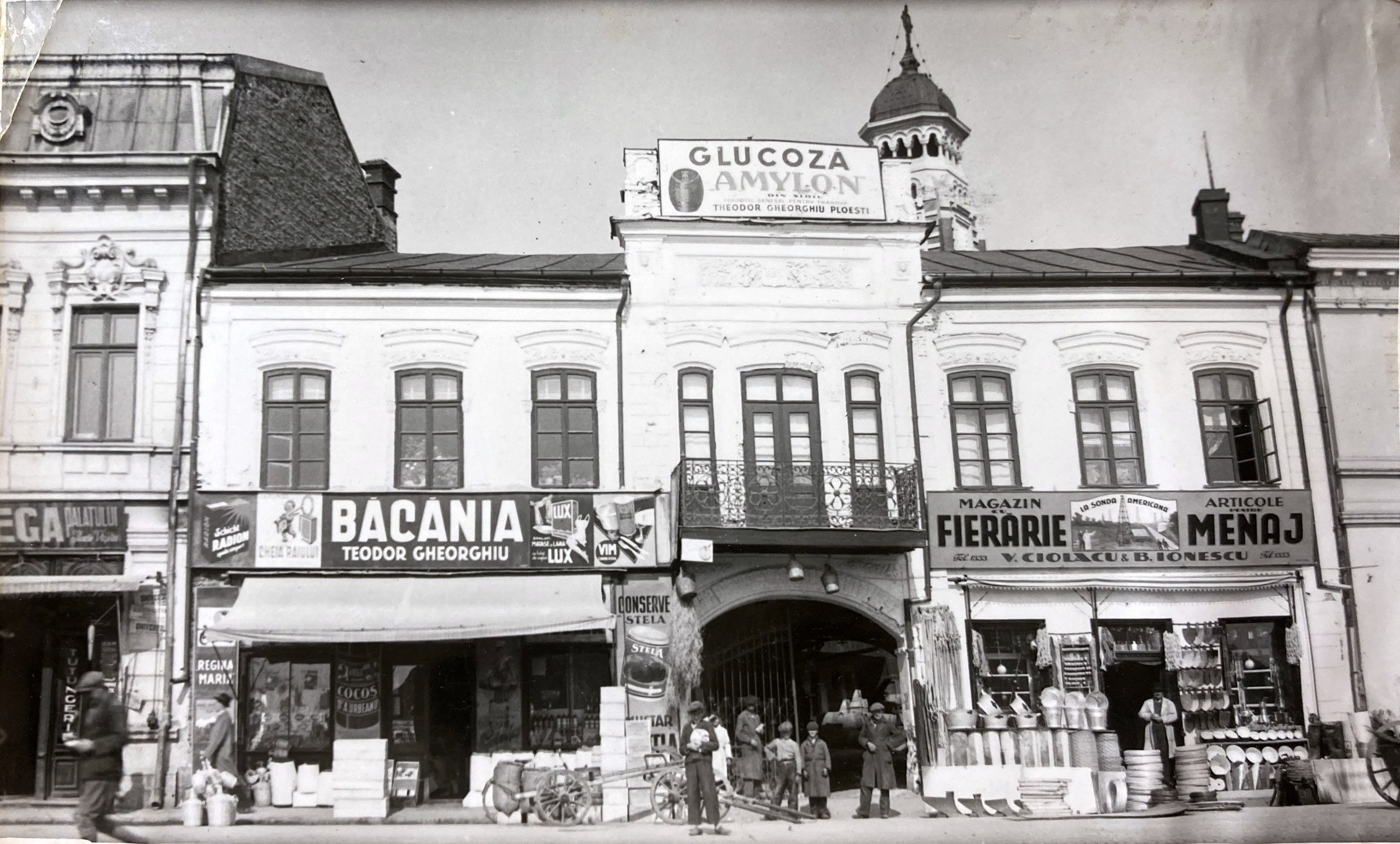
Hagi Niţă Pitiși's inn.

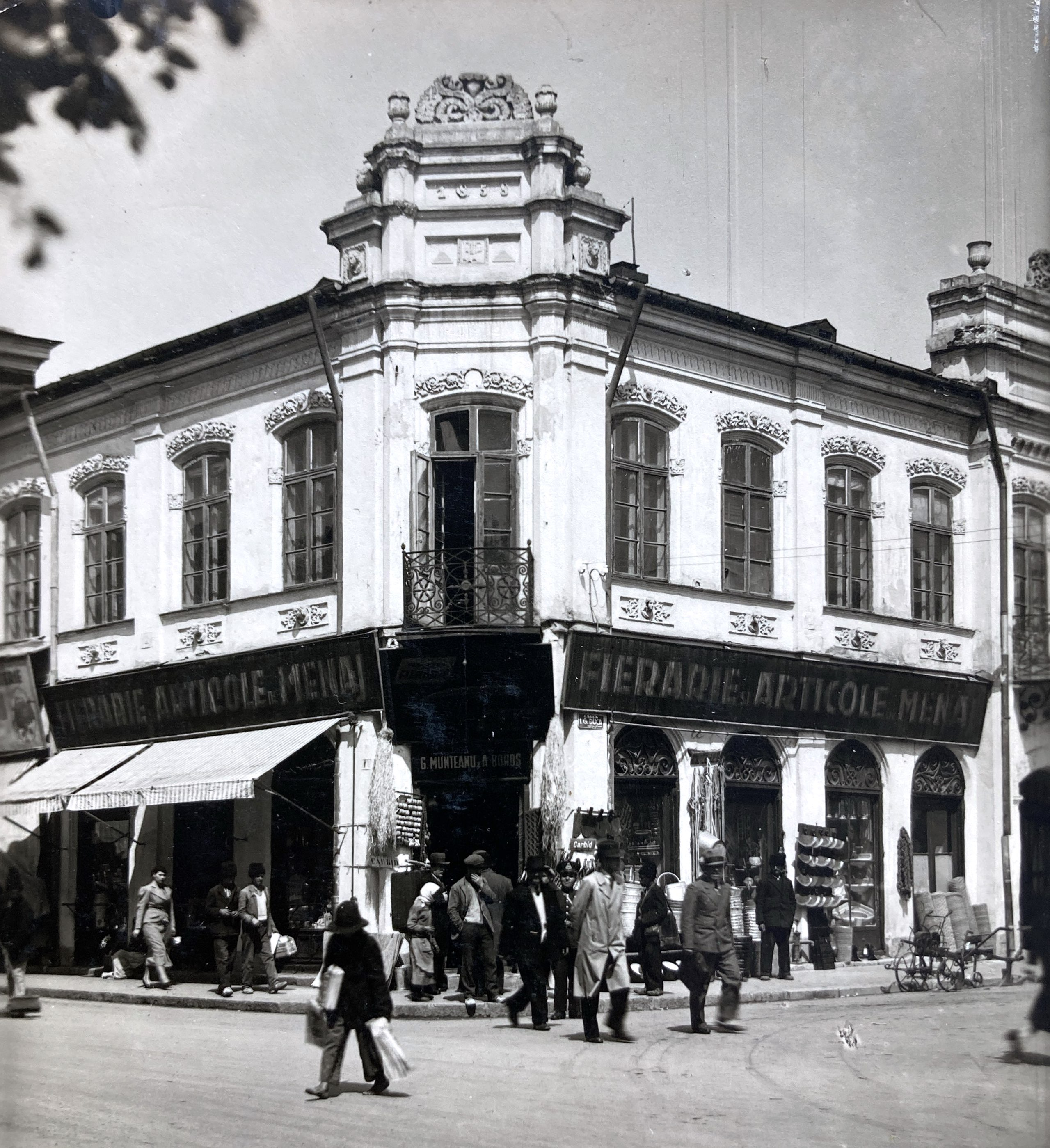
Hagi Petre Buzilă's inn.

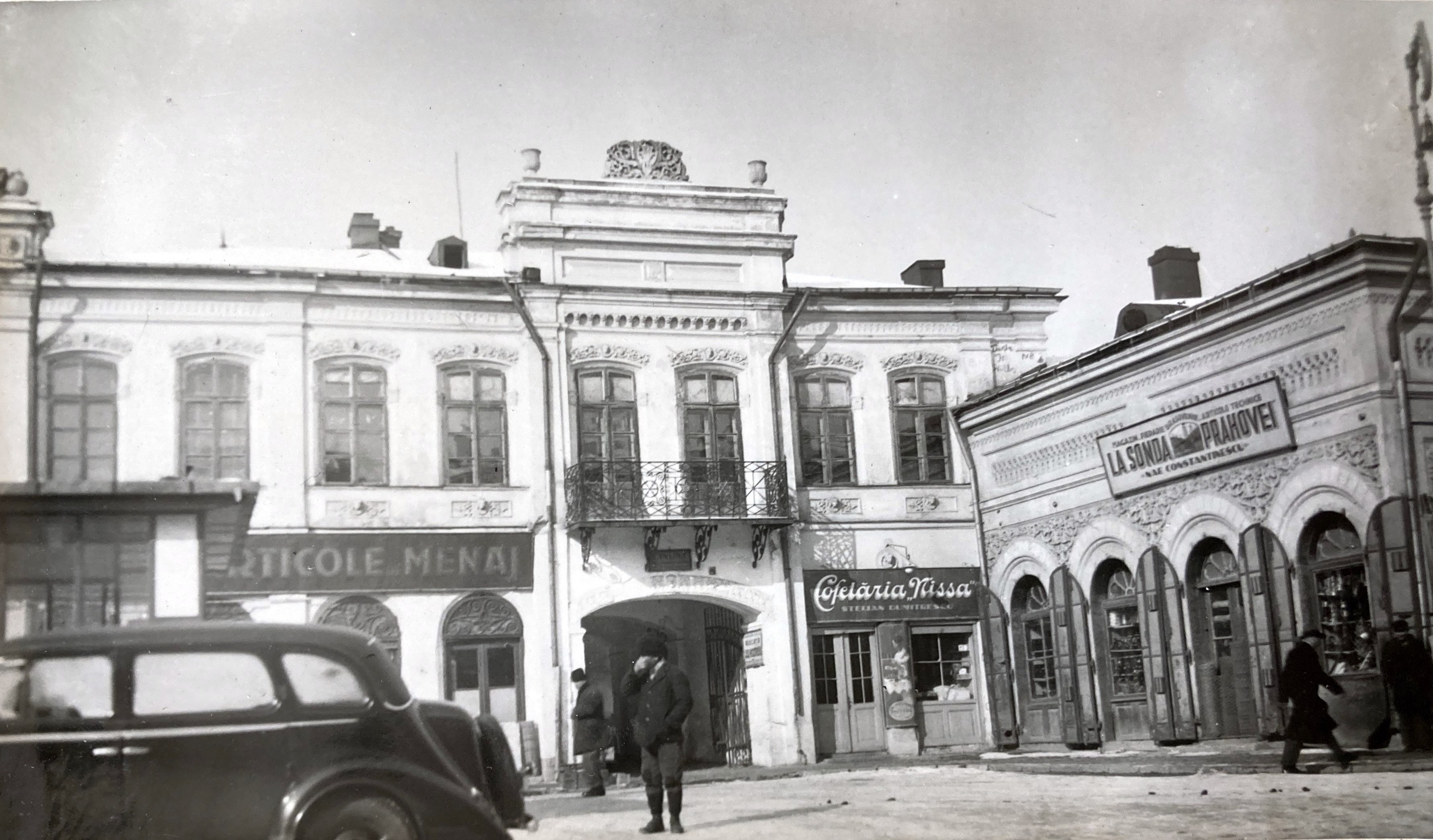
Hagi Petre Buzilă's inn, building aisle.

Niculae Gh.Socol's inns.

=== Outside Ploiești ===
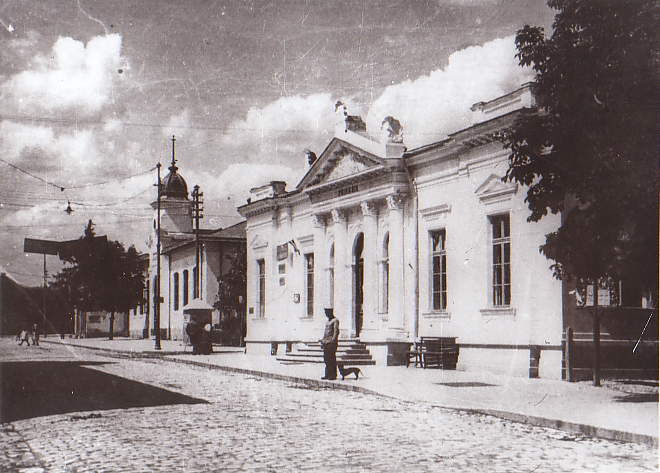
Câmpina Town Hall around 1900, formerly home of Zaharia Carcalechi.

- In Câmpina, around 1850, Zaharia Carcalechi's house, journalist and publisher native from Brașov. It later became, in 1877, the town hall of Câmpina. Restored by his son Toma N. Socolescu around 1880, it is located at the intersection of Doftanei avenue, and the city's central boulevard, Carol I Boulevard. It was demolished in 1922, and another town hall was built on the same site.
- The palace of the Bărcănescu family, or palatul Bărcănescu, in the commune of Bărcănești.
- Many buildings in Târgoviște.

=== Attributed works ===
The absence of archives and written records in the 19th century makes it difficult to attribute certain works. However, the work of Toma T. Socolescu in his historical study on the architecture of Ploiești, and particularly his research around 1937 in the archives of the city court and the town hall, (Note: page 1 "CUVÂNT INTRODUCTIV", the book is also regularly annotated with local archive sources on which the author relies.) aimed at finding conclusive elements on the old constructions, allows for the attribution of other works to the architect. The author of the study, a keen expert on Romanian architecture from the 18th century onwards, analyzes the style of the buildings and relies on testimonies from descendants:

"Based on their architecture, the period in which they were built, and the statement of the elderly man V. Pitişi, son of Hagi N. Pitişi, I can confidently affirm that these two inns, which are undeniably designed by the same architect, as well as the Moldavia hotel building, the I. Radovici house as it was (now the Carol hotel), the house of brothers I. and G. Radovici (now the Europa hotel), restored by myself, the former Victoria hotel (Fig. 65), once owned by Tane and Panait Tănescu, the former Panaiote Filitis house on Calea Câmpinii, later owned by D. D. Hariton, also on calea Câmpinii, the Petrache Filitis house, later owned by N. Rășcan, the Sfântul Spiridon Church, the row of shops of P. P. Panțu, now transformed into a façade, formerly owned by Hagi Jecu, and many others in the same style and period, were all built — both the plans and the execution, as was customary at the time — by Nicolae G. Socolescu (originally Socol), architect.”.

We can thus list the works attributed to Nicolae Gheorghe Socolescu by Toma T. Socolescu:

- The Moldavia hotel, resulting from the transformation of a post office for Nica Filip family, still standing in 1937. (Note: pp. 43 and 47.) (Note: pp. 183 and 187.)
- The luxury hotel Carol Palace, created through the transformation of Dr. I. Radovici’s residence. (Note: pp. 47 and 104.) (Note: pp. 187 and 213.) Located at the intersection of strada Unirii and strada Romană. It was demolished by the communists in the 1980s to make way for the extension of the new telecommunications building, which was in turn abandoned in the 2000s. (Note: Web pages mentioning the Carol Hotel: Lucian Vasile (2011-01-06). "Palatul Telefoanelor" [Palace of Telecommunications]. republicaploiesti.net (Republica Ploiesti - Povești despre vechiul Ploiești) (in Romanian)..; Lucian Vasile (2016-06-17). "Top 10 clădiri dispărute ale orașului Ploiești" [Top 10 Lost Buildings of the City of Ploiești]. republicaploiesti.net (Republica Ploiesti - Povești despre vechiul Ploiești) (in Romanian)..; Lucian Vasile (2020-10-02). "Cât costa o cameră la hotelurile din Ploiești în 1934?" [How much did a room cost at the hotels in Ploiești in 1934?]. republicaploiesti.net (Republica Ploiesti - Povești despre vechiul Ploiești) (in Romanian)..; Lucian Vasile (2012-09-04). "Hotel Europa". republicaploiesti.net (Republica Ploiesti - Povești despre vechiul Ploiești) (in Romanian)..)
- Petrache Filitis's house, on calea Câmpinii, at the crossing of strada Carpați, which later became N. Rășcan street. Degraded over time by a series of tragic events: 1940 earthquake, the American bombings of 1944, and then dispossession by the communists, it ended up like most houses that were neither maintained nor reinforced by the communists: destroyed in the 1980s. (Note: Photographs and history of the Rășcan house degradation: Lucian Vasile (2013-03-11). "Inapoi pe Calea Campinii" [Back on calea Campinii]. republicaploiesti.net (Republica Ploiesti - Povești despre vechiul Ploiești) (in Romanian).)
- Sfântu Spiridon church in the suburb of the same name where he lived. The church was consecrated on December 11, 1854. Among the benefactors, the architect's name appears on a pisania (engraved stone plaque) above the church door.
- A row of stores for P. P. Panţu, formerly owned by Hagi Jecu, whose facades were later transformed.
- Two buildings constructed by Nicolae Socol and his son Toma N. Socolescu on strada I. G. Duca (now Romană), the first on the corner with strada Negustori, with stores on the first floor, and the second a small dwelling house on the same I. G. Duca street at no. 108. On their frontispiece, are drawn the two lions found in other buildings of the period, all in a delicate neo-classical style. (Note: pp. 191-192.) The first house now located at the corner of strada Romană and strada Ştefan Greceanu, is still visible, it is the Călugăru inn or hanul Călugăru. The wing located at strada Romană is clearly recognizable, (Note: Comparison with a photograph on page 52, also published in this article, and a contemporary photograph (2025).) (Note: Comparison with a photograph on page 52, also published in this article, and a contemporary photograph (2025).) with its entrance gate unchanged from the original, although the pediment of the entrance for carts and carriages has been disfigured. This construction would therefore be the only one still existing and recognizable today in Ploiești, built by Niculae Gheorghe Socol.

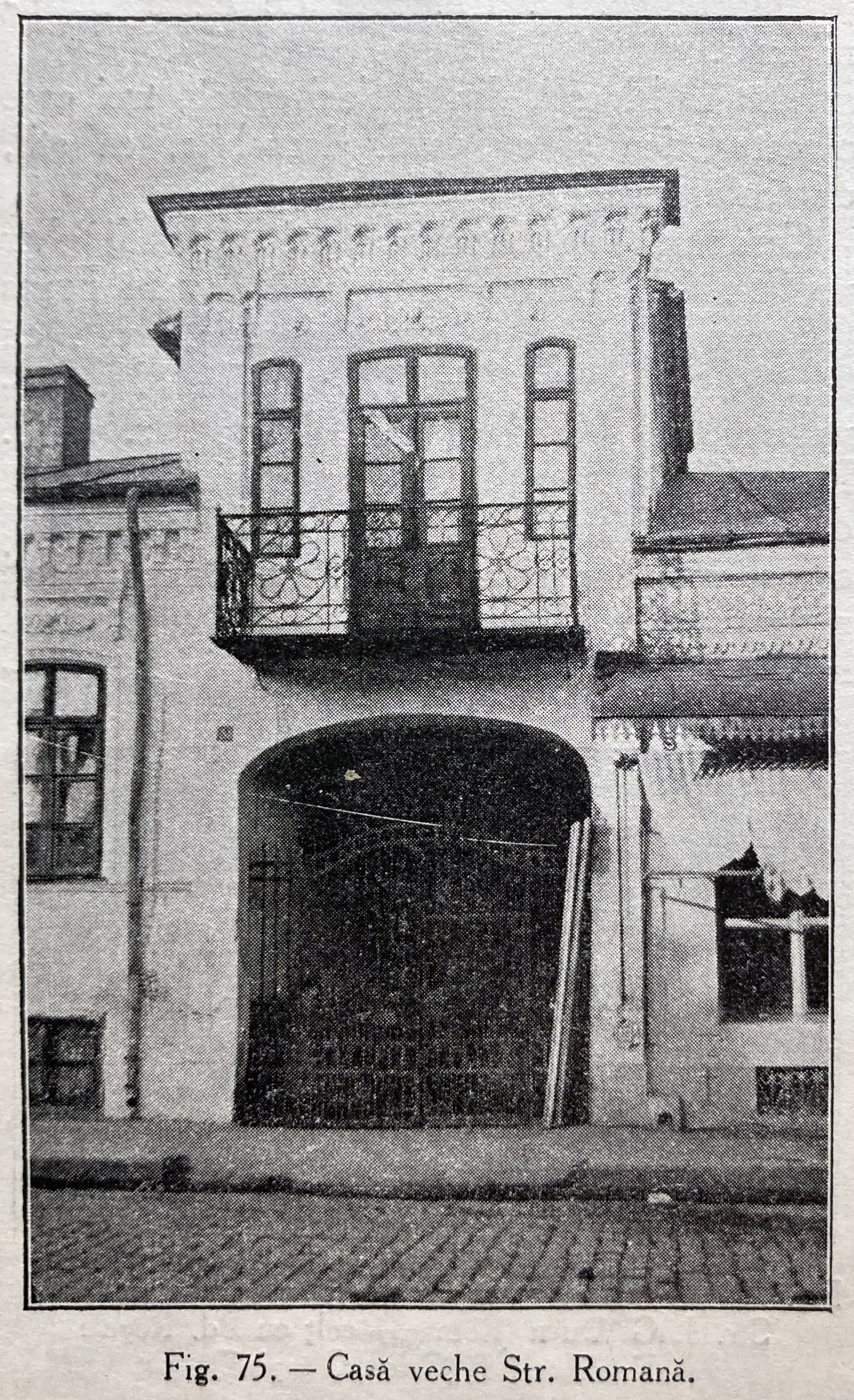
Hanul Călugăru, in 1937.

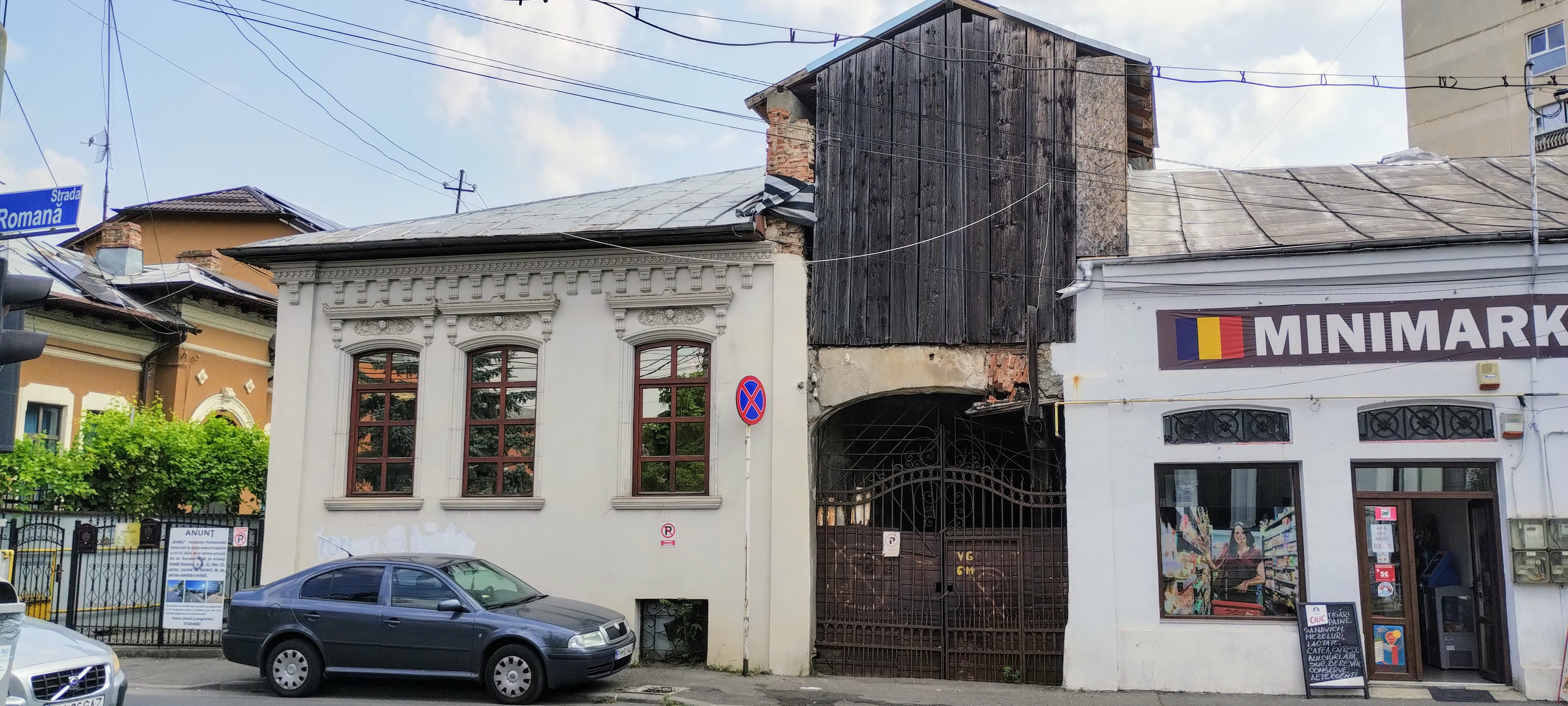
Hanul Călugăru, in 2025.

Hanul Călugăru.

== Legacy ==
Influenced by Austrian classical and baroque styles that he observed in Vienna, Nicolae G. Socolescu remains a neoclassical architect. In Romania, within the architectural world, he is among the first active Romanian architects of the 19th century. He contributed to the country's modernization movement in architecture and civil construction. Like many of his contemporaries, all trained in Western Europe, he introduced to Romania what he had seen and learned during his stay in Vienna. Western styles, culturally distinct—neoclassical, Neoclassical, Baroque, Italian or Neo-Gothic were highly sought after by the merchants of Prahova, his primary clients, who were also eager to Westernize and detach themselves from the oriental influence, particularly that of their former protector, the Ottoman Empire, from which the country was then in the process of liberating itself. Socol left his mark on Ploiești with his style for nearly 100 years (1846 to 1944), and his work, exemplified by the Carol Hotel, remained visible until 1980, before the communist systematization under Ceaușescu.

Unfortunately, nearly all of his works were destroyed or radically altered over time, due to the tragic events that Romania had to endure and the modernizations of the 20th century. The construction of the Central Market Halls (1929-1935) first required the demolition of some of his works. (Note: pp. 20, 22 and 25.) It was the American bombings of 1944 that destroyed a significant portion of his creations, many of which were still standing at the time. Finally, the communist systematization delivered the final blow, erasing almost all visible traces of his architectural work. The only remaining example is the building of the former 'Călugăru' inn in Ploiești.

However, Socol laid the foundations for the creative and innovative work of his descendants: Toma N., Ion N. and then Toma T. Socolescu. His financial stability also provided a stepping stonee for his two sons, who continued his architectural legacy: Ion N. Socolescu and Toma N. Socolescu, and made a significant impact on Romanian architecture.

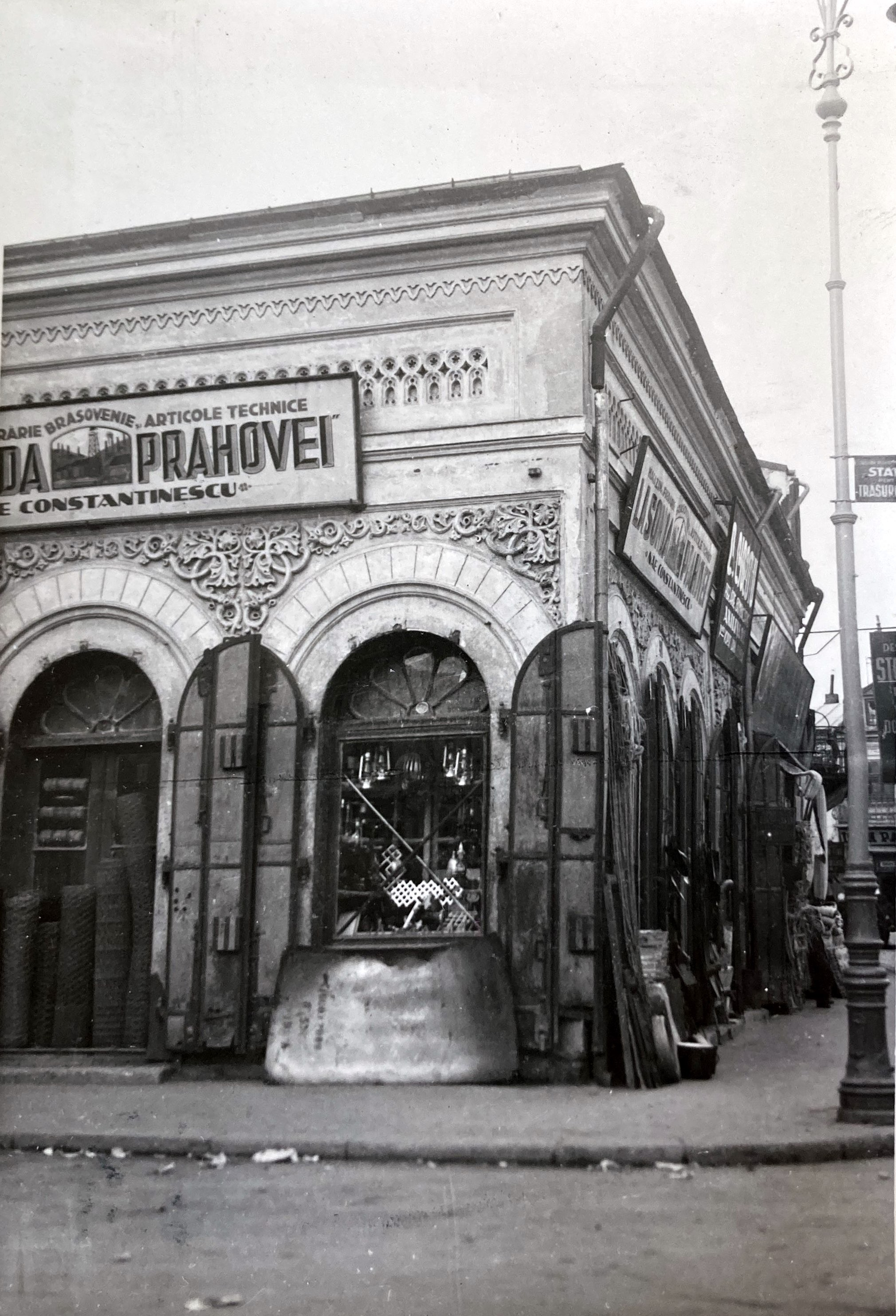
Hagi Petre Buzilă's store.

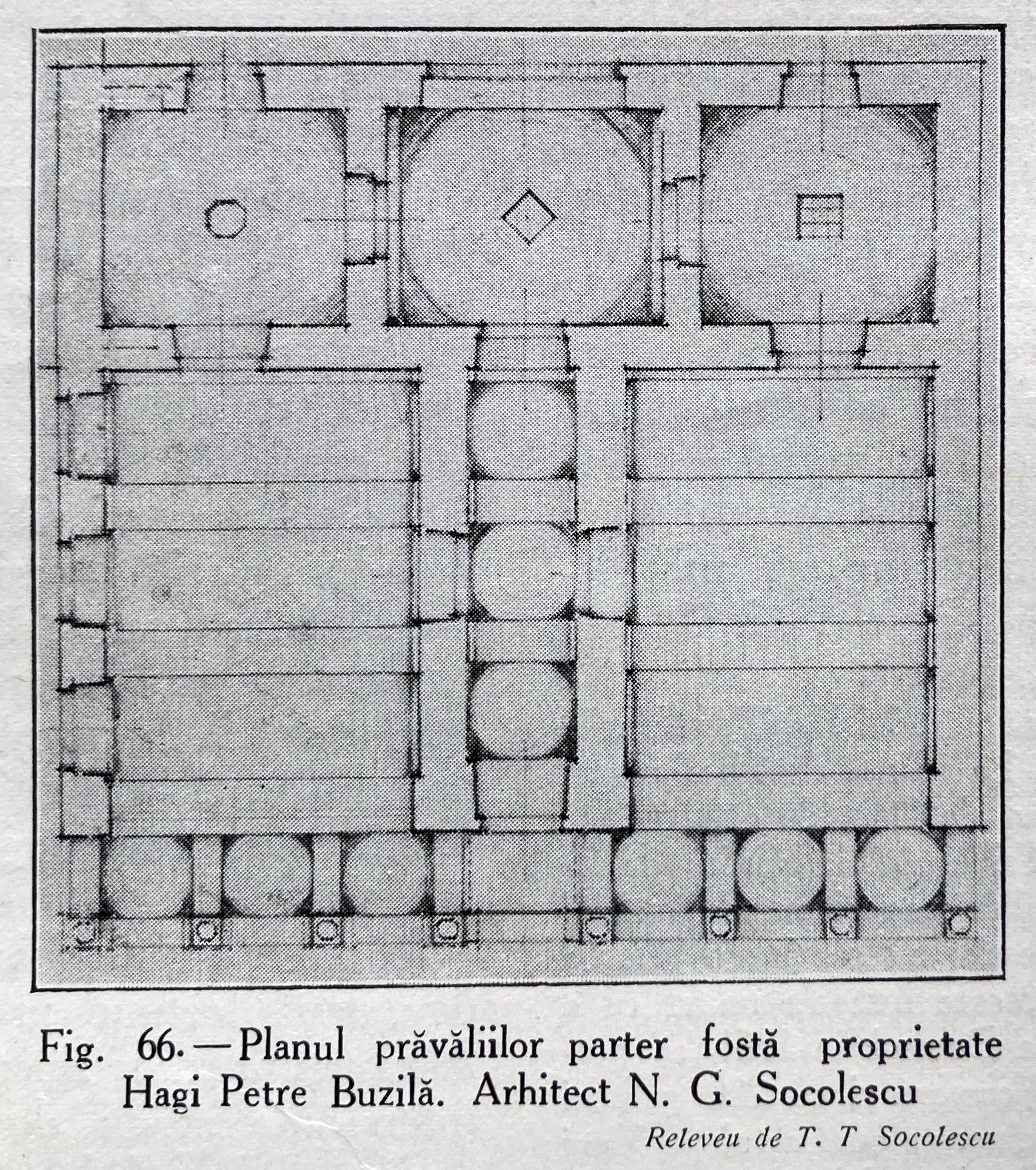
Hagi Petre Buzilă's store plan.

Niculae Gh.Socol's stores.

== Bibliography ==
- George D. Florescu (1941–1942). "Un sfetnic al lui Matei Basarab, ginerele lui Mihai Viteazul" [A counsellor of Matei Basarab, the son-in-law of Michael the Brave] (PDF). Revista Istorică Română (in Romanian) (XI–XII). Bucharest: Imprimeria Națională: 66–94..
- Toma T. Socolescu (2004). Amintiri [Memories] (in Romanian). Bucharest: Caligraf Design. ISBN 973-86771-0-6. ·
- Toma T. Socolescu (2004). Fresca arhitecților care au lucrat în România în epoca modernă 1800 - 1925 [Fresco of architects who worked in Romania in the modern era 1800 - 1925] (in Romanian). Bucharest: Editura Caligraf Design. ISBN 973-86771-1-4.
- Toma T. Socolescu (1938). "Preface by Nicolae Iorga". Arhitectura în Ploești, studiu istoric [Architecture in Ploești, historical study] (in Romanian). Vol. reference: 16725. Bucharest: Cartea Românească. The book contains many of the chapters written (by the architect) for Ploești's monograph by Mihail Sevastos.
- Mihail Sevastos (1937). Monografia orașului Ploești [Monograph of the City of Ploiești] (in Romanian). Bucharest: Cartea Românească.. Toma T. Socolescu is one of the authors of the monograph. He wrote the chapters on architecture, the central market halls, urban planning, the history of the city’s maps, as well as popular culture (visual artists, museums, and the 'Nicolae Iorga' library). The book also includes many of his drawings and watercolors.
- (in Romanian) Gabriela Petrescu (2024). ARHITECȚII SOCOLESCU 1840-1940, Studiu monografic [The Socolescu Architects 1840–1940, A Monographic Study] (in Romanian). Bucharest: Editura Simetria. ISBN 978-973-1872-55-1. Archived from the original on 2025-05-27.
- (in Romanian) Lucian Vasile (2016) [2014]. Orașul sacrificat. Al Doilea Război Mondial la Ploiești [The Sacrificed City: The Second World War in Ploiești] (in Romanian) (2nd ed.). Ploiești: Asociatia pentru Educatie si Dezvoltare Urbana. ISBN 978-973-0-21379-9.
- (in Romanian) Journal Analele Architecturei și ale Artelor cu care se légă, Publishing director: Ion N. Socolescu, Tipgografia Curtii Regale, F. Göbl & fils, Bucharest, published from 1890 to 1893.

== Other sources ==
- (in Romanian) Official documents from Romanian institutions, including the official Romanian newspaper (Monitorul Oficial).
- (in Romanian) Library of the Ion Mincu University of Architecture and Urban Planning.
- (in Romanian) Bucharest Carol I Central University Library.
- (France) and (Romania) Socolescu family archives (Paris, Bucarest) including a photographic collection.
- (in Romanian) Lucian Vasile, Historian, Senior Advisor at the National Council for the Study of the Securitate Archives (CNSAS) since 2025, former Expert and head of department at the Institute for the Investigation of Communist Crimes and the Memory of the Romanian Exile (IICCMER), president of the Association for Education and Urban Development (AEDU), author of the specialized site on the city of Ploiești and its history : RepublicaPloiesti.net.

== Notes and references ==
- (a) Toma T. Socolescu (1938). "Preface by Nicolae Iorga". Arhitectura în Ploești, studiu istoric [Architecture in Ploești, historical study] (in Romanian). Vol. reference: 16725. Bucharest: Cartea Românească..
- (b) Toma T. Socolescu (2004). Amintiri [Memories] (in Romanian). Bucharest: Caligraf Design. ISBN 973-86771-0-6.
- (c) Toma T. Socolescu (2004). Fresca arhitecților care au lucrat în România în epoca modernă 1800 - 1925 [Fresco of architects who worked in Romania in the modern era 1800 - 1925] (in Romanian). Bucharest: Editura Caligraf Design. ISBN 973-86771-1-4.
- (d) Mihail Sevastos (1937). Monografia orașului Ploești [Monograph of the City of Ploiești] (in Romanian). Bucharest: Cartea Românească.
- (e) Gabriela Petrescu (2024). ARHITECȚII SOCOLESCU 1840-1940, Studiu monografic [The Socolescu Architects 1840–1940, A Monographic Study] (in Romanian). Bucharest: Editura Simetria. ISBN 978-973-1872-55-1. Archived from the original on 2025-05-27.
- (f) RepublicaPloiesti.net, Lucian Vasile, historian, senior advisor at the National Council for the Study of the Securitate Archives (CNSAS) since 2025, former expert and head of department at the Institute for the Investigation of Communist Crimes and the Memory of the Romanian Exile (IICCMER), president of the Association for Education and Urban Development (AEDU), creator (August 2009) and author of the website dedicated to the city's history and architecture
- Other notes and references:
