= Midia oil terminal =

Midia Oil Terminal

Location
- Country: Romania
- Location: Constanța County

Details
- Opened: 2008
- Operated by: Rompetrol
- Owned by: KazMunayGas
- Type of harbour: Oil Terminal

Statistics
- Annual cargo tonnage: 170 Mbbl (~2.3×10^{7} t)

Midia Oil Terminal (Romanian: Terminalul petrolier Midia) is an oil import-export terminal located 8.6 km (5.3 mi) offshore the Port of Midia in Constanța County, Romania. It is one of the biggest oil terminals in the Black Sea that serves as a local hub for crude oil deliveries to the Romanian market. The terminal which started operations in 2008 belongs to the Rompetrol oil company which is owned by Kazakhstans national oil company KazMunayGas. The overall capacity of the import-export terminal is approximately 170 million barrels per annum (~2.3×10^{7} t/a) of oil but used capacity is around 30 million barrels per annum (~4.1×10^{6} t/a). Tanker loading capacity is suitable for Suezmax tankers up to 160,000 DWT. The terminal serves as a supplier for the nearby Petromidia Refinery also owned by Rompetrol.

The construction of the terminal started in 2006 and was completed by 2008 at a cost of US$150 million.
