= IPIP SA =

Romanian engineering institute for oil refineries

- Type: Private
- Industry: Engineering
- Founded: 1950
- Headquarters: Ploiești, Romania
- Products: Engineering and project management of petroleum industry infrastructure
- Number of employees: 200
- Website: www.ipip.ro IPIP Presentation IPIP LinkedIn

S.C. IPIP S.A. the Engineering and Design Institute for Oil Refineries and Petrochemical Plants is a Romanian company which was established in 1950, at Ploiești, as a milestone in the development of the petroleum, hydrocarbon processing and petrochemical industries as well as of their related fields, in Romania.

== History ==
For almost 50 years, not only in Romania but also in the southeast of Europe, IPIP SA was the only design institute for refineries and petrochemistry.

Right away after its foundation, IPIP worked in the service of the Romanian refineries damaged during the second war, fully contributing to their restoring.

Later, in the '70s, within the general frame of development of the Romanian industry, IPIP was in charge of designing new refineries of large capacity and high complexity, for the processing of the domestic and imported crude oil.

The institute has performed the engineering and design for the achievement and implementation of the new Romanian refineries and for the revamping and extension of the existent ones. Thus, IPIP has fully designed the 11 oil refineries of Romania, totaling a processing capacity of about 40,000,000 Mt/y, and many objectives abroad, spread worldwide and comprising, mainly, oil refineries, lube oil / gas processing complexes, oil terminal and other associated facilities.

IPIP SA has been audited and approved by Lloyd's Register Quality Assurance to the following Quality management System Standards: ISO 9001:2000, EN ISO 9001:2000, SR EN ISO 9001:2001, for Engineering, basic and detail design, project management, procurement, consultancy and technical assistance for oil refineries, gas processing and petrochemical plants, pipelines and related facilities. Design for indoor electrical systems for civil and industrial buildings, for 0.4 kV underground and above-ground branches. Design for 0.4-20 kV above-ground electrical lines or underground cable tray routing, and transformer substations.

== Fields of activity ==
- Refinery
- Petrochemical and Chemical
- Gas Processing / Treating
- Environmental
- Crude Oil / Product Storage
- Energy and Power
- Pipelines
- Chemical Equipment
- Offsite Facilities and Utilities Production Plants
- Industrial and Civil Constructions

== Services ==
The Expertise Power to Challenge the Future

- Engineering
- 3D Design
- EPCM

IPIP offers today a full range of services from the conceptual phases through on-stream operation, post start-up assistance and training. The activities of the Institute are focused on consulting services, conceptual, feasibility and viability studies, capital and operating cost estimates, project planning and management including EPCM and EPC project implementation, basic and detailed engineering for any related specialty, procurement, pre-commissioning and commissioning, start-up, current operation, field and shop inspection, preventive and routine maintenance, plant testing / analysis / optimization / revamping / retrofitting / expansion, general and on-the-job training, energy conservation, environmental protection systems, etc.

IPIP is focused on developing 3D design using Intergraph PDS software.

IPIP is able to perform Procurement and Construction Management at professional standards.

== Experiences ==
Along its history, IPIP has installed grassroots refineries as well as petrochemical and gas processing plants. The institute has engineered and put on stream more than 400 process units as well as a multitude of associated utilities, offsites and auxiliary facilities and have included also workshop drawings for refinery, petrochemical plant equipment and tank farms.

== See also ==
- Petrotel Lukoil Refinery
- Petrobrazi Refinery
- Arpechim Refinery
- Petromidia Refinery
- RAFO Onesti Refinery
- Rompetrol Refinery
- Indian Oil Corporation
  - Guwahati Refinery
  - Barauni Refinery
  - Haldia Refinery
