= Eurojet =

Eurojet may refer to:

- Eurojet Airlines (2003–2004), a French Airline
- Eurojet EJ200 a military turbofan, the powerplant of the Eurofighter Typhoon
- Eurojet Romania (2004), Airlines of Romania
- EuroJet Turbo GmbH, which makes the EJ200
