= Eurojet România =

Romanian charter airline

Eurojet Romania
IATA	ICAO	Call sign
-	RDP	JET-ARROW
- Founded: 2004
- Ceased operations: 2015
- Fleet size: 4
- Headquarters: Bucharest, Romania
- Key people: George Lupes
- Website: eurojet.ro

Eurojet Romania SRL was an independent business charter company headquartered in Bucharest, Romania.

== History ==
Eurojet Romania was established in 2004 when The Rompetrol Group - now known as KMG International - decided to create its own aviation division. Eurojet Romania became at the beginning of 2009 an independent business charter company. The company slogan was Wings for your dreams come true.

== Fleet ==
The Eurojet Romania fleet consisted of the following aircraft:

- 1 Bombardier Challenger 604
- 1 Cessna Citation Excel
