= Port of Midia =

Location
- Country: Romania
- Location: Constanța County
- Coordinates: 44.3367°N 28.6720°E
- UN/LOCODE: ROMID

Details
- Owned by: Compania Națională Administrația Porturilor Maritime Constanța
- Type of harbour: Natural/Artificial
- Size of harbour: 6 square kilometres
- Land area: 2.34 square kilometres
- Size: 834 acres (8.34 square kilometres)
- No. of berths: 14
- General manager: Constantin Matei

Statistics
- Annual cargo tonnage: 6.712.490 tonnes (2016)
- Website www.portofconstantza.com/midia

The Port of Midia is located on the Black Sea coastline, approx 13.5 NM north of Constanța.

It is one of the satellite ports of Constanța and was designed and built to serve the adjacent industrial and petrochemical facilities.

The north and south breakwaters have a total length of 6,97 km. The port covers 834 ha of which 234 ha is land and 600 ha is water. There are 14 berths (11 operational berths, 3 berths belong to the Constanța Shipyard) with a total length of 2,24 km.

Further to dredging operations performed the port depths are increased to 9 m at crude oil discharging berths 1–4, allowing access to tankers having an 8.5 m maximum draught and 20,000 DWT.

The Port of Midia is mainly used for the supply of crude oil for the nearby Petromidia Refinery.

== See also ==
- Poarta Albă–Midia Năvodari Canal
