= KMG International =

Romanian oil company

- Type: Joint-stock company
- Traded as: BVB: RRC BVB: PTR LSE: 0JK8 LSE: 0IZW
- Industry: Oil and gas
- Founded: 1974
- Headquarters: Bucharest, Romania (corporate headquarters); Amsterdam, Netherlands (registered office)
- Key people: Ilyas Kuldzhanov (Chief Executive Officer)
- Products: Fuels (Efix, EfixS), LPG Oils, Additives and Auto cosmetics, Lubricants, Services (Fill&Go, Hei), Filling stations (Rompetrol, Rompetrol Express, Rompetrol Partner)
- Revenue: ▲US$ 13.6 billion (2014)
- Number of employees: 7,100 (2015)
- Parent: KazMunayGas
- Website: www.kmginternational.com

KMG International N.V. (formerly known as The Rompetrol Group N.V.) is an international oil company with operations in 15 countries throughout Europe, Central Asia and North Africa. The group is active primarily in refining, marketing and trading, with additional operations in exploration and production, and other oil industry services such as drilling, EPCM, and transportation.

KMG International owns the largest and most modern refinery in Romania and the Black Sea region – Petromidia Navodari – which boasts a processing capacity of over five million tons per year.

The company's retail network that operates under the "Rompetrol" brand incorporates over 1000 fuel distribution points in Romania, Georgia, Bulgaria and Moldova.

As of 2010, the group is entirely owned by National Company KazMunayGas JSC, the national petroleum company of the Republic of Kazakhstan, in turn controlled by the National Welfare Fund Samruk-Kazyna JSC.

The company employs over 7100 people worldwide, of which around 6,000 in Romania.

Starting 2014, KMG International implemented a new strategy to consolidate and develop the activities and operations of the group in Romania and South-Eastern Europe.

== History ==
- 1974 – Rompetrol is established as the international operator of the Romanian oil industry.
- 1993 – Privatized by Management and Employee Buy Out (MEBO) and turnover subsequently reduced to below $6 million by 1998.
- 1998 – Control purchased by a local investor group, thus increasing company capital and contributing into a substantial turnover growth.
- 1999 – Holding company established as The Rompetrol Group N.V.(‘TRG’) in the Netherlands. First major acquisition: Vega refinery - located in Ploieşti - is bought and doubles its revenues in the first nine months after takeover.
- 2000 – Rompetrol takes over Petros - at that time Romania's principal oilfield operator. The company has since been renamed Rompetrol Well Services. The Group's largest acquisition, Petromidia S.A., is also Romania's largest and most sophisticated oil refinery. Rompetrol committed itself to a sustained modernization process to make Petromidia a state-of-the-art facility in Eastern and Central Europe.
- 2001 – Rompetrol creates Rominserv S.A., Romania's first Engineering Procurement Construction & Maintenance (EPCM) company focusing on the oil industry.
- 2002 – In 2002, with the newly founded company Rompetrol Petrochemicals in charge, the Petromedia refinery resumed its petrochemicals production.
- 2002 – Rompetrol opens subsidiaries in neighboring Moldova (Rompetrol Moldova) and Bulgaria (Rompetrol Bulgaria).
- 2003 – Rompetrol implemented its comprehensive program of expanding its gas station network in Romania. As part of its strategy the company unified the quality standards for its entire gas station network. To expand its network and make the process of distributing fuel easier, Rompetrol created a network of oil depots in various regions of the country (Arad, Craiova, Șimleu Silvaniei, Zarnesti, Vatra-Dornei, Constanta, Mogosoaia).
- 2004 – Rompetrol Rafinare S.A. is listed on Bucharest Stock Exchange (BVB).
- 2004 – KazMunayGas Trading AG (previously Vector Energy AG), specializing in the trade of oil and petroleum products.
- 2005 – Most significant Q1 results ever with net profit reaching $43 million. Rompetrol starts operations Georgia.
- 2005 – The Rompetrol Group N.V. announced the acquisition of 100% in the French company Dyneff S.A.
- 2006 – Rompetrol opens a subsidiary in Ukraine - Rompetrol Ukraine.
- 2007 – In August 2007, the Kazakh company KazMunayGas acquired 75% of the Rompetrol shares from Rompetrol Holding Switzerland
- 2008 – Rompetrol and KazMunayGas launched Media Marine Terminal for crude oil in Media Black Sea port.
- 2009 – KazMunayGas takes over the remaining 25% stake in Rompetrol.
- 2009 – In August 2009, Rompetrol opens its first two fuel stations, on the A2 motorway in Romania, designed as the new premium brand of the group.
- 2010 - 2011 – TRG Petrol A.S., the group's branch was established in Turkey with a view to expand the operations and enter new highly prospective markets.
- 2012 – Completion of Petromidia refinery modernization process following an investment of US$380 million.
- 2013 – New filling station concept launch. The new filling station concept comprises a modern design that combines 3D elements with color schemes to create a minimalistic, aerial and warm concept.
- 2014 – The Board of Directors passed a resolution whereby the group was renamed into KMG International N.V

== See also ==
- List of petroleum companies
