= Rompetrol =

Romanian oil and gas company

- Area served: Romania, Bulgaria, Moldova, Georgia
- Key people: Ilyas Kuldzhanov
- Parent: KMG International
- Website: Rompetrol.kmginternational.com

Rompetrol is a crude oil development, producer, and refiner based in Romania. It also markets and distributes refined petroleum products through its chain of gasoline and diesel fuel stations. Established as a state-owned company in 1974, it was privatized in 1993 and became a subsidiary of KMG International in 2007. It has operations in 12 countries, where it is known as The Rompetrol Group N.V.

== History ==
Rompetrol was established in 1974 as the operator of the Romanian oil industry.

The company was privatized in 1993 through a Management and Employee Buyout (MEBO). In 1998, Rompetrol was purchased by a local investor group led by Dinu Patriciu. In 1999, the company's new holding was established as The Rompetrol Group N.V.(TRG) in the Netherlands. The new group made its first acquisition in the same year by buying the Vega refinery in Ploiești.

In 2000, Rompetrol took over Petros (renamed Rompetrol Well Services), then Romania's principal oilfield operator. The following year, Rompetrol acquired Petromidia S.A., Romania's largest refinery. Rompetrol committed itself to a sustained modernization process to make Petromidia a state-of-the-art facility in Eastern and Central Europe. In 2001, Rompetrol created Rominserv S.A., Romania's first Engineering Procurement Construction & Maintenance (EPCM) company focused on the oil industry. In 2002, the Petromedia refinery resumed its petrochemicals production under the management of the newly-founded Rompetrol Petrochemicals.

In 2002, Rompetrol opened subsidiaries in neighboring Moldova (Rompetrol Moldova) and Bulgaria (Rompetrol Bulgaria). The following year, in Romania, Rompetrol started to expand its gas station network. As part of its strategy, the company unified the quality standards for its entire petrol station network. To expand its network and make the process of distributing fuel easier, Rompetrol created a network of oil depots in various regions of the country (Arad, Craiova, Șimleu Silvaniei, Zarnesti, Vatra-Dornei, Constanta, Mogosoaia). In 2004, Rompetrol Rafinare S.A. was listed on the Bucharest Stock Exchange (BVB). In 2005, Rompetrol started operations in Georgia and announced the acquisition of 100% of the French company Dyneff S.A. In 2006, Rompetrol opened a subsidiary in Ukraine (Rompetrol Ukraine). By 2006, Rompetrol had a turnover of US$6 billion.

In August 2007, the Kazakh company KazMunayGas acquired 75% of the Rompetrol shares from Rompetrol Holding Switzerland, and the remaining 25% stake in Rompetrol in 2009. In 2008, Rompetrol and KazMunayGas launched Media Marine Terminal for crude oil in the Media Black Sea port. In August 2009, Rompetrol opened its first two fuel stations on the A2 motorway in Romania, designed as the new premium brand of the group

In 2009, the company decided to outsource its IT needs but contracted only a single outsourcer with a multimillion dollar deal. In 2010-2011, Rompetrol was established in Turkey (RG Petrol A.S.). The Petromidia refinery modernization process was completed in 2012 following an investment of US$380 million. A new filling station concept was launched in 2013.

In 2014, the Rompetrol Group N.V. was renamed into KMG International N.V. as part of a strategy to promote the brand KazMunayGas. Although the name was changed into KMG International, the Rompetrol brand continues to be used in the distribution segment of the entire company. The company's retail network that operates under the “Rompetrol” brand incorporates over 1,100 fuel distribution points in Romania, Georgia, Bulgaria, Moldova, in France and Spain, where the company operates also under Dyneff brand.

In 2015-2016, CEFC China Energy and KazMunayGaz agreed for CEFC China Energy to take over 51% stake in KMG International, the former Rompetrol Group, but by July 2018 the deal fell apart due to the difficult financial situation of the Chinese company.

In May 2017, Rompetrol invested $10 millions to develop hybrid gas stations.

By March 2018, KazMunayGaz's international business, KMGI, owned Petromidia (Rompetrol Rafinare), which in turn operated the biggest refinery in Romania, as well as Romanian gas stations as well as in other countries. Also in March 2018, it was reported that a deal for KazzMunayGaz to sell a majority stake in Rompetrol to CEFC, a Chinese energy company, had "fallen apart." Shares of Rompetrol Rafinare were suspended on the Bucharest Stock Exchange after dropping 4.6% at the news. Previously, the deal to sell 51% of the company had been agreed on in December 2016, with the deal still on in early March 2018 despite the chairman of CEFC being under investigation for suspected economic crimes.

On March 6 or 7, 2022, according to a note to investors, Rompetrol faced a "complex cyber attack," although it stated operations at the Petromidia refinery were not affected. In May 2022, Rompetrol was the largest company in Georgia's fuel market. Its network of gas stations operated in Georgia, Romania, the Republic of Moldova, Bulgaria, and Georgia.

After having a loss of US$129 million in 2021, Rompetrol Rafinare had a profit of US$90 million in 2022. It was the largest refinery in Romania at that time, and was controlled by KazMunaygas through KMG International. In March 2023, Rompetrol opened three KFC restaurants in its gas stations on the A1 highway in Romania. They were the first KFC restaurants in Rompetrol stations through a franchise system operated by Sphera Franchise Group.

== See also ==
- List of petroleum companies
