= Petromidia Refinery =

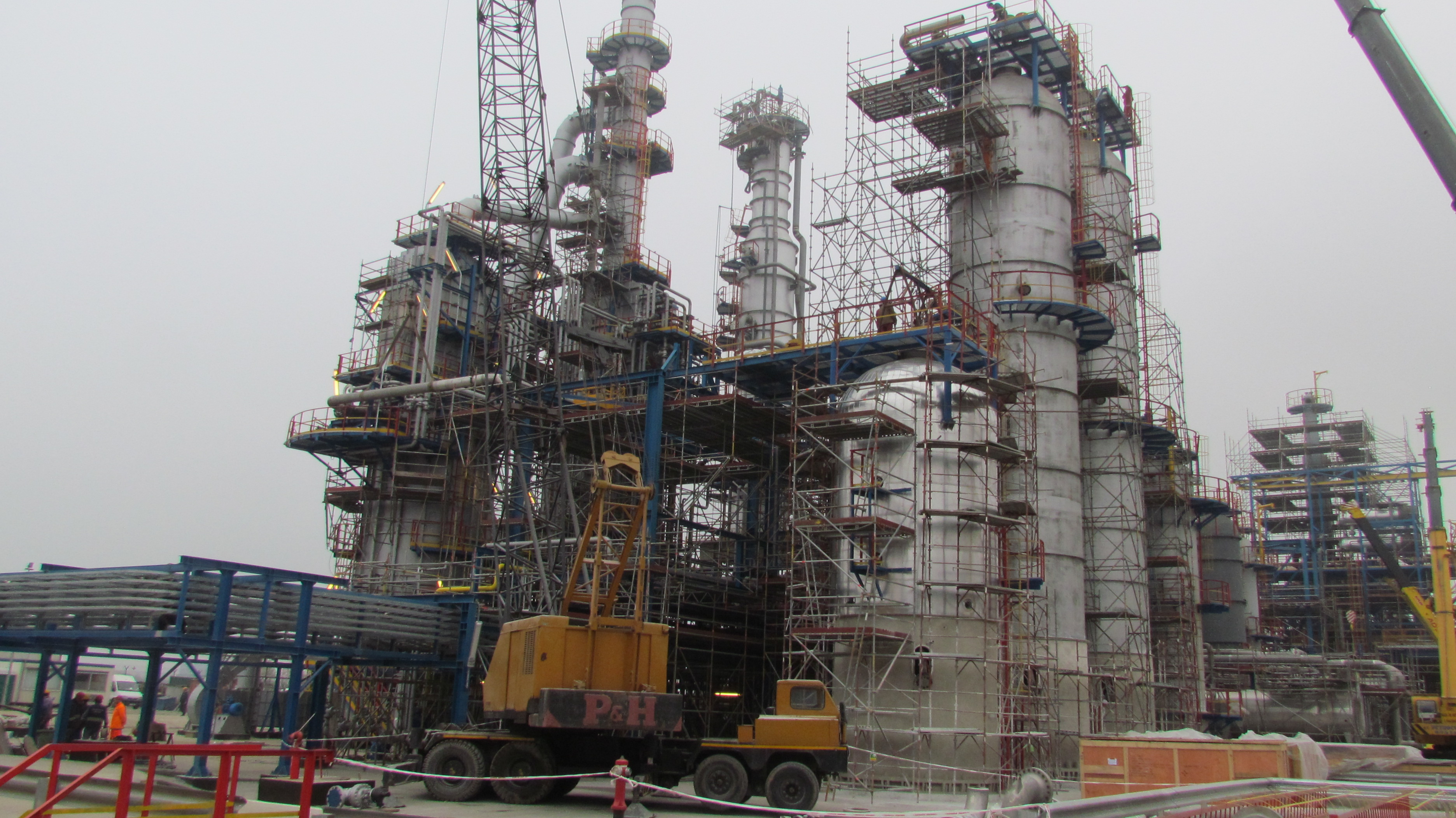
- Refinery
- Interactive map of the Petromidia Refinery area

General information
- Type: Oil refinery
- Location: Năvodari, Constanța County
- Coordinates: 44.34043°N 28.6555°E
- Elevation: 12 m (39 ft)
- Completed: 1975
- Owner: Rompetrol

Height
- Height: 200 metres (chimney)

Technical details
- Floor area: 480 hectares (51,666,770 ft^{2})

Petromidia Refinery is the largest Romanian oil refinery and one of the largest in Eastern Europe, located in Năvodari, Constanța County. It has an annual processing capacity of 4.8 million tonnes/year or 100,000 bbl/d (16,000 m^{3}/d). The refinery is supplied with oil through an oil terminal located in the Port of Midia that could accommodate ships up to 24,000 DWT or by a pipeline of 40 km (25 mi) which had a terminus in the Port of Constanța.

== History ==
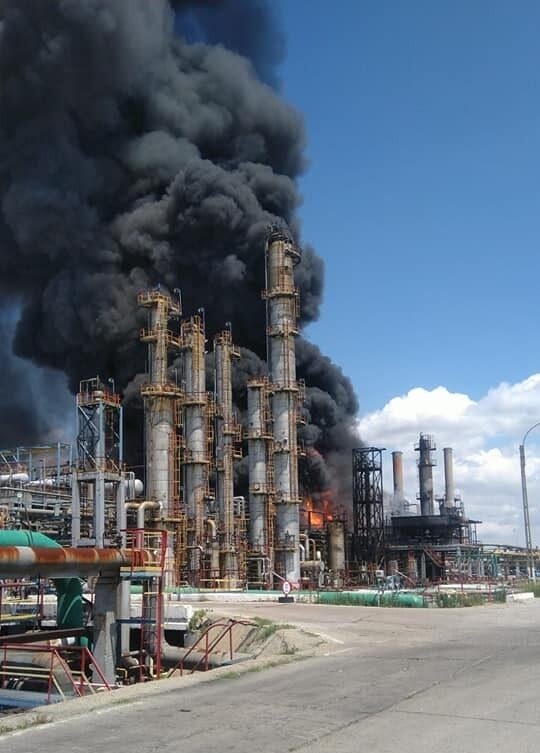
Image of the Petromidia Refinery after the 2021 explosion

The refinery was founded in 1975 as the Midia Năvodari Petrochemical Factory on a 480 ha (52,000,000 sq ft) plot of land located in Năvodari, Constanța County. The design and construction of the complex took two years and was based on Romanian technology and foreign licenses. Its launch was spurred by the 1973 oil crisis, following which Romanian dictator Nicolae Ceaușescu met with Mohammad Reza Pahlavi of Iran. The two agreed that Iran would become Romania’s supplier of crude oil, while Romania would send arms and security specialists. The arrangement involving cheap oil soon ended with the Iranian Revolution, forcing Romania to seek unsatisfactory deals with African countries. In 1991 the Midia Năvodari Petrochemical Factory was transformed into a joint stock company and the name was changed to SC Petromidia SA.

Between 1997 and 2000 the state tried to privatise the company several times. The first procedure was undertaken in 1997 and negotiations were held with a consortium made by South Korean Daewoo, Swiss company Glencore, and Petromidia USA (local representative of the Windmill company). Between July 1998 and January 1999 a new round of negotiations were finalised and the Turkish company Akmaya was chosen as a strategic investor, offering a per share price of US$ 10.1. On November 1, 2000, the Romanian Property Fund (Romanian: Fondul Proprietății de Stat) sold a stake of 69,991% of the complex to Rompetrol Group BV Rotterdam at a price of US$ 50.517 million, equivalent to US$ 2 per share. The value of the transaction was US$ 615 million, of which US$ 225 million was for modernisation works and other investments and US$ 340 million was for various debts (US$ 169 million for debts to the state and US$ 171 million to banks and other creditors) . Rompetrol also changed the name of the refinery to Rompetrol Rafinare. In April 2004 Rompetrol Rafinare was listed on the Bucharest Stock Exchange under the symbol RRC. Soon it became one of the most important listed companies and in December 2004 it was included in the BET 10 index.

In 2003 the refinery was named Refinery of the Year in Central and Eastern Europe by the World Refining Association.

On 2 July 2021, the refinery suffered an explosion which killed one person and left five others injured. Some 50 firefighters were deployed on the zone following the incident. The explosion happened at about 15 kilometres (9.3 miles) from one of Romania's most popular tourist resorts, Mamaia, located on the Black Sea. However, the Ministry of Internal Affairs of Romania said the city of Năvodari was not in danger but advised its inhabitants to keep their windows closed and announced that some of the smoke that was reaching the coast did so on beaches with not many people.

== Refining capacity ==
Petromidia is the only Romanian refinery located on the Black Sea shore, thus having the advantage of being supplied directly through the Midia oil terminal located in the Port of Midia capable of receiving oil tankers up to 24,000 DWT or the 40 km (25 mi) pipeline starting in the Port of Constanța. The refinery has an annual processing capacity of 4.8 million tonnes/year, or 100,000 bbl/d (16,000 m^{3}/d), and storage facilities for up to 400,000 m^{3} of oil.

== See also ==
- Petrochemical industry in Romania
