= Mihail Sevastos =

Romanian poet, prose writer, memoirist and translator

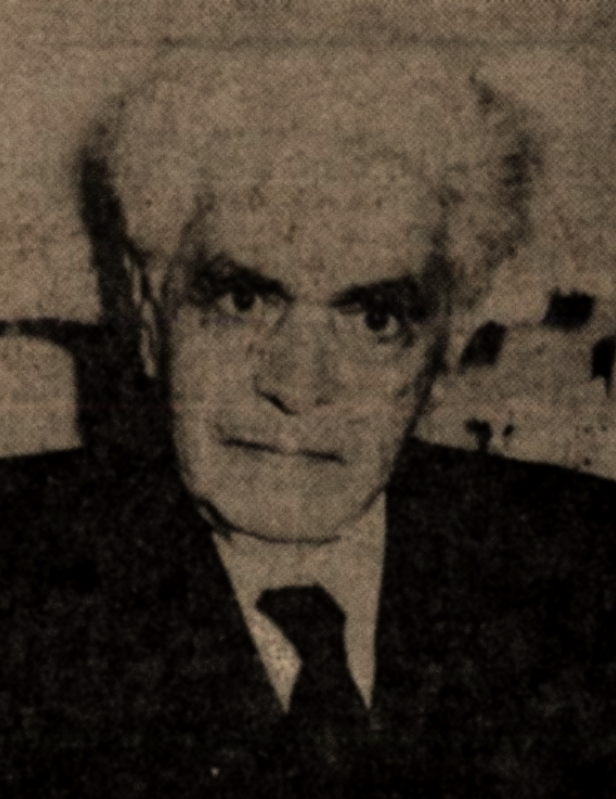
Sevastos in June 1967

Mihail Sevastos (born Ionel Mihai Sevastos; August^{[a]} 1892 – September 24, 1967) was a Romanian poet, prose writer, memoirist and translator.

Born in Botoșani, his parents were the poet Artur Stavri, whose name does not appear on his son's birth or death certificates, and the folklorist Elena Didia Odorica Sevastos. He attended primary school in Iași from 1898 to 1902. Between 1902 and 1910, he studied at the city's Costache Negruzzi Boarding High School, passing through the lower and then upper divisions, classical section. Sevastos then enrolled in the law faculty of Iași University. In 1911, he was hired as a proofreader at Viața Românească, later advancing to editing secretary.

Sevastos' first published poem was "Cântecul ciobănașului Nacu" (1908). His first volume of poetry, Rime sprintene (1920), was followed much later by Cronici rimate (1963) and Versuri (1967). He edited Adevărul literar și artistic between 1925 and 1939. He published two magazines: Teatrul from 1912 to 1913, together with George Topîrceanu; and Torța in 1945. He was editor-in-chief of Lumea-Bazar magazine. Sevastos' contributions appeared in Cuvântul liber, Convorbiri Critice, Facla, Mișcarea, Rampa, Lumea, Lumea literară și artistică, Cronica, Adevărul, Dreptatea, Flacăra, Însemnări literate, Dimineața, Seara and Opinia. Pen names he used include Cronicar, Proletar, Rinaldo, Reinaldo, Yacassa and M. Sever. Among the authors he translated are Anton Chekhov, Alexander Serafimovich, Mikhail Sholokhov, Leo Tolstoy, Ivan Turgenev and Gleb Uspensky.

His novels were Aventurile din strada Grădinilor (1934) and Camioneta verde (1938), along with Documente omenești, which appeared posthumously in 1970. Sevastos' prose is that of an industrious journalist, sensitized to human tragicomedy, a "collector of human documents" incapable of cultivating a pure epic. An "objective and impartial" witness, he remains the memoirist of the prestigious Viața Românească group. His recollections were published in 1956 as Amintiri de la „Viața Românească”, reworked in a second edition of 1966.

== Notes ==
=== Footnote ===
The standard date given is August 2, but August 6 and 8 have also been proposed. The birth certificate reads, "the date is not known".
