= Cornești, Dâmbovița =

Cornești
- Commune
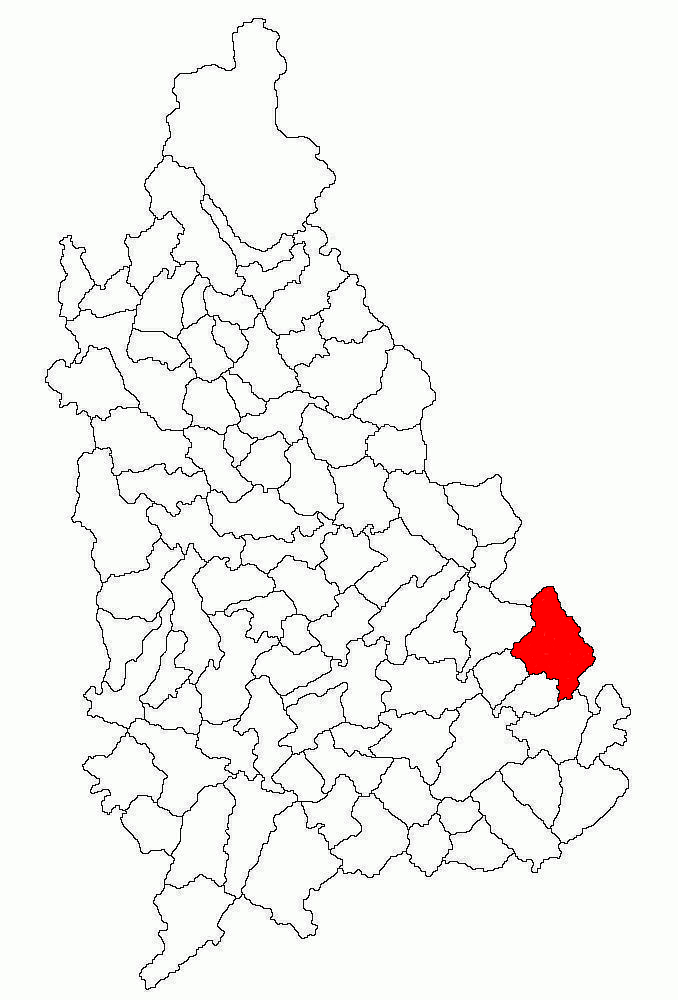
- Location in Dâmbovița County

- Location in Romania
- Coordinates: 44°47′N 25°52′E
- Country: Romania
- County: Dâmbovița

Government
  - Mayor (2024–2028): Bogdan-Gheorghe Guță (ADU)
- Area: 66.29 km^{2} (25.59 sq mi)
- Elevation: 143 m (469 ft)
- Population (2021-12-01): 6,249
  - Density: 94/km^{2} (240/sq mi)
- Time zone: EET/EEST (UTC+2/+3)
- Postal code: 137150
- Area code: +(40) 245
- Vehicle reg.: DB
- Website: www.comunacornesti.ro

Cornești is a commune in Dâmbovița County, Muntenia, Romania with a population of 6,249 people as of 2021. It is composed of ten villages: Bujoreanca, Cătunu, Cornești, Cristeasca, Crivățu, Frasinu, Hodărăști, Ibrianu, Postârnacu, and Ungureni.

Historical population
Year	Pop.	±%
2002	7,710	—
2011	7,142	−7.4%
2021	6,249	−12.5%
Source: Census data
