= Duță =

Duță is a Romanian-language surname that may refer to:

- Adrian Duță (b. 1953), Romanian politician, MP (1990–1992; 1992–1996)
- Laurențiu Duță (b. 1976), Romanian singer and songwriter (3rei Sud Est)
- Steluța Duță (b. 1982), Romanian boxer
- Vasile Duță (1955–2016), Romanian politician, Senator (2000–2004)
