= Toma N. Socolescu =

Romanian architect (1848–1897)

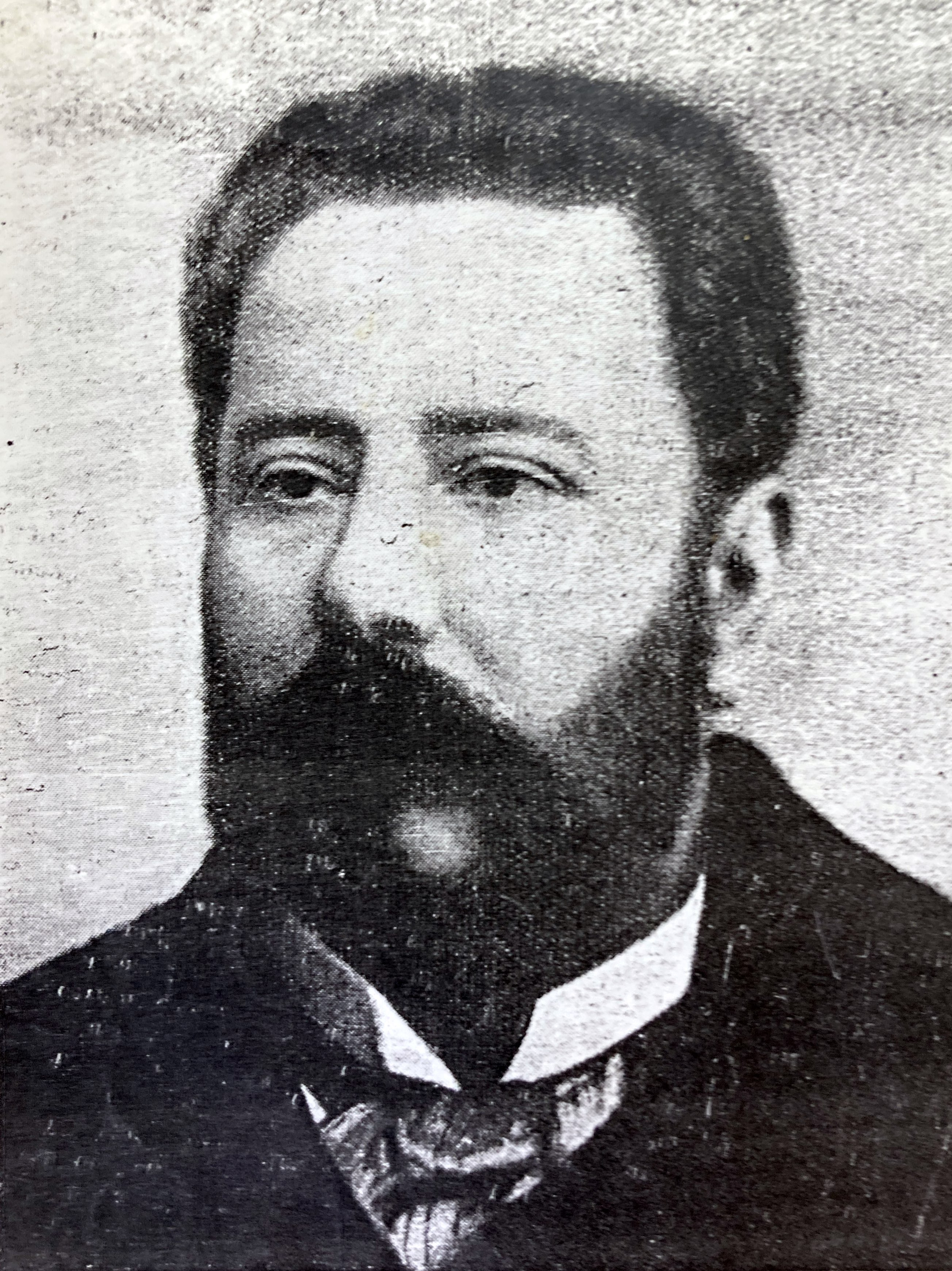
- Toma N. Socolescu in his thirties.
- Born: 1848; Ploiești, Principality of Wallachia
- Died: 12 November 1897 (aged 48–49); Ploiești, Kingdom of Romania
- Resting place: Bellu Cemetery, Bucharest
- Citizenship: (Romania) Romanian
- Education: The National School of Fine Arts
- Occupation: Architect
- Years active: 1870-1897
- Spouse: Alexandrina Nicolau
- Children: Toma T. Socolescu
- Parent(s): Niculae Gheorghe Socol, Ioana Săndulescu
- Relatives: Ion N. Socolescu, brother
- Awards: Member of the Order of the Crown of Romania to the rank of Knight
- Practice: Architecture, urban planning, civil construction, painter.
- Buildings: Sfantu Vîneri and Sfinții Împărați churches, municipal baths of Ploiești, Cuza-Vodă barracks of Bucharest
- Projects: Realization of the first topographic map of Ploiești in 1882.
- Design: Neoclassical architecture

Toma N. Socolescu (Ploiești, 1848 - Ploiești, November 22, 1897) was an important Romanian Neoclassical architect of the mid-to-late 19th century. He was the first Romanian-trained architect in Prahova County and played a major role in the town planning of Ploiești. He built numerous public works in his Județ of Prahova, while also having the distinction of having practised as a building contractor. He executed his own plans as well as those of other architects.

== Biography ==
Born in 1848 in Ploiești, the son of Niculae Gheorghe Socol, a prominent neoclassical architect in the Județ of Prahova, he was the only Romanian architect working in Prahova county at the time, other architects being of foreign origin. Builder of numerous public and official buildings in the county, as well as churches and remarkable private residences, several of which are listed as part of Romania's architectural heritage, he also served as the city architect of Ploiești from 1880 (Note: pp. 26 and 28.) and as a master builder. He built most of his structures after drawing up all the plans. According to his son, Toma T. Socolescu, he himself manufactured the materials needed for construction. From 1883 to 1886, he housed the School of Trades and Arts, where the sons of the town's builders were trained in the building trades, in its own house. (Note: pp. 28 and 30.) Toma T. Socolescu, recalls in his memoirs his extreme closeness to the craftsmen, who consider him one of their own.

Thus, as a master builder and contractor, carrying out the designs of other architects, he built schools, hospitals, high schools, and barracks.

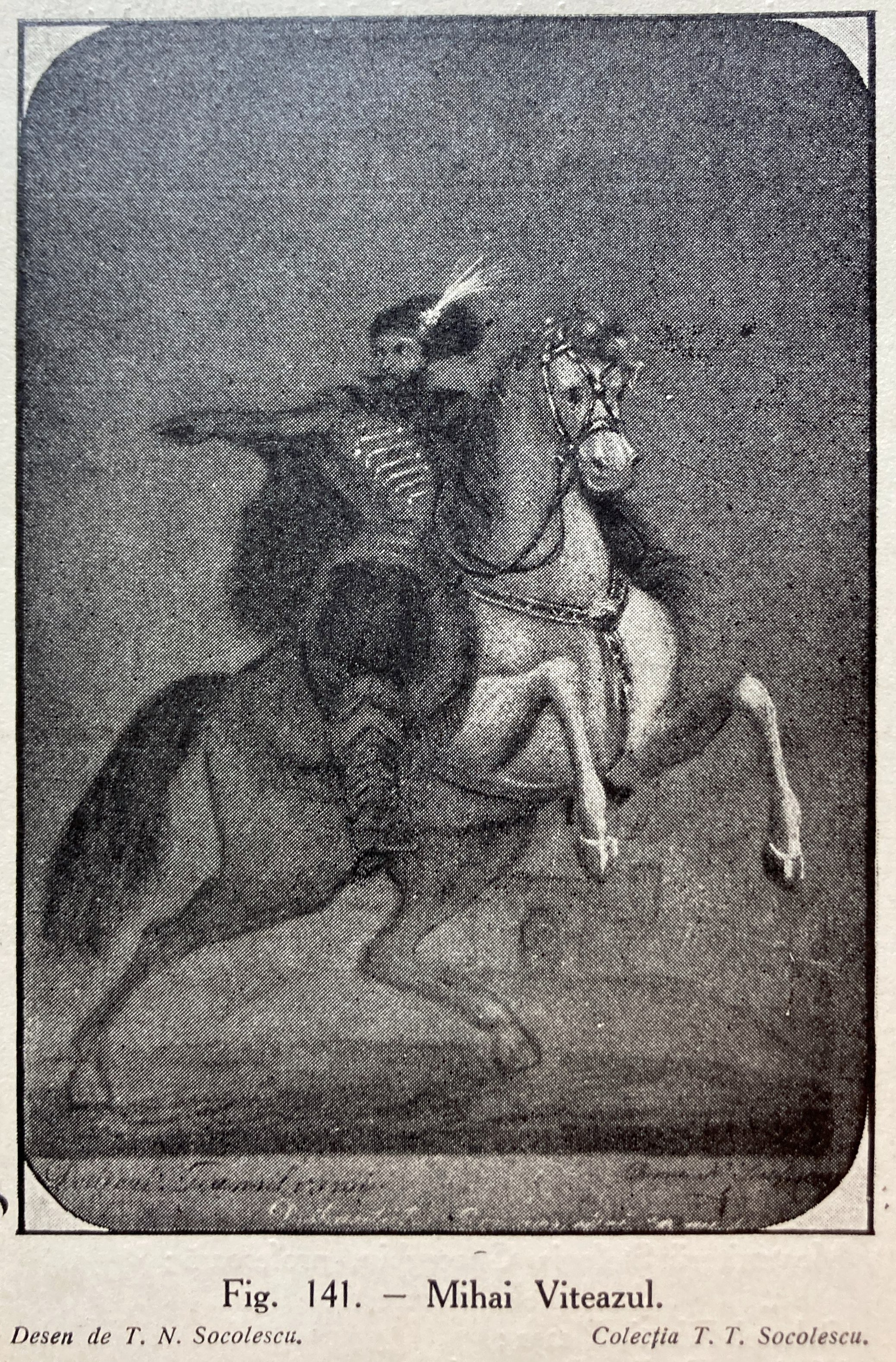
Michael the Brave drawing by Toma N. Socolescu.

A tireless worker, he also possessed a strong artistic sensibility. A skilled draftsman and watercolorist, he also enjoyed creating and crafting decorative handmade objects in glazed terracotta, as well as traditional Romanian stoves, in his own home. (Note: p. 106.) (Note: p. 215.) One of his watercolors and one of his drawings—Michael the Brave on horseback—are held at the Ploiești Art Museum. Originally from Transylvania, and in homage to the founding of the city by Michael the Brave, the architect adorned many of his buildings with a pediment featuring a bas-relief of the Prince. (Note: pp. 194-195.)

He was very close to his youngest brother, the architect Ion N. Socolescu, whom he supported financially throughout his architecture studies at the École des Beaux-Arts in Paris. He left Ploiești with his entire family for Bucharest in 1896 not only to oversee the major construction of the Cuza-Vodă barracks but also to maintain constant contact with the Society of Architects, of which he was a founding member. He settled not far from his brother Ion's house, at 29 Carol Boulevard.

He was one of about twenty signatories, including Ion Mincu, of a petition addressed to the Prime Minister requesting the creation of a Historic Monuments Commission aimed at protecting and preserving Romania's architectural heritage. The petition was published in the journal Annals of Architecture in May 1890.

In the last years of his life, he became involved in the oil industry and owned an oil derrick in the commune of Buștenari, in Prahova County. In partnership with Toma Rucăreanu, he personally built a gas factory called "Lumina," next to the South railway station in Ploiești.

He died at the age of 48 on November 22, 1897, in Ploiești, having accomplished a substantial body of work, despite the premature end of his professional career. He is buried in the Socolescu family vault at Bellu Cemetery in Bucharest.

=== Education and travels ===
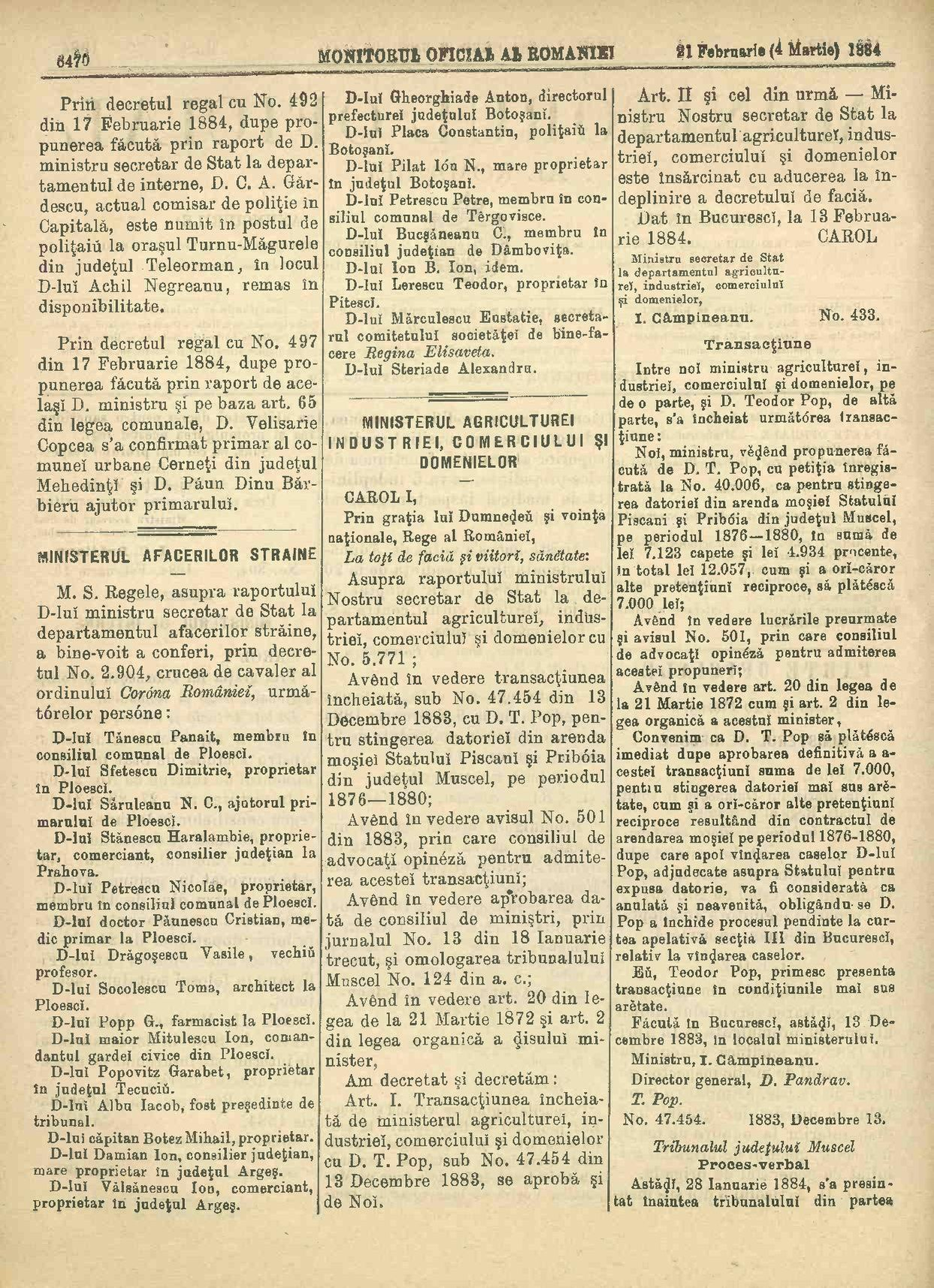
Royal Decree no. 2904 appointing Toma N. Socolescu, published in the Romanian Official Monitor on February 21, 1884, p. 6470.

He studied architecture in the department led by architects Alexandru Orăscu and Carol Benesch (or Carol Beniş) at the School of Fine Arts- Bucharest. At the request of Vasile Urechea Alexandrescu, then Minister of National Education, Theodor Aman, director of the School of Fine Arts, painter and major player in the Romanian cultural renaissance, awarded him a merit-based scholarship. He enrolled in the school on December 23, 1867, and completed his studies in 1870, (Note: p. 195.) after receiving a classical academic education. His diploma is signed by King Carol I himself. (Note: p. 187.) Romanian architects were then trained in the spirit of classical architecture. Neoclassicism was adopted in Wallachia and Moldavia as early as the 18th century, and it would endure until the end of the 19th century.

Very active and eager to learn, he undertook two one-month study trips to France and Italy, the first during the winter of 1893–1894.Very active and eager to learn, he undertook two-month-long study trips to France and Italy, the first in the winter of 1893-1894. (Note: Travel notes reported by his son Toma T., pp. 19-20.) He visited his brother, Ion N. Socolescu, who was then an architecture student at the École des Beaux-Arts in Paris. His train journey continued to Marseille, Nice, Monte Carlo, and then to Italy—Genoa, Rome, and Naples—where he explored Pompeii and Herculaneum. On his way back, he visited Venice. In 1896, he undertook one final journey, this time with his wife, to northern Italy. He visited Milan, then Nice again, and continued by train to Paris. He passed through Vienna before arriving in Ploiești on February 13, 1896.

=== Public offices, titles and responsibilities ===
- President of the Ploiești builders' society.
- City architect of Ploiești from 1880. (Note: pp. 138, 196, 607-608.)
- Founding member of the Society of Romanian Architects, created around February 16, 1891. He was the only one of the founders to practice architecture in Ploiești. (Note: List of all founding members : Alexandru Orăscu, first chairman; Carol Benesch; Mihai Capuţineanu; Gheorghe Duca; Alexandru Săvulescu; Ioan N. Socolescu; Dumitru Mamairol; Gheorghe Mandrea; Ion Mincu; Grigore P. Cerchez; Ştefan Ciocârlan; N. P. Cerchez; Toma N. Socolescu; Grigore Călinescu; N. Stavrolea; Filip Montureanu; Filip Xenopol; Nicolae Gabrielescu ; George Sterian; I Constantinescu; P. Petriccu; R. Nedelescu; F. Thyr; C. Stravrolea - p. 50.)
- Judicial expert in construction, at the Prahova County Court, around 1890 around 1890.
- Awarded the Knight's Cross of the Order of the Crown of Romania on February 21, 1884.

=== Genealogy ===
The Socol family of Berivoiul-Mare, formerly part of Făgăraș or Țara Făgărașului is a branch of the Socol family of Muntenia, which lived in the county of Dâmbovița. A 'Socol', great boyar and son-in-law of Mihai Viteazul (1557–1601), had two religious foundations in Dâmbovița county, still existing, Cornești and Răzvadu de Sus. He built their churches and another one in the suburb of Târgoviște. This boyar married Marula, daughter of Tudora din Popești, also known as Tudora din Târgșor, sister of Prince Antonie-Vodă. Marula was recognized by Mihai Viteazul as his illegitimate daughter, following an extra-marital liaison with Tudora. Marula is buried in the church of Răzvadu de Sus, where, on a richly carved stone slab, her name can be read.

Nicolae Iorga, the great Romanian historian and friend of Toma T. Socolescu, found Socol ancestors among the founders of the City of Făgăraș in the 12th century. (Note: Note 8 - p. 15.) In 1655, the Prince of Transylvania George II Rákóczi ennobled an ancestor of Nicolae G. Socol: "Ștefan Boier din Berivoiul Mare, and through him his wife Sofia Spătar, his son Socoly, and their heirs and descendants of whatever sex, to be treated and regarded as true and undeniable NOBLEMEN.", (Note: pp. 8 and 9 - Extract from the ennoblement deed of July 14, 1655.) in gratitude for his services as the Prince's courier in the Carpathians, a function "which he fulfilled faithfully and steadfastly for many years, and especially in these stormy times [...]". (Note: p. 14 - Toma T. Socolescu writes: "My grandfather, Nicolae Gh. Socolescu, also an architect, having finished his studies in Vienna, was a descendant of a family that, through a distant ancestor, had obtained a noble rank, in 1655, from G. Rakoczy. The original document written in calfskin, in Latin, with gold letters and the family emblem in colors, laced and bearing the princely seal in red wax, is in the possession of Major S. Socol, former mayor of the city of Făgăraș, where he lives." (Translated from Romanian)) Around 1846, five Socol (Note: p. 14 - Toma T. Socolescu writes : "N. G. Socolescu (Socol, in Ardeal) came to Muntenia from the Berivoiu Mare commune, located at the foot of the mountains in the Făgăraș region, and settled in Ploiesti, together with his five other brothers, - around the revolution, around 1846, - namely in Sf. Spiridon outskirts. During my childhood and until later, there was his house in Culea Căleni, a ground-floor house, square-shaped, set back from the street and surrounded by a garden. He married Ioana, born Săndulescu, from the same suburb, and his name appears among the founders in the parish registers; and as was customary at the time, I believe he was also buried there - although the searches I made were unsuccessful - in 1872." (Translated from Romanian)) come to Muntenia, from Berivoiu Mare, in the territory of Făgăraș.

"Five brothers crossed the mountains, all builders, from the Făgăraș region, a village at the foot of the mountains, Berivoiul-Mare, where the name of Socol is still widespread today, and where one of their ancestors is said to have come from Munténie, namely from the region of Târgoviște, which is the home of the Socol family, being to this day, near Târgovişte, Valea lui Socol (the Socol Valley), as well as their two founding churches, in Răzvadu de Sus and Cornești. (Note: translation of an extract from page 37.) (Note: translation of an extract from page 177.)"

One of the brothers was architect Nicolae Gh. Socol (??-1872). He settled in Ploiești around 1840-1845, and named himself Socolescu. He married Iona Săndulescu, from the Sfantu Spiridon suburb. He had a daughter (died in infancy) and four sons, (Note: pp. 105-106.) (Note: pp. 214-215.) two of whom became major architects: Toma N. Socolescu and Ion N. Socolescu. The lineage of architects continues with Toma T. Socolescu, and his son Toma Barbu Socolescu.

The historian, cartographer and geographer Dimitrie Papazoglu evokes, in 1891, (Note: p. 17 - Dimitrie Papazoglu, Istoria fondărei orașului București, București, Curtea Veche, 2005, p. 59.) the presence of Romanian boyars of the first rank Socoleşti, in Bucharest, descendants of Socol from Dâmbovița. Finally, Constantin Stan also refers, in 1928, to the precise origin of Nicolae Gheorghe Socol :

"At the foot of the Carpathians, on the right bank of the stream of the same name, lies the commune of Berivoiul-Mare [...], one of the oldest villages in the Olt household [...]. The inhabitants are composed of serfs and former boyars. [...], and the Romanian boyar families were: Socol, Boyer, Sinea and Răduleț, soldiers with border guard privileges.[...] The G. Streza Socol family gave birth to Nicolae Socol, a graduated architect from Vienna, who settled in the town of Ploeşti with several of his brothers around the middle of the last century. (Note: translation from Romanian of extracts from passages quoted on page 17 - Constantin Stan, Şcoala poporană din Făgăraş şi depe Târnave, Volumul.I, Făgăraşul. Sibiu, Tiparul institutului de arte Grafice “Dacia Traiană”, 1928, p. 150-152.)"

Family tree

Niculae Gheorghe Socol (~1820-1872) architect	Ioana Săndulescu
Alexandrina Nicolau (1860–1900)	Toma N. Socolescu (1848–1897) architect and builder in Ploiești	Nicolae N. Socolescu timber merchant	Ghiță N. Socolescu artist painter, dead during his graduate studies	Ion N. Socolescu (1856–1924) architect
Florica Tănescu (1887-1969)	Toma T. Socolescu (1883–1960) professor-architect	Florica T. Socolescu	Smaranda T. Socolescu	Ioan T. Socolescu	Coralia-Ioana-Margareta T. Socolescu
Mircea Socolescu (1907–1978) settled in France in 1945, married without children	Toma Gheorghe Barbu Socolescu (1909–1977) professor-architect	Irena Gabriela Vasilescu (1910–1993) artist painter, teacher
Mihai Ștefan Marc Socolescu (1942–1994) teacher	Maria Lois (1942-2021) teacher
Laura Socolescu (1967) settled in France – artist-choreographer, dancer

== Architectural and urban planning achievements ==
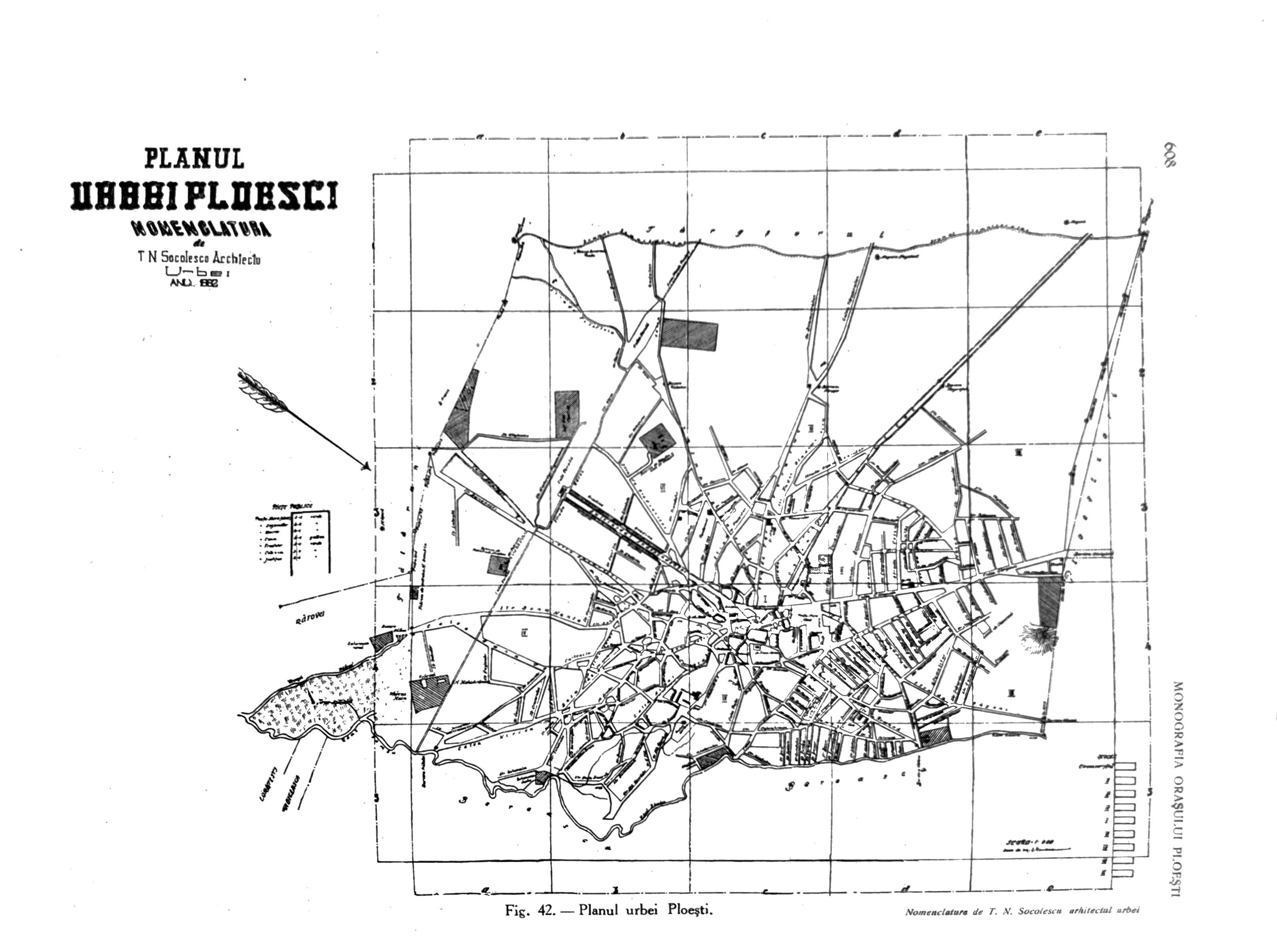
First topographical plan of the city of Ploiești drawn up by the chief architect Toma N. Socolescu, in 1883.

Toma N. Socolescu began his career as an architect and a master builder in his hometown in 1870. He designs the plans and carries out the construction of all types of buildings: private houses, public buildings, factories, churches, and other structures. As the city architect of Ploiești, he created the first topographical plan of the city in 1882: Planul urbei Ploesci, nomenclatura, by Toma N. Socolescu, architectu, URBEI, Anu 1882. (Note: In 1938, Toma T. Socolescu wrote: Architect of the town hall, he drew up the first complete plan of the town, with street nomenclature - non-existent until then - as we shall see in the chapter on the history of the town plan "Building and town planning", a plan approved at the town council meeting of January 9, 1882, the mayor then being Constantin. T. Grigorescu, p. 56.) (Note: pp. 196 and 607-608.)

He contributed to the creation of the new large boulevard of independence (Bulevardul Independenţei) linking the brand-new South Railway Station (Gară de Sud) to the city center. The route was determined in 1871 by the town council after much dithering and reversals. Socolescu resumed the work of Cristian Kertsch, the architect who had drawn up the expropriation plan for the project. The boulevard will become the city's main artery.

In 1830, the town of Ploiești had no official, public buildings, schools, or hospitals. Public services were housed in private premises rented for the purpose, often unfit for the purpose. (Note: p. 185.) Everything still had to be built. Toma N. Socolescu thus played a key role in the construction and planning of public buildings.

The city owes him most of its public official buildings from the 19th and early 20th centuries. (Note: pp. 30, 31, 33 and 37.) Most of these would remain standing until 1944. Some, particularly the churches, are still visible today.

=== In Ploiești ===
==== Churches, public buildings and artworks ====
- Plans and building of Sfânta Vineri church of Ploiești, between 1875 and 1880, located at 12, strada Neagoe Basarab. It is in neoclassical style, also marked by the influence of contemporary German Baroque. (Note: p. 154.) The three traditional-style towers are of Russian inspiration. Many Russian soldiers, present during the Russo-Turkish conflict, contributed to its construction. It survived despite extensive damage from the 1940 earthquake and 1977, as well as the American bombing raids of 1944. Reconsolidated in 1998, the church is a listed historic monument. Its inside walls are frescoed by the painter Gheorghe Tattarescu, (Note: pp. 15 and 92.) (Note: pp. 155 and 818.) then spelled: Tătărăscu.
- Plans of Viișoara cemetery chapel in 1880, when the cemetery bearing the same name was founded.
- Plans and construction of Sfinţii Împărați Constantin și Elena church, from 1894, (Note: p. 757.) located at the intersection of Ion Luca Caragiale, Take Ionescu and Mărășești streets. The architect was inspired by the Episcopal church of Curtea de Argeș, known at the time as the most beautiful monument in the country (Note: pp. 151, 757-758.) but also by the style of his brother Ion N. Socolescu. The building's interior is decorated by the then-famous church painter: Toma Vintilescu. The work was not completed until 1902. Severely affected by war and earthquakes, the church was restored and re-consecrated in 1945.

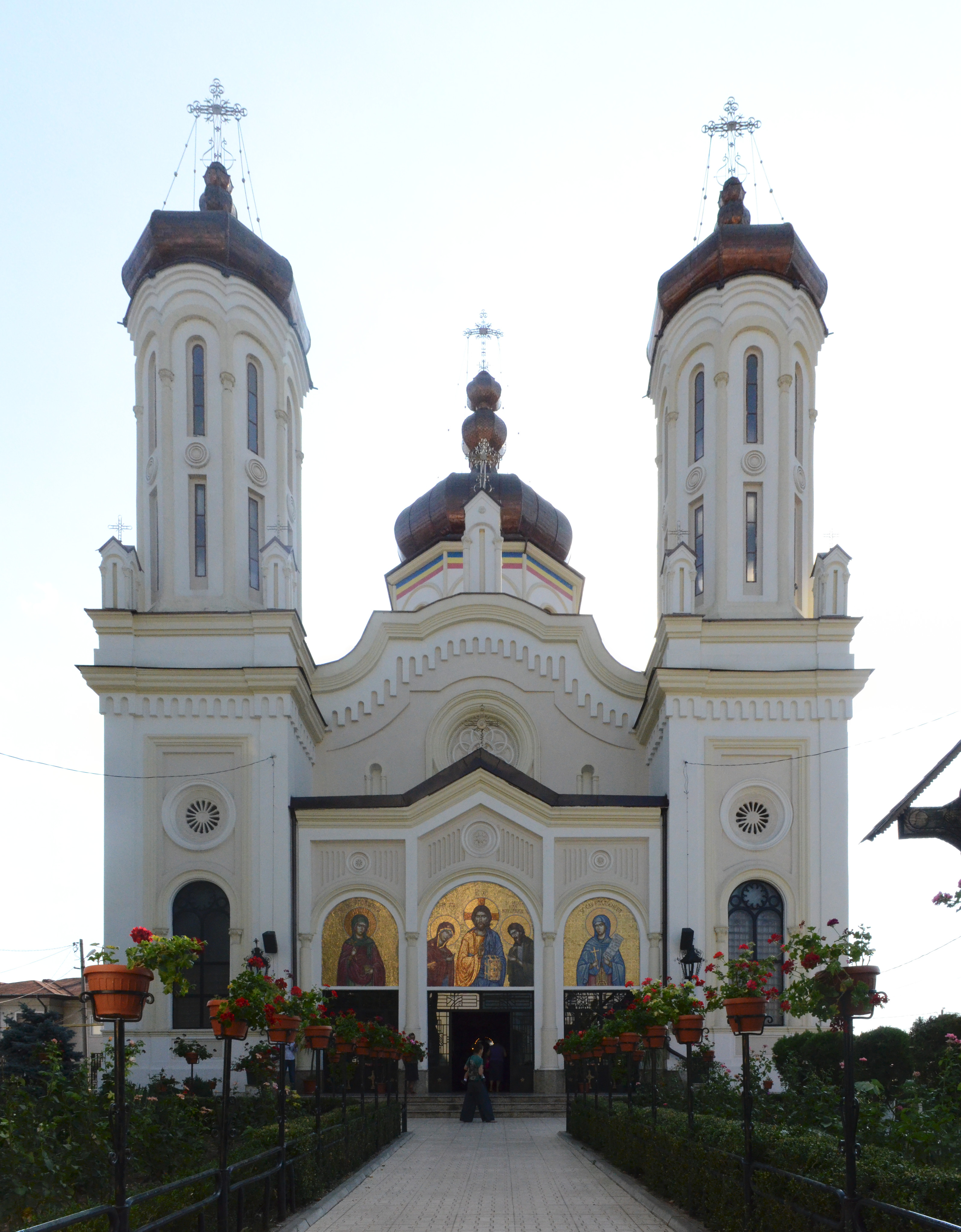
Sfânta Vineri Church.

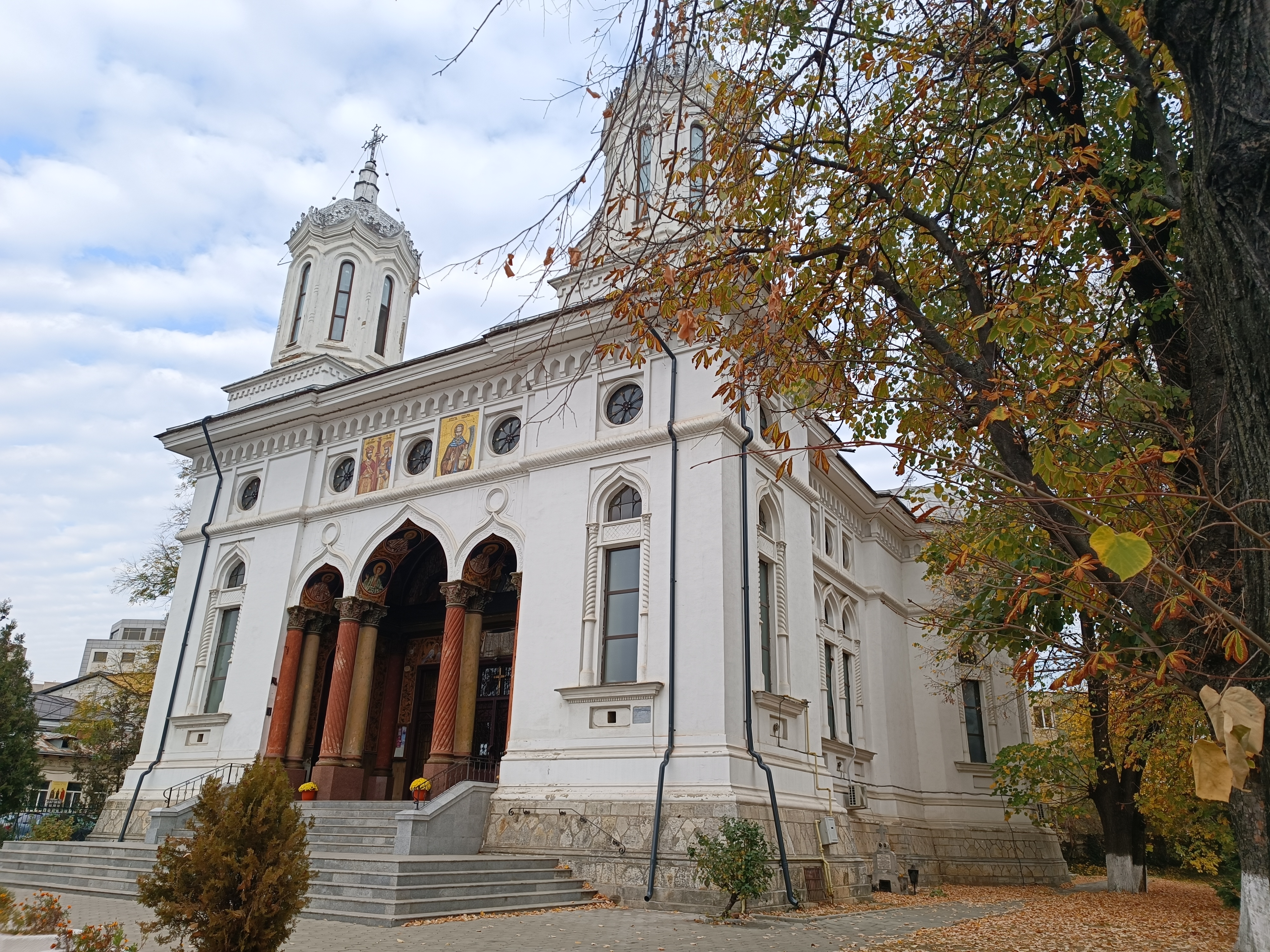
Church of the Holy Emperors Constantine and Elena.

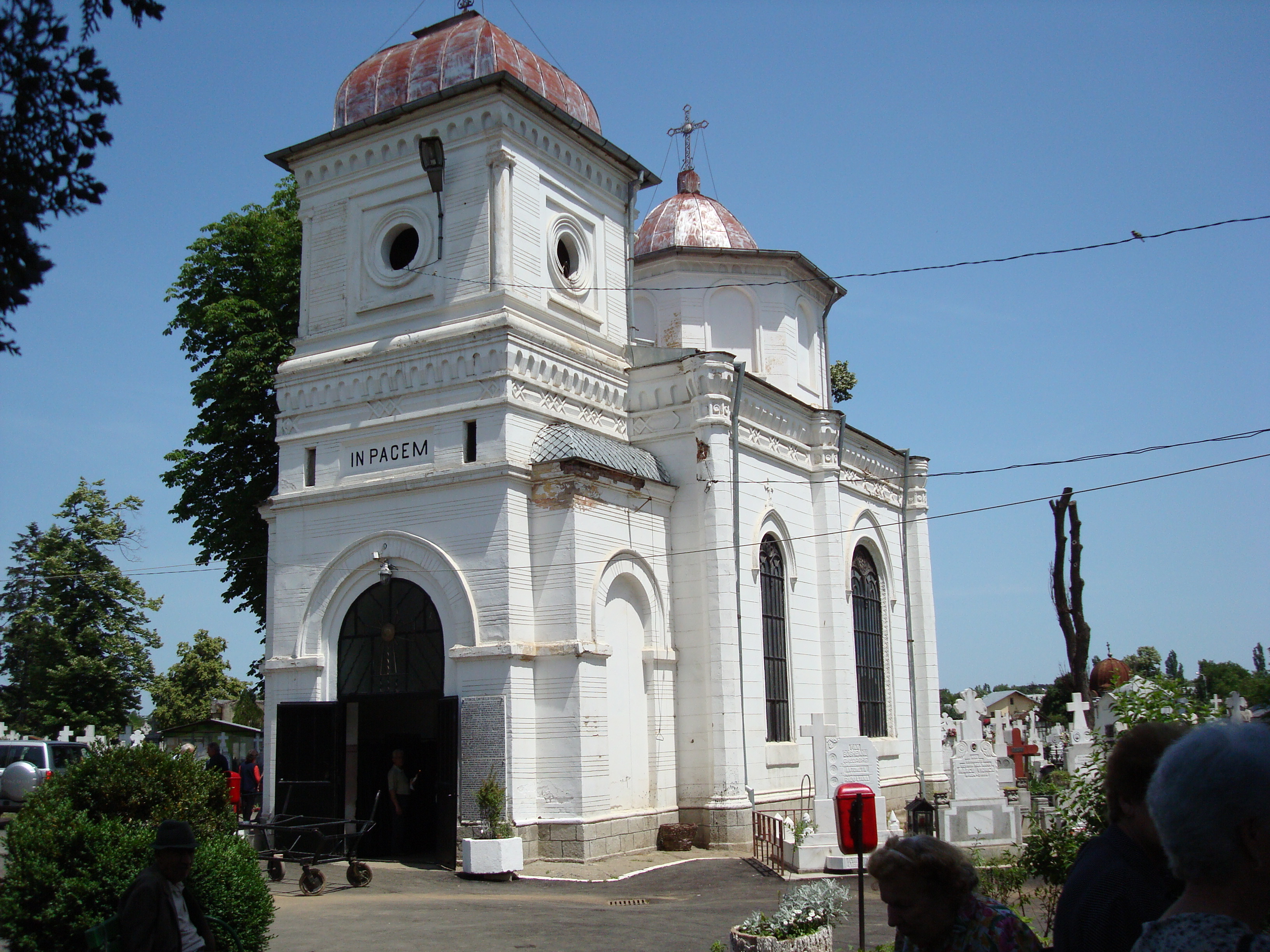
Viișoara cemetery chapel.

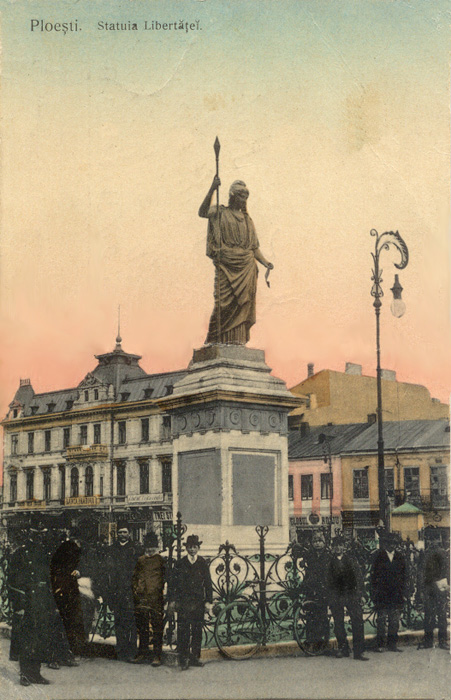
Ploiești' Statue of Liberty in 1908.

Churches and works of art.

- Plans and construction of the old Tribunal, built-in 1873, located on the sidewalk of today's Hotel Prahova Plaza, on strada Mihail Kogălniceanu, just opposite the Ergas Mamaciu house. It was severely damaged by the 1940 earthquake and demolished in the following months. (Note: Pages on the former courthouse of Ploiești: Lucian Vasile (2016-06-17). "Top 10 clădiri dispărute ale orașului Ploiești" [Top 10 missing buildings of Ploiești]. republicaploiesti.net (Republica Ploiesti - Povești despre vechiul Ploiești) (in Romanian).; Lucian Vasile (2010-02-19). "Tribunalul Vechi" [The old Court]. republicaploiesti.net (Republica Ploiesti - Povești despre vechiul Ploiești) (in Romanian).)

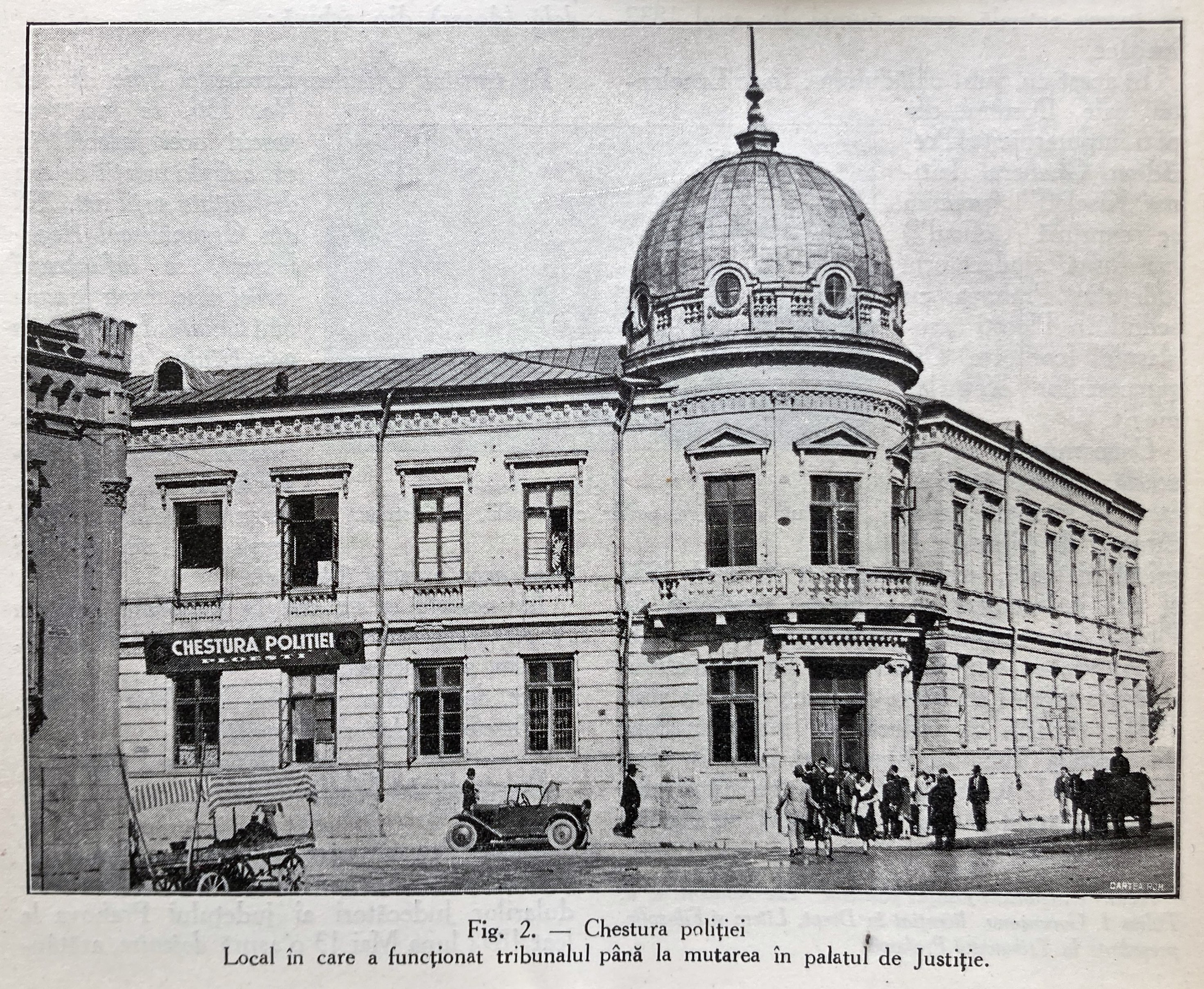
The old Ploiești courthouse designed and built by Toma N. Socolescu, in 1879.

- He drew up the plans and built the Palace of Public Baths on the commission of Radu Stanian, between 1877 and 1878, between 1877 and 1979. (Note: pp. 195-196.) The baths, later renamed Municipal Baths, were then sold to the city. Inaugurated in 1881, they were a symbol admired by residents. They remained in operation until after the Second World War, housing the baths, but also, by period, part of the classes of the Sfântul Petru şi Pavel high school, a typographic workshop and other institutions, such as the Nicolae Iorga Library from 1921 until 1941. The palace was destroyed by the communists in 1955 (Note: page 30.) and replaced by dull, styleless housing blocks.
- Plans and construction of the School of Arts and Crafts, on strada Văleni (at the time), built in 1886. (Note: p. 174.) Classified as a historic monument, It is located at 22 strada Văleni and housed a public administration until 2023: the Urban Management Services of the city of Ploiești (SGU), which left the building to allow for its consolidation. These works are part of a program funded under the PNRR (National Recovery and Resilience Plan) since October 2022. However, Romania has so far been unable to access the many European funds made available to it (including the PNRR), not only due to the incompetence of the Romanian administration and successive governments, but also because of the failure to implement all the reforms required for their disbursement. As of August 31, 2025, part of the funds may be permanently lost by Romania. As of June 2025, no work has yet started on this building.
- Plans and construction of Boys' elementary school "Number 3", in 1888, one of the city's oldest elementary schools, then located at the corner of Târgușor (or Târgșor) streets, and lieutenant Al. Zagoriţ street, known formerly as Ghiţă Alexiu street. (Note: p. 196.) It now houses a kindergarten at 58 Mărășești street, at the intersection with Lobacevschiu street.
- The fish market, in 1880, under the mandate of Mayor Constantin T. Grigorescu. It was demolished to make way for the construction of the Central Halls of Ploiești, the major work of his son Toma T Socolescu.
- The fire station, behind the old town hall, in 1881. It was destroyed following the 1940 earthquake.
- The Grand Hotel Luca Moise, as well as the adjacent theater hall, completed on October 15, 1885. The hotel was located at the intersection of Mihail Kogălniceanu Street, formerly Franceză, and Constantin Dobrogeanu Gherea Street, formerly Municipalității. They will be demolished following the 1977 earthquake, as part of the communist Systematization program established for the city in 1968.
- Bulevard hotel, in 1896, which was his last work. It was located on Union Square (Piața Unirii), with stores on the first floor and rooms upstairs. After the First World War, it was leased by Prahova's financial administration. Prahova. It has since been demolished.

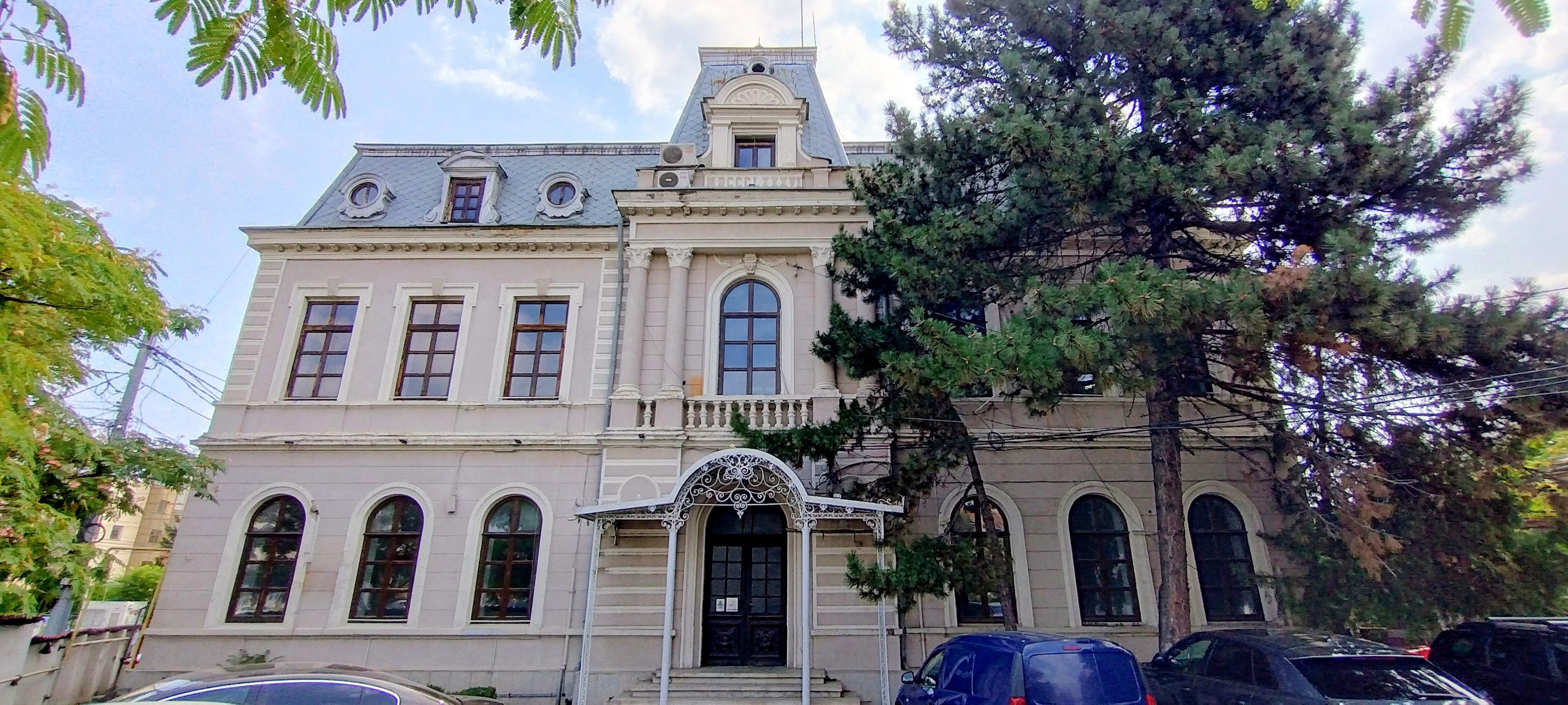
The Ploiești School of Arts and Crafts, in 2025.

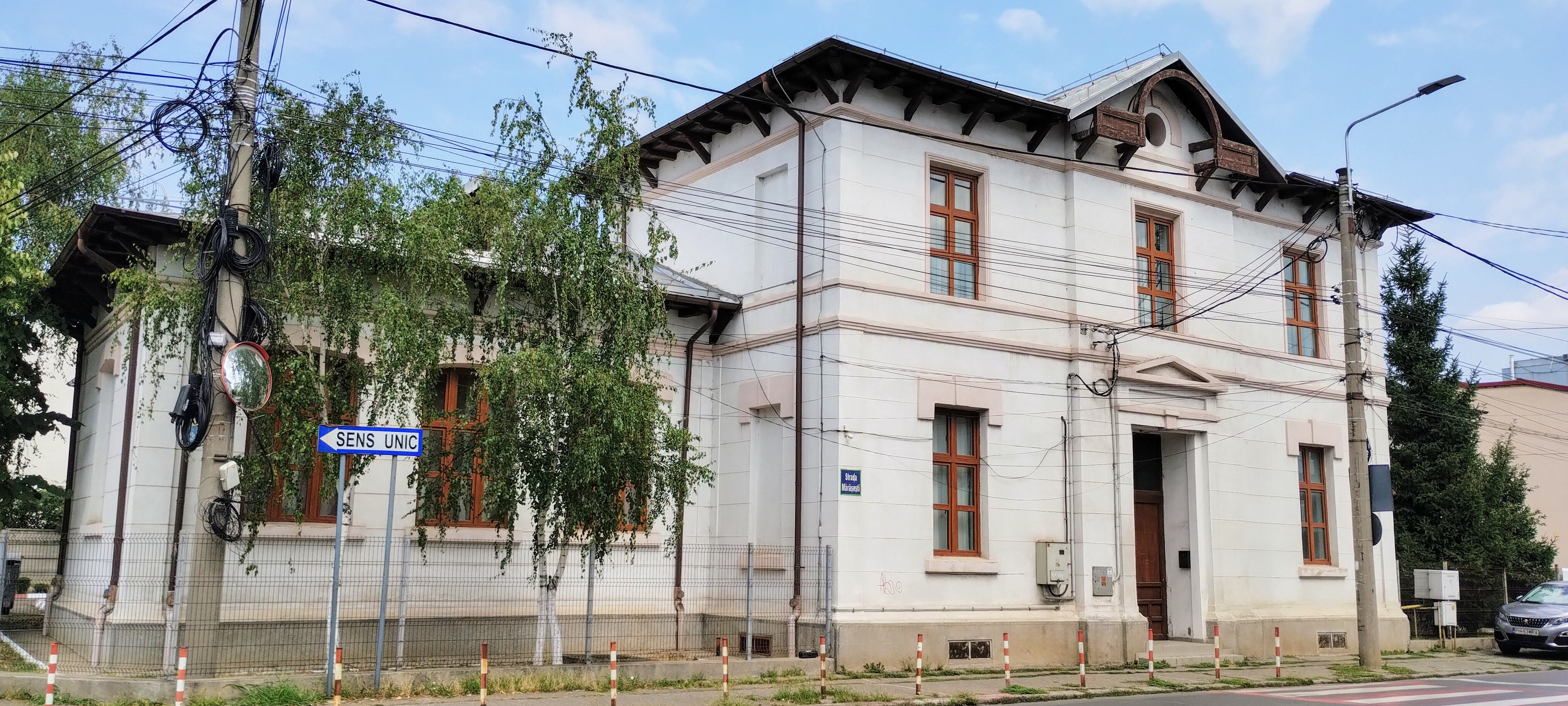
Boys' Primary School "Number 3", in 2025.

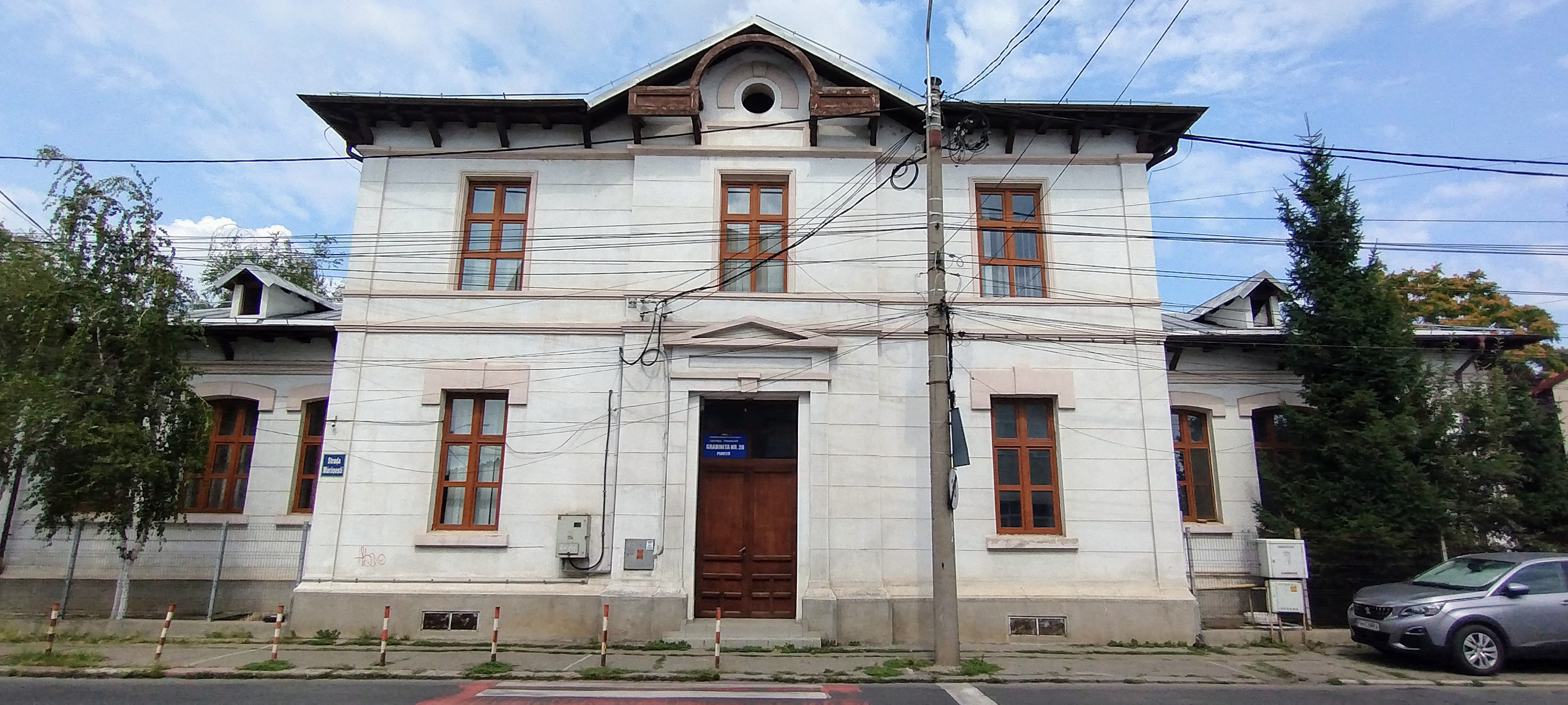
Boys' Primary School "Number 3", in 2025.

Schools in Ploiești.

- He designed and built the marble base (quarried in Prahova) of the Statue of Liberty, as well as its wrought-iron fence. Inaugurated on June 11, 1881, the bronze statue represents Minerva, Goddess of Wisdom. It is made and cast in France. It has been moved several times over the years, it is now located on the Place des Héros, in front of the Saint John the Baptist Cathedral (Catedrală Sfântul Ioan Ioan Botezătorul), built by his son Toma T. Socolescu. It became an important symbol of the city following the political turbulence of 1870. It was long neglected and hidden away by the Communists. Badly deteriorated in the 2000s, it was finally restored from 2008 to 2012, then moved again in 2012 to its current location. The statue is classified as a historical monument.

==== Houses and shops ====
- The new Dimitrie Sfetescu's house. (Note: p. 179.) Classified as a historic monument, it became the headquarters of the oil company Concordia in the 1930s, then the headquarters of the Ploiești municipal police in the 2000s. It can still be seen at no. 21, boulevardul Independenței. (Note: A walk along Independence Boulevard which evokes Dimitrie Sfetescu, Gheorghe Dobrescu, D. Angelescu and Toma Rucăreanu old houses: Lucian Vasile (2010-12-27). "O plimbare pe Bulevard (II)" [Une promenade sur le boulevard]. republicaploiesti.net (Republica Ploiesti - Povești despre vechiul Ploiești) (in Romanian).)

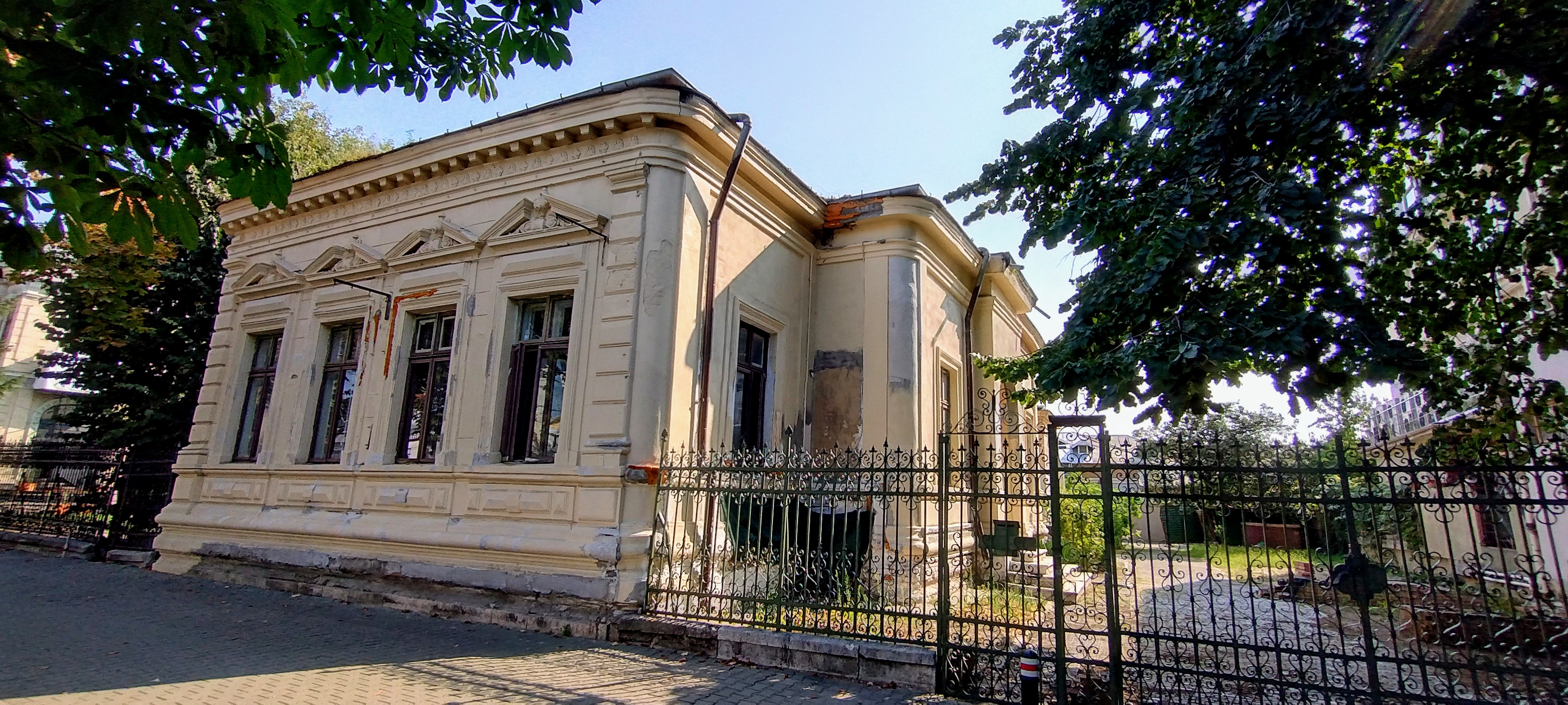
The Gheorghe Dobrescu house, at 23 boulevard Independenței, in 2025.

- Gheorghe Dobrescu's house, the residence of a prominent merchant from Brașov (Transylvania), located at 23 boulevardul Independenței and still visible today.
- Dimitrie Angelescu House. Demolished in the early 2000s. A new house has since been rebuilt, replicating its original style.
- Gogălniceanu Property at the intersection of I. Radovici street and Kogălniceanu street, in 1870, a large merchant house with shops on the ground floor and residential space on the upper floor. The corner of the building features a frontispiece decorated with a bas-relief depicting two lions and a bust of Michael the Brave, the Wallachian prince credited with the strong development of the city, whose memory is often commemorated on old buildings or writings related to Ploiești. It was demolished following the 1977 earthquake.
- He designed the plans and built many of the one-story shops on Lipscani street, a historic and emblematic thoroughfare and commercial hub of the city, as well as on other downtown streets such as Cavafi street, in the Neoclassical and Neo-Italian style. These buildings were preserved in their original form until the American bombing raids of 1944. Communist urban redevelopment, initiated in the 1960s and later followed by Ceaușescu's systematization, sealed their fate. They all disappeared—along with Lipscani street itself. Strada Lipscani was a gently curved old street that stretched from the heart of the city to the Palace of Justice. This thoroughfare, once home to most of the city's shops, vanished in two stages: the first half, near the Palace of Culture, was demolished between 1968 and 1969 to make way for the current administrative complex. The other half was demolished after the 1977 earthquake.

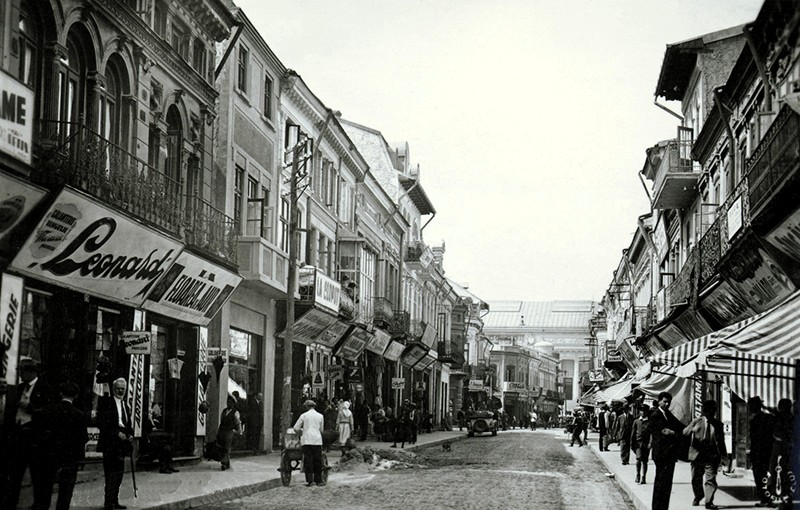
Lipscani street, Ploiești, in the 1930s.

- Toma Rucăreanu's house, in 1884. Listed as a historical monument, it become Sfetescu house, located at 19, Independenței boulevard. It hosted the restaurant Mon jardin until June 2024, when it permanently closed.
- Also around 1888, he built the large Eliade or Eliad building, on the square in front of the Luca Moise Grand Hotel. The building no longer exists.
- I. Bazar house, located on the former Bucureşti avenue, at the corner of the Ştefan cel Mare street, since gone.
- Naumescu house on the Rudului street, destroyed.

The list is not exhaustive. (Note: Toma T. Socolescu writes: "[...] And many other particular houses.", p. 56.) (Note: Toma T. Socolescu writes: "[...] And many other particular houses.", p. 196.)

==== Achievements as Master builder & contractor ====
- The Despina Doamna girl high school, on Buna Vestire street, in 1890, according to his brother Ion N. Socolescu's project. (Note: pp. 70 and 82.) (Note: p. 199.) Transformed into a military hospital during World War II from 1941 to 1943, the school was finally destroyed by the American bombardments of April 1944. (Note: History of the Despina Doamna school: Lucian Vasile (2011-02-21). "Scoala Despina Doamna si Casa Pionierilor" [Despina Doamna School and the Pioneers' House]. republicaploiesti.net (Republica Ploiesti - Povești despre vechiul Ploiești) (in Romanian).)
- Reconstruction of the Boldescu Hospital in 1893, located on Boldescustreet. The hospital was originally founded in 1831 by the boyar intendant of the same name, Gheorghe Bolcescu. The reconstruction was carried out based on plans by architect Filip Xenopol. (Note: pp. 185-186.)
- The Number Two schools for boys and girls

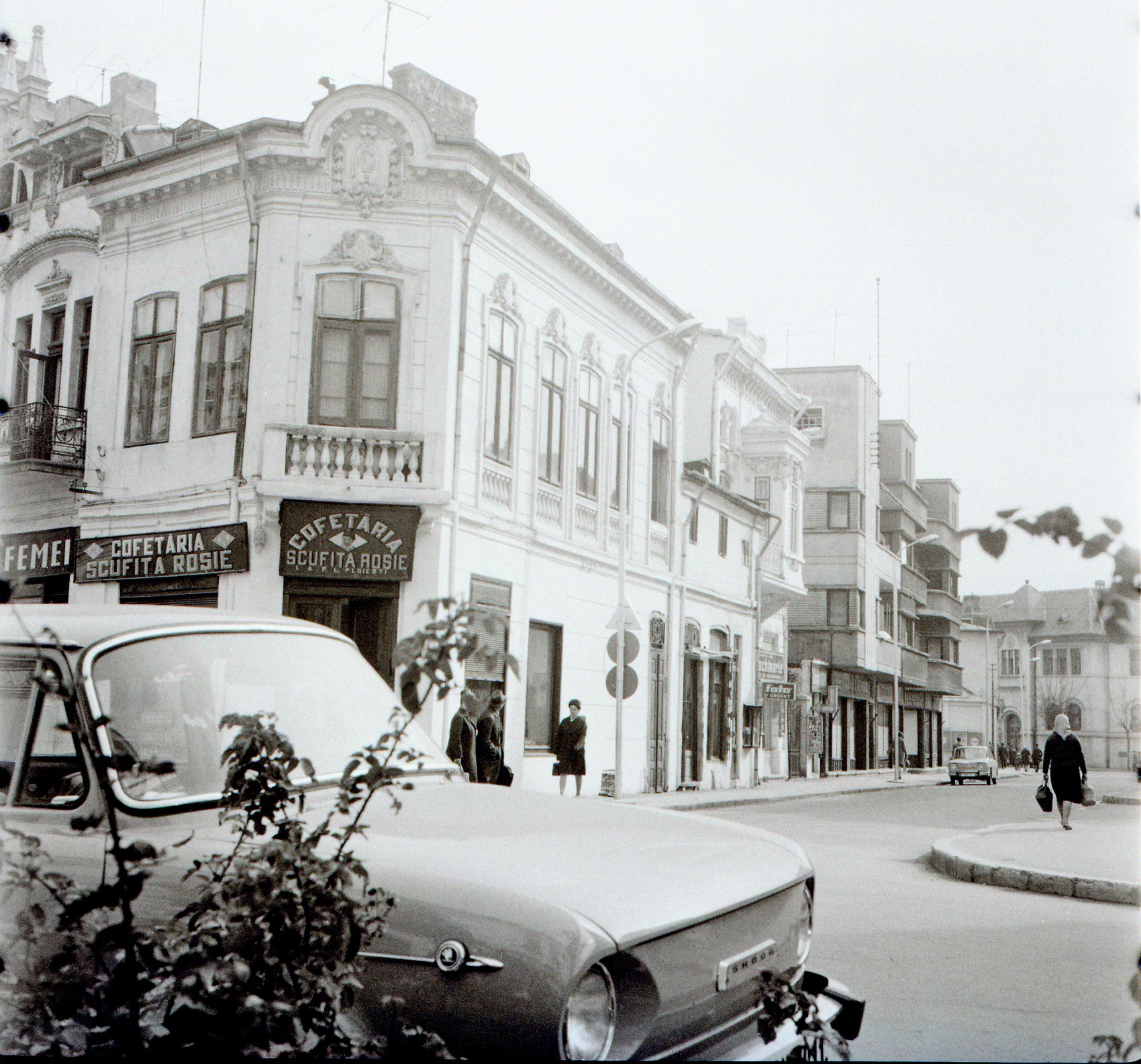
Gogălniceanustore, 1970.

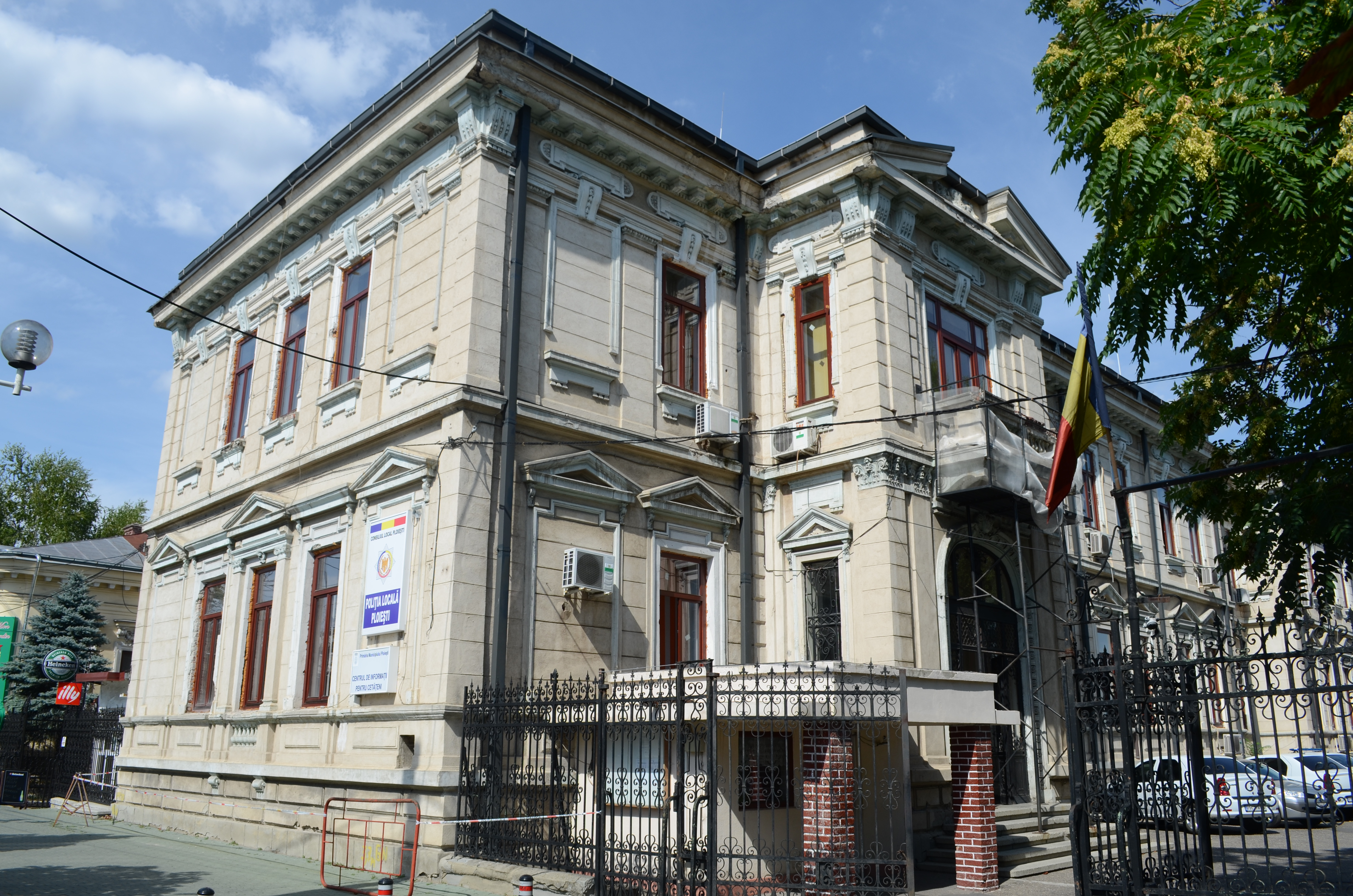
Dimitrie Sfetescu house, 2012.

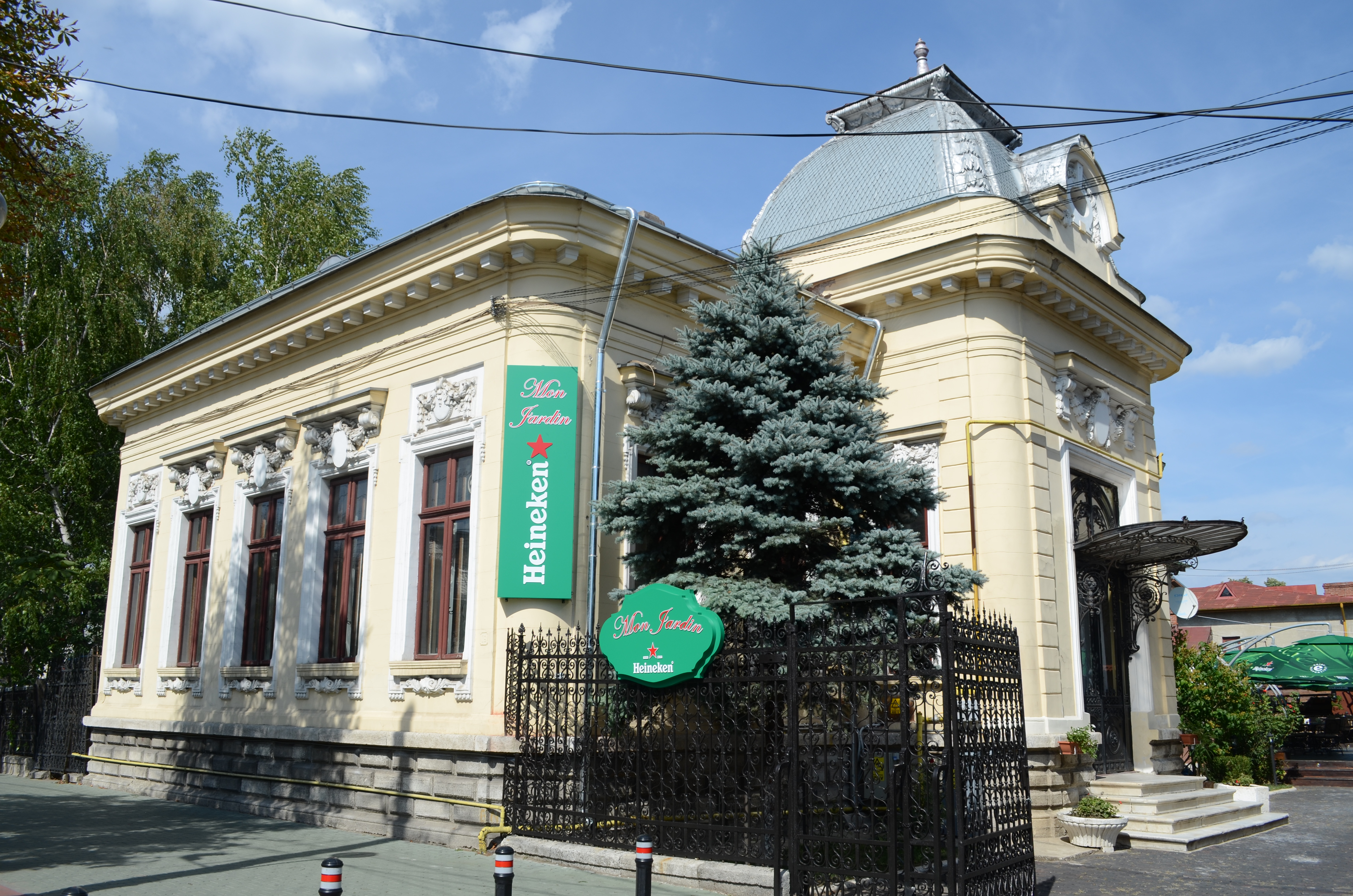
Toma Rucăreanu house, 2012.

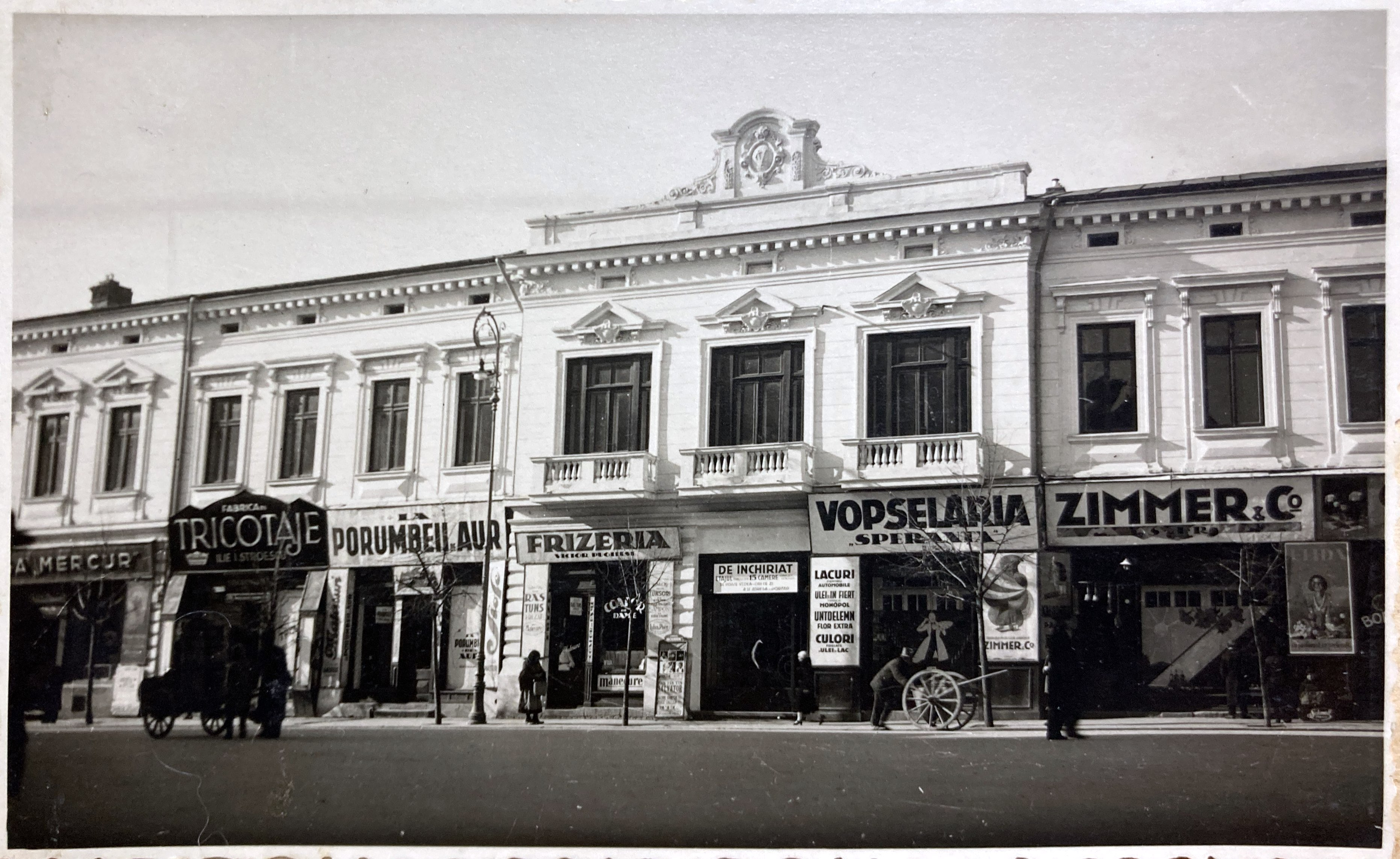
The former Bulevard hotel circa 1930.

Stores, houses and hotels in Ploiești.

=== In Prahova county ===
- Sfinții voievozi Church, started in 1876, completed and consecrated in 1884, it is located in the center of the town of Urlați. The painter Gheorghe Tattarescu decorated it with numerous remarkable icons.
- Restoration of the old Câmpina town hall, circa 1880, building originally constructed by his father Niculae Gheorghe Socol around 1850 for the journalist Zaharia Carcalechi, it was taken over by the local administration in 1877 and converted into a town hall. It was located at the intersection of Doftanei avenue, and the city's central boulevard, Carol I boulevard. It was demolished in 1922, and another city hall was built on the same site.

==== Achievements as Master builder & contractor ====
- Vasile Paapa trade school (Note: pp. 133-134 and 196.) of Valea Boului, since renamed Valea Cricovului. Vasile Paapa (1819-1884), acting minister in 1861, was a great philanthropist and made numerous donations to Ploiesti schools. He entirely funded the "trade School" as well as the Valea Călugărească elementary school. (Note: p. 133.)
- Vasile Paapa primary school of Valea Călugărească village
- Urlaţi and Sinaia hospitals
- The Mizil military barracks.

=== In Bucarest ===
==== Achievements as Master builder & contractor ====
- Cuza-Vodă barracks, located on Dealul Spirii, in the middle of the historic Uranus district, completely razed by Ceausescu, to build the gigantic and much-contested “People's Palace”.

=== In other counties ===
==== Achievements as Master builder & contractor ====
- Iordache Zossimade agriculture school of Armășești, judeţ of Ialomița, built around 1887.

== Legacy ==
"Until 1944, a large part of the most beautiful streets of Ploiești, as well as the city's emblematic monuments for which he was responsible, profoundly shaped the face of the city, to which Toma N. Socolescu had brought a French- and Italian-inspired neoclassical touch. The Neo-Romanian style was added to this ensemble, largely represented by the work of his son Toma T. Socolescu, a major builder in Ploiești and throughout the county. Buildings in the Art deco and even Bauhaus styles also appeared. The American bombings of 1944 destroyed one-eighth of the buildings and permanently disrupted the city's harmony and architectural eclecticism. (Note: Web pages about the bombings of Ploiești: Lucian Vasile (2012-12-08). "Panorama aeriana a Ploiestilor dupa bombardament" [Aerial panorama of Ploiești after the bombing]. republicaploiesti.net (Republica Ploiesti - Povești despre vechiul Ploiești) (in Romanian).; Video of American bombing raids in April 1944: Lucian Vasile (2018-04-05). "Bombardamentul din 5 aprilie 1944 asupra Ploieștiului" [The April 5, 1944 bombing of Ploiești]. republicaploiesti.net (Republica Ploiesti - Povești despre vechiul Ploiești) (in Romanian).) The 1940 earthquake and 1977 also dealt heavy blows to the buildings in Prahova, including several by Toma N. Socolescu. However, the most significant destruction was carried out by the communists, who completed the disfigurement of the city between 1960 and 1989 through two waves of systematization. The largest campaign was ordered by Nicolae Ceaușescu, the last communist dictator. These sweeping demolition operations often used the alleged weakening of buildings by the 1977 earthquake as a pretext to eliminate them—along with the face of an era that evoked all too clearly a triumphant, educated bourgeoisie and the defiant expression of a period the new regime was determined to erase. Several churches and public buildings by the architect still remain, along with a few beautiful residences. They remain landmarks of the city, most of them listed as historic monuments. The works of Toma N. Socolescu continue to represent the expression of neoclassicism in architecture.

Well known in the city of Ploiești, the architect's name is closely linked to the history of a city once thriving through trade and the oil industry, and whose future then seemed full of promise. A high school bears his name as well as a street: strada Arhitect Toma Socolescu.

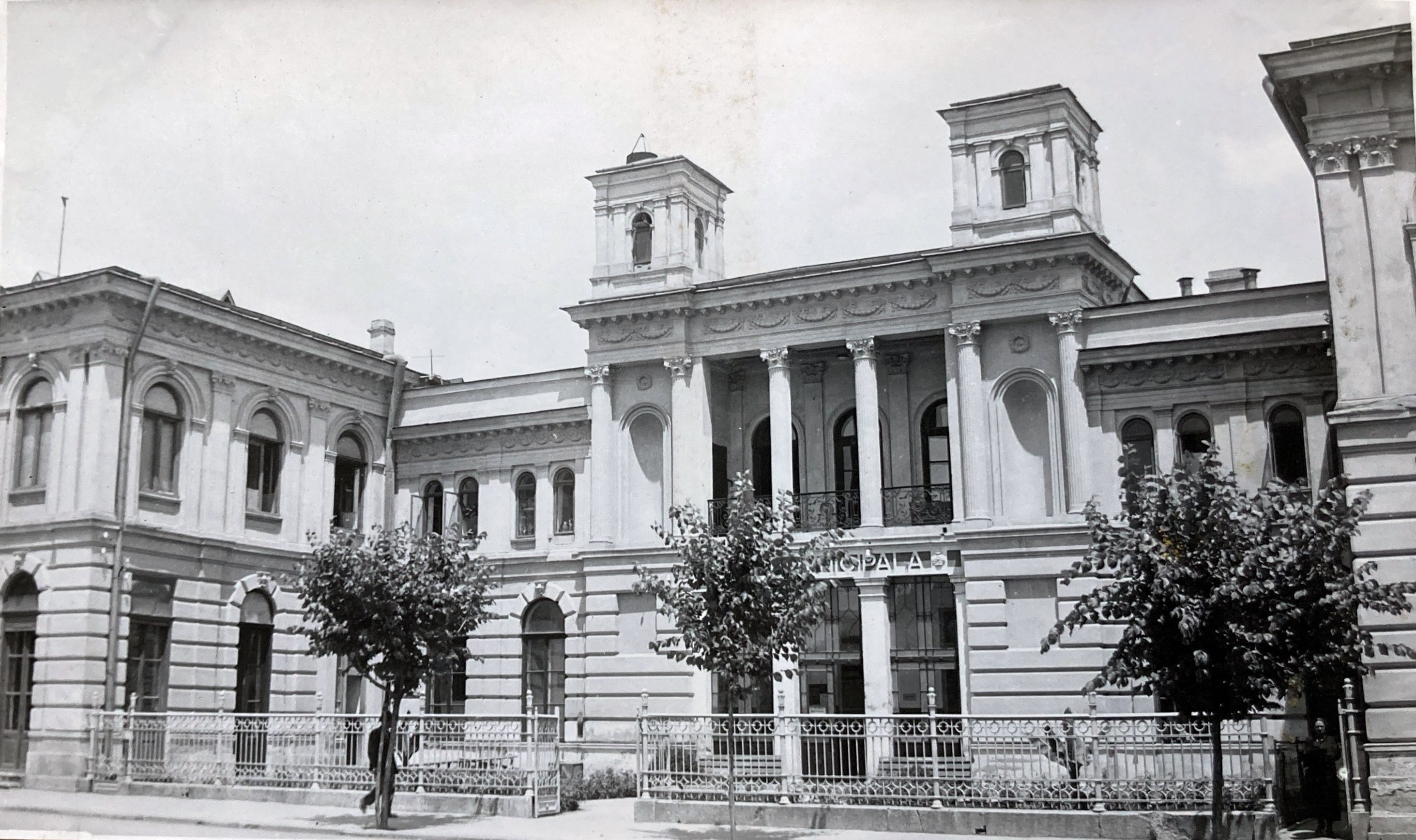
The Palace of the communal baths.

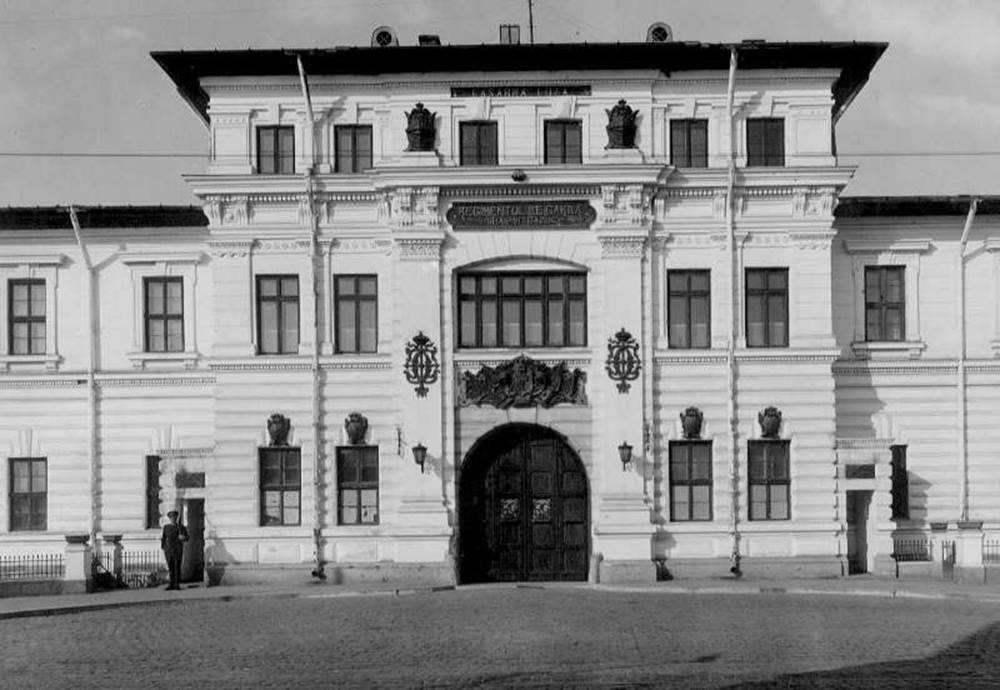
The Cuza-Vodă barracks, circa 1930.

Baths of Ploiești and the Cuza-Vodă barracks.

== Bibliography ==
- George D. Florescu (1941–1942). "Un sfetnic al lui Matei Basarab, ginerele lui Mihai Viteazul" [A counsellor of Matei Basarab, the son-in-law of Michael the Brave] (PDF). Revista Istorică Română (in Romanian) (XI–XII). Bucharest: Imprimeria Națională: 66–94..
- Toma T. Socolescu (2004). Amintiri [Memories] (in Romanian). Bucharest: Caligraf Design. ISBN 973-86771-0-6. ·
- Toma T. Socolescu (2004). Fresca arhitecților care au lucrat în România în epoca modernă 1800 - 1925 [Fresco of architects who worked in Romania in the modern era 1800 - 1925] (in Romanian). Bucharest: Editura Caligraf Design. ISBN 973-86771-1-4.
- Toma T. Socolescu (1938). "Preface by Nicolae Iorga". Arhitectura în Ploești, studiu istoric [Architecture in Ploești, historical study] (in Romanian). Vol. reference: 16725. Bucharest: Cartea Românească. The book contains many of the chapters written (by the architect) for Ploești's monograph by Mihail Sevastos.
- Mihail Sevastos (1937). Monografia orașului Ploești [Monograph of the City of Ploiești] (in Romanian). Bucharest: Cartea Românească.. Toma T. Socolescu is one of the authors of the monograph. He wrote the chapters on architecture, the central market halls, urban planning, the history of the city's maps, as well as popular culture (visual artists, museums, and the 'Nicolae Iorga' library). The book also includes many of his drawings and watercolors.
- (in Romanian) Gabriela Petrescu (2024). ARHITECȚII SOCOLESCU 1840-1940, Studiu monografic [The Socolescu Architects 1840–1940, A Monographic Study] (in Romanian). Bucharest: Editura Simetria. ISBN 978-973-1872-55-1.
- (in Romanian) Lucian Vasile (2016) [2014]. Orașul sacrificat. Al Doilea Război Mondial la Ploiești [The Sacrificed City: The Second World War in Ploiești] (in Romanian) (2nd ed.). Ploiești: Asociatia pentru Educatie si Dezvoltare Urbana. ISBN 978-973-0-21379-9.
- (in Romanian) Journal Analele Architecturei și ale Artelor cu care se légă, Publishing director: Ion N. Socolescu, Tipgografia Curtii Regale, F. Göbl & fils, Bucharest, published from 1890 to 1893.
- (in Romanian) Trestioreanu, Constantin; Marinică, Gheorghe (2003). Bisericile din Ploiești, I Bisericile ortodoxe [Eglises à Ploiești, I Eglises orthodoxes] (in Romanian). Ploiești: Editura Ploiești Milenium III. ISBN 973-85670-4-1.
- Lucia Hossu-Longin (2012). Memorialul Durerii, o istorie care nu se învață la școală (documentary). Memorialul durerii: Memorialul Bucureştilor - Curcubeul negru – demolarea cartierului Uranus (in Romanian). TVR Cultural. "The Memorial of Suffering - A TVR documentary on the destruction of Bucharest carried out by dictator Ceaușescu, focusing on the Uranus district - 43min".
- Lucia Hossu-Longin (2012). Memorialul Durerii, o istorie care nu se învață la școală (documentary). Memorialul durerii: Memorialul Bucureștilor - cartierele din zona Uranus-Puișor-Dealul Spirii (in Romanian). TVR Cultural. "The Memorial of Suffering - A TVR documentary on the destruction of Bucharest carried out by dictator Ceaușescu, focusing on the Uranus, Puișor, and Dealul Spirii districts - 45min".

== Other sources ==
- (in Romanian) Official documents from Romanian institutions, including the official Romanian newspaper (Monitorul Oficial).
- (France) and (Romania) Socolescu family archives (Paris, Bucarest) including a photographic collection.
- (in Romanian) Lucian Vasile, Historian, Senior Advisor at the National Council for the Study of the Securitate Archives (CNSAS) since 2025, former Expert and head of department at the Institute for the Investigation of Communist Crimes and the Memory of the Romanian Exile (IICCMER), president of the Association for Education and Urban Development (AEDU), author of the specialized site on the city of Ploiești and its history : RepublicaPloiesti.net.

== Notes and references ==
- (a) Toma T. Socolescu (1938). "Preface by Nicolae Iorga". Arhitectura în Ploești, studiu istoric [Architecture in Ploești, historical study] (in Romanian). Vol. reference: 16725. Bucharest: Cartea Românească..
- (b) Toma T. Socolescu (2004). Amintiri [Memories] (in Romanian). Bucharest: Caligraf Design. ISBN 973-86771-0-6.
- (c) Toma T. Socolescu (2004). Fresca arhitecților care au lucrat în România în epoca modernă 1800 - 1925 [Fresco of architects who worked in Romania in the modern era 1800 - 1925] (in Romanian). Bucharest: Editura Caligraf Design. ISBN 973-86771-1-4.
- (d) Mihail Sevastos (1937). Monografia orașului Ploești [Monograph of the City of Ploiești] (in Romanian). Bucharest: Cartea Românească.
- (e) Gabriela Petrescu (2024). ARHITECȚII SOCOLESCU 1840-1940, Studiu monografic [The Socolescu Architects 1840–1940, A Monographic Study] (in Romanian). Bucharest: Editura Simetria. ISBN 978-973-1872-55-1.
- (f) RepublicaPloiesti.net, Lucian Vasile, historian, senior advisor at the National Council for the Study of the Securitate Archives (CNSAS) since 2025, former expert and head of department at the Institute for the Investigation of Communist Crimes and the Memory of the Romanian Exile (IICCMER), president of the Association for Education and Urban Development (AEDU), creator (August 2009) and author of the website dedicated to the city's history and architecture
- Other notes and references:
