= Vasile Duță =

Romanian politician (1955–2016)

Member of the Senate of Romania
- In office 2000–2004

Personal details
- Born: July 2, 1955 Răzvad, Dâmbovița County, Romania
- Died: May 20, 2016 (aged 60)
- Party: Greater Romania Party (2000 - 2001); Independent (2001 - 2002); Social Democratic Party (2002 - 2004); Independent (2004 - 2010)
- Education: University of Bucharest
- Occupation: Politician
- Profession: Lawyer

Vasile Duță (July 2, 1955 – May 20, 2016) was a Romanian politician. He was a member of the Senate (2000–2004) for Bihor County. Initially affiliated with the Greater Romania Party, he served as an independent from May 2001 through December 2002, and then through October 2004 with the Social Democrats, after which he reverted to an independent.

He was born in Răzvad, Dâmbovița County, and graduated from the Faculty of Law at the University of Bucharest. Married with four children, he practiced law in Târgoviște before going into politics.

In 2010, Duță was convicted of influence peddling and received a five-year sentence. He died of lung cancer, at age 60.

== See also ==
- List of corruption scandals in Romania
