= Răzvad =

- Commune
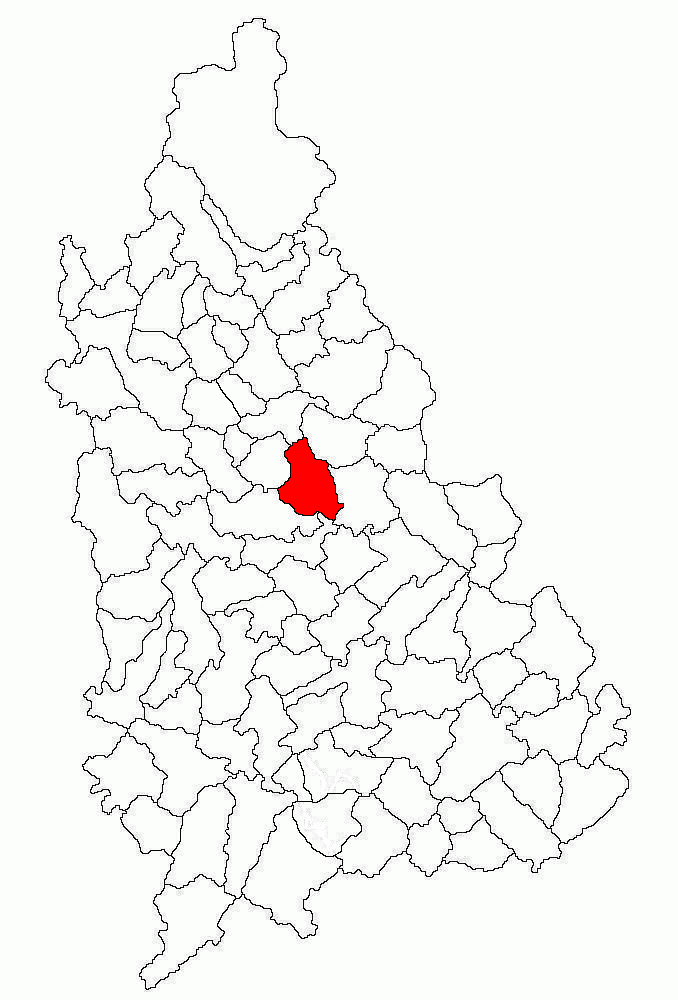
- Location in Dâmbovița County

- Location in Romania
- Coordinates: 44°56′N 25°32′E
- Country: Romania
- County: Dâmbovița

Government
  - Mayor (2020–2024): Emanuel Spătaru (PSD)
- Area: 41.86 km^{2} (16.16 sq mi)
- Elevation: 263 m (863 ft)
- Population (2021-12-01): 8,729
  - Density: 210/km^{2} (540/sq mi)
- Time zone: EET/EEST (UTC+2/+3)
- Postal code: 137395
- Area code: +(40) 245
- Vehicle reg.: DB
- Website: comunarazvad.ro

Răzvad is a commune in Dâmbovița County, Muntenia, Romania with a population of 8,729 people as of 2021. It is composed of three villages: Gorgota, Răzvad, and Valea Voievozilor.

The commune is located in the central part of Dâmbovița County, east of the county seat, Târgoviște, on the left bank of the Ialomița River. It is crossed by the national road DN72, which connects Ploiești to Târgoviște and ends in Găești.

Historical population
Year	Pop.	±%
2002	8,409	—
2011	8,521	+1.3%
2021	8,729	+2.4%
Source: Census data

== Natives ==
- Radu Câmpeanu (1922–2016), politician
- Vasile Duță (1955–2016), politician
- Ileana Sărăroiu (1936–1979), singer of traditional and popular folk music
