= Gheorghe Becescu-Silvan =

Romanian politician and writer (1875–1824)

Gheorghe S. Becescu-Silvan
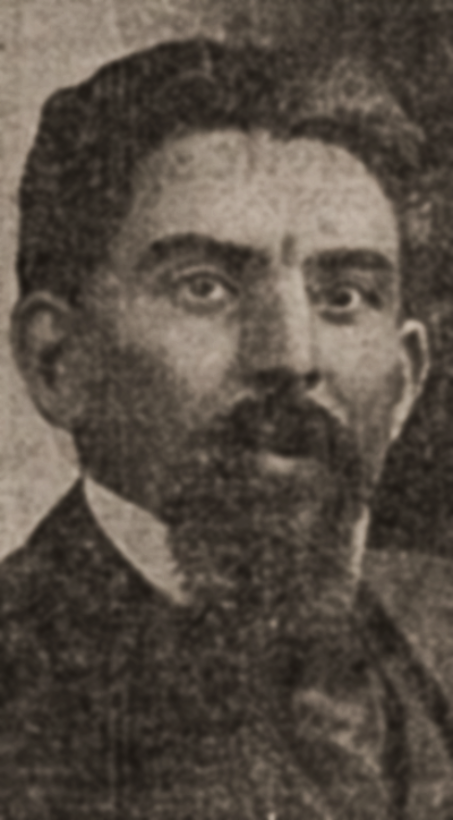
- Becescu-Silvan in 1913

Member of the Assembly of Deputies of Romania
- In office February – May 1914
- In office May 1914 – May 1918
- In office May 1920 – March 1922
- Constituency: Prahova County

Member of the Senate of Romania
- In office February – May 1920
- Constituency: Prahova County

Personal details
- Born: May 1875 Berești, Covurlui County; Principality of Romania
- Died: 29 March 1924 (aged 48) Ploiești, Kingdom of Romania
- Party: PCD (1910); PNL (1910–1912, 1913–1919); PND (1912); National Peasants' and Workers' Party (1919); PP (1920–1924)
- Spouse: Erotheea Becescu
- Profession: Writer, lawyer, tour guide, photographer, telegraphist

Gheorghe S. Becescu-Silvan, or Sylvan (May 1875 – 29 March 1924), was a Romanian writer, lawyer and political figure, also noted as a hiker and mountaineer. His complex, sometimes conflictual, relationship with the Romanian Orthodox Church began in adolescence, when he gave up on his seminary education and joined groups of socialist intellectuals. He was well-liked in his youth for his poetic contributions, with some seeing him as a great promise—especially through his work for Adevărul; however, he also came to be regarded by various peers as indolent, wasteful, and ultimately underachieving. In the 1890s, Becescu established and led magazines that created links between the socialists and the Literatorul circle. He himself came to question the latter, especially after its embrace of Symbolism, preferring instead a form of neo-romanticism, tinged with Romanian nationalism, that inspired his historical novels. He saw himself as an ally of the Sămănătorul group, but had to deal with harsh criticism from its leader, Nicolae Iorga, who regarded Silvan's historical research as subpar. He eventually experienced independent success with his novels, as well as with his work in promoting tourism along the Southern Carpathians; though born in Western Moldavia, he became primarily associated with Prahova County, living most of his life in Ploiești.

Beginning in the 1910s, Becescu-Silvan was primarily a lawyer and a politician—though he promised new novels, including one about Jesus. After a definitive break with Iorga, he stood with the National Liberal Party, into which he channeled his mixture of nationalism and progressivism. He irritated the Conservative Party and other right-wing factions by continuously pushing for electoral and land reforms, as well as with his eyewitness critique of Romanian actions during the Second Balkan War. By the time of World War I, he was serving in the Deputies' Assembly, which had turned itself into a constituent assembly. At this stage, he embraced the Entente's cause, expressing hopes that the still-neutral country would declare against Austria-Hungary and the other Central Powers; thus eventually happened in August 1916.

Following massive defeats in 1916–1917, Silvan followed the rump Parliament to Iași. Here, he moderated his radicalism, emerging as a critic of left-wing dissenters, who had been emboldened by the February Revolution in allied Russia. Self-exiled in republican Ukraine, he returned to capitulating Romania in 1918, living for most of the year in relative seclusion. Silvan and other Ententists were then empowered by the November Armistice and the unexpected creation of Greater Romania, allowing them a triumphal return. He still quarreled with his National Liberal colleagues during the 1919 election, unsuccessfully presenting his own list of "National Peasantists".

Silvan's political career was briefly revived in the early 1920s, when he joined People's League, which sent him to the Senate, and then again to the Assembly. He criticized the group's policies from within, though he remained close to its leader, Alexandru Averescu; the two of them registered a major defeat in the 1922 election, which was also Silvan's final political campaign. He ultimately died of an untreatable pyelonephritis. Though he publicly embraced Freethought, he had always enjoyed a friendly report with the Orthodox monastic communities, including at Cheia Monastery (where he was ultimately buried). His novel about the Romanian War of Independence was sampled in at least one textbook, but its author remained largely forgotten by readers, and sometimes posthumously panned by literary historians.

== Biography ==
=== Early life and debut years ===
Born in May 1875 in Berești (in what was then the Romanian Principality's Covurlui County); as recounted by his writer friend, Gala Galaction, he was the son of a country doctor based in Răchitoasa, who, later in life, left his family to become an Orthodox monk. Before that, he made his young son attend an Orthodox seminary. Around 1894, Gheorghe was rebelling against his father and the church, reading banned modern books, performing in impromptu drama recitals, and publishing lay poems in various magazines; with time, he came to be personally acquainted with literary celebrities such as Ion Luca Caragiale and Constantin Mille, and was read with interest by cultural journalist Tudor Arghezi, who declared him a simmering "volcano" in Romanian poetry. Some of his first poems appeared in Rândunica quarterly, put out in 1894–1895 by Silvestru Moldovan and other Romanians of Austria-Hungary.

Silvan ended up quitting school, opting for private tutoring (which allowed him to read more books than any if his peers), and finally enlisting at the Bucharest Drama Conservatory. He also briefly worked as a telegraphist for the Romanian Post. His colleagues there included two other aspiring writers, namely Florian I. Becescu and Alexandru Cazaban. Amused by the coincidence, Cazaban wrote the two Becescu into a sketch story, and, in his words, "almost took a beating from both of them." In the meantime, his reported father had been caught up in the Ghenadie Petrescu affair—whereby Petrescu, the Bishop of Argeș, had come to oppose the Sturdza government. As reported by the opposition newspaper Timpul, in June 1896 Becescu Sr. was informally detained, then tormented, by the authorities, who wished to have him confess against his friend the prelate.

Silvan had a bohemian existence in Bucharest, affiliated with the socialists at Lumea Nouă magazine, and also wrote for Mille's Adevărul—before emerging as an editor of Carmen, a bi-weekly review. Press historian Remus Zăstroiu sees his contributions of that period, which were mostly accounts about the lives of hard-labor convicts, as a segment of the Adevărul school of literary realism, and "vaguely naturalistic". According to a 1961 analysis by scholar Savin Bratu, the Carmen group was an assortment of socialists and associates of Alexandru Macedonski from the Literatorul circle, who were engaged in the "absurd" cause of Bishop Ghenadie. As one of the youngest members of this society, Mihail Sadoveanu recalled Silvan's "tireless and fascinating gift of gab", but also made note that others laughed him off as a "coffee-house genius".

At the time of his encounters with Sadoveanu, Becescu had shunned Macedonski's circle, seeing it as too ridiculous. Some of Macedonski's enemies, including Alexandru Antemireanu, watched with glee as he imitated the senior poet, in particular for offering his disciples gifts of counterfeit gemstones. The parodic spectacle irritated another eyewitness, the journalist Ion Costin, who regarded Macedonski as innately superior to his critics. As recalled by Sadoveanu, Costin also commented that "this Sylvan fella" was outing himself as a "viper in [Macedonski's] bosom". Becescu himself debuted with a collection of novellas, Cuiburĭ părăsite ("Deserted Nests"), published during the final days of 1897 by Biblioteca Internațională. Galaction suggests that he was especially valuable with prose poems taken up by Adevărul, "announcing him as a special talent." He still published occasional conventional poems (especially acrostics), which one of his female readers, who answered a 1903 survey, described as "endearing". Around then, Becescu had become aware that he could not make his living from literature alone, and, as Galaction notes, wrote more infrequently and without much investment. In pursuit of a professional career in law, he is known to have studied at Ludwig-Maximilians-Universität and the Free University of Brussels (ULB).

Although hailing from Western Moldavia, Becescu lived most of his life in the Muntenian center of Ploiești, and married a local. In 1904, his address was No. 9 Ștefan cel Mare Street, though he was later known to be living at No. 3 Ferari Street. A man of athletic built and exotic looks, known to his friends as Maurul ("The Moor"), he indulged his passion for the Southern Carpathians, and spent much of his free time hiking. Sadoveanu was present at a meeting where Silvan reported on his trip to the Buzău Mountains, where he had discovered glaciers. When he complained that he only had had to photograph his finds, but not for publishing a topical article, Costin smiled and winked—meaning to suggest that Silvan was too lazy. Silvan and his mountaineering wife Erotheea were passionate about the more remote spots, outside the resorts of Prahova Valley, and helped discover Cheia (in the Ciucaș range). By 1906, the two Becescus also had a holiday cottage in Bușteni, at No. 381 Carol Street.

=== Historical novelist ===
In July 1901, Silvan took a doctorate of law from the ULB. Upon his return from Brussels, he joined H. Coșoi in putting out Revista Modernă ("The Modern Review"). It endures in cultural memory for having hosted one of Sadoveanu's earliest novellas, Ion Ursu, and ideological essays by Constantin Sandu-Aldea—though, as scholar Constantin Ciopraga notes, both its editors were equally "obscure" figures. In anticipation of positions later illustrated by Nicolae Iorga's Sămănătorul magazine, the group campaigned for Romanian nationalism, or a "national moment" in arts and letters. As a champion of this trend, Sadoveanu had asked Coșoi to vouch that Silvan, who "has returned from abroad", was "still a Romanian, that is, whether his contributions are still in the Romanian language and the subjects are still Romanian. [...] if Gh[eorghe] Silvan were in any way different [from us], I would never forgive him, nor would I forgive you".

Another member of the circle was Sărmanul Klopștock, who recalled spending hours with Silvan at the editorial offices in Muzelor mahala, and at Gambrinus Beer Hall, described him as charismatic, generous (having overall a "Christ-like abnegation"), and grave, with an "ebony goatee" and "angular cheekbones". Overall, he appeared to Klopștock as an Eastern Christian mystic, more interested in personal and collective salvation than in any matters of literature. He gave his younger colleagues a set of aesthetic guidelines: dismissing Haralamb Lecca as a "poser", he upheld Mihai Eminescu as an absolute model (while still noting that devotional poems by Jacob of Choziba were on a level never attained by Eminescu). Revista Modernă folded after several issues, but was continued into 1903 and 1904 as Paginĭ Alese ("Selected Pages"). In this form, it drew contributions from across the literary landscape: continuing to be frequented by Sadoveanu, it also obtained texts by Macedonski, D. Nanu, and Ștefan Petică. Now aligning itself with Macedonskian Symbolism, it recommended the Literatorul faction as a model to follow. Silvan was no longer affiliated by March 1902, having assigned editorial control to Coșoi. Officially, this was because of his time being entirely consumed by "multiple occupations".

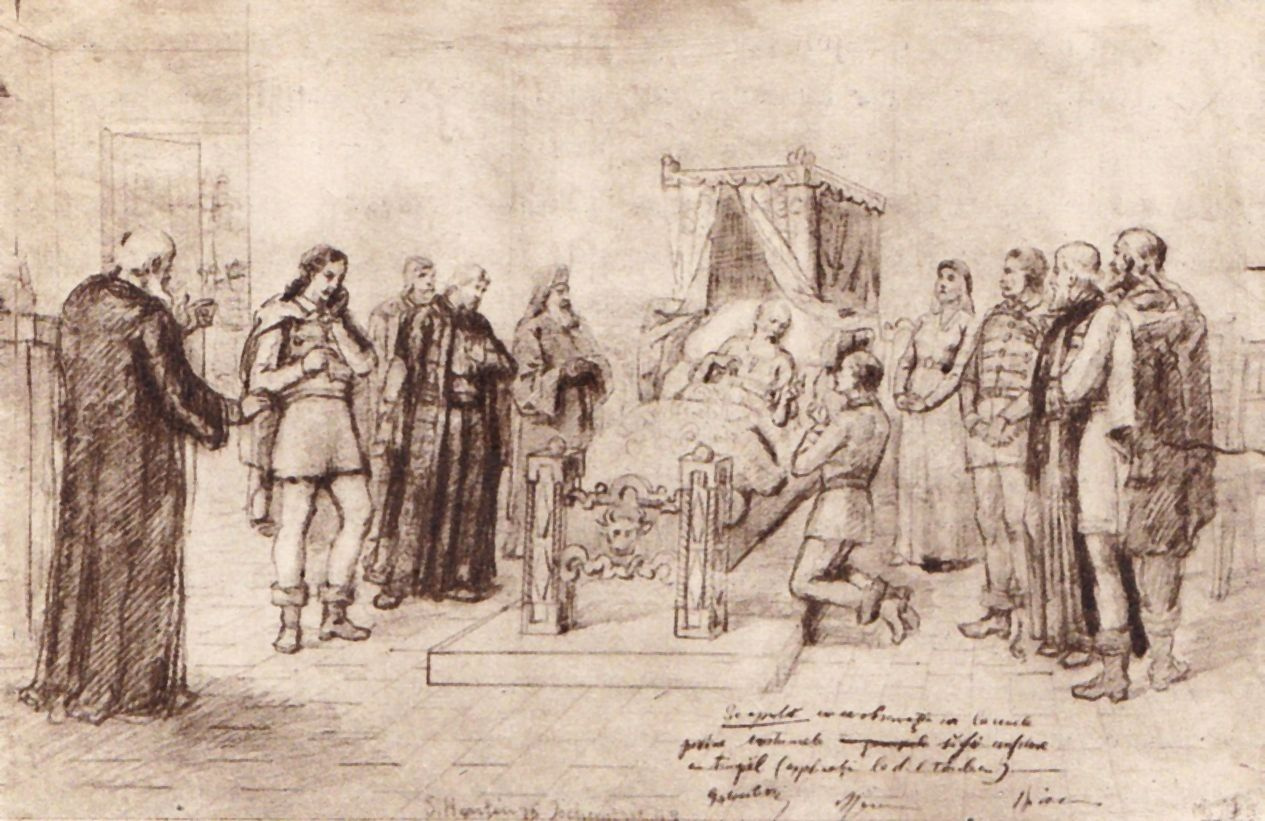
Stephen the Great's death, as depicted by Sava Henția

In a 1937 note, critic Mihail Sevastos places Silvan "among the main forerunners" of the Romanian historical novel, having "sensed that there was a literary treasure in our [historic] past." As observed by critic Eugen Lovinescu, he was notable among the neo-romantics and the Sămănătorists for his "violent imagination", which came with a "bombastic and colorful style". Medieval topics preoccupied him first and foremost, producing Dan, căpitan de plaĭ ("Dan the Highland Chieftain"), initially called Bătrânul Dan ("Old Man Dan"). It borrowed a theme from Vasile Alecsandri, showing its eponymous hero, in fact a cadaver, being taken by his steed to Tatar Crimea, as a way of honoring a debt of honor. This book was followed by Valea Albă ("White Valley", about the eponymous battle in 1476), defended by scholar Mihail Dragomirescu as "very nearly a masterpiece". It was published in 1904, just shortly ahead of a book describing Stephen the Great's death (Ștefan cel Mare pe patul morțiĭ). Dragomirescu includes this text within a cultural and ideological movement headlined by Revista Idealistă, which was the first to serialize it. He sees the novel as overall "depressing", due to its subject matter, as well as burdened by Silvan's "national mysticism" and "caricatured intuition". He nonetheless recommended it as readable, and posited that it announced Sadoveanu's later, better known, experiments in the genre.

Historian Arthur Gorovei, who was then serving as prefect, recalls being pestered by Silvan with demands that he distribute the book to schools under his watch—Silvan had hopes of increasing his income, and also of positioning himself better in the race for a literary prize. Gorovei also observes that the letter he received from Silvan was ungrammatical, but unwittingly true: the author had intended to write that "politics is bad because it steals away our writers", but his phrasing read as if "writers steal from us" (ne fură scriitorii). Silvan soon found himself challenged by his mentor Iorga, who, as a professional historian, was also investigating Stephen's reign. Iorga was especially irked by Valea Albă, which he saw as taking liberties with the historical record (whereas Silvan claimed to have based himself on the account found in Grigore Ureche's old chronicle). In May 1904, Silvan returned with a work of popular history that outlined and contextualized Stephen's entire biography. In a November letter to Iorga, he demanded clarifications about Stephen's court of boyars, having stumbled upon information in Gheorghe Ghibănescu that seemed to contradict Iorga's own.

=== Between Caraiman and Damascus ===
Silvan's five-act verse drama, Vînzător de neam ("Traitor to His Kin"), was taken up in production at the National Theater Iași for the 1905–1906 season. Despite their literary conflict, he was still backing Iorga's nationalist causes. In March 1906, he publicly sided with students arrested for rioting against foreign plays staged, in French, by the National Theater Bucharest. As a novelist, he had switched focus, and now revisited the Romanian War of Independence ahead of its 30th anniversary—with Războiul nostru de neatârnare ("Our War for Freedom"). As observed by Ciopraga, it, like all the preceding works, it is "exuberantly romantic" in the Sămănătorul vein, and echoes books of the same genre penned by Bucura Dumbravă. Războiul nostru de neatârnare was very soon after used in primers and textbooks, including a reading anthology compiled by C. S. Negoiescu in 1911.

On 22–23 July 1906, Becescu-Silvan and Theodor Rosen led a guided climb on the Caraiman Peak, advertising it with a reportage in Adevărul. The text remains noted in literary history for offering the first incidental mention of Urmuz, the future avant-garde author (a young montaineer, known back then under his birth name, Demetru Demetrescu-Buzău). Silvan's own passion for hiking pushed him to also write a guide book, the 1908 Tainele Bucegilor ("Secrets of The Bucegi"). From December 1906, his wife allowed parts of their home to be used as charity sewing rooms, in support of Ploiești's children-in-need.

Successful as a lawyer, especially in front of jury courts, Gheorghe was seen by Sevastos as a "fiery temperament". He was at the time redoing his studies of law at the University of Bucharest, which granted him a bachelor's degree in November 1906, at the same time as Emanoil Socor. Taking an interest in labor law, he represented a Chamber of Trades that sent him on inspection to Buzău, where his detailed report resulted in the local workers' guild having to sack its executive committee. After the large-scale peasants' revolt of early 1907, he defended in court the twenty-one rioters of Sângeru. During the proceedings, they impressed the public with sworn testimonies about their torturing by the Gendarmes. In a parallel trial, he obtained aquittal for three peasants accused of having robbed one of their peers at Sorani. His activity as a cultural promoter was manifested in his involvement with a Ploiești-based People's Academy. As its representative, he invited Iorga to lecture at the city's Co-operative Theater. With his wife and Dem. I. Nicolaescu, he organized a tourists' caravan that crossed the Bratocea ridge in August 1908. From here, a smaller group, comprising the writer and his friend Nicolaescu, traveled up the Teleajen valley to Cheia and Cheița, up to the border with Austria-Hungary, taking numerous photographs of the more picturesque caves and rock formations.

In 1909–1910, Silvan and I. Naum-Papazopol put out their own Ploiești-based newspaper, Lumina Satelor ("Light for the Villages"). It was noted by historian Ioan Scurtu for its advocacy of the co-operative movement, as for its "empiric formulation of an alliance between industrial workers and the peasantry." In September 1909, Silvan was one of 47 founding members of the Romanian Writers' Society, and present for its inaugural meeting at Lazăr Lyceum. He was coming to advocate for the Romanians of Austria-Hungary: in December, he was near the border, at Câmpina, conferencing at the local auditorium on the life and times of Avram Iancu, whom he called a "martyr of Romanianism". In contrast to the religious nationalists, he was also embracing Freethought. In October 1909, he had spoken at a Ploiești rally of protest against Spain, whose conservative government had shot Freethinker and educationist Francisco Ferrer; he shared the rostrum with Ion Ionescu-Quintus of the National Liberal Party (PNL), but also with radical leftists I. C. Frimu and N. D. Cocea. He was similarly present at a workers' gathering on 25 October, where he expressed his indignation that socialist organizer Christian Rakovsky had been expelled from Romania. In his address, he paid respect to the workers' cause, argued that socialist meetings resembled Early Christianity, and predicted that, like Christians, the socialists would eventually triumph over their persecutors.

Returning to Câmpina in March 1910, Silvan delivered lectures criticizing the Orthodox Church hierarchy as modern-day Pharisees. By then, he had affiliated with the Conservative-Democratic Party, as a member of its club in Ploiești. He formally joined the PNL on 21 November 1911, declaring on the occasion that he regretted not having joined "the army of liberalism" at an earlier stage in his career. In January of the next year, he spoke at a Ploiești rally against the Conservative Party and its national cabinet. He described the latter as a gathering of Phanariotes who had enslaved the Romanian King, Carol I. For the rest of the year, he was absorbed by his planned biographical novel about Jesus, and to this end visited the Holy Land (which was back then under Ottoman control) and the Kingdom of Greece. On 12 December, he wrote Galaction a letter about his experiences in Athens, Jaffa, Galilee, and especially in "extraordinary" Damascus (where he was still staying at the time, planning to later reach Amman and Jerusalem). His father died while he was abroad, but Silvan could no longer return in time to receive his inheritance—most of which vanished, leaving him with only a few religious objects.

=== Balkan-War whistleblower ===
In 1912, Silvan was back on the nationalist lecture-circuit, this time focused against the Russian Empire and its policies in Romanian-speaking Bessarabia. The topic was central to another one of his Câmpina conferences, held on 16 May under the aegis of the Cultural League for the Unity of All Romanians. Later that year, he defected to Iorga's opposition group, the Democratic Nationalist Party (PND), in preparation for scheduled parliamentary elections. At a party rally on 4 November, he took the rostrum to express criticism of Iorga, and was immediately chased out by other members. In February 1913, the writer held another conference, at Ploiești, detailing his earlier passage through Corsica, with photographs projected through a stereopticon. In mid-1913, after a new Conservative cabinet had implicated Romania in the Second Balkan War, Becescu-Silvan volunteered for service, a regular soldier (later advanced to corporal) with the 47th Reserves Regiment in Southern Dobruja. He had a running conflict with military police, which he accused of brutality. In addition, he complained that the ground troops were subjected to grueling marches, and fed on spoiled beans, with little or no medicine available for those who fell ill as a result.

Silvan first aired these sentiments in a reportage about the "squalor of the campaign", carried on 24 August by the PNL daily Viitorul. Upon his return to civilian life, he founded a newspaper called Eroiĭ Prahoveĭ, in which he praised the servicemen while airing his claims of mistreatment. On 7 October 1913, he and the typographer Ion Mateescu, who had similarly revealed details of the campaign, were arrested on charges on charges of insubordination. His mandate, when issued, asked him to present himself before the Fifth Army Corps tribunal in Constanța, on charges of having defamed the Romanian Land Forces. The prosecutors brought up the Viitorul piece as a central piece of evidence against Silvan, but he was aquited, on 21 October, as it was ruled that he had no intention of harming the army's own reputation.

The subsequent weeks witnessed the PNL's preparation for a return to power in the legislative election of February 1914. In late November 1913, Silvan took part in the "great assembly of villagers" from Prahova County, where he presented the PNL platform to the peasant masses. On 6 December, Viitorul ran his takedown of Stelian Popescu, a Conservative-Democratic member of the Deputies' Assembly, had warned about the danger of a peasant uprising in Prahova. In this piece, Silvan accused Popescu of having insulted his peasant constituents, and also implied that, if anyone had a vested interest in stirring up trouble, it was Popescu himself. Silvan himself passed through an unexpected PNL-primary on 13 January, obtaining an eligible position on the party list, with 90 votes—below candidates such as Ionescu-Quintus, Alexandru Radovici, and George Valentin Bibescu. He was designated for the third college, which he won in a landslide, with 1,924 votes. He was the second-placed after his friend and party colleague Nicolaescu (who had 2,008 votes); the opposition groups, respectively led by Popescu (Conservative-Democratic) and Vasile Kogălniceanu (Conservative), only placed in the low hundreds.

Silvan co-sponsored a specific bill proposing for constitutional reform, which was brought before the Assembly on 24 February. In an address of late March, he openly demanded land reform with expropriation of the landed gentry, also demanding a merger of all class-based electoral colleges into one. He was mocked by the Conservative press, which commented that "his poetic fantasy" had gotten the better of him. Silvan now found himself opposed to Iorga and A. C. Cuza, whose PND only supported land reform, without electoral changes. Also in March, Cuza personally intervened to present his group's reply, after Silvan had reprimanded Iorga. During one of these exchanges, Cuza mistakenly referred to him as "Silvescu-Becan"—which became the writer's enduring nickname, alongside Maurul. The Assembly ultimately decided in favor of reforming the organic law of 1866. This decision also made it necessary to have repeat elections, for a nominal constituent assembly, which were scheduled in May. Becescu-Silvan retook his seat with 2,054 votes, just below Nicolaescu.

=== Ententist and exile ===
Confirmed after election day, a PNL cabinet, under Ion I. C. Brătianu, maintained a hold on political life and began the reform process, but these were soon stalled by the challenges posed by World War I. The still-neutral country divided itself between those who wished to join the Entente, generally from the PNL, and those who, as Conservatives or leftists, either favored neutralism or, as "Germanophiles", an alliance with the Central Powers. Silvan supported the Ententist option: in January 1915, his topical polemic with the socialist doyen Constantin Dobrogeanu Gherea was published as a brochure, Război sau neutralitate ("War or Neutrality"). He was also present for the December 1915 Assembly session, which allowed both the Ententists and the Germanophiles to outline their positions. His speech was poorly rated by the PNL's Ion G. Duca, who reports that Becescu-Silvan was easily eclipsed by the Conservative-Democrat leader, Take Ionescu, by the 78-year-old Conservative doyen, Petre P. Carp, as well as by various other experienced orators.

During February 1916, Silvan was internationally noted for proposing "a tax on war profits and on export surplus." On 24 May, during a reorganization of the PNL in Prahova County, he was made a member of its administrative committee. In August, after Brătianu had signed a pact with the Entente, Romania declared war on the Central Powers. Initially, Romanian troops registered some successes in Transylvania. On 8 September, Erotheea and Gheorghe presided over a parastas service honoring Ion Belciug of Bertea—who had been identified as one of the first victims of the offensive. Held at Cheia Monastery, this ceremony was attended by 2,000 reserve soldiers. During the subsequent routing of Romanian forces, Romanian Transylvanians joined in the exodus. In November 1916, Becescu and Ploiești mayor George G. Ionescu issued a plea to the city population, urging them to accommodate these new arrivals.

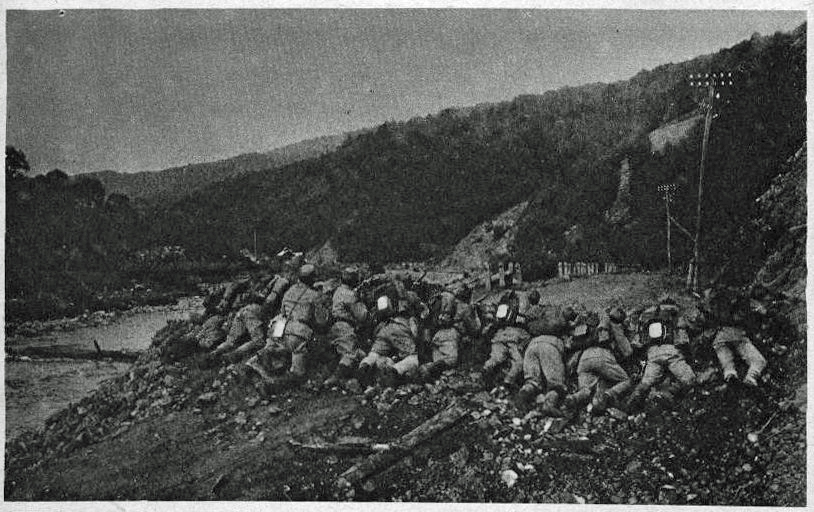
Romanian troops defending Predeal in December 1916

Upon the fall of Bucharest in December, the state authorities and the surviving troops barricaded themselves in Western Moldavia, where they had direct, but uncertain, support from the Russian Empire; the Assembly continued to meet at Iași, and Becescu was present for its sessions. In late February 1917, Odessky Listok newspaper in Kherson Governorate hosted a Becescu article, later published in the PNL's Mișcarea. Here, he argued for continued Russian support of the Romanian Front, proposing that news of Romanian defeatism were being invented by a fifth column of Germanophiles, and indicating that "revanchism" against the Central Powers was the generic state of mind of Romanian troops. Shortly after, the February Revolution swept over Russia, and pushed progressivism at the forefront of debates among Ententists. At Iași, a parliamentary party, the "Laborites", emerged round Nicolae L. Lupu, who openly embraced revolutionary Russia as a model to follow. After being presented with the Laborites' own project for land reform, Silvan declared that one would have to be mad to join their ranks.

The October Revolution and the armistice of December 1917 left Romania exposed, and pushed the war cabinet into signing its own ceasefire agreement. The Romanian legislators, Silvan included, sought temporary refuge in the Ukrainian People's Republic. The parliamentary stenographer, Henri Stahl, recalls traveling with him and Grigore Iunian aboard the SS Durostor, on a perilous journey, through crushing ice, between Odessa and Kherson; he recalls being impressed by Silvan as an "interesting swarthy type" with a "rather fine talent for writing". In March 1918, Alexandru Marghiloman's Conservative-Germanophile cabinet was sworn in, allowing for a separate peace with the Central Powers to be signed in May. Silvan withdrew from politics ahead of new elections, and isolated himself in the countryside of his native Covurlui County; on 29 September, after he had been accused by the Conservatives at Steagul of having embezzled government funds destined for an Assembly cafeteria, he responded in Mișcarea—demanding that proof be presented or that the accusation be retracted.

=== 1918 return and 1919 setbacks ===
The overall situation was reversed soon after: the renewed association with the Entente, following its advances in the region, also led to Marghiloman's downfall. A new war cabinet, formed around the military, rejoined the Entente just before the November Armistice. This also opened the path for the PNL's return to power, under a fifth Brătianu cabinet. Already in January 1919, Silvan won a primary in Prahova, designating him a local candidate in the scheduled election of November (now held without electoral colleges). In March, he emerged as a critic of government policies, and positioned himself in such a way that his departure from the PNL was seen as imminent. At the time, Romania was in the process of absorbing Transylvania and was clashin with the Yugoslav Kingdom over ownership of the Banat. Silvan was present for an anti-Yugoslav rally, held at Ploiești on 30 May.

On 21 June 1919, Silvan presented himself as an Assembly candidate for the November election. He headlined his own group list, as president of a "National Peasants' and Workers' Party". Writing in the anti-government Socialismul newspaper, Gheorghe Petrescu-Ghempet argued that Becescu was acting on orders from Ionescu-Quintus, who had a quarrel with the PNL's own Raul Bulfinsky; according to Ghempet, Silvan's list was made of non-electable candidates, and was only meant to secure a seat for himself, as Quintus' right-hand man. Prahova witnessed important gains for the Socialist Party, especially in the industrial hub of Câmpina. In the aftermath, Socialismul claimed that Becescu had desperately tried to bribe workers into voting his way. He himself failed to win a seat, falling behind the PNL list and others, including three Socialists (Alexandru Dobrogeanu-Gherea, Alexandru Dunăreanu, Gheorghe Cristescu). His party colleague, Stan Morărescu, placed better and entered the Assembly.

Silvan managed to recover his status in politics by joining Alexandru Averescu's new party, the People's League, and taking a Senate seat by-elections in February 1920. A week into his office, he had another publicized clash with Lupu (also a senator), whom he depicted as a hireling of Soviet Russia. He ran for an Assembly seat at Prahova in May 1920, as a League candidate—alongside his old rival Stelian Popescu; he won this time, as did Popescu. His focus was on further reforms: in October, he proposed that the Senate be redesigned into a Romanian Storting, with no seats lifetime reserved for the prelates or the crown princes. He also supported the abolition of several enduring royal prerogatives, such as a monarch's right to dissolve the Assembly without senatorial consent.

Opposed to Averescu's cabinet Silvan and party colleague Amos Frâncu spoke of resigning from the Assembly in July 1921. At issue was the privatization of the Reșița Works, which Averescu had passed through by making parliamentarians into stakeholders. Silvan went back on his decision. On 8 December 1921, speaking in response to a message from King Ferdinand I, he criticized the government while praising Averescu's character. In January 1922, the cabinet fell after a motion of no confidence, which passed after speeches delivered by Silvan and N. D. Cocea. The circumstances were seen as humiliating by Iorga, who argued that no pre-1916 legislature would have tolerated such unpersuasive speakers to pass a motion. During the general election of March, the People's Party (as the People's League had come to be known) was soundly defeated by the PNL and the Peasants' Party. Its Prahova list was headlined by Averescu himself, who only took 1,684 votes. Also on the list, Silvan had 1,511 votes, which was a tenth of what had been registered by the second Peasantist deputy elected in that county (as the absolute winner, Ionescu-Quintus had 37,421 votes).

=== Final years ===
The writer continued to be active politically, and later in December 1922 was a delegate at the People's Party national congress. Here, he was again pushing for more constitutional reforms. In early 1923, as Valea Albă went through its third edition, he announced that he had prepared for print another medieval-themed novel, called Ana Doamna. One of Silvan's final articles, carried by Dimineața in the early days of 1924, expressed his thoughts on the scandal erupted at Cuibul cu barză Church, whose congregation was turning Eastern Protestant. As argued by Galaction, it showed him at his best, "independent, original, and vigorous." Galaction, who was an ordained priest, found that he could no longer agree with Silvan on religious topics: their rarely saw each other; the last time that they did so what as at a monastery in Suzana, and they ended up quarreling. Elsewhere, Galaction was explicitly critical of his former friend's positioning, indicating that he still viewed Silvan as a Freethinker, whose interventions were as an unwanted third-party. Himself an ordained priest, Galaction summarized Silvan's stance as: "that church of yours is moribund." The Ploiești journalist Ion Gheorghe Stăvărescu argues differently, describing Becescu as a "Christian fanatic" who "always carried the cross on his bosom".

In April 1923, local newspapers reported on Silvan's illness, which had pushed to seek isolation and treatment at Cheia. An unsigned article in Virtutea weekly argued that concerns voiced in the Averescu-tied press were exaggerated: "our dapper fellow citizen" only had laryngitis. By November, Silvan had been dispatched to Brâncovenesc Hospital, suffering from a kidney disease. He was released soon after, because complications were delaying a surgical intervention. In March 1924, it was reported that he had pyelonephritis, and that Thoma Ionescu of Colțea Hospital had refused to operate on him, seeing him as too frail to survive the procedure. Virtutea's reporter commented at the time that only "the miracle of Providence" could be called on to heal the dying politician.

Silvan died in Ploiești on 29 March 1924. Upon registering the news, Galaction commented that he had finally found the Jesus he was seeking in Galilee and Jerusalem. In accordance with his dying request, Silvan was supposed to be buried at Cheia Monastery on 1 April. His death announcement reported that he was instead assigned a tomb at Viișoara Cemetery in Ploiești, with the funeral service delivered at Sfânta Vineri Church. In May, his tomb was attested as being on Cheia's grounds, with a parastas service delivered by the entirety of its monks—who had reportedly known and admired Silvan.

== Legacy ==
In March 1924, an obituary piece appeared in Gândul Nostru magazine, penned by Silvan's younger friend, Sandu Teleajen. It mentioned his utopian project, which was to dam the Teleajen River at Suzana, creating a navigable lake for boat tours linking "climate resorts". Virtutea of 12 April argued that, though Silvan was no longer holding offices inside the Averescu party, his death had left the local chapter depressed, with his colleagues realizing that he had always been their actual manager. His natural successor was Rudolf Bulfinsky, who, like the deceased, superficially presented as "scatterbrained [and] giddy". In a polemical piece of 1929, Stăvărescu argued that Silvan had been unduly forgotten, and claimed that the monks of Cheia and Suzana, who owed him their increased prosperity, had failed to even include him in their beadroll. Three years later, the grave became a regular stop on a pilgrimage tours organized by the Patriarch Miron Christian Association. Erotheea continued to be active on the cultural scene, and in 1934 was collecting and distributing books for impoverished students, as part of an effort driven by the League for the Cultural Unity of All Romanians. In early 1943, Leonida Secrețeanu issued a public call for Silvan's relatives to help him complete the relevant chapter in an anthology of Prahova-based poets.

Already in 1932, novelist Cezar Petrescu, who discussed the influx of Romanian novelists in the interwar, observed that the preceding schools of literature had been comparatively unsatisfactory. According to Petrescu, novelists such as Becescu-Silvan, Traian Demetrescu, Radu Rosetti and Alexandru Vlahuță had had their "indisputable, if partial, merits", but "did not stand the test of time." Alongside Ciopraga, various mid-20th-century scholars also referred to Becescu-Silvan as minor, flickering presence on the literary scene. Bratu dismissed him as one of "Macedonski's forgotten cronies", while Mircea Zaciu only spoke of him in relation to Mihail Sadoveanu's correspondence, as one specimen in "the petty fauna of Bucharest and provincial magazines". Zaciu proposed that any research into his background was a form of entomology.

During the latter stages of the Romanian communist regime, which saw a recovery of nationalist themes, Becescu was occasionally used as a positive reference. In a 1976 overview of novels mentioning the War of Independence, literary historian Teodor Vârgolici covered Războiul nostru de neatârnare. Vârgolici mistakenly believed that its final two volumes had remained unpublished—until corrected by archivist I. Cramer. Another historian interested in the work was Gheorghe S. Ștefănescu, who called attention to its "sobriety and cursivity", concluding that Silvan had "veritable artistic qualities", which set him apart from other authors who had documented the independence war. After the Romanian Revolution of 1989, Becescu returned to obscurity: in 1995, scholar Mircea Anghelescu noted that he was entirely absent from a biographical dictionary of Romanian writers, as issued by Zaciu, Marian Papahagi and Aurel Sasu, suggesting that this needed correction in future editions.
