= Bughea =

Bughea may refer to several places in Romania:

- Bughea de Jos, a commune in Argeș County
- Bughea de Jos, a village in the commune Gura Vitioarei in Prahova County
- Bughea de Sus, a commune in Argeș County
- Bughea de Sus, a village in the commune Teișani in Prahova County
- Bughea (Râul Târgului), a tributary of the Râul Târgului in Argeș County
- Bughea (Teleajen), a tributary of the Teleajen in Prahova County
