= Cheia Monastery =

Orthodox complex in Romania

Coordinates: 44.45675°N 25.94335°E

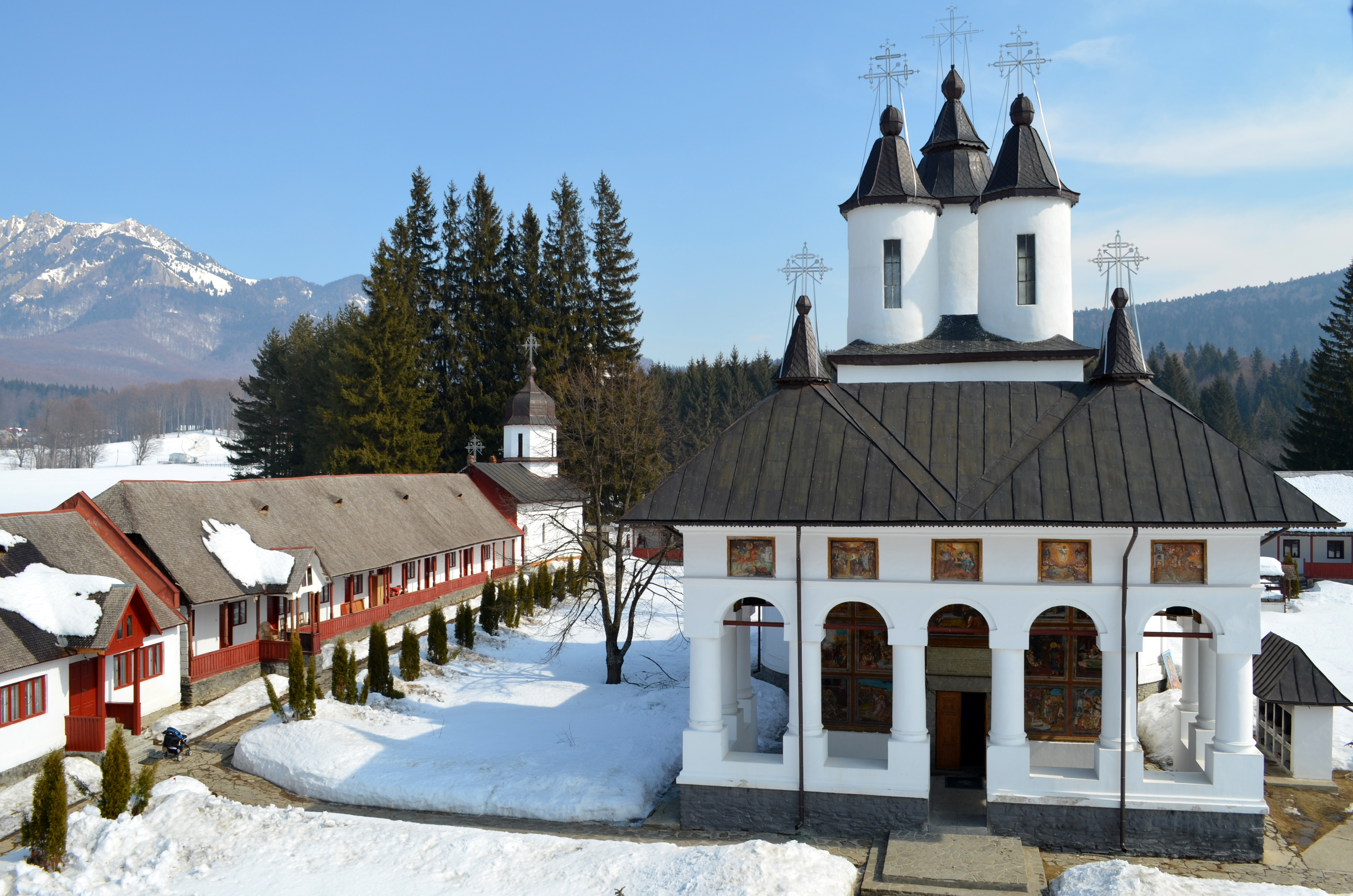
- The central courtyard of Cheia in 2012

Religion
- Affiliation: Romanian Orthodox Church

Location
- Location: Cheia, Prahova County, Romania
- Interactive map of Cheia Monastery

Architecture
- Completed: 1830s

Website
- http://www.manastireacheia.ro

Cheia Monastery (Romanian: Mănăstirea Cheia) is a Orthodox-Church complex in Romania, located southeast of Cheia resort. Territorially, it belongs to Măneciu commune, in Prahova County. The current monastery of monks was dedicated to the Holy Trinity; its roots may date back to the 17th century, but a stone church was only erected in the 1830s. While located in Wallachia and initially subordinated to its metropolitan bishops, Cheia's monastic community was always intimately linked with the Romanian communities of Transylvania, which sent shepherds and immigrants down the Teleajen under various regimes. The immediate area is one of the "keys" that allowed circulation between Transylvania and Wallachia, across what was for long also a political border, lasting to the dissolution of Austria-Hungary in 1918.

The monastery gained importance during the Kingdom of Romania, when the Ciucaș Mountains were opened for tourism by Gheorghe Becescu-Silvan and other hikers. This economic upswing was interrupted by World War I, when Cheia was occupied, then briefly annexed, by Austria-Hungary. Becescu-Silvan resumed his activities during the first years of Greater Romania, and was buried on the monastery grounds after his death in 1924. The monastery had by then been land-endowed and was in the process of being restored and expanded. In the late 1930s, it served as a place of punishment for Old Calendarists, condemned for disobeying the Orthodox Patriarchy. This punitive function was expanded upon in the 1950s by the communist regime, under which a dissident prelate, Nicolae Popoviciu, was likewise banished to Cheia. Under communism, the monastery lost much of its land, which it recovered, then lost again, following the Romanian Revolution of 1989.

== Location ==
Cheia Monastery is located exactly between Tâmpa and Cheița brooklets, just south of the traditional frontier between Wallachia (or Muntenia) and Transylvania (Țara Bârsei). Its name refers to the Bratocea ridge of the Ciucaș which, with its north-to-south alignment, forms a "key" (cheie)—in that it allows for a crossing between the two regions. Though included in Măneciu, it is located some 20 kilometers away from the commune center in Măneciu-Ungureni, and at roughly the same distance from any village other than Cheia itself.

== History ==
=== Origins and early history ===
Religious scholar Iustin Marchiș observes that Cheia was intimately tied to the presence of Orthodox shepherds and refugees from outside Wallachia, namely those who began leaving the Principality of Transylvania in stages during the 17th and 18th centuries. According to a tradition he cites, the first Cheia church, a wooden skete, was built before 1700; however, the first documentary trace is from 1770, when a new building is known to have been erected, and dedicated to Saint Nicholas, by shepherds from Săcele. It was destroyed in 1777, reportedly by the Ottoman Army. The site remained barren until 1790, when yet another wooden church was raised—in this instance, it was named after The Dormition. Marchiș observes that Cheia truly dates to 1835, when monastic activity was revived by the Bishopric of Buzău, then under Chesarie Căpățână. It was then that Damaschin and Iustin Bârsan, hieromonks from Săcele, were invited to settle here. With help from the local peasants and stonemasons, they erected the core of the modern-day complex. In this form, it became a Trinity church, with traditional murals done by Naum Zugravul; four icons were done by Gheorghe Tattarescu.

During the time of Cheia's restoration, Transylvania was an an Austrian principality, administered as a separate entity within the Hungarian Crown. The border crossing with Wallachia was nominally at Vama Șanțurilor (south of Săcele), but, on the Wallachian side, this spot had become virtually unreachable by regular travelers, with the usable road stopping exactly on monastery grounds. The road to there was repaired by Mihail Ghica, who was titular Great Ban in 1836. The portion linking Cheia to Săcele was only built in 1836–1841 by the authorities of Saac County, using plans drafted by an engineering apprentice, Wilhelm Loriseca. In mid-1848, shortly after the quelling of a Wallachian liberal revolution, Cheia's monks helped rebel David P. Almășanu escape back across the border, into his native Transylvania. In 1850, two members of the monastic community, known as Orest and Ipatie, established the first fully Romanian monastic cell on Mount Athos. Around the same time, Wallachian monks took in Picu Pătruț, who was tonsured at Cheia—before returning to Săcele to continue his work as a calligrapher and miniaturist.

Functional transformations of the monastery and the surrounding landscape continued after the Wallachian Metropolis was merged into the autocephalous Romanian Orthodox Church—reflecting Wallachia's own merger into the United Principalities, which then became the Kingdom of Romania. Before World War I, Transylvanian pilgrims continued to arrive there from what had become Austria-Hungary. In January 1885, the Romanian Metropolitan-Primate, Calinic Miclescu, began considering a plan whereby monks from small sketes would be "concentrated" at Cheia. Reporting on this "laudable measure", Curierul newspaper noted that Cheia "has a charming positioning and is also very suitable for the monastic life." During early 1900, a Belgian–Romanian Society expressed interest in constructing a private railway that would have linked the monastery to Vălenii de Munte and, through it, to the county capital in Ploiești.

Ciucaș area, including Cheia, came to be valued as a tourist sport due to efforts by writer-politician Gheorghe Becescu-Silvan and his wife Erotheea. In mid-1908, they led a tourists' caravan into the area. Silvan dreamed of damming the brooklets to set up a navigable lake for boat tours, with the monastery serving as the central element of a "climate resort". Though this project was not taken up, Prahova journalist Ion Gheorghe Stăvărescu credits him and his advertising with having greatly increased the church's revenue. In 1910, the Romanian state recognized that the monastic community fully owned the land it has previously only administered on behalf of the bishops.

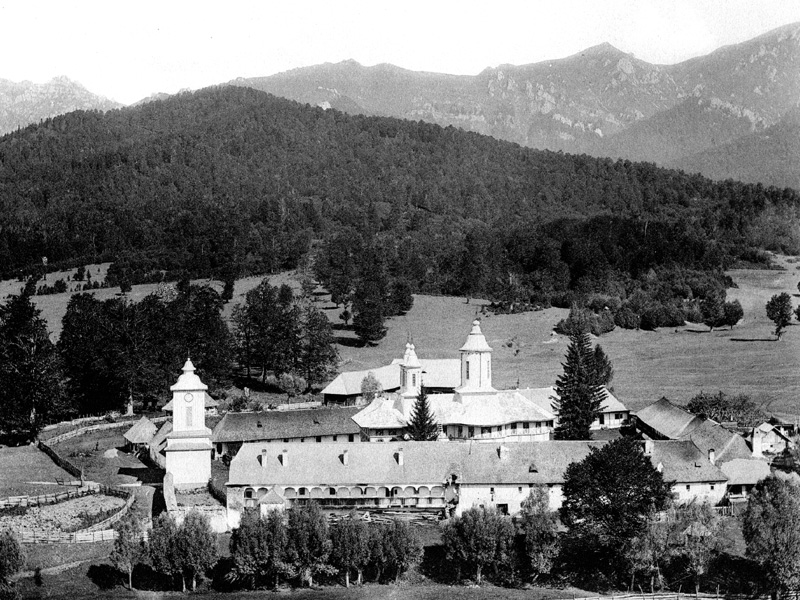
General view of Cheia, c. 1900

=== World War I and interwar ===
During the blizzards of 1912–1913, the monks pleaded for a new chapel, which would have allowed them to pray in a more easily heated location, and for a new system of water pipes. A visitor of the period reported in Adevărul that the monastery had become easily reachable. The road to Săcele and the other Seven Villages was accessible to horse-drawn carriages, and ended at an electric rail that took visitors all the way to Dârste in southern Brassó (Brașov). The visitor also reported that the monks owned a fenced hay meadow, and that there was a footpath, carved by local border guards, linking the church to the nearby peaks. Shortly after this modernization period, monastic life was affected by World War I. The monastery was among the tourist sites that were closed off for the public in June 1916, during the final stage of Romania's neutrality.

Following a pact sealed in August, Romania declared war on Austria-Hungary and the other Central Powers. There were initial successes in the subsequent Battle of Transylvania. On 8 September, Erotheea and Gheorghe Becescu-Silvan presided over a parastas service honoring Ion Belciug of Bertea—identified as one of the first heroes of the Romanian offensive. Held at Cheia and handled by its monks, this ceremony was attended by some 2,000 reserve soldiers. The site also attracted Transylvanian civilians who fled the battles, and who reportedly found themselves threated by Lieutenant Cariadi of the local Gendarmes—Cariadi reportedly feared that the war was set to end badly for Romania. Prahova in its entirety was indeed occupied by the Central Powers in December 1916. It was at Cheia that, during May 1917, the occupation authorities detained Sofronie Vulpescu, the Bishop of Râmnic, whom they regarded as politically unreliable.

When, in May 1918, Romania sued for peace, the mountainous north of Prahova, including Cheia, was set aside as Austro-Hungarian spoils of war. The situation was fully reversed after the November 1918 Armistice, which inaugurated the dissolution of Austria-Hungary, also helping in the union of Transylvania with Romania—with Cheia now located near the center of Greater Romania. Tourism was resumed soon after, again with support from Gheorghe Becescu-Silvan. He himself went there for treatment in early 1923, one year before he was diagnosed with untreatable pyelonephritis. Buried at Ploiești in March 1924, Silvan's body was reburied on monastery grounds later that year.

A chapel was finally added on the north-western side of the complex in 1927, under hieromonk Grigore Munteanu; around the same time, Gheorghe I. Cepoiu was called in to redo the 1830s murals, which had been irreversibly damaged by time. By 1928, Cheia was serving as a retreat for the clergy of Bucharest, led by Tit Simedrea. In 1936, Patriarch Miron ordered a suppression of Old Calendarists, some of whom accepted imprisonment at Cheia in lieu of excommunication. By 1938, they were said to include several peasants and a parish priest, all made to attend services under the Gregorian calendar.

=== Communism and later ===
Shortly after its establishment in 1948, the Romanian communist regime began a clampdown against non-compliant prelates. From 1950, Cheia served as a place of exile for Nicolae Popoviciu, the deposed Bishop of Oradea, who died there, reportedly as a result of continued mistreatment, some ten years later. In tandem, the governing Workers' Party was purging its own nonconformists, including Miron Constantinescu. In the process, Constantinescu's 1935 retreat at Cheia Monastery was brought up against him, as a sign of his internalized hostility toward Marxism-Leninism: "his 'monastic solitude' helped him learn practices alien to our party. For years he stored up all sorts of feelings of discontent, waiting for the moment when he could strike a blow against the party leadership".

A nationalization process affected Cheia estate in 1963, when some of its land became part of the state patrimony. In 1965, the monastery structure was again modified, with the addition of a rest-home for the senior clergy. After that date, Cheia also became a designated metochion of the Patriarchy. In the 1960s, it was reachable by forest railway out of Măneciu-Ungureni, which was itself connected by road to Vălenii (and, beyond, to Ploiești). Cepoiu's art was restored in the 1980s, again with help from the local congregants. As reported by Marchiș, at the time Cheia had an art school, a choral ensemble, and a library.

Fo0llowing an anti-communist uprising in late 1989, the land taken over in 1963 went to Romsilva, a new state-owned enterprise. The monks fought to have it returned to them, and in 1994 obtained a favorable decision from the tribunal in Vălenii. This decision was in turn disputed by two Măneciu locals, Gheorghe Gogan and Ioan Hangiu, who, as reported by Jurnalul Național, stated a controversial and ambiguous claim to lands "behind the monastery". Their claim was itself recognized by court decision, but disputed for more than four years by the monks, as well as by Măneciu's town hall.
