= Dâmbu =

Dâmbu may refer to several places in Romania:

- Dâmbu, a village in Sânpetru de Câmpie Commune, Mureș County
- Dâmbu, a village in the town of Băicoi, Prahova County
- Dâmbu (river), a tributary of the Teleajen in Prahova County

== See also ==
- Dambou, or dambu, a dish in West African cuisine
