= Industrial development in the Principality of Wallachia =

Throughout the 1850s, the Principality of Wallachia underwent an industrial revolution which yielded, among others, the first oil refinery in the World. Six years after the first Wallachian industrial establishment was completed (1853), the country united with the Principality of Moldavia to form Romania.

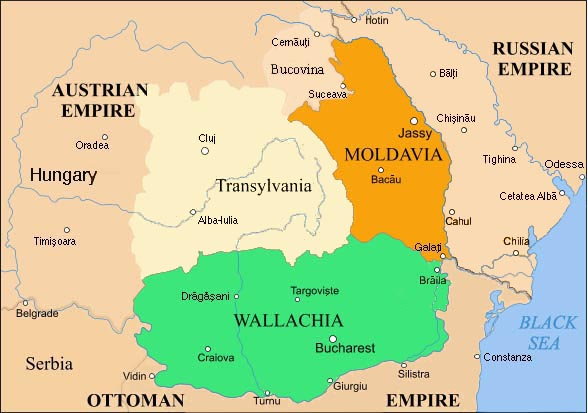
Wallachia (green) between 1829 and 1859

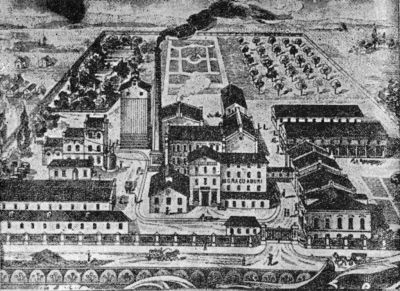
The Assan Steam Mill

== Assan's steam mill ==
The first industrial establishment based on mechanized work and steam power was introduced in 1853, in the form of the Assan Steam Mill. The mill also carried out oil pressing and brandy distilling. Situated on the outskirts of Bucharest, it was founded by George Assan, using modern machinery from Vienna. Assan ran several pharmacies and wine shops which enabled him to purchase the machinery and build the mill. After Assan's death in 1866, the mill was taken over by his wife, Alexandrina. The facility changed hands again in 1884, when it was taken over by the Assans' sons. The mill remained active into the 20th century.

== The world's first oil refinery ==
The most notable accomplishment of Wallachia's industrial revolution was the building of the World's first industrial oil refinery in 1856-1857. It was built by Teodor Mehedinţeanu. Situated at Râfov, near Ploiești, the refinery had a processing capacity of 7.5 tons per day. Two more important firsts resulted from this achievement. Wallachia (and by extension, Romania) became the first country in the world with an officially recorded crude oil production, 275 tons. Also in 1857, Bucharest became the first city in the world to use lamp oil for public illumination. The next two countries to record oil production were the United States and Italy in 1860.

== Other establishments ==
Food industries developed at Brăila starting from the 1830s.

In 1855, a brick factory which employed the use of machinery was founded in Bucharest. It was a military asset, being run by the Cavalry commander Serdar Filipescu.
