= Valea Orății River =

Valea Orății River may refer to:

- Valea Orății, a tributary of the Prahova in Romania
- Valea Orății, a tributary of the Teleajen in Romania
