= Ghighiu =

Ghighiu may refer to the following places in Romania:

- Ghighiu (Sărata), a tributary of the Sărata in Prahova and Ialomița Counties
- Ghighiu (Teleajen), a tributary of the Teleajen in Prahova County
- Ghighiu, a village in the commune Bărcănești, Prahova County
