= Bughea (Teleajen) =

- Location within Romania

Location
- Country: Romania
- Counties: Prahova County
- Villages: Bughea de Sus, Bughea de Jos

Physical characteristics
- Mouth: Teleajen
  - location: Gura Vitioarei
  - coordinates: 45.1280°N 26.0276°E
- Length: 18 km (11 mi)
- Basin size: 27 km^{2} (10 sq mi)

Basin features
- Progression: Teleajen→ Prahova→ Ialomița→ Danube→ Black Sea

The Bughea is a right tributary of the river Teleajen in Romania. It flows into the Teleajen near Gura Vitioarei. Its length is 18 km (11 mi) and its basin size is 27 km^{2} (10 sq mi).
