= Telejenel =

River in Romania

Telejenel Valea Stânei
- Location within Romania

Location
- Country: Romania
- Counties: Prahova County

Physical characteristics
- Mouth: Teleajen
  - location: Lake Măneciu
  - coordinates: 45.333°N 25.986°E
- Length: 22 km (14 mi)
- Basin size: 74 km^{2} (29 sq mi)

Basin features
- Progression: Teleajen→ Prahova→ Ialomița→ Danube→ Black Sea
- Tributaries
  - left: Boncuța, Pârâul Cetății, Zăvoarele
  - right: Pârâul Alb, Șipotele

The Telejenel is a left tributary of the river Teleajen in Romania. It discharges into the Teleajen near Măneciu-Ungureni. Its length is 22 km (14 mi) and its basin size is 74 km^{2} (29 sq mi). The upper reach of the river is also known as Valea Stânei.
