= Crasna (Teleajen) =

- Location within Romania

Location
- Country: Romania
- Counties: Prahova County
- Villages: Schiulești, Homorâciu

Physical characteristics
- Mouth: Teleajen
  - location: Izvoarele
  - coordinates: 45.2721°N 26.0213°E
- Length: 22 km (14 mi)
- Basin size: 51 km^{2} (20 sq mi)

Basin features
- Progression: Teleajen→ Prahova→ Ialomița→ Danube→ Black Sea
- Tributaries
  - left: Crăsnuța

The Crasna is a right tributary of the river Teleajen in Romania. It discharges into the Teleajen in Izvoarele. Its length is 22 km (14 mi) and its basin size is 51 km^{2} (20 sq mi).
