= Berești =

- Town
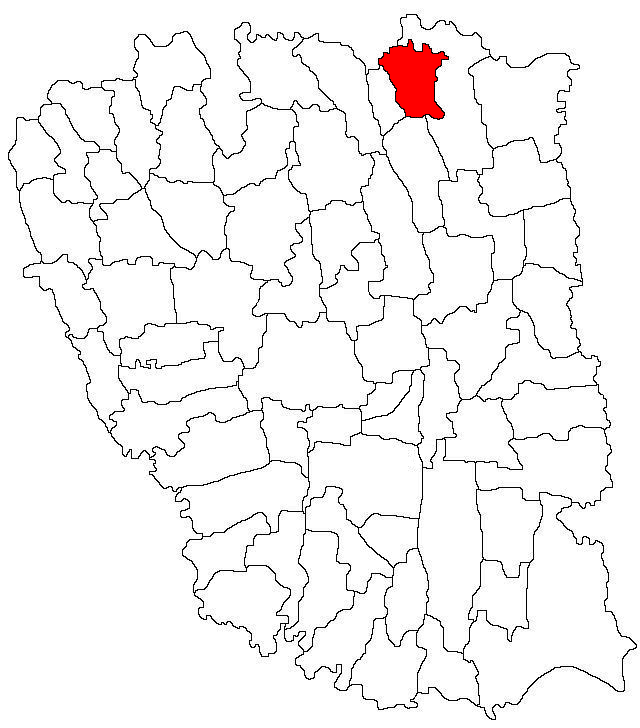
- Location in Galați County

- Location in Romania
- Coordinates: 46°6′N 27°53′E
- Country: Romania
- County: Galați
- Established: 1484 (first mentioned)

Government
  - Mayor (2024–2028): Mihai-Lucian Bejan (PNL)
- Area: 47.12 km^{2} (18.19 sq mi)
- Elevation: 140 m (460 ft)
- Population (2021-12-01): 2,473
  - Density: 52.48/km^{2} (135.9/sq mi)
- Time zone: UTC+02:00 (EET)
  - Summer (DST): UTC+03:00 (EEST)
- Postal code: 805100
- Area code: (+40) 0236
- Vehicle reg.: GL
- Website: www.orasulberesti.ro

Berești is a town in Galați County, Romania. It is situated in the historical region of Western Moldavia.

The town is situated in the southern part of the Moldavian Plateau, at an altitude of 140 m (460 ft). It is located in the northeastern part of Galați County, at the junction of county roads DJ242A and DJ242B, about 83 km (52 mi) north of the county seat, Galați, on the border with Vaslui County.

Historical population
Year	Pop.	±%
1977	4,155	—
1992	3,948	−5.0%
2002	3,601	−8.8%
2011	2,853	−20.8%
2021	2,473	−13.3%
Source: Census data

At the 2021 census, the town had a population of 2,473, of which 91.47% were Romanians.

== Natives ==
- Gheorghe Becescu-Silvan (1875–1924), writer, politician, and mountaineer
- Paul Bujor (1862–1952), zoologist, politician, and writer
- Maria Grapini (born 1954), businesswoman and politician
