= Ghighiu (Teleajen) =

- Location within Romania

Location
- Country: Romania
- Counties: Prahova County
- Villages: Ghighiu, Râfov, Antofiloaia

Physical characteristics
- Mouth: Teleajen
  - coordinates: 44.8637°N 26.1520°E
- Length: 10 km (6.2 mi)
- Basin size: 28 km^{2} (11 sq mi)

Basin features
- Progression: Teleajen→ Prahova→ Ialomița→ Danube→ Black Sea

The Ghighiu is a right tributary of the river Teleajen in Romania. It flows into the Teleajen in Antofiloaia. Its length is 10 km (6.2 mi) and its basin size is 28 km^{2} (11 sq mi).
