= Izvoarele, Prahova =

Izvoarele
- Commune
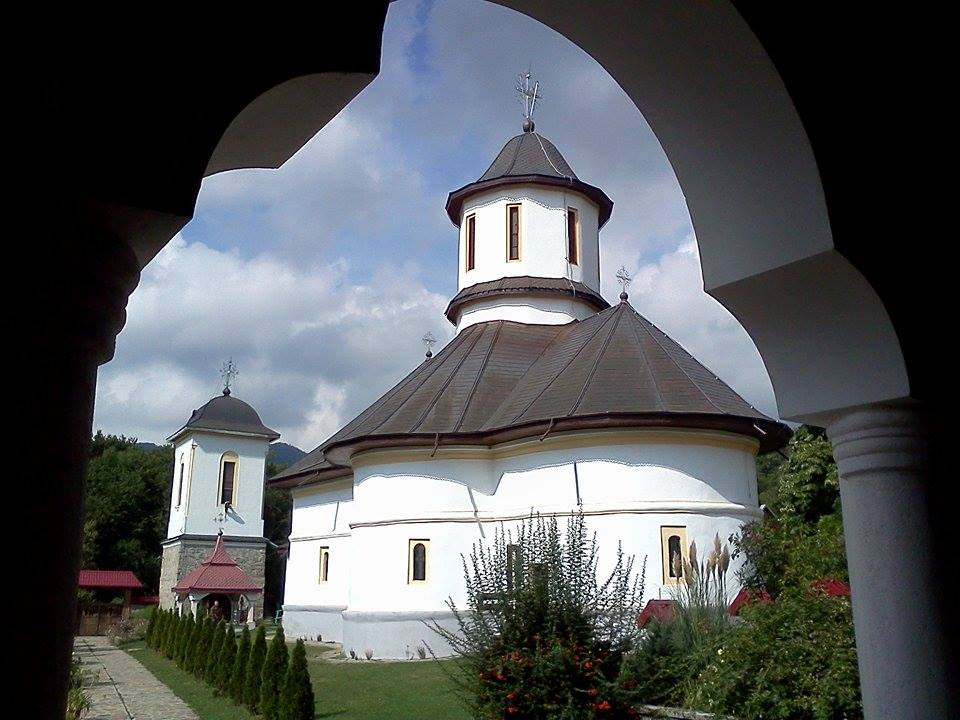
- Crasna hermitage in Schiulești village

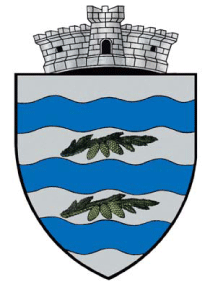
- Coat of arms

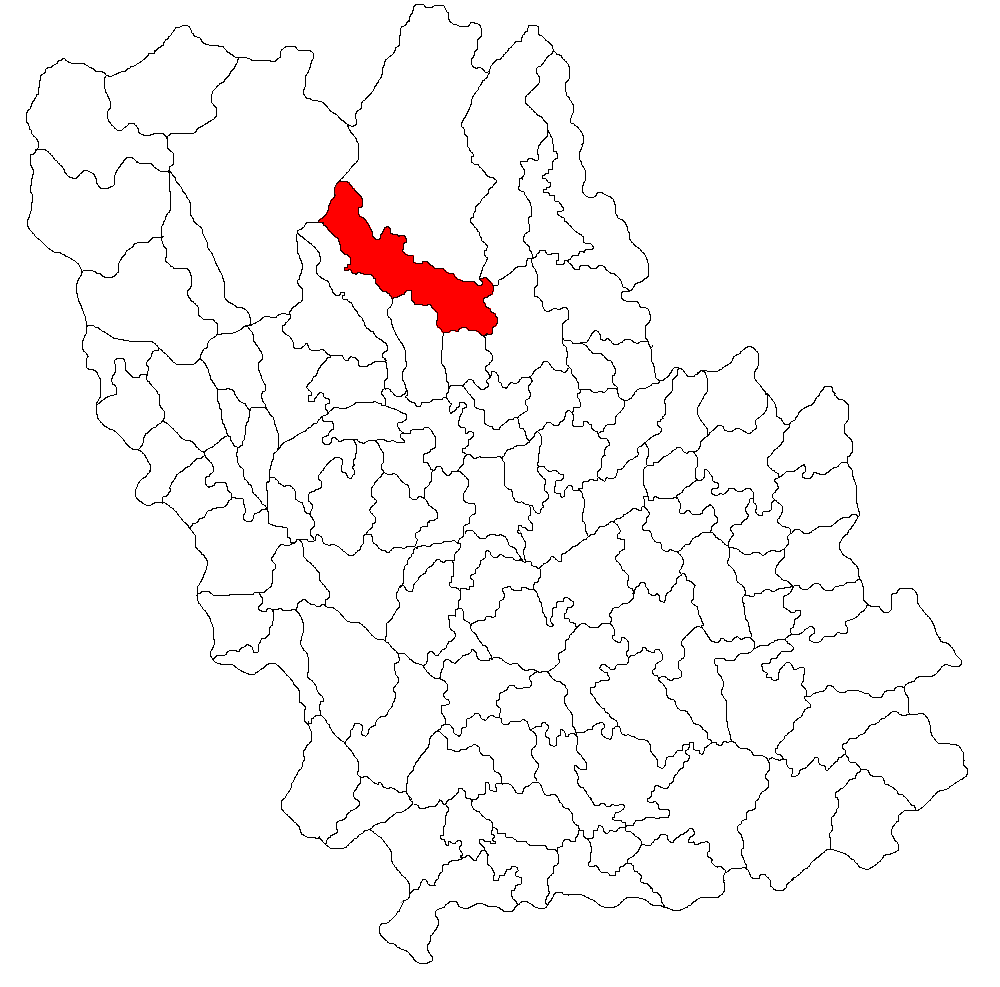
- Location in Prahova County

- Location in Romania
- Coordinates: 45°17′N 26°0′E
- Country: Romania
- County: Prahova

Government
  - Mayor (2024–2028): Ioan-Paul Grigore (PSD)
- Area: 75.01 km^{2} (28.96 sq mi)
- Elevation: 509 m (1,670 ft)
- Population (2021-12-01): 6,127
  - Density: 81.68/km^{2} (211.6/sq mi)
- Time zone: UTC+02:00 (EET)
  - Summer (DST): UTC+03:00 (EEST)
- Postal code: 107320
- Area code: +(40) 244
- Vehicle reg.: PH
- Website: www.izvoarele-ph.ro

Izvoarele is a commune in Prahova County, Muntenia, Romania. It is composed of six villages: Cernești, Chirițești, Homorâciu, Izvoarele, Malu Vânăt, and Schiulești.

A quiet, mostly self-sufficient commune, it has been slowly developing since the 1990s, with small improvements such as the mid-2000s paving of the main east/west road that had been a dirt road. Modern architecture is to be seen in some of the recently built houses, while some are very old, contrasting the mixed population of rich and poor. A railway bridge made of massive stone lies to the south of the railway station.

The river Teleajen flows through Homorâciu. The Crasna is a right tributary of this river; it discharges into the Teleajen in Izvoarele.

Historical population
Year	Pop.	±%
1992	7,100	—
2002	6,952	−2.1%
2011	6,577	−5.4%
2021	6,127	−6.8%
Source: Census data
