= Gropșoarele =

- Location within Romania

Location
- Country: Romania
- Counties: Prahova County

Physical characteristics
- Mouth: Teleajen
  - coordinates: 45.4536°N 25.9358°E
- Length: 7 km (4.3 mi)
- Basin size: 13 km^{2} (5.0 sq mi)

Basin features
- Progression: Teleajen→ Prahova→ Ialomița→ Danube→ Black Sea
- Tributaries
  - left: Gropșoarele Stână, Izvorul lui Cârstocea, Zăganu
  - right: Pârâul Fugarilor, Tâmpa

The Gropșoarele is a left tributary of the river Teleajen in Romania. It flows into the Teleajen in Cheia. Its length is 7 km (4.3 mi) and its basin size is 13 km^{2} (5.0 sq mi).
