= Irina Loghin =

Romanian singer and politician

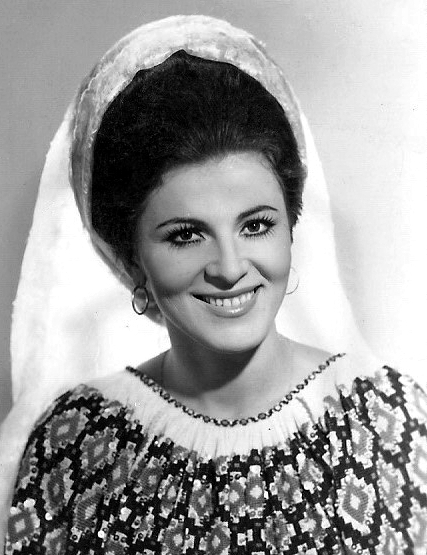
Irina Loghin

Irina Loghin (born February 19, 1939) is a Romanian singer and politician, known as the best-selling artist from her domain in Romania.

Born in Gura Vitioarei, Prahova County, she had a career as a folk music soloist. She made her radio debut in 1963, and in 1967, began a successful duo with Benone Sinulescu. She joined the Greater Romania Party in 1998, and in 2000, she was elected to the Chamber of Deputies for a Dolj County seat. In 2004, she was elected to the Senate for a Giurgiu County seat.

She and her husband Ion Cernea have a son and a daughter.

In 2015, the artist was chosen by Walt Disney Pictures to provide the Romanian voice of a witch in the animated movie The Black Cauldron.
