= Sofronie Vulpescu =

Romanian cleric and bishop

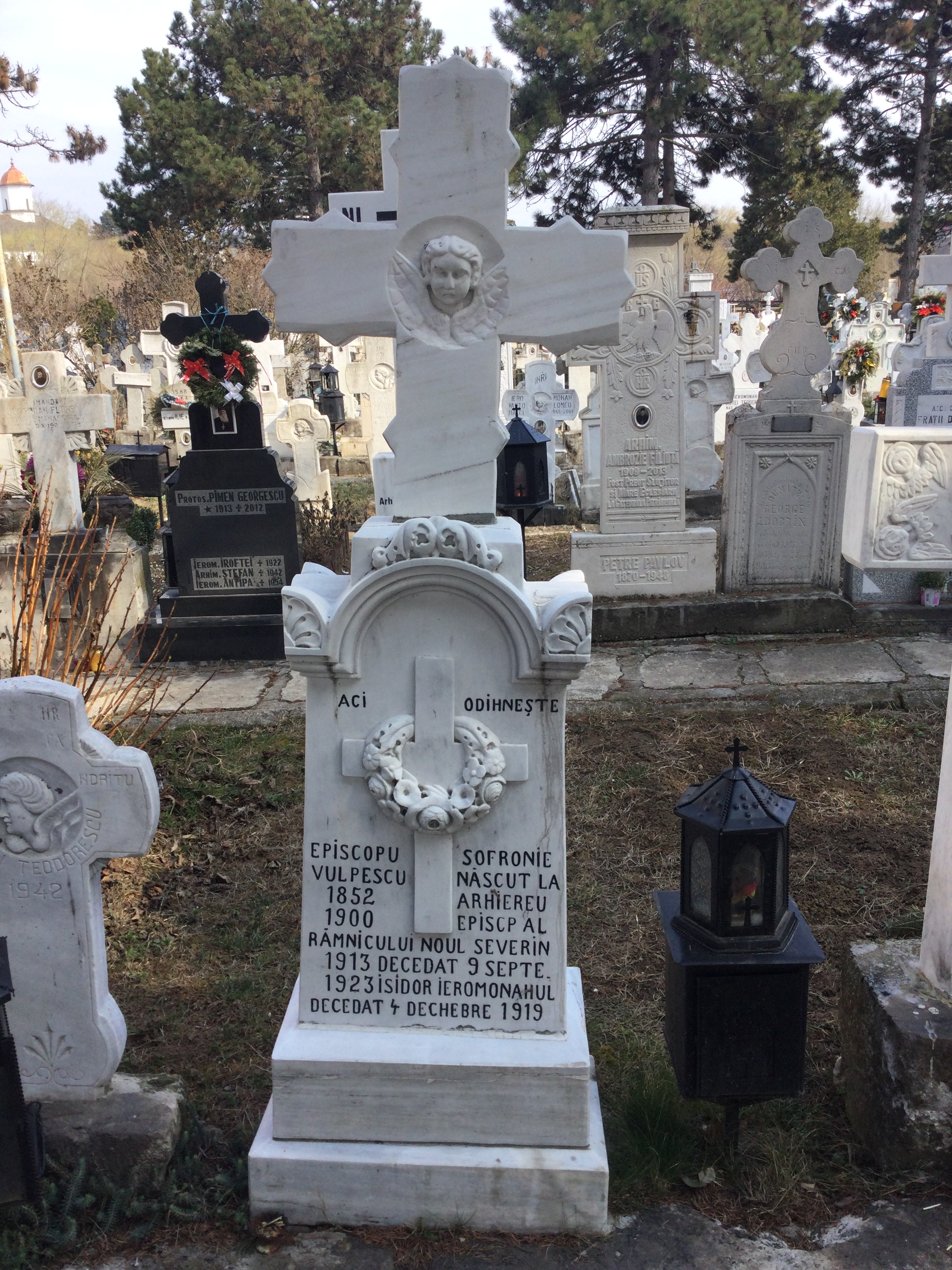
Grave at Cernica Monastery

Sofronie Vulpescu (Romanian pronunciation: [soˈfroni.e vulˈpesku]; born Ștefan Vulpescu [ʃteˈfan]; February 9, 1856 – September 6, 1923) was a Romanian cleric who became a bishop within the Romanian Orthodox Church.

Born in Lupșanu, Călărași County, he studied at the Nifon seminary in Bucharest from 1873 to 1877 before being ordained a priest in 1879 and assigned to his native village, serving there until 1890. After being left a widower, he took the advanced course of the central seminary (1890–1894) and studied at the theology faculty of the University of Bucharest (1894–1898). Meanwhile, he was a singer at Saint Spyridon the New Church (1890–1893) and a priest at the Romanian Metropolitan Cathedral (1893–1900). He became a monk in 1893, taking the name Sofronie. In May 1900, he was named vicar of the Râmnic Diocese in the Oltenia region; the same month, he was consecrated bishop, and used the title Craioveanul. Following the death of Ghenadie Georgescu in late 1912, he led the diocese on an interim basis. In May 1913, he was elected Georgescu's successor as Bishop of Râmnic, and was enthroned the next month.

In May 1917, during World War I, the German military authorities then occupying southern Romania placed him under house arrest at Cheia Monastery, followed by Ialomicioara and Căldărușani monasteries. In June 1918, following the Treaty of Bucharest, he presented his resignation to the Romanian authorities, who had retreated to Iași. When Oltenia had come under German occupation, Sofronie had neither gone to Iași nor stayed at his site, instead hoping to keep his position under the occupiers once the situation had settled down. His stance was rebuked both by the Germans, who arrested him and sent him away, and by Metropolitan Conon Arămescu-Donici, who in September 1917 wrote that starting the previous autumn, Sofronie was absent for several months without his permission and a regular leave of absence before being detained. In disgrace with the temporary authorities and accused by the metropolitan as well as the political leadership, resignation was his only viable option. He spent the rest of his life in Bucharest, and was buried at Cernica Monastery. During the Romanian authorities' flight to Iași, he was the victim of two notorious robbers who escaped from prison during the confusion, "Tata Moșu" and "Calapod". The pair stole his mitre, crosses, jewellery and some 15,000 lei, which they then divided. Part of the money was buried along with the mitre, after this was stripped of its precious stones.

Vulpescu was a target of particular vehemence from writer Tudor Arghezi, who in a 1913 article in Seara titled "Unghiile si sexul lui popa Iapă" ("The Fingernails and Sex of Father She-Goat") named him "His Most Porcine Excellence", "model pig of the Romanian Synod", "bishop louse" and "big bird". Later that year, Arghezi referred to the bishop as a "scabby and decayed he-goat", a worm emerged from pig feed, with a voice recalling the cries of the pig, skunk and hyena. The latter also received the appellation "three-way mongrel formed of a donkey, a mole cricket and a dog", a "mix of wild snouts and rotten meat", with a ram's hairdo and a goose's teary eyes. In Facla in 1911, Arghezi had already attacked Vulpescu as a risible mongrel, the offspring of a dog and a hen, both a shaggy dog-headed beast and a foolish egg-layer. He also alleged that the bishop was rabid, that he had a "stinking hand" and, being "foul-mouthed", had a double stench emanating from his mouth and his feet. Likening him to an outhouse due to the emanations from his mouth and his rectum, Arghezi accused Vulpescu of spitting into the mouths of altar boys, as though the "bishop's drool and mucus" were the Eucharist. The cleric was called "a big bird, recently raised out of a she-goat's roadside excrement", and said to deserve a gob of spit ten times the normal size. All sorts of repulsive material were said to come out of him: from the hair, "specks of mud, dandruff, bits of ground cereal"; mucus from the eyes, nasal material from the beard. Accused of being a sexual pervert and corruptor of minors, he was called "the libidinous bishop", with a "pornographic mouth". His corpulence and sexual appetite was said to give him female attributes, namely "massive tits and an open sex", while his nose was likened to a "soft testicle".
