= Bucov =

- Commune
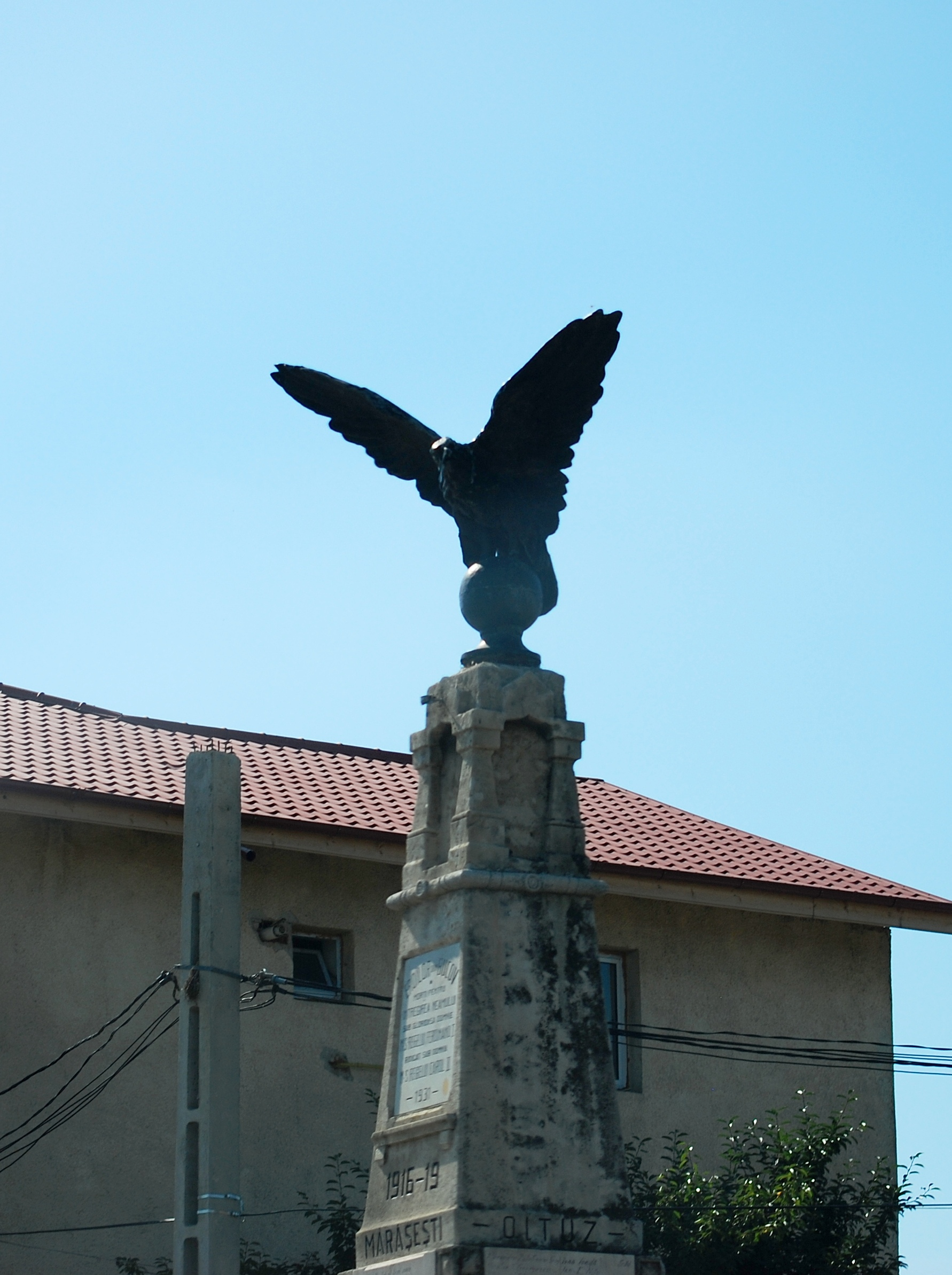
- Monument in Bucov

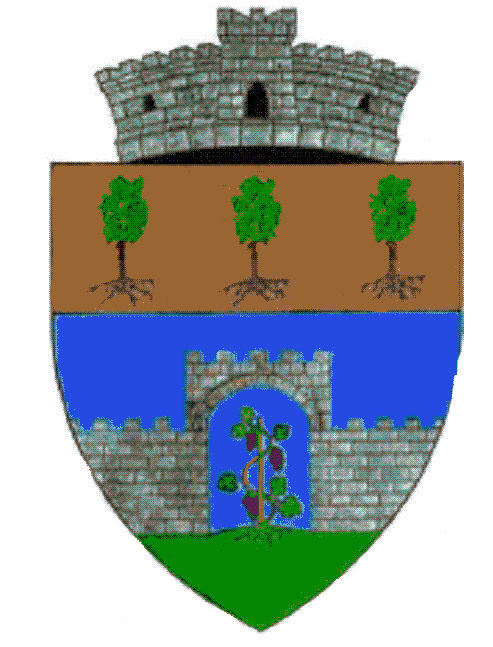
- Coat of arms

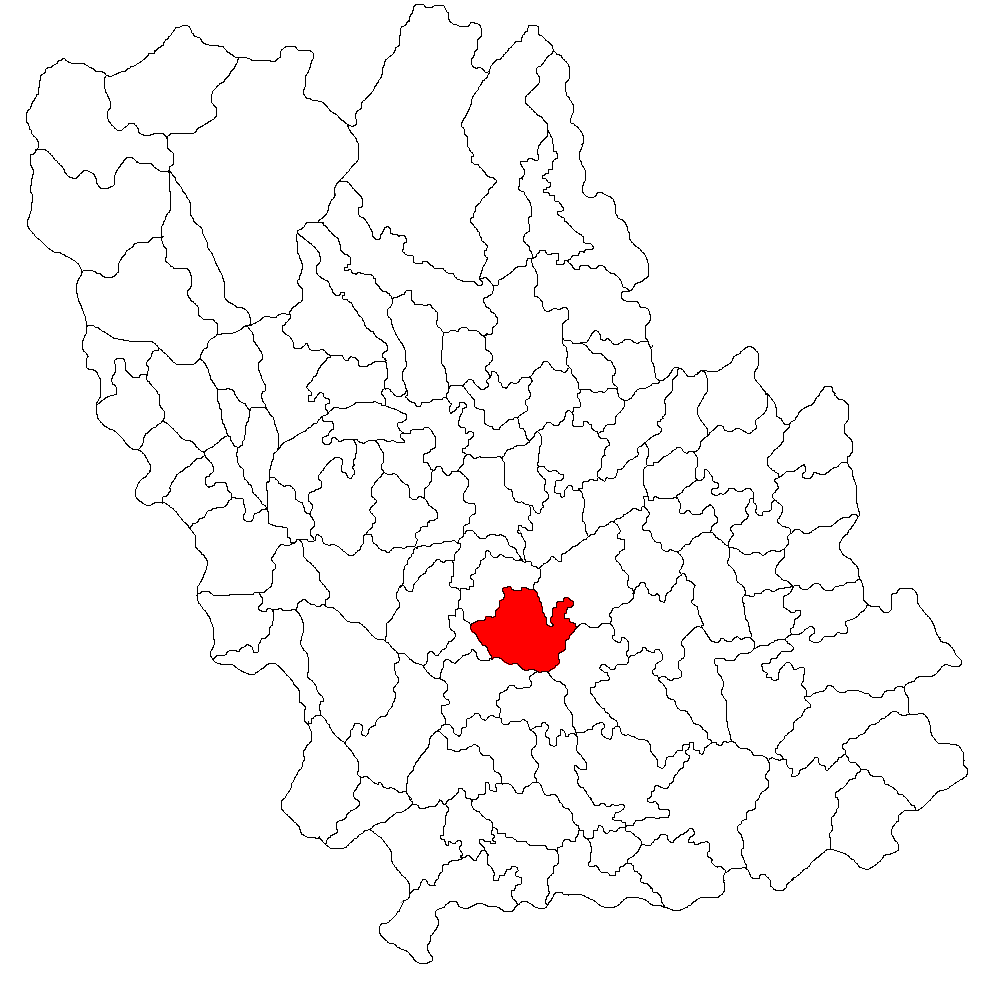
- Location in Prahova County

- Location in Romania
- Coordinates: 44°58′N 26°5′E
- Country: Romania
- County: Prahova

Government
  - Mayor (2020–2024): Ion Savu (PNL)
- Area: 49.03 km^{2} (18.93 sq mi)
- Elevation: 156 m (512 ft)
- Population (2021-12-01): 10,787
  - Density: 220.0/km^{2} (569.8/sq mi)
- Time zone: UTC+02:00 (EET)
  - Summer (DST): UTC+03:00 (EEST)
- Postal code: 107110
- Area code: +(40) 244
- Vehicle reg.: PH
- Website: www.primariabucov.ro

Bucov (Romanian pronunciation: [ˈbukov]) is a commune in Prahova County, Muntenia, Romania, just east of Ploiești, the county seat. It is composed of five villages: Bighilin, Bucov, Chițorani, Pleașa, and Valea Orlei.

The commune is located in the south-central part of the county. It is traversed by the DN1B road, which runs from Ploiești to Buzău.

The river Teleajen flows through the commune north to south, separating it from Ploiești. The Bucovel is a left tributary of the Teleajen; it discharges into the Iazul Morilor Teleajen in Bucov.

The Battle of Bucov (also: Bukowo) was fought here in 1600.

Historical population
Year	Pop.	±%
2002	10,448	—
2011	10,388	−0.6%
2021	10,787	+3.8%
Source: Census data
