= Louvigny, Calvados =

Louvigny
- Commune
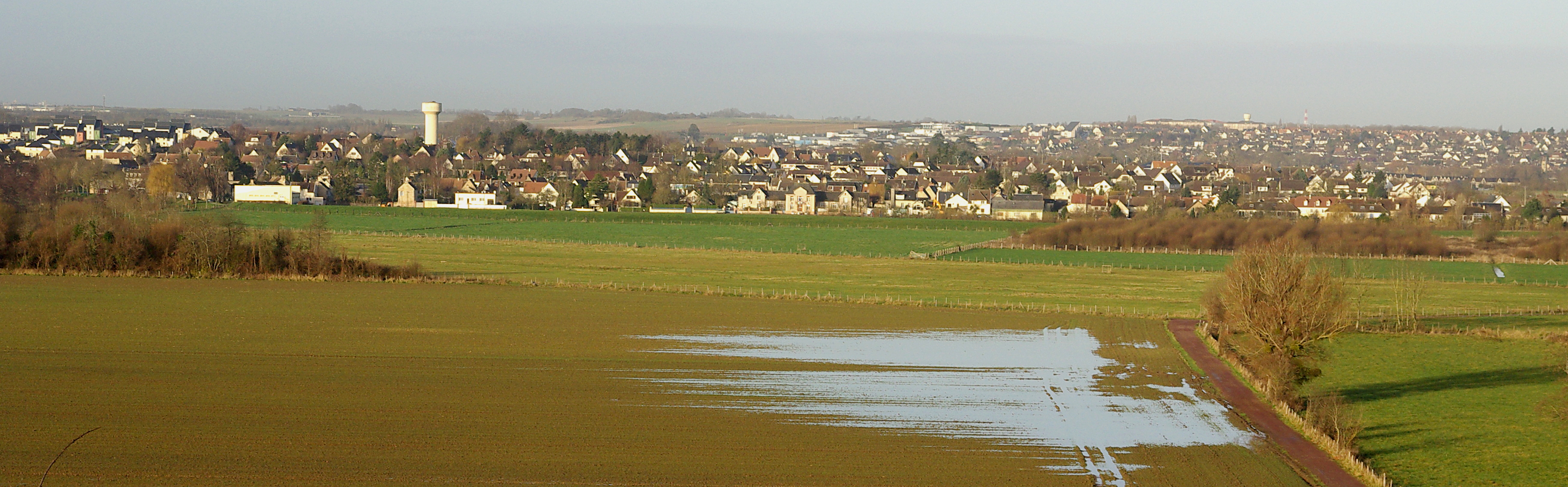
- A general view of Louvigny

- Coat of arms
- Location of Louvigny
- Location within France Location within Normandy
- Coordinates: 49°09′31″N 0°23′27″W
- Country: France
- Region: Normandy
- Department: Calvados
- Arrondissement: Caen
- Canton: Caen-5
- Intercommunality: CU Caen la Mer

Government
  - Mayor (2020–2026): Patrick Ledoux
- Area^{1}: 5.64 km^{2} (2.18 sq mi)
- Elevation: 7 m (23 ft)
- Highest elevation: 48 m (157 ft)
- Lowest elevation: 2 m (6.6 ft)
- Population (2023): 2,612
  - Density: 463/km^{2} (1,200/sq mi)
- Time zone: UTC+01:00 (CET)
  - Summer (DST): UTC+02:00 (CEST)
- INSEE/Postal code: 14383 /14111
- ^{1} French Land Register data, which excludes lakes, ponds, glaciers > 1 km^{2} (0.386 sq mi or 247 acres) and river estuaries.

Louvigny (French pronunciation: [luviɲi]) is a commune in the Calvados department in the Normandy region in northwestern France.

== Geography ==
The commune is made up of the following collection of villages and hamlets, Athis and Louvigny.

Two rivers the Orne and one of its tributaries the Odon a flow through the commune.

== Population ==
Historical population

Year	Pop.	±% p.a.
1793	455	—
1800	434	−0.67%
1806	539	+3.68%
1821	543	+0.05%
1831	608	+1.14%
1836	640	+1.03%
1841	672	+0.98%
1846	648	−0.72%
1851	581	−2.16%
1856	564	−0.59%
1861	564	+0.00%
1866	543	−0.76%
1872	518	−0.78%
1876	509	−0.44%
1881	466	−1.75%
1886	491	+1.05%
1891	511	+0.80%
1896	491	−0.80%
1901	450	−1.73%

Year	Pop.	±% p.a.
1906	462	+0.53%
1911	481	+0.81%
1921	531	+0.99%
1926	552	+0.78%
1931	574	+0.78%
1936	575	+0.03%
1946	610	+0.59%
1954	726	+2.20%
1962	771	+0.75%
1968	951	+3.56%
1975	1,252	+4.01%
1982	1,384	+1.44%
1990	1,712	+2.69%
1999	1,766	+0.35%
2007	2,597	+4.94%
2012	2,719	+0.92%
2017	2,742	+0.17%
2023	2,612	−0.81%

Source: EHESS and INSEE (1968-2023)

== Points of interest ==
=== National Heritage Sites ===
The commune has three sites listed as a Monument historique.

- Eglise Saint-Vigor a fourteenth-century church listed as monuments in 1927.
- Château de Louvigny an eighteenth-century chateau listed as a monument in 1946.
- Gate a seventeenth-century gate listed as a monument in 1928.

== Sport ==
The commune has a 6 hole golf course since 2011, the Golf Compact de Louvigny.

== Twin towns – sister cities ==
Louvigny is twinned with:

- Feniton, England. Since 1976
- Zellingen, Germany. Since 1984
- Bertea, Romania. Since 1998
- Colceresa, Italy. Since 2001

== Local names ==
- Lovigky (Louvignian)
- Lokilia (Calvado Language)

== See also ==
- Communes of the Calvados department
