= Maria Grapini =

Romanian politician (born 1954)

Maria Grapini MEP
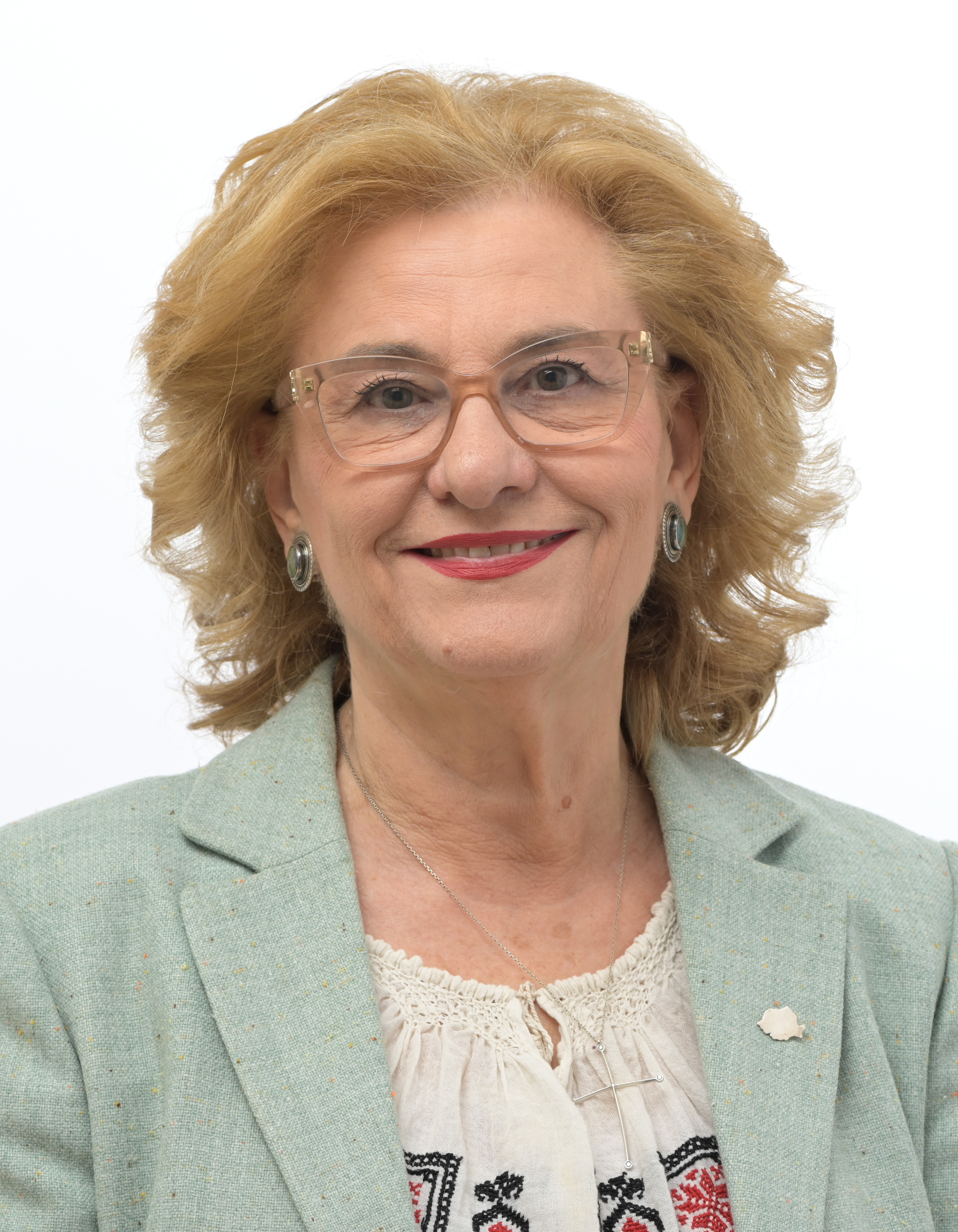
- Official portrait, 2024

Member of the European Parliament for Romania
- Incumbent
- Assumed office 1 July 2014

Romanian Minister of Small and Medium Enterprises, Commerce and Business Environment
- In office 21 December 2012 – 5 March 2014
- President: Traian Băsescu
- Prime Minister: Victor Ponta

Member of the Chamber of Deputies
- In office December 2012 – 25 March 2014
- Succeeded by: Florică Bîrsășteanu

Personal details
- Born: 7 November 1954 (age 71) Berești, Romania
- Party: PPU (2020–present)
- Other political affiliations: PC (2006–2015); PPU (2015–2019); PSD (2019–2020)
- Education: Gheorghe Asachi Technical University of Iași
- Occupation: Politician
- Profession: Businesswoman, textile engineer

Maria Grapini (born 7 November 1954) is a Romanian businesswoman and politician. She served as the Deputy Minister in the Second Ponta cabinet. Since 2014, Grapini has been a Member of the European Parliament for the Progressive Alliance of Socialists and Democrats.

== Early life and education ==
Grapini was born on 7 November 1954 in Berești, Galați County. She graduated from the Berești Theoretical High School in 1973 and the Gheorghe Asachi Technical University of Iași in 1978.

== Career ==
Grapini held various positions at the Garofița Textile Enterprise in Timișoara until 1989. Between 1995 and 2012, she was the president of the Council of Administration and general manager of Pasmatex. She also served as the president of the Council of Administration of SC Pasmatex Conf International SA from 1998 to 2012.

Grapini was the president of both the Women Entrepreneurs Association of Romania and the Light Industry Employers Federation. She was a member of the National Council of Exporters and Honorary Consul of India in Romania.

== Political activity ==
Between 2006 and 2015, Grapini was the vice president of the Conservative Party (PC). In June 2015, Grapini announced her resignation from the party. She accused PC President Daniel Constantin of seizing the party and being responsible for its disappearance following the decision of unifying it with the Liberal Reformist Party. A month later, Grapini joined the Humanist Power Party.

In 2012, Grapini was elected as the deputy of the 37th constituency at Timiș County. On 19 December 2012, she was appointed as the Minister for Small and Medium-Sized Enterprises, Business and Tourism Environment in the Second Ponta cabinet.

=== Member of the European Parliament, 2014–present ===
In January 2014, the PC announced Grapini's resignation from the position due to her candidacy in the 2014 European Parliament election. She later resigned from Parliament for the same reason.

In the election, the PC ran candidates on common lists with the PSD and UNPR; Grapini was the fifth candidate. The alliance won with 37.6% of the votes, and Grapini was elected.

Grapini was re-elected at the 2019 European Parliament election in Romania. Although not officially registered with the party, Grapini was the sixth candidate on the PSD list.

In addition to her committee assignments, Grapini is part of the European Parliament Intergroup on Small and Medium-Sized Enterprises (SMEs).

== Published works ==
Grapini has published four books. The first was published in 2011 and contains interviews that Grapini had over time at Radio Timișoara. In 2012, she published a novel, Viața, între scrieri și trans-scrieri, which contained a critical presentation signed by Cornel Ungureanu. In an investigation published by Recorder, journalist Mihai Voinea showed that the novel contained several fragments copied from Wikipedia.

== Criticism ==
Grapini has attracted media criticism due to her frequent spelling and punctuation mistakes in her Facebook account. In July 2015, a website named Grapinizer was launched, allowing users to convert grammatically correct Romanian language text into her writing style: "[it] adds redundant commas, changes the order of letters within words, and removes blanks spaces after punctuation marks."

In August 2018, Grapini appealed to the National Council for Combating Discrimination due to a Facebook message. In the message, she offended the Romanian diaspora at an anti-government rally in the Victory Square, saying they had to "pay dumb taxes for the USR". Later, Grapini said she disagreed with the statement and explained why she distributed the message:

I distributed to see that not all of the diaspora has the same point of view. A diaspora lady posted this. I posted one single time, without making any comments. My message is that no one can pretend to represent the entire diaspora.

== Recognition ==
In 2019, Grapini was the recipient of the Internal Market & Consumer Protection Award at the annual MEP Awards of The Parliament Magazine.
