= Dâmbu (river) =

- Location within Romania

Location
- Country: Romania
- Counties: Prahova County

Physical characteristics
- Mouth: Teleajen
  - location: Buchilași
  - coordinates: 44.8676°N 26.1517°E
- Length: 39 km (24 mi)
- Basin size: 190 km^{2} (73 sq mi)

Basin features
- Progression: Teleajen→ Prahova→ Ialomița→ Danube→ Black Sea

The Dâmbu is a right tributary of the river Teleajen in Romania. It flows through the city Ploiești and the villages Băicoi, Păulești, Corlătești and Goga. It discharges into the Teleajen in Buchilași. Its length is 39 km (24 mi) and its basin size is 190 km^{2} (73 sq mi).
