= Bucovel =

- Location within Romania

Location
- Country: Romania
- Counties: Prahova County
- Villages: Plopu, Chițorani

Physical characteristics
- Mouth: Teleajen
  - location: Bucov
  - coordinates: 44.9553°N 26.1032°E
- Length: 25 km (16 mi)
- Basin size: 102 km^{2} (39 sq mi)

Basin features
- Progression: Teleajen→ Prahova→ Ialomița→ Danube→ Black Sea

The Bucovel (Romanian pronunciation: [bukoˈvel]) is a left tributary of the river Teleajen in Romania. It discharges into the Iazul Morilor Teleajen, which is connected to the Teleajen, in Bucov. Its length is 25 km (16 mi) and its basin size is 102 km^{2} (39 sq mi).
