= Gura Vitioarei =

- Commune
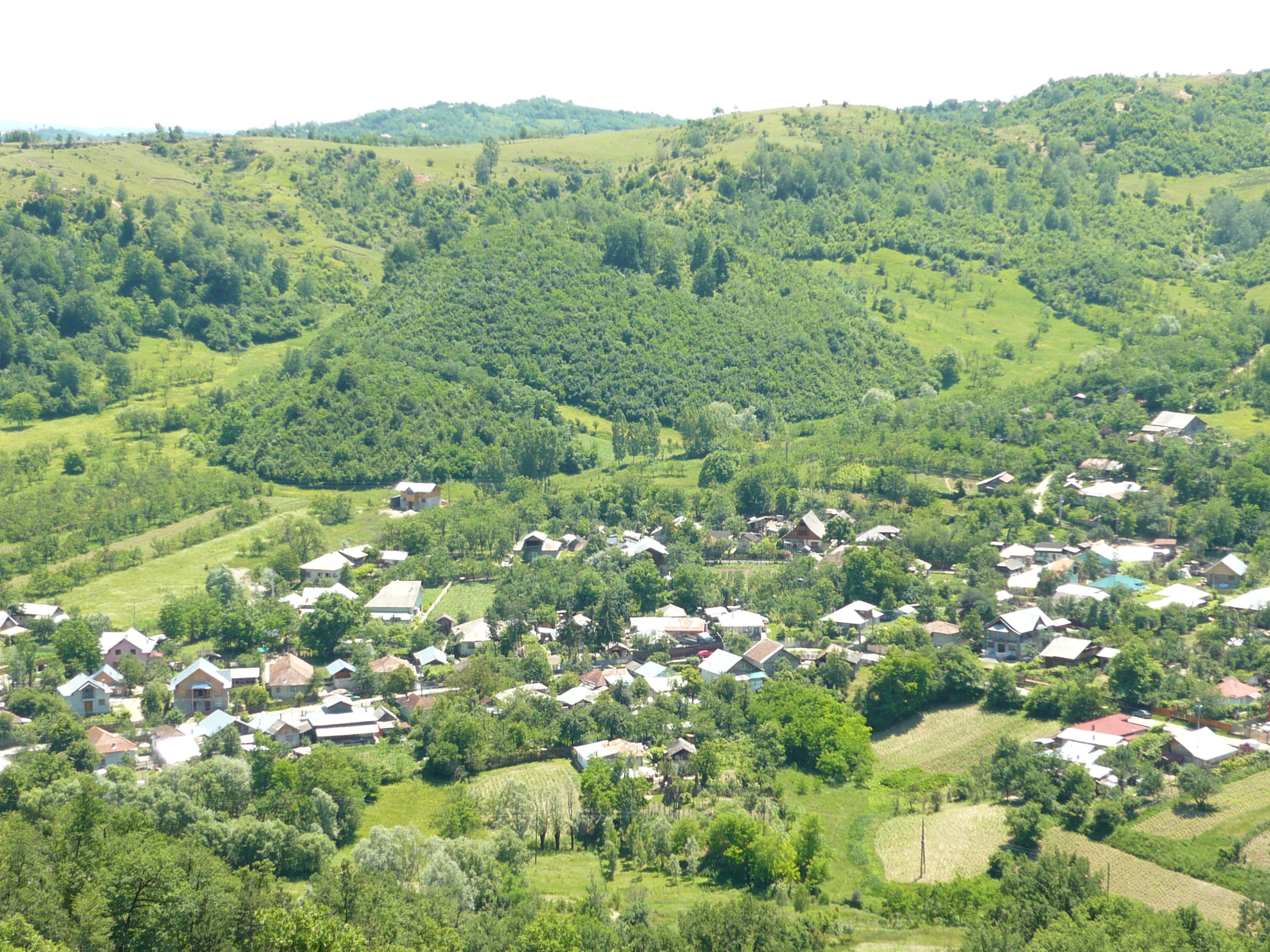
- Panoramic view of Poiana Copăceni village

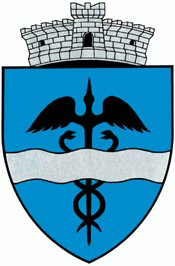
- Coat of arms

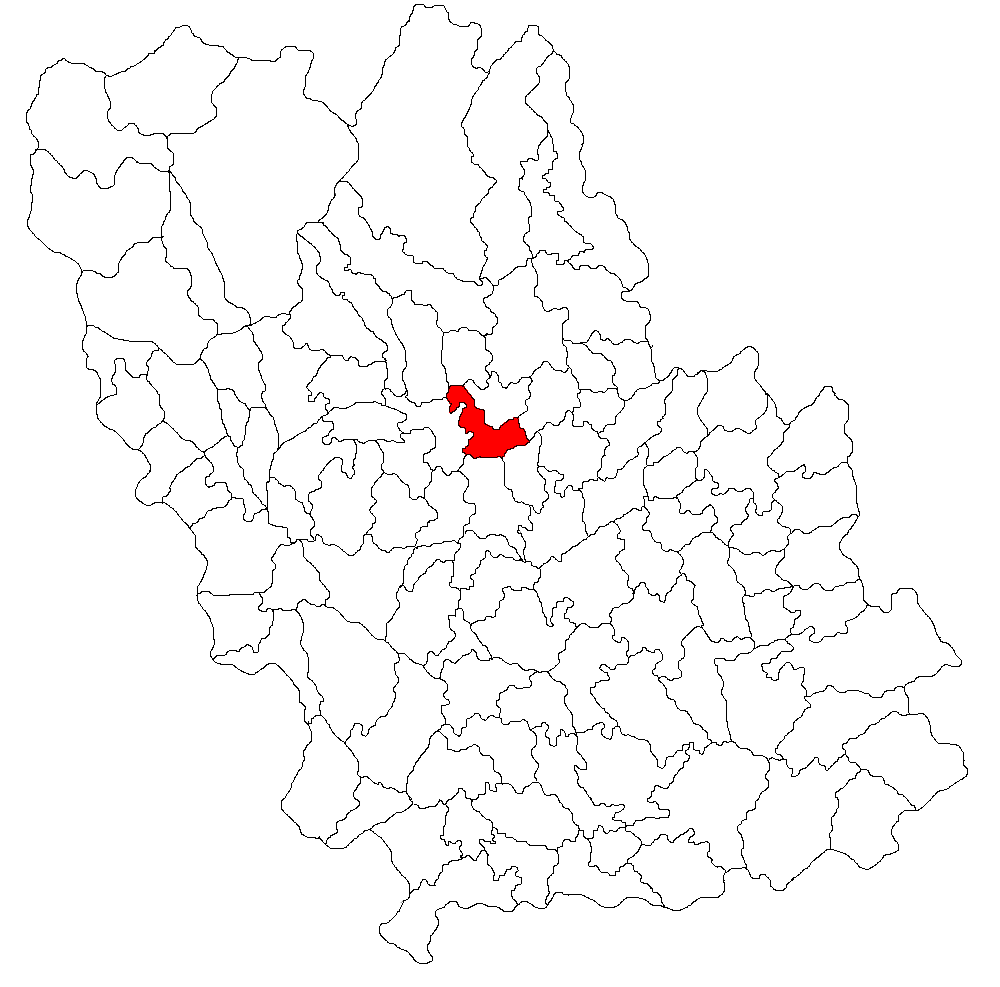
- Location in Prahova County

- Location in Romania
- Coordinates: 45°9′N 26°2′E
- Country: Romania
- County: Prahova

Government
  - Mayor (2020–2024): Gheorghe Stănescu (PNL)
- Area: 33 km^{2} (13 sq mi)
- Elevation: 305 m (1,001 ft)
- Population (2021-12-01): 5,571
  - Density: 170/km^{2} (440/sq mi)
- Time zone: UTC+02:00 (EET)
  - Summer (DST): UTC+03:00 (EEST)
- Postal code: 107305
- Area code: +(40) 244
- Vehicle reg.: PH
- Website: www.guravitioarei.ro

Gura Vitioarei is a commune in Prahova County, Muntenia, Romania. It is composed of five villages: Bughea de Jos, Făgetu, Fundeni, Gura Vitioarei, and Poiana Copăceni.

The commune is located in the north-central part of the county, in the sub-Carpathian area of the Teleajen River valley. It is crossed by the national road DN1A, which connects Ploiești and Brașov; it lies 26.1 km (16.2 mi) north the county seat, Ploiești, and 5.3 km (3.3 mi) south of the town of Vălenii de Munte. The Ploiești Sud–Măneciu railway also passes through the commune, which is served by the Făget Teleajen stop.

Historical population
Year	Pop.	±%
1992	6,077	—
2002	6,061	−0.3%
2011	6,003	−1.0%
2021	5,571	−7.2%
Source: Census data

== Natives ==
- Irina Loghin (born 1939), singer and politician
