= Teleajen =

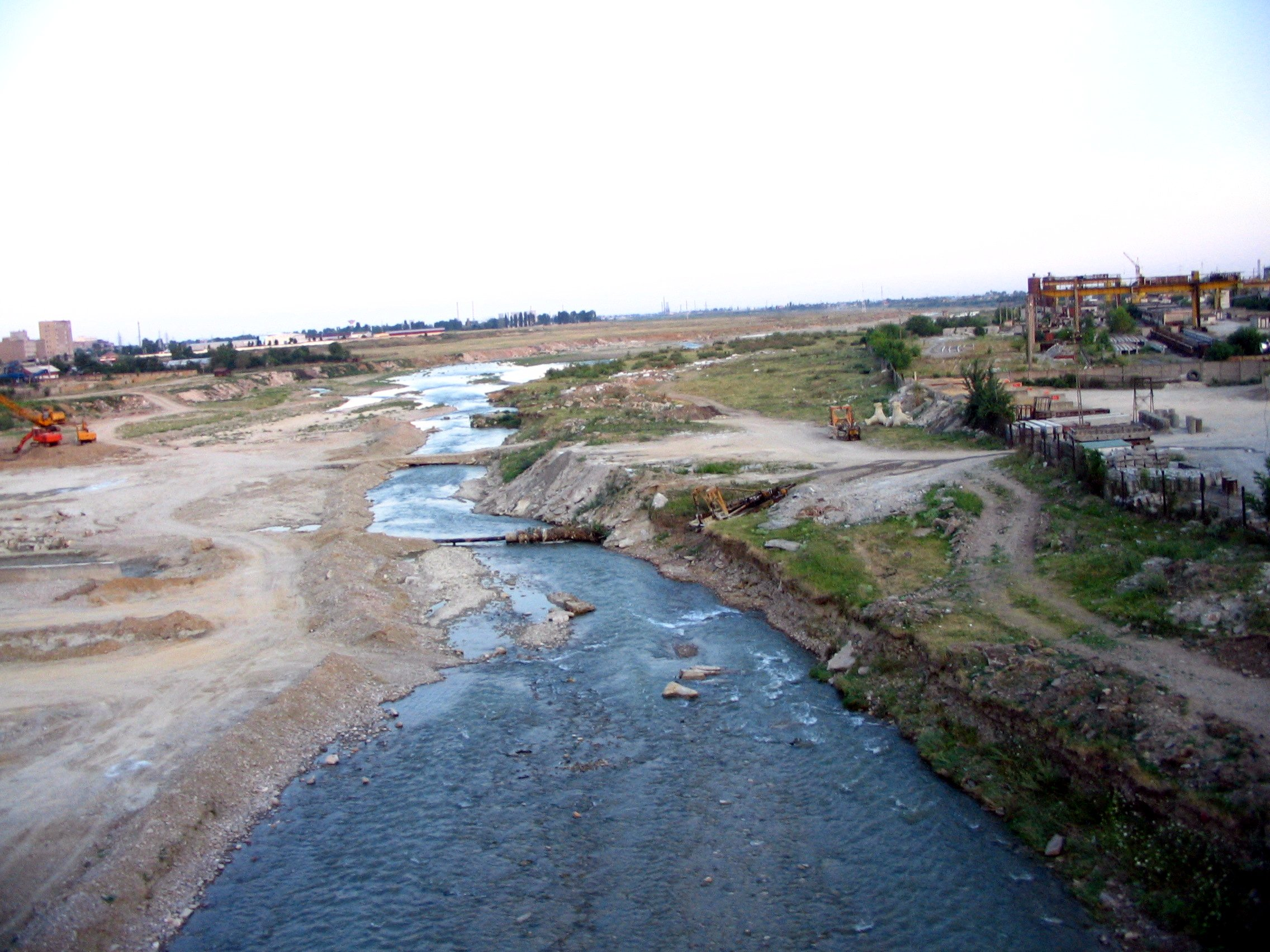
- Teleajen near Ploiești

- Location within Romania

Location
- Country: Romania
- Counties: Prahova County
- Towns: Vălenii de Munte

Physical characteristics
- Source: Ciucaș Mountains near Cheia
  - elevation: 1,754 m (5,755 ft)
- Mouth: Prahova
  - location: near Palanca
  - coordinates: 44°48′43″N 26°13′03″E
- Length: 122 km (76 mi)
- Basin size: 1,656 km^{2} (639 sq mi)

Basin features
- Progression: Prahova→ Ialomița→ Danube→ Black Sea

The Teleajen is a left tributary of the river Prahova in southern Romania. Its source is at 1,754 m (5,755 ft) elevation in the Ciucaș Mountains, north of Roșu Peak and the locality of Cheia. Upstream from its confluence with the Gropșoarele in Cheia, it is also called Berea or Cheița. It flows through the Cheia hollow, by the towns of Vălenii de Munte and Boldești-Scăeni and the city of Ploiești. It discharges into the Prahova near Palanca. Its length is 122 km (76 mi) and its basin size is 1,656 km^{2} (639 sq mi).

== Towns and villages ==
The following towns and villages are situated along the river Teleajen, from source to mouth: Cheia, Măneciu, Homorâciu, Vălenii de Munte, Gura Vitioarei, Plopeni, Bucov, Dumbrava.

== Tributaries ==
The following rivers are tributaries to the river Teleajen (from source to mouth):

- Left: Pârâul Roșu, Pârâul Cucului, Gropșoarele, Pridvara, Brădetul, Pârâul lui Iepure, Pleșu, Valea Monteorului, Telejenel, Drajna, Gura Vitioarei, Bucovel
- Right: Tigăile, Izvorul lui Manole, Bratocea, Babeș, Ciobu, Valea Neagră, Giumelnicu, Mogoșu, Stâna, Bobu, Carpen, Valea Popii, Valea Brusturei, Valea Orății, Valea Movilișului, Boulețu, Valea Mare, Crasna, Stâlpul, Bughea, Vărbilău, Telega, Dâmbu, Ghighiu, Pârâul Rece, Șoava, Leaotul
