= Surani, Prahova =

Surani
- Commune
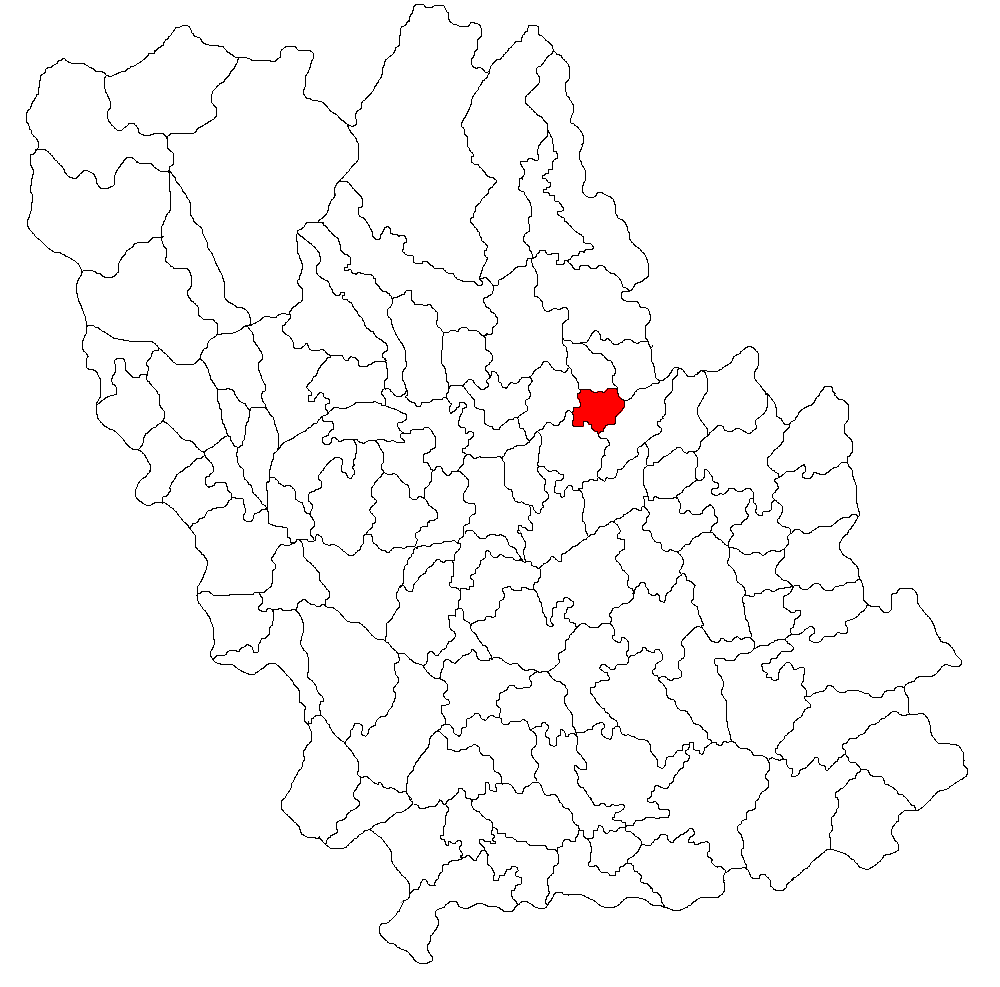
- Location in Prahova County

- Location in Romania
- Coordinates: 45°12′N 26°12′E
- Country: Romania
- County: Prahova

Government
  - Mayor (2024–2028): Lucian-Gabriel Bucur (PNL)
- Area: 15.95 km^{2} (6.16 sq mi)
- Elevation: 274 m (899 ft)
- Population (2021-12-01): 1,635
  - Density: 100/km^{2} (270/sq mi)
- Time zone: EET/EEST (UTC+2/+3)
- Postal code: 107545
- Area code: +(40) 244
- Vehicle reg.: PH
- Website: primariasurani.ro

Surani is a commune in Prahova County, Muntenia, Romania. It is composed of two villages, Păcuri and Surani.

Historical population
Year	Pop.	±%
2002	1,868	—
2011	1,655	−11.4%
2021	1,635	−1.2%
Source: Census data
