= Teișani =

- Commune
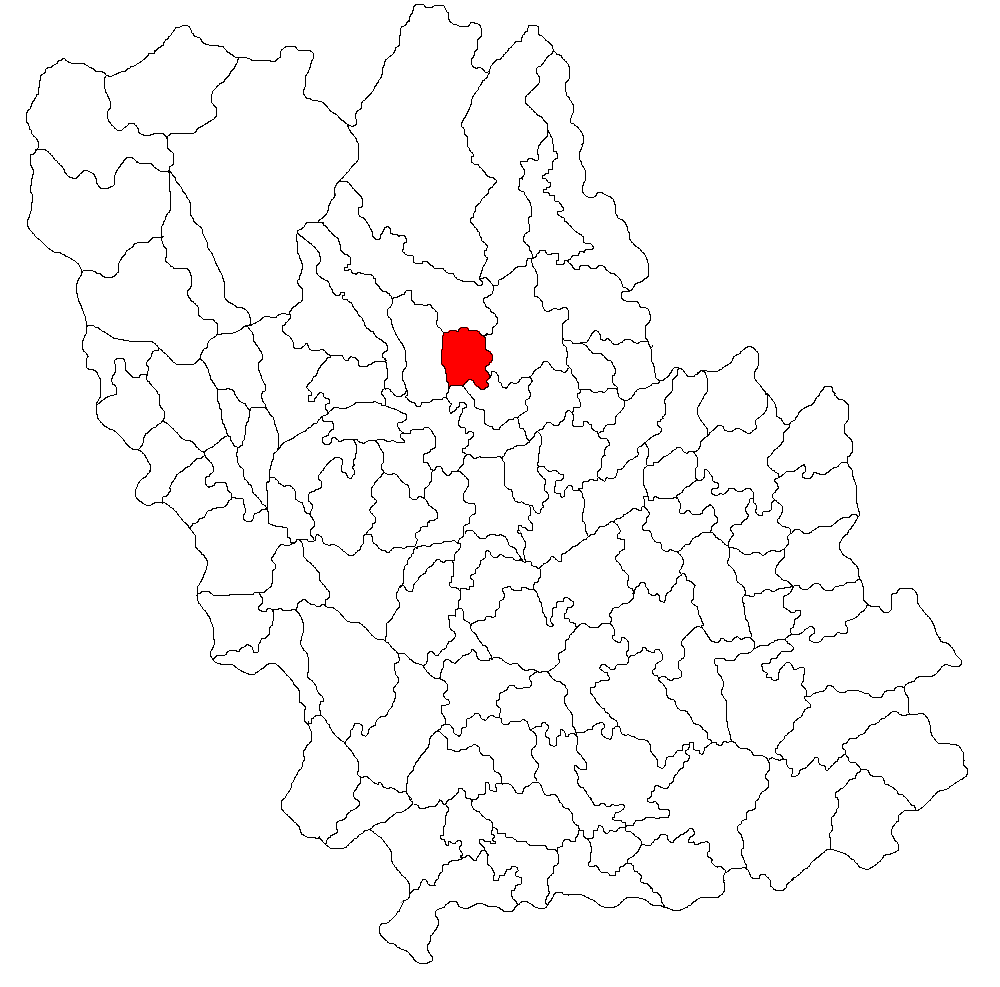
- Location in Prahova County

- Location in Romania
- Coordinates: 45.2352°N 26.013°E
- Country: Romania
- County: Prahova

Government
  - Mayor (2024–2028): Gheorghe Stanciu (PNL)
- Area: 29.28 km^{2} (11.31 sq mi)
- Elevation: 513 m (1,683 ft)
- Population (2021-12-01): 3,343
  - Density: 110/km^{2} (300/sq mi)
- Time zone: EET/EEST (UTC+2/+3)
- Postal code: 107595
- Area code: +(40) 244
- Vehicle reg.: PH
- Website: teisani.europrahova.eu

Teișani is a commune in Prahova County, Muntenia, Romania. It is composed of five villages: Bughea de Sus, Olteni, Ștubeiu, Teișani, and Valea Stâlpului.

Historical population
Year	Pop.	±%
1992	4,056	—
2002	4,035	−0.5%
2011	3,565	−11.6%
2021	3,343	−6.2%
Source: Census data
