= Cheia =

Mountain resort in Prahova County, Romania

Coordinates: 45°27′17″N 25°56′12″E

Cheia is a mountain resort, 60 kilometres (37 mi) north of Ploiești in Prahova County, Romania. Situated in the Teleajen Valley, it is surrounded by the Ciucaș Mountains. Administratively, Cheia is a village, part of Măneciu commune. Cheia Monastery is located to the southeast of the town.

== Mountain peaks ==
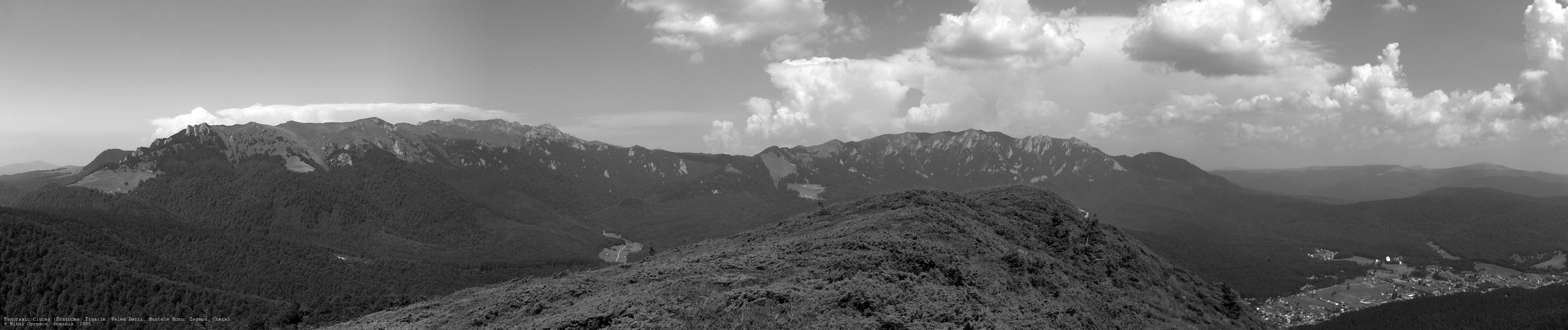
Cheia – panorama

Heights, as shown in the panoramic photo (from left to right, view from the Babeș Peak):

- Bratocea Pass (1,263 m)
- Tesla Peak (1,613 m)
- Ciucaș Peak (1,954 m)
- Valea Berii
- Muntele Roșu (the Red Mountain)
- Gropșoare Peak (1,833 m)
- Zăganu Peak (1,817 m)
- Cheia resort (875 m).

== Water source ==
Cheia in Prahova is the source for several brands of bottled mineral water in Romania, including Keia Izvorul Zaganului Junior.
