= Bertea =

- Commune
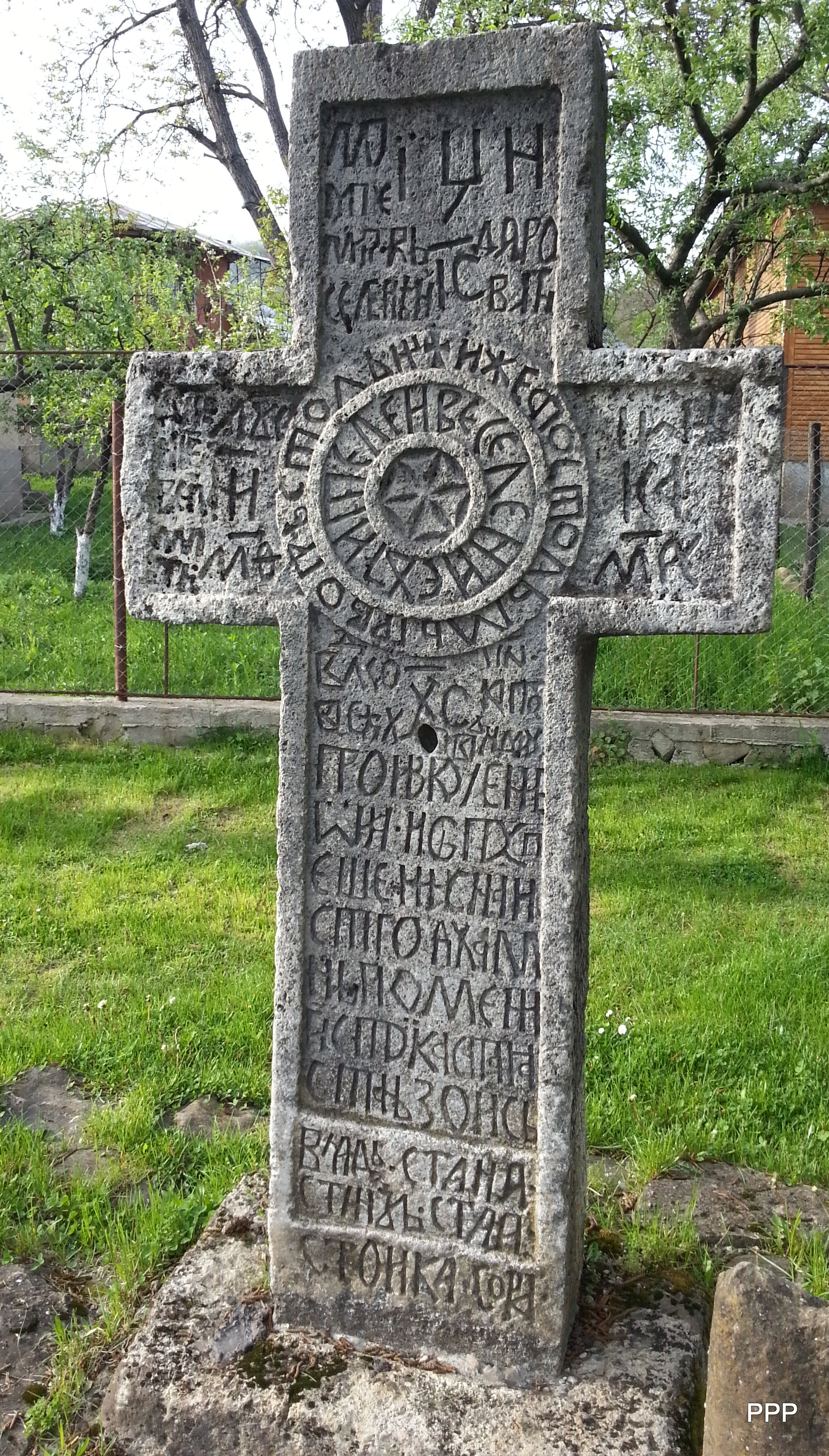
- Stone cross in Bertea village (1598)

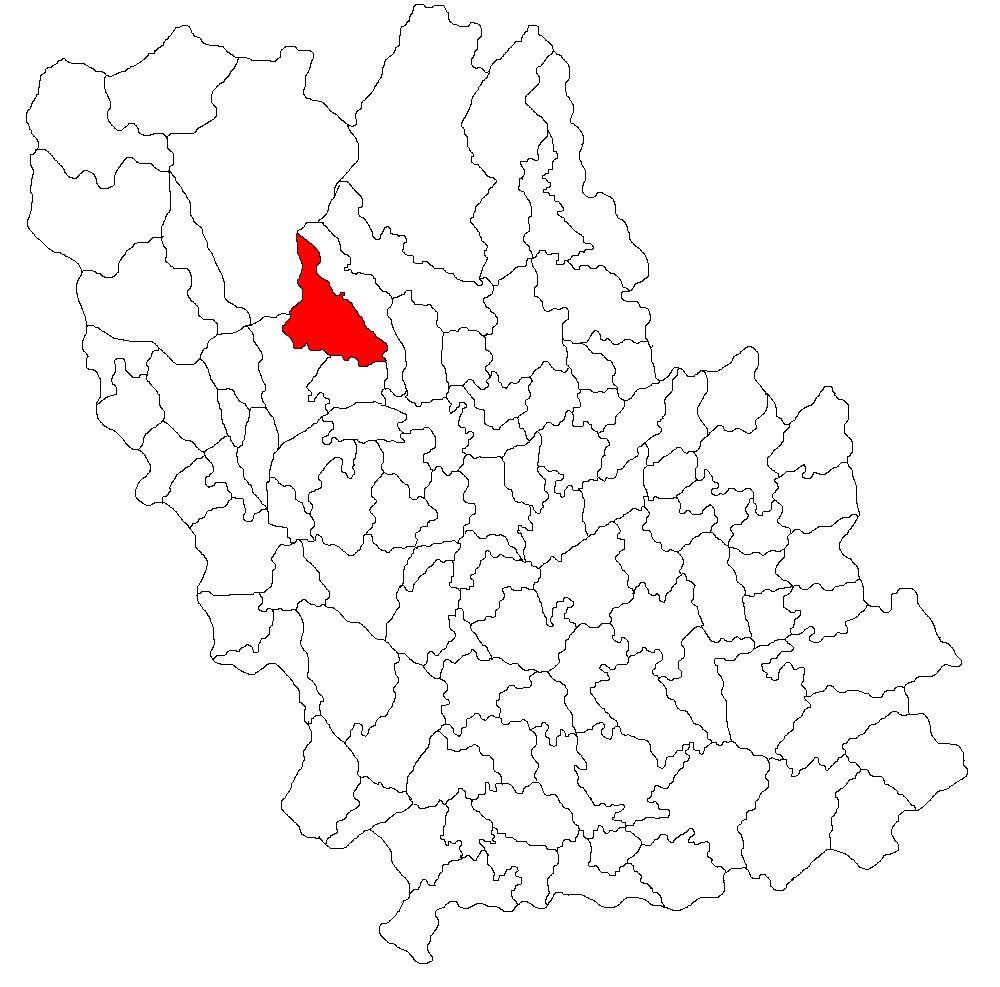
- Location in Prahova County

- Location in Romania
- Coordinates: 45°14′N 25°52′E
- Country: Romania
- County: Prahova

Government
  - Mayor (2024–2028): Aurelian Boghici (PNL)
- Area: 34.6 km^{2} (13.4 sq mi)
- Elevation: 486 m (1,594 ft)
- Population (2021-12-01): 2,701
  - Density: 78.1/km^{2} (202/sq mi)
- Time zone: UTC+02:00 (EET)
  - Summer (DST): UTC+03:00 (EEST)
- Postal code: 107065
- Area code: +(40) 244
- Vehicle reg.: PH
- Website: www.comunabertea.ro

Bertea is a commune in Prahova County, Muntenia, Romania. It is composed of two villages, Bertea and Lutu Roșu.

Historical population
Year	Pop.	±%
1992	3,533	—
2002	3,442	−2.6%
2011	3,239	−5.9%
2021	2,701	−16.6%
Source: Census data

== Twin towns – sister cities ==
Bertea is twinned with:

- Louvigny, France. Since 1998
