= Râfov =

- Commune
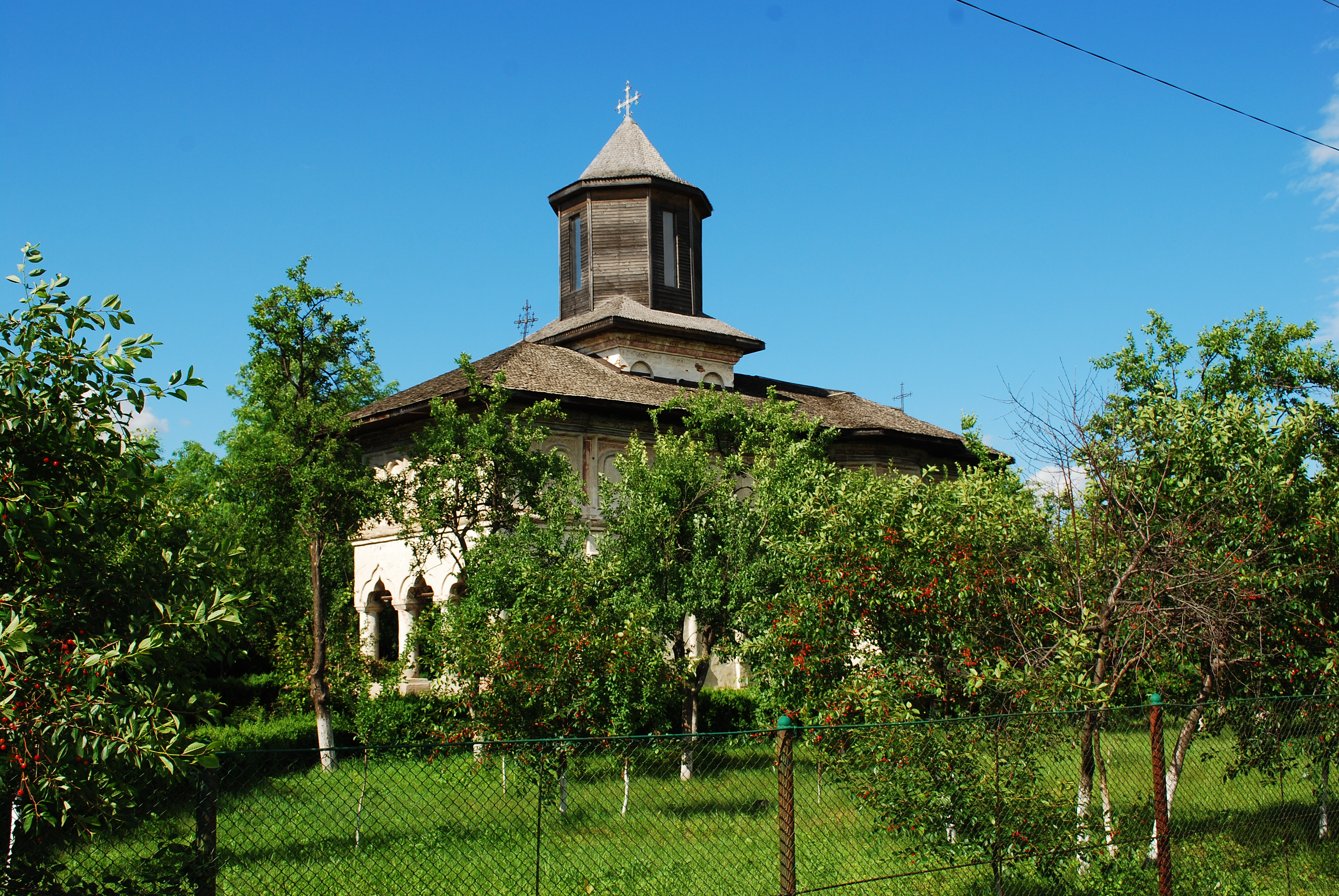
- Saint Nicholas Church in Râfov

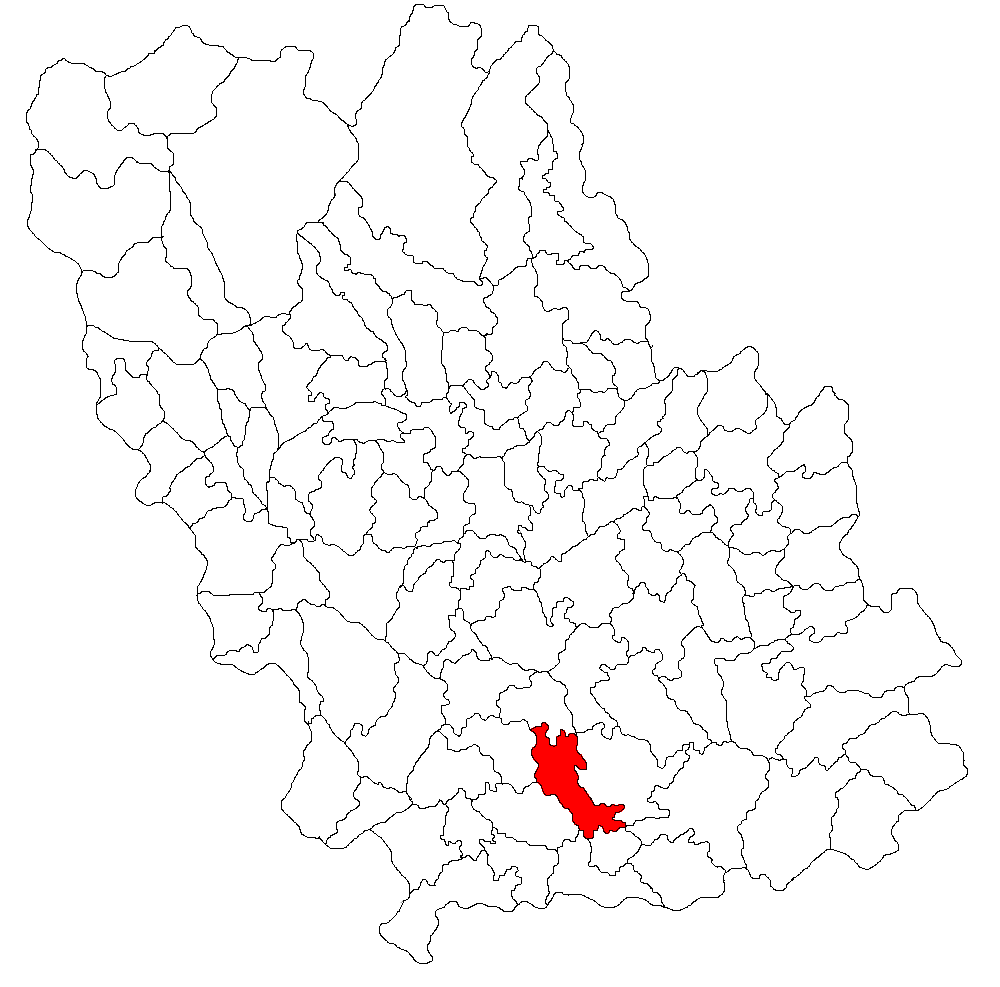
- Location in Prahova County

- Location in Romania
- Coordinates: 44°52′N 26°8′E
- Country: Romania
- County: Prahova

Government
  - Mayor (2024–2028): Paul-Costin Cazanciuc (PSD)
- Area: 27.68 km^{2} (10.69 sq mi)
- Elevation: 103 m (338 ft)
- Population (2021-12-01): 5,213
  - Density: 188.3/km^{2} (487.8/sq mi)
- Time zone: UTC+02:00 (EET)
  - Summer (DST): UTC+03:00 (EEST)
- Postal code: 107495
- Area code: +(40) 244
- Vehicle reg.: PH
- Website: primariarifov.ro

Râfov is a commune in Prahova County, Muntenia, Romania. It is composed of nine villages: Antofiloaia, Buchilași, Buda, Goga, Mălăiești, Moara Domnească, Palanca, Râfov, and Sicrita.

Historical population
Year	Pop.	±%
1992	5,695	—
2002	5,589	−1.9%
2011	5,297	−5.2%
2021	5,213	−1.6%
Source: Census data
