= Măneciu =

- Commune
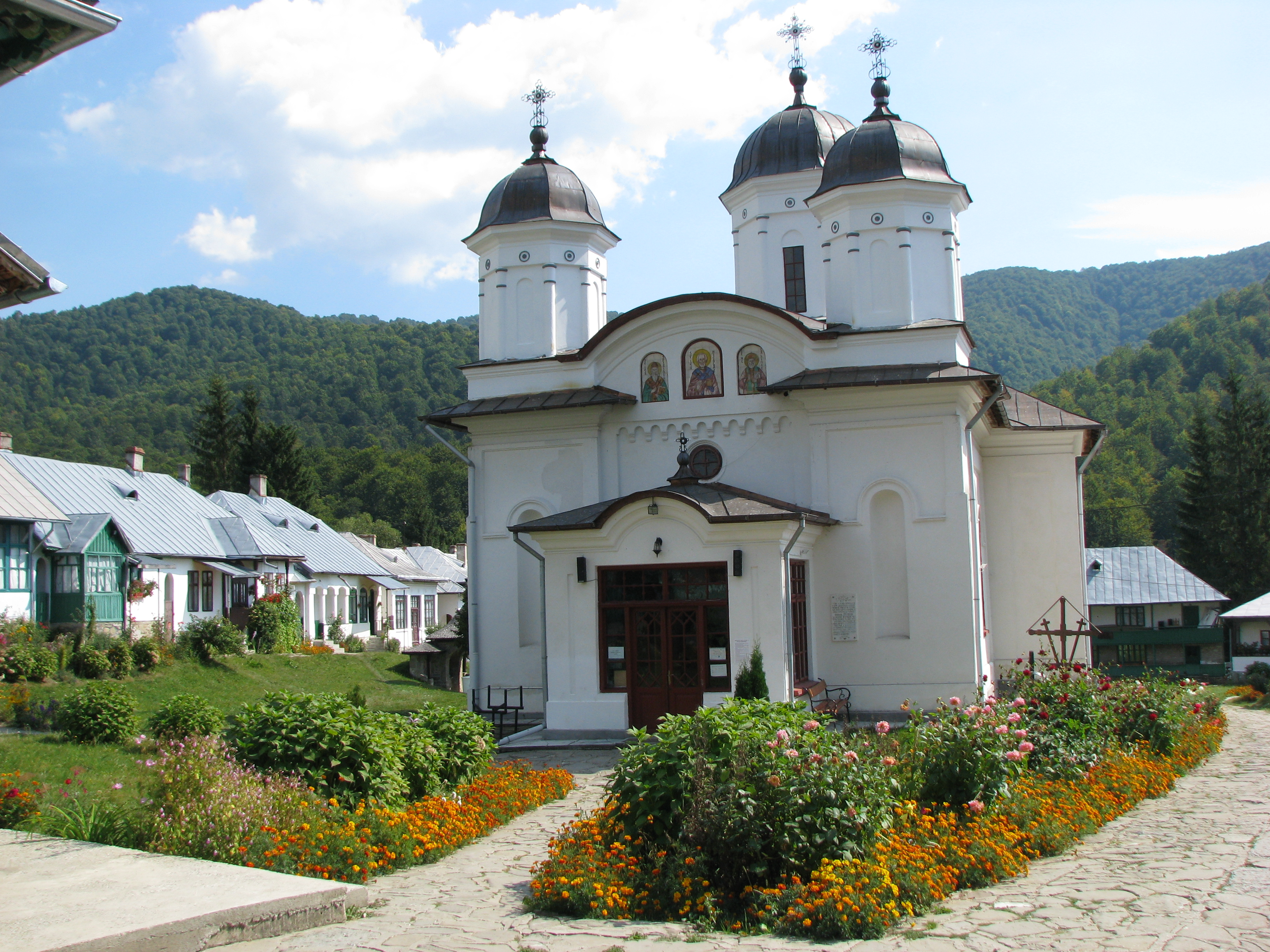
- Suzana Monastery

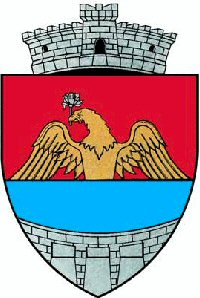
- Coat of arms

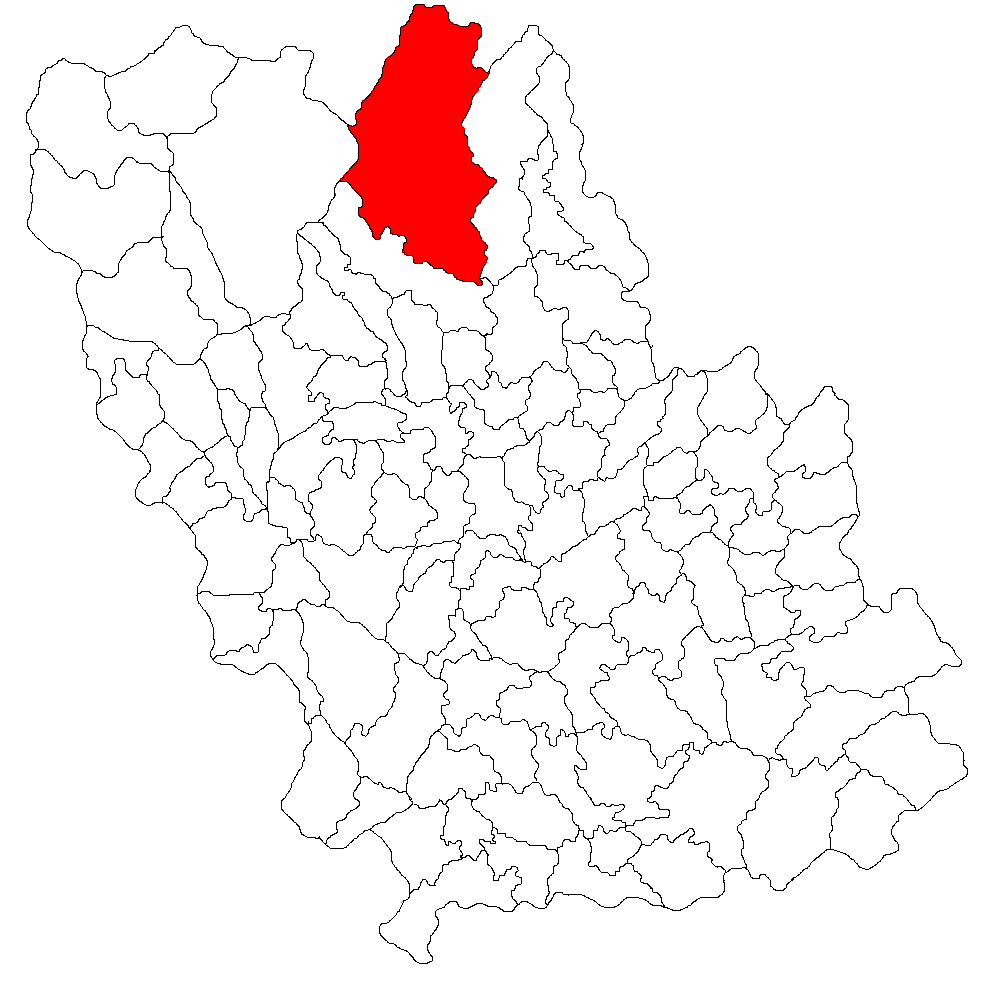
- Location in Prahova County

- Location in Romania
- Coordinates: 45°19′N 25°59′E
- Country: Romania
- County: Prahova

Government
  - Mayor (2020–2024): Florin-Auraș Dragomir (PNL)
- Area: 236.43 km^{2} (91.29 sq mi)
- Elevation: 589 m (1,932 ft)
- Population (2021-12-01): 9,642
  - Density: 40.78/km^{2} (105.6/sq mi)
- Time zone: UTC+02:00 (EET)
  - Summer (DST): UTC+03:00 (EEST)
- Postal code: 107355
- Area code: +(40) 244
- Vehicle reg.: PH
- Website: primaria-maneciu.ro

Măneciu is a commune in Prahova County, Muntenia, Romania. It is composed of nine villages: Cheia, Chiciureni, Costeni, Făcăieni, Gheaba, Măneciu-Pământeni, Măneciu-Ungureni (the commune centre), Mânăstirea Suzana, and Plăiețu.

Cheia village is a mountain resort, surrounded by the Ciucaș Mountains. Cheia Monastery is located to the southeast of the village.

Historical population
Year	Pop.	±%
2002	11,224	—
2011	10,331	−8.0%
2021	9,642	−6.7%
Source: Census data

== Natives ==
- Robert Negoiță (born 1972), politician and businessman
