= Ploiești =

- Municipality and county seat
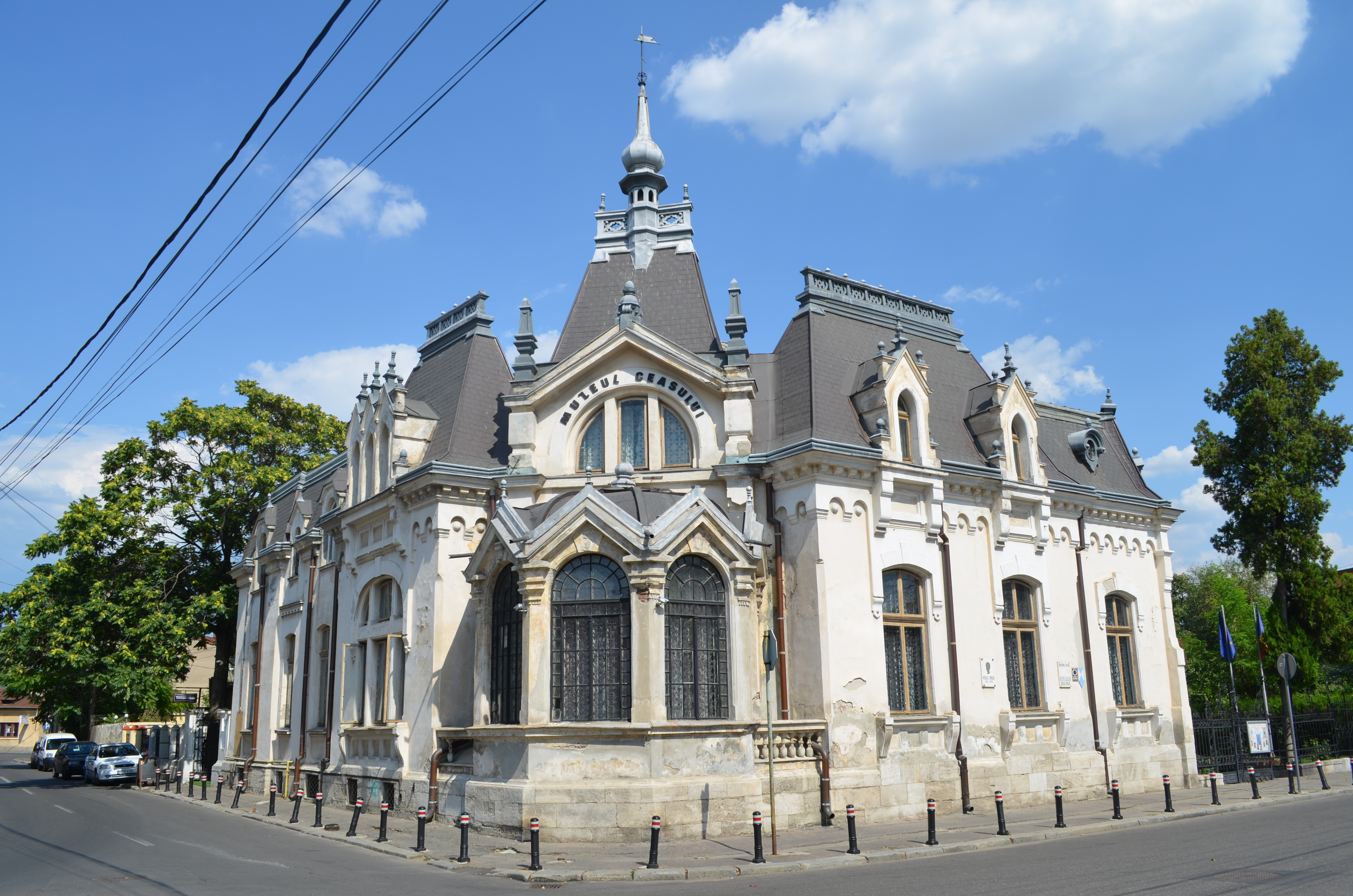
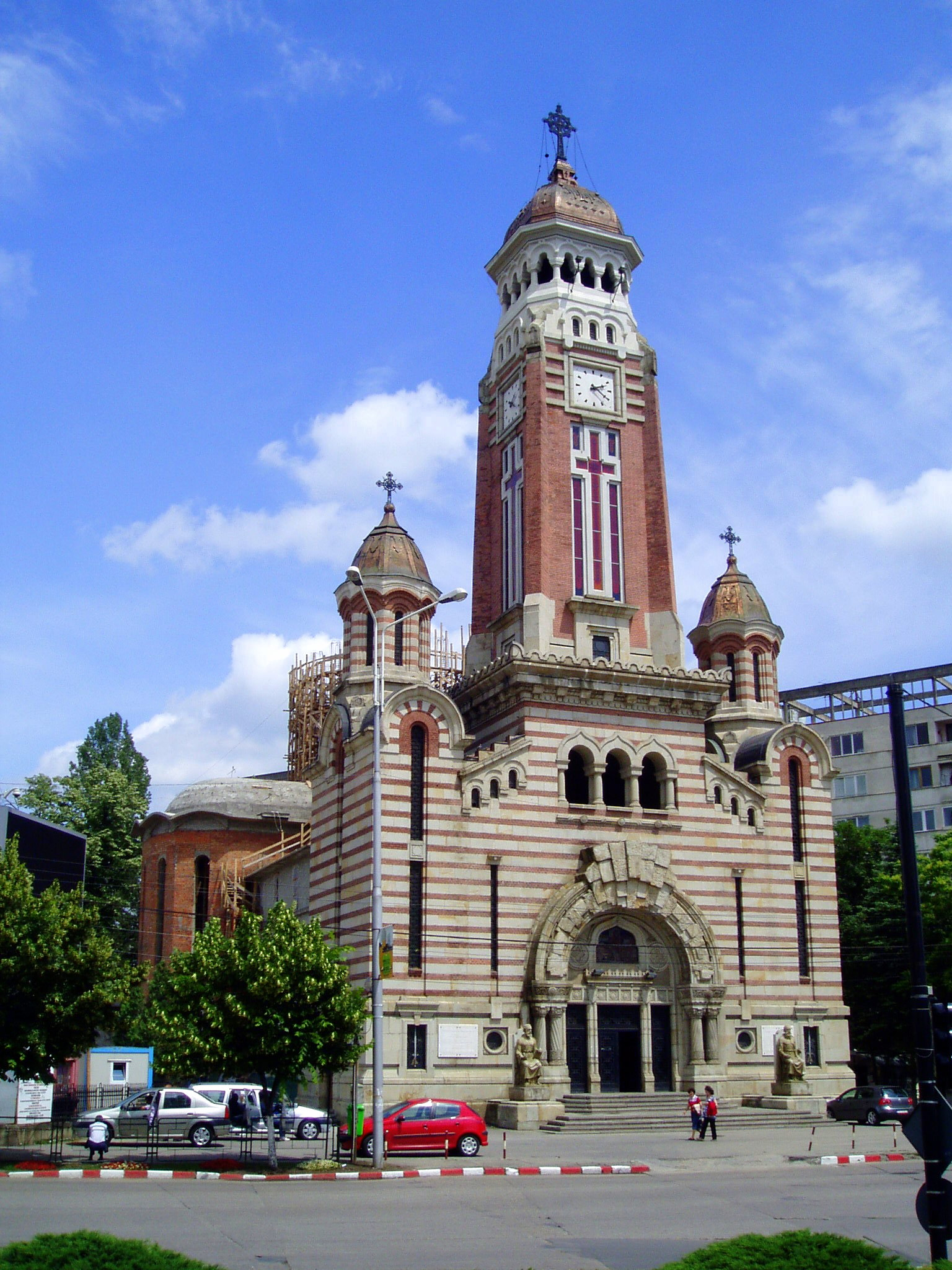
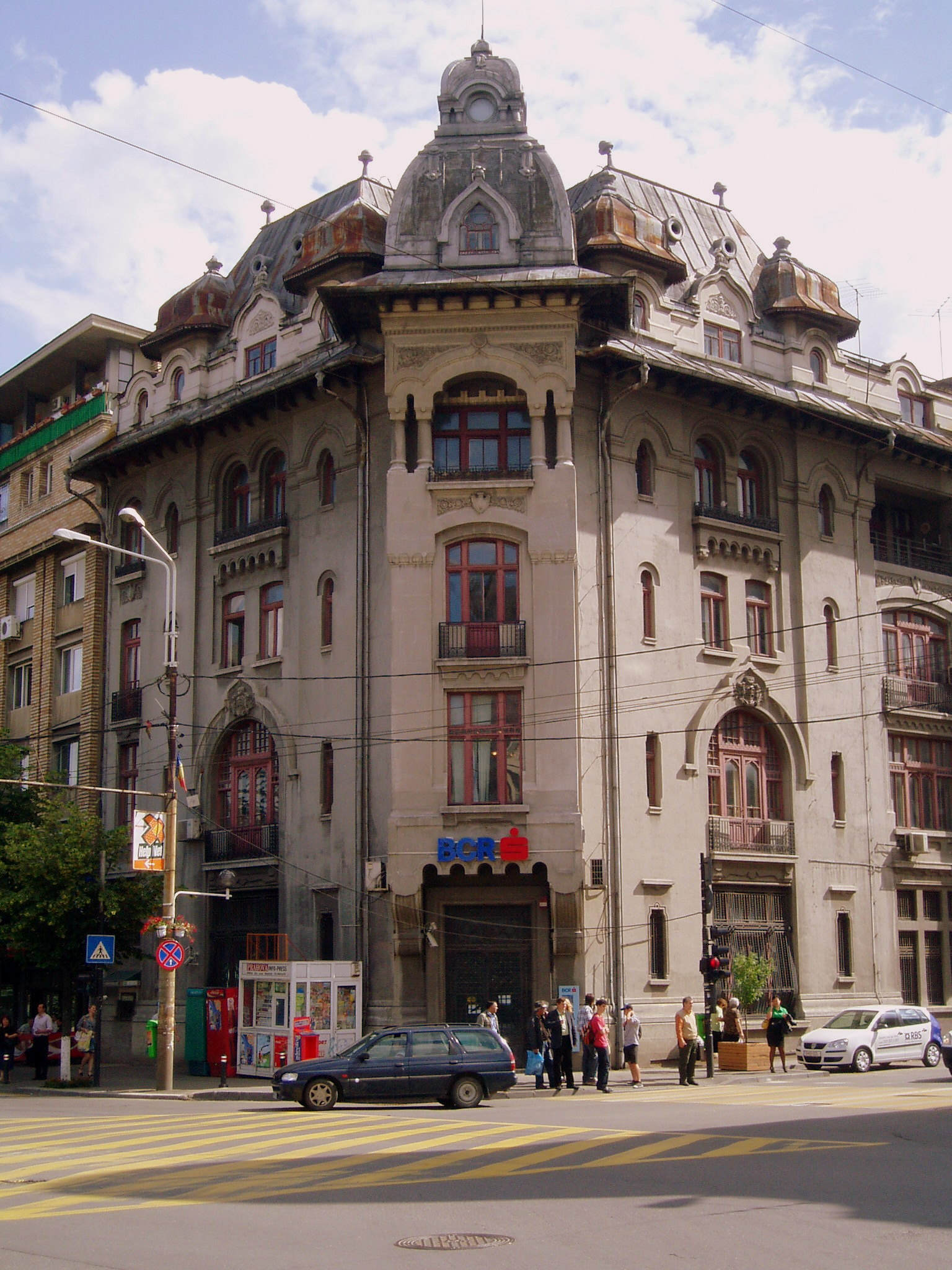
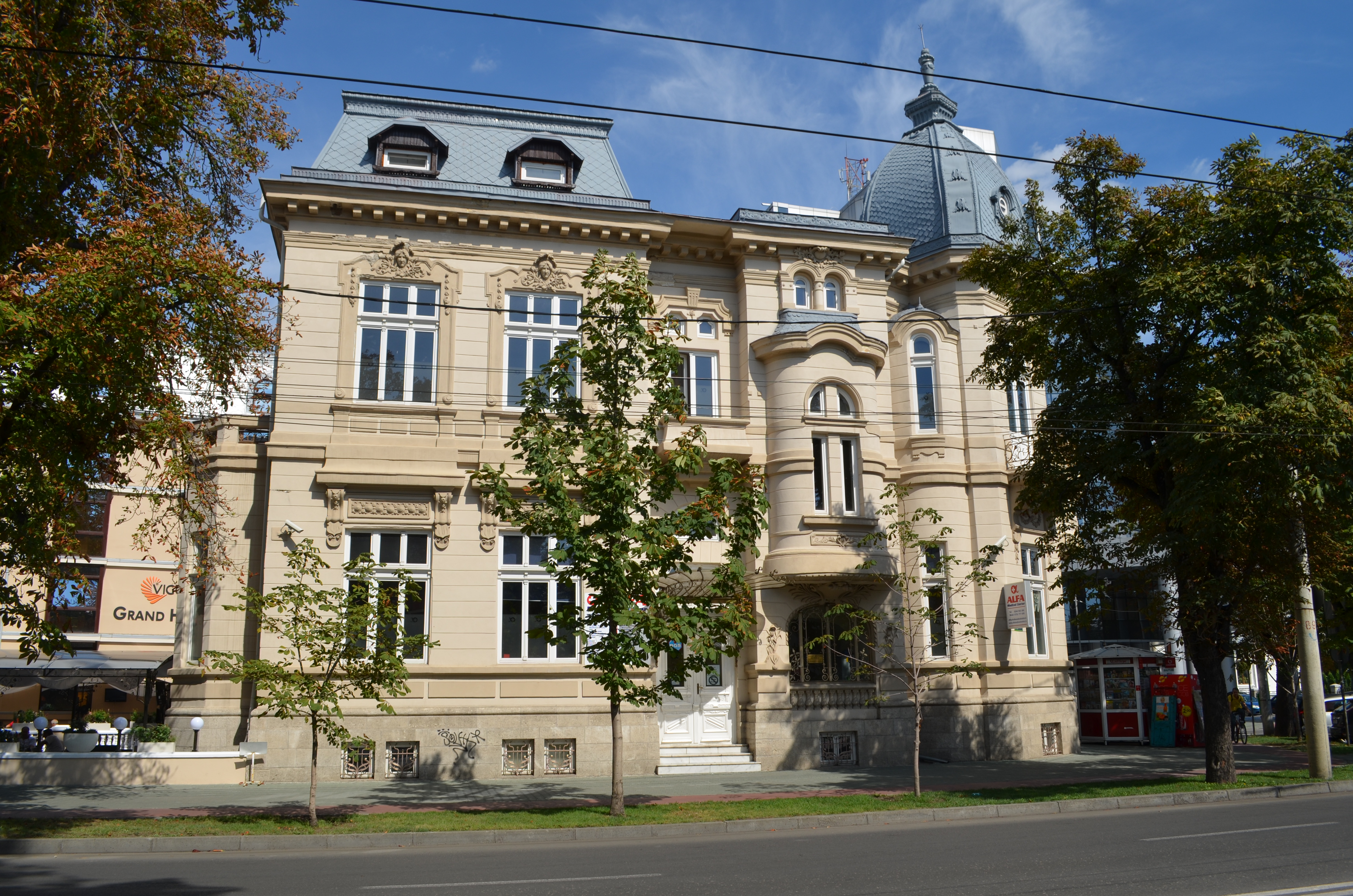
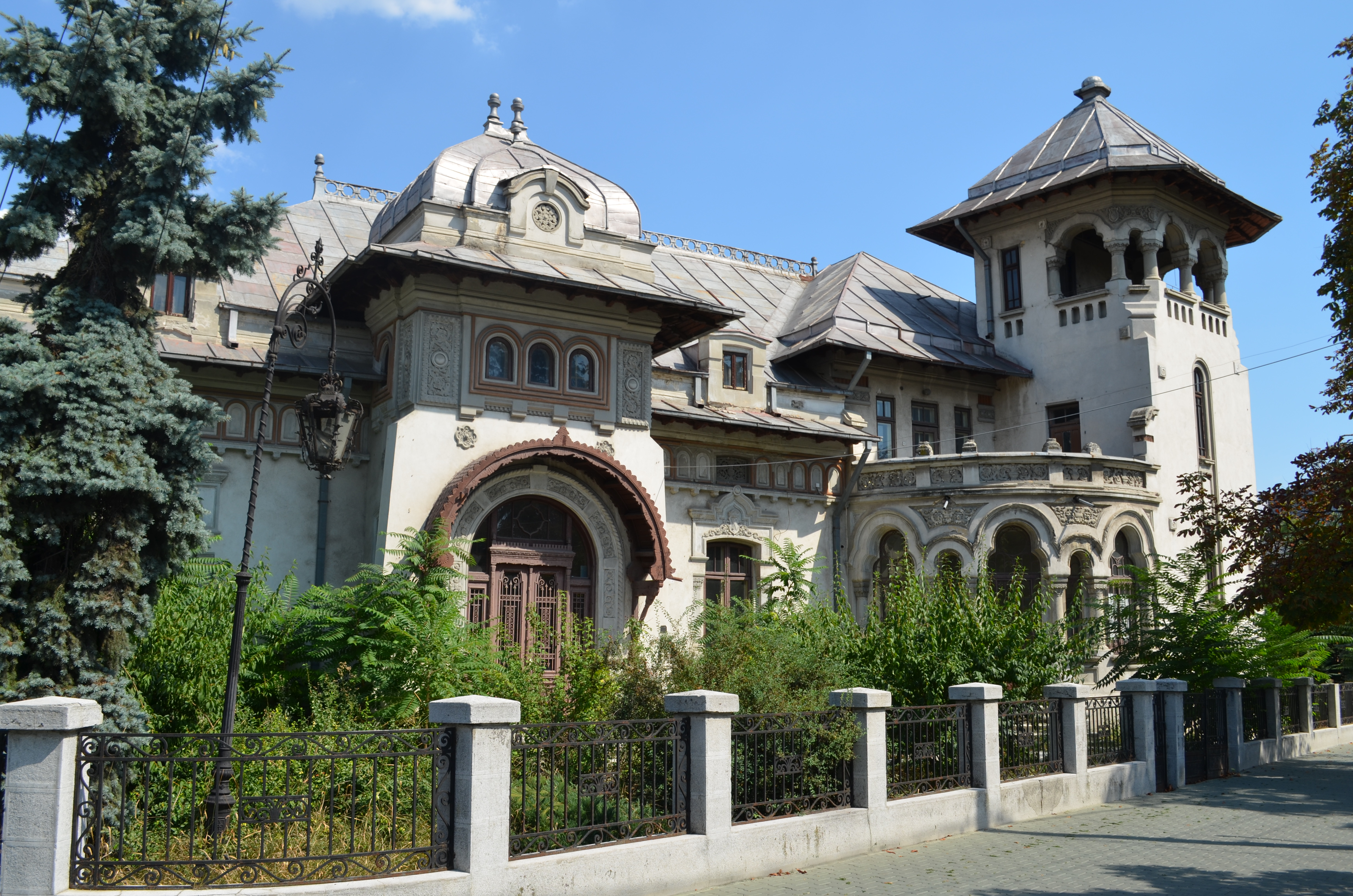
- Left to right: Nicolae Simache Clock Museum, St. John the Baptist Cathedral, the former Creditul Prahovei, the Ghiță Stoenescu House, the Radu Stanian House.

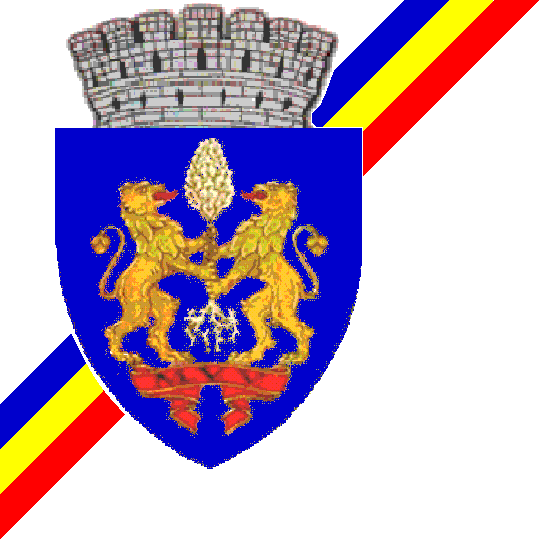
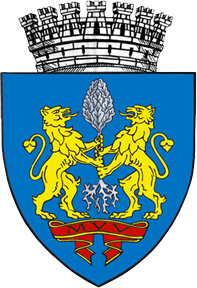
- Flag Coat of arms
- Nickname(s): "Capitala Aurului Negru" (English: "Capital of Black Gold")
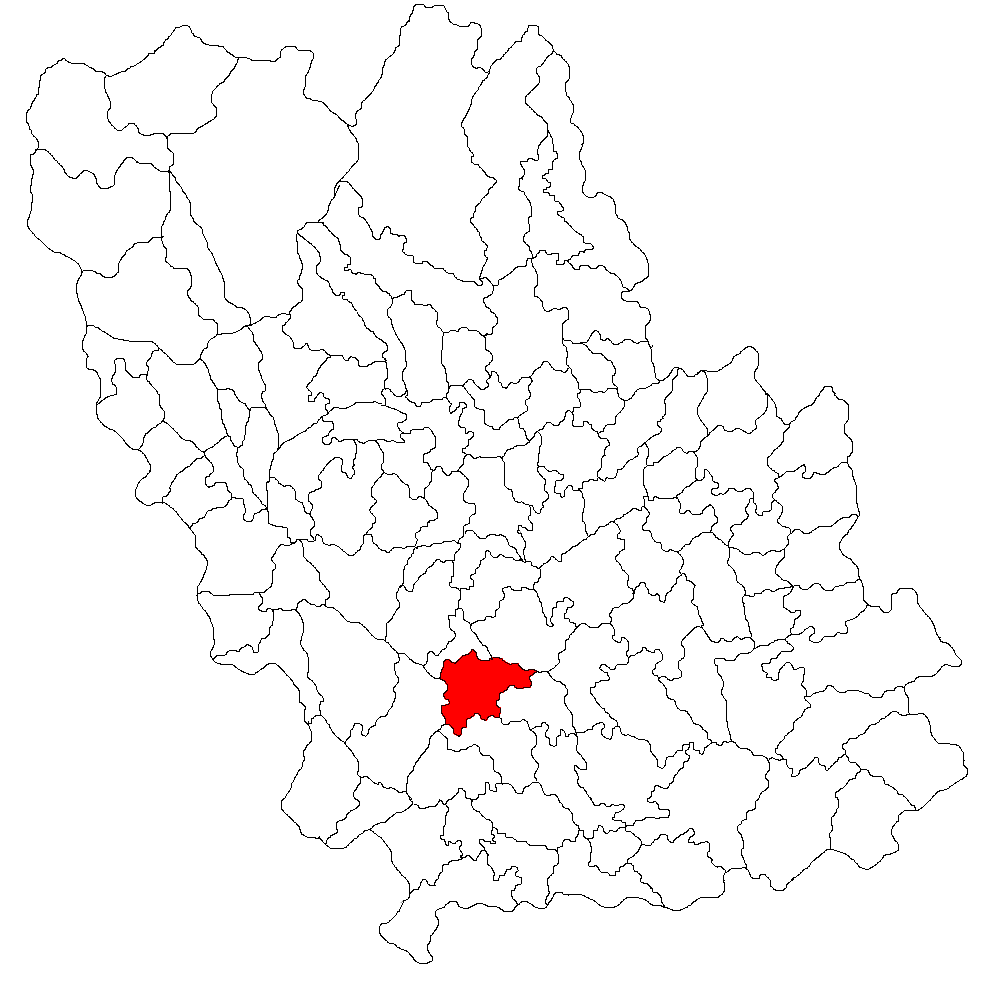
- Location in Prahova County

- Location of Ploiești within Romania
- Coordinates: 44°56′28″N 26°01′21″E
- Country: Romania
- County: Prahova

Government
  - Mayor (2024–2028): Mihai Polițeanu (Ind.)

Area
  - Total: 58.26 km^{2} (22.49 sq mi)
- Elevation: 160 m (520 ft)

Population (2021 census)
  - Total: 180,540
  - Rank: 10th
  - Density: 3,098/km^{2} (8,020/sq mi)
  - Metropolitan area: 266,457
- Time zone: UTC+2 (EET)
  - Summer (DST): UTC+3 (EEST)
- Postal code: 100xxx
- Area code: (+40) x44
- Car plate: PH
- Website: ploiesti.ro

Ploiești, (Note: UK: /plɔɪˈɛʃti/ ploy-ESH-tee, US: /plɔːˈjɛʃt(i)/ plaw-YESHT-ee; Romanian: [ploˈjeʃtʲ].) formerly spelled Ploești, is a city and the county seat of Prahova County, Romania. Situated in the historical region of Muntenia, it lies on the Wallachian Plain, approximately 56 km (35 mi) north of Bucharest. With a population of 180,540 according to the 2021 census, it is the tenth-most populous city in the country and a major urban centre in southern Romania.

The city traces its origins to the late 16th century, when it began developing on an estate established by Michael the Brave. Located along major trade routes connecting Transylvania with the Danube basin, the settlement grew rapidly during the 17th century, gradually overtaking nearby Wallachian market towns such as Târgșor, Gherghița, and Bucov.

The local economy shifted fundamentally in 1857 with the opening of the world's first large-scale oil refinery, establishing the city as a major European centre for petroleum refining and earning it the nickname "Capital of Black Gold". Ensuing industrialisation drove sustained population growth and urban expansion through the 20th century, even amid wartime disruptions and subsequent communist economic programmes.

Today, Ploiești functions as a diversified industrial and service centre while maintaining its historical core in the energy sector. It serves as a major transport hub linking Bucharest with Transylvania and Moldavia, and acts as a gateway to the Prahova Valley tourism region.

== History ==
=== Origins and early development ===
Ploiești was first mentioned in documentary records in 1503 as a modest village located within the historic region of Muntenia. The settlement gained strategic importance in 1597 during the reign of Michael the Brave, the Prince of Wallachia (r. 1593–1601), who designated it a formal market town (târg). Due to its location along major trade routes connecting Transylvania with the Danube basin, Ploiești flourished as a regional centre for commerce and handicrafts throughout the 17th and 18th centuries. Infrastructure expanded rapidly in the late 19th century; a road link connecting Ploiești to Brașov opened in 1864, and the railway arrived in 1882, transforming the town into a primary logistics node.

=== Industrial revolution and oil boom ===
WWII refineries
(monthly metric tonnes):

1. Astra Română (146,000)
2. Colombia Aquila (45,000)
3. Concordia Vega (110,000)
4. Creditul Minier (45,000)
5. Dacia Romana (15,000)
6. Phoenix (65,000)
7. Româno-Americana (92,000)
8. Standard Petrol Block (36,000)
9. Unirea Sperantza (33,000)
10. Xenia (22,000)

In the mid-19th century, the Ploiești region became a global pioneer in the petroleum industry. The Mehedințeanu brothers established the world's first large-scale oil refinery in the city, which became fully operational between 1856 and 1857. This industrial leap triggered rapid urban growth, attracting substantial foreign capital. In 1870, the city became the epicentre of the Republic of Ploiești, a brief local military revolt led by liberal politicians aiming to overthrow the Romanian monarchy. Though the coup failed within a day, it cemented the city's reputation for political radicalism.

During World War I, Ploiești's extensive oil production made it a critical strategic target for the Central Powers. Ahead of the 1916 invasion, a British Army operation commanded by Colonel John Norton-Griffiths systematically sabotaged the city's petroleum infrastructure. British forces set the oil fields ablaze and destroyed processing equipment, significantly delaying the German war effort.

=== World War II and strategic bombings ===
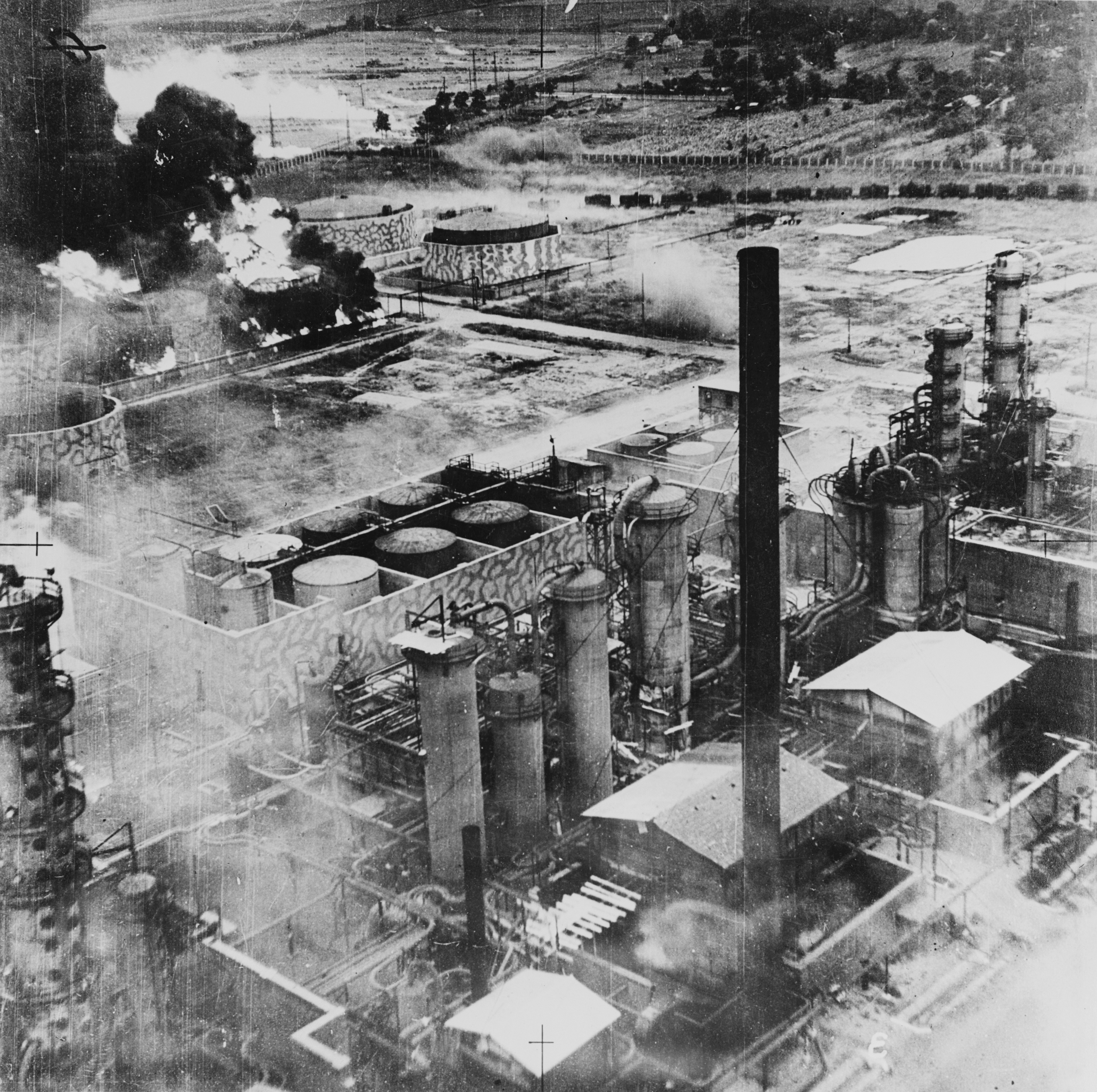
The Columbia Aquila refinery burning after the low-level attack by B-24 Liberator bombers during Operation Tidal Wave in 1943

Despite sustaining heavy damage from the 1940 Vrancea earthquake, Ploiești was rebuilt and served as the primary source of petroleum for Nazi Germany during World War II. (Note: Sources provide differing estimates regarding Romanian production: 1942: The Axis Oil Position in Europe, November 1942 by the Hartley Committee estimated that Romanian oil fields contributed 33% of Axis supplies.; 1944: "Ploiești, thirty-five miles from Bucharest, supplied one-third of all the oil fuel Germany required for war purposes."; 1999: Concentrated regional facilities provided up to 60% of Germany's crude oil supply.)

As early as June 1941 Soviet Air Forces started bombing Ploiești. The Western Allies targeted the city heavily during the oil campaign of World War II. Their early air-operations included the small-scale United States Army Air Forces (USAAF) HALPRO raid in June 1942, followed by the massive Operation Tidal Wave on 1 August 1943. Conducted at low altitude by B-24 Liberator bombers, "Tidal Wave" inflicted severe damage but resulted in heavy Allied casualties and only temporarily slowed production. Relentless strategic high-altitude bombings by the USAAF 15th Air Force and by the British Royal Air Force between April and August 1944 ultimately crippled the refining complexes. In May 1944 two strikes by American bombers reduced Ploiești's fuel output by half.

Soviet Red Army troops entered and secured the disabled city on 24 August 1944 during the Jassy–Kishinev offensive, and the export of fuel to Germany ceased.

=== Post-war and contemporary era ===
Following the war, the communist regime nationalised the privately owned oil industry. The state directed heavy capital investments into regional petroleum and petrochemical sectors to modernise national industrial infrastructure and repair wartime devastation. While the city's economic profile expanded into heavy engineering and manufacturing, the oil sector remained its core. In the post-1989 post-communist transition, these complexes were progressively privatised, adapting Ploiești into a modern, diversified logistics and industrial center.

== Demographics ==
Historical population
Year	Pop.	±%
1810	2,024	—
1859	26,468	+1207.7%
1899	45,107	+70.4%
1912	56,460	+25.2%
1930	79,149	+40.2%
1941	107,068	+35.3%
1948	95,632	−10.7%
1956	114,544	+19.8%
1966	146,922	+28.3%
1977	199,699	+35.9%
1992	252,715	+26.5%
2002	232,527	−8.0%
2011	209,945	−9.7%
2021	180,540	−14.0%
Source: Romanian census data

Following a century of continuous growth, the population of Ploiești peaked in January 1992 at 252,715 inhabitants. In line with wider post-communist demographic trends across Romania, the city's population has since experienced a steady decline due to outward migration and a falling birth rate, dropping to 232,527 at the 2002 census, and further to 209,945 in 2011. By the 2021 census, the city's population stood at 180,540.

=== Ethnicity and religion ===
According to final data from the 2011 census, ethnic Romanians constitute the vast majority of the city's population at 90.64%. A Romani minority makes up 2.41% of the population, concentrated primarily in the peripheral neighbourhoods of Bereasca, Mimiu, and Radu de la Afumați. Other smaller ethnic groups comprise less than 0.5% combined, while ethnicity data was unavailable or undeclared for 6.65% of residents. In terms of religious affiliation, 90.7% of inhabitants identified as Eastern Orthodox Christians, with small minority communities of Adventists, Pentecostals, and Roman Catholics.

=== Historical trends ===
The historical growth of Ploiești was intrinsically linked to its industrialisation and the subsequent development of the oil industry. In 1810, under Ottoman administration, the settlement was a modest locality with an estimated 2,024 residents. Following the 1859 union of Wallachia and Moldavia, this figure grew significantly to 26,468, reaching approximately 32,000 by 1884. The turn of the 20th century marked an era of aggressive urban expansion fueled by petroleum refining. Despite suffering extensive civilian infrastructure damage and losing significant population segments during the World War II strategic bombing campaigns, the city recovered quickly, recording 95,632 residents by January 1948.

== Economy ==
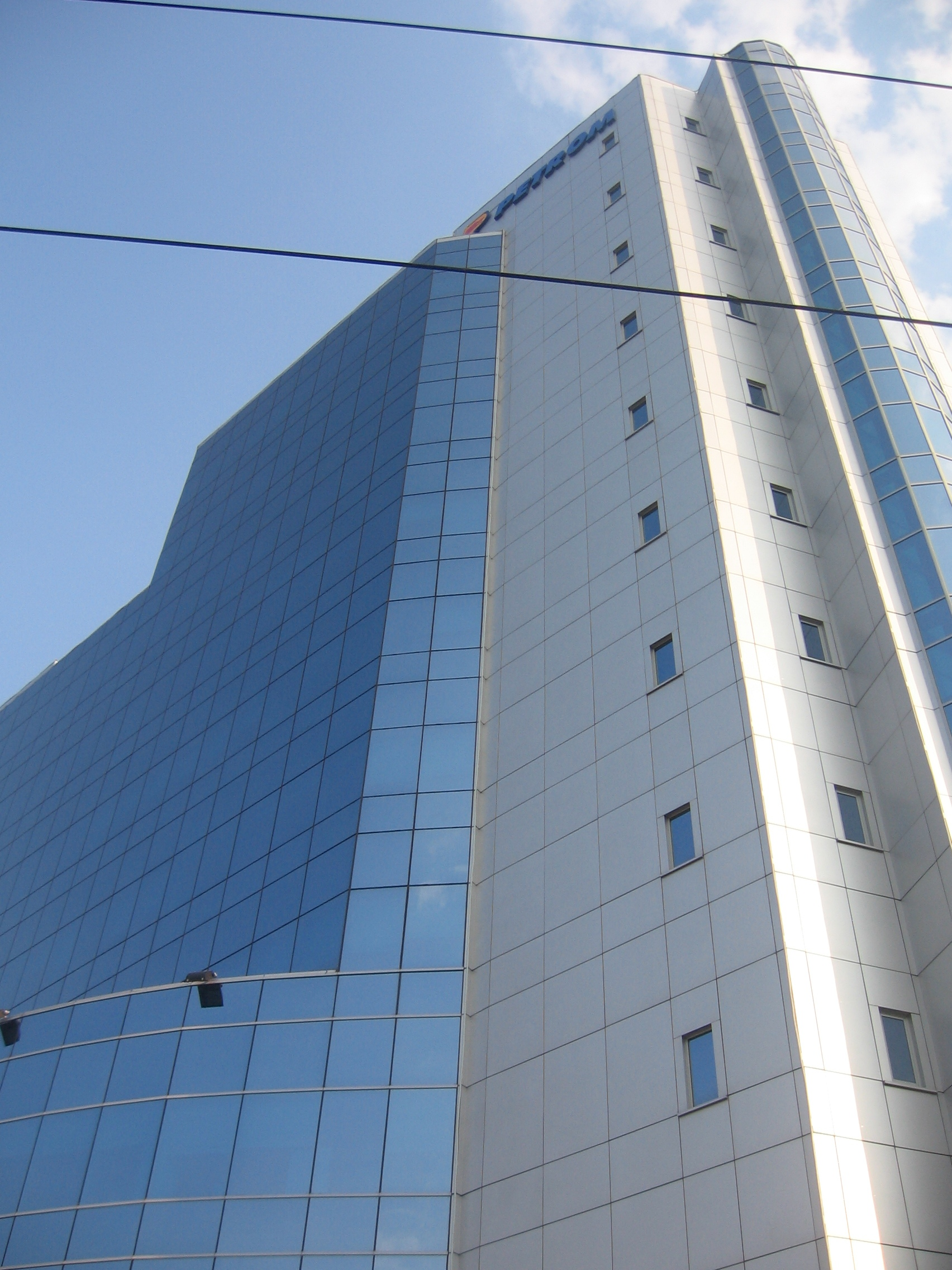
The Ploiești City Hall, which formerly served as the headquarters of the Romanian energy corporation Petrom.

Following the political transitions of 1989, Ploiești underwent significant structural economic changes. Located roughly 60 km (37 mi) north of Bucharest, the city serves as a primary industrial centre heavily focused on petroleum extraction, logistics, and processing. Although regional crude oil extraction has entered a long-term decline, the city sustains a robust processing industry encompassing operational oil refineries linked via dedicated distribution pipelines to Bucharest, the Black Sea port of Constanța, and the Danube port of Giurgiu. Ploiești also maintains historical roots as a regional hub for textile manufacturing.

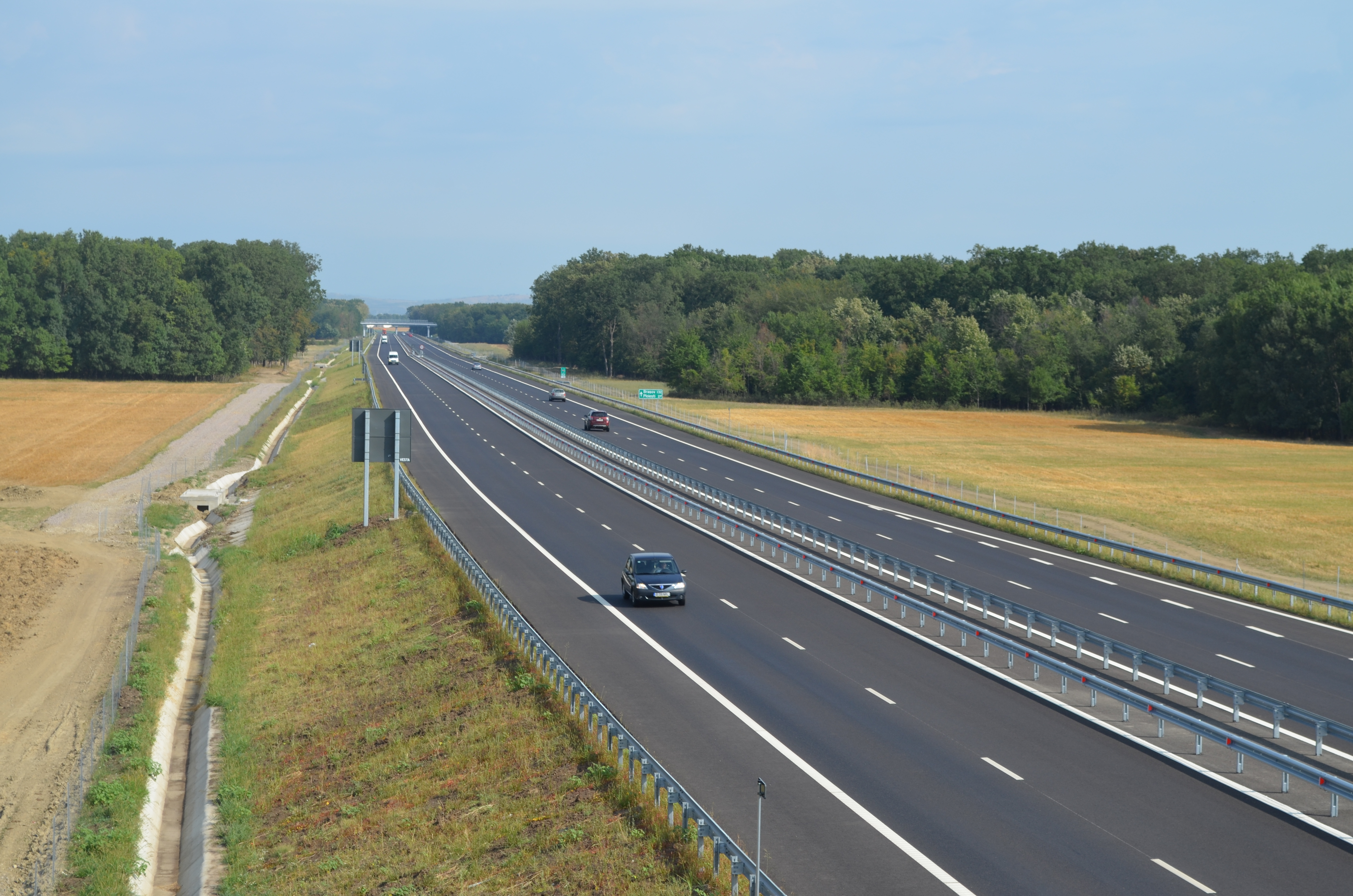
The A3 motorway links Ploiești with Bucharest, 60 km (37 mi) to the south.

The city attracts substantial foreign direct investment, hosting manufacturing and logistical operations for multinational firms including OMV-Petrom, Lukoil, Shell Gas, the Timken, Yazaki, Coca-Cola, Efes Pilsener, British American Tobacco, and Federal-Mogul. The local retail sector expanded heavily during the 2000s and 2010s, with large-scale hypermarkets and supermarkets operated by Carrefour, Metro, Selgros, Kaufland, Lidl, Auchan, Profi, and Mega Image. The former facilities of the French retailer Interex, which exited the domestic market in 2012, were acquired and repurposed by Penny Market XXL in 2014.

In 2006, consumer goods manufacturer Unilever consolidated its corporate activities in Romania by building a major production hub in Ploiești, transferring food and detergent production lines from Otopeni and Târgu Mureș to the unified site. Engineering and industrial design support for the energy sector is led by SC IPIP SA, a specialised Engineering and Design Institute for Oil Refineries and Petrochemical Plants established in the city in 1950. Regional media outlets operating in the municipal area include regional television stations such as Ploiești TV, Valea Prahovei TV, Wyll TV, and Prahova TV.

== Transportation ==
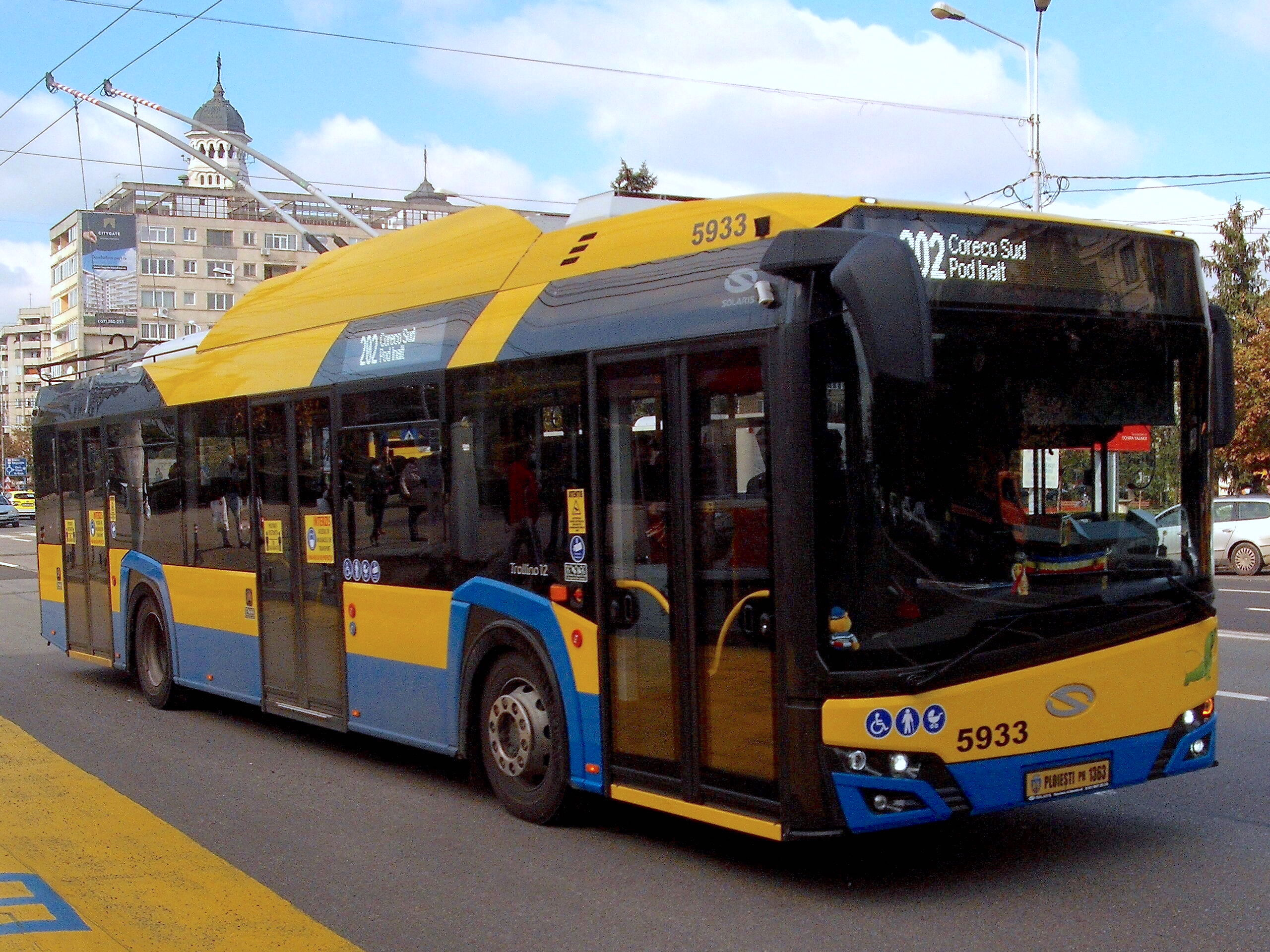
A Solaris trolleybus operating on the Ploiești municipal network.

Ploiești serves as a major national transport and logistics hub, situated at the junction of the A3 motorway (connecting Bucharest to Ploiești) and the planned A7 motorway heading towards Moldavia. The city is located 45 km (28 mi) north of Henri Coandă International Airport and provides road access to the tourist resorts of the Prahova Valley. Ploiești is an important railway junction, linking Bucharest with rail corridors leading to Transylvania and Moldavia.

The local public transport network is managed by Transport Călători Express (TCE) Ploiești and comprises an integrated system of buses, trolleybuses, and trams. The municipal road infrastructure covers over 800 streets with a total length of 324 km (201 mi), of which 241 km (150 mi) are modernised. Regional and long-distance commercial traffic is routed around the city core via dedicated eastern and western ring roads. The public transport network consists of 33 motorbus lines spanning a combined 415.46 km (258.15 mi), two trolleybus routes covering 19.9 km (12.4 mi), and two tram lines operating over 23.8 km (14.8 mi).

== Culture ==
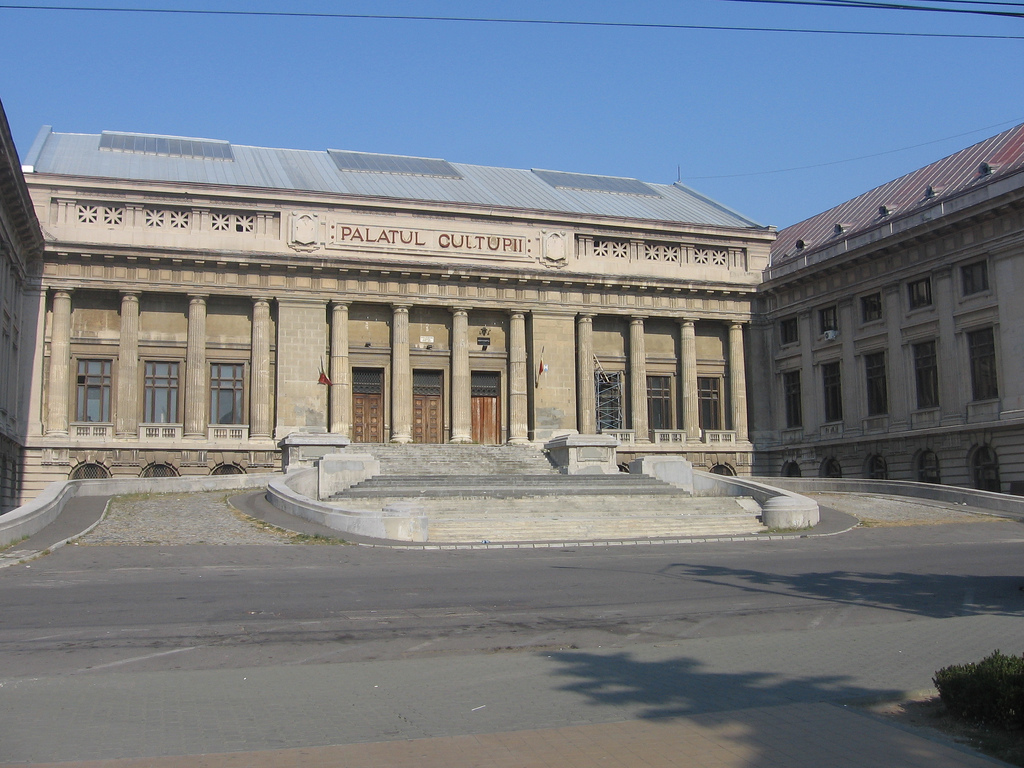
The Ploiești Palace of Culture.

=== Architecture and cultural landmarks ===
Ploiești features a variety of cultural and architectural monuments. Notable landmarks include the Palace of Culture, the Oil Museum, and the Ploiești Art Museum, which houses collections originally donated by the Quintus family. The Clock Museum, established by historian Nicolae Simache, showcases a prominent historical collection of clocks and watches. The Hagi Prodan Museum, dating to 1785, preserves traditional elements of old Romanian merchant architecture; shortly after World War I, it served as the original home of the city's first institutional collection, the Prahova Museum.

A significant portion of the city's municipal architecture, including the Central Market Hall, was designed by architect Toma T. Socolescu, who was born in Ploiești and later served as its mayor. Many of Socolescu's historical designs were destroyed during the World War II Allied strategic bombing campaigns, or subsequently demolished during the communist-era systematisation policies. Performing arts are anchored by the Ploiești Philharmonic Orchestra.

The local sports profile is defined by its primary professional football club, FC Petrolul Ploiești, which plays its home matches at the Ilie Oană Stadium.

=== Affiliated figures ===
Several prominent Romanian cultural figures, writers, and scholars have been historically affiliated with the city, including Ion Luca Caragiale, Constantin Dobrogeanu-Gherea, Ioan A. Bassarabescu, Nichita Stănescu, Geo Bogza, Radu Tudoran, composer Paul Constantinescu, and philosopher Petre P. Negulescu. Three graduates of the city's historical "Sfinții Petru și Pavel" High School subsequently served as presidents of the Romanian Academy: Andrei Rădulescu, Mihai Drăgănescu, and Eugen Simion.

== Education ==
The first formal school in Ploiești opened in 1777, and by 1832 several other elementary institutions were established. Secondary education was first introduced to the city in 1864.

The city is home to the following higher education institutions:

- Oil & Gas University of Ploiești, founded in 1948 in Bucharest and relocated to Ploiești in 1967.
- George Barițiu University, which operates a specialized local campus established in 2002.

Prominent secondary schools and colleges in Ploiești include:

- Mihai Viteazul National College
- Ion Luca Caragiale National College
- Jean Monnet National College
- Alexandru Ioan Cuza National College
- Nichita Stănescu National College
- Virgil Madgearu Economic College
- Spiru Haret High School
- Lazăr Edeleanu Technical College
- Carmen Sylva Art High School
- Constantin Brâncoveanu Military School
- Toma N. Socolescu High School
- Victor Slăvescu Technological High School of Administration and Services

== Geology ==
The Mio-Pliocene Zone in the Ploiești region has been heavily exploited for hydrocarbons and coal since the 19th century. Geologically, this structural zone extends from the northern flysch nappes to the southern Moesian Platform. The sedimentary sequence is characterised by alternating deposits of clay, marl, shale, sand, conglomerate, salt, and limestone.

Subsurface structural traps and stratigraphic traps were formed primarily by salt diapirism, which generated faulting and complex anticline folds. These anticlines follow four major structural alignments running parallel to the Carpathian Range. Pliocene-age sands serve as the primary regional oil and gas reservoirs—specifically the Meotian stage, which accounts for approximately 60% of production, and the Dacian stage, accounting for 29%. These are followed by the Miocene Sarmatian stage at 5%, with minor petroleum accumulations occurring in Miocene Helvetian and Oligocene sandstones. The primary producing structures in the district include the Moreni–Gura Ocniței, Băicoi–Țintea, and Boldești fields.

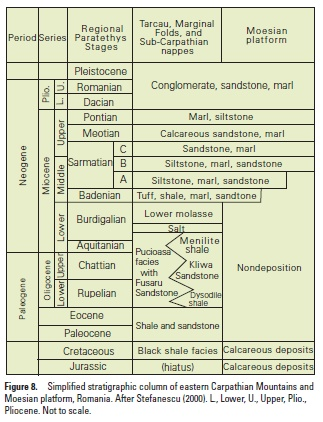
Stratigraphic column of the Eastern Carpathians and Moesian Platform.

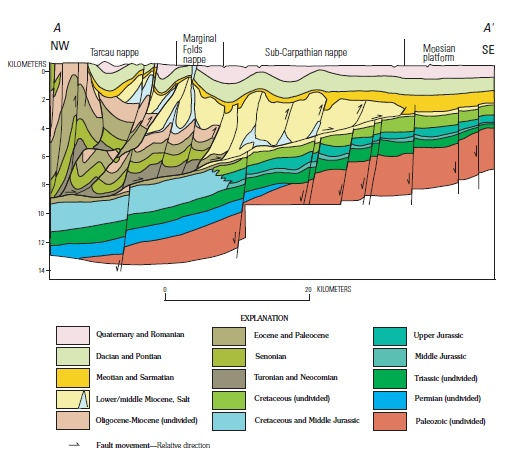
Geological cross-section of the Carpathian Bend zone.

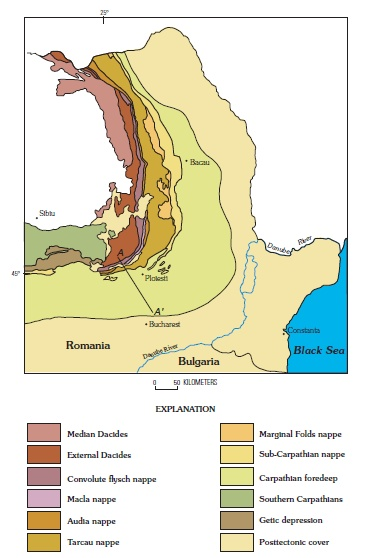
Regional geological features of the Carpathian Basin.

== Geography ==
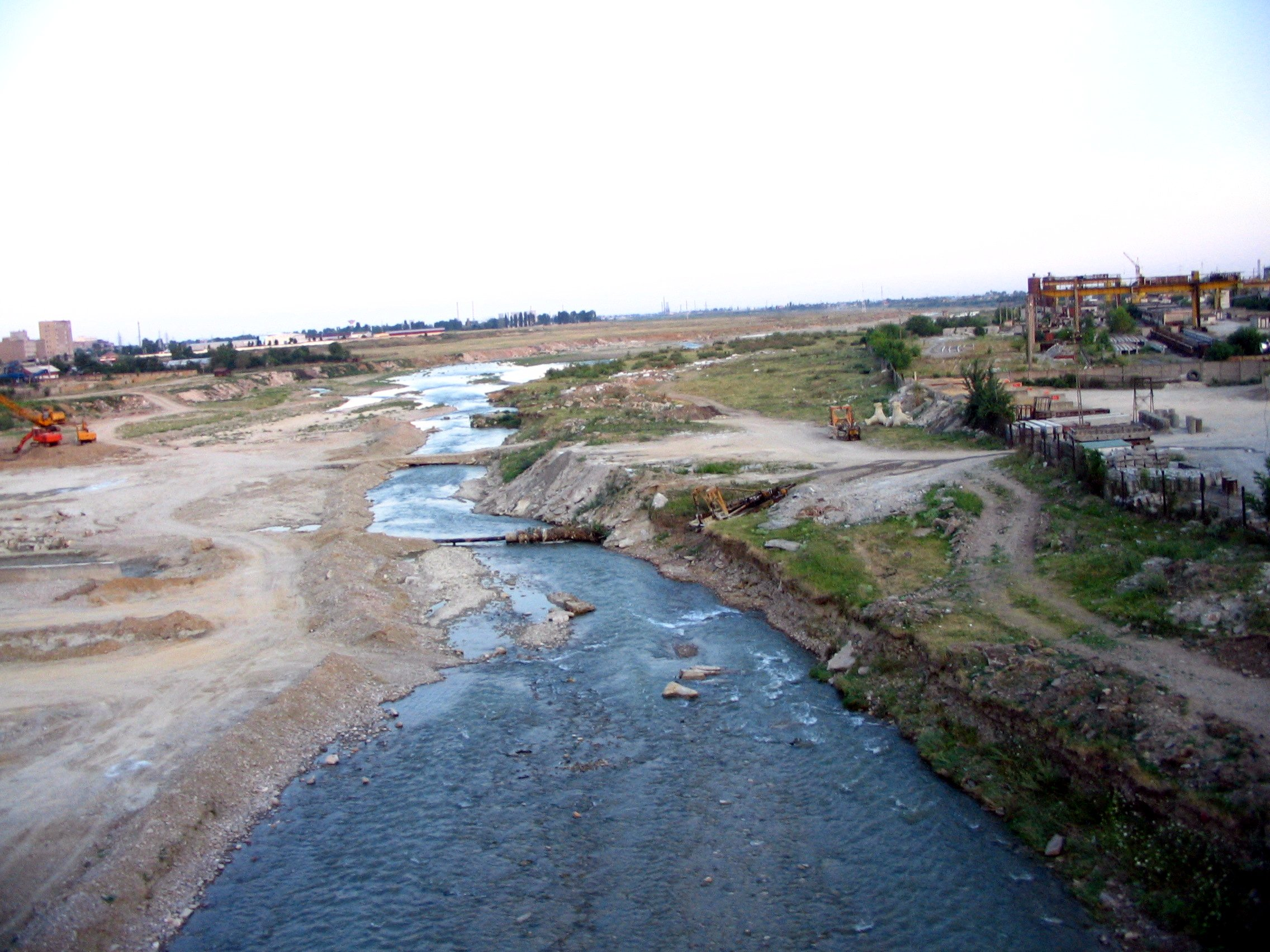
The Teleajen River in Prahova County.

Ploiești lies in the centre of Muntenia, in the central-northern part of the Wallachian Plain. Situated north of Bucharest, the city has maintained close economic and logistics links with the national capital throughout its history. It is positioned at the 25°E meridian and the 44°55’N parallel. The municipality occupies a total area of approximately 60 km^{2} (23 sq mi), of which 35 km^{2} (14 sq mi) consists of built-up urban and suburban settlements.

The local hydrology features three watercourses. The Prahova River flows briefly through the southwestern edge of the metropolitan area near Brazi, while the Teleajen River passes nearby, skirting the surrounding villages of Blejoi, Bucov, and Berceni. The city itself is situated on the Dâmbu River, which originates in the hills surrounding the town of Băicoi and maintains a low seasonal flow rate through the municipal area.

=== Nearest towns ===
Town	Direction	Distance		
Town	Direction	Straight-line	Road	Rail
Bucharest	S	56 km (35 mi)	60 km (37 mi)	59 km (37 mi)
Brăila	E	155 km (96 mi)	170 km (110 mi)	176 km (109 mi)
Pitești	W	91 km (57 mi)	111 km (69 mi)	149 km (93 mi)
Brașov	NW	86 km (53 mi)	114 km (71 mi)	110 km (68 mi)
Târgoviște	W	46 km (29 mi)	51 km (32 mi)	52 km (32 mi)
Buzău	NE	66 km (41 mi)	71 km (44 mi)	69 km (43 mi)
Urziceni	SE	55 km (34 mi)	60 km (37 mi)	55 km (34 mi)

=== Climate ===
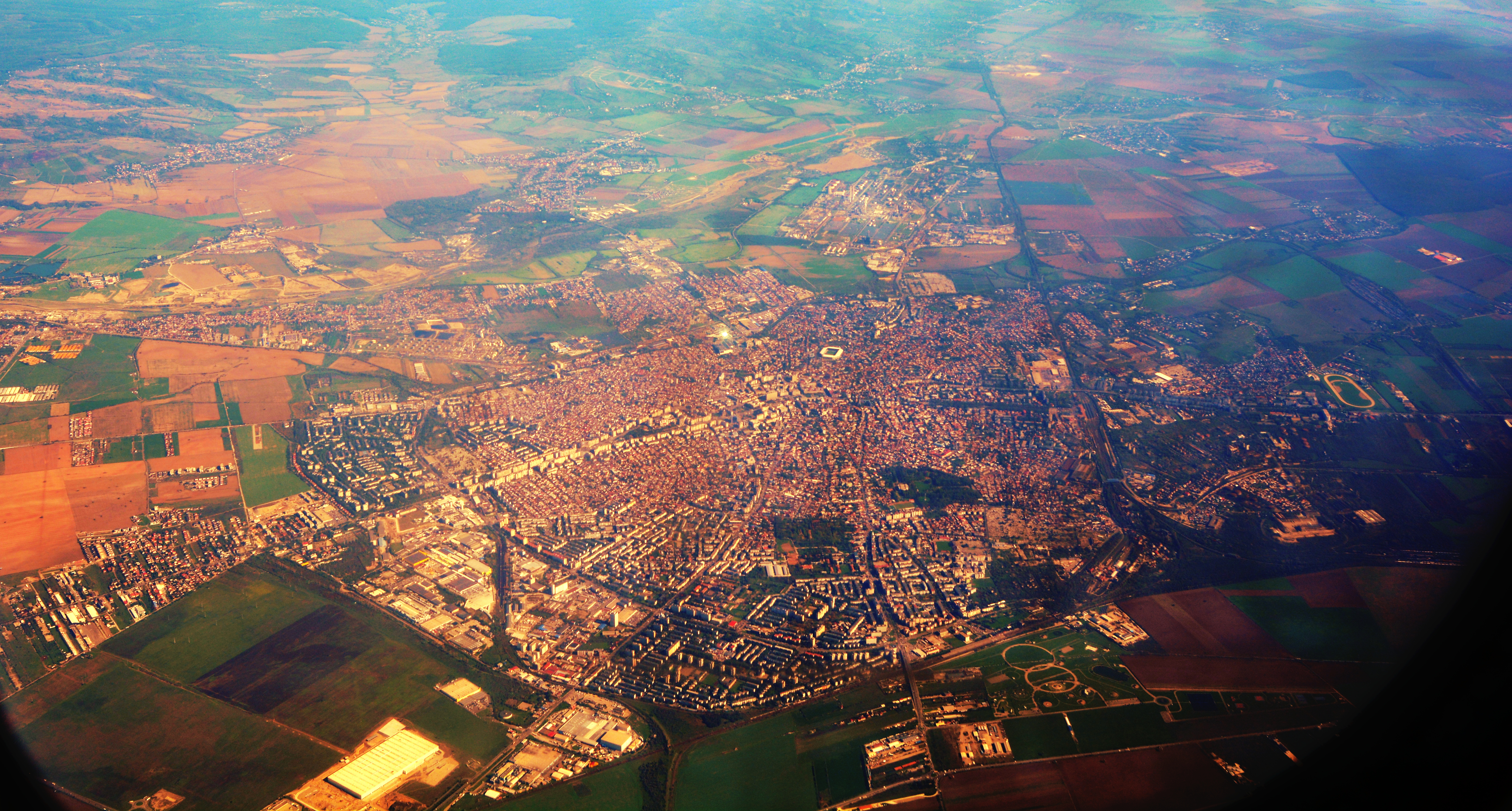
Aerial photograph of Ploiești from the west, 2025.

Ploiești experiences a temperate humid continental climate (Dfa) of the hot-summer type according to the Köppen climate classification. The average annual temperature is 10.5 °C (50.9 °F). The highest recorded temperature in the city was 43 °C (109 °F) on 19 July 2007, while the record minimum was −30 °C (−22 °F) on 25 January 1952. Annually, the weather profile averages 17 extremely cold days, 26 cold days, 99 warm days, and 30 tropical days.

Average annual precipitation is approximately 600 mm (24 in), ranging historically from a maximum of 963.9 mm (37.95 in) in 1901 to a minimum of 305.3 mm (12.02 in) in 1930. The city averages 104 rainy days and 26 snowy days per year. Local weather patterns are strongly influenced by regional winds originating from the northeast (40%) and southeast (23%), carrying an average velocity of 3.1 m/s (10 ft/s).

Climate data for Ploiești
Month	Jan	Feb	Mar	Apr	May	Jun	Jul	Aug	Sep	Oct	Nov	Dec	Year
Mean daily maximum °C (°F)	5.9 (42.6)	9.0 (48.2)	13.3 (55.9)	18.7 (65.7)	23.0 (73.4)	28.8 (83.8)	31.1 (88.0)	31.7 (89.1)	26.3 (79.3)	19.3 (66.7)	11.4 (52.5)	7.0 (44.6)	18.8 (65.8)
Daily mean °C (°F)	0.8 (33.4)	3.3 (37.9)	7.0 (44.6)	11.8 (53.2)	16.5 (61.7)	21.9 (71.4)	23.9 (75.0)	24.2 (75.6)	19.2 (66.6)	12.7 (54.9)	7.0 (44.6)	2.9 (37.2)	12.6 (54.7)
Mean daily minimum °C (°F)	−4.4 (24.1)	−2.5 (27.5)	0.7 (33.3)	4.9 (40.8)	9.9 (49.8)	15.0 (59.0)	16.7 (62.1)	16.8 (62.2)	12.0 (53.6)	6.1 (43.0)	2.6 (36.7)	−1.2 (29.8)	6.4 (43.5)
Average precipitation mm (inches)	36.3 (1.43)	20.1 (0.79)	36.0 (1.42)	46.8 (1.84)	71.9 (2.83)	72.3 (2.85)	63.7 (2.51)	34.5 (1.36)	37.1 (1.46)	58.6 (2.31)	55.4 (2.18)	39.8 (1.57)	596.9 (23.50)
Source: weatheronline.co.uk

=== Landscape and flora ===
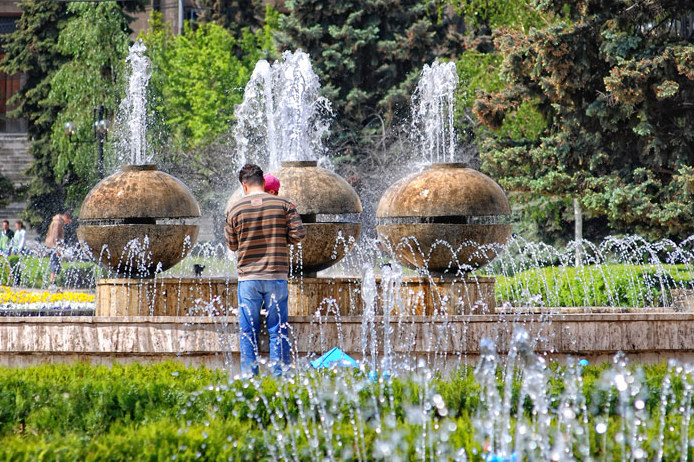
The Ploiești Central Park.

The municipality sits on the plains of the southern sub-Carpathian fringe at an average altitude of 150 m (490 ft). The surrounding landscape is shaped by its proximity to the Prahova valley basin to the west, while the Dâmbu River traverses the northeastern neighbourhoods.

The historical native vegetation of the Ploiești region was characterised by lowland plain forests composed predominantly of pedunculate oak (Quercus robur) and sessile oak (Quercus petraea). Remnants of this old-growth woodland are preserved on the southern periphery of the city in Ghighiu, where several centuries-old oak trees are protected under local conservation status.

Modern municipal flora consists primarily of introduced urban ornamental trees and plantations, including horse chestnut, aspen, and black locust. Public green infrastructure totals approximately 85.5 ha (211 acres) across municipal parks—including the Central Boulevard, Sala Sporturilor Park, Northern Park, Mihai Viteazul Park, and the Bucov Barrier park—yielding an average of 3.2 m^{2} (34 sq ft) of green space per inhabitant. Individual specimens of exotic or vulnerable trees are protected by law, such as a giant redwood (Sequoiadendron giganteum) located in the gardens of the Paul Constantinescu Museum.

== Politics ==
The Ploiești Local Council, renewed in the 2024 local elections, consists of 27 councillors with the following political composition:

Party	Seats	Current Council
Alianța PSD-PUSL (PSD–PUSL)	6	
National Liberal Party (PNL)	6	
United Right Alliance (ADU: USR–PMP–FD)	5	
Partidul Mișcarea Noi, Ploieștenii (MNP)	4	
Alliance for the Union of Romanians (AUR)	4	
Partidul România în Acțiune (RÎA)	2	

Following the same electoral cycle, independent candidate Mihai Polițeanu was elected as the municipality's new mayor. In terms of residential infrastructure, the municipality encompasses approximately 88,104 flats distributed across 21,172 distinct buildings. Public utility metrics indicate that 93% of local households maintain access to drinking water pipelines, 90% are connected to the central sewage network, 98% possess grid electricity coverage, and 78% utilize the centralized municipal district heating system.

=== Metropolitan area ===
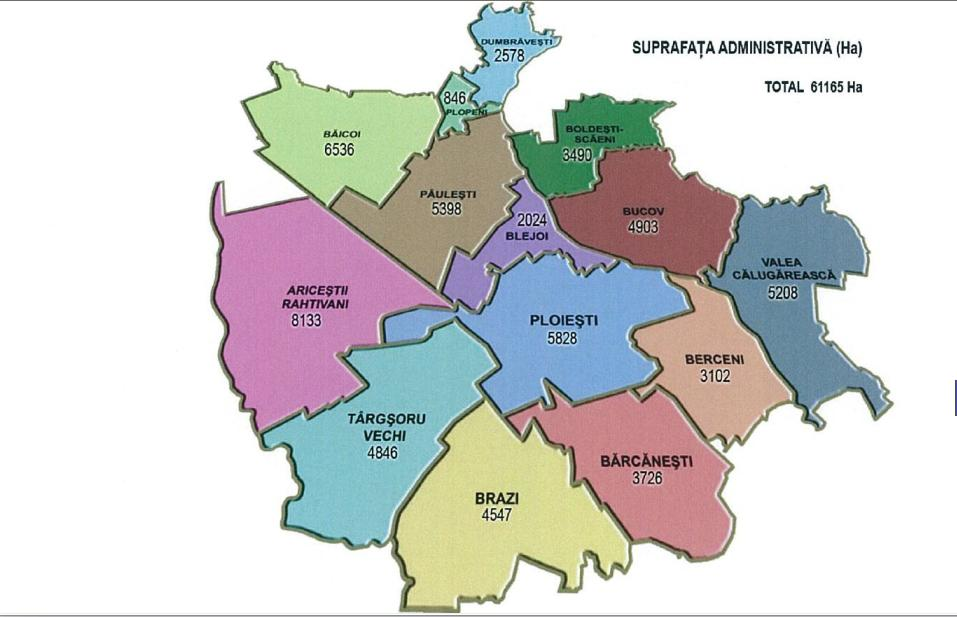
The Ploiești metropolitan area layout configuration.

The Ploiești metropolitan area comprises the city core along with 13 surrounding satellite municipalities. The territory functions as a major transit zone for two intersecting Pan-European transport corridors, integrating both rail and motorway infrastructure networks. The regional inter-municipal administration coordinates localized technical infrastructure developments, expands metropolitan communication lines, and develops ecological initiatives targeting urban carbon footprint reductions.

== Twin towns – sister cities ==
Ploiești is twinned with:

- Berat, Albania
- Harbin, China
- Hîncești, Moldova
- Lefkada, Greece
- Maracaibo, Venezuela
- Marousi, Greece
- Oral, Kazakhstan
- Osijek, Croatia
- Radom, Poland

== Notable people ==
=== Academia ===
- Liviu Librescu
- Cristian Pârvulescu
- Nicolae Simache

=== Architecture ===
- Toma T. Socolescu

=== Arts, theater, and film ===
- Geta Brătescu
- Fory Etterle
- Christian Magdu
- Gabriel Popa
- Ruxandra Popa
- Stefan Ramniceanu
- Denis Ștefan
- Traian Trestioreanu

=== Literature ===
- Paul Constantinescu
- Lazăr Șăineanu
- Nichita Stănescu

=== Military ===
- Ilie Crețulescu
- Constantin Stoicescu
- Ioannis Velissariou

=== Music ===
- Andreea Bălan
- Sonny Flame
- Ionel Gherea
- Wanlov the Kubolor
- Nico
- George Nicolescu
- Florin Cezar Ouatu
- Edgar Bischoff
- Tzancă Uraganu
- Grigore Nica

=== Politics ===
- Roberta Anastase
- Petre Bejan
- Mircea Coșea
- Alexandru Dobrogeanu-Gherea
- Ștefan Gheorghiu
- Take Ionescu
- Corneliu Mănescu
- Irate Micescu
- Petre P. Negulescu
- Remus Opriș
- Dan Ioan Popescu
- Sever Voinescu

=== Science ===
- Mihai Ioan Botez
- Sorin Dăscălescu
- Roxana Geambasu
- Basarab Nicolescu
- Ion N. Petrovici

=== Sports ===
- Octavian Belu
- Tamara Costache
- Alexandru Dedu
- Adrian Diaconu
- Leonard Doroftei
- Laurențiu Toma

== Gallery ==
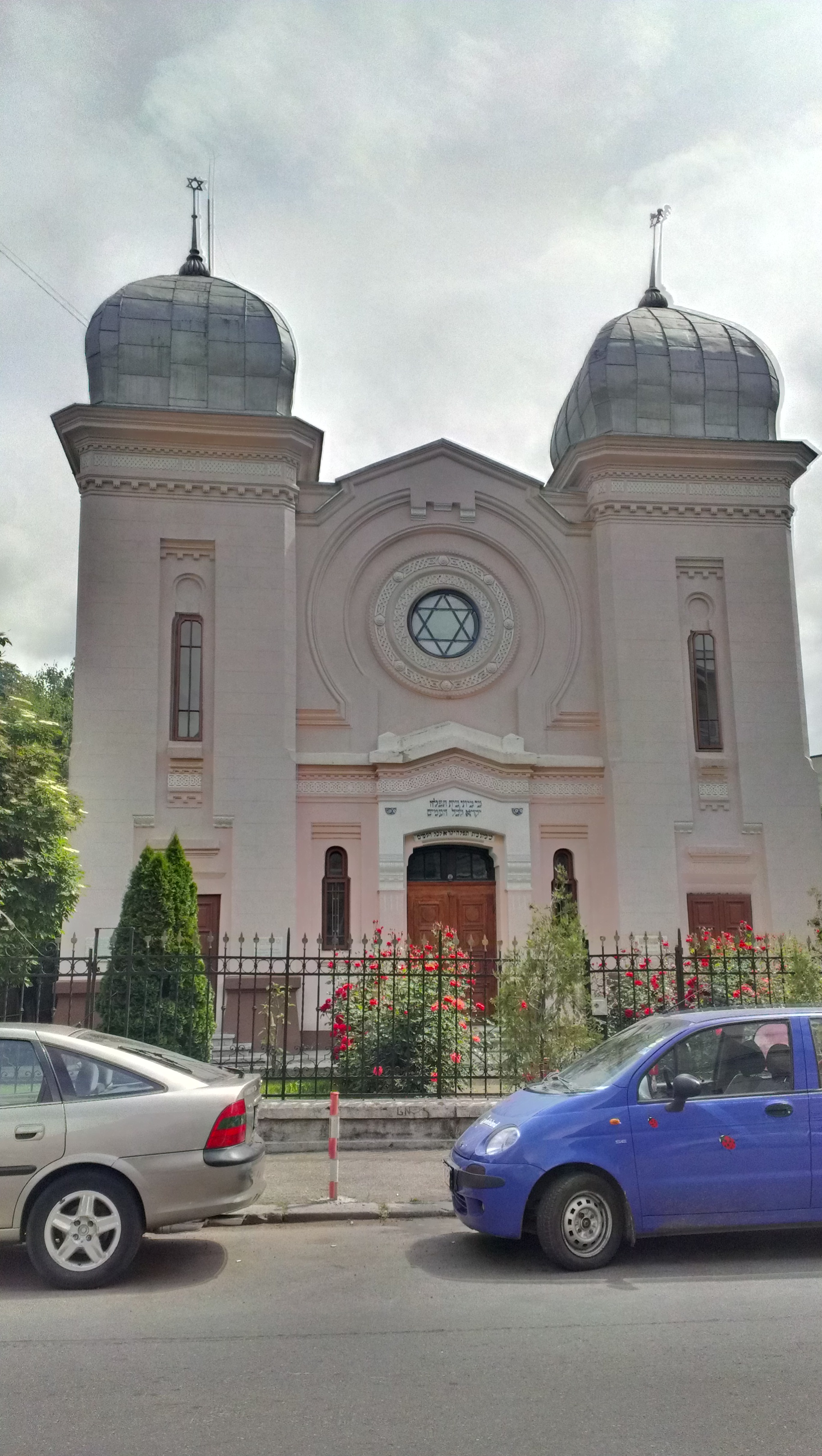
Beth Israel Synagogue, the last standing synagogue in Ploiești

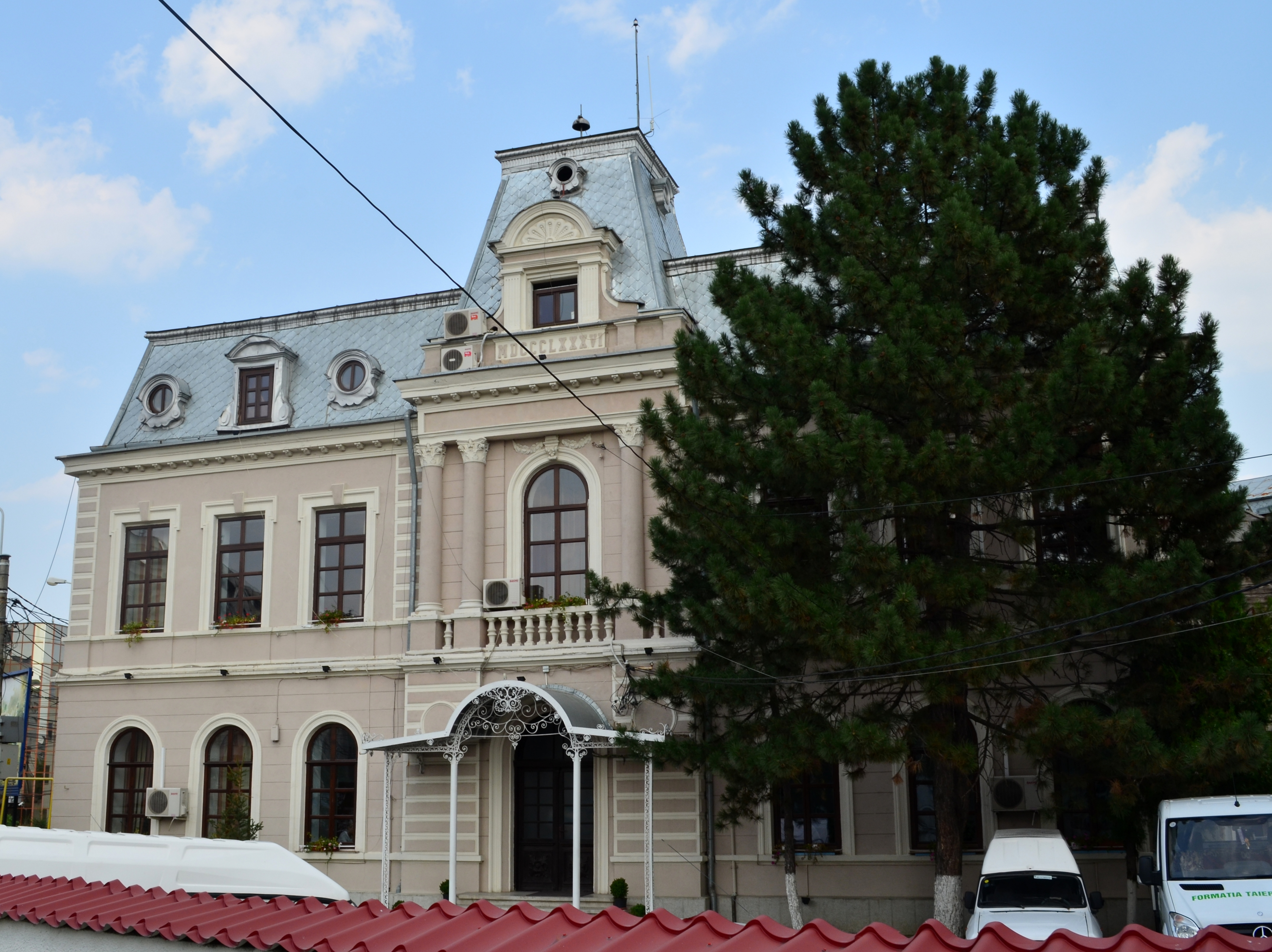
School of Arts and Crafts

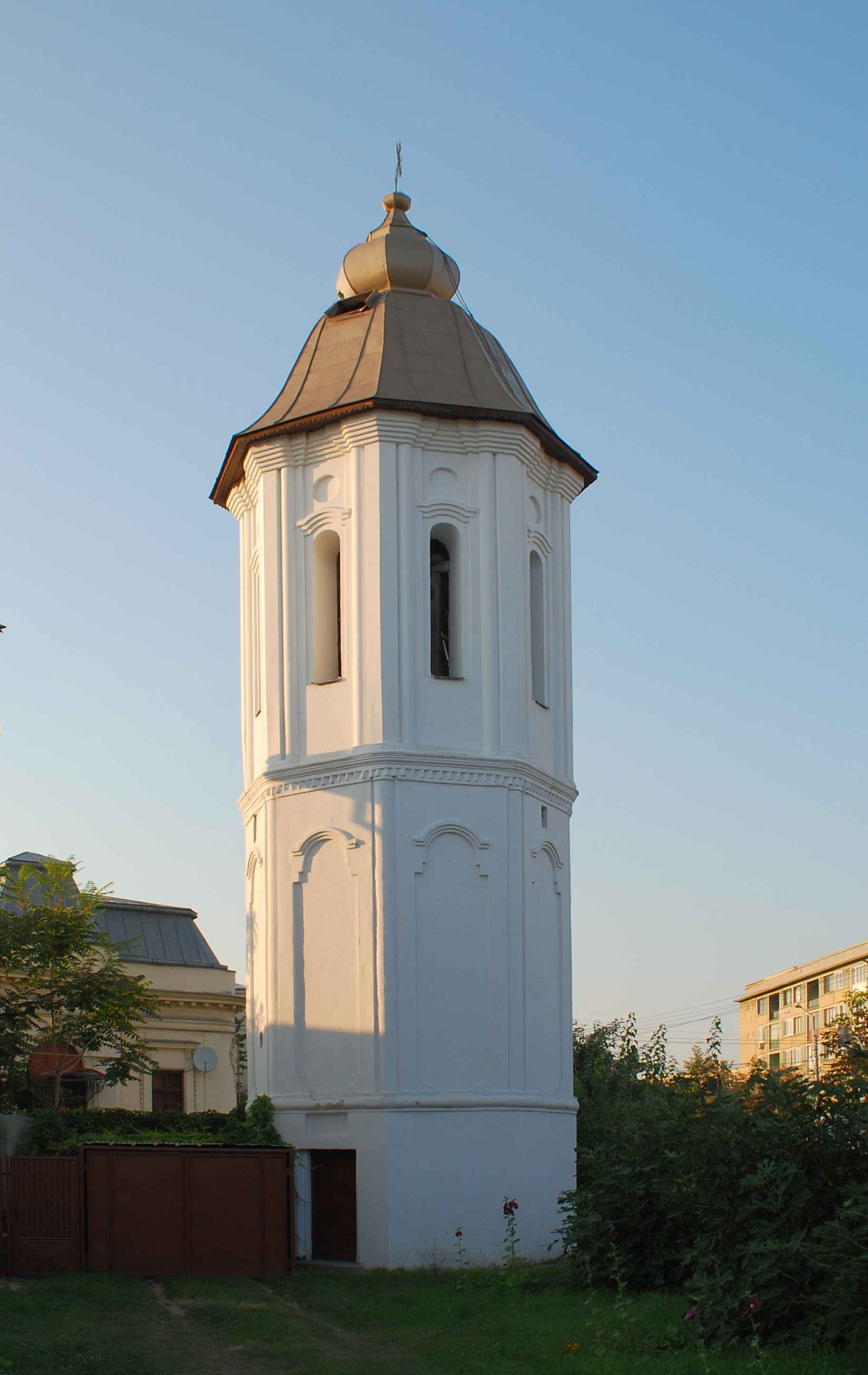
Belfry of the Old St. George Church

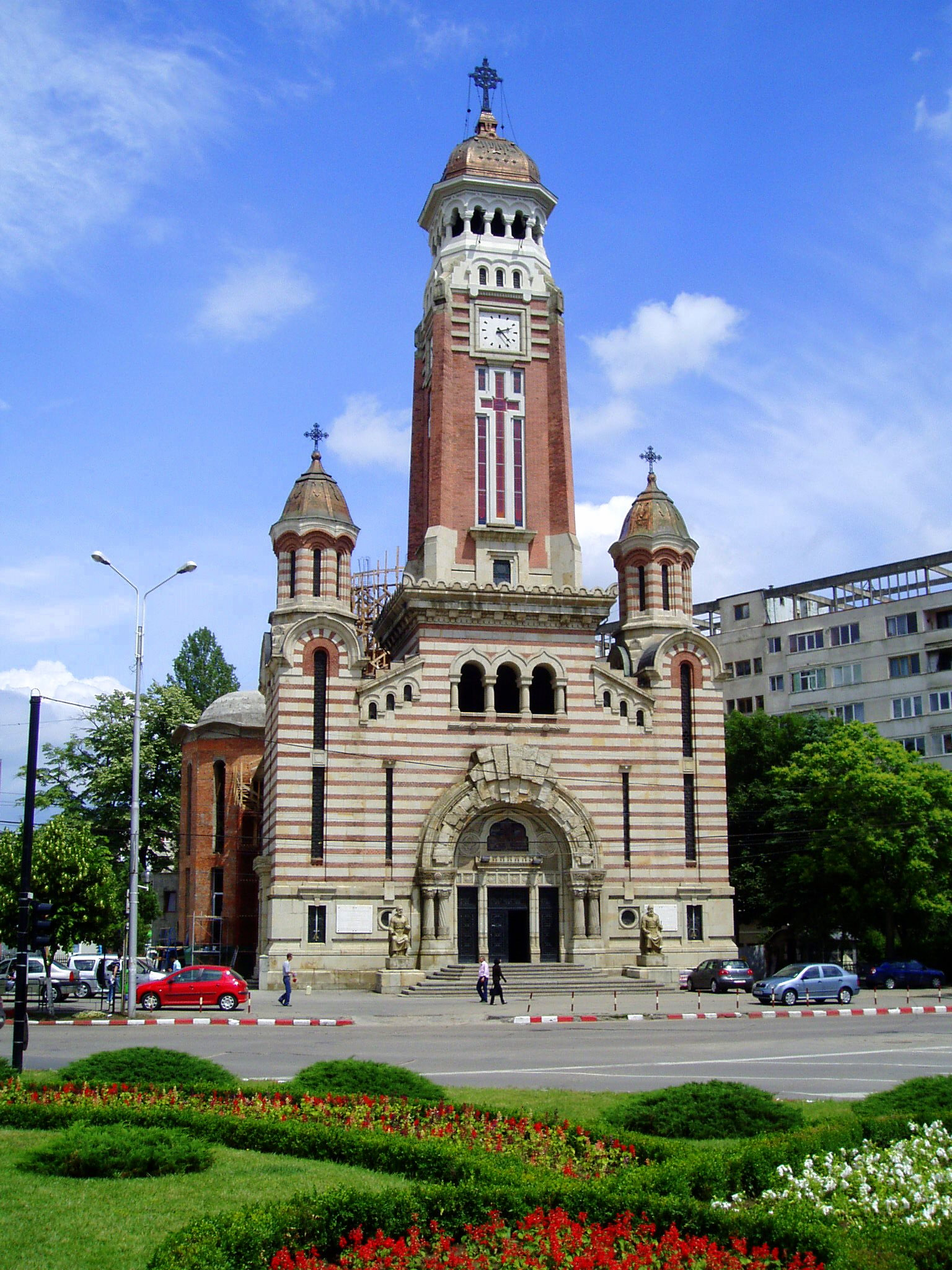
St. John the Baptist Cathedral

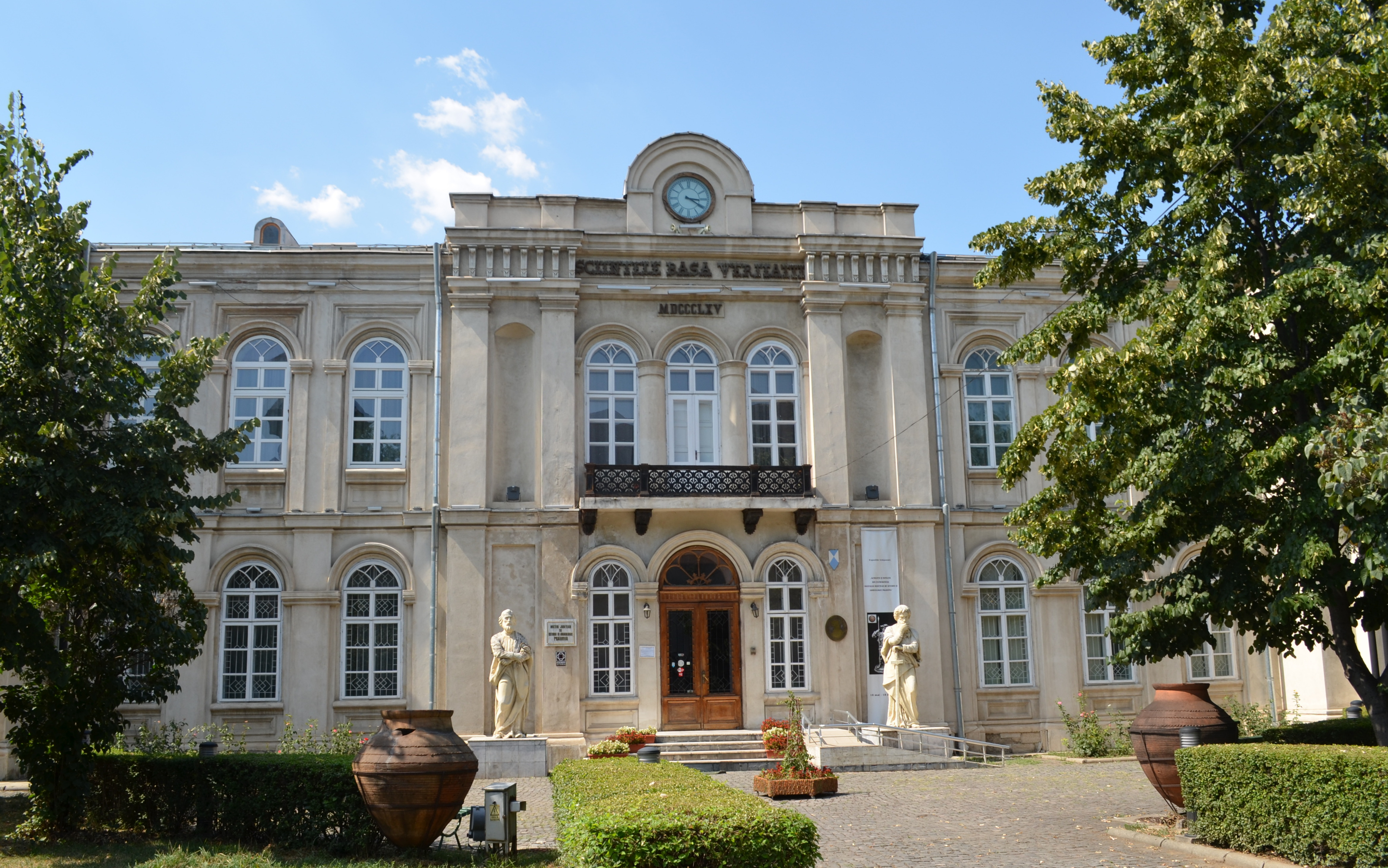
County Museum of History and Archaeology

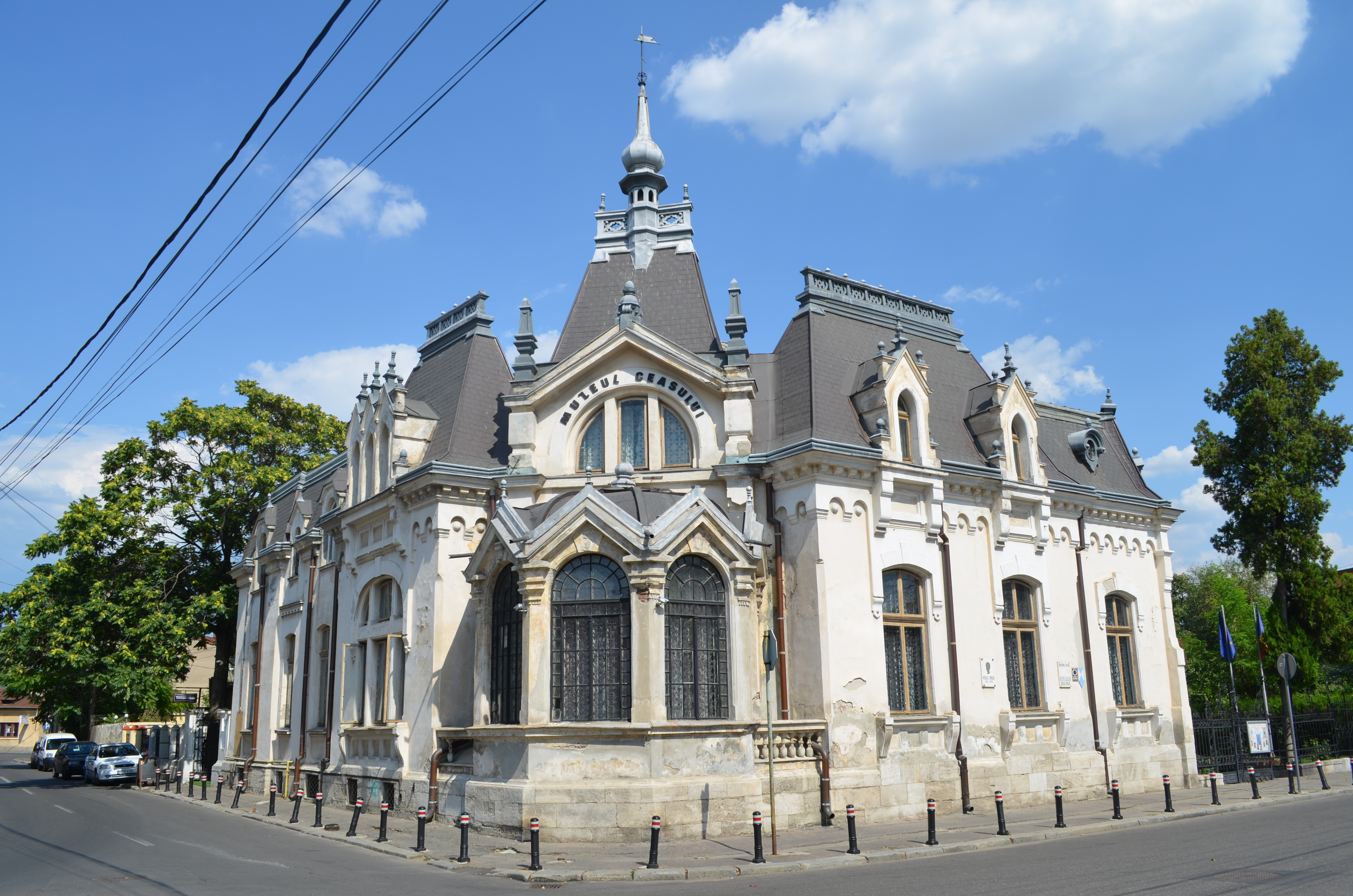
Luca Elefterescu House, currently the "Nicolae Simache" Clock Museum

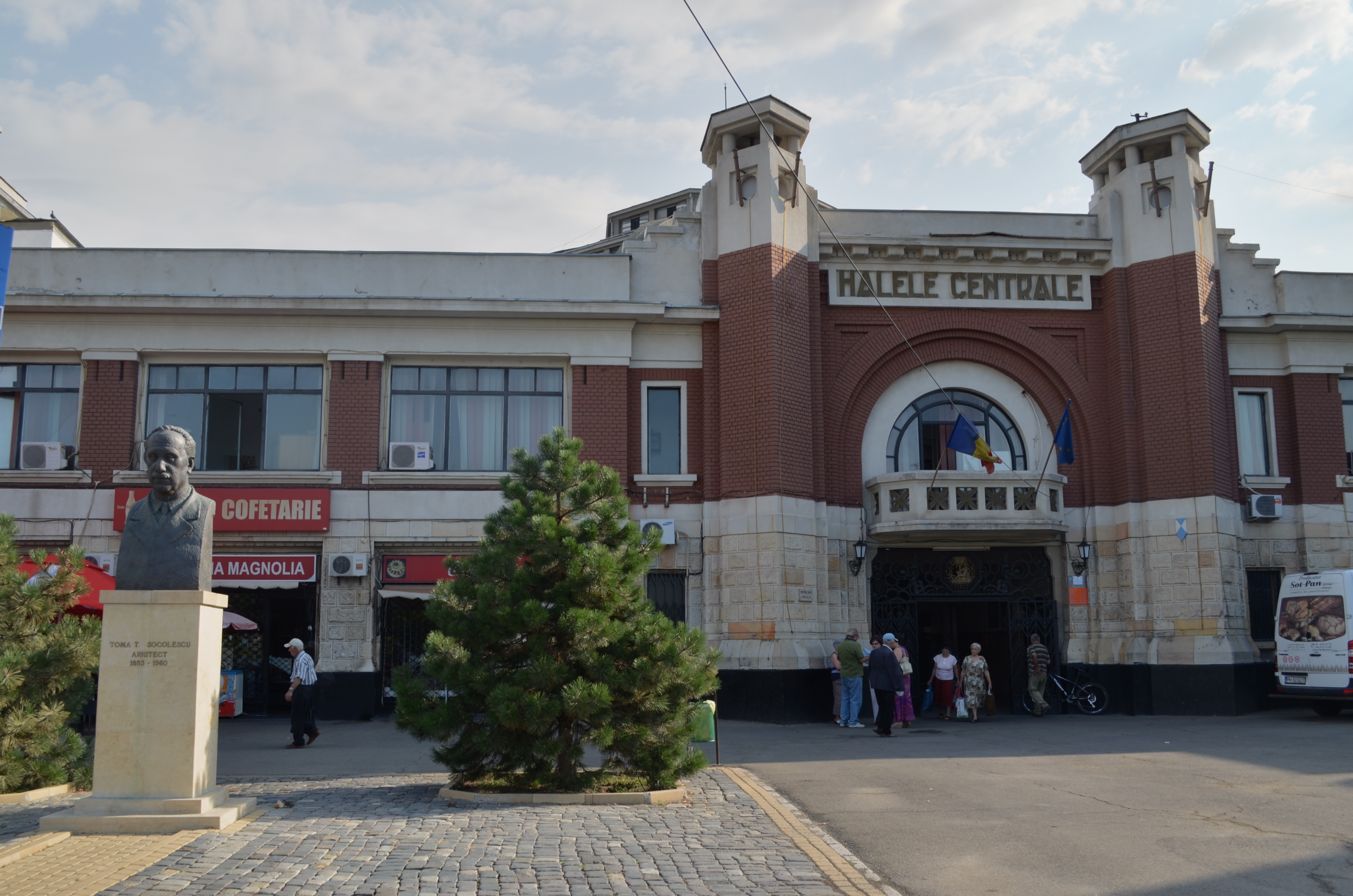
Central Market Hall and the statue of Toma T. Socolescu

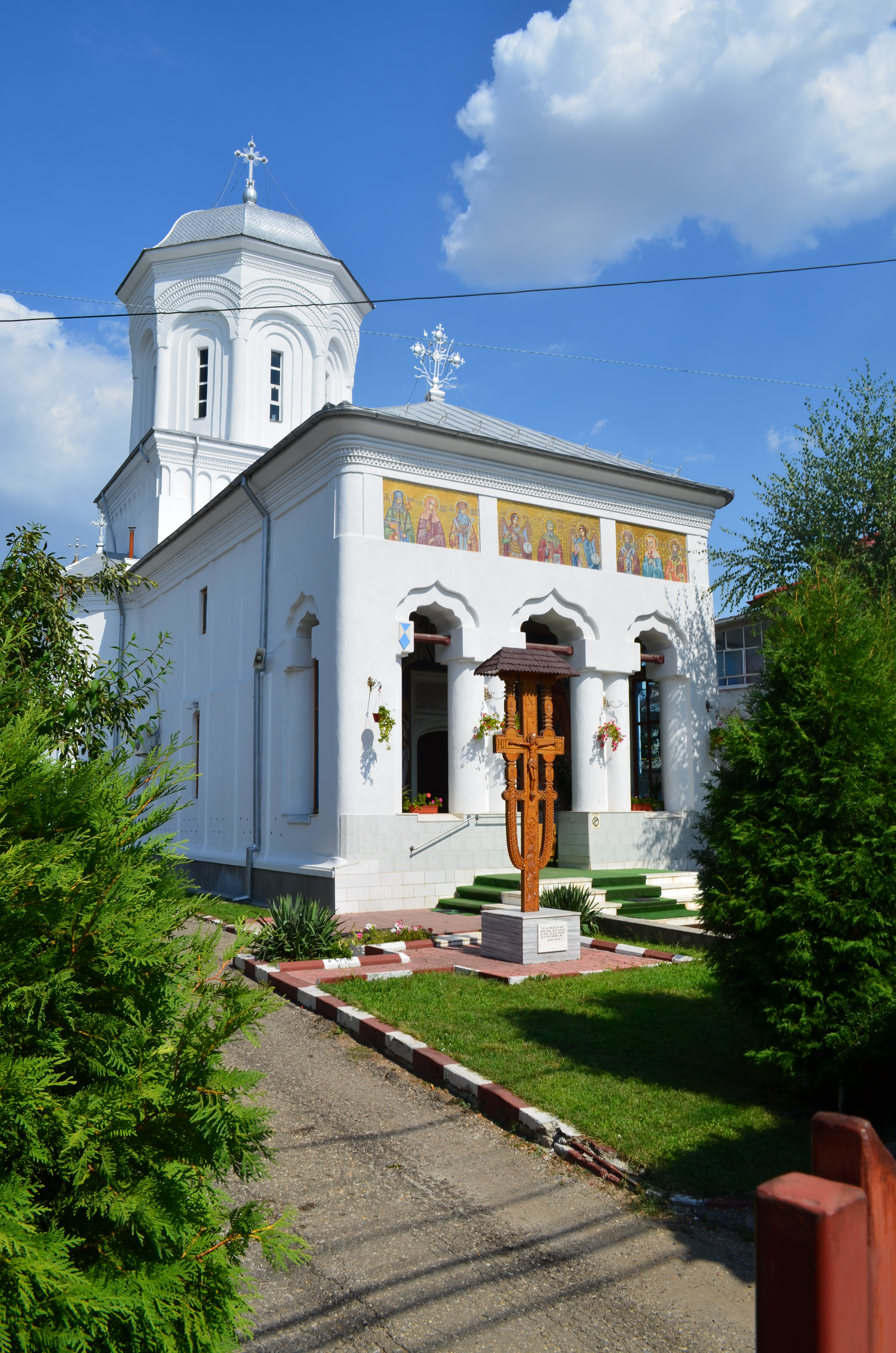
Holy Voivodes Church

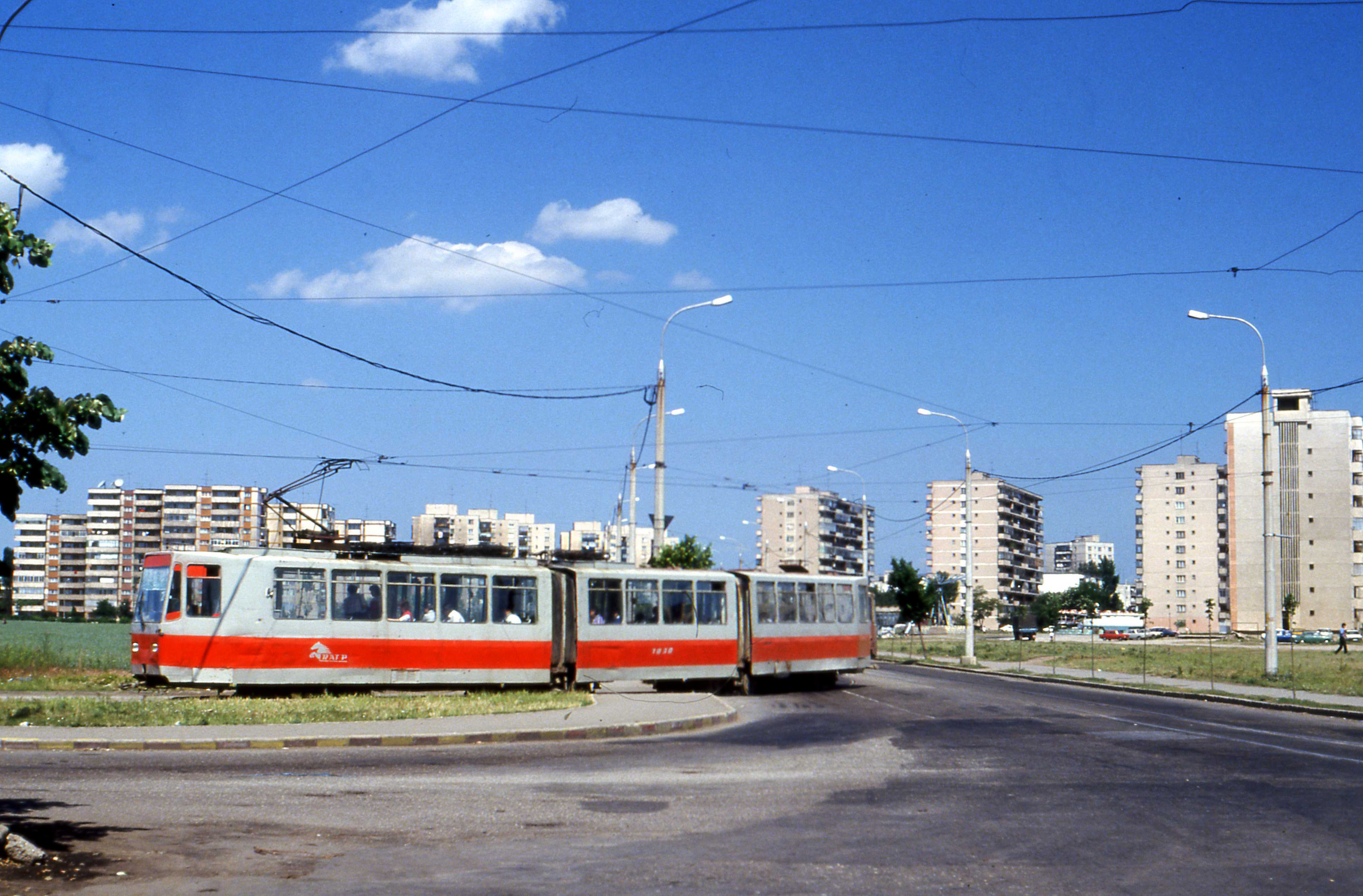
The city's western housing estate in 1994

Ploiești Administrative Palace

== See also ==
- Petrochemical industry in Romania
