= Ploiești metropolitan area =

Ploieşti metropolitan area
- Metropolitan area
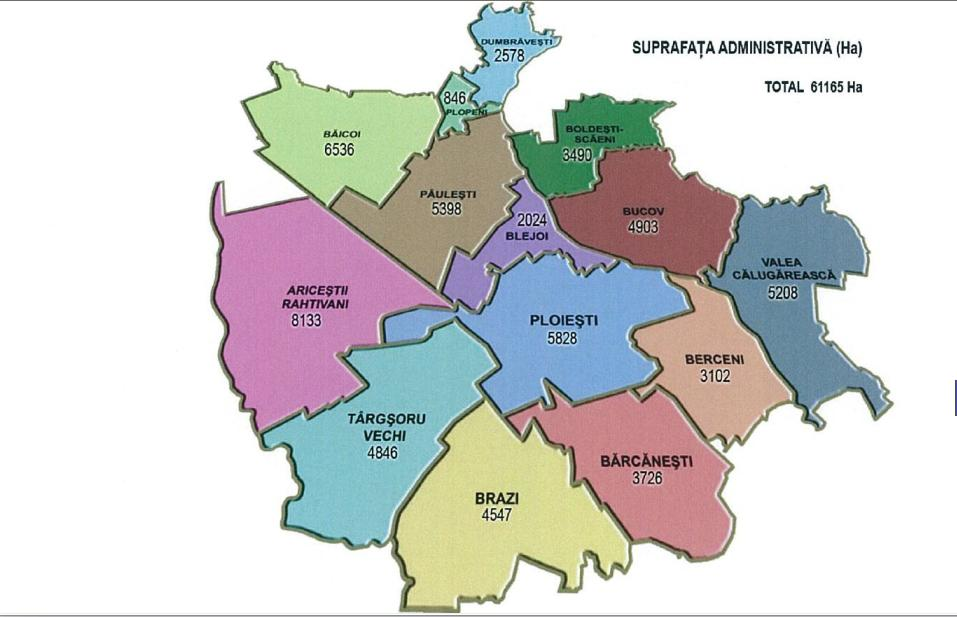
- Country: Romania
- County: Prahova
- Central Municipality: Ploieşti
- Functional: Proposed

Area
  - Total: 478 km^{2} (185 sq mi)

Population (2011 census)
  - Total: 276,279
  - Density: 577/km^{2} (1,490/sq mi)
- Time zone: UTC+2 (EET)
  - Summer (DST): UTC+3 (EEST)
- Postal Code: ??wxyz^{1}
- Area code: + x??^{2}
- ^{1}w, x, y, and z are digits that indicate the street, part of the street, or even the building of the address^{2}x is a digit indicating the operator: 2 for the former national operator, Romtelecom, and 3 for the other ground telephone networks

Ploieşti metropolitan area is a proposed metropolitan area project, launched in 2003.

It will be formed from Ploieşti municipality and surrounding communities: Ariceștii Rahtivani, Bărcăneşti, Berceni, Blejoi, Brazi, Bucov, Păuleşti and Târgșoru Vechi.

As defined by Eurostat, the Ploiești functional urban area has a population of 294,468 residents (as of 2015).
