= Moara Nouă =

Moara Nouă may refer to:

- Moara Nouă, Sălcioara, Dâmbovița, Romania
- Moara Nouă, Berceni, Prahova, Romania
