= Berceni =

Berceni can refer to:

- Berceni, Bucharest, a quarter in Bucharest, Romania
  - Berceni metro station
- Berceni, Ilfov, a commune in Ilfov County
- Berceni, Prahova, a commune in Prahova County
