= Ploiești Art Museum =

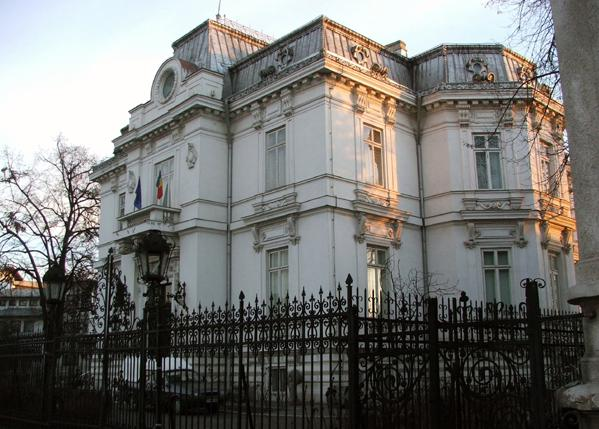
- Established: 1931
- Location: 1 Independenței Boulevard; Ploiești, Prahova County; Romania
- Coordinates: 44.938093°N 26.0255592°E
- Type: Romanian art
- Director: Florin Sicoie
- Architect: Leonida Negrescu
- Website: www.artmuseum.ro

The Ploiești Art Museum, officially the Ion Ionescu-Quintus Prahova County Art Museum (Romanian: Muzeul Județean de Artă Prahova „Ion Ionescu-Quintus”), is an art museum located at 1 Independenței Boulevard, Ploiești, Romania.

== History ==
The museum traces its origins to the Ploiești pinacotheca, established in November 1931 following efforts by a group of local intellectuals. These included the lawyer, politician and art collector Ion Ionescu-Quintus, architect Toma T. Socolescu and historian Dumitru Munteanu-Râmnic; the local authorities also lent their support.

The original institution was evacuated during World War II and re-established as the Ploiești Art Museum in 1955. The current name was adopted in 2005.

The building housing the museum dates to 1885, and was initially the residence of banker and politician Ghiță Ionescu. It is listed as a historic monument by Romania's Ministry of Culture and Religious Affairs.

== Collection ==
The museum comprises a collection of Romanian art from the 19th and 20th century. This includes works by Anton Chladek, Sava Henția, Mișu Popp, Gheorghe Tattarescu, Theodor Aman, Ioan Andreescu, Nicolae Grigorescu, Ștefan Luchian, Theodor Pallady, Gheorghe Petrașcu, Ion Țuculescu, Frederic Storck, Oscar Han, Ion Jalea, Jean Alexandru Steriadi, Ștefan Popescu, as well as other local artists.
