= Christian Magdu =

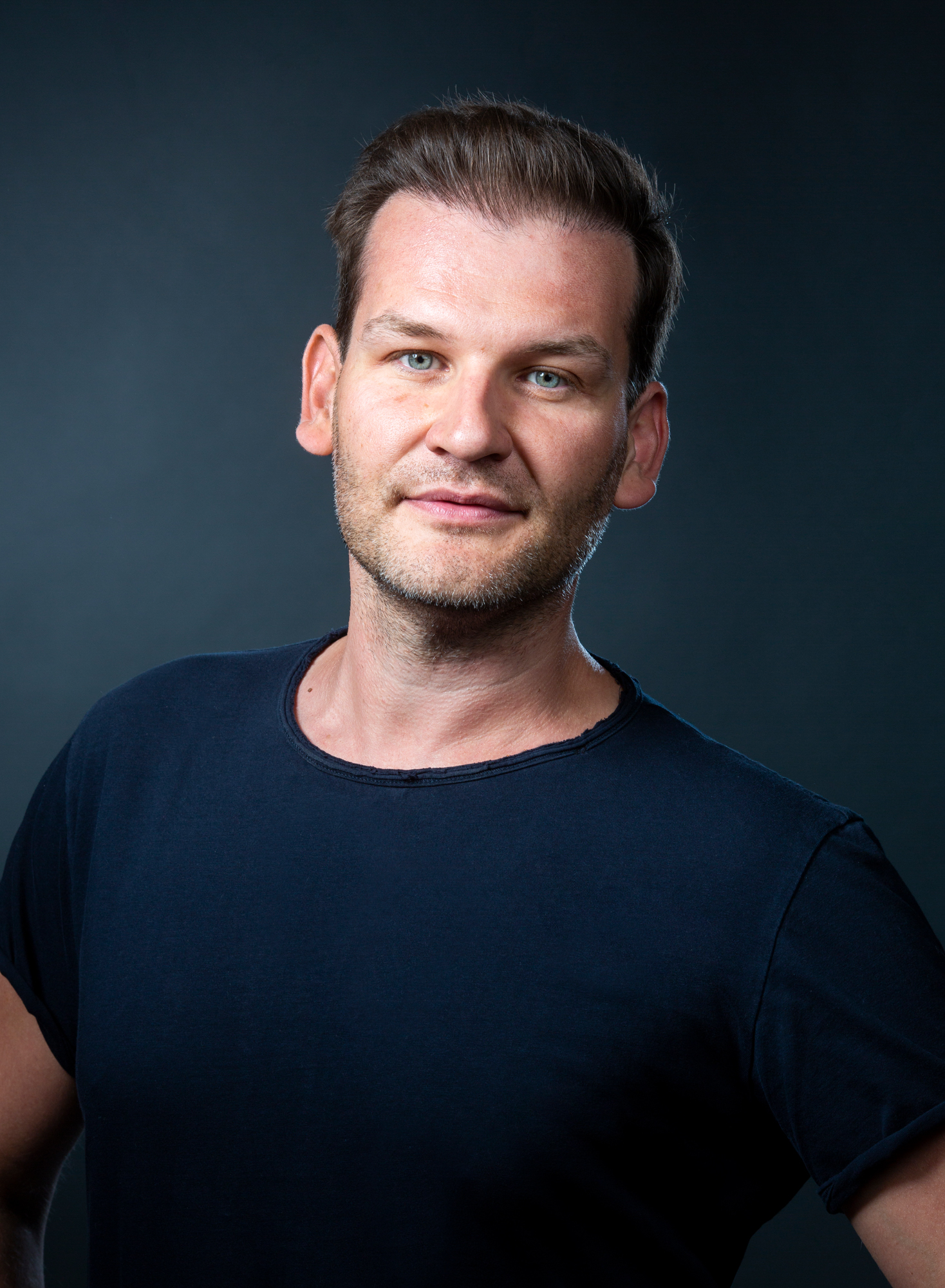
- Born: 15 October 1977 (age 48); Ploiești, Romania
- Years active: 1997–present
- Known for: Francki in We die tonight Yussuf in Gåsmamman; Martin in Starring Maja; Dimitri in Johan Falk: Lockdown and Johan Falk: Slutet
- Spouse: Christin Magdu (m. 2012)
- Website: www.christianmagdu.com

Christian Magdu (born 15 October 1977 in Ploiești, Romania) is a Swedish actor and film producer. He is known for his roles in the Johan Falk film series, the television series Gåsmamman and Exit, as well as serving as producer and starring in the action thriller We die tonight (2025).

== Life and career ==
Magdu was born in Ploiești, but grew up in Sweden in Skövde. He studied science in high school before attending two Swedish theater conservatories: Wendelsberg in 1998 and Skara Skolscen in 2000.

Magdu began working as an actor directly after high school, landing the lead role in Musik i Väst's touring musical theater production Europe 1697. He made his feature film debut in 2002 with the horror film Camp Slaughter. In 2005, he appeared in the short film Never an Absolution (Aldrig en absolution), which won a Crystal Bear at the Berlin International Film Festival. In 2006, Magdu was named "Talent of the Month" by the Swedish film magazine Stardust (later Allt om Film). In 2008, he played a supporting role in the Guldbagge-nominated feature film Starring Maja (Prinsessa).

During the 2010s, Magdu worked in both Swedish and international productions. He had guest roles in American series such as True Blood (2010) and the web series Easy to Assemble (2011). In 2015, he appeared in the final installments of the action series Johan Falk: Johan Falk: Lockdown and Johan Falk: Slutet. In September of the same year, he appeared as a guest at the Comic Con pop culture convention in Malmö.

In the 2020s, Magdu gained recognition for several roles in major Nordic television productions. Between 2021 and 2022, he played the recurring role of the antagonist Yussuf in the fifth and sixth seasons of the Swedish drama series Gåsmamman. In 2023, he guest-starred as Magdalena's brother Andrei in the third and final season of the successful Norwegian drama series Exit.

In recent years, Magdu has expanded his career into film production through the production company Rock Hammer Films, which he runs alongside director Richard Holm and Christin Magdu. In the fall of 2025, the action thriller We die tonight premiered in cinemas, a film in which Magdu both played one of the lead roles and served as sole producer.

Magdu was also one of two co-founders of the website dvdforum.nu in 1999, which was sold to Mediaprovider in December 2006.

== Selected filmography ==
- 2002 – Camp Slaughter
- 2003 – Blood Red Roses (TV series)
- 2004 – The Threat (Hotet)
- 2005 – Never an Absolution (Short)
- 2005 – The Medicine Man (TV mini-series)
- 2006 – Year One
- 2006 – Beck – In the Name of God
- 2006 – Deja Vu
- 2007 – Främmande
- 2007 – Judgement Day (Short)
- 2007 – Zapatos Nuevos
- 2008 – Craig
- 2008 – Dead on Arrival
- 2009 – Starring Maja (Prinsessa)
- 2009 – Syner
- 2009 – Wrongfully Convicted (TV series)
- 2010 – True Blood (TV series)
- 2010 – Lost Tapes (TV series)
- 2011 – Easy to Assemble: Finding North
- 2014 – Anna Blomberg show (TV series)
- 2015 – Johan Falk: Lockdown
- 2015 – Johan Falk: Slutet
- 2020 – The Pro
- 2021–2022 – Gåsmamman (TV series)
- 2023 – Exit (TV series)
- 2025 – We die tonight (Also producer)
