= Coat of arms of Ploiești =

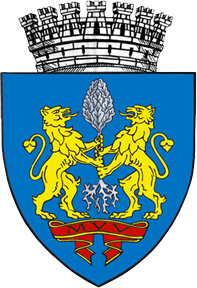
Official design of the coat of arms of Ploiești

The coat of arms of Ploiești consist of a blue shield, loaded with two golden lions, with a red tongue, which sustain a silver, uprooted oak tree. Everything is put on a red scarf with the inscription of M.V.V. initials. The shield is stamped by a mural silver crown made up of seven notched towers.

The meaning of all the elements:

- the representation, took over from Michael the Brave's seal as ruler of the three Romanian countries, reminds about the fact that he founded the city;
- the initials M.V.V. represent the abbreviation of the words Mihai Viteazul-Voievod (Romanian: Michael the Brave-Voivode).
