= Mihai Polițeanu =

Mayor of Ploiești since 2025

Mayor of Ploiești
- Incumbent
- Assumed office 25 October 2024
- Preceded by: Andrei Volosevici

Member of the Chamber of Deputies
- In office December 2020 – October 2024
- Constituency: Prahova County

Personal details
- Born: Mihai Laurențiu Polițeanu; 9 September 1977 (age 49) Ploiești, Romania
- Party: Independent (since 2022)
- Other political affiliations: USR PLUS (2019–2022)
- Education: University of Bucharest (BS); Central European University (MS)
- Profession: Politician, civic activist

Mihai Laurențiu Polițeanu (born 9 September 1977) is a Romanian politician and civic activist who is serving as the mayor of Ploiești since 2024. He was previously a member of the Chamber of Deputies between 2020 and 2024.

Affiliated with the USR PLUS alliance between 2019 and 2022, Polițeanu became an independent and led the civic platform Mișcarea Noi, Ploieștenii, under whose banner was elected mayor of Ploiești in 2024.

== Early life and education ==
Polițeanu was born on 9 September 1977 in Ploiești, Romania. He completed his secondary education at the Mihai Viteazu National College in his native city, graduating in 1996. He then enrolled in the Faculty of Philosophy at the University of Bucharest, from which he graduated in 2000.

In June 2000, following his graduation in Philosophy from the University of Bucharest, he was selected as a participant in the "Summer School – Romania of the 21st Century" program, as reported in Dilema weekly.

Polițeanu pursued further academic training, undertaking postgraduate studies at the Central European University in Budapest. He subsequently studied community law at the Faculty of Law within the University of Bucharest.

== Civic and professional activity ==
Before his civic activism, Polițeanu was first active as a contributor and later listed as an editor with Dreptatea, the official newspaper of the Christian Democratic National Peasants' Party (PNȚCD), in 2001.

Drawing on earlier experience in party-affiliated journalism with Dreptatea in 2001, which was relaunched for the broader public only in 2008 under the leadership of PNȚCD president Marian Miluț, Polițeanu later turned toward civic activism.

=== Coalition for a Clean Parliament ===
In 2004, Polițeanu was first mentioned in the press as the secretary of the "Coalition for a Clean Parliament", a civic initiative formed by 11 NGOs to assess the integrity of candidates running in the legislative elections.

The coalition, coordinated by organizations such as the Romanian Academic Society (SAR) and the Pro Democracy Association, aimed to monitor political parties and expose candidates facing allegations of corruption or incompatibility. Its reports, released before the 2004 elections, sought to encourage voters to reject controversial candidates and to promote higher standards of accountability within Romanian politics.

=== Advisor at the Ministry of Justice ===
Following his academic studies, Polițeanu became actively engaged in the reform of the Romanian justice system. Between 2005 and 2007, he served as an advisor to then Minister of Justice, Monica Macovei, contributing to policies aimed at consolidating the rule of law and combating corruption. Among the institutional reforms supported during this period were the establishment of the Direcția Națională Anticorupție (DNA) and the creation of the Agenția Națională de Integritate (ANI), which aimed to increase transparency and accountability in public office.

=== Program Coordinator at Freedom House Romania ===
Between 2007 and 2009, he held positions as a communications officer within Freedom House Romania and contributed to the Academic Society of Romania's "Coalition for a Clean Parliament", an initiative promoting integrity in electoral processes.

Alongside his civic activity, Polițeanu also published commentary articles. In February 2008, while serving as program coordinator at Freedom House Romania, he authored an article in Dilema Veche titled "Sub asediu: Metaromânia și România proștilor", reflecting on Romania's political climate one year after joining the European Union.

=== Parliamentary Assistant in the European Parliament ===
From 2009 until 2015, he served as an assistant to Macovei in the European Parliament, focusing on legislative and policy issues related to judicial reform and anticorruption measures.

=== Asociația M10 (M10 Association) ===
In early 2015, he became one of the founding members of Asociația M10, a civic NGO initiated by Monica Macovei and other close collaborators. In April 2015, shortly after the launch of the M10 party, he resigned from its structures. Later that year, in November 2015, he was among the founders of the civic movement Inițiativa România (Initiative Romania), together with other former M10 members.

=== Inițiativa România (Initiative Romania) ===
In 2015, Polițeanu co-founded the civic platform Inițiativa România, a movement dedicated to advocating for anticorruption policies and enhancing democratic governance. Through this platform, he participated in numerous public campaigns and civic actions aimed at strengthening accountability within Romanian institutions.

== Political career ==
=== Early career ===
In 2001, while a master’s student, Mihai Polițeanu worked in the parliamentary office of Vasile Lupu (PNȚCD), the author of Law 1/2000 on land restitution. During the same period, he contributed to Dreptatea, the party’s weekly newspaper, where he published articles and interviews. These included pieces such as "Orthodoxy and Christian Democracy are not incompatible" (Observator cultural, May 2001), and an interview with Pedrag Simic on the foreign policy of the former Yugoslavia.

His name also appears among the signatories of a collective statement by the Dreptatea editorial staff, where he was listed as a redactor, published in Cotidianul in July 2001, opposing the dismissal of Vasile Lupu from his position as PNȚCD vice-president.

=== Democratic Liberal Party (PDL) ===
Between 2009 and 2015, Polițeanu worked as a parliamentary assistant to Monica Macovei in the European Parliament. During this period, he was also a member of the Democratic Liberal Party (PDL), although the exact duration of his membership is not clear. In May 2013, Polițeanu published an opinion piece in Kamikaze weekly, where he wrote that he had resigned from the Democratic Liberal Party (PDL), criticizing the party for electoral fraud, lack of transparency, and undemocratic practices.

=== M10 Party ===
The political expression of the M10 Association, the M10 Party, was launched in March 2015 and legally registered later that summer. Polițeanu, co-founder of the M10 Association and president of its Bucharest branch, was involved in the political project of creating and launching the party.

He was presented in the press as the (then) head of the Bucharest branch of the party, a position also explicitly mentioned by political analyst Cristian Ghinea in *Dilema Veche*. However, in early April 2015, he announced his resignation, stating: "I resigned from M10. In the following weeks I will address personal matters long neglected," also adding that he would never return to the organization. At the time of his resignation, several media outlets referred to him as the president of M10’s Bucharest branch.

In a later interview (December 2015 clarification), Polițeanu stated: "I was never part of the M10 Party, I left earlier. I only worked in the association and in the moments preceding the party."

=== Deputy ===
In the 2020 legislative elections, Polițeanu was elected as a deputy representing Prahova County on the list of USR PLUS. During his tenure in the Chamber of Deputies, he promoted measures intended to improve transparency in public administration and to continue reforms in the justice sector.

In 2022, he announced his departure from USR, citing disagreements with the party's local leadership and accusing it of aligning too closely with the National Liberal Party (PNL) at the municipal level. Following this decision, he continued his activity as an independent.

=== Mayor of Ploiești ===
In the context of the 2024 local elections, Polițeanu declared his candidacy for mayor of Ploiești as an independent, supported by the civic association party Mișcarea Noi, Ploieștenii. His platform centred on modernising municipal administration, combating what he characterised as a duopoly of PNL and Social Democratic Party (PSD) control, and promoting transparent governance. In April, his civic association party formed an electoral alliance with the national political party REPER to contest seats in the Prahova County Council.

In June 2024, Polițeanu won the mayorship election with 25.49% of the vote, surpassing both Bogdan Nica (20.06%), the candidate of PNL, and the incumbent mayor Andrei Volosevici (19.39%), who switched from PNL to PSD during his last term. He described his victory as evidence that an anti-system political alternative could successfully challenge established parties in local elections.

Polițeanu was formally sworn into office on 25 October 2024, during a public ceremony in which he stated his commitment to cooperate constructively with the local council while expecting the same level of responsibility towards the city's development.

== Personal life ==
Polițeanu is engaged to Elena, a native of Pașcani, Iași County. He also has a sister residing in Ploiești. Their father, originally from Fântânele, died in 2003.

In September 2025, he married Elena, who is the president of the civic association "Ploiești pentru Oameni" (formerly "Noi, Ploieștenii"), and who had previously been one of the co-founders of the civic platform "Inițiativa România".

== Electoral history ==
=== Mayor of Ploiești ===
Election	Affiliation	Main round		
Election	Affiliation	Votes	Percentage	Position
2024	Independent (supported by Mișcarea Noi, Ploieștenii and REPER)	17,913	25.49%	1st

Political offices
Preceded by Andrei Volosevici	Mayor of Ploiești; 2024–present
