= Jassy–Kishinev offensive =

Jassy–Kishinev offensive may refer to either of the following military offensives carried out by Soviet forces during World War II:

- First Jassy–Kishinev offensive, 8 April–6 June 1944, Soviet failure
- Second Jassy–Kishinev offensive, 20–29 August 1944, Soviet victory
