= Bărcănești, Prahova =

Bărcănești
- Commune
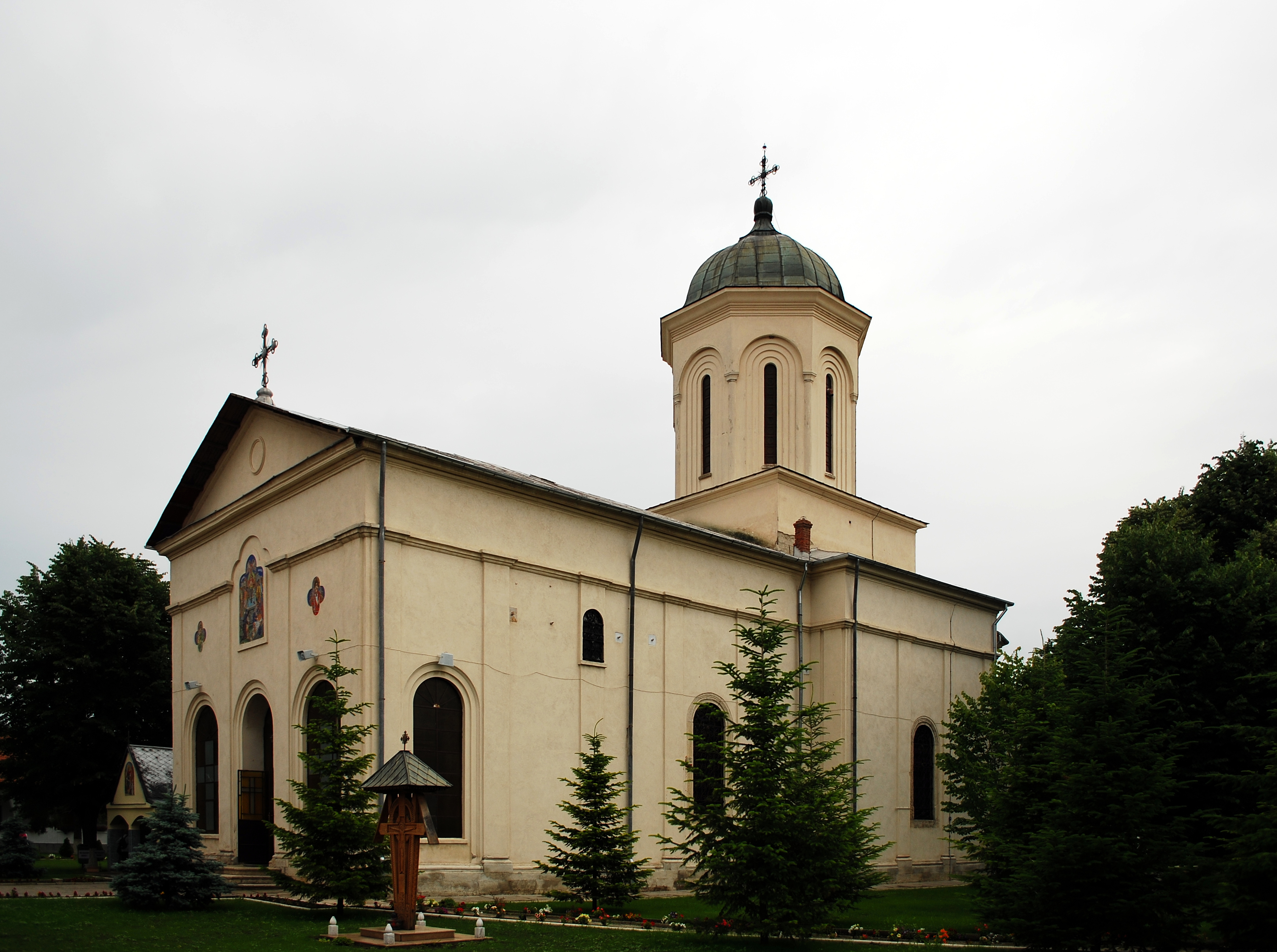
- Ghighiu Monastery

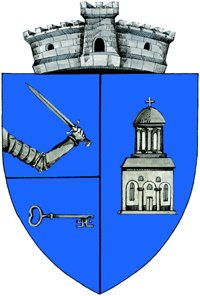
- Coat of arms

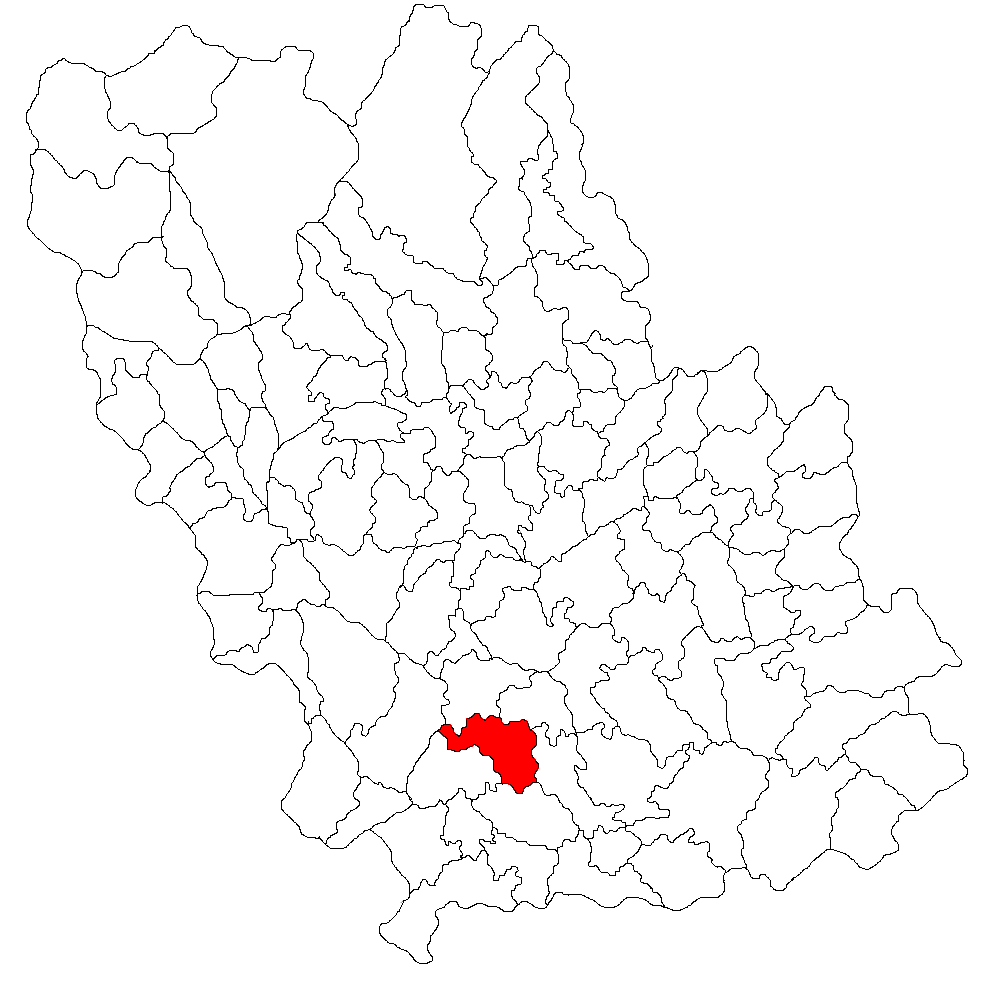
- Location in Prahova County

- Location in Romania
- Coordinates: 44°53′N 26°3′E
- Country: Romania
- County: Prahova

Government
  - Mayor (2020–2024): Gheorghe Dima (PNL)
- Area: 37.25 km^{2} (14.38 sq mi)
- Elevation: 128 m (420 ft)
- Population (2021-12-01): 8,762
  - Density: 235.2/km^{2} (609.2/sq mi)
- Time zone: UTC+02:00 (EET)
  - Summer (DST): UTC+03:00 (EEST)
- Postal code: 107055
- Area code: +(40) 244
- Vehicle reg.: PH
- Website: barcanesti.ro

Bărcănești is a commune in Prahova County, Muntenia, Romania. It is composed of five villages: Bărcănești, Ghighiu, Pușcași, Românești, and Tătărani.

Historical population
Year	Pop.	±%
1992	9,271	—
2002	9,377	+1.1%
2011	9,384	+0.1%
2021	8,762	−6.6%
Source: Census data
