= Berceni, Prahova =

Berceni
- Commune
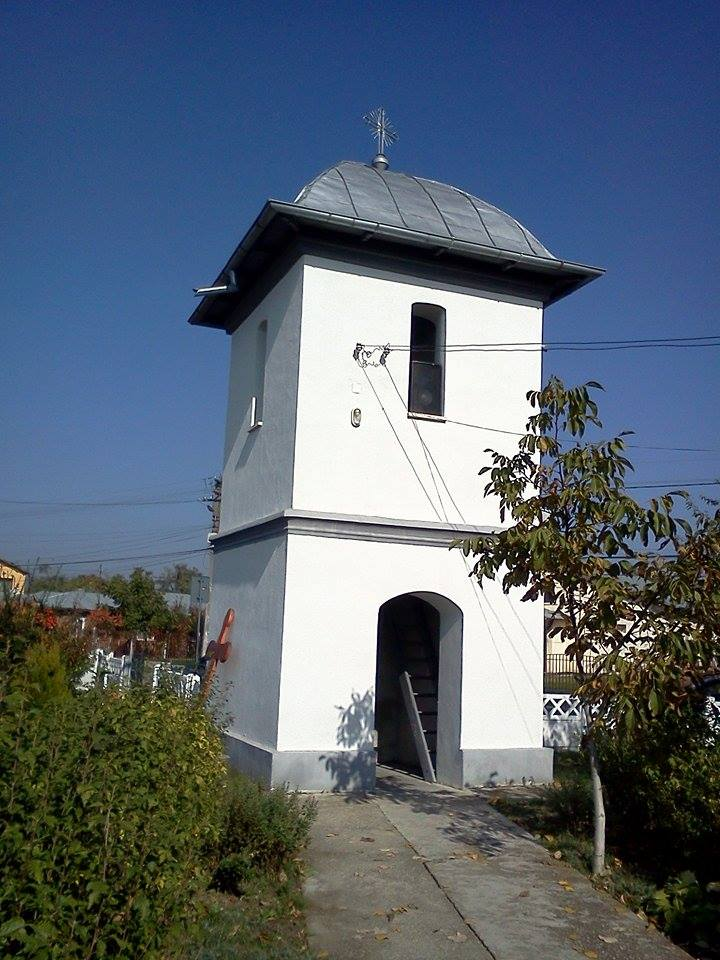
- The bell tower of Saint Nicholas Church in Corlătești

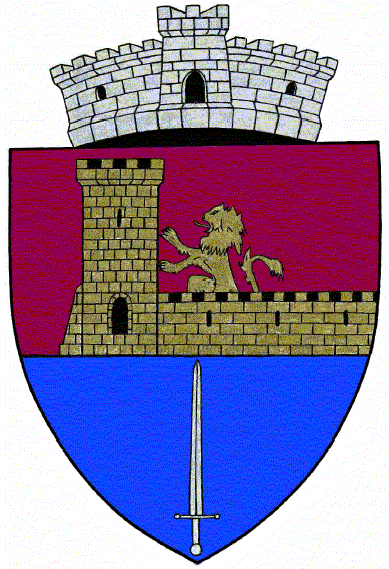
- Coat of arms

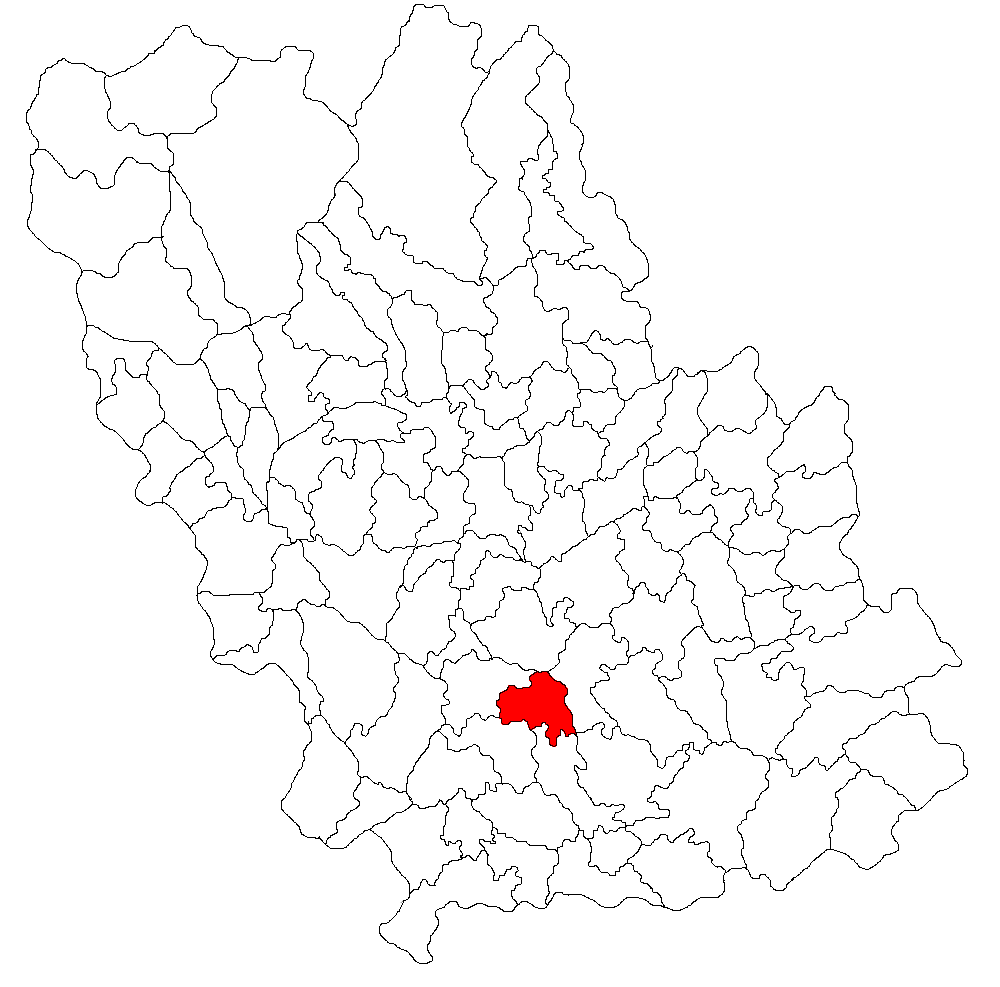
- Location in Prahova County

- Location in Romania
- Coordinates: 44°56′N 26°6′E
- Country: Romania
- County: Prahova

Government
  - Mayor (2024–2028): Cosmina Ramona Pandele (PNL)
- Area: 31.02 km^{2} (11.98 sq mi)
- Elevation: 127 m (417 ft)
- Population (2021-12-01): 5,925
  - Density: 191.0/km^{2} (494.7/sq mi)
- Time zone: UTC+02:00 (EET)
  - Summer (DST): UTC+03:00 (EEST)
- Postal code: 107060
- Area code: +(40) 244
- Vehicle reg.: PH
- Website: www.primariaberceniph.ro

Berceni is a commune in Prahova County, Muntenia, Romania. It is composed of five villages: Berceni, Cartierul Dâmbu, Cătunu, Corlătești, and Moara Nouă.

Historical population
| Year | Pop. | ±% |
|---|---|---|
| 1992 | 5,861 | — |
| 2002 | 6,087 | +3.9% |
| 2011 | 6,186 | +1.6% |
| 2021 | 5,925 | −4.2% |
Source: Census data
