= Matița =

- Location within Romania

Location
- Country: Romania
- Counties: Prahova County

Physical characteristics
- Mouth: Cricovul Sărat
  - location: Coșerele
  - coordinates: 45.0958°N 26.2421°E
- Length: 24 km (15 mi)
- Basin size: 234 km^{2} (90 sq mi)

Basin features
- Progression: Cricovul Sărat→ Prahova→ Ialomița→ Danube→ Black Sea
- Tributaries
  - left: Lopatna
  - right: Tulburea, Sărățel

The Matița is a right tributary of the river Cricovul Sărat in Romania. It flows through the villages Zâmbroaia, Sărari, Curmătura, Matița, Podenii Noi, Sălcioara, Valea Dulce and Popești. It discharges into the Cricovul Sărat near Coșerele. Its length is 24 km (15 mi) and its basin size is 234 km^{2} (90 sq mi).
