= Lopatna =

- Location within Romania

Location
- Country: Romania
- Counties: Prahova County

Physical characteristics
- Mouth: Matița
  - location: Matița
  - coordinates: 45.1403°N 26.1632°E
- Length: 23 km (14 mi)
- Basin size: 85 km^{2} (33 sq mi)

Basin features
- Progression: Matița→ Cricovul Sărat→ Prahova→ Ialomița→ Danube→ Black Sea

The Lopatna (also: Lopanta) is a right tributary of the river Matița in Romania. It discharges into the Matița in the village Matița. It flows through the villages Cărbunești, Surani, Șoimari, Măgura and Matița. Its length is 23 km (14 mi) and its basin size is 85 km^{2} (33 sq mi).
