= Salcia =

Salcia may refer to several places:

== Moldova ==
- Salcia, Șoldănești, a commune in Şoldăneşti district
- Salcia, Taraclia, a commune in Taraclia district
- Salcia, a village in Botnărești Commune, Anenii Noi district

== Romania ==
- Salcia, Mehedinți, a commune in Mehedinţi County
- Salcia, Prahova, a commune in Prahova County
- Salcia, Teleorman, a commune in Teleorman County
- Salcia, a village in Frecăţei Commune, Brăila County
- Salcia, a village in Tisău Commune, Buzău County
- Salcia, a village in Argetoaia Commune, Dolj County
- Salcia, a village in Umbrărești Commune, Galaţi County
- Salcia, a village in Slătioara Commune, Olt County
- Salcia Nouă and Salcia Veche, villages in Ciorăști Commune, Vrancea County
- Salcia, a forced labour camp of Brăila Swamp labor camps in Communist Romania

== Rivers ==
- Šalčia, a river in Lithuania, tributary of Merkys
- Salcia (Ier), a river in Romania, tributary of Ier
- Salcia, a river in Romania, tributary of Bistrița
- Salcia (Ialomița), a river in Romania, tributary of Cricovul Sărat

== See also ==
- Sălcuța (disambiguation)
- Sălcioara (disambiguation)
