= Luca Elefterescu =

Romanian politician and businessman

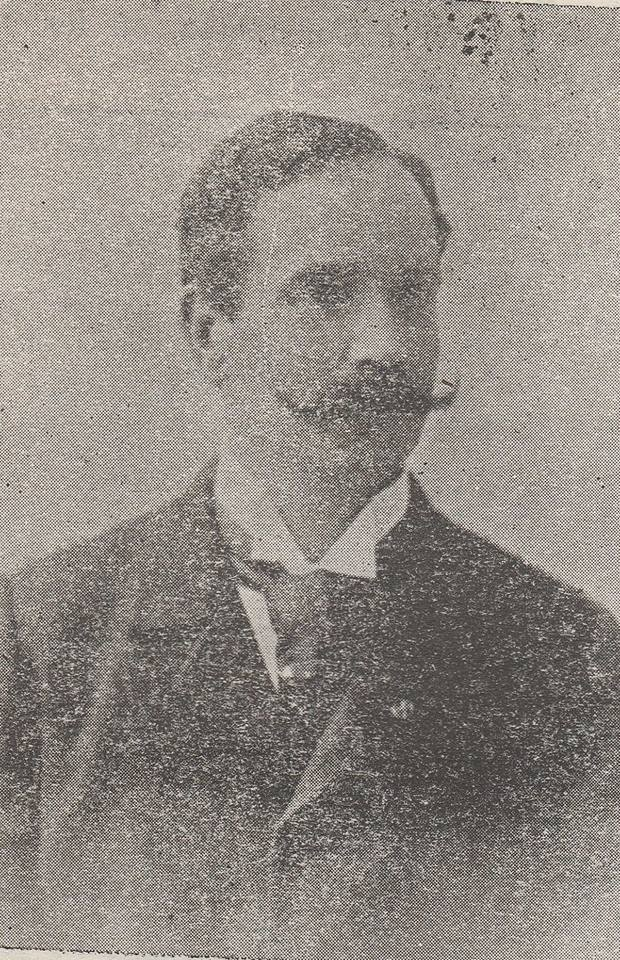
Luca Elefterescu

Luca Elefterescu (1853–October 1925) was a Romanian politician and businessman.

Born in Bucharest, Elefterescu graduated from the University of Bucharest Law Faculty in 1877. Shortly thereafter, he was named deputy prefect in Constanța, a new Romanian territory. He settled in Ploiești in 1883, working as judge and prosecutor at the Prahova County Tribunal. He served four terms running around a decade as Prahova prefect, making him the longest-serving officeholder to date: July 1893-1895, January 1900-1901, December 1904-1907 and December 1910-1914.

As prefect, Elefterescu helped develop the county’s economy, infrastructure and education. In 1895, he laid the cornerstone of the new Saints Peter and Paul High School. He managed to convince the notoriously stingy Gheorghe Grigore Cantacuzino to donate wood from his forests for building 50 bridges. In 1906, he helped introduce a sewage system to Poiești, organizing two lavish banquets upon its completion.

A member of the Conservative Party, Elefterescu became head of its Prahova chapter in 1908. By 1901, he was involved in the local oil industry, becoming a wealthy man. His stately villa houses the Ploiești Clock Museum today. A lover of balls, it appears that Elefterescu hosted the city’s first New Year’s party in his home, in 1903.

Elefterescu also represented Prahova in the Chamber of Deputies prior to World War I. A supporter of the Allies, he fled to Western Moldavia between 1916 and 1918, when Ploiești was occupied by the Central Powers. During his exile, the harsh conditions caused him to fall ill. He died in Bucharest seven years after the war. He had two daughters as well as a son, Gheorghe, who grew up to become a diplomat.
