= Chiojdeanca (river) =

- Location within Romania

Location
- Country: Romania
- Counties: Prahova County
- Villages: Trenu, Chiojdeanca, Apostolache

Physical characteristics
- Mouth: Cricovul Sărat
  - location: Apostolache
  - coordinates: 45.1283°N 26.2630°E
- Length: 12 km (7.5 mi)
- Basin size: 34 km^{2} (13 sq mi)

Basin features
- Progression: Cricovul Sărat→ Prahova→ Ialomița→ Danube→ Black Sea

The Chiojdeanca is a right tributary of the river Cricovul Sărat in Romania. It flows into the Cricovul Sărat in Apostolache. Its length is 12 km (7.5 mi) and its basin size is 34 km^{2} (13 sq mi).
