= Sătucu =

Sătucu may refer to several villages in Romania:

- Sătucu, a village in Săruleşti Commune, Călăraşi County
- Sătucu, a village in Tomşani Commune, Prahova County
