= Ion Luca Caragiale National College =

Ion Luca Caragiale National College (Romanian: Colegiul Național Ion Luca Caragiale) may refer to one of three educational institutions in Romania:

- Ion Luca Caragiale National College (Bucharest)
- Ion Luca Caragiale National College (Moreni)
- Ion Luca Caragiale National College (Ploiești)
