= Salcia (Ialomița) =

- Location within Romania

Location
- Country: Romania
- Counties: Prahova County
- Villages: Salcia

Physical characteristics
- Mouth: Cricovul Sărat
  - location: Sângeru
  - coordinates: 45.1386°N 26.3411°E
- Length: 10 km (6.2 mi)
- Basin size: 26 km^{2} (10 sq mi)

Basin features
- Progression: Cricovul Sărat→ Prahova→ Ialomița→ Danube→ Black Sea

The Salcia is a right tributary of the river Cricovul Sărat in Romania. It flows into the Cricovul Sărat in Sângeru. Its length is 10 km (6.2 mi) and its basin size is 26 km^{2} (10 sq mi).
