= Alexandru Antemireanu =

Romanian poet (1877 - 1910)

Alexandru Antemireanu (born Alexandru Damian; August 1, 1877 – June 29, 1910) was a Romanian poet, prose writer and literary critic.

Born in Tomșani, Prahova County, his father Antemir Damian was a Romanian Orthodox priest. He was sent to nearby Urlați for primary school, where his surname was changed after his father's first name. He attended high school in Ploiești, followed by the University of Bucharest's faculty of literature and philosophy, where he audited courses by Titu Maiorescu. Antemireanu became intensely involved in newspaper writing in order to earn a living, forcing him to abandon his studies. His first published work appeared in the daily newspaper Țara in 1895. He drew notice from Nicolae Filipescu, to whose conservative newspaper Epoca he migrated. There, he edited the literary section before becoming editing secretary. After furthering his education in Paris and Munich, Antemireanu returned home and returned to journalism at the newspapers Apărarea națională, Românul and Conservatorul, editing the literary features. He edited Epoca literară and, in 1898, founded Floare albastră magazine with Ștefan Octavian Iosif.

Antemireanu contributed political articles, literary feuilletons, translations, verses, sketches, short stories, literary and dramatic news and reviews to Convorbiri Literare, Litere – științe – arte, Noua revistă română, Povestea vorbei, Revista literară, Revista poporului, Revista ilustrată and Secolul. He signed using various pen names: Lys, Hyalmar, Elvira Santorino, Alan Damian, Demeter, Emir, Lysandros, Pollux, Seraficus, Ulys, Vindex, Zara, Zaratustra. Beset by material difficulties and burdened by the duties of newspaper work, Antemireanu lived in the bohemian milieu of Bucharest coffeehouses; he died young, of tuberculosis. He translated from Henrik Ibsen, wrote poetry and a novel, Din vremea lui Căpitan Costache, which appeared in 1937. Initially serialized in 1898, it deals with the Wallachian Revolution of 1848. Moderate in its politics, the book shows sympathy for Prince Gheorghe Bibescu and contrasts Ion Heliade Rădulescu with the more liberal revolutionaries. In his literary criticism, which included the 1905 volume Încercări critice. Junimea și roadele ei, Antemireanu attempted to break new ground.
