= Tomșani =

Tomșani may refer to several places in Romania:

- Tomșani, Prahova, a commune in Prahova County
- Tomșani, Vâlcea, a commune in Vâlcea County
- Tomșani, a village in Costeștii din Vale Commune, Dâmbovița County
