= Lapoș =

- Commune
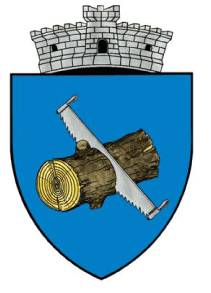
- Coat of arms

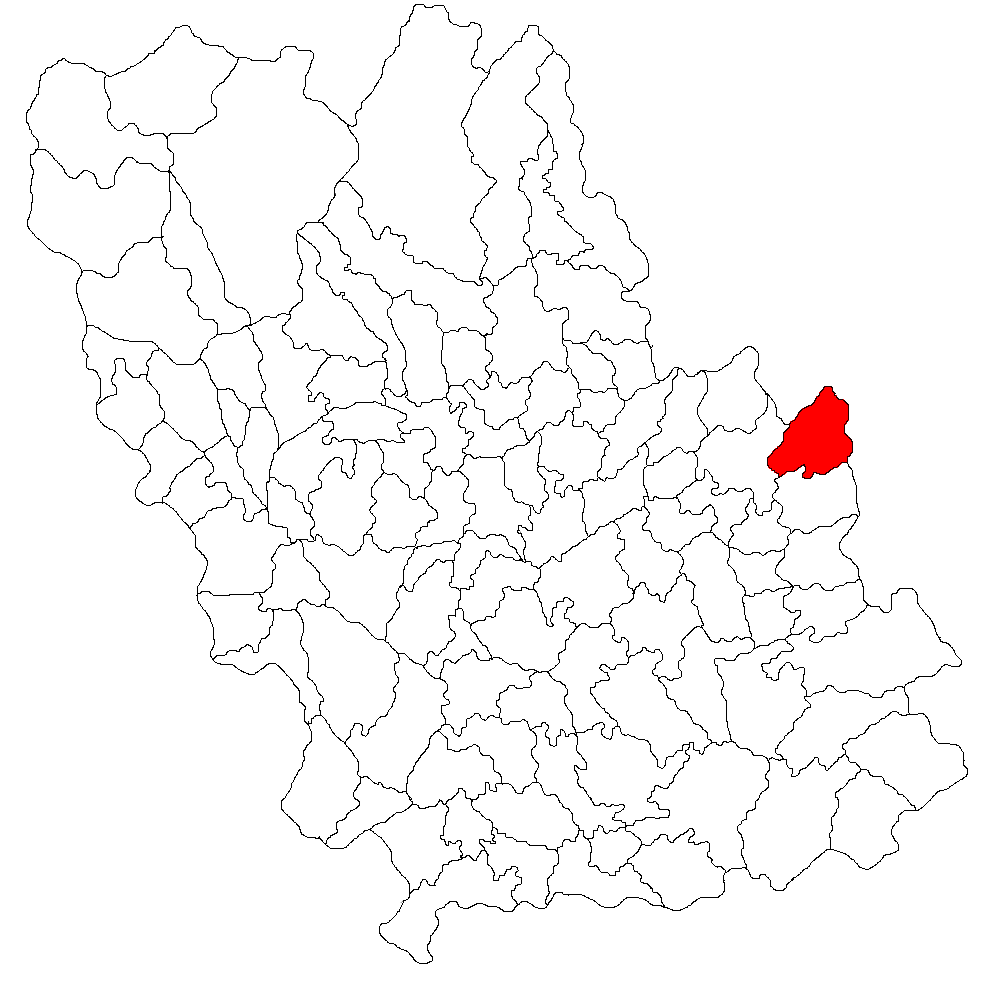
- Location in Prahova County

- Location in Romania
- Coordinates: 45.1366°N 26.3446°E
- Country: Romania
- County: Prahova

Government
  - Mayor (2024–2028): Viorel Barbu (PSD)
- Area: 29.67 km^{2} (11.46 sq mi)
- Elevation: 328 m (1,076 ft)
- Population (2021-12-01): 983
  - Density: 33/km^{2} (86/sq mi)
- Time zone: EET/EEST (UTC+2/+3)
- Postal code: 107335
- Area code: +(40) 244
- Vehicle reg.: PH
- Website: www.primarialapos.ro

Lapoș is a commune in Prahova County, Muntenia, Romania. It is composed of four villages: Glod, Lapoș, Lăpoșel, and Pietricica.

The commune is located in the eastern part of the county, 46 km (29 mi) northeast of the county seat, Ploiești, on the border with Buzău County. The rivers Cricovul Sărat and Nișcov have their source nearby. The county road DJ235 connects Lapoș to the Sângeru commune.

On these lands, Doamna Neaga, the wife of Mihnea Turcitul, Voivode of Wallachia between 1577 and 1583, and again from 1585 to 1591, had their gardens and orchards.

The Lapoș oil field is located on the territory of the commune.

Historical population
Year	Pop.	±%
2002	1,247	—
2011	1,229	−1.4%
2021	983	−20.0%
Source: Census data
