= Sălcioara =

Sălcioara may refer to several places in Romania:

- Sălcioara, Dâmbovița, a commune in Dâmboviţa County
- Sălcioara, Ialomița, a commune in Ialomiţa County
- Sălcioara, a village in Ghergheasa Commune, Buzău County
- Sălcioara, a village in Curcani Commune, Călăraşi County
- Sălcioara, a village in Mătăsaru Commune, Dâmboviţa County
- Sălcioara, a village in Podenii Noi Commune, Prahova County
- Sălcioara, a village in Jurilovca Commune, Tulcea County
- Sălcioara, a village in Banca, Vaslui Commune, Vaslui County

== See also ==
- Salcia (disambiguation)
- Sălcuța (disambiguation)
