= Cricovul Sărat =

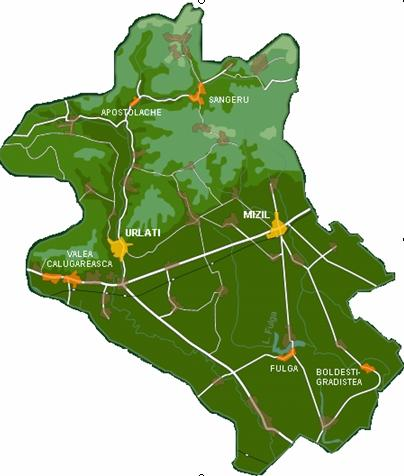
- Cricovul Sărat river basin

- Location within Romania

Location
- Country: Romania
- Counties: Buzău, Prahova, Ialomița

Physical characteristics
- Source: Poiana Hoților Hill
- Mouth: Prahova
  - location: Adâncata
  - coordinates: 44.7626°N 26.4242°E
- Length: 94 km (58 mi)
- Basin size: 809 km^{2} (312 sq mi)

Basin features
- Progression: Prahova→ Ialomița→ Danube→ Black Sea

The Cricovul Sărat is a left tributary of the river Prahova in Romania. It discharges into the Prahova in Adâncata. It flows through the villages Buda Crăciunești, Sângeru, Apostolache, Gornet-Cricov, Iordăcheanu, Urlați, Arioneștii Noi, Albești-Paleologu, Cioranii de Jos, Vadu Parului, Albesti-muru, Cioceni and Adâncata. Its length is 94 km (58 mi) and its basin size is 809 km^{2} (312 sq mi).

== Tributaries ==
The following rivers are tributaries to the river Cricovul Sărat (from source to mouth):

- Left: Lapoș, Sărățica, Crâng
- Right: Salcia, Chiojdeanca, Matița, Vărbila
