= Curmătura =

Curmătura or Curmătură („mountain saddle“ in Romanian) may refer to several villages in Romania:

- Curmătură, a village in Lupșa Commune, Alba County
- Curmătura, a village in the town of Nehoiu, Buzău County
- Curmătura, a village in Sichevița Commune, Caraş-Severin County
- Curmătura, a village in Giurgița Commune, Dolj County
- Curmătura, a village in Păcureți Commune, Prahova County

== Mountain cabins ==
- Cabana Curmătura in Piatra Craiului Mountains

== See also ==
- Curmătura River (disambiguation)
