= Vărbila =

- Location within Romania

Location
- Country: Romania
- Counties: Prahova County
- Villages: Vărbila

Physical characteristics
- Mouth: Cricovul Sărat
  - coordinates: 45.0274°N 26.2331°E
- Length: 10 km (6.2 mi)
- Basin size: 17 km^{2} (6.6 sq mi)

Basin features
- Progression: Cricovul Sărat→ Prahova→ Ialomița→ Danube→ Black Sea

The Vărbila is a right tributary of the river Cricovul Sărat in Romania. It flows into the Cricovul Sărat in Jercălăi. Its length is 10 km (6.2 mi) and its basin size is 17 km^{2} (6.6 sq mi).
