= Mireșu =

Mireșu may refer to several places in Romania:

- Mireșu Mare, a commune in Maramureș County
- Mireșu Mare and Mireșu Mic, villages in Sângeru Commune, Prahova County
