= Chiojdeanca =

- Commune
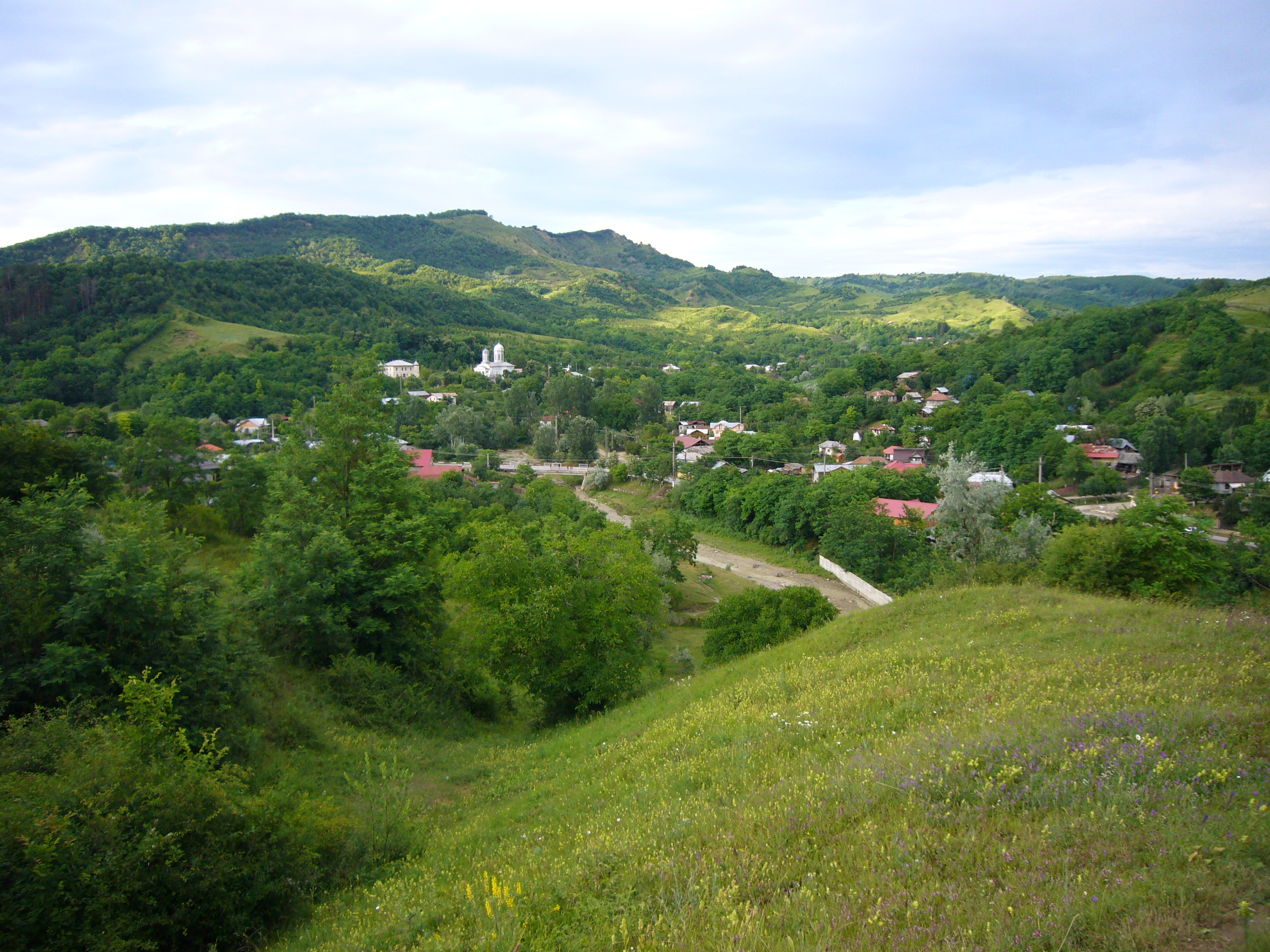
- View of Chiojdeanca

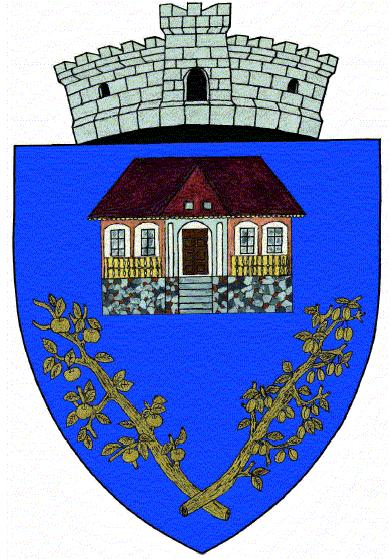
- Seal

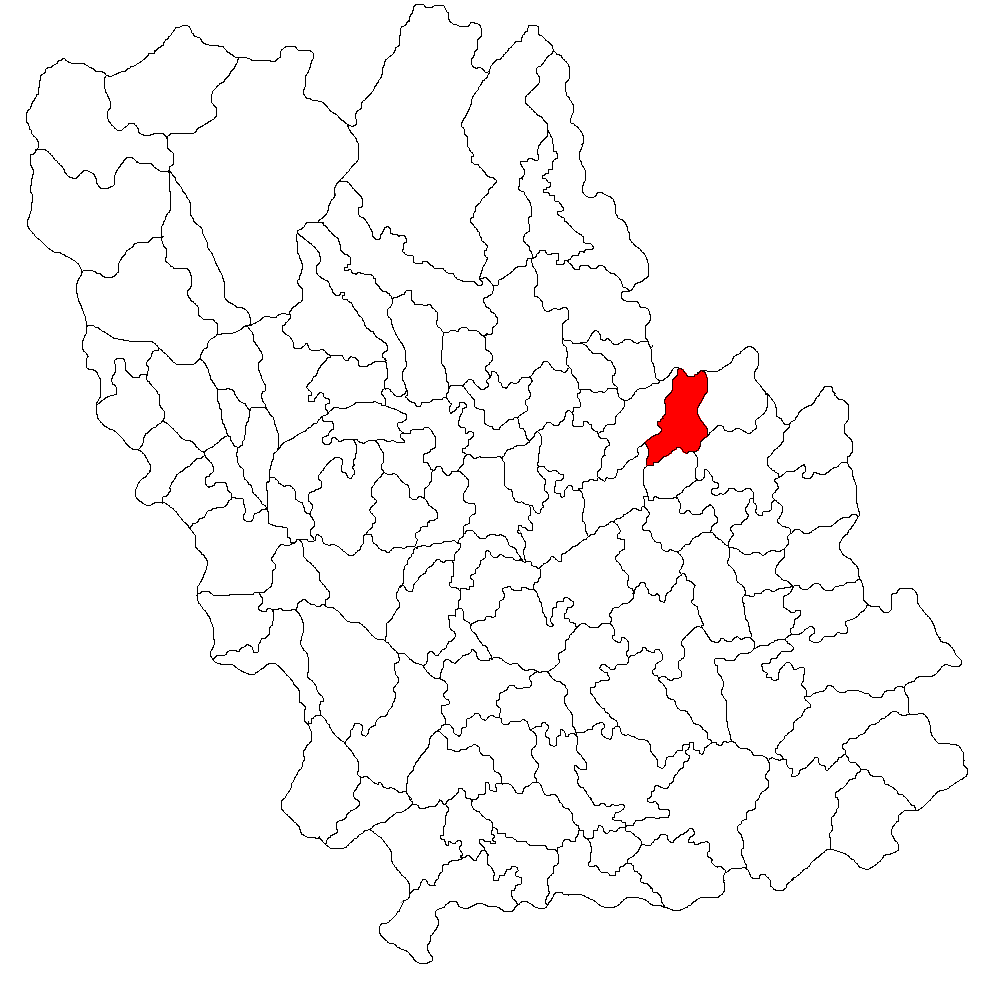
- Location in Prahova County

- Location in Romania
- Coordinates: 45°10′N 26°16′E
- Country: Romania
- County: Prahova

Government
  - Mayor (2020–2024): Gheorghe Baba-Iana (PSD)
- Area: 31.48 km^{2} (12.15 sq mi)
- Elevation: 210 m (690 ft)
- Population (2021-12-01): 1,510
  - Density: 48.0/km^{2} (124/sq mi)
- Time zone: UTC+02:00 (EET)
  - Summer (DST): UTC+03:00 (EEST)
- Postal code: 107150
- Area code: +(40) 244
- Vehicle reg.: PH
- Website: cjph.ro/localitate/chiojdeanca/

Chiojdeanca is a commune in Prahova County, Muntenia, Romania. It is composed of three villages: Chiojdeanca, Nucet, and Trenu.

The commune lies on both banks of the river Chiojdeanca, surrounded by the Sub Carpathian hills. It is located in the eastern part of the county, on the border with Buzău County, at a distance of 43 km (27 mi) from the county seat, Ploiești, and 60 km (37 mi) from Buzău.

Historical population
| Year | Pop. | ±% |
|---|---|---|
| 1900 | 2,598 | — |
| 1965 | 2,789 | +7.4% |
| 1975 | 2,461 | −11.8% |
| 1992 | 1,954 | −20.6% |
| 2002 | 1,812 | −7.3% |
| 2011 | 1,728 | −4.6% |
| 2021 | 1,510 | −12.6% |
Source: Census data

== Natives ==
- Andrei Rădulescu (1880–1959), jurist, President of the High Court of Cassation and Justice from 1938 to 1940, President of the Romanian Academy from 1946 to 1948.
- Eugen Simion (1933–2022), literary critic and historian.
