= Andrei Rădulescu =

Romanian jurist (1880–1959)

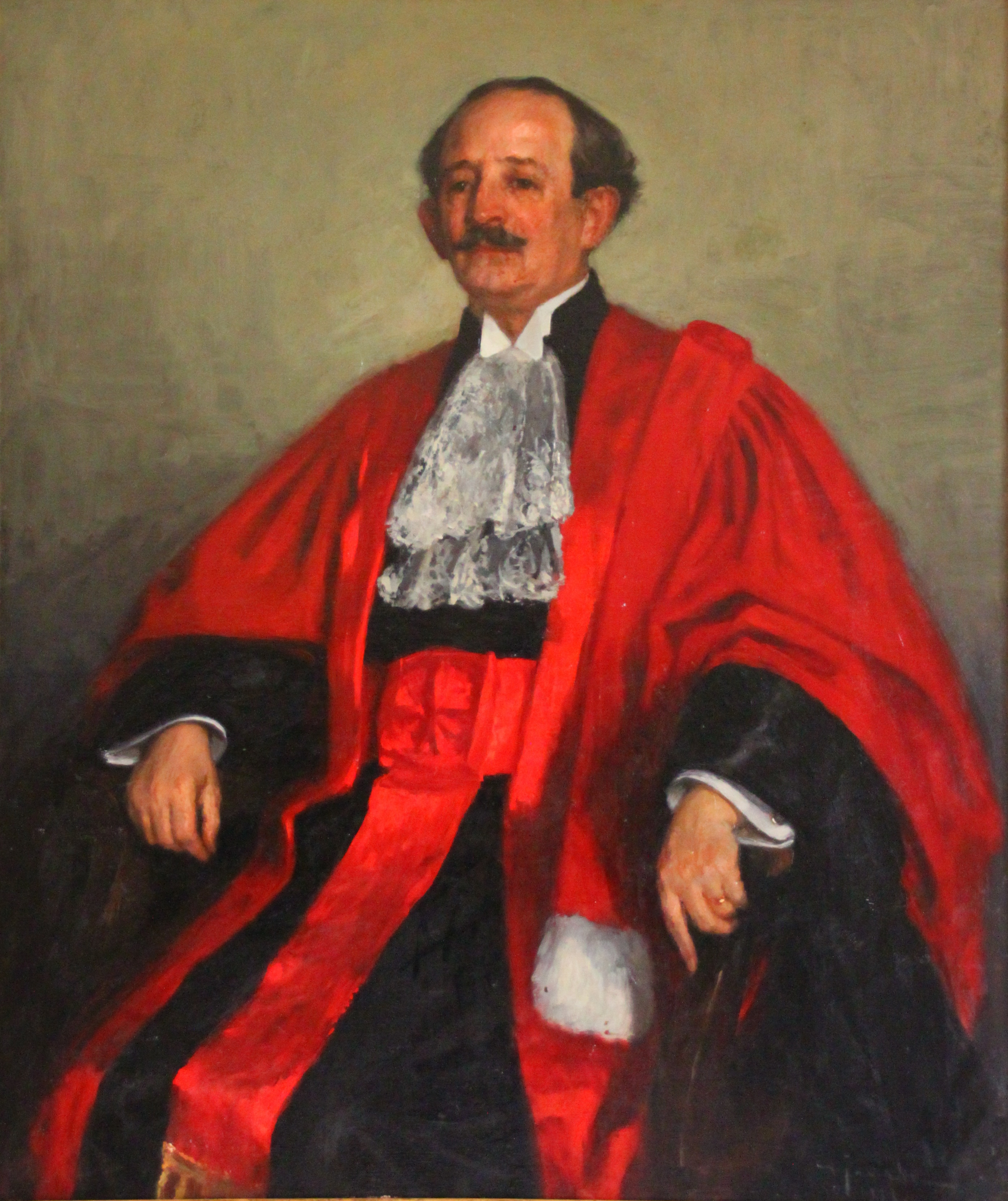
Portrait of Andrei Rădulescu

Andrei Rădulescu (28 November 1880 – 30 September 1959) was a Romanian jurist. He served as President of the High Court of Cassation and Justice from 1938 to 1940, and as president of the Romanian Academy from 1946 to 1948.

== Early life ==
He was born in Chiojdeanca, Prahova County. His parents belonged to the moșnean class of landowning peasants. He had one sister who survived into adulthood. He attended primary school in his village between 1887 and 1893, enrolling in the Peter and Paul High School in Ploiești in 1894. He graduated from the University of Bucharest's law faculty in 1905, completing courses at its literature and philosophy faculty the following year, and earning both degrees magna cum laude.

== Career ==
=== Academic ===
He began teaching international public law at the School of State Sciences in September 1913, remaining on its faculty until his resignation in autumn 1940. He was a teaching assistant at the law faculty from 1916 to 1920, focusing on the history of Romanian private law. At the Academy of High Commercial and Industrial Studies, where he taught from 1918 to 1947, when he was obliged to retire, he taught civil, international, commercial and constitutional law. Finally, he taught international public law at a school for soldiers (1920–1940) and one for officers (1931–1940).

He wrote over 200 publications in the social sciences, primarily in the legal field.

In June 1919, Rădulescu was elected a corresponding member of the Romanian Academy and included in its history section. A year later, upon the proposal of Vasile Pârvan, he was elevated to titular member, occupying the seat previously held by A. D. Xenopol. His opening speech, delivered in June 1922, was called "Romanian culture in the last century". Becoming secretary of the history section in 1923, he was elected vice president ten times between 1926 and 1945. He was president of the academy from May 1946 to 10 June 1948. He lost his leadership position when the new Communist regime revamped the academy, although he was allowed to remain a member. Starting in 1944, he helped lay the groundwork for the academy's legal research institute, which opened in 1954 and carries his name since 2006.

=== Jurist ===
During his academic career, Rădulescu rose in rank in the court system, beginning as a substitute judge at the Argeș County tribunal in April 1907. In 1908, he became a full judge and transferred to the Bucharest-headquartered Ilfov County court in 1910. Declared exempt from service in World War I, he remained as a judge in the capital that was occupied by the Central Powers, taking a hard line against abuses committed by the temporary authorities.

In 1920 he was promoted to the Bucharest Court of Appeal, rising to the High Court of Cassation and Justice in 1925. Initially presiding over one of its panels, he became president of the entire court in June 1938, under the National Renaissance Front regime. While in this position, in which he acquired a reputation for erudition, he contributed to the 1939 law establishing a fourth court panel and consequent increase in the number of judges, relaunched an updated court publication, obtained pay raises for judges and pushed for a new headquarters, considering the Palace of Justice to be insufficient. On 6 September 1940, the day King Carol II abdicated, a decree removed Rădulescu from the court presidency.

== Selected bibliography ==
- Din viața și activitatea lui Andronache Donici (1906)
- Privire asupra organizării judecătorești din Dobrogea veche de la anexare până azi (1914)
- Pravilistul Flechtenmacher (1916)
- Studii de drept civil (1920)
- Cultura juridică românească în ultimul secol (1923)
- Viaţa juridică și administrativă a satelor (1927)
- Izvoarele Codului Calimachi (1927)
- Influența belgiană asupra dreptului românesc (1931)
- Originalitatea dreptului românesc (1933)
- Romanitatea dreptului nostru (1939)
- Dreptul românesc în Basarabia (1943)

== Personal life ==
In November 1918, Rădulescu married Constanța Grajdănescu (1896–1952), a member of an old boyar family whose father had been a Senator during the Romanian War of Independence. Their first son died just after being born; another son and three daughters followed.

Upon his death in 1959, he was buried alongside his wife at Bellu cemetery in his red judge's robe. By that time, he was the earliest member of the academy, and his colleagues held a memorial session in his honor.

He received the Order of the Crown, Knight (1913), the Order of the Star of Romania, Commander (1922) and the Order of Labor, First Class (1956).

== Sources ==
- (in Romanian) Academician Andrei Rădulescu (1880–1959) at the Academician Andrei Rădulescu Institute for Juridical Studies site
- (in Romanian) Andrei Rădulescu at the Bucharest Court of Appeals site
