= Sensul iubirii =

Sensul iubirii is a 1960 poetry collection by Romanian writer Nichita Stănescu. It is a collection of love poems which explore the meaning of love. The title of the collection refers to this also.

It is the poet's debut poetry volume. Poems from the volume were previously published in the Tribuna, no. 6, 17 March 1957, and Gazeta literară, no. 12, 21 March 1957.
