= Eugen Simion =

Romanian literary critic and historian (1933–2022)

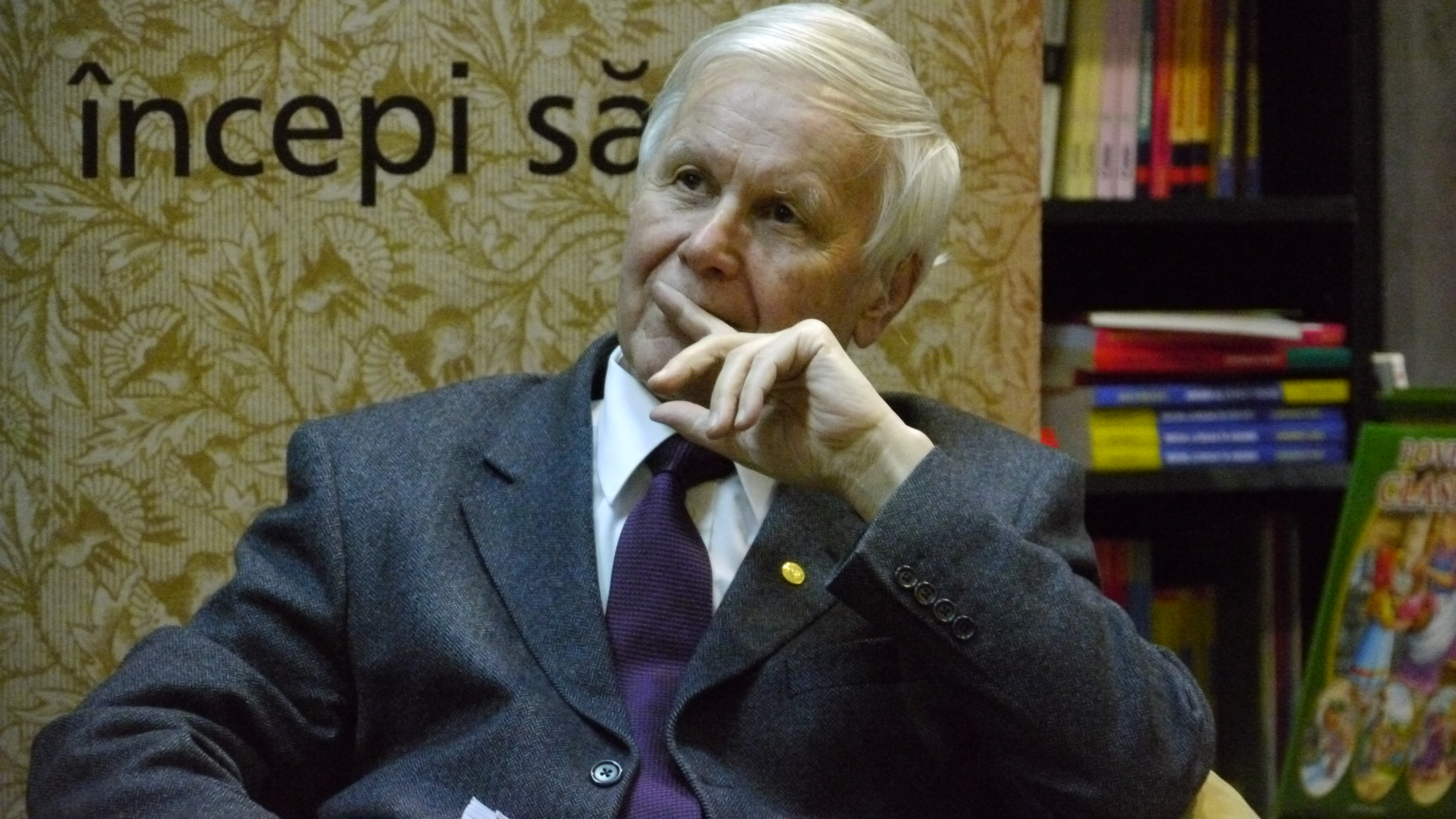
- Simion in 2011
- Born: May 25, 1933; Chiojdeanca, Kingdom of Romania
- Died: October 18, 2022 (aged 89); Bucharest, Romania
- Resting place: Bellu Cemetery, Bucharest
- Education: University of Bucharest
- Awards: Order of the Star of Romania, Grand Cross; Order of the Republic (Moldova)
- Scientific career
- Workplaces: University of Bucharest

Eugen Simion (25 May 1933 – 18 October 2022) was a Romanian literary critic and historian, editor, essayist and academic.

Born in Chiojdeanca, Prahova County, the son of two farmers, Simion completed his secondary education at the Saints Peter and Paul High School in Ploiești. He then studied philology at the University of Bucharest, and made his professional debut as a literary critic in 1960, collaborating with the journals Tribuna and Gazeta literară. With his first book, Proza lui Eminescu, published in 1964, he was awarded the literary criticism prize of the Uniunii Scriitorilor (the Romanian Writers' Union). The same year he started working in his alma mater, first as an assistant, later as a lecturer, and from 1990 as a professor. He also held courses on Romanian culture and civilisation at the Sorbonne University between 1970 and 1973.

Simion's body of work includes numerous monographs, essays, curation of anthologies as well as over 3,000 published articles and studies. A full member of the Romanian Academy since 1992, he served as president of the organization for two consecutive mandates, from 1998 to 2006, when he was nominated President of the Philology and Literature Department of the academy, a role which he served until his death. He died on 18 October 2022 at the Elias Hospital, aged 89, and was buried at Bellu Cemetery, in Bucharest.
