= Lapoș oil field =

Oil field in Lapoș, Romania

Lapoș
- Country: Romania
- Region: Prahova County
- Offshore/onshore: Onshore
- Operator: Toreador Resources

Field history
- Discovery: 2006
- Start of development: 2006
- Start of production: 2015

Production
- Current production of oil: 1,000 barrels per day (~50,000 t/a)
- Estimated oil in place: 5.3 million tonnes (~ 6×10^{6} m^{3} or 40 million bbl)

The Lapoș oil field is an oil field located in Lapoș, Prahova County, Romania. It was discovered in 2006 and is being developed by Toreador Resources. It began production in 2015 and produces oil. The total proven reserves of the Lapoș oil field are around 40 million barrels (5.3 million tonnes), and production will be centered on 1,000 barrels per day (160 m^{3}/d).
