= Urlați =

- Town
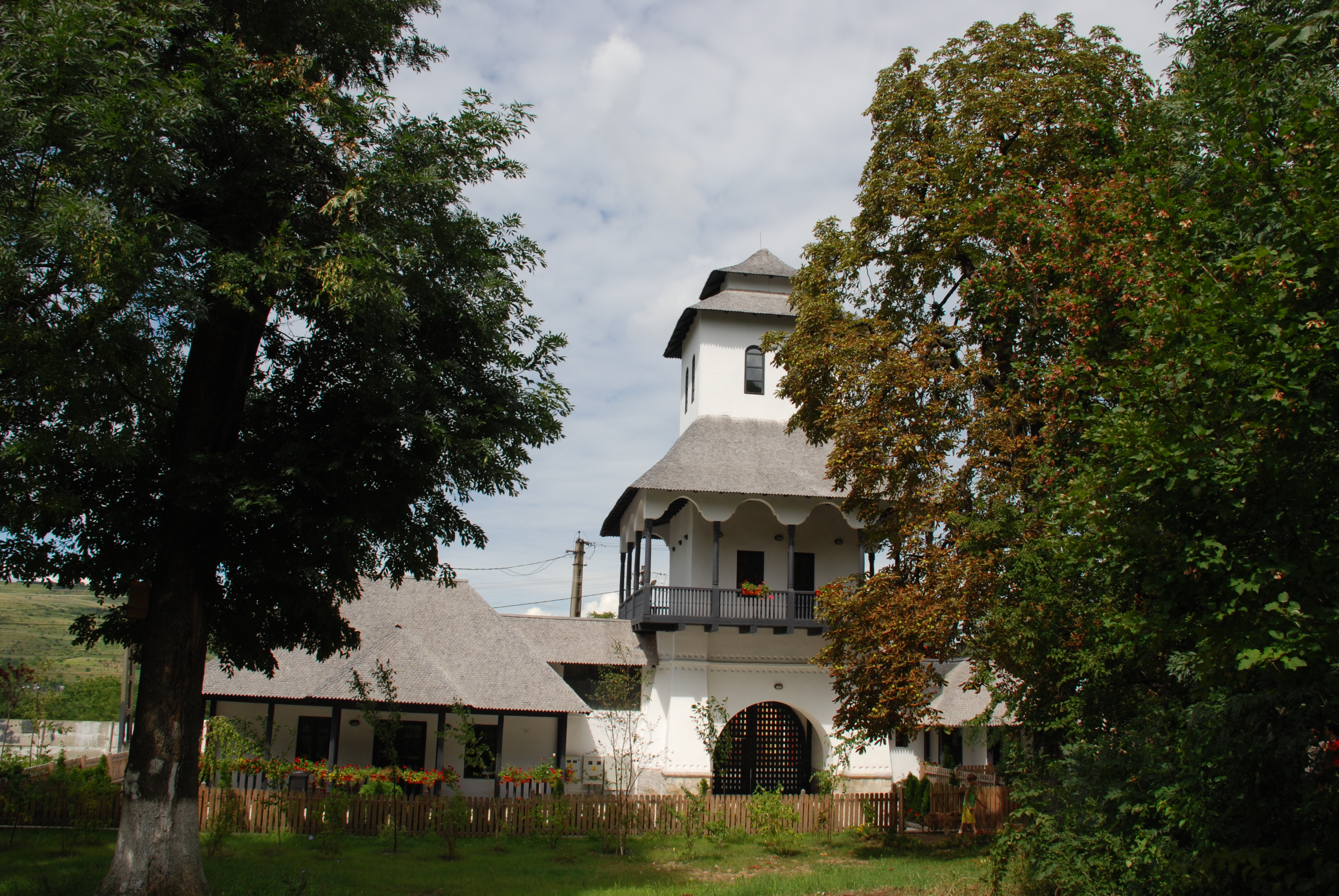
- Conacul Bellu Museum

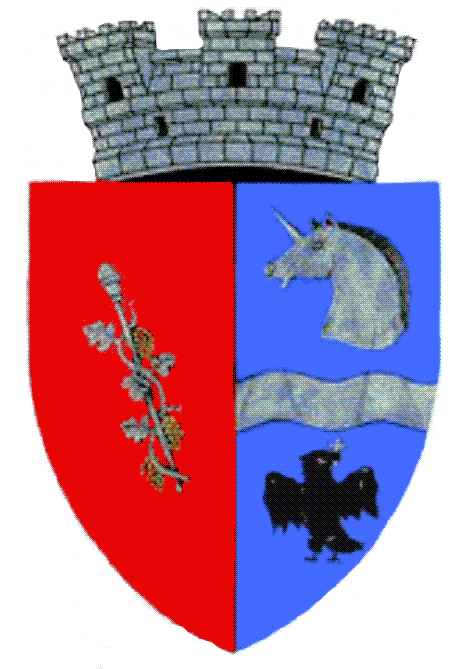
- Coat of arms

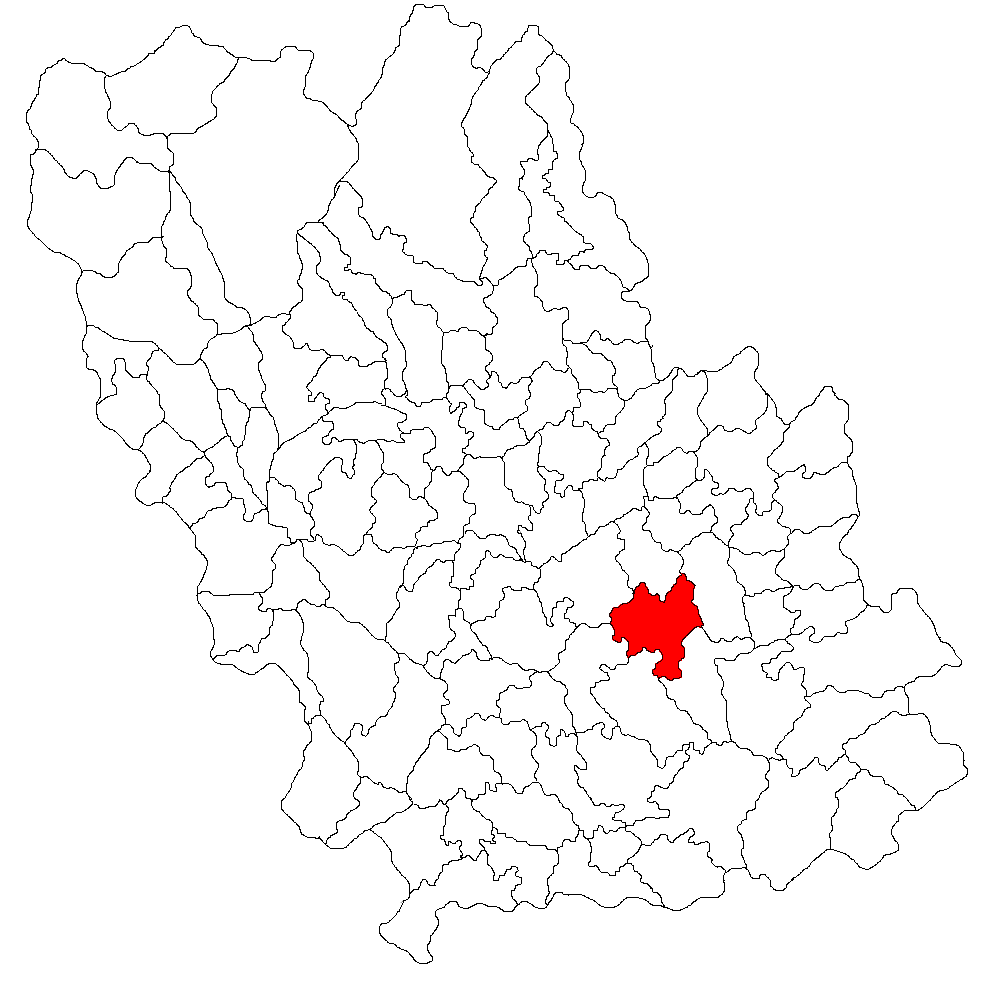
- Location in Prahova County

- Location in Romania
- Coordinates: 44°59′28″N 26°13′50″E
- Country: Romania
- County: Prahova

Government
  - Mayor (2024–2028): Marian Măchițescu (PNL)
- Area: 43.67 km^{2} (16.86 sq mi)
- Elevation: 142 m (466 ft)
- Population (2021-12-01): 10,131
  - Density: 232.0/km^{2} (600.9/sq mi)
- Time zone: UTC+02:00 (EET)
  - Summer (DST): UTC+03:00 (EEST)
- Postal code: 106300
- Area code: +40 x44
- Vehicle reg.: PH
- Website: www.urlati.ro

Urlați (Romanian pronunciation: [urˈlat͡sʲ]) is a town in Prahova County, Muntenia, Romania. In 2021, it had a population of 10,131. Sixteen villages are administered by the town: Arioneștii Noi, Arioneștii Vechi, Cherba, Jercălăi, Mărunțiș, Orzoaia de Jos, Orzoaia de Sus, Schiau, Ulmi, Valea Bobului, Valea Crângului, Valea Mieilor, Valea Nucetului, Valea Pietrei, Valea Seman and Valea Urloii.

The town is located in the south-central part of the county. It borders the following communes: Ceptura to the northeast, Tomșani to the southeast, Albești Paleologu to the south, Valea Călugărească to the southwest, Plopu to the west, and Iordăcheanu to the north.

The river Cricovul Sărat flows through Urlați.

== Natives ==
- Octavian Grigore (born 1964), football manager and former player
- Constantin Vișoianu (1897–1994), jurist, diplomat, and politician, who served as Minister of Foreign Affairs at the end or World War II

Historical population
Year	Pop.	±%
1912	4,441	—
1930	5,501	+23.9%
1948	6,661	+21.1%
1956	8,658	+30.0%
1966	9,145	+5.6%
1977	10,654	+16.5%
1992	12,309	+15.5%
2002	11,858	−3.7%
2011	10,064	−15.1%
2021	10,131	+0.7%
Source: Census data

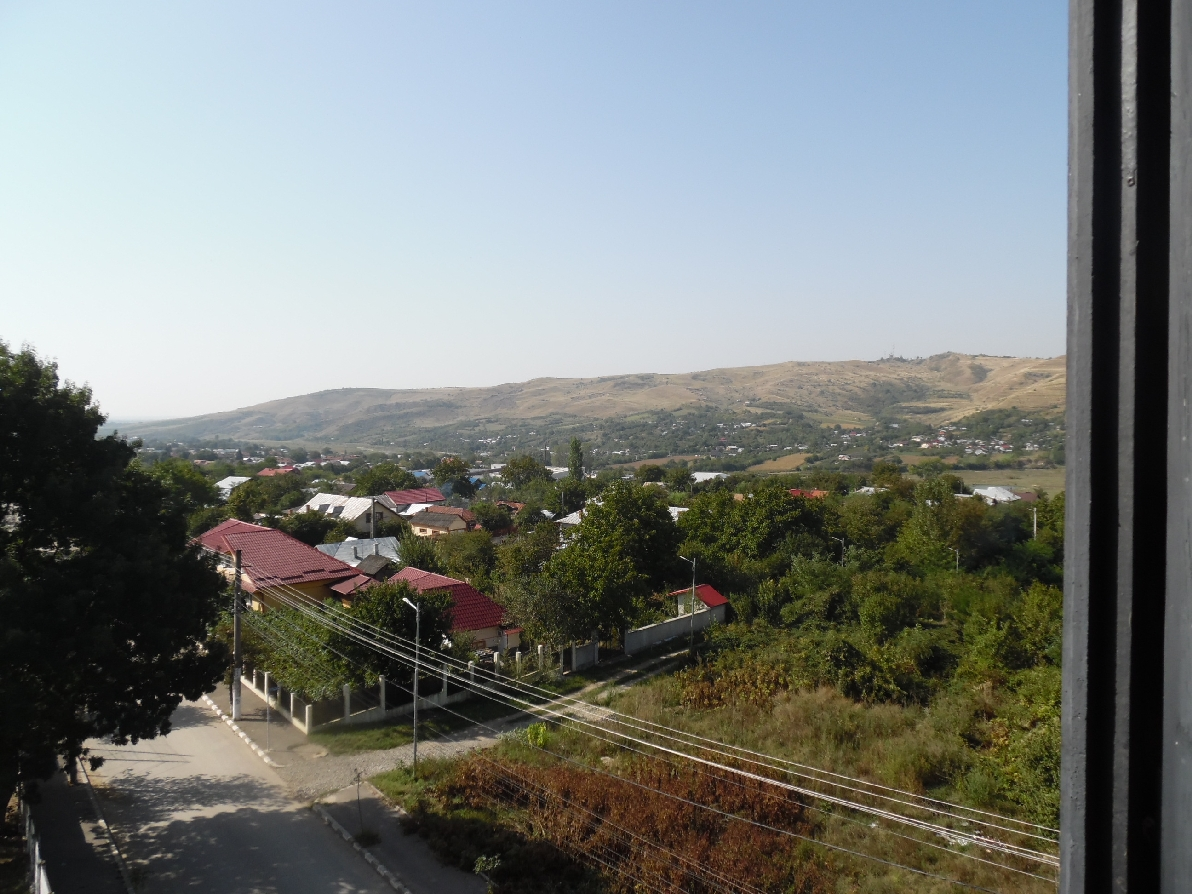
View of Urlați

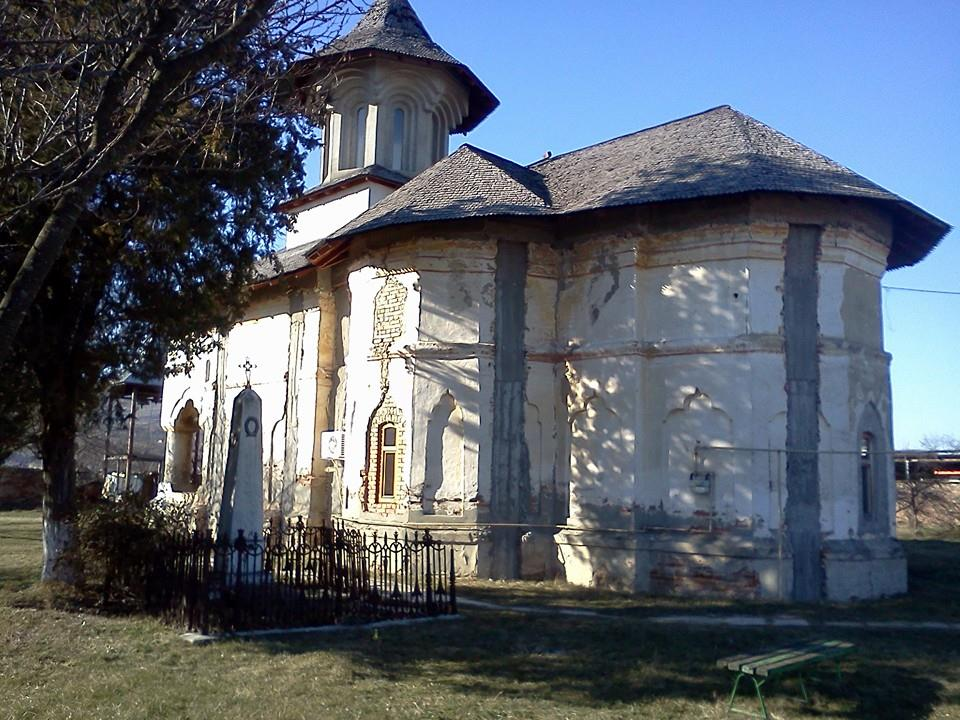
Church in Urlați

== Climate ==
Urlați has a humid subtropical climate (Cfa in the Köppen climate classification).

Climate data for Urlați
Month	Jan	Feb	Mar	Apr	May	Jun	Jul	Aug	Sep	Oct	Nov	Dec	Year
Mean daily maximum °C (°F)	2.8 (37.0)	5.6 (42.1)	10.6 (51.1)	16.1 (61.0)	21.4 (70.5)	25 (77)	27.2 (81.0)	27.5 (81.5)	22 (72)	15.8 (60.4)	9.9 (49.8)	4.7 (40.5)	15.7 (60.3)
Daily mean °C (°F)	−1.4 (29.5)	0.8 (33.4)	5.3 (41.5)	10.9 (51.6)	16.3 (61.3)	20.3 (68.5)	22.4 (72.3)	22.4 (72.3)	17.1 (62.8)	11 (52)	5.8 (42.4)	0.5 (32.9)	11.0 (51.7)
Mean daily minimum °C (°F)	−5 (23)	−3.5 (25.7)	−0.1 (31.8)	4.8 (40.6)	10.2 (50.4)	14.5 (58.1)	16.6 (61.9)	16.7 (62.1)	11.9 (53.4)	6.4 (43.5)	2.1 (35.8)	−2.7 (27.1)	6.0 (42.8)
Average precipitation mm (inches)	42 (1.7)	38 (1.5)	47 (1.9)	60 (2.4)	76 (3.0)	78 (3.1)	70 (2.8)	41 (1.6)	55 (2.2)	53 (2.1)	49 (1.9)	50 (2.0)	659 (26.2)
Source: https://en.climate-data.org/europe/romania/prahova/urlati-19252/
