= Curmătura River =

Curmătura River may refer to the following rivers in Romania:

- Curmătura, a tributary of the Latorița in Vâlcea County
- Curmătura, a tributary of the Sitna in Botoșani County

== See also ==
- Curmătura (disambiguation)
