= Remus Opriș =

Romanian politician and psychiatrist (1958–2019)

Constantin Remus Opriș (November 20, 1958 – May 20, 2019) was a Romanian politician and psychiatrist, a prominent member of the Christian Democratic National Peasants' Party (PNȚ-CD) and former Minister-Delegate for Local Administration in the 1996–1998 Victor Ciorbea cabinet (formed around the Romanian Democratic Convention, CDR). He was a member of the Chamber of Deputies elected for Prahova County for three consecutive terms, between 1992 and 2000.

== Biography ==
Opriș was born in Ploiești, graduating from the Ion Luca Caragiale High School in 1977, and from the Bucharest Carol Davila General Medicine and Pharmacy Faculty in 1983. He was a general practitioner until 1990, when he began his specialization in Psychiatry (completed in 1992). In 1999, he completed a post-graduate course at the National College of Defense.

== Career ==
Joining the PNȚ-CD after the 1989 Revolution, Opriș became leader of its youth organization on 1991 (serving until 1993), a junior member of its Leadership Bureau (1991–1995, during the time when the party was headed by Corneliu Coposu) and its Vice President in 1996. As a member of the Chamber, he sat on its Committee for Health and Family throughout his mandates, and advanced legislation on medical practice, the creation of a College of Romanian Doctors, health insurance, and forensic science.

Upon the CDR's creation, before the elections of 1996, he became the new body's campaign organizer. In December 1996, after the election victory, Opriş was appointed to ministerial office, as Minister-Delegate for Coordinating the General Secretariat of the Government and of the Department for Local Public Administration. He proposed several new laws, including those on ministerial responsibility, the status of civil servants, on property rights, and on local budgets, as well as issuing a 1997 ordinance to amend the Law on Public Administration.

During the new Radu Vasile government, Remus Opriș was also noted for his criticism of Democratic Party (PD), the CDR's coalition partner, and condemned the decision taken by Radu Berceanu, the PD's Minister of Industry and Commerce, to replace PNȚ-CD-appointed members of the administrative boards for state-owned enterprises such as RENEL and ROMGAZ. At the time, he stated: "If the PD believes Mr. Berceanu's decision was fair, that means the PD is trying to gain electoral capital by further harassing its coalition partners".

He soon became noted for his opposition to the Premier, and called on him to resign — according to the journalist Sorin Roșca-Stănescu, Opriș was the leader of a PNȚ-CD faction who came into conflict with Vasile's faction. After the Vasile cabinet was replaced with that of Mugur Isărescu, the PNȚ-CD went on to face a parliamentary crisis due to a standoff with the PD, when the PD's Minister of Defense, Victor Babiuc, decided to leave his party — the PD refused to pass legislation until Babiuc was to be replaced with Sorin Frunzăverde. In response, Opriş called on all other coalition partners (the National Liberals, the Social Democrats, the Democratic Alliance of Hungarians and various minor groups) to express support for the proposed legislation, and argued that new laws could conceivably be passed with support from opposition parties. (The crisis was ultimately overcome when Frunzăverde took over as minister.)

No longer elected to office in the elections of 2000 (when the PNȚ-CD as a whole failed to pass the election threshold in either chamber of Parliament), Opriș resumed his activity as Vice President of the PNȚ-CD (briefly renamed Christian-Democratic People's Party, PPCD). In March 2006, he rejected the offer of fusion proposed by the PD, aimed at creating a "center-right pole" in Romanian politics, and indicated that the National Peasants' Party would carry on as an independent force.

In July 2006, Opriș was presented by the National Council for the Study of Securitate Archives with the file kept on him by the Securitate, attesting that Communist Romanian authorities had him under constant surveillance between 1976 and 1978, and again in 1981. At the time, he specified, 16 Securitate officers had overseen his case, and he had been reported on by 22 informants.

He died in Bucharest in 2019, age 60, and was buried at Eternitatea Cemetery in Ploiești.

== See also ==
- Christian Democratic National Peasants' Party (PNȚ-CD)
