= Nichita Stănescu =

Romanian poet and essayist

Nichita Hristea Stănescu
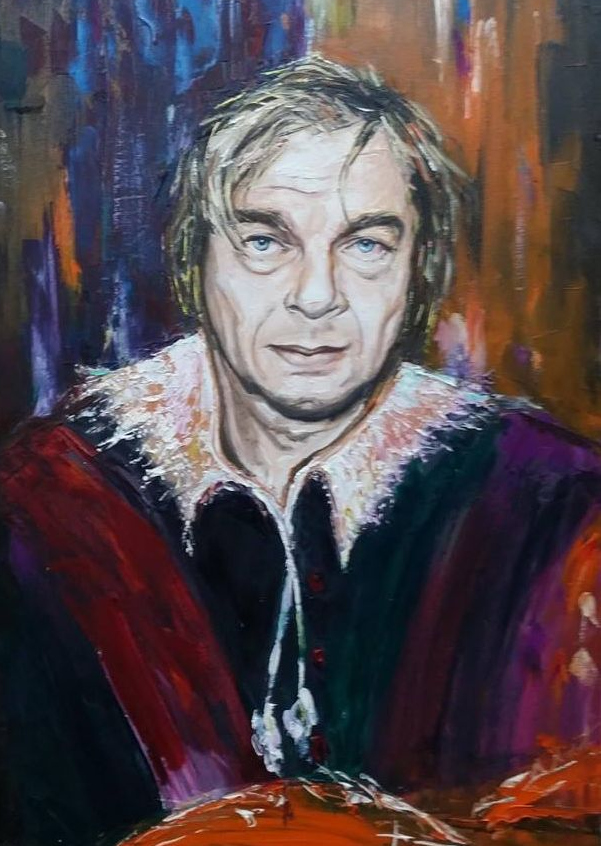
- Portrait of Nichita Stănescu by Paul Mecet
- Born: 31 March 1933; Ploiești, Prahova County, Romania
- Died: 13 December 1983 (aged 50); Emergency Hospital, Bucharest, Romania
- Resting place: Bellu Cemetery, Bucharest, Romania
- Education: Ion Luca Caragiale High School (Ploiești)
- Alma mater: University of Bucharest
- Years active: 1960–1982 (1960–1998; posthumous)
- Known for: Poet
- Notable work: 11 elegii, Noduri si semne
- Political party: Romanian Communist Party
- Spouses: Magdalena Petrescu (m. 1952; div. 1953) Doina Ciurea (m. 1962; div. 1972) Todorița ”Dora” Tărâță (m. 1982–1983)
- Partner: Gabriela Melinescu (?–before 1982)
- Awards: Herder Prize, 1975; Golden Wreath Struga Poetry Evenings, 1982

Signature
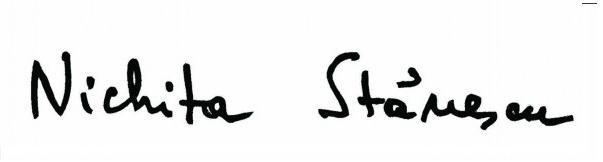

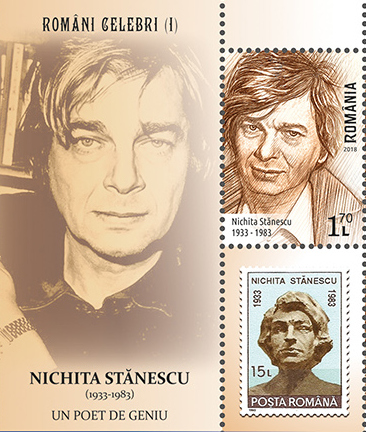
Stănescu on a 2018 stamp sheet of Romania

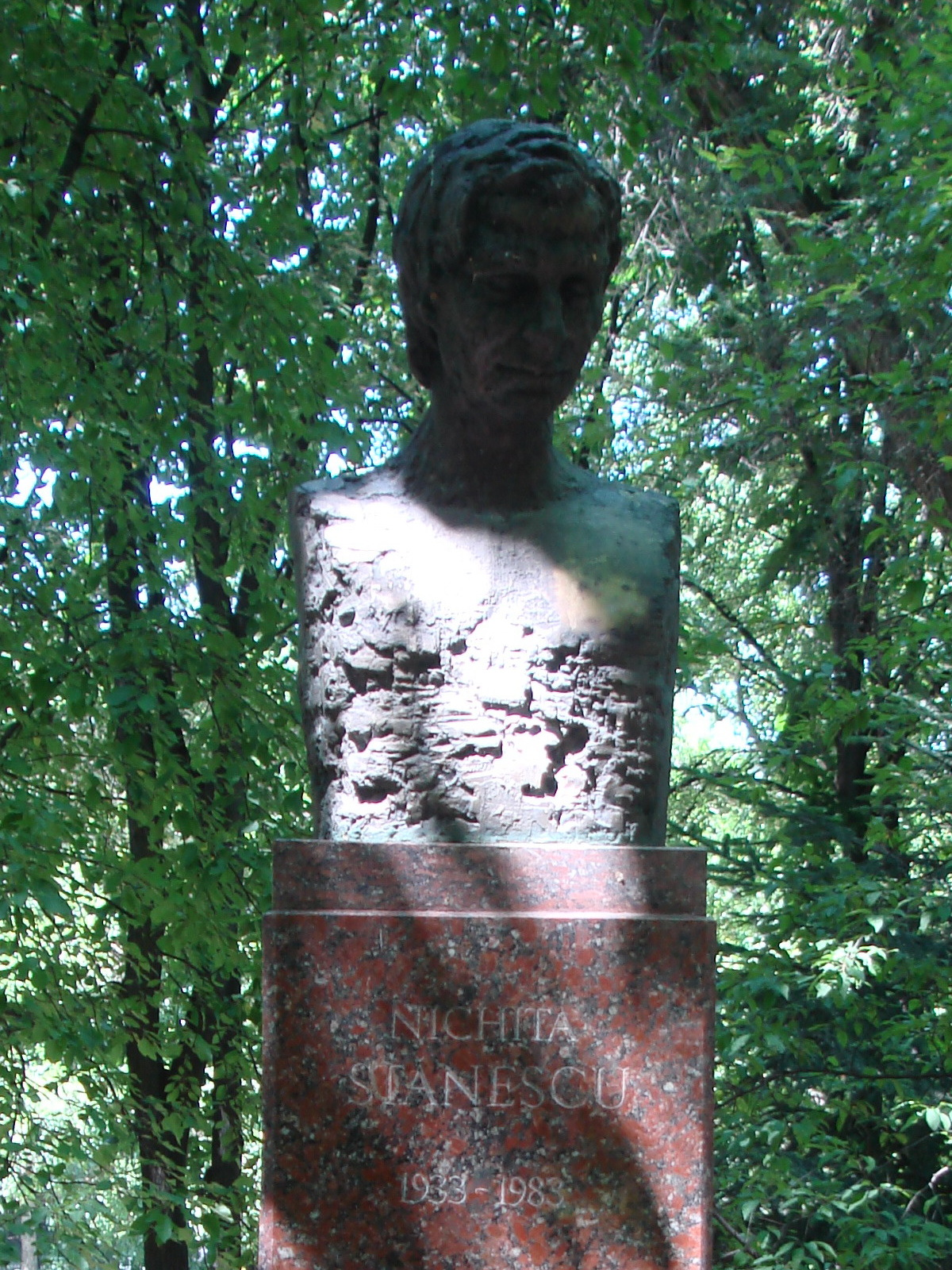
Statue of Stănescu in the Alley of Classics, Chișinău

Nichita Stănescu (Romanian pronunciation: [niˈkita stəˈnesku]; born Nichita Hristea Stănescu; 31 March 1933 – 13 December 1983) was a Romanian poet and essayist.

== Biography ==
Stănescu's father was Nicolae Hristea Stănescu (1908–1982). His mother, Tatiana Cereaciuchin, was Russian (originally from Voronezh, she had fled Russia and married in 1931). Nichita Stănescu graduated from the Ion Luca Caragiale High School in Ploiești, then went on to study Romanian language and literature at the University of Bucharest, graduating in 1957. He made his literary debut in the Tribuna literary magazine.

Stănescu married Magdalena Petrescu in 1952, but the couple separated a year later. In 1962 he married Doina Ciurea. In 1982 he married Todorița "Dora" Tărâță.

For much of his career, Stănescu was a contributor to and editor of Gazeta Literară, România Literară, and Luceafărul.

His editorial debut was the poetry book Sensul iubirii ("The Aim of Love"), which appeared under the Luceafărul selection, in 1960. He also was the recipient of numerous awards for his verse, the most important being the Herder Prize in 1975 and a nomination for the Nobel Prize in 1980. The last volume of poetry published in his lifetime was Noduri și semne ("Knots and Signs"), published in 1982. A heavy drinker, he died of cardiopulmonary arrest. He is buried in Bucharest's Bellu Cemetery.

== Awards ==
- The Romanian Writers' Union Award (1964, 1969, 1972, 1975)
- Herder Prize (1975)
- Romanian Academy's “Mihai Eminescu” Award (1975)
- Golden Wreath laureate of the Struga Poetry Evenings (1982)
- Elected post-mortem member of the Romanian Academy

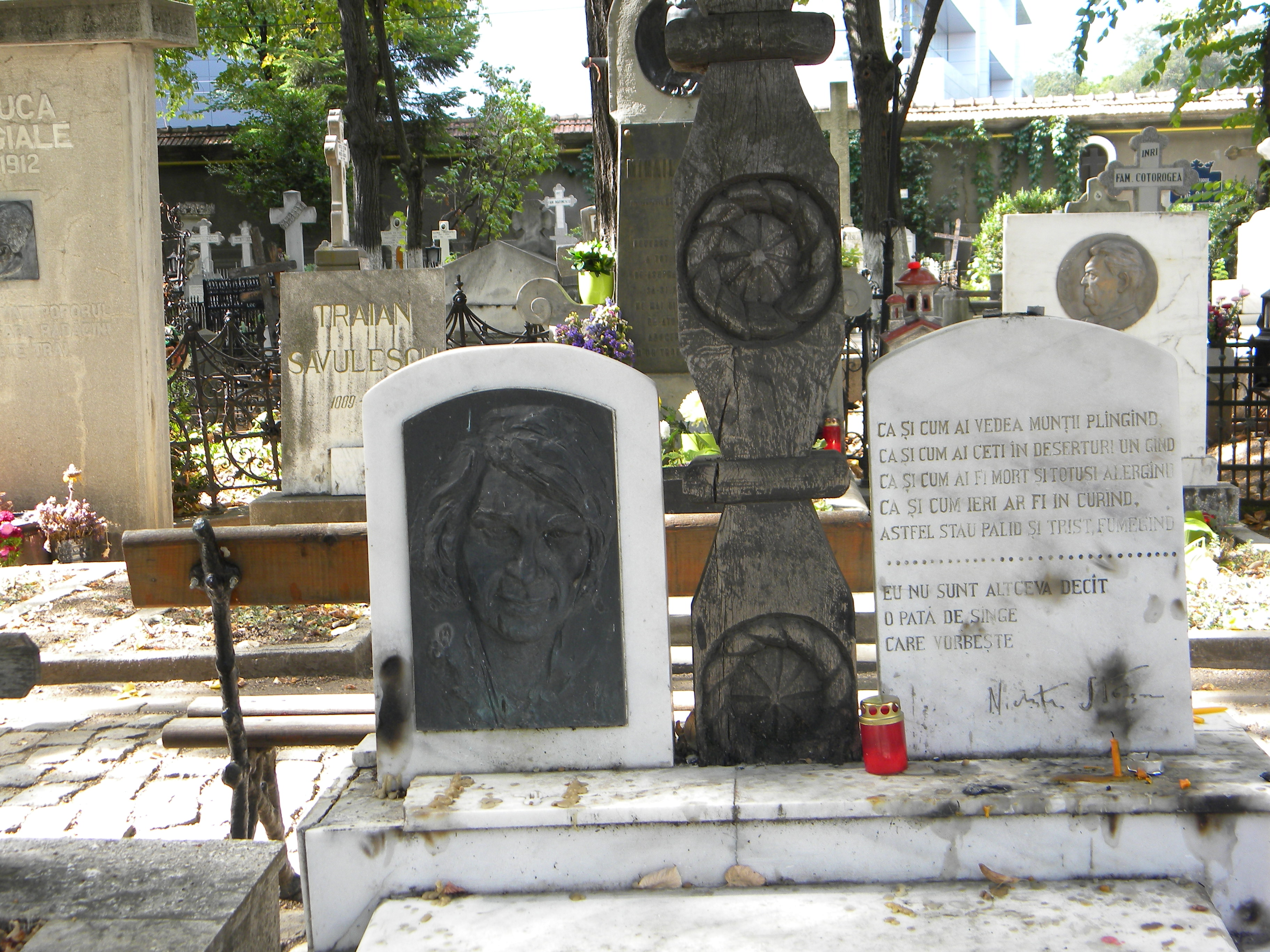
Grave at Bellu Cemetery

== Legacy ==
There is a national poetry festival and an award named Stănescu in his honor.

There are high schools named after him in Ploiești and in Sector 3 of Bucharest. Streets in Blejoi, Cluj-Napoca, Dej, Mogoșoaia, Pipera (Voluntari), Ploiești, and Vama Veche are named in his honor.

== Volumes ==
- 1960 – Sensul iubirii ("The Meaning of Love")
- 1964 – O viziune a sentimentelor ("A Vision of Feelings")
- 1965 – Dreptul la timp ("The Right to Time")
- 1966 – 11 elegii ("11 Elegies")
- 1967 –
  - Roșu vertical ("Vertical Red"),
  - Alfa,
  - Oul și sfera ("The Egg and the Sphere")
- 1968 – Laus Ptolemaei
- 1969 –
  - Necuvintele ("The Unwords"),
  - Un pământ numit România ("A Land Called Romania")
- 1970 – În dulcele stil classic ("In Sweet Classical Style")
- 1972 –
  - Cartea de recitire ("The Re-reading Book")
  - Belgradul în cinci prieteni ("Five Friends in Belgrade")
  - Măreția frigului ("The Greatness of Cold")
- 1978 – Epica Magna
- 1979 – Operele imperfecte ("Imperfect Works")
- 1980 – Carte de citire, carte de iubire ("Book for Reading, Book for Loving")
- 1982 – Oase plângând ("Crying Bones")
- 1982 – Noduri și semne ("Knots and Marks")
- 1982 – Respirări ("Breaths")

=== Posthumous volumes ===
- 1984 – Album memorial ("Memorial Album")
- 1985 – Antimetafizica, Nichita Stănescu însoțit de Aurelian Titu Dumitrescu ("Antimetaphysics, Nichita Stănescu accompanied by Aurelian Titu Dumitrescu")
- 1985 – Nichita Stănescu – Frumos ca umbra unei idei ("Nichita Stănescu – Beautiful as the Shadow of an Idea")
- 1993 – Cântece la drumul mare, 1955–1960 ("Songs on the Open Road, 1955–1960")
- 1993 – Tânjiri spre firesc ("Longings toward the Usual")
- 1995 – Cărțile sibiline ("The Sibylline Books")
- 1998 – Fel de scriere ("A Kind of Writing")
- Noua frontieră a sufletului uman ("The New Frontier of the Human Spirit")
- Scrisori ("Letters")
- 2013 - Jedino moj život (My Life Only), in Serbian

== Presence in English Language Anthologies ==
- Testament - 400 Years of Romanian Poetry - 400 de ani de poezie românească - bilingual edition - Daniel Ioniță (editor and principal translator) with Daniel Reynaud, Adriana Paul & Eva Foster - Editura Minerva, 2019 - ISBN 978-973-21-1070-6\
- Romanian Poetry from its Origins to the Present - bilingual edition English/Romanian - Daniel Ioniță (editor and principal translator) with Daniel Reynaud, Adriana Paul and Eva Foster - Australian-Romanian Academy Publishing - 2020 - ISBN 978-0-9953502-8-1 ; OCLC 1288167046
