= Sălcuța =

Sălcuţa may refer to places in:

== Moldova ==
- Sălcuţa, Căuşeni, a commune in Căuşeni district

== Romania ==
- Sălcuța, Dolj, a commune in Dolj County
- Sălcuţa, a village in Sânmihaiu de Câmpie Commune, Bistriţa-Năsăud County
- Sălcuţa, a village administered by Titu town, Dâmboviţa County
- Sălcuţa, a village in Calopăr Commune, Dolj County

== See also ==
- Salcia (disambiguation)
- Sălcioara (disambiguation)
