= Apostolache =

- Commune
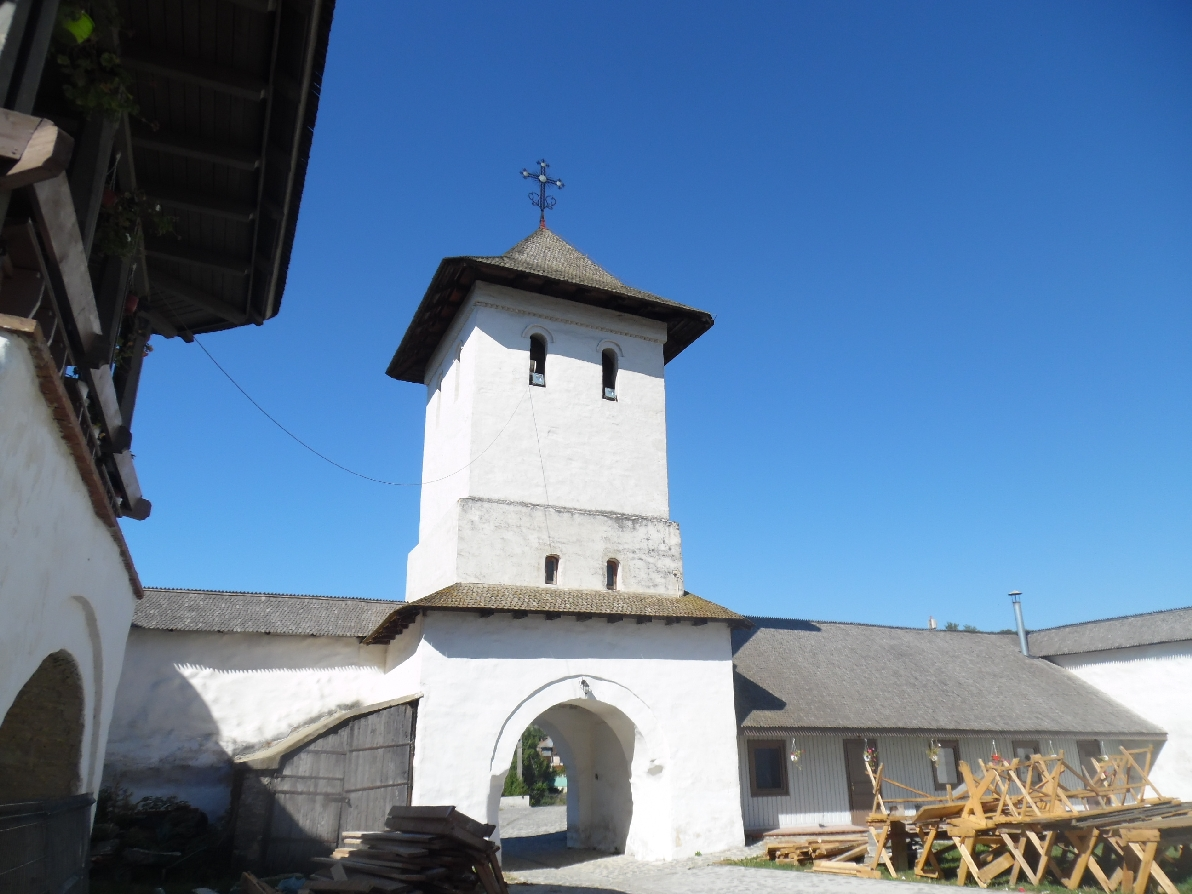
- Tower at the Apostolache Monastery

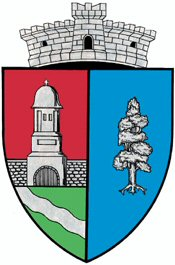
- Coat of arms

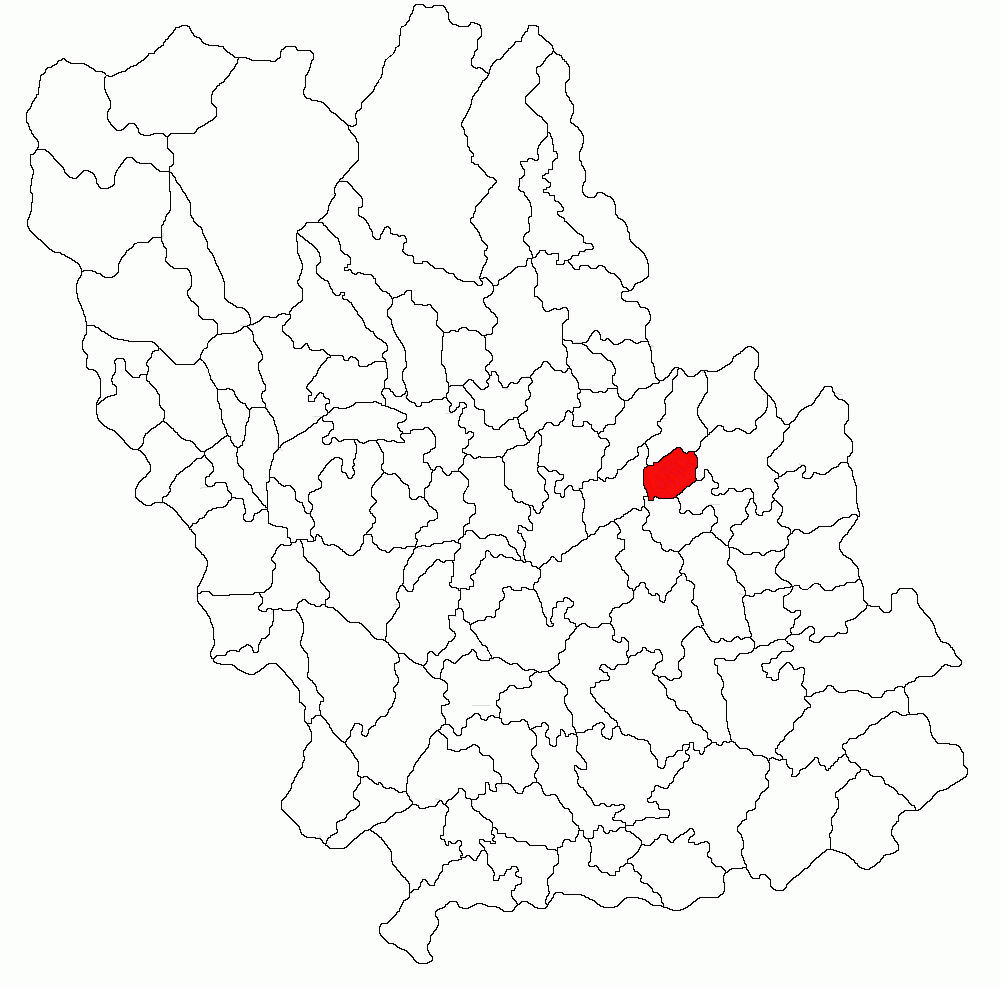
- Location in Prahova County

- Location in Romania
- Coordinates: 45°8′N 26°16′E
- Country: Romania
- County: Prahova

Government
  - Mayor (2020–2024): Mihail Bratu (PNL)
- Area: 20.27 km^{2} (7.83 sq mi)
- Elevation: 184 m (604 ft)
- Population (2021-12-01): 1,930
  - Density: 95.2/km^{2} (247/sq mi)
- Time zone: UTC+02:00 (EET)
  - Summer (DST): UTC+03:00 (EEST)
- Postal code: 107020
- Area code: +(40) 244
- Vehicle reg.: PH
- Website: cjph.ro/localitate/apostolache/

Apostolache is a commune in Prahova County, Muntenia, Romania. It is composed of five villages: Apostolache, Buzota, Mârlogea, Udrești, and Valea Cricovului.

The commune is situated towards the northern edge of the Wallachian Plain, at an altitude of 184 m (604 ft), on the banks of the river Cricovul Sărat. It is located in the central-east part of Prahova County, 28 km (17 mi) northwest of the town of Mizil and 38 km (24 mi) northeast of the county seat, Ploiești.

Historical population
Year	Pop.	±%
1992	2,451	—
2002	2,352	−4.0%
2011	2,164	−8.0%
2021	1,930	−10.8%
Source: Census data
