= Predeal-Sărari =

- Commune
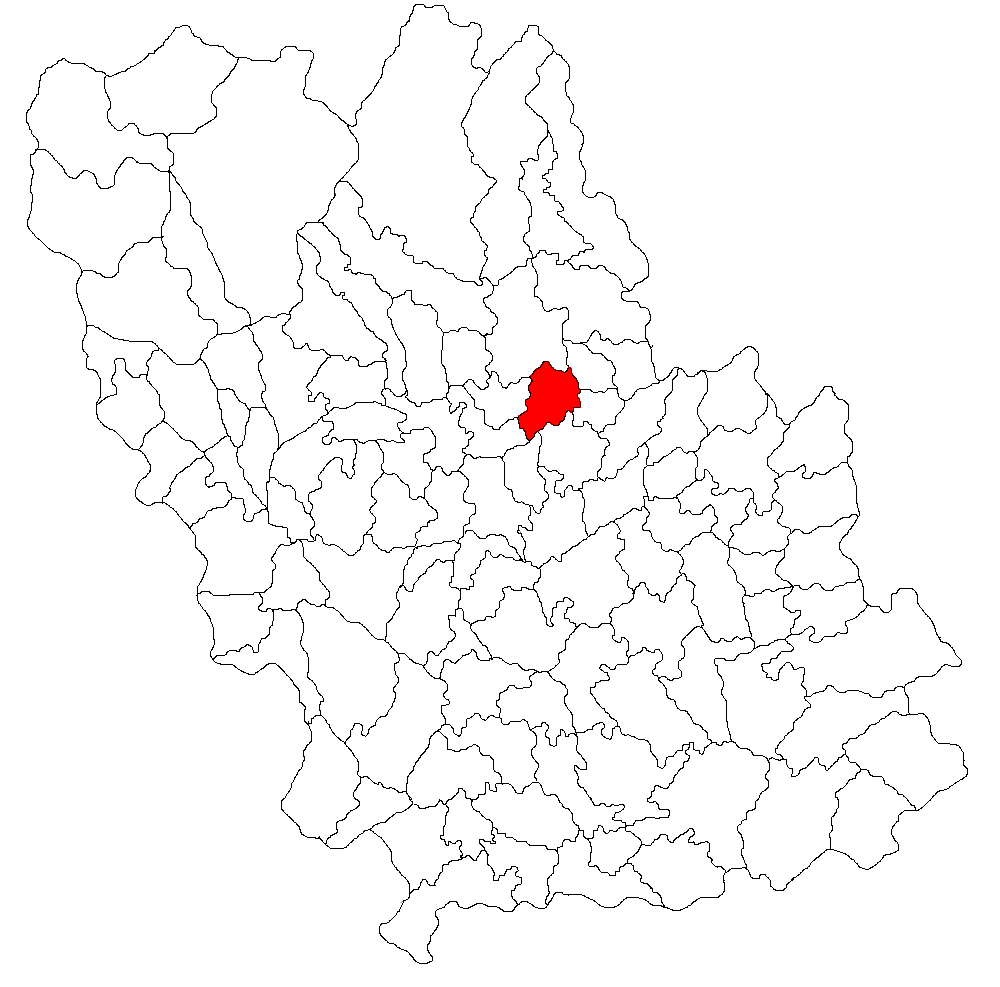
- Location in Prahova County

- Location in Romania
- Coordinates: 45.1878°N 26.1008°E
- Country: Romania
- County: Prahova

Government
  - Mayor (2024–2028): Gheorghe Purcăroiu (PNL)
- Area: 24.33 km^{2} (9.39 sq mi)
- Elevation: 463 m (1,519 ft)
- Population (2021-12-01): 2,127
  - Density: 87/km^{2} (230/sq mi)
- Time zone: EET/EEST (UTC+2/+3)
- Postal code: 107463
- Area code: +(40) 244
- Vehicle reg.: PH
- Website: primariapredeal-sarari.ro

Predeal-Sărari is a commune in Prahova County, Muntenia, Romania. It is composed of nine villages: Bobicești, Poienile, Predeal (the commune centre), Sărari, Sărățel, Tulburea, Tulburea-Văleni, Vitioara de Sus, and Zâmbroaia.

Historical population
Year	Pop.	±%
2002	2,688	—
2011	2,337	−13.1%
2021	2,127	−9.0%
Source: Census data
