= Șoimari =

- Commune
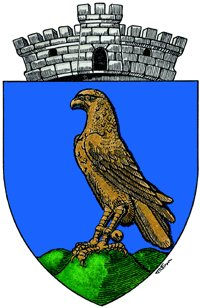
- Coat of arms

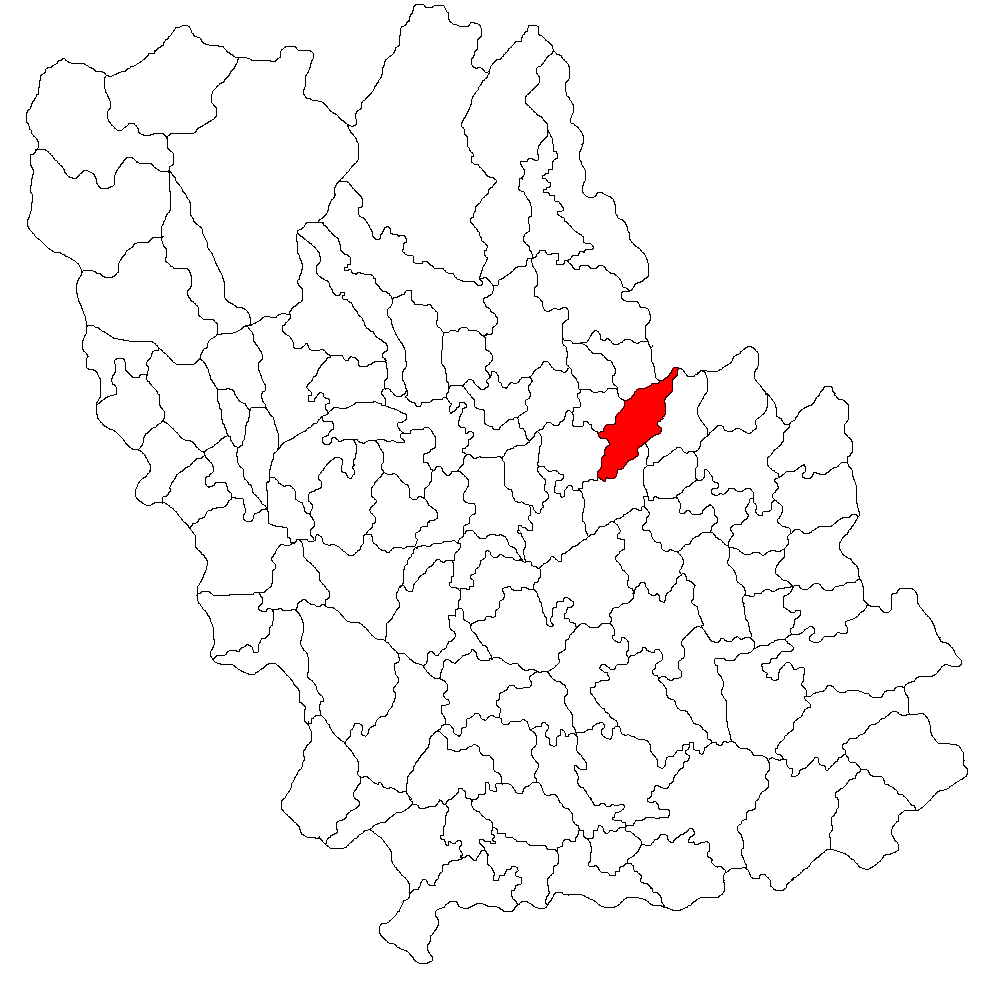
- Location in Prahova County

- Location in Romania
- Coordinates: 45°11′N 26°12′E
- Country: Romania
- County: Prahova

Government
  - Mayor (2020–2024): Laurențiu Ion Bădica (PSD)
- Elevation: 226 m (741 ft)
- Population (2021-12-01): 2,611
- Time zone: EET/EEST (UTC+2/+3)
- Postal code: 107560
- Area code: +(40) 244
- Vehicle reg.: PH
- Website: comunasoimari.ro

Șoimari is a commune in Prahova County, Muntenia, Romania. It is composed of three villages: Lopatnița, Măgura, and Șoimari.

Historical population
Year	Pop.	±%
1992	3,101	—
2002	3,196	+3.1%
2011	3,026	−5.3%
2021	2,611	−13.7%
Source: Census data
