= Albești-Paleologu =

- Commune
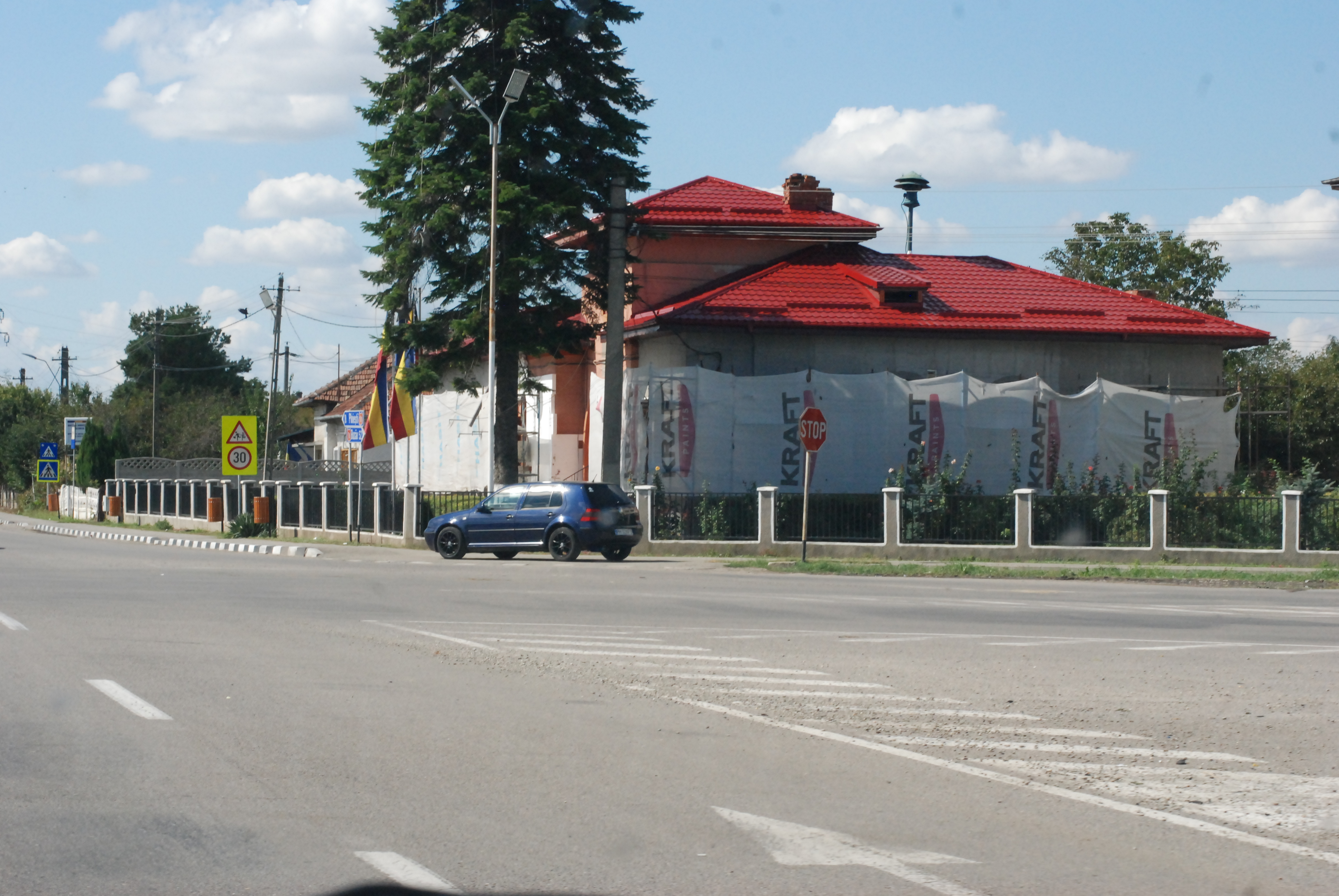
- Town hall of Albești-Paleologu commune

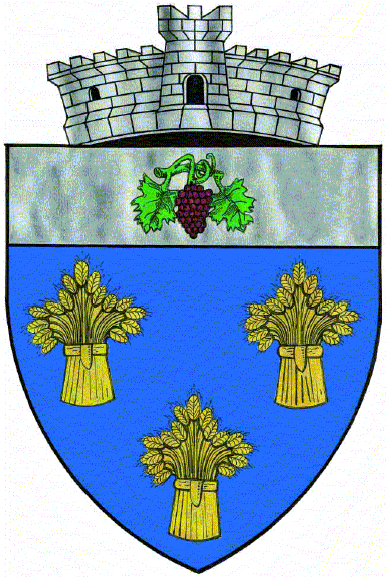
- Coat of arms

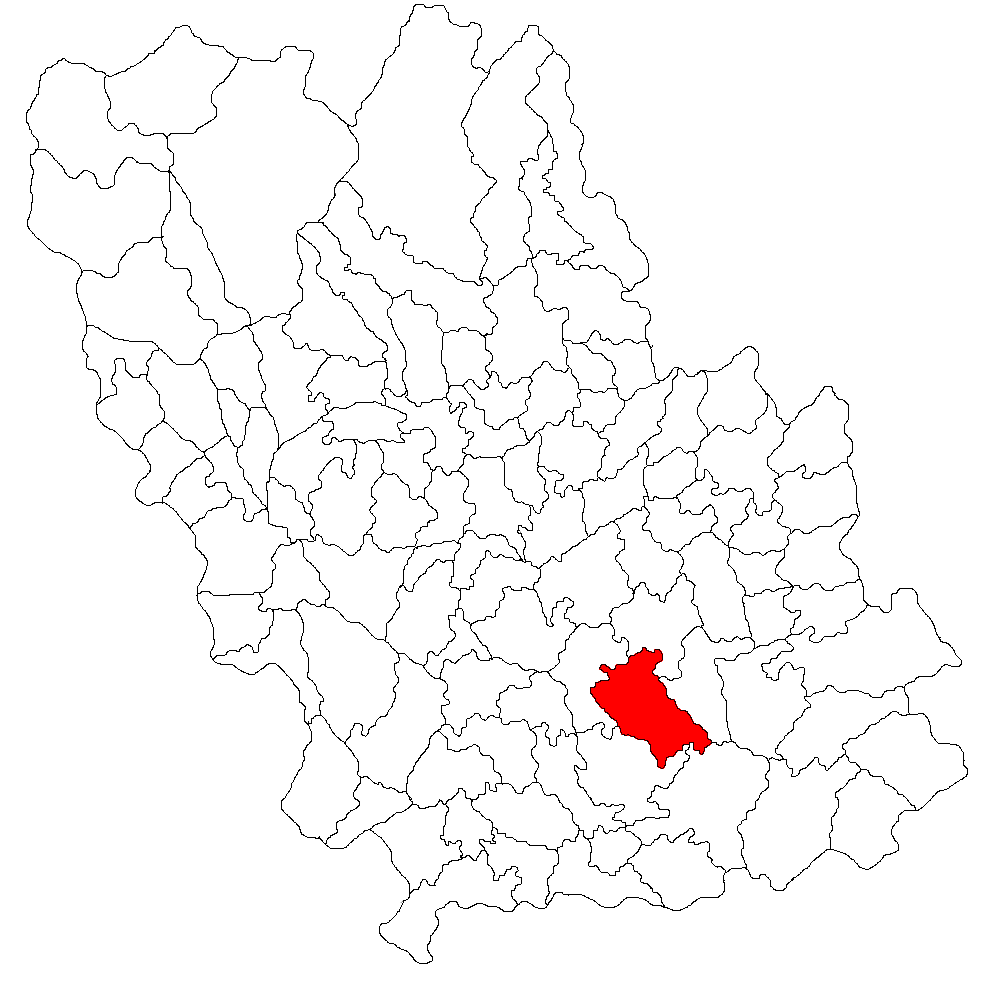
- Location in Prahova County

- Location in Romania
- Coordinates: 44°57′N 26°13′E
- Country: Romania
- County: Prahova

Government
  - Mayor (2020–2024): Marian Panait (PNL)
- Area: 47.28 km^{2} (18.25 sq mi)
- Elevation: 115 m (377 ft)
- Population (2021-12-01): 5,145
  - Density: 108.8/km^{2} (281.8/sq mi)
- Time zone: UTC+02:00 (EET)
  - Summer (DST): UTC+03:00 (EEST)
- Postal code: 107010
- Area code: +(40) 244
- Vehicle reg.: PH
- Website: www.primariaalbestipaleologu.ro

Albești-Paleologu is a commune in Prahova County, Muntenia, Romania. It is composed of four villages: Albești-Muru, Albești-Paleologu, Cioceni and Vadu Părului.

The commune is located in the south-central part of the county, on the banks of the river Cricovul Sărat.

Historical population
Year	Pop.	±%
1992	6,035	—
2002	5,792	−4.0%
2011	5,683	−1.9%
2021	5,145	−9.5%
Source: Census data
