= Gornet-Cricov =

- Commune
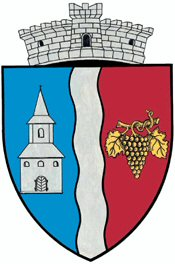
- Coat of arms

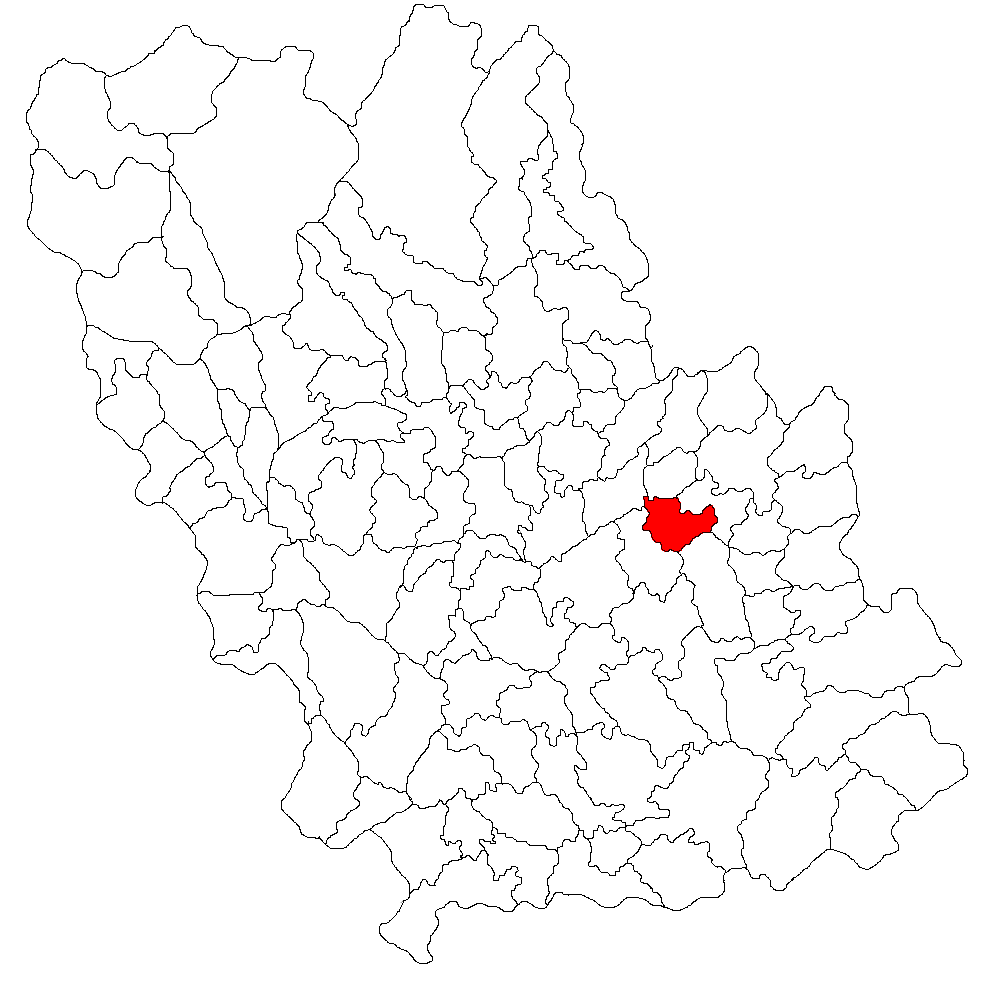
- Location in Prahova County

- Location in Romania
- Coordinates: 45°05′N 26°16′E
- Country: Romania
- County: Prahova

Government
  - Mayor (2020–2024): Ion Călin (PNL)
- Area: 27.94 km^{2} (10.79 sq mi)
- Elevation: 159 m (522 ft)
- Population (2021-12-01): 1,976
  - Density: 71/km^{2} (180/sq mi)
- Time zone: EET/EEST (UTC+2/+3)
- Postal code: 107290
- Area code: +(40) 244
- Vehicle reg.: PH
- Website: primariagornetcricov.ro

Gornet-Cricov is a commune in Prahova County, Muntenia, Romania. It had a population of 1,976 as of 2021 and is composed of six villages: Coșerele, Dobrota, Gornet-Cricov, Priseaca, Țărculești, and Valea Seacă.

About 771 hectares of natural forest exist on its territory.

Historical population
Year	Pop.	±%
1992	2,905	—
2002	2,695	−7.2%
2011	2,318	−14.0%
2021	1,976	−14.8%
Source: Census data
