= Podenii Noi =

- Commune
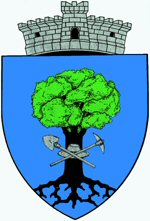
- Coat of arms

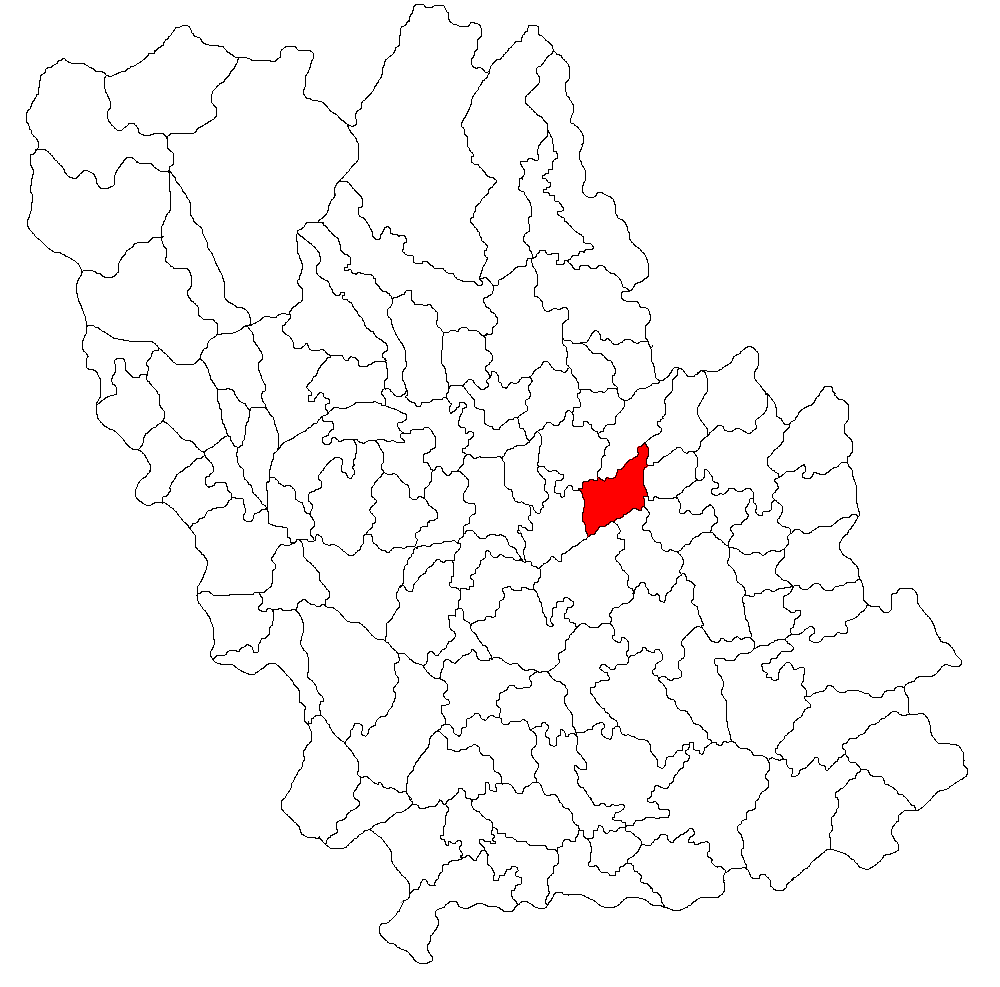
- Location in Prahova County

- Location in Romania
- Coordinates: 45°7′N 26°10′E
- Country: Romania
- County: Prahova

Government
  - Mayor (2020–2024): Mihai Alionte (PSD)
- Area: 37.57 km^{2} (14.51 sq mi)
- Elevation: 179 m (587 ft)
- Population (2021-12-01): 4,590
  - Density: 122/km^{2} (316/sq mi)
- Time zone: UTC+02:00 (EET)
  - Summer (DST): UTC+03:00 (EEST)
- Postal code: 107410
- Area code: +(40) 244
- Vehicle reg.: PH
- Website: primariapodeniinoi.ro

Podenii Noi is a commune in Prahova County, Muntenia, Romania. It is composed of ten villages: Ghiocel, Mehedința, Nevesteasca, Podenii Noi, Podu lui Galben, Popești, Rahova, Sălcioara, Sfăcăru, and Valea Dulce.

== Demographics ==
Historical population
Year	Pop.	±%
1992	4,783	—
2002	4,725	−1.2%
2011	4,860	+2.9%
2021	4,590	−5.6%
Source: Census data

According to the 2021 census, Podenii Noi had a population of 4,590; of those, 89.13% were Romanians and 4.47% Roma.
