= Ion Luca Caragiale National College (Ploiești) =

School in Ploiești, Romania

Coordinates: 44.9453°N 26.0262°E

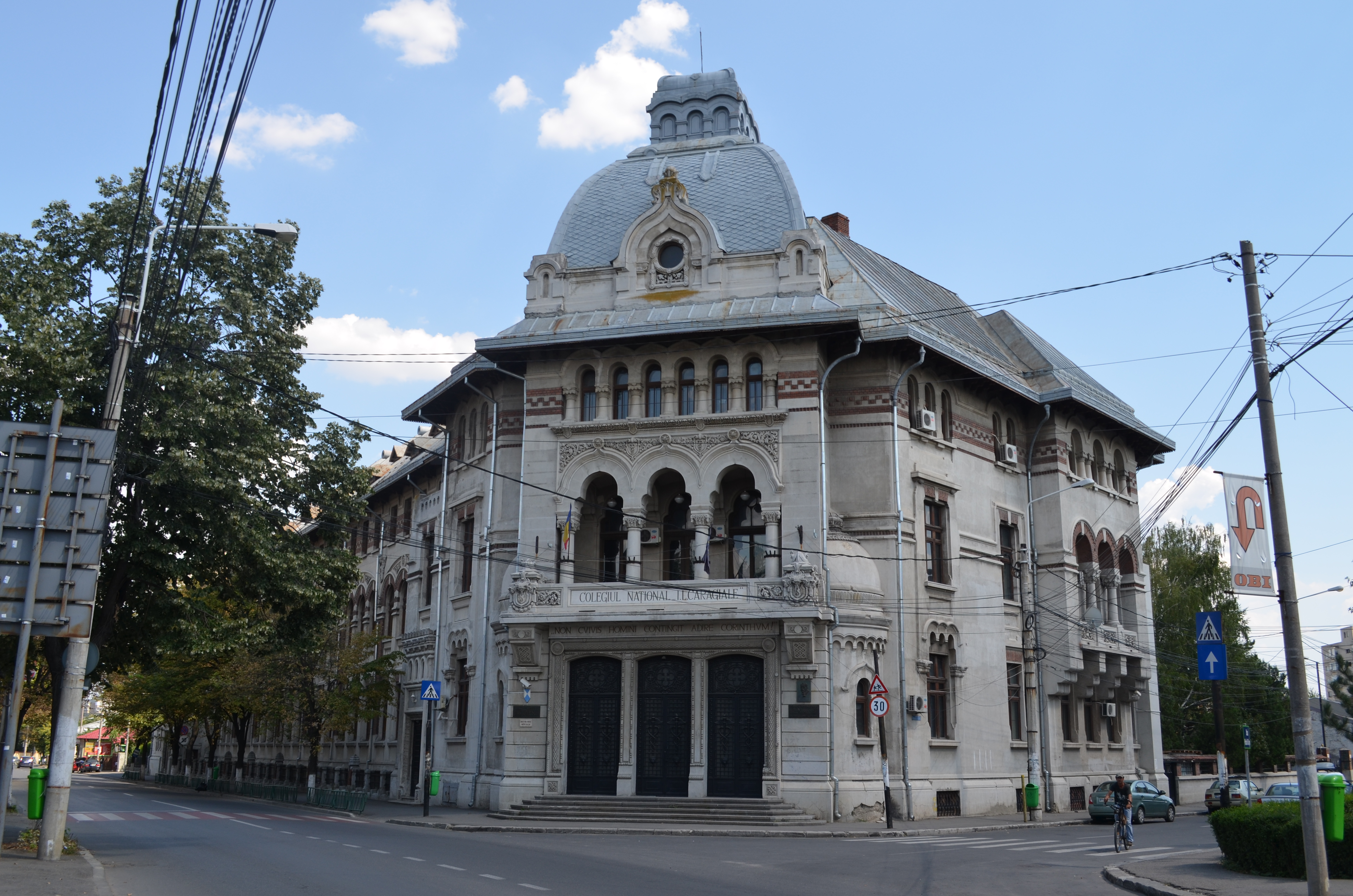
Ion Luca Caragiale National College in Ploiești. Engraved above the entrance is the school's motto, NON CUIVIS HOMINI CONTINGIT ADIRE CORINTHUM, which translates into "Not everyone succeeds in getting to Corinth" a famous quote by Horace that symbolises the exclusivity that is offered by attending.

Ion Luca Caragiale National College (Romanian: Colegiul Național Ion Luca Caragiale) is a high school located at 98 Gheorghe Doja Street, Ploiești, Romania.

The school traces its origins to the boys' gymnasium that opened in 1864. A first grade of nineteen pupils was quickly joined by a second of eighteen. The first dedicated school building, designed by Alexandru Orăscu, was started in 1865 and completed the following year. In 1866, the school was named for Saints Peter and Paul, after an old church nearby. The gymnasium operated for fourteen years, including during the Romanian War of Independence, when a Russian chapel was installed in the schoolyard beneath a large white tent. The school year was divided into trimesters, each of which ended in an examination. By 1876–1877, there were 23 subjects being taught, divided into twelve departments, each with its own chairman.

The institution became a high school in 1878. A new building, started in 1895, was opened in 1898; it was a source of pride for the city's residents. In 1944, during World War II, it suffered severe damage as a result of Allied bombing. In 1948, under the new communist regime, the school moved into the Commercial School Palace. With the closure of other institutions, it became the only high school in Ploiești and all of Prahova County. In 1952, for the centenary of his birth, it was renamed for playwright Ion Luca Caragiale. Girls were first admitted in 1956. Under Nicolae Ceaușescu, 12th grade was restored in 1965–1966; in 1977, its stated focus became mathematics and physics. It was declared a national college in 1997.

The current school building, which dates to 1936, is listed as a historic monument by Romania's Ministry of Culture and Religious Affairs, as are its two predecessors.

The school currently has a gym, boarding rooms, an open air amphitheatre, handball field, basketball field, ping-pong tables, a track, an auditorium and a cafeteria.

== Alumni ==
- Fory Etterle
- Remus Opriș
- Eugen Simion
- Ion Luca Caragiale
- Nichita Stănescu
- Andrei Rădulescu
- Mihai Drăgănescu
- Paul Constantinescu
- Grigore Tocilescu
- Constantin Ion Parhon
- Ștefan Gh. Nicolau
- Iosif Iser
- Geo Bogza
- Octav Doicescu
- Petre Paul Negulescu
- Ticu Dumitrescu
- Nicolae Simache
