= Salcia, Prahova =

Salcia
- Commune
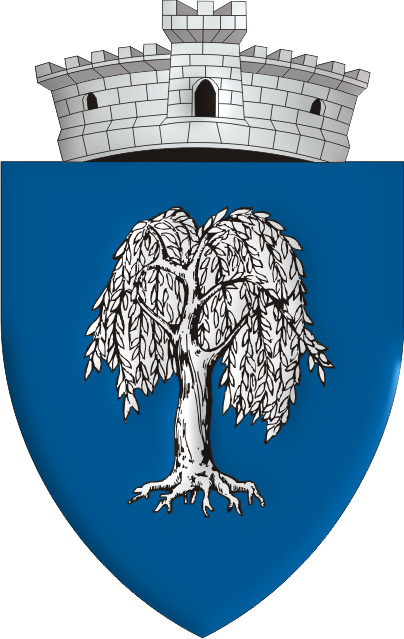
- Coat of arms

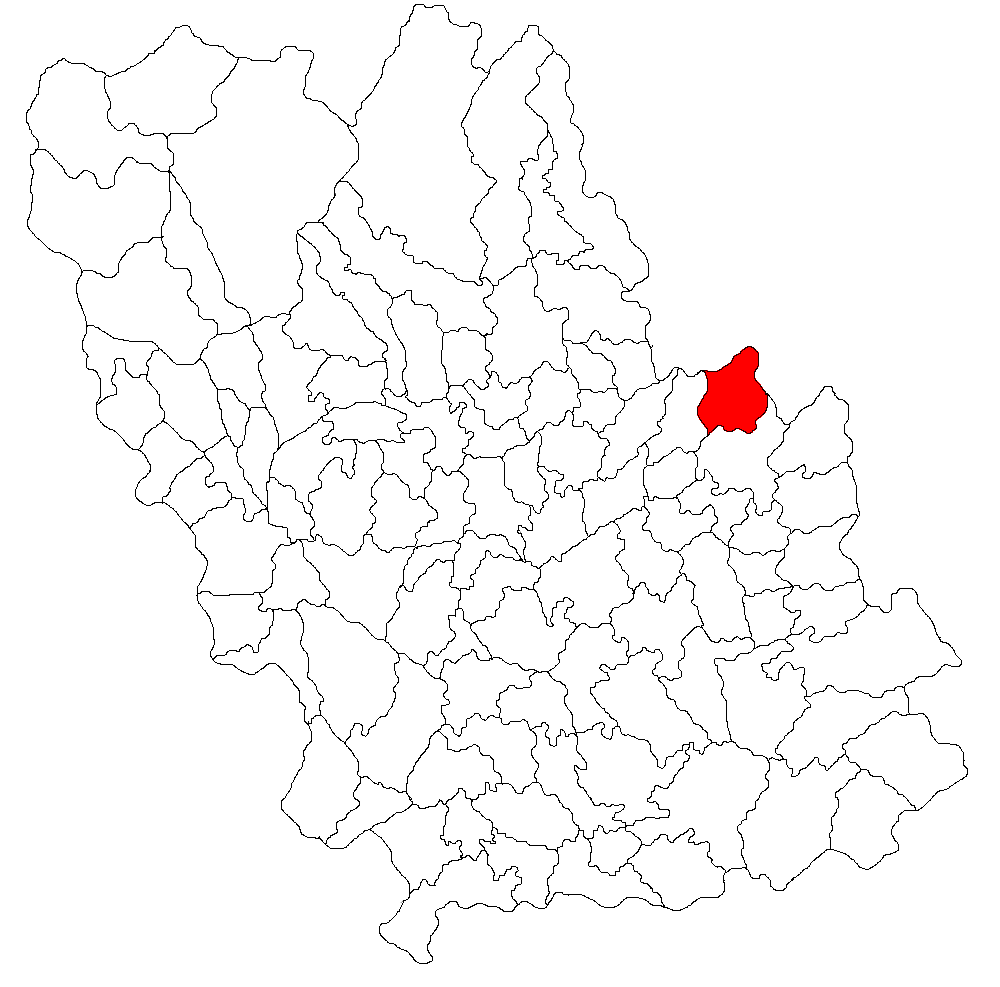
- Location in Prahova County

- Location in Romania
- Coordinates: 45°11′N 26°18′E
- Country: Romania
- County: Prahova

Government
  - Mayor (2020–2024): Iulian-Marian Gherghe (PNL)
- Area: 21.6 km^{2} (8.3 sq mi)
- Elevation: 462 m (1,516 ft)
- Population (2021-12-01): 843
  - Density: 39/km^{2} (100/sq mi)
- Time zone: EET/EEST (UTC+2/+3)
- Postal code: 107505
- Area code: +(40) 244
- Vehicle reg.: PH
- Website: primaria-salcia.ro

Salcia is a commune in Prahova County, Muntenia, Romania. It is composed of a single village, Salcia.

Historical population
Year	Pop.	±%
1992	1,452	—
2002	1,218	−16.1%
2011	1,171	−3.9%
2021	843	−28.0%
Source: Census data
