= Păcureți =

- Commune
- Coat of arms

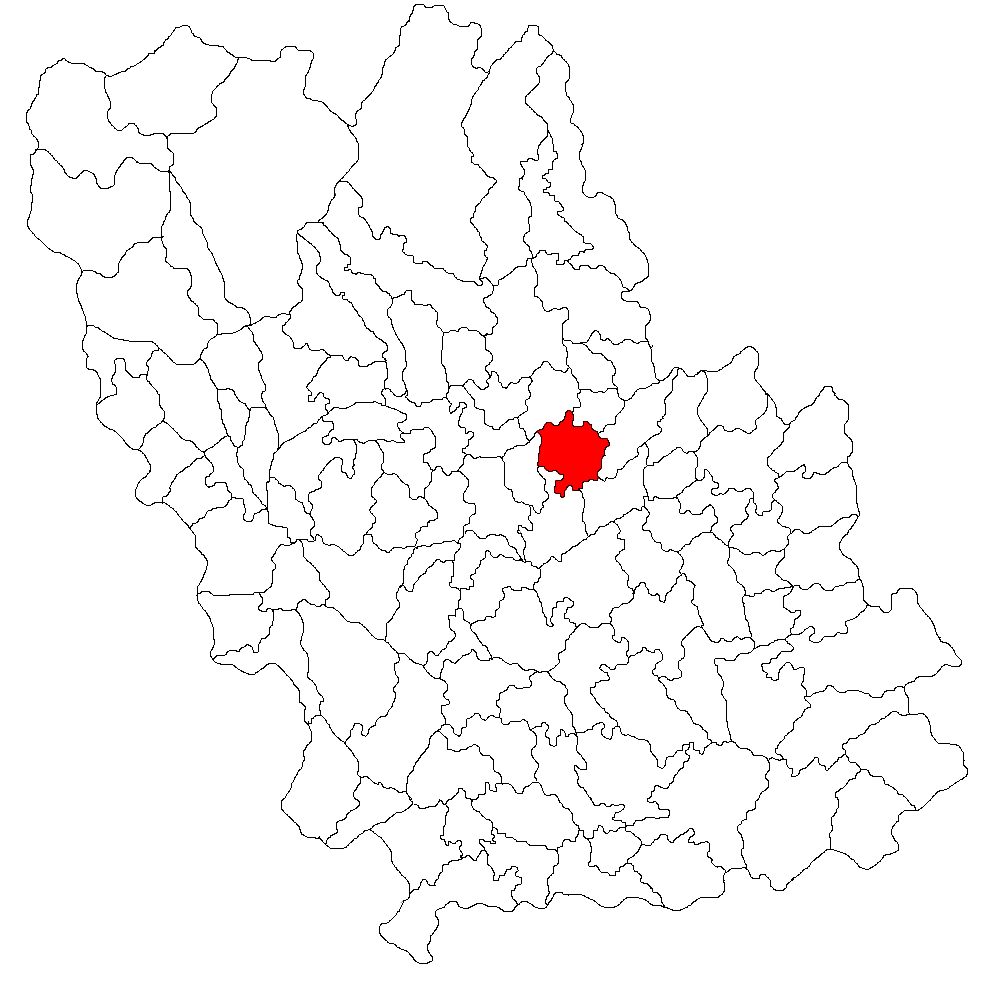
- Location in Prahova County

- Location in Romania
- Coordinates: 45°9′N 26°8′E
- Country: Romania
- County: Prahova

Government
  - Mayor (2024–2028): Ionuț-Georgian Voicu (PNL)
- Elevation: 379 m (1,243 ft)
- Population (2021-12-01): 1,754
- Time zone: EET/EEST (UTC+2/+3)
- Postal code: 107395
- Area code: +(40) 244
- Vehicle reg.: PH
- Website: primaria-pacureti.ro

Păcureți is a commune in Prahova County, Muntenia, Romania. It is composed of five villages: Bărzila, Curmătura, Matița, Păcureți, and Slavu.

Historical population
Year	Pop.	±%
1992	2,399	—
2002	2,289	−4.6%
2011	2,149	−6.1%
2021	1,754	−18.4%
Source: Census data
