= Tomșani, Prahova =

Tomșani
- Commune
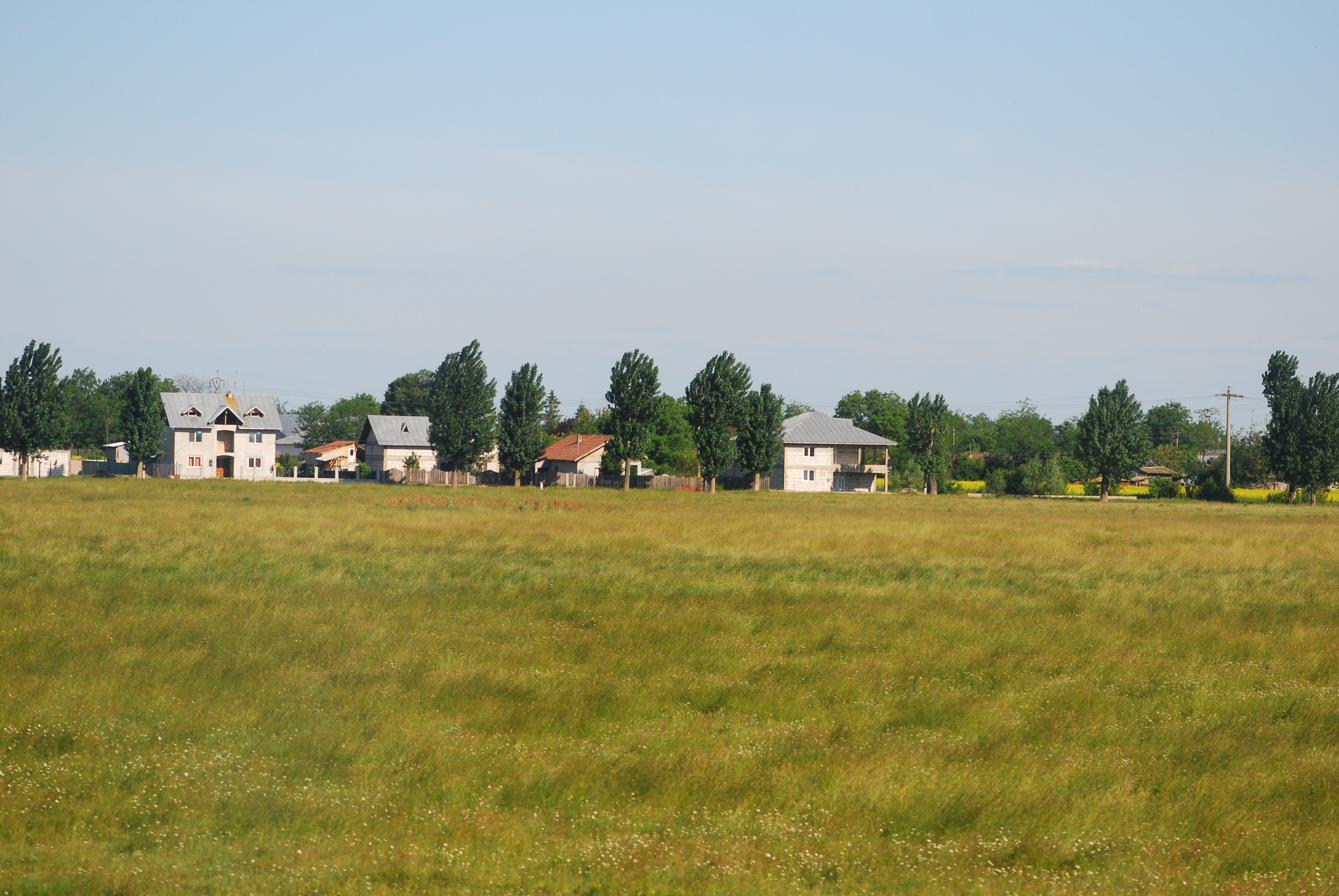
- Tomșani village

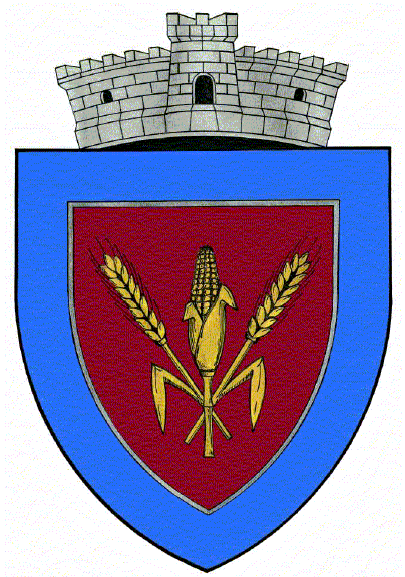
- Coat of arms

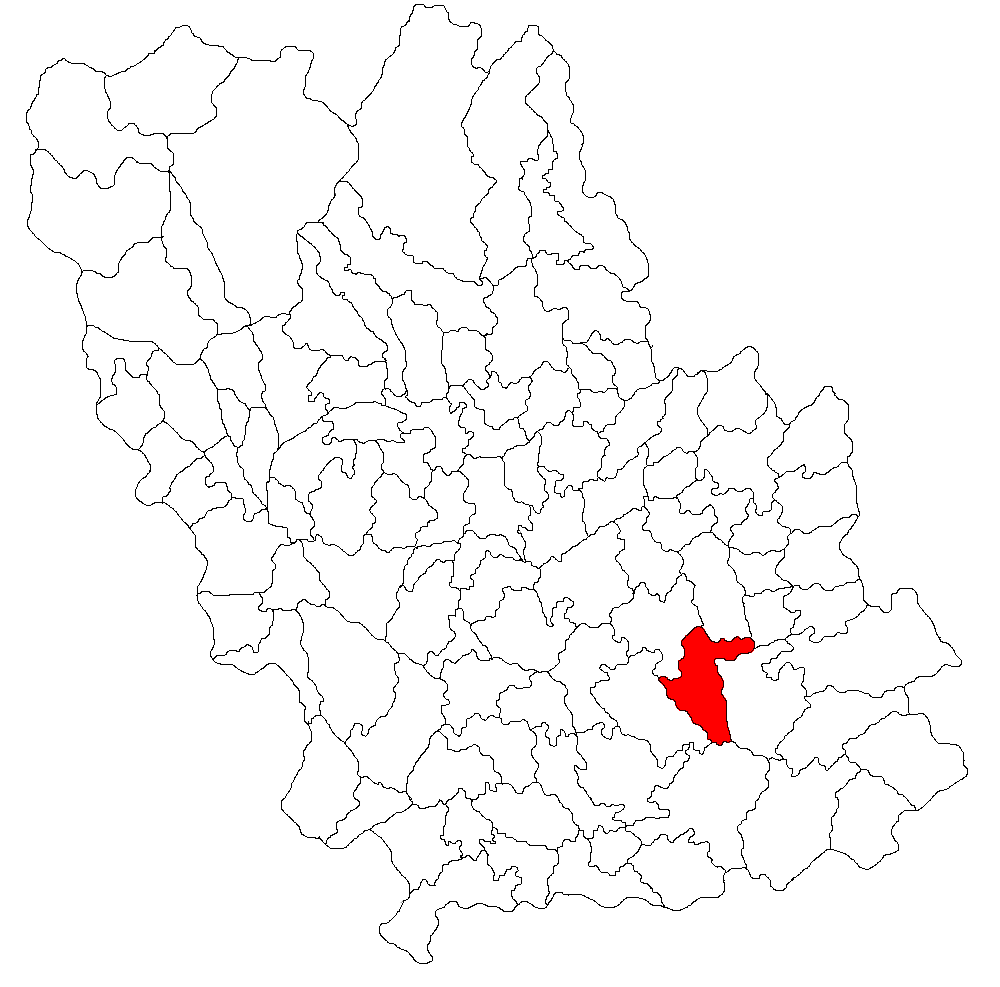
- Location in Prahova County

- Location in Romania
- Coordinates: 44°56′N 26°18′E
- Country: Romania
- County: Prahova

Government
  - Mayor (2024–2028): Mihai-Florin Pelin (PSD)
- Area: 44.56 km^{2} (17.20 sq mi)
- Elevation: 105 m (344 ft)
- Population (2021-12-01): 3,908
  - Density: 87.70/km^{2} (227.1/sq mi)
- Time zone: UTC+02:00 (EET)
  - Summer (DST): UTC+03:00 (EEST)
- Postal code: 107615
- Area code: +(40) 244
- Vehicle reg.: PH
- Website: www.primariatomsani.ro

Tomșani is a commune in Prahova County, Muntenia, Romania. It is composed of four villages: Loloiasca, Magula, Sătucu, and Tomșani.

Historical population
Year	Pop.	±%
1992	4,658	—
2002	4,631	−0.6%
2011	4,461	−3.7%
2021	3,908	−12.4%
Source: Census data

== Natives ==
- Alexandru Antemireanu (1877–1910), poet, prose writer, and literary critic
