= Sângeru =

- Commune
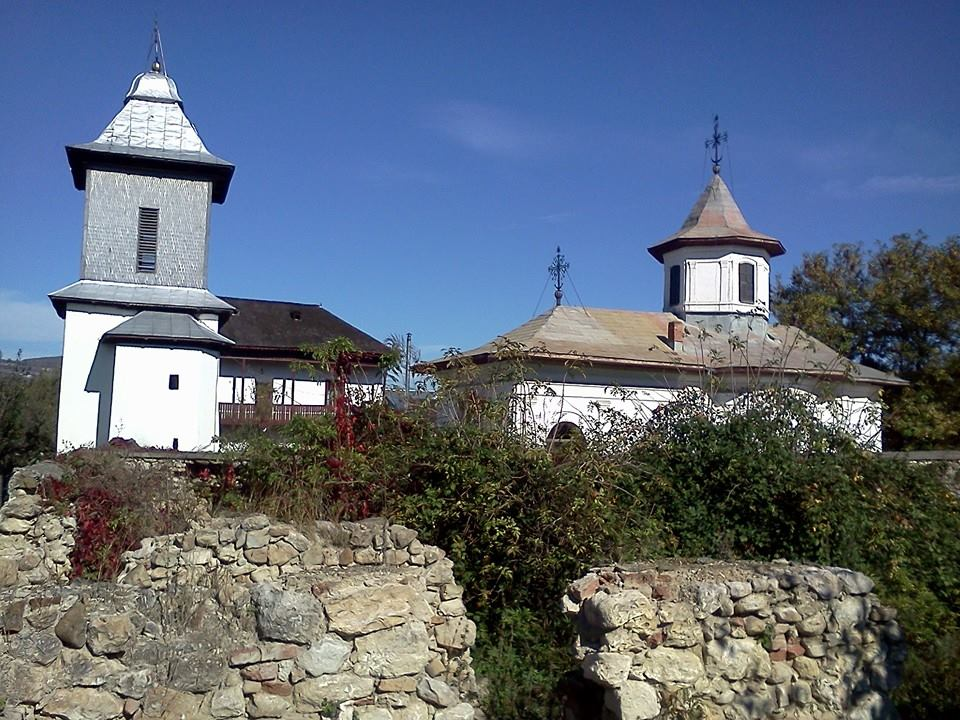
- Bozianu manor in Sângeru

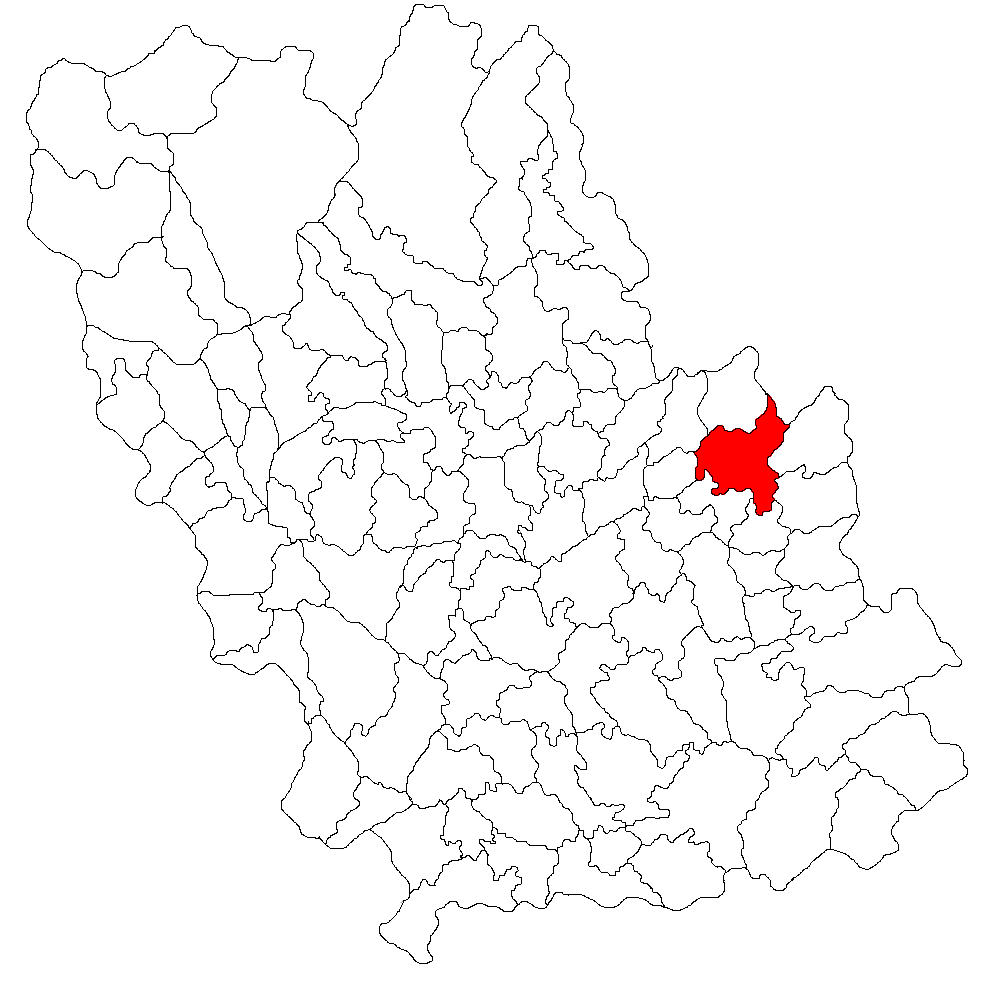
- Location in Prahova County

- Location in Romania
- Coordinates: 45°08′N 26°21′E
- Country: Romania
- County: Prahova

Government
  - Mayor (2020–2024): Gheorghe Radu (PSD)
- Area: 39.9 km^{2} (15.4 sq mi)
- Elevation: 219 m (719 ft)
- Population (2021-12-01): 5,230
  - Density: 131/km^{2} (339/sq mi)
- Time zone: UTC+02:00 (EET)
  - Summer (DST): UTC+03:00 (EEST)
- Postal code: 107515
- Area code: +(40) 244
- Vehicle reg.: PH
- Website: sangeru.europrahova.eu

Sângeru is a commune in Prahova County, Muntenia, Romania. It is composed of six villages: Butuci, Mireșu Mare, Mireșu Mic, Piatra Mică, Sângeru, and Tisa.

The commune is located in the eastern part of the county, 38 km (24 mi) northeast of the county seat, Ploiești, on the border with Buzău County.

Historical population
Year	Pop.	±%
1992	5,316	—
2002	5,367	+1.0%
2011	5,449	+1.5%
2021	5,230	−4.0%
Source: Census data

== Village museum ==
The village museum is found in the manor raised during the second half of the 18th century by the boyar Andrei Bozianu, Treasurer and later High Steward in the assembly. The well preserved building is representative for the rural residential architecture from the end of the Romanian Middle Ages. The edifice with massive walls was built out of stone masonry alternating with brick. In the first of the four rooms of the edifice there is a presentation of the historical evolution of the village community illustrated by archaeological finds attesting that the area was inhabited from the Bronze Age and during the "classical" Geto-Dacian period (the 3rd-1st centuries BC) and the 1st millennium AD (the 2nd - 3rd and 5th - 7th centuries AD). A series of documents, artifacts and photographs attempt a reconstruction of the economic, social and cultural life of the commune from the first mention (the 18th century) up to the 20th century. The following two rooms are dedicated to the presentation of the specific ethnography of the area: costumes, trades, etc. In the last room various religious items: rare church books, icons, ecclesiastical objects and sacerdotal attire, etc. attempt at presenting the spiritual life of the village; most of these pieces belong to the Parishes of Sângeru and Mireș, that gave this heritage in custody, in order to be presented in an exhibition.
