= Ovid (disambiguation) =

Ovid or Ovidius (43 BC–17 AD) was a Roman poet. His name is used as a male first name, especially in Romance languages, often in variations such as Ovidi, Ovídio, Ovidio, or Ouvidu, and in some recent usage shortened to Ovi. It may refer to:

== Places ==
=== United States ===
- Ovid, Colorado
- Ovid, Idaho
- Ovid, Michigan, a city in Clinton County, Michigan
- Ovid Township, Branch County, Michigan
- Ovid Township, Clinton County, Michigan
- Ovid, Missouri
- Ovid (town), New York
- Ovid (village), New York

=== Elsewhere ===
- Ovidiu, Romania
- Ovidiu Island, Romania
- Ovidiopol, Ukraine

== Persons ==
=== Saint ===
- Saint Ovidius (died 135), Portuguese saint

=== Surname ===
- Juventinus Albius Ovidius, Roman poet, probably of the late 2nd century

=== Given name ===
- Ovid Butler (1801–1881), American attorney, newspaper publisher, abolitionist, and university founder
- Ovid S. Crohmălniceanu (1921–2000), Romanian literary critic and science fiction writer
- Ovid Demaris (1919–1998), American journalist and novelist
- Ovid Densusianu (1873–1938), Romanian poet
- Ovid Glasgow (born 1945), Guyanese cricketer
- Ovid Jackson (born 1939), Canadian politician
- Ovid F. Johnson (1807–1854), American lawyer and politician
- Ovid Nicholson (1888–1968), American baseball player
- Ovid C. Lewis (1932–2011), American academic and university administrator
- Ovid R. Sellers (1884–1975), American biblical scholar and archaeologist
- Ovid Tzeng (born 1944), Taiwanese politician
- Ovidi Montllor (1942–1995), Valencian singer-songwriter and actor
- Ovidio (name)
- Ovidiu (name)

== Other ==
- Ovid Technologies, vendor of online bibliographic databases and academic journals, chiefly in health sciences
- Ovid Napa Valley, winery in Napa Valley, California
- Lake Ovid, Michigan
- Ovid (crater), crater on Mercury
