= List of prisons in Romania =

Some prisons in Romania formerly housed political prisoners, both during successive dictatorships of 1938–1944 and during the subsequent Communist regime. As of 2016 there are 45 prisons under the control of the Ministry of Justice, housing about 27,600 prisoners.

Prison	Image	Opening/Closing date	City or Town	Description
Aiud Prison		Constructed in the 1800s	Aiud, Alba County	The prison is operated by the Ministry of Justice.
Bright Light (CIA)			Bucharest	The prison is operated as a black site by the Central Intelligence Agency.
Doftana Prison		1895 to about 1945	Doftana, a village in Telega commune, Prahova County	"The Romanian Bastille": housed communist political prisoners and others
Gherla Prison		1785	Gherla	Maximum security prison
Jilava Prison		Converted from a fort in 1907	Jilava commune, Ilfov County	The prison was created from a converted fort built by Carol I of Romania. Adrian Nastase, former Prime Minister of Romania, was held in Jilava prison for 8 months of a 2-year sentence.
Pitești Prison		about 1942–1952	Pitești	Political prison: scene of abusive re-education practices 1949–51
Râmnicu Sărat Prison		1901-1963	Râmnicu Sărat	Political prison both before and during the Communist regime
Sighet prison		1897: is now Sighet Memorial Museum	Sighetu Marmației	Held political prisoners in the early part of the Communist regime
Târgșor Prison		Built in 1857 for a monastery, it was converted in 1882 into a prison	Târgșoru Nou, Ariceștii Rahtivani, Prahova County	From 1948 to 1952, it held children and political prisoners; it now serves as a women's prison
Name	Image	Date	Place	Description
