= Bright Lights =

Bright Lights may refer to:

== Film and television ==
- Bright Lights (1916 film), a silent short starring Fatty Arbuckle
- Bright Lights (1925 film), an MGM film starring Charles Ray and directed by Robert Z. Leonard
- Bright Lights (1928 film), a Disney silent animated short
- Bright Lights (1930 film), a musical comedy shot in Technicolor
- Bright Lights (1935 film), a film starring Joe E. Brown and Ann Dvorak
- Bright Lights, a 1924 film featuring Jay Belasco
- Bright Lights, a 2006 short film featuring Hanna R. Hall
- "Bright Lights", a 1986 four-part serial in the children's TV series My Little Pony
- Bright Lights Film Journal, an online journal of film criticism
- Bright Lights: Starring Carrie Fisher and Debbie Reynolds, a 2016 documentary

== Music ==
- The Brightlights, British indie rock band
- Bright Lights (Ellie Goulding album), the 2010 re-release of Lights
- Bright Lights (Showaddywaddy album), 1980
- Bright Lights (Susanna Hoffs album), 2021
- "Bright Lights" (Matchbox Twenty song), 2003
- "Bright Lights" (Placebo song), 2010
- "Bright Lights" (Tinchy Stryder song), 2012
- "Bright Lights" (The Killers song), 2024
- "Bright Lights", a song by Gary Clark, Jr. from the album Blak and Blu, 2012
- "Bright Lights", a song by Thirty Seconds to Mars from the album Love, Lust, Faith and Dreams, 2013
- Bright Lights, the alias and album project of Heather Bright
- The Bright Lights, an EP by This Providence

== See also ==
- Bright Light (disambiguation)
- Bright Lights, Big City (disambiguation)
