= Târgșoru =

Târgșoru may refer to one of two places in Prahova County, Romania:

- Târgșoru Vechi
- Târgșoru Nou, a village in Ariceștii Rahtivani Commune
