= Re-education in Communist Romania =

Re-education in Romanian communist prisons was a series of processes initiated after the establishment of the communist regime at the end of World War II that targeted people who were considered hostile to the Romanian Communist Party, primarily members of the fascist Iron Guard, as well as other political prisoners, both from established prisons and from labor camps. The purpose of the process was the indoctrination of the hostile elements with the Marxist–Leninist ideology, that would lead to the crushing of any active or passive resistance movement. Reeducation was either non-violent – e.g., via communist propaganda – or violent, as it was done at the Pitești and Gherla prisons.

== Theoretical background ==
Philosopher Mircea Stănescu claimed that the theoretical foundation for the communist version of the reeducation process was provided by the principles defined by Anton Semioniovici Makarenko, a Russian educator born in Ukraine in 1888. This claim was disputed by historian Mihai Demetriade, who indicated that there is "no link or resemblance, neither structural nor causal with the works of the psychologist and educator Makarenko". Demetriade further indicated that the claim is mainly associated with the groups around the fascist Iron Guard, and had been publicly promoted by anti-communist activist Virgil Ierunca.

Mircea Stănescu also asserted that another important factor was the definition of morality itself and that Lenin had reportedly stated any action that seeks the welfare of the party is considered moral, while any action that harms it is immoral. As such, moral itself is a relative concept, it follows the needs of the group. A certain attitude shall be regarded as moral at a given time, while immoral at another moment; in order to decide, the person must respect the program as defined by the collective (the party).

Mihai Demetriade observed that violence within Iron Guard groups was rather common, both in public (such as the ritual murder of Mihai Stelescu), as well as in camps where many were imprisoned after the 1941 Legionnaires' rebellion and Bucharest pogrom. A notable case was the group of Iron Guard members interned in Rostock after the failed rebellion: a suspected traitor was severely tortured by its colleagues, the process being very similar to the one applied later in Pitești and Suceava. Demetriade concludes that torture and violence was part of the "Guardist anatomy" and "the prison administration created a favourable context for it to develop".

== Context ==
In March 1949, the Operational Service (OS) was constituted, this being the first designation of prison security (securitate), on the initiative of Gheorghe Pintilie, head of the Securitate. Its first commander was Iosif Nemeș. The Operational Service was subordinated to the Securitate, and not to the General Penitentiary Directorate (GPD). The GPD was handling the administrative responsibilities, under direct watch of the Securitate, while the OS was responsible with gathering intelligence from the political prisoners. After the entire intelligence structure was completed, the information flow was as follows: once retrieved from the informants, it reached the political officer of the incarceration unit, who personally handed them to the head of the OS. The data were analyzed and the summary, together with the original files, were handed over to the Securitate.

After the installment of the communist regime, the prison system went through a transition period. Up to 1947, the detention regime was rather light, as the political prisoners were entitled to receive home packages, books, were granted access to discuss with family and even organize cultural events. Gradually, the Securitate harshened the conditions, as the entire mechanism grew more solid. The old guards were replaced with new ones, adapted to the new society, the detention regime got rougher, beatings and torture during inquiry became common practice, together with mock trials.

The inquiries started there, at Suceava – as previously mentioned – in a hellish environment; you could not rest at night because of the beaten women screaming, inquired; the screams of those tortured, brought unconscious in the cell, livid, with shattered soles. It was infernal!

— Interview with a former political prisoner, under protection of anonymity, by M. Stănescu

At first, the main target during the investigation were members of the Iron Guard and of former historical parties. Later, they were joined by those who opposed collectivization, who tried to illegally cross the border, members of resistance and, generally, opposers of the regime, even in nonviolent ways. Mircea Stănescu asserts that the communist regime did not consider imprisonment as a form of penitence, but a method of elimination from the social and political life, and, eventually, as a political reeducation environment.

== Detention centers ==
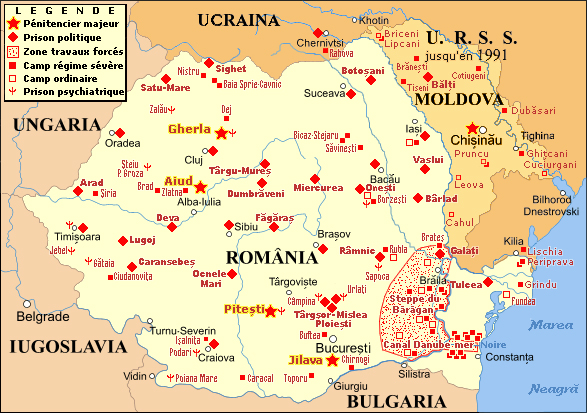
Repressive system in Romania and Moldova, 1946–1989

The main detention centers dedicated to the re-education of political prisoners in Communist Romania were at Suceava, Pitești, Gherla, Târgu Ocna, Târgșor, Brașov, Ocnele Mari, and Peninsula. These re-education penitentiaries were characterized by the application of torture methods in order to convert the detainees to the communist ideology.

=== Suceava ===
Suceava prison was a detention place for Iron Guard members located in northern and central Moldavia, many of whom arrived here following the massive arrests from the night of 14–15 May 1948. From within the prisoners group, the first to approach the reeducation concept were Alexandru Bogdanovici and Eugen Țurcanu. Bogdanovici had a long history of legionnaire activity: first arrested in 1943; he was sentenced to 6 years correctional detention; the second sentence – three years – was received in 1945, for taking part in the Ciucaș Mountains resistance. On his last arrest, in 1948, he was practically leader of the Iron Guard Student Community in Iași. Eugen Țurcanu was arrested on 3 July 1948, after he was reported taking part to Iron Guard meetings and as a member of the Câmpulung Moldovenesc Iron Guard Brotherhood (FDC 36 Câmpulung).

Although at this time the inquiries of the Siguranța (acting as political police and soon to be reorganized into the Department of State Security after the NKVD model) were already violent in nature, the Suceava reeducation process itself began as non-violent. Initiated by Bogdanovici in October 1948, it consisted of: communist propaganda among Iron Guard prisoners, anti-Iron Guard propaganda, papers based on the historical materialism theses, lectures from works by Lenin and the history of the Soviet Union, creation of poetry and songs with communist undertone. Țurcanu even created an Organization for Detainees with Communist Beliefs (ODCB), whose structure was modeled based on the Communist Party, and all the supporters of the reeducation were registered. Finally, the process extended through the prison, every cell containing its own reeducation committee, responsible for the action coordination.

Aside from Bogdanovici and Țurcanu, of those that initiated the action at Suceava and became more involved in other prisons, several stood out: Constantin Bogoș, Virgil Bordeianu, Alexandru Popa, Mihai Livinschi, Maximilian Sobolevski, Vasile Pușcașu, Dan Dumitrescu, and Nicolae Cobâlaș. The motivations behind these ex-legionnaires switching sides were varied, but generally included the hope of getting a lesser punishment after the initial "generous" retribution and obtaining several amenities while incarcerated (packages from home, mail, etc.) Up to 100 prisoners joined the reeducation plan by April 1949.

=== Pitești ===
Starting with September–October 1948, Pitești Prison was designated as a detention facility for students who were members of the Iron Guard (legionnaires). The prison warden was Alexandru Dumitrescu. Following the reorganization of the Securitate and the creation of the Operational Service, to each prison an Operational Bureau was designated. The first political officer assigned to Pitești was Ion Marina.

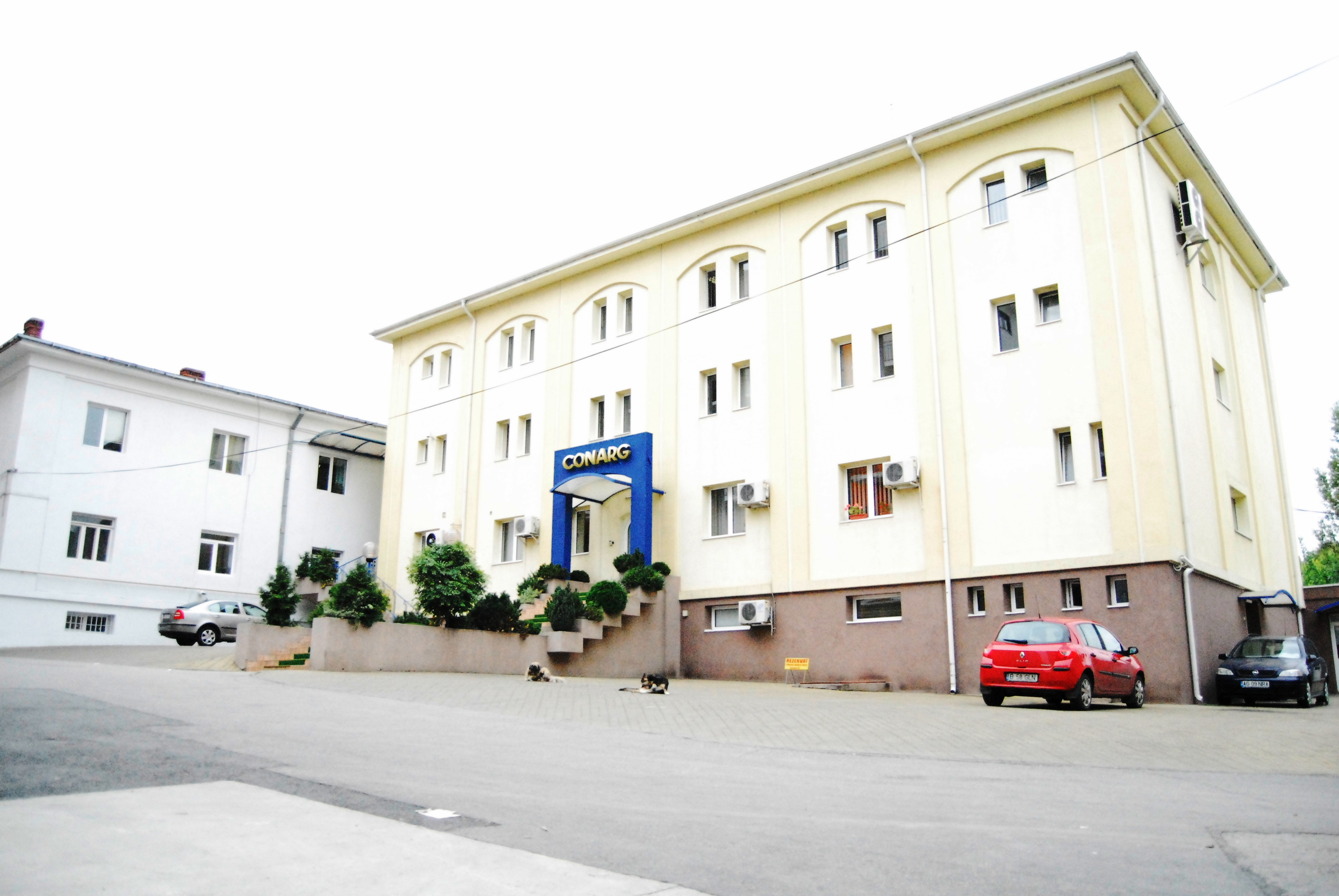
Pitești Prison, location of the violent reeducation, now a privately owned property

Țurcanu and the group he was part of were moved to Pitești from Suceava on 21 April 1949. Țurcanu became in time an informant of the Operational Bureau, being supported by Iosif Nemes, head of the Operational Service. Aware that non-violent reeducation methods were not efficient, as the legionnaire students were refusing to affiliate to the communist agenda and the intelligence data was scarce, a violent reeducation program is initiated, at the direct proposal of Țurcanu and Marina.

The Pitești detention regime was optimal for such an initiative. In the second part of 1949, the conditions worsened considerably: the prison sections were isolated and the communication channels between the inmates cut off. The cells were over-crowded and the food had a low caloric content. (maximum 1,000 calories per day). There was little to no medical assistance, the sanitary program was done on a group basis, many did not get to the toilet in the allocated time and had to do it in their own food tins, which had to be later washed. Beatings from the guardians were common and the most severe penalties included the solitary ("casimca"), a small isolation cell, without light of ventilation, extremely cold in winter, while the floor was flooded with water and urine. As the program progressed, exterior walls were built around the prison, and within the penitentiary perimeter, the inside and outside yards, so far separated by barbed wire fences, were now completely isolated by concrete walls.

Violent reeducation began on 25 November 1949, in cell 1 correction, on the initiative of a group led by Țurcanu. The reeducation ensemble and torture methods were perfected in time, but the process itself did not change. At first, two groups were moved into the same room: the reeducation device (shock group) and the target group. Apportionment of detainees inside the prison cells was done based on the political officer's indications.

Prior to this assembly, through the prisons informant network (of which the reeducation ensemble was part of), compromising data was gathered on the victims, such as Legionnaire membership, information they hid during the inquiry, anti-communist activity not declared etc. After a relative calm exploratory period, during which the target group members were questioned concerning their attitude towards the iron-guard movement and communist party, they were asked to unmask themselves and adhere to the reeducation movement, violence and torture followed. The violent stage was Makarenko's explosion, and was done collectively.

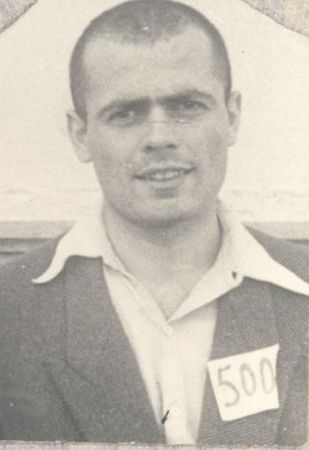
Eugen Țurcanu, leader of the Pitești reeducation action

Beating were ferocious, inmates were clubbed or trampled unconscious, many times unrecognizable after the violent treatment. Tortures were varied; if initially the sole purpose was to humiliate the prisoners, who were forced to wear the toilet bucket on their head, crawl on the floor or eat without using their hands, later it followed to reach an extensive physical wear, which made them more susceptible to crack: they went for days without water, were forced to stay in uneasy positions such as lying down with the head raised and a needle pointing back of the neck or to remove and put back their shoe laces for hours on end; for the resistant ones, a total mental breakdown was attempted, as they were made to eat feces, behave as pigs when food was provided (eat without cutlery and grunt), walk on all fours in circle, each licking the anus of the one in front or behave in obscene and perverted ways during mock religious services.

According to Virgil Ierunca, Christian baptism was gruesomely mocked. Guards chanted baptismal rites as buckets of urine and fecal matter were brought to inmates. The inmate's head was pushed into the raw sewage. His head would remain submerged almost to the point of death. The head was then raised, the inmate allowed to breathe, only to have his head pushed back into the sewage.

Ierunca further states that "prisoners' whole bodies were burned with cigarettes; their buttocks would begin to rot, and their skin fell off as though they suffered from leprosy. Others were forced to swallow spoons of excrement, and when they threw it back up, they were forced to eat their own vomit.

During the shock, after beatings and humiliation, often exercised from those initially considered as friends, detainees were subjected to another disillusion: the administration showed no support whatsoever. Guards frequently took part on the beatings, the wounded received only limited medical care, in the cell, not at the infirmary, and only if they accepted to unmask (denounce) themselves. Frequent inspections found the prisoners severely beaten up, but treated the subject with sarcasm, serving as proof that the events were known to authorities and accepted as such. This way, inmates were notified that they should not expect any help whatsoever, from within or outside the prison walls. Systematic torture continued until the subjects unmasked themselves.

The unmasking process consisted of several phases. First came the external unmasking: the detainee had to confess all his actions that were hostile towards the regime. This phase itself was split into two stages.

- The inside exposure: the person was forced to reveal all the activities aimed against the penitentiary regime and administration, since incarceration. The purpose was to expose all subversive activities and also verify the "correctness" of the prisoner. The process was done in public, under the surveillance of the reeducator, and prisoners had to be actively involved and ask questions in turn.
- The outside exposure: detainees had to reveal their hostile behavior prior to the arrest, especially the actions that may have harmed the interest of the communist party: subversive organizations (the resistance), the activity of the historical parties after their dissolution, acts aimed against the party members during the war, espionage, etc.

The second phase represented the internal unmasking, where an autobiography was requested from the inmates; the degree of defamation it contained was considered directly proportional to the mental shift of the prisoner towards the reeducation program. They had to present their family members as immoral, criminals and incestuous, in public. The anti-regime actions that had them imprisoned were as such presented as being caused by the depraved environment they were educated in.

The third and last phase was the post-unmasking, and it consisted in discussions concerning communist doctrine and practice. While during the first and second phase, the person had to prove the past was left behind and his loyalty stands with the party, the purpose of the third phase was to strengthen the theoretical foundation of this process.

The prisoners who unmasked themselves were enlisted in the reeducation mechanism and forced to beat up/torture on others. Occasionally, they were forced to go through the procedure again: either it was revealed that they did not confess everything or it was considered that they did not "hit strong enough". Țurcanu was the leader of the reeducation group, he decided on site if the prisoners were honest, he delegated the reeducation committees and assigned them to prison cells, was actively engaged in the ongoing violence and the detainees had to confess everything in his presence.

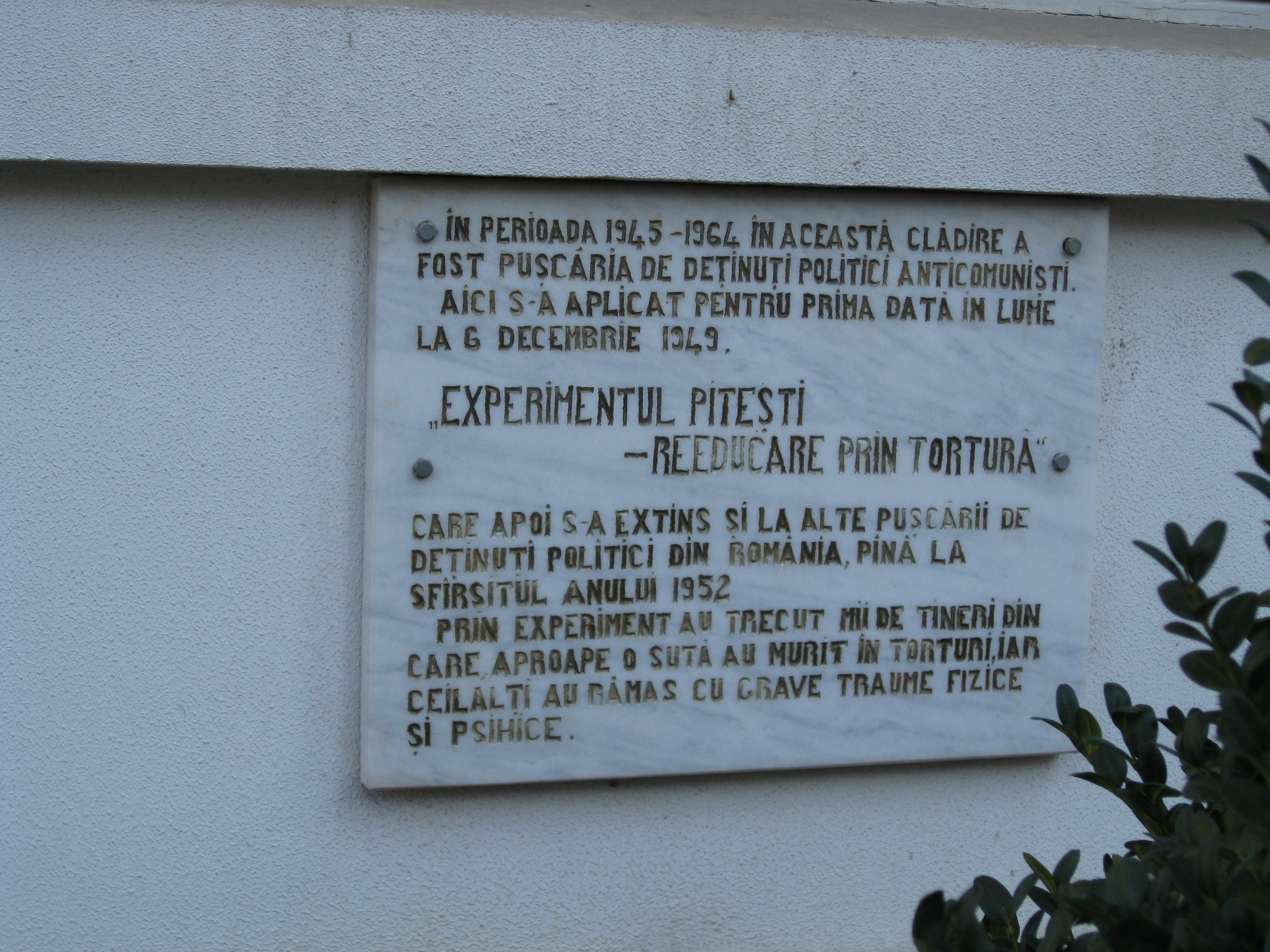
Memorial plaque at the prison entrance

The prison was T-shaped, and the prisoners were detained based on the conviction type: light offences (correction) was set up on the head of the T on the first floor. Those who served long-term convictions or hard labor punishment were assigned on the two sides of the T tail – first floor; those targeted for prison camps were assigned to the ground floor, quarantine was set up in the basement while those in administrative detention – people on whom crime evidence was not strong enough to stand trial. The reeducation process, started in cell 1 correction, was later moved to room 4 hospital – the largest room, it could accommodate over 60 people – this being the main reeducation facility. In time, it will expand to both long term conviction or hard labor punishment sections.

Not able to resist the mental and physical violence, some prisoners tried to commit suicide, by severing their veins. Gheorghe Șerban and Gheorghe Vătășoiu committed suicide by throwing themselves through the opening between the stairways, before safety nets were installed. Many died following the wounds from beatings and tortures. Alexandru Bogdanovici, one of the initiators of the reeducation process at Suceava, was continuously tortured until his death on 15 April 1950, mainly because he was considered to be an opportunist, only seeking a way to get out of detention.

Beginning with 1950, the Operational Service was reorganized, with Tudor Sepeanu replacing Iosif Nemeș. One consequence of this move was that the Pitești political officer, Ion Marina, was replaced by Mihai Mircea. In February 1951, Sepeanu will be in turn replaced by Alexandru Roșianu. These changes will have no consequences on the detention regime, as the reeducation continued halfway in 1951. Within this period, many prisoners that underwent the reeducation process were transferred to other detention centers. The negative publicity surrounding this activity, the official inquiry of July 1951, led by colonel Ludovic Czeller, head of the Administrative Control Body of the DGP, following which most of the Pitești prison staff was dismissed or transferred (warden Alexandru Dumitrescu was replaced by Anton Kovacs) and the relocation of all the Pitești political prisoners to Gherla on 29 August 1951, led to the termination of violent reeducation in this location. The death toll of the Pitești reeducation: 22 dead and over one thousand physically and mentally mutilated prisoners.

=== Târgșor ===
Târgșor Prison was converted to a pupils detention center in 1948. Prior to this, it had been a military prison since 1882. It was divided in two sections, one for the pupils, the other for former policemen and Siguranța members. The first section was reserved for those aged 16–20 years. Initially, the detention conditions were rather light, as they were allowed to receive packages (including books) and money, while once per month a guard was responsible for setting up a shopping list based on the prisoners demands. Food was decent while the prison administration – headed by warden Spirea Dumitrescu – was supportive towards them. After the prison reorganization, a weaving workshop is built, with the purpose of serving as a work reeducation center. Additionally, the administration started lectures based on the works of Marx and Engels. In time, the incarceration conditions deteriorated, reaching the same level as the other Romanian political prisons.

A group of approximately 100 detainees was transferred there from Suceava in August 1949. Of those, more than half already joined the reeducation process. They set up a Reeducation Committee and approached the administration, seeking both support in their actions and retaliation against those who opposed it. By March 1950, they gained control over all the prison key positions, from the storehouse and workshop to the kitchen and post office. A political officer is assigned here, Iancu Burada at first, Dumitru Antonescu later. Joining the reeducation was optional, but came with a series of advantages, while those hostile were either isolated or eliminated from privileged jobs. An organization – named 23 August – is created in a similar structure to the Suceava ODCB, soon counting between 70 – 120 members. Reeducation activities were non-violent, such as reading articles from Scânteia or public readings from communist works.

In July–August 1950, following an inspection from officers of the Securitate and Minister of Internal Affairs, warden Dumitrescu is replaced by captain Valeriu Negulescu, characterized as a "savage beast". The prison section reserved for former police officers is moved to Făgăraș while the incarceration conditions get worse. Books and personal possessions are confiscated, overcoats and gloves were turned in to prevent escapes, daily strolls are seized and food quality diminishes. The new regime – educated at Jilava prison – made no distinction between reeducation followers and opponents, and beatings started.

Such a behavior is displayed after the escape of Ion Lupeș – November 1950 – when the warden aggressed the inmates:

He pulled out the pistol from his pocket, and, with the gun in one hand and a club in the other, he hit like a madman. The guards imitated him with obedience. (...) So that they would not smear their boots, the guards jumped on the inmates, from one to the other, and kept on hitting, until they finally went tired.

— Gheorghe Andreica, Târgșoru Nou, pag. 206

The prison is gradually emptied between October and 20 December 1950. The prisoners were assigned either to the Danube-Black Sea Canal or to Gherla, and some were even set free. Unlike Pitești, the Târgșor reeducation process itself was not violent, for several reasons: being young, the prisoners were not considered as having important information regarding the communist resistance, the reeducation action was not supported by the administration from the start and the prison structure (three interconnected detention dormitories) did not allow for the prisoners to be isolated in small groups.

=== Gherla ===
At the time when the first reeducated prisoners from Pitești were transferred in 1950 to Gherla Prison, the penitentiary held approximately 1,500 people. Following the detention allocation regulations, workers and peasants were imprisoned here, and two work sections were created: a metallurgical one and a woodwork factory, each with several workshops. After the reeducation initial success at Pitești, the regime intended to spread the practice to other prisons as well, and due to ideological reasons – as workers and peasant were the forefront of the communist propaganda – Gherla was amongst the first detention places to implement it. The warden was – starting with 1949 – Tiberiu Lazăr, born in Budapest of Jewish origins, whose parents, first wife, and one child had been murdered at Auschwitz. Appointed since spring 1949, Dezideriu Iacob was the political officer. While Lazăr was in charge, beatings were common practice. For example, on the second day of Easter 1950, he set up a general beating of over 100 detainees, in the prison yard.

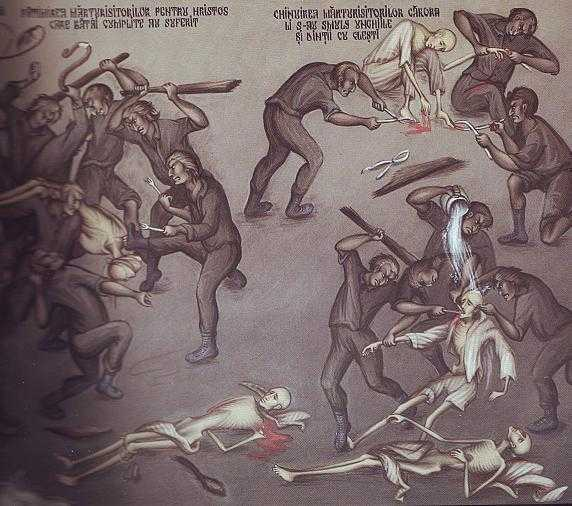
Detail from Icon of the new Romanian martyr, Diaconești monastery, showing tortures at Gherla

The inmates present on the list were gathered and escorted in the prison yard, where Mr. Lazăr Tiberiu arranged them in a circle, and ordered them to speed up the pace, placing himself in the middle. Then he ordered that guard Fulop Martin bring him two clubs, used for carrying the food pails, and started beating the inmates: over their backs, feet, head, and so on. Those who felt were further battered and forced to get up and keep running. When Mr. Lazăr Tiberiu dropped the club, Mr. Fulop Martin would present him with the other one, as it was prepared for this.

— Alexandru Popa – Interrogation Protocol, 25/08/1953, in Memorial to Horror, pp.210–211

The most important informants used by the administration – prisoners who would play a key role in the reeducation process at Gherla, but who did not undergo the full Pitești ordeal – were Alexandru Matei, Octavian Grama, Constantin P. Ionescu, and Cristian Paul Șerbănescu. The first Pitești group – counting 70–80 reeducated detainees – arrived on 7 June 1950. This group contained some of the prisoners that were active at Pitești and were as such recommended for the Gherla proceedings: Alexandru Popa, Vasile Pușcașu, Constantin Bogoș, Vasile Andronache, and Mihai Livinschi. They would form the core of the Gherla reeducation activity.

Before triggering the events, several changes were made following Securitate directives: Iacob was replaced by Gheorghe Sucigan as head of the prison Operational Bureau (OB), and Constantin Pruteanu was appointed as his deputy. Later, Pruteanu was replaced by Constantin Avădani, and warden Lazăr was replaced by captain Constantin Gheorghiu. Although brutal in his relations with the prisoners, Lazăr was a straightforward opponent of violent reeducation, and asked Tudor Sepeanu a written directive regarding this initiative, which led to his dismissal. Meanwhile, with the help of the prisoners transferred from Pitești and the local informant group, the OB build up a strong informant network, controlling all the prison key positions, from workshop leaders to the penitentiary hospital. End of September 1950, Sucigan came back from Bucharest carrying the order to start the unmasking process. This was already tested in solitary room 96, its victims being Ion Bolocan and Virgil Finghiș. The proceedings were identical to the Pitești ones: the leader of the informant network selected and grouped the targeted prisoners, and at the same time defined the informants that would infiltrate these groups. The guards made the repartitions based on direct indications from the OB. Following this, a pro-legionnaire environment was maintained in order to strengthen the relations between prisoners. Then came the shock: members of the Iron Guard were asked to unmask themselves. Those who opposed were beaten and tortured until they gave in. Doctor Viorel Bărbos and assistant Vasile Mocodeanu – helped by other inmates from the medical team – were the only ones with access to the victims, for treating the wounds. Moving them to the prison hospital was done only if approved by the OB. The denouncements were written down in front of leaders of the reeducation committee, on pieces of soap or paper bags, then adjusted by the BO officers and only afterwards sent to Bucharest. Denouncements that were not confirmed on the field were sent back to prison for verification.

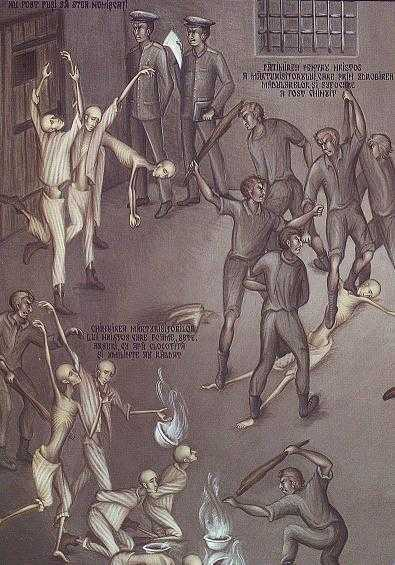
Detail from Icon of the new Romanian martyr, Diaconești monastery, showing tortures at Gherla

Tortures varied: detainees were forced to stay in uncomfortable positions ("meditation position") for long periods of time, sometimes for days on end, sitting up with hands extended, forced to eat hot food without a spoon; they had to drink salty water or made to eat feces or vomit and drink urine. During summer, some were kept with goggles over their eyes, wearing thick clothes and carrying heavy luggage, without water. Some tortures were only meant to humiliate, like having to blow into the light bulb to put it out; some were painted over their faces and made to dance for mockery.

Chirică Gabor described his ordeal:

"after the previous beating, one day we were taken in the middle of the cell with two more inmates, both painted with toothpaste over their faces. They made us kiss each others ass, then I had to finger myself and lick it. Then, for two weeks I had to do long and exhausting physical exercises – every morning and evening – such as lunges, squats and rolling over on the concrete floor. Sometimes I had to lay down on the wet floor, wearing only a shirt, and staring at the light bulb. We had to do everything in these positions, even eating. Those who dared to move were beaten up. One day they took me to the closet and made me clean it up with my bare hands; afterwards I had to eat my bread without being allowed to wash myself. Meanwhile they weaved a cord out of the strings removed from my sandals and threatened to hand me with it by the radiator. Then I went back to staying in painful postures, then beat up again. Beating usually lasted as long as the body could take it; until I passed out or started to bleed.

— Chirică Gabor – Interrogation Protocol(I), 11/04/1952, in Memorial to Horror.

Before beatings, the prisoners were checked by the medical team, to avoid deaths for those that suffered from heart related diseases. Where deaths occurred, the doctor forged the diagnostics on the death certificate, usually indicating diseases of which the detainee previously suffered. Suicide attempts occurred as well: some cut their veins with sharpened spoons, Ion Pangrate tried to slice his throat with glass from the cell window, even desperate attempts such as jumping head down on the cell floor or into the hot soup cauldron. In the Gherla penitentiary, violent reeducation was held at the third floor, room 99 being the main denouncement center (the equivalent of room 4 hospital from Pitești) while reeducation comities existed in several other prison cells.

A group of approximately 180 prisoners – led by Eugen Țurcanu – arrived at Gherla on 30 August 1950 and were incarcerated in cells 103–106. They will soon join the prison's informant network and reeducation apparatus. However, since meanwhile the Pitești reeducation secret had been revealed and several other problems occurred – such as deaths during the process itself – led to Avădani ordering a cessation of the action. In reality, they were not stopped, but only tempered. In response to this, Țurcanu conceived a Diversion and reeducation plan for Gherla prison, whose purpose was to continue the unmasking process, by non-violent means. The plan had three phases:

- As for the usual process, the first stage was to facilitate the creation of a pro-Iron Guard group and boosting its morale.
- The second stage was to provoke the unmasking of the group in a public gathering, isolate the leaders and process them. Processing meant a confrontation of the leaders with the reeducated group, with the purpose of changing their political orientation.
- The third stage consisted in the indoctrination of the prisoners with Marxist doctrine via lecturing and conferences.

The plan was stopped in December 1951, at the beginning of the third stage. Gherla reeducation continued until February 1952, when the last isolation rooms were dissolved. Between 500 and 1000 persons went through the process, approximately 20 died as a result of torture.

=== Danube–Black Sea Canal ===
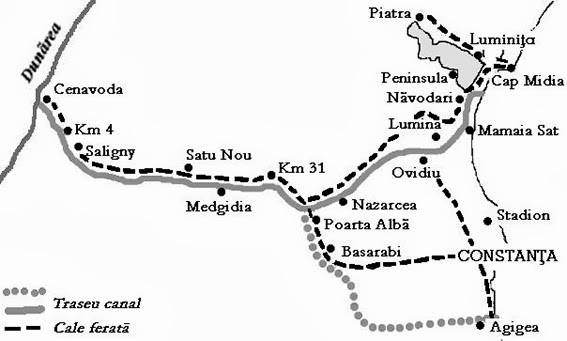
Location of the forced labor camps on the Danube–Black Sea Canal site

Work on the Danube–Black Sea Canal started in summer 1949, following the route marked by the Black Valley, stretching across Northern Dobruja from east toward west. The idea originated from a letter addressed by Stalin to Gheorghe Gheorghiu-Dej in 1948, and its purpose was far more than just for economic reasons. First of all, it was meant to be a social engineering project, with the declared aim of creating new technical and political staff. The communist regime in Bucharest could not finance such a massive undertaking; it was a politically driven project, meant to build up the "New Man", defined by the Marxist–Leninist doctrine.

This is a laboratory meant to provide – during the four-five years planned project – qualified personnel, disciplined, with elevated consciousness level, politically trained, experienced designers and site managers."

— Training done by Gheorghe Gheorghiu-Dej for the party brigade before leaving for the Canal building site.(22.03.1950)

On the other hand, this was meant to be the final destination for the old political and social elite. The political prisoners were forced to work under extremely harsh conditions, subjected to an extermination regime and targeted for the next stages of the reeducation process. While the emphasis was set more on work-driven reeducation rather than violence, the two functioned in parallel, and a great number of prisoners ended up in mass graves.

Twelve labor camps were set up alongside the canal route: Cernavodă (Columbia), Kilometer 4 (in Saligny), Kilometer 23, Kilometer 31 – Castelu (Castle), Poarta Albă (White Gate), Galeș (near Poarta Albă), 9 Culme (9 Ridge), Peninsula (near Valea Neagră), Năvodari, Midia, Constanța Stadion, and Eforie Nord. Poarta Albă labor camp was the prisoner distribution center, as it was located halfway between the Danube and the Black Sea. As a general rule, those with sentences shorter than five years were kept there, while those with sentences above this threshold were sent to the Peninsula labor camp. According to the remaining documentation from the Constanța Regional Prosecutor's Fund, between 1949 and 1955 (the period when the vast majority of labor force was constituted of political prisoners), their number oscillated as following:

- 1949: 6,400 (1 September), 7,721 (1 October), and 6,422 (30 October).
- 1950: 5,382 (30 June), 5,772 (30 July), 6,400 (30 August), and 7,721 (30 September).
- 1951: 15,000 (6 June) and 15,609 (1 September).
- 1952: 11,552 (February), 14,809 (March), 14,919 (April), 17,150 (May), 17,837 (July), 22,442 (August), and 20,768 (September).
- 1953: 20,193 (April), 17,014 (June) and 14,244 (July).

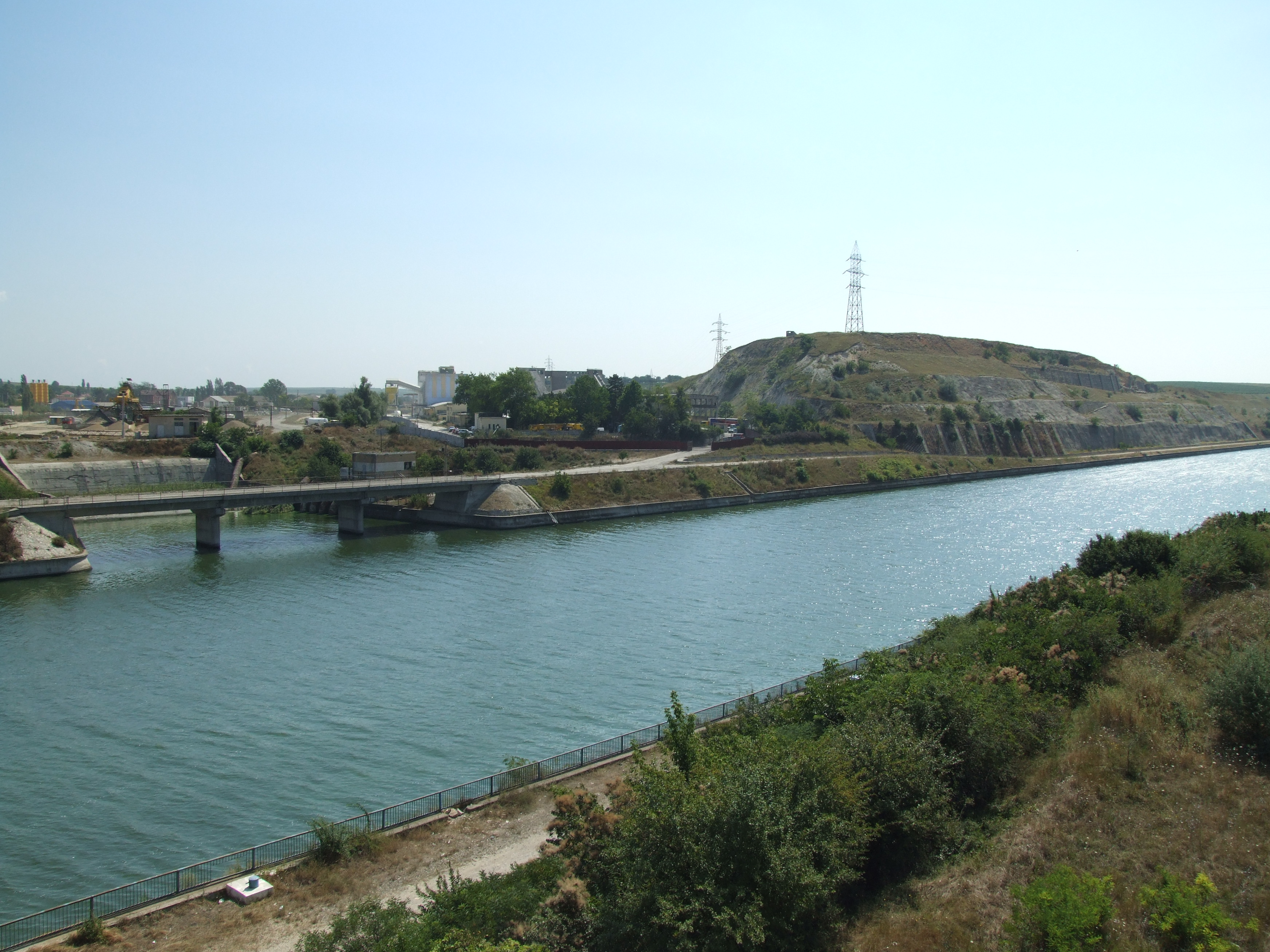
Danube-Black Sea Canal at Murfatlar

Peninsula labor camp was set up in June 1950, 12 kilometres (7.5 mi) away from Poarta Albă, on the shore of Lake Siutghiol, opposite to Mamaia town. It consisted of several H-shaped, template shacks, made up of wooden frame and battens plastered with clay, then covered with tar paper; the shack extremities were reserved as brigade bedrooms, while the transverse, close to the entrance, was used as lavatory. People slept on fir bunk beds, covered with mattresses filled with straws. The camp could accommodate a maximum number of 5,000 detainees. During its existence, several wardens succeeded in command: lieutenant Ion Ghinea, the first warden, followed by Dobrescu – November 1950, Ilie Zamfirescu – March 1951, Ștefan Georgescu – May 1951, Mihăilescu – November 1951, Tiberiu Lazăr, the former warden of Gherla prison – February/March 1952, Petre Burghișan – November 1952 and Eugen Cornățeanu – July 1953. The detention regime was very harsh. Generally, wake-up was at 5:00, while the program started around 6:00 or 7:00, depending on the distance from the labor camp to the work site. Lunch break lasted half an hour and work continued earliest till 15:30. The quantity and quality of the food varied. In the morning, a soup of roast barley ("the coffee") was served, alongside 250 grams of stiff, old, black bread. In the afternoon and evening, a tin of mashed barley or pickles soup accompanied the quarter bread. The food had such a low caloric content, that the prisoners had to supplement it in any possible way, even by eating captured snakes.

Peninsula consisted of six labor sites:

- The regular work site – Peninsula – in the proximity of the camp.
- Mamaia, where the main task was loading/unloading mine carts with excavated gravel.

Mine carts were loaded in a fast winded and dusted madness – tools were persistently growling as it was hell –, they were patchily loaded, hastily driven to the pits then fastly emptied over, only to be quickly returned to the loading point and hastily loaded again and fastly driven again and again and again, uninterrupted for twelve hours, minus lunchtime. This wagon back and forth fast-paced spectacle seamed to take place in a eerie underworld, where walking dead, in colorful dressing, were driving – driven themselves by unseen demons – ghostly mine carts.

— Teohar Mihadaș – Pe muntele Ebal, pp. 164–165

- Mustață ("mustache") work site, where gravel and rocks from other work sites were brought for filling up a valley, targeted for agriculture.
- Canara work site, where rock was excavated, broken down, crushed and loaded.
- Ring-Creastă, where soil was excavated.
- Năvodari work site, where the sea shore sand was loaded into trucks.

In parallel, work was undergone to level the terrain where the rail road and roadway would flank the Canal. The work quota for one prisoner was usually 3 m^{3} (110 cu ft) per day. This had to be excavated, loaded into the wagons, transported, rolled over and leveled. The detainees transferred from Pitești in May 1950 had to load 150 kg (330 lb) able wagons and transport the dirt for over 100 m (330 ft). Their quota was 3.5 m^{3} (120 cu ft) per day – 40 wagons were necessary to fulfill it – this being 3–4 times greater that the quota meant for free workers at the canal.

Those who were not able to fulfill the quota were persecuted, starting with the reduction of food quantity, assignment to additional labor after program, denial of family contact of any kind, and even solitary. At the end of July 1950 disciplinary brigades were established (brigades 13 and 14), initially composed of former Pitești prisoners, headed by Iosif Steier and Coloman Fuchs. Violent reeducation was initiated there. Prisoners transferred form Pitești and Gherla, who were not considered fully reeducated, or canal workers who were actively opposing the camp regime, were transferred to these brigades, where they were tortured until they unmasked themselves. One of the most violent manifestation occurred on the night of 21 June 1951 (later referred to – by prisoners – as St. Bartholomew's Night) when 14–15 inmates were brutally beaten up in brigade 14's shed by reeducated brigadiers such as Maximilian Sobolevschi, Constantin Sofronie, Pompiliu Lie, Ion Lupașcu, Simion Enăchescu, Ion Bogdănescu, and others.

The abuse started with Tudor Anghel, a mechanic from Bucharest, "tall, dark-haired, rather skinny and, since he was missing some teeth, with a hissing voice". Bogdănescu grabbed his hair with the left hand while with the right one started to hit him with a rubber club, continuously swearing. [...] The prisoners with musical instruments started playing, and on Bogdănescu's order, the newcomers were tortured as it was during a unmasking session: at first, in a desultory way, while more methodical in the later stage: two reeducated prisoners for one person. As some lost consciousness, the medical team – made up of former medicine students, led by Anton (Toni) Nisipeanu – was called. Using a bucket of water and a towel, Nisipeanu wiped the blood off their faces, and the others moved them on the bunk. "They did not do it out of sympathy for us, but rather for the torturers morale. They feared that they would soften up on the sight of blood, and not punch with sufficient vigor." Then, tortures were resumed.

— Vasile Gurău – After Bars. pag. 329

Medication smuggling was practiced in the labor camp. Drugs were confiscated from the inmates packages and then sold back to the desperate ones on the black market. The pillory was also addressed to people who tried to escape and sometimes to those who refused to work. There were recorded cases where guards framed escape scenarios and fatally shot prisoners. Such an achievement was rewarded by a 15-day leave.

One of the events that had a major influence on both the Canal detention conditions and reeducation process itself was the death of doctor Ion Simionescu on 12 July 1951. The 67-year-old prisoner was repeatedly tortured by the reeducation team, beaten up, starved as assigneded to the most exhausting tasks until – under the claim that he had to go to the toilet – he headed towards the camp fence, where he was shot by the security guards. Following this, prisoners Cicerone Ionițoiu and Constantin Ionașcu wrote and managed to sneak out of the camp and the country a series of papers that originally reached Radio Ankara, via Constanța. Forced labor on the canal site was ceased on 18 July 1953. Most of the Peninsula labor force were transferred to Aiud and Gherla prisons. The remaining prisoners had to dismantle the railroad lines and shacks and also hand over to civilian teams the unfinished buildings. Due to the inhumane work and detention regime, the death toll was high. In the summer of 1951, behind the camp medical facility, 4–5 bodies were lined up on a daily basis, while the same death rate was registered in the 1952–1953 winter. Investigations conducted by the Association of Former Political Prisoners of Romania (AFDPR) Constanța, based on death records from the villages found along the Canal route, indicate 6,355 "Canal workers" (a euphemism for detainees) died during the 1949–1953 period.

== Trials ==
=== Eugen Țurcanu trial ===
In order to cover up the responsibility for the events, the Securitate wanted to frame the prisoners themselves. As a result, the number of people aware of the ongoing situation was limited. Except its founders: Gheorghe Pintilie and Alexandru Nicolschi, leaders of the OS: Iosif Nemeș and Tudor Sepeanu and the prison political officers, very few people from the administration – even those who were aware of the fact that beatings are used during inquiry – were aware of the methods used for extracting information.

Prisoner Vintilă Weiss was incarcerated at Gherla in May 1951. Arrested for presumed frontier crossing felony, he was in fact victim of a personal scuffle with Marin Jianu, the Interior Minister deputy, about whom he had compromising information. Under torture, Weiss made a series of compromising reports on high-ranking people from the Party, such as Teohari Georgescu, Petru Groza, Alexandru Nicolschi, Tudor Sepeanu, Gheorghe Gheorghiu-Dej, and others. This caused unrest in the Securitate and would eventually lead to the secrecy disavowal surrounding the proceedings. Together with other events such as the fact that, after two years of reeducation, there was not much relevant data to report, the considerable number of deaths and the increasing number of fabrications (made under torture) that consumed the Securitate resources, it led to the termination of the program.

Within this trial, a number of 22 detainees are indicted: Eugen Țurcanu, Vasile Pușcașu, Alexandru Popa, Maximilian Sobolevski, Mihai Livinschi, Ion Stoian, Cristian Șerbănescu, Constantin P. Ionescu, Octavian Voinea, Aristotel Popescu, Pafnutie Pătrășcanu, Dan Dumitrescu, Vasile Păvlăvoaie, Octavian Zbranca, Constantin Juberian, Cornel Popovici, Ion Voin, Ioan Cerbu, Gheorghe Popescu, Grigore Romanescu, Cornel Pop, and Constantin Juberian. The inquiry was done in parallel at both Ploiești and Râmnicu Sărat, and the investigators sought to present the Pitești and Gherla actions as planned by the Iron Guard leader, Horia Sima (at the time in exile in Austria), in order to compromise the Communist Party. The investigator wrote down the Interrogation Protocol, while the prisoner was subjected to physical and mental pressure until he signed them. On 10 November 1954 all the defendants were sentenced to death by the Military Court for Internal Affair Units. With the exception of A. Popa, O. Voinea, A. Popescu, D. Dumitrescu, and P. Pătrășcanu (whose punishments were later commuted), all others were shot at Jilava on 17 December 1954.

== Additional sources ==
- Andreica, Gheorghe (2000). Târgșorul Nou. Închisoarea minorilor [Târgșorul Nou. Prison for children] (in Romanian). Ploiești: Printeuro. ISBN 9739980910. OCLC 895035906.
- Andreica, Gheorghe (2000). Mărturii... mărturii...: din iadul temnițelor comuniste [Confessions... confessions...: from the inferno of communist dungeons] (in Romanian). București: Editura 2000. OCLC 895035546.
- Constantinescu, Alexandru Badea (2006). Labirintul terorii [Labyrinth of terror] (in Romanian). Craiova: Sim Art. ISBN 9738797640. OCLC 220305388.
- Bâgu, Gheorghe (1993). Mărturisiri din Întuneric [Confessions from darkness] (in Romanian). București: Editura Tehnică. ISBN 9733105228. OCLC 605920394.
- Dimitrie Bejan – Vifornița cea mare (The great storm), București, Editura Tehnică, 1996. (in Romanian)
- Vasile Blănaru-Flamură – Mercenarii infernului. Blestemul dosarelor. Incredibile întâmplări din Gulagurile românești (Mercenaries of hell. Papers of damnation. Incredible stories from the Romanian Gulag), București, Elisavaros, 1999. (in Romanian)
- Bordeianu, Dumitru (1995). Mărturisiri din mlaștina disperării. Cele văzute, trăite și suferite la Pitești și Gherla [Confessions from the swamp of despair. What I witnessed, lived and suffered at Pitești and Gherla] (in Romanian). București: Gama.
  - Bordeianu, Dumitru Gh (1995). Volume 1. Pitești. Editura Gama. ISBN 973965620X. OCLC 895666350.
  - Bordeianu, Dumitru Gh (1995). Volume 2. Gherla. ISBN 9739656218. OCLC 895651147.
- Goma, Paul (1990). Patimile după Pitești [The passion of Pitești] (in Romanian). București: Cartea Românească. ISBN 9732302615. OCLC 28027465.
- Vasile Gurău – După gratii (Behind bars), București, Albatros, 1999. (in Romanian)
- Pintilie, Iacob – Vremuri de bejenie si surghiun (Days of exodus and banishment) (in Romanian)
- Ianolide, Ioan (2006). Întoarcerea la Hristos. Document pentru o lume nouă [The return to Christ. Lessons for the new world] (in Romanian). București: Christiana. ISBN 9738125804. OCLC 895501133.
- Ierunca, Virgil (2013). Fenomenul Pitești [The Pitești phenomenon] (in Romanian). București: Humanitas. ISBN 9789735039752. OCLC 1016465999.
- Constantin Ionașcu – Ororile și farmecul detenției (The ordeal and charm of detention), București, Fundația Academia Civică, 2010. (in Romanian)
- Cicerone Ionițoiu – Memorii I. Din țara sârmelor ghimpate (Memoirs I. From the land of barbed wire), Iași, Polirom, 2009. (in Romanian)
- Sabin Ivan – Pe urmele adevărului (Chasing truth), Constanța, Ex Ponto, 1996. (in Romanian)
- Lăcătușu, Dumitru; Mureșan, Alin (2009). Casa Terorii. Documente privind penitenciarul Pitești (1947–1977) [House of Terror. Documents regarding the Pitești penitentiary (1947–1977)] (in Romanian). Iași: Polirom. ISBN 978-9734616428. OCLC 690704176.
- Dan Lucinescu – Jertfa (Sacrifice), Siaj. (in Romanian)
- George Mârzanca – Patru ani am fost... "bandit". Confesiuni (Four years I was a... "bandit". Confessions), București, Vasile Cârlova, 1997. (in Romanian)
- Teohar Mihaidaș – Pe muntele Ebal (On mount Ebal), Cluj, Clusium, 1990. (in Romanian)
- Pătrașcu, Damian Gheorghe (2007). Zile de încercare și de har. Amintiri din închisoare [Days of hardship and blessing. Memories from prison] (in Romanian) (Second ed.). Roman: Serafica. ISBN 978-9737820761. OCLC 895532666.
- Radina, Remus (1978). Testamentul din morgă [Dead house testament] (in Romanian). București: Tinerama. ISBN 9739544002. OCLC 935504665.
