= Leaotul =

- Location within Romania

Location
- Country: Romania
- Counties: Prahova County
- Villages: Târgșoru Nou, Brazii de Jos, Pietroșani

Physical characteristics
- Mouth: Teleajen
  - coordinates: 44.8306°N 26.1942°E
- Length: 47 km (29 mi)
- Basin size: 175 km^{2} (68 sq mi)

Basin features
- Progression: Teleajen→ Prahova→ Ialomița→ Danube→ Black Sea

The Leaotul is a right tributary of the river Teleajen in Romania. It flows into the Teleajen near Palanca. Its length is 47 km (29 mi) and its basin size is 175 km^{2} (68 sq mi).
