= Bright Light =

Bright Light may refer to:

- Bright Light (CIA), a CIA clandestine interrogation center in Bucharest
- "The Bright Light", a song by Tanya Donelly on the 1997 album Lovesongs for Underdogs
- Bright Light Ballads, a 2009 album of Howard Eliott Payne
- Bright light therapy, a treatment for Seasonal Affective Disorder
- Bright Light Bright Light, Welsh singer
- Brightlight Pictures, Canadian film and television production company
- Brightlight Productions, Philippine television production company
- EA Bright Light, a UK game developer founded by Electronic Arts

== See also ==
- Bright Lights (disambiguation)
- Lite-Brite, an electronic toy
