= Viișoara =

Viișoara may refer to several places:

== Romania ==
- Viișoara, Bihor, a commune in Bihor County
- Viișoara, Botoșani, a commune in Botoșani County
- Viișoara, Cluj, a commune in Cluj County
- Viișoara, Mureș, a commune in Mureș County
- Viișoara, Teleorman, a commune in Teleorman County
- Viișoara, Vaslui, a commune in Vaslui County
- Viișoara, a village in Ștefan cel Mare Commune, Bacău County
- Viișoara, a village in Târgu Trotuș Commune, Bacău County
- Viișoara, a village in Cobadin Commune, Constanța County
- Viișoara, a village in Ulmi Commune, Dâmbovița County
- Viișoara, a village in Drăgotești Commune, Dolj County
- Viișoara, a village in Alexandru cel Bun Commune, Neamț County (itself called Viișoara until 2002)
- Viișoara, a village in Ciumești Commune, Satu Mare County
- Viișoara, a village in Todirești Commune, Vaslui County
- Viișoara, a village in Frâncești Commune, Vâlcea County
- Viișoara, a village in Păunești Commune, Vrancea County
- Viișoara, a village in Vidra Commune, Vrancea County
- Viișoara, a district in the town of Ștefănești, Argeș County
- Viișoara, a district in the city of Bistrița, Bistrița-Năsăud County
- Viișoara, a district in the city of Vaslui, Vaslui County
- Viișoara (river), a tributary of the Prahova in Prahova County

== Moldova ==
- Viișoara, Edineț, a commune in Edineț district
- Viișoara, Glodeni, a commune in Glodeni district
- Viișoara, a village in Purcari Commune, Ștefan Vodă district

== See also ==
- Viile (disambiguation)
