= Ovidiu (name) =

Ovidiu is a Romanian given name derived from Latin Ovidius. The female form is Ovidia.

People named Ovidiu:

- Ovidiu Anton (born 1983), Romanian singer-songwriter
- Ovidiu Bali (born 1975), Romanian boxer
- Ovidiu Bic (born 1994), Romanian footballer
- Ovidiu Bobîrnat (born 1978), Romanian-Cypriot boxer
- Ovidiu Buidoso (born 1987), Romanian gymnast
- Ovidiu Burcă (born 1980), Romanian footballer and manager
- Ovidiu Cernăuțeanu (a.k.a. Ovidiu Jacobsen, Ovi Martin) (born 1974), Romanian-Norwegian singer
- Ovidiu Cojocaru (born 1996), Romanian rugby footballer
- Ovidiu Constantinescu (1933–2012), Romanian mycologist
- Ovidiu Cornea (born 1980), Romanian rower
- Ovidiu Cotruș (1926–1977), Romanian essayist and literary critic
- Ovidiu Covaciu (born 1990), Romanian footballer
- Ovidiu Creangă (1921–2017), Romanian activist and author
- Ovidiu Cuc (born 1973), Romanian footballer and manager
- Ovidiu Dănănae (born 1985), Romanian footballer and coach
- Ovidiu Forai (1919–1979), Romanian wrestler
- Ovidiu Ganț (born 1966), Romanian politician
- Ovidiu Cornel Hanganu (born 1970), Romanian former footballer
- Ovidiu Hațegan (born 1980), Romanian football referee
- Ovidiu Herea (born 1985), Romanian footballer and manager
- Ovidiu Hoban (born 1982), Romanian former footballer
- Ovidiu Horșia (born 2000), Romanian footballer
- Ovidiu Iacov (1981–2001), Romanian footballer
- Ovidiu Ionescu (born 1989), Romanian table tennis player
- Ovidiu Lazăr (born 1965), Romanian footballer and manager
- Ovidiu Lipan (born 1953), Romanian drummer
- Ovidiu Maier (born 1971), Romanian footballer and manager
- Ovidiu Maitec (1925–2007), Romanian sculptor
- Ovidiu Marc (born 1968), Romanian footballer and manager
- Ovidiu Melniciuc (born 1994), Romanian rugby footballer
- Ovidiu Mendizov (born 1986), Romanian footballer
- Ovidiu Marius Mihalache (born 1984, Romanian footballer
- Ovidiu Iuliu Moldovan (1942–2008), Romanian actor
- Ovidiu Morariu (born 1989), Romanian footballer
- Ovidiu Mușetescu (1955–2009), Romanian politician
- Ovidiu Olteanu (born 1970), Romanian athlete
- Ovidiu Oprea (born 1976), Romanian cyclist
- Ovidiu Papadima (1909–1996), Romanian literary critic, folklorist, and essayist
- Ovidiu Pecican (born 1959), Romanian historian and writer
- Ovidiu Perianu (born 2002), Romanian footballer
- Ovidiu Petre (born 1982), Romanian footballer and manager
- Ovidiu Popescu (born 1994), Romanian footballer
- Ovidiu Raețchi (born 1979), Romanian politician
- Ovidiu Savin (born 1977), Romanian-American mathematician
- Ovidiu Ioan Silaghi (born 1962), Romanian politician
- Ovidiu Slușariuc (born 1968), Romanian former rugby footballer
- Ovidiu Sterian (born 2004), Romanian footballer
- Ovidiu Stîngă (born 1972), Romanian footballer and manager
- Ovidiu Stoianof (born 1985), Romanian footballer
- Ovidiu Tender (born 1956), Romanian businessman and criminal
- Ovidiu Tonița (born 1980), Romanian rugby footballer
- Ovidiu Vezan (born 1985), Romanian footballer
- Ovidiu Zotta (1935–1996), Romanian children's writer, screenwriter, comics writer, and editor

Places:

- Ovidiu
- Ovidiu Island
