= Simion Stolnicu =

Romanian poet (1905–1966)

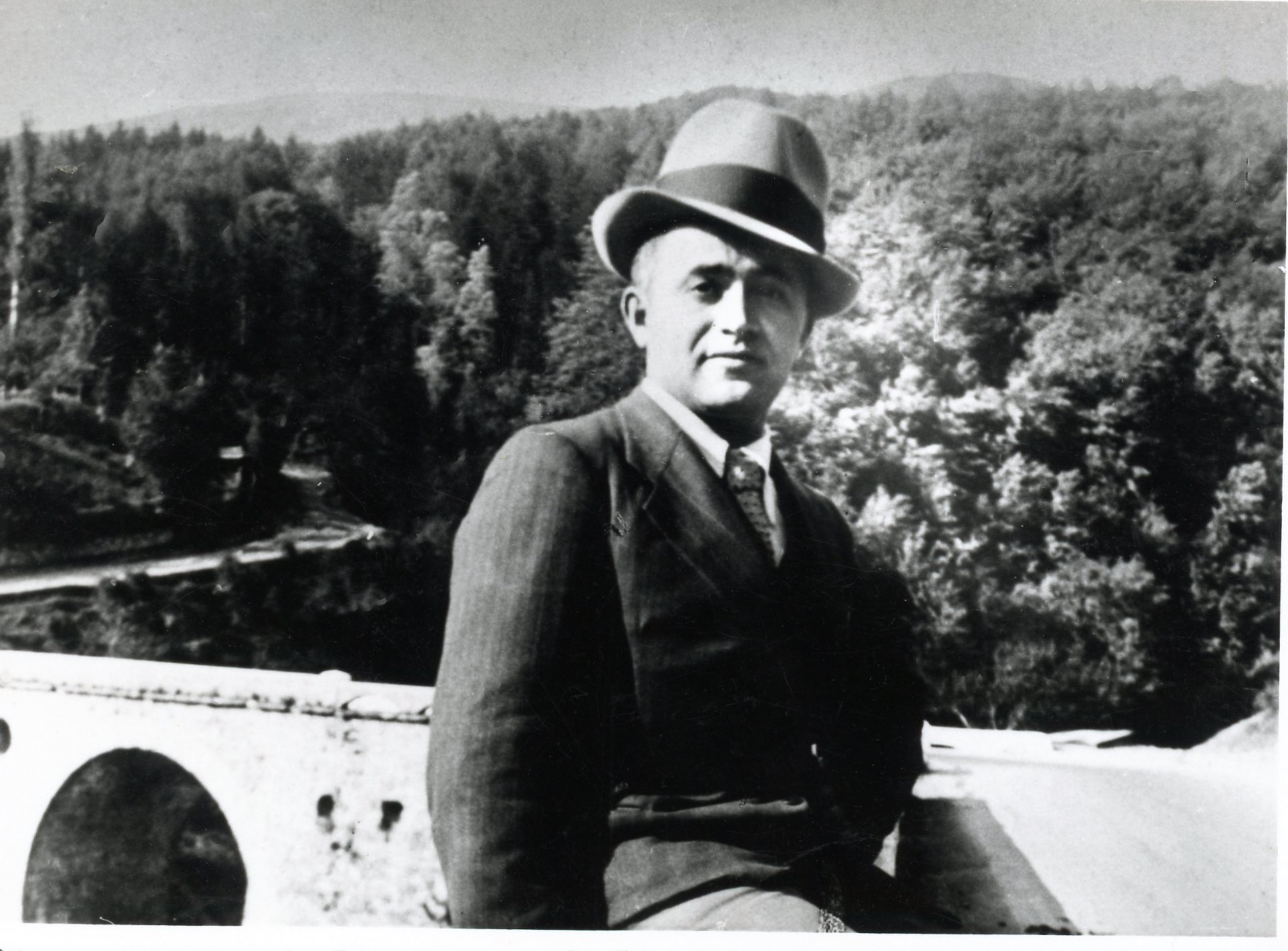
- Simion Stolnicu
- Born: Alexandru I. Botez; November 6, 1905; Puchenii-Moșneni, Prahova County, Kingdom of Romania
- Died: November 29, 1966 (aged 61); Gura Beliei, near Comarnic, Socialist Republic of Romania
- Education: University of Bucharest
- Occupations: Poet, teacher
- Writing career
- Pen name: Al. I. Alexandrescu, Al. I. Botez, Simion Stolnicu
- Language: Romanian
- Notable works: Punct vernal, Pod eleat

Simion Stolnicu (pen name of Alexandru I. Botez; November 6, 1905 – November 29, 1966) was a Romanian poet.

Born in Puchenii-Moșneni, Prahova County, his parents were Al. Botez, a Căile Ferate Române clerk, and his wife Ecaterina (née Ionescu). He attended primary school in his native village from 1914 to 1918, under the name Alexandrescu I. Alexandru. He then went to Saint Sava High School in Bucharest from 1918 to 1925, privately taking the final years of high school at Câmpina. He studied at the University of Bucharest from 1932 to 1938, graduating from the literature faculty, with a specialty in French and Italian. He taught high school in Bucharest, Ploiești, Câmpina and, from 1949, Comarnic.

He made his literary debut in 1924, with poems published in the Cluj magazine Cosânzeana under the name Al. I. Alexandrescu. In 1925, his verses appeared in Adevărul literar under the name Al. I. Botez. He first wrote as Simion Stolnicu, a name suggested by Eugen Lovinescu, in Sburătorul in 1926. He founded Rapsodul magazine in Ploiești in 1927. Other publications that ran his work include Bilete de Papagal, Kalende, Vremea, Ulise, Abecedar, Azi, Revista Fundațiilor Regale, and Universul literar. His first volume of poetry was Punct vernal, followed by Pod eleat (1935). He died in Gura Beliei, near Comarnic. The posthumous Șerpuiri între lut și torțele de aur (1973), aside from older poems, includes verses from 1935 to 1966. A second posthumous volume is Printre scriitori și artiști (1988). Poems, prose, drama, essays and memoirs remain as unpublished manuscripts.
