= Târgșor Prison =

Prison in Târgșoru Nou, Romania

- Interactive map of Târgșor Prison
- Location: Târgșoru Nou, Ariceștii Rahtivani, Romania; 44°54′56″N 25°52′28″E
- Population: 910 (as of 1989); 518 (as of 2024)
- Opened: 1882
- Managed by: Administrația Națională a Penitenciarelor
- Director: Ionica Ciocodei
- Website: Official website

Târgșor Prison is a prison complex in Târgșoru Nou, a component village of Ariceștii Rahtivani commune, Prahova County, located in central Muntenia, Romania.

== History ==
=== Early days ===
The structure was built in 1857 by the monk Rovin, who named it the Crângul Teiului Monastery. After Rovin died in 1864, the other monks abandoned the monastery, which was taken over by the Romanian Army and turned into an arsenal on orders from domnitor Alexandru Ioan Cuza. In 1882, following the registration of a very large number of refusals to perform military service, the Minister of War, Ion C. Brătianu, asked King Carol I to establish a military prison at Crângul Teiului. Two new wings were constructed, bringing the total capacity to about 800–1,000 beds (without adequate ventilation, though). At times, the prison was also used to hold common law criminals when the nearby Ploiești Penitentiary would become overcrowded.

=== Communist era ===
On May 8, 1948, after the Communist system was established in Romania, the Târgșorul Nou military prison was taken over by the Ministry of Internal Affairs and turned into a civilian prison.

From 1948 to 1952, this was the only prison for children in the world (dubbed the "Prison of Angels"). The children were subjected to the cold and to beatings; they were hungry and isolated in cramped rooms, without light, with boarded-up windows, where ventilation was done through tiny cracks around the door frames and windows. Hundreds of recalcitrant minors (some as young as 12) were subjected to psychological experiments and beaten with the intention of being "re-educated" in the spirit of the "Communist new man". The re-education of minors was personally coordinated by Securitate major-general Alexandru Nicolschi, one of the main organizers of the Pitești Experiment; other Securitate officers involved were colonels Mișu Dulgheru and Ludovic Czeller. From summer 1948 to June 1949, over 800 children, mostly students, arrived at Târgșor. One batch consisted of students from Dragoș Vodă High School in Sighetu Marmației, who were accused of demonstrating against the regime. Arrested in August 1948 and kept at Sighet Prison until May 1949, they were tried in Cluj and then detained mostly at Târgșor, but also at Pitești and Gherla prisons, or sent to perform forced labor at the Danube–Black Sea Canal.

By September 1949, some 870 former Romanian Police cadres, including old prison guards and members of the Siguranța statului (such as Constantin Maimuca, its deputy director in 1940–1941) had been rounded up and sent to Târgșor, where they maintained fervent (but unrealistic) beliefs about a coming American liberation of Romania. Another category of prisoners who were incarcerated at Târgșor were people detained by the Securitate after being accused of subversive revolutionary activities, such as Sorin Bottez and Radu Ciuceanu.

In 1950, the prisoners were transferred to other penal institutions and Romanian prisoners from the Soviet Union were brought in their place. On January 6, 1952, all male prisoners were transferred to other penal institutions and female prisoners were brought in their place. In May 1954, most detainees were either transferred to other penal institutions or released; a small number of female prisoners accused of murder remained. On July 31, 1977, the women's penitentiary in nearby Mislea was abolished, and the convicts were transferred to Târgșor Prison. On the eve of the Romanian Revolution of December 1989, there were 910 female inmates in the prison; after the amnesty of January 1990, there were still 280 unpardoned prisoners.

=== Current use ===
Nowadays, the penitenciary serves as a women's prison. The facility covers an area of 15.03 ha (37.1 acres), of which 3 ha (7.4 acres) are holding spaces. As of January 2023, there are 534 detainees at Târgșor. One notable inmate is Elena Udrea, a politician who is serving a 6-year term for corruption offenses.

== See also ==
- List of prisons in Romania
- Re-education in Communist Romania
