= Viile =

Viile may refer to several villages in Romania:

- Viile, a village in Ion Corvin Commune, Constanţa County
- Viile, a village in Fârțănești Commune, Galaţi County
- Viile, a village in Scrioaștea Commune, Teleorman County

== See also ==
- Viișoara (disambiguation)
