= Ariceștii Rahtivani =

- Commune
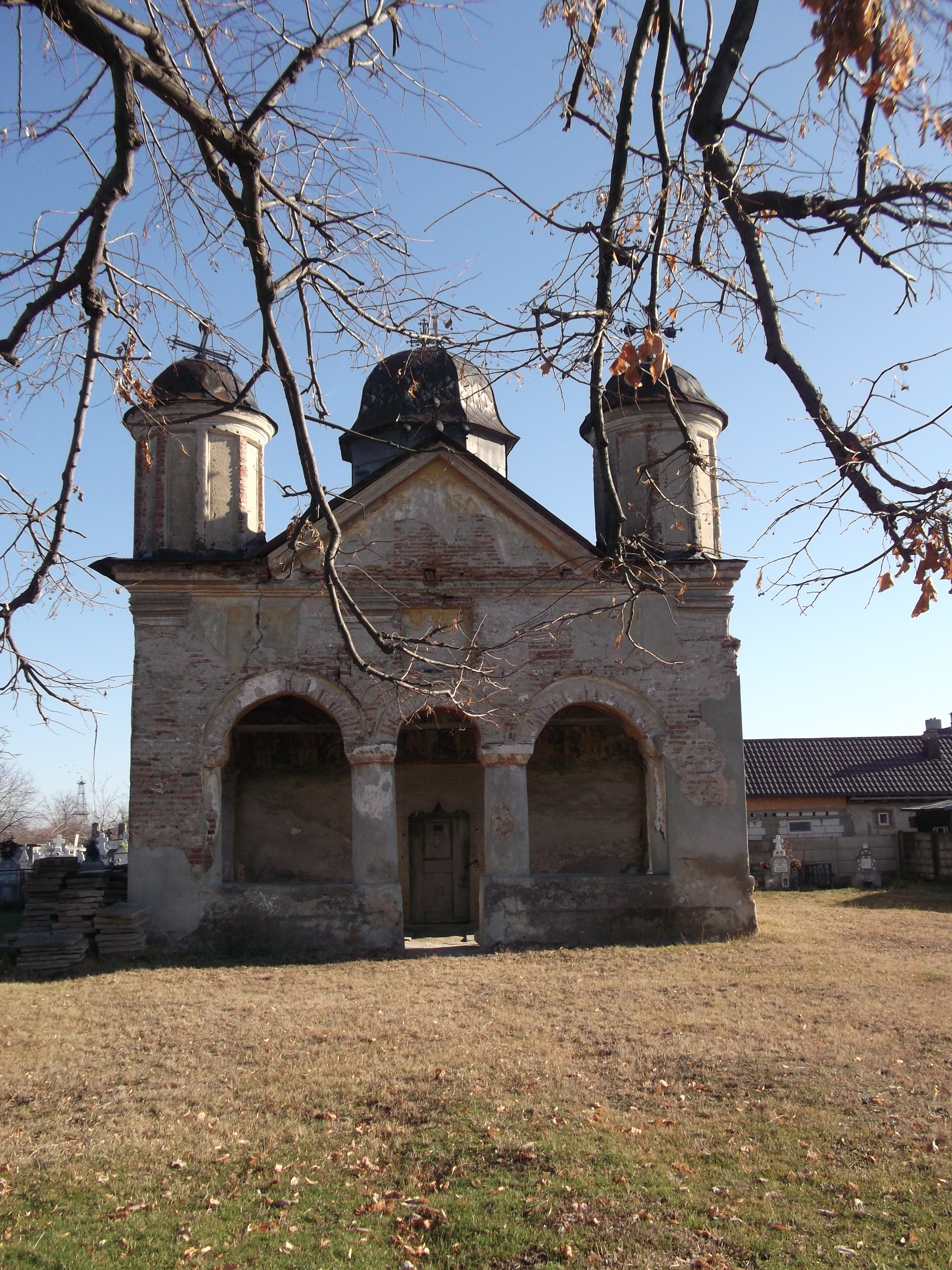
- Old church at the Ariceștii Rahtivani cemetery

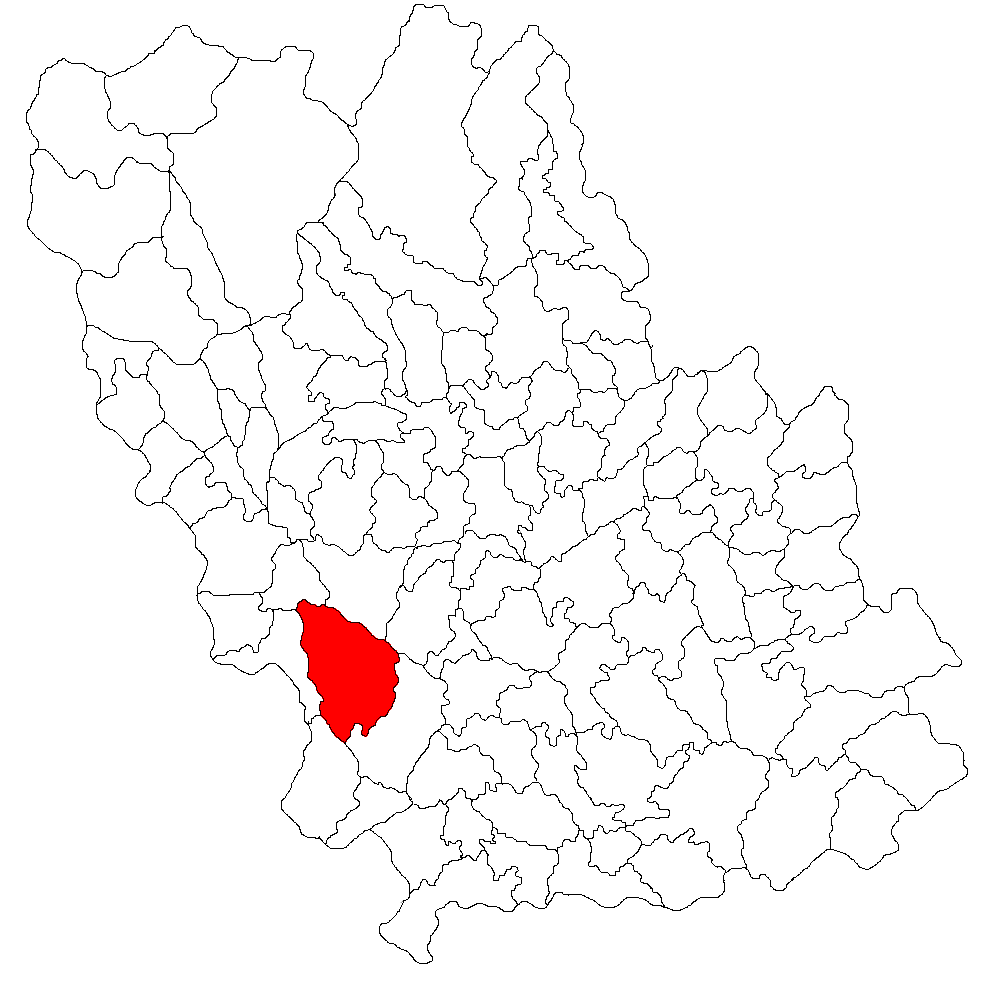
- Location in Prahova County

- Location in Romania
- Coordinates: 44°57′N 25°50′E
- Country: Romania
- County: Prahova

Government
  - Mayor (2020–2024): Gheorghe Orbu (USR)
- Area: 75.67 km^{2} (29.22 sq mi)
- Elevation: 239 m (784 ft)
- Population (2021-12-01): 8,173
  - Density: 108.0/km^{2} (279.7/sq mi)
- Time zone: UTC+02:00 (EET)
  - Summer (DST): UTC+03:00 (EEST)
- Postal code: 107025
- Area code: +(40) 244
- Vehicle reg.: PH
- Website: comunaaricestiirahtivani.ro

Ariceștii Rahtivani is a commune in Prahova County, Muntenia, Romania. It is composed of five villages: Ariceștii Rahtivani, Buda, Nedelea, Stoenești, and Târgșoru Nou.

Historical population
Year	Pop.	±%
1992	8,250	—
2002	8,914	+8.0%
2011	8,704	−2.4%
2021	8,173	−6.1%
Source: Census data

== Geography ==
The commune is situated in the Wallachian Plain, on the left bank of the Prahova River; the rivers Leaotul and Viișoara flow through Târgșoru Nou village. Ariceștii Rahtivani is located in the southwestern part of the county, 15 km (9.3 mi) west of the county seat, Ploiești.

== Transportation ==
The commune is crossed by national road DN76, which runs from Ploiești to Târgoviște and on to Găești. In Stoenești village, two county roads branch off: DJ144, which leads north to Florești, and DJ140, which leads southeast to Târgșoru Vechi (where it intersects with DN1A), Brazi, and Puchenii Mari (where it ends in DN1).

The railway station in Buda village serves the Căile Ferate Române Main Line 300, which connects Bucharest to Brașov and continues to the Hungarian border near Oradea, while the stop in Târgșoru Nou village serves the Transferoviar Călători Line 302, which runs from Ploiești Sud to Târgoviște.

== Târgșor Prison ==
The Târgșor Prison is located on the western side of Târgșoru Nou. Built in 1857 for a monastery, the structure was taken over by the Romanian Army and turned into a military prison, which was also used for common law criminals when the nearby Ploiești Penitentiary was overcrowded. From 1948 to 1952, after the Communist system was established in Romania, this was the only prison for children in the world (dubbed the "Prison of Angels"). Hundreds of recalcitrant minors (some as young as 12) were subjected to psychological experiments and beaten with the intention of being "re-educated" in the spirit of the "Communist new man" (see: Re-education in Communist Romania); the re-education of minors was personally coordinated by Alexandru Nicolschi, one of the main organizers of the Pitești Experiment. Nowadays, the penitenciary serves as a women's prison.
