= Ovidiu Island =

Island in Romania

Coordinates: 44°15′01″N 28°34′54″E

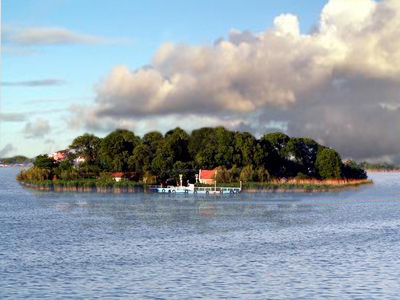
Ovidiu Island

Ovidiu Island (Romanian: Insula Ovidiu) is a small island located in Siutghiol Lake, west of the Black Sea. The island is part of Constanța County, Dobruja, Romania. It is located 500 meters (1,600 ft) off the coast, being close to the city of Ovidiu and the resort of Mamaia.

== History ==
The island is of limestone composition. Here, the poet Publius Ovidius Naso (who lived between 43 BC and 17 AD) was exiled by Emperor Augustus in 8 AD. During his exile, he wrote two works. According to the research done on the island, there are traces of human settlements from the times of the Dacians, and the oldest settlements date from the Paleolithic. Over the years, settlements of the Getae, Scythians, and Greeks have been found here.
