= Viișoara (river) =

Viișoara Puturosu
- Location within Romania

Location
- Country: Romania
- Counties: Prahova County

Physical characteristics
- Mouth: Prahova
  - location: Palanca
  - coordinates: 44.8033°N 26.1648°E
- Length: 26 km (16 mi)
- Basin size: 30 km^{2} (12 sq mi)

Basin features
- Progression: Prahova→ Ialomița→ Danube→ Black Sea

The Viișoara is a left tributary of the river Prahova in Romania. It discharges into the Prahova near Palanca. It flows through the villages Târgșoru Nou, Târgșoru Vechi, Puchenii Mici and Puchenii Mari. Its length is 26 km (16 mi) and its basin size is 30 km^{2} (12 sq mi).
