= Bright Lights, Big City =

Bright Lights, Big City may refer to:

- "Bright Lights, Big City" (song), a 1961 song by Jimmy Reed
- Bright Lights, Big City (novel), a 1984 novel by Jay McInerney
- Bright Lights, Big City (film), a 1988 film based on McInerney's novel
- Bright Lights, Big City (musical), a 1999 musical by Paul Scott Goodman, based on McInerney's novel
- "Bright Lights/Big City", a 2008 episode of Project Runway

== See also ==
- "Bright Lights Bigger City", a 2010 song by Cee Lo Green
