= Lake Siutghiol =

Lagoon in Northern Dobruja, Romania

Siutghiol
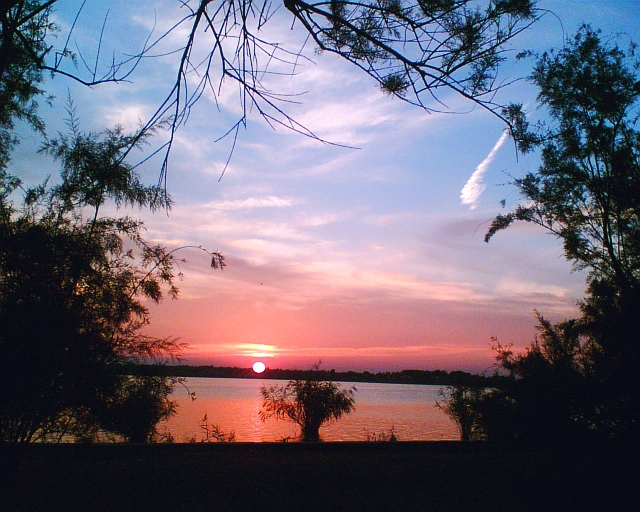
- Lake Siutghiol

- Location within Romania
- Location: Dobruja
- Coordinates: 44°14′47″N 28°36′00″E
- Basin countries: Romania
- Max. length: 7.5 km (4.7 mi)
- Max. width: 2.5 km (1.6 mi)
- Surface area: 20 km^{2} (7.7 sq mi)
- Max. depth: 18 m (59 ft)
- Islands: Ovidiu Island
- Settlements: Ovidiu, Mamaia

Siutghiol (Romanian pronunciation: [ˈsjut.ɡjol]) is a lagoon on the shores of the Black Sea, in Constanța County, Northern Dobruja, Romania. It has a length of 7.5 km (4.7 mi) and a width of 2.5 km (1.6 mi); it extends over 20 km^{2} (7.7 sq mi) and has a maximum depth of 18 m (59 ft).

Ovidiu Island is a small island on the west side of the lake, 500 m (550 yd) from the town of Ovidiu. On the east side of the lake is the resort town of Mamaia, which lies on a strip of land 8 km (5.0 mi) in length and only 300 m (330 yd) in width, between the Black Sea and Lake Siutghiol.

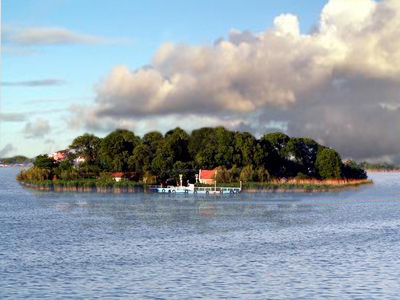
Ovidiu Island

== Etymology ==
The name of the lake comes from the Turkish Sütgöl, meaning "the milk lake".
