= Ovid, Missouri =

Extinct hamlet in Missouri, U.S.

Coordinates: 39°28′03″N 93°53′03″W

Ovid is an extinct town in northeast Ray County, in the U.S. state of Missouri.

The community was on a county road (Ovid Road) adjacent to Missouri Route E approximately thirteen miles north-northeast of Richmond. The headwaters of Mud Creek arise just to the west of the site.

A post office called Ovid was established in 1888, and remained in operation until 1904. Besides the post office, Ovid had a country store.
