= Bright Light (CIA) =

CIA black site in Bucharest

Coordinates: 44.467955°N 26.046033°E

Bright Light is the codename of one of the Central Intelligence Agency's network of black sites—clandestine interrogation centers. The location of the site, in Bucharest, Romania, was confirmed in an exclusive report from the Associated Press on December 8, 2011.

Some of the most important captives in the high value detainee program, including Khalid Sheikh Mohammed, the mastermind of the September 11 attacks, were held there. Other sites in the CIA's network were in isolated locations. The Bucharest site was housed within the campus of the Romanian National Registry Office for Classified Information, explaining the need for high security.

The cells the captive were held in were mounted on springs, to keep the captives off balance. According to ABC News captives were subjected to "enhanced interrogation techniques" in the Bucharest site, but were not subjected to the controversial technique of waterboarding.

== Authorization from the Romanian government ==
Romanian President Ion Iliescu claimed in a Der Spiegel interview that he approved just the use of the location, without knowing the details about the secret prison. The U.S. government requested at the end of 2002/beginning of 2003 a building for the CIA and Iliescu approved it, appointing presidential adviser Ioan Talpeș in charge of the details.

Talpeș said that he understood that the situation could "become dangerous", so he told the CIA that the Romanian government did not want to know anything regarding how the building was being used.

These statements contradict the result of a 2008 investigation by the Romanian Parliament, which concluded that no CIA prisons existed in Romania.
