= Mamaia =

District of Constanța

Coordinates: 44°14′47″N 28°37′22″E

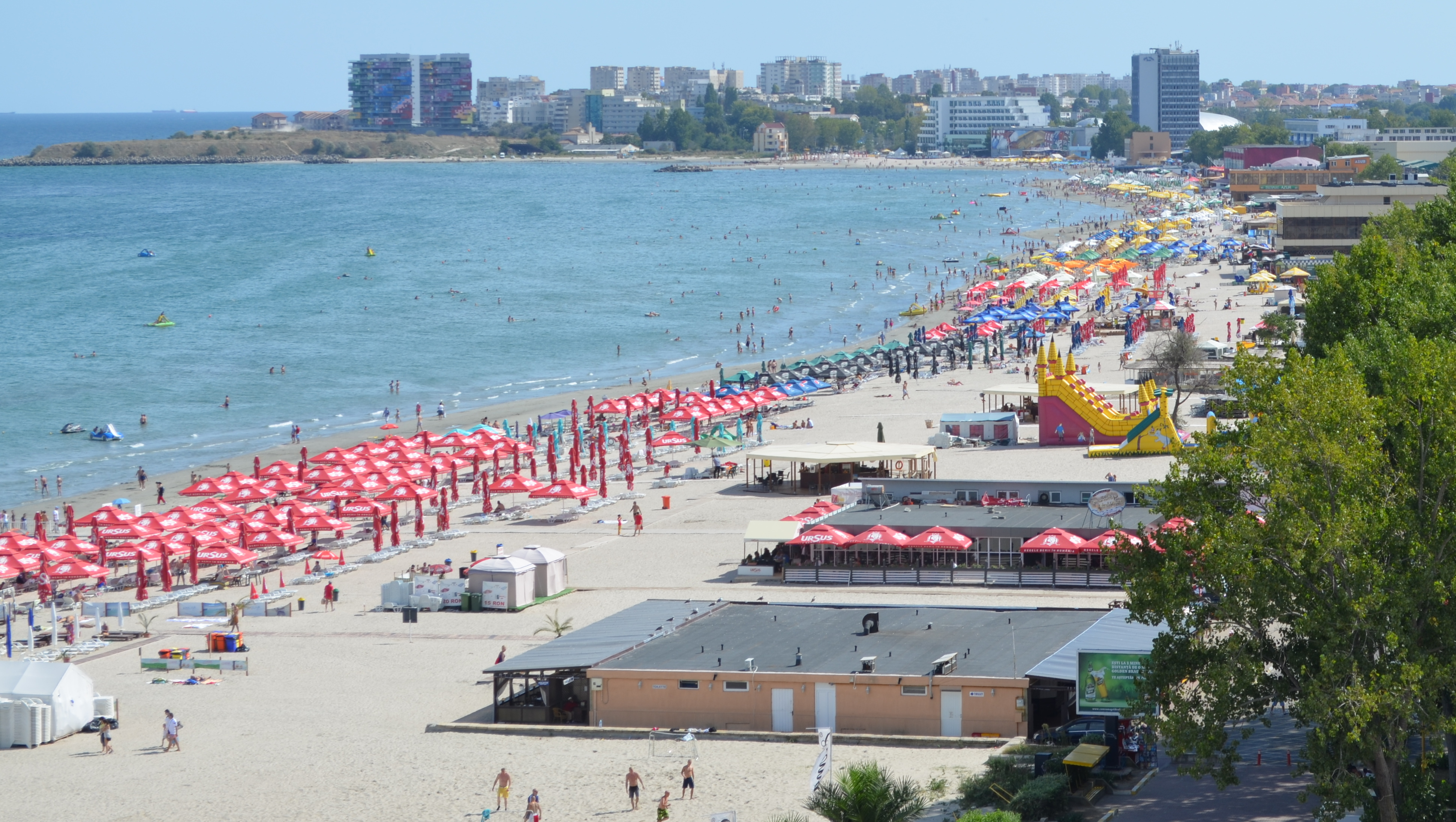
Mamaia Beach (in September 2013)

Mamaia (Romanian pronunciation: [maˈmaja]) is a resort on the Romanian Black Sea shore and a district of Constanța.

Considered to be Romania's most popular resort, Mamaia is situated immediately north-east of Constanța's city center. It has almost no full-time residents, being populated mostly during the summer.

Mamaia lies on a strip of land 8 km (5 mi) in length and only 300 m (330 yd) in width, between the Black Sea and Lake Siutghiol.

The beach season is at its best between mid-June and early September, when average daytime temperatures range between 25 and 30 °C (77 and 86 °F). The water stays warm until mid-autumn.

With an investment of approximately €3.5 million, a gondola lift system was inaugurated in 2004 connecting the entrance from Constanta to the resort and the casino area, spanning 2 km.

Hotels range from mid-end to exclusive 4- and 5-star hotels and private clubs. There are also camping sites in the north.

The 11th reunion of the Central European heads of state took place in Mamaia on 27–28 May 2004.

== Climate ==
The district of Mamaia has a humid subtropical climate (Köppen climate classification: Cfa) bordering an oceanic climate (Cfb) with slightly semi-arid influences. The winters are cool with occasional frost in the morning. The summers are warm with temperatures seldom exceeding 32°C. The rain is regular all year round.

Climate data for Mamaia (1991–2021)
Month	Jan	Feb	Mar	Apr	May	Jun	Jul	Aug	Sep	Oct	Nov	Dec	Year
Mean daily maximum °C (°F)	4.4 (39.9)	6.3 (43.3)	10.3 (50.5)	14.9 (58.8)	20.7 (69.3)	25.4 (77.7)	28.0 (82.4)	28.1 (82.6)	23.0 (73.4)	16.9 (62.4)	11.8 (53.2)	6.5 (43.7)	16.4 (61.4)
Daily mean °C (°F)	1.6 (34.9)	3.1 (37.6)	6.6 (43.9)	11.1 (52.0)	17.0 (62.6)	21.7 (71.1)	24.2 (75.6)	24.2 (75.6)	19.4 (66.9)	16.0 (60.8)	10.8 (51.4)	6.4 (43.5)	1.2 (34.2)
Mean daily minimum °C (°F)	−1.1 (30.0)	0.0 (32.0)	3.0 (37.4)	7.3 (45.1)	12.9 (55.2)	17.8 (64.0)	20.2 (68.4)	20.3 (68.5)	16.0 (60.8)	10.8 (51.4)	6.4 (43.5)	1.2 (34.2)	9.6 (49.2)
Average precipitation mm (inches)	49 (1.9)	37 (1.5)	44 (1.7)	37 (1.5)	39 (1.5)	41 (1.6)	32 (1.3)	34 (1.3)	55 (2.2)	53 (2.1)	50 (2.0)	51 (2.0)	522 (20.6)
Average precipitation days (≥ 1.0 mm)	6	5	6	5	5	5	4	4	5	6	6	7	64
Source: climate-data.org,

== Gallery ==
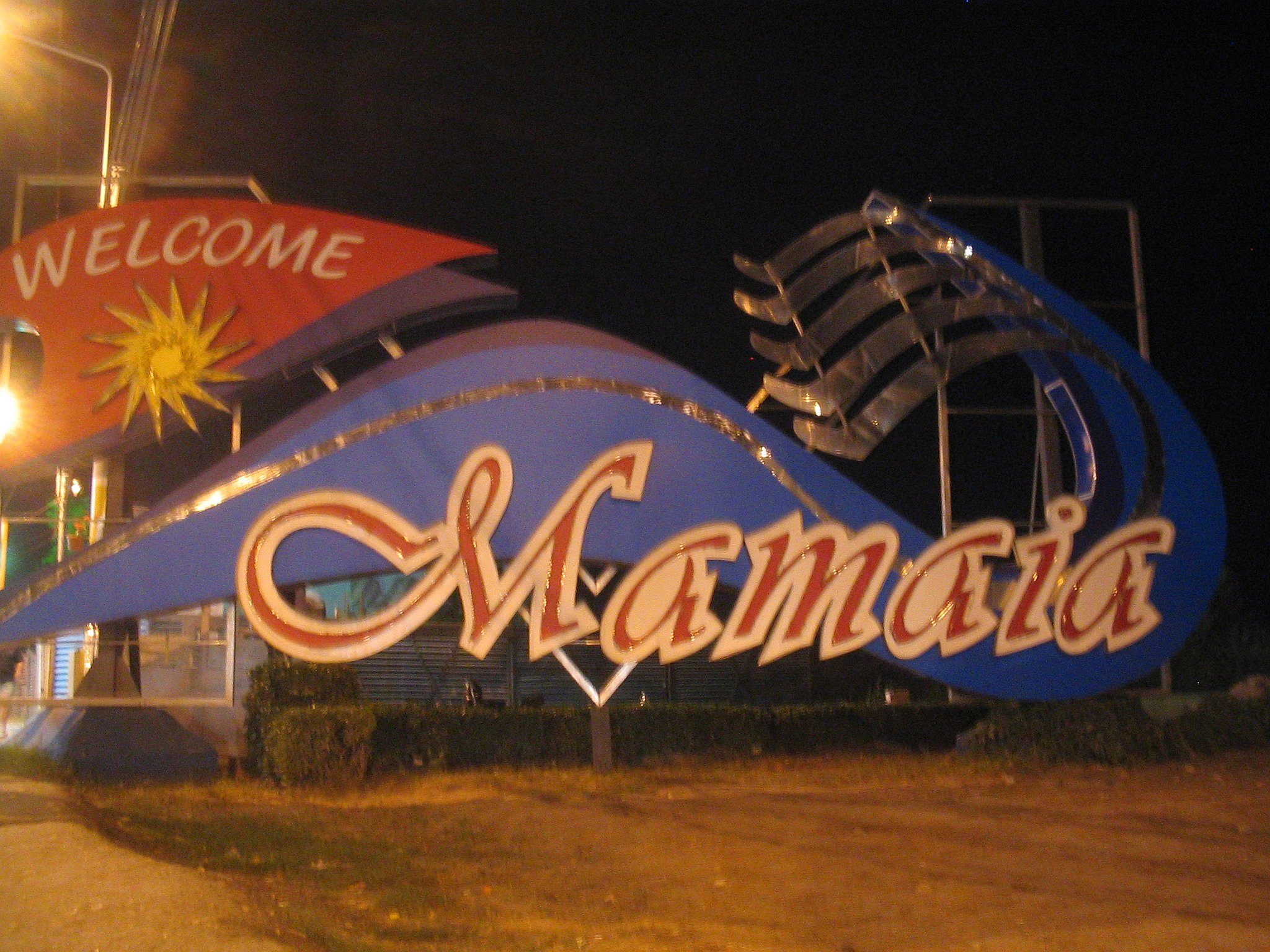
Mamaia's welcome sign

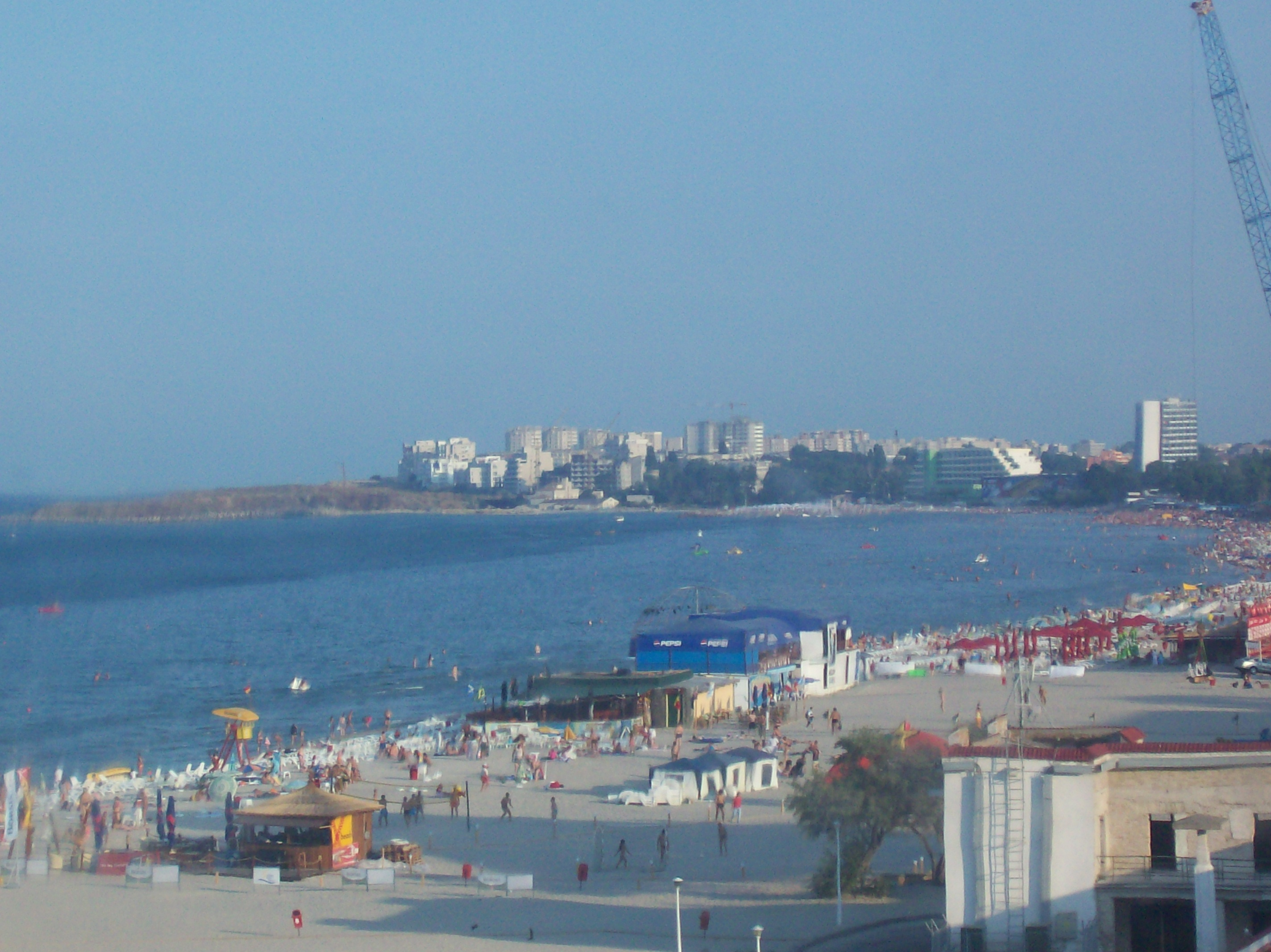
Beach (1)

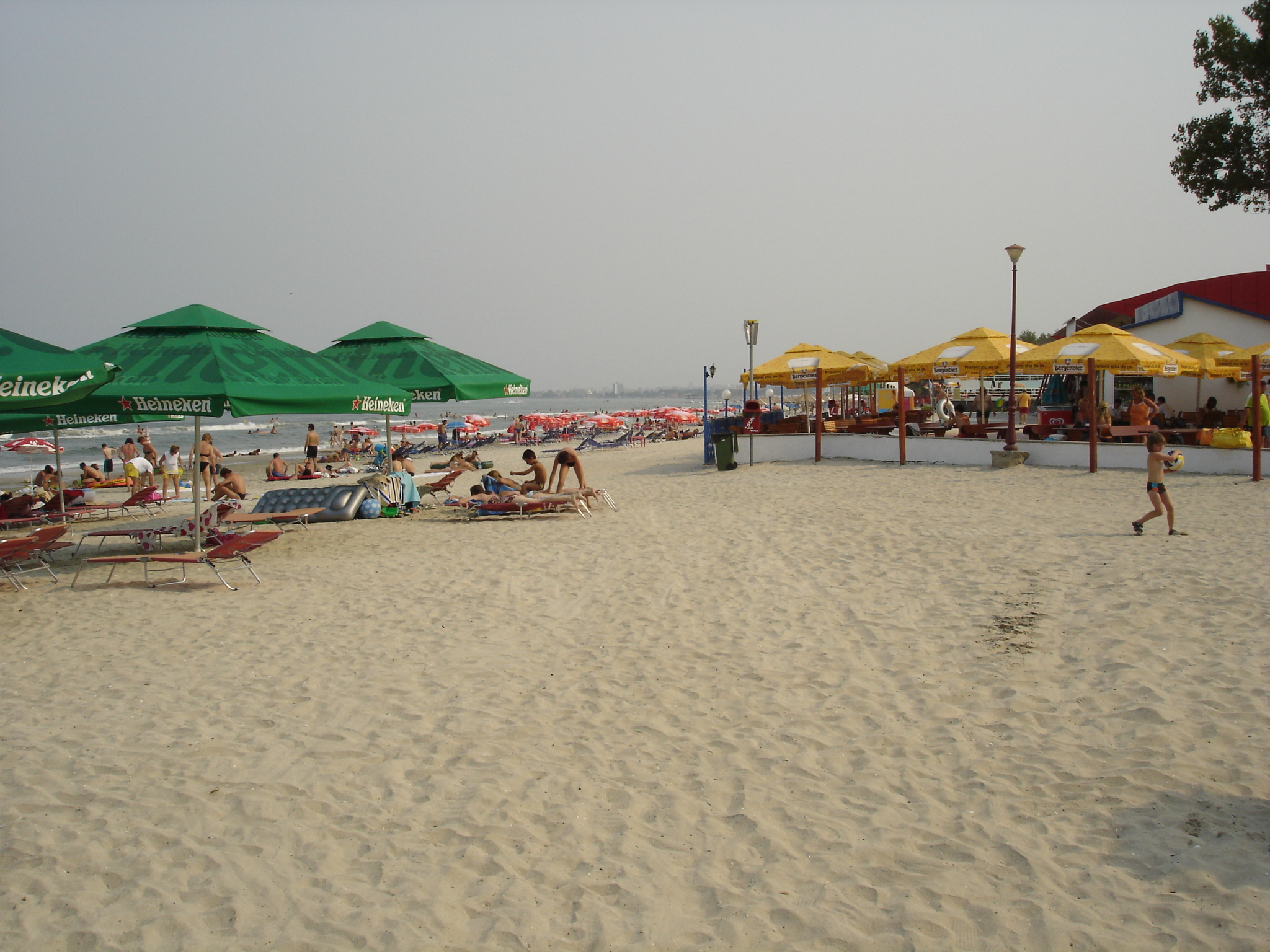
Beach (2)

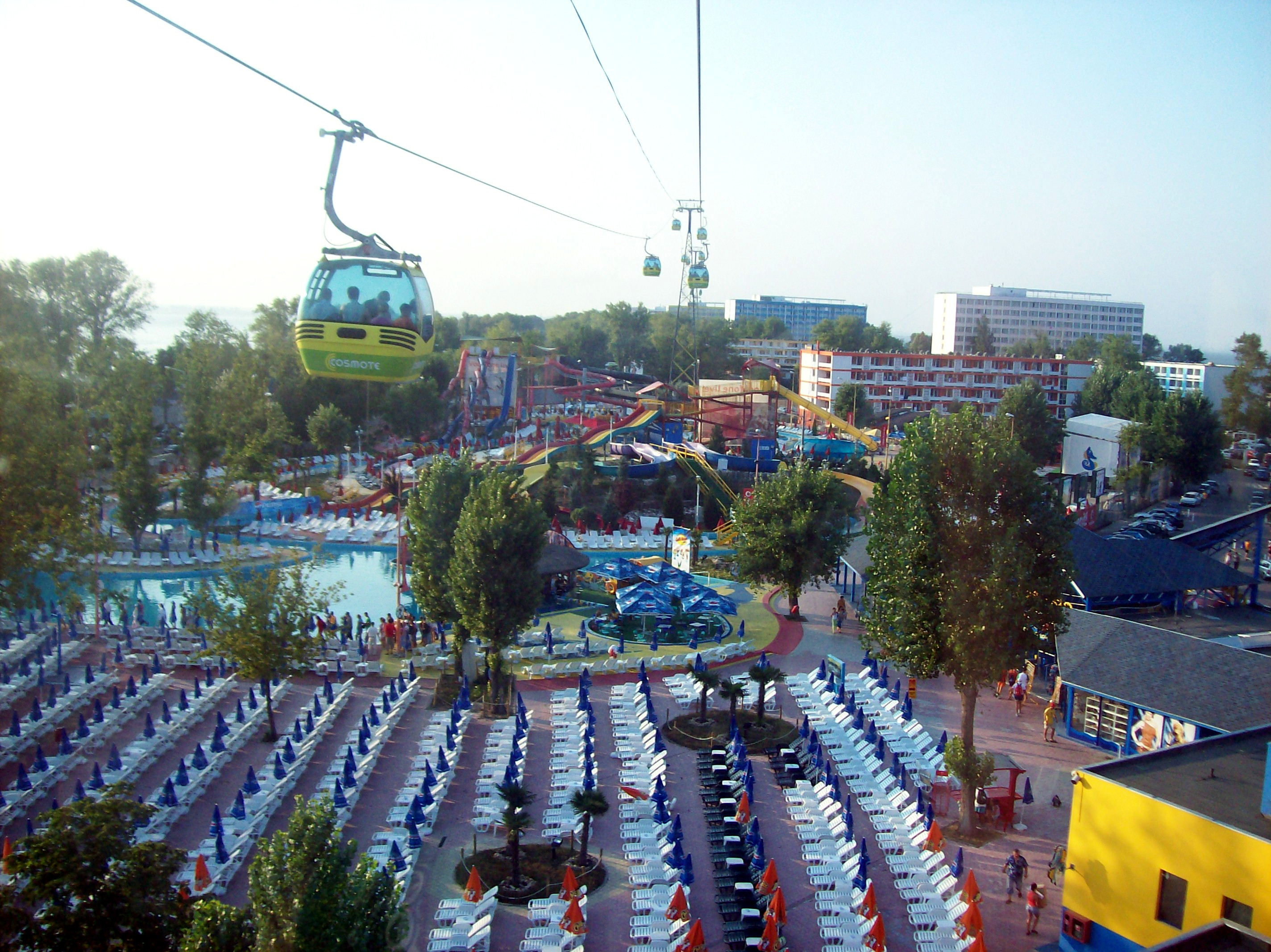
Aqua Magic

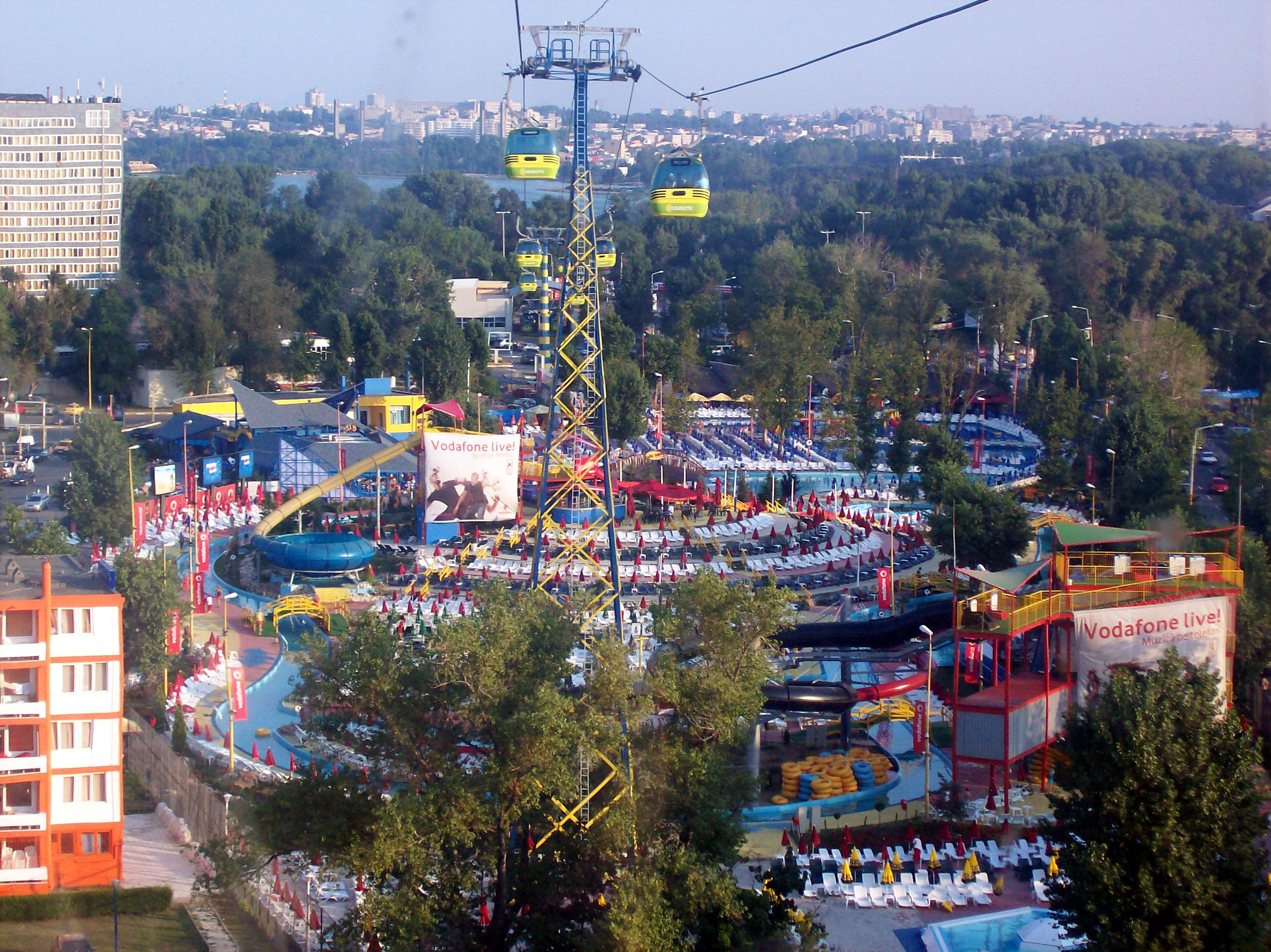
Gondola

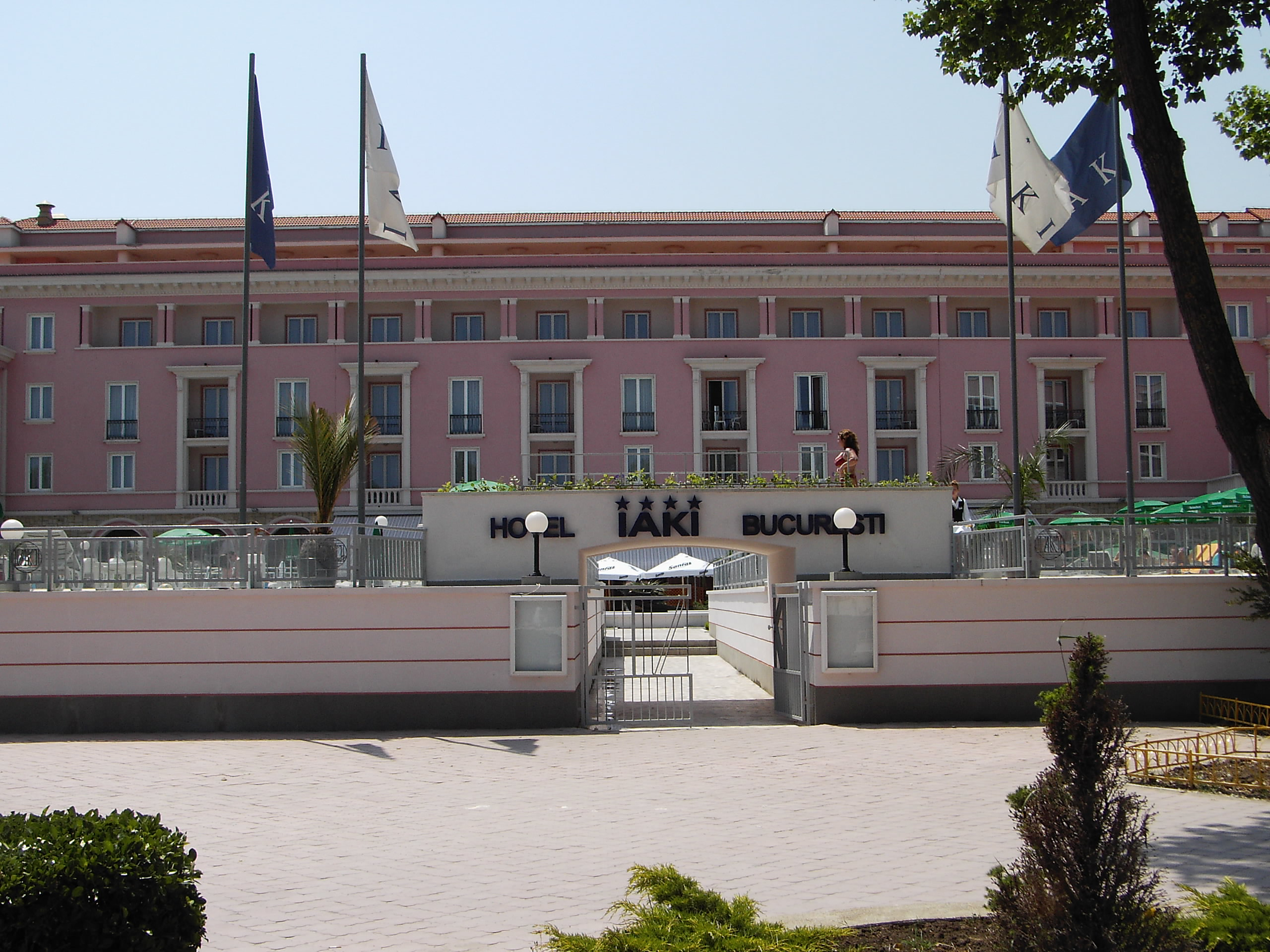
Hotel Iaki

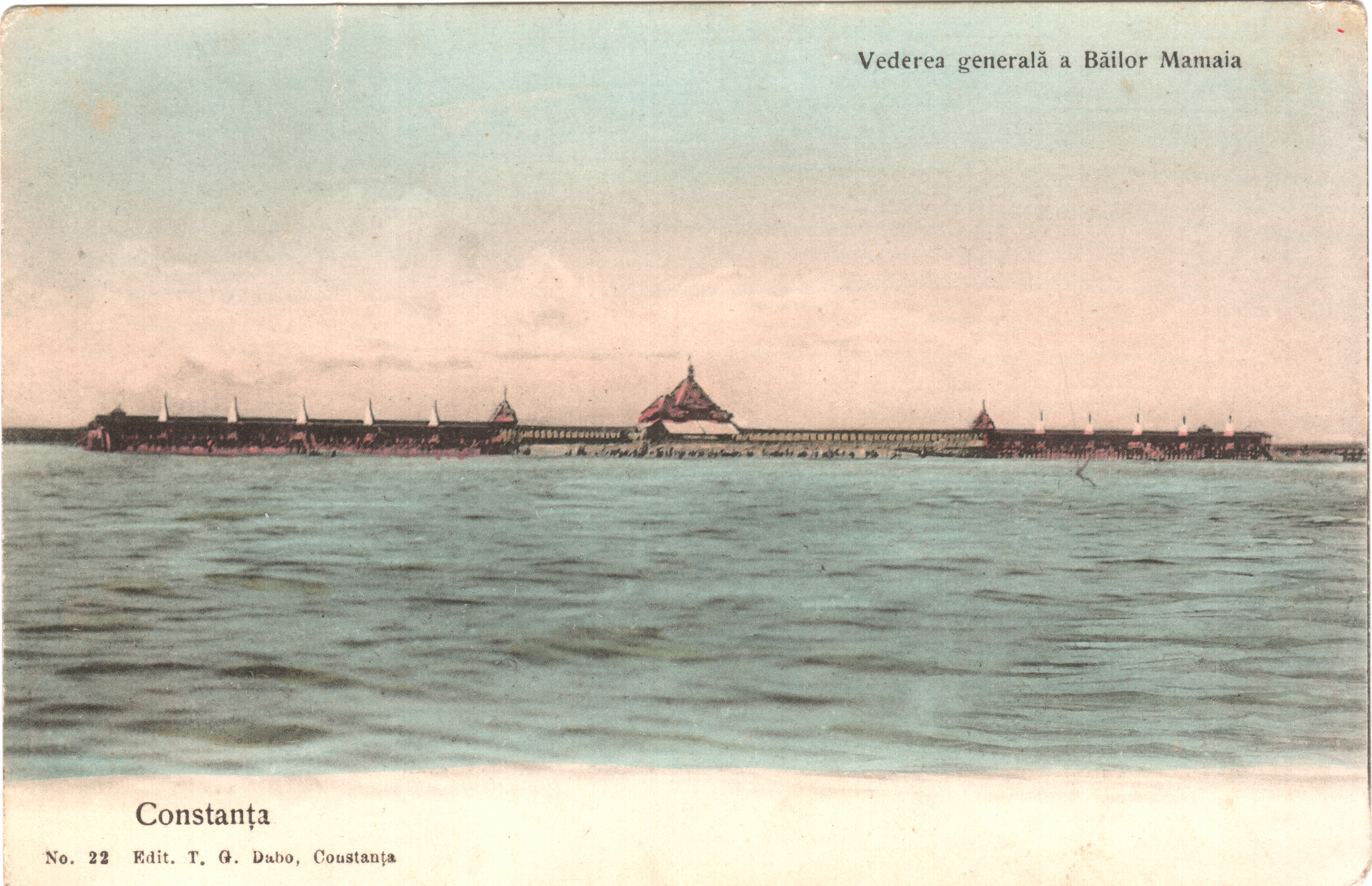
Beach house – 1916

== See also ==
- Tourism in Romania
