= Ovidiu =

- Town
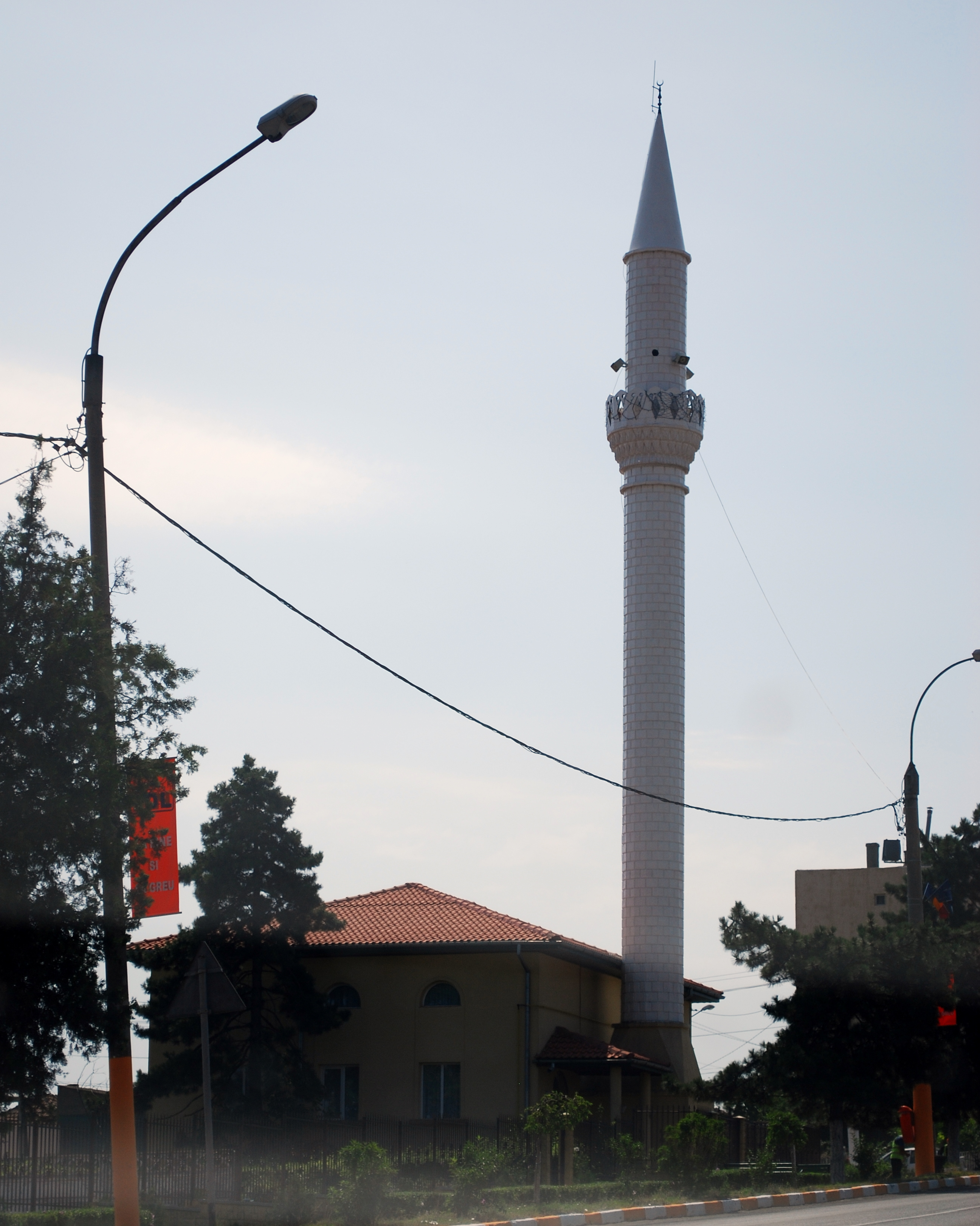
- Ovidiu mosque

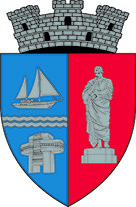
- Coat of arms

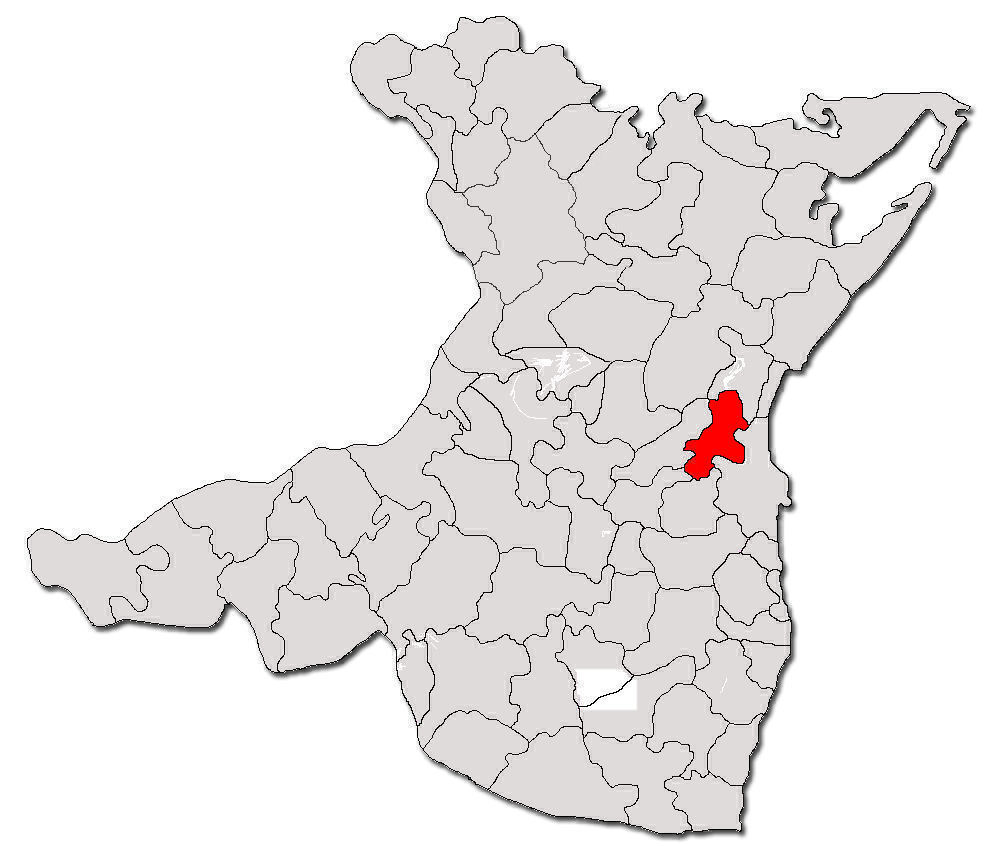
- Location in Constanța County

- Location in Romania
- Coordinates: 44°16′12″N 28°33′36″E
- Country: Romania
- County: Constanța
- Subdivisions: Poiana, Culmea

Government
  - Mayor (2024–2028): George Scupra (PNL)
- Area: 82.63 km^{2} (31.90 sq mi)
- Population (2021-12-01): 13,968
  - Density: 169.0/km^{2} (437.8/sq mi)
- Time zone: UTC+02:00 (EET)
  - Summer (DST): UTC+03:00 (EEST)
- Vehicle reg.: CT
- Website: www.primariaovidiu.ro

Ovidiu (Romanian pronunciation: [oˈvidju], historical name: Canara, Turkish: Kanara) is a town situated a few kilometres north of Constanța in Constanța County, Northern Dobruja, Romania. Ovidiu is quite small, with a population of 13,968 as of 2021, and many wealthy inhabitants of Constanța retire there. It officially became a town in 1989, as a result of the Romanian rural systematization program.

In 1930, the town was renamed Ovidiu after the Roman poet Ovid (Latin: Ovidius). He was supposedly buried on a nearby small island (also called Ovidiu) in the Siutghiol Lake.

== Administration ==
The town of Ovidiu administers the villages of Poiana (historical names: Cocoșul - until 1964, Turkish: Horozlar - until 1926) and Culmea. The latter was established in 2011 by legally separating from Ovidiu two territorially distinct communities, Social Group Culmea and Social Group Nazarcea.

== Sport ==
The stadium of FCV Farul Constanța is located in Ovidiu.

== Demographics ==
Historical population
Year	Pop.	±%
1992	12,591	—
2002	13,458	+6.9%
2011	13,847	+2.9%
2021	13,968	+0.9%
Source: Census data

At the 2021 census Ovidiu had a population of 13,968 with a majority of Romanians (72.07%) and minorities of Tatars (2.14%), Roma (1.25%), Turks (1.15%), Lipovans (0.07%), Hungarians (0.05%), Bulgarians (0.03%), others (0.13%) and unknown (23.11%).

At the 2011 census Ovidiu had a population of 13,847 with a majority of Romanians (81.01%) and minorities of Tatars (3.02%), Turks (2.51%), Roma (1.83%), Lipovans (0.06%), Greeks (0.04%), Germans (0.03%), others (0.13%) and unknown (11.37%).

== Natives ==
- Marius Leca

== Gallery ==
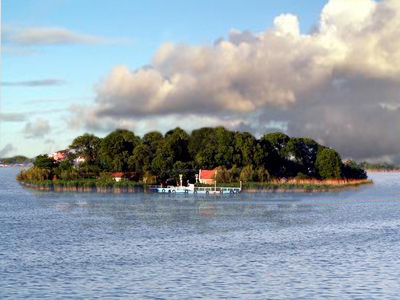
The Ovidiu island in the Siutghiol Lake
