= Puchenii Mari =

- Commune
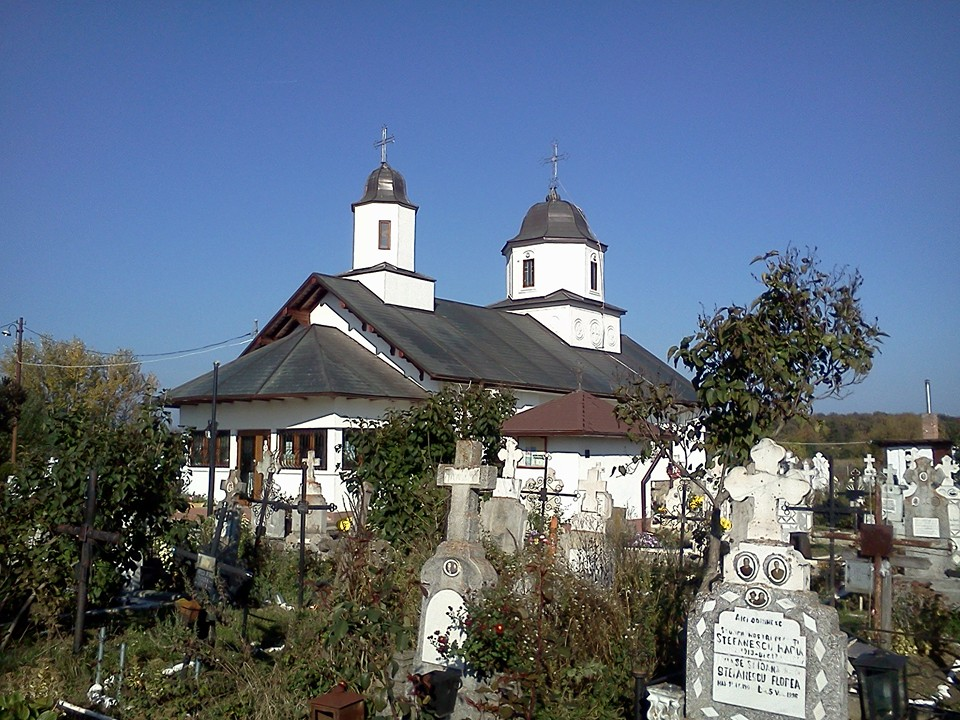
- The wooden church "Saints Archangels Michael and Gabriel" in Odăile

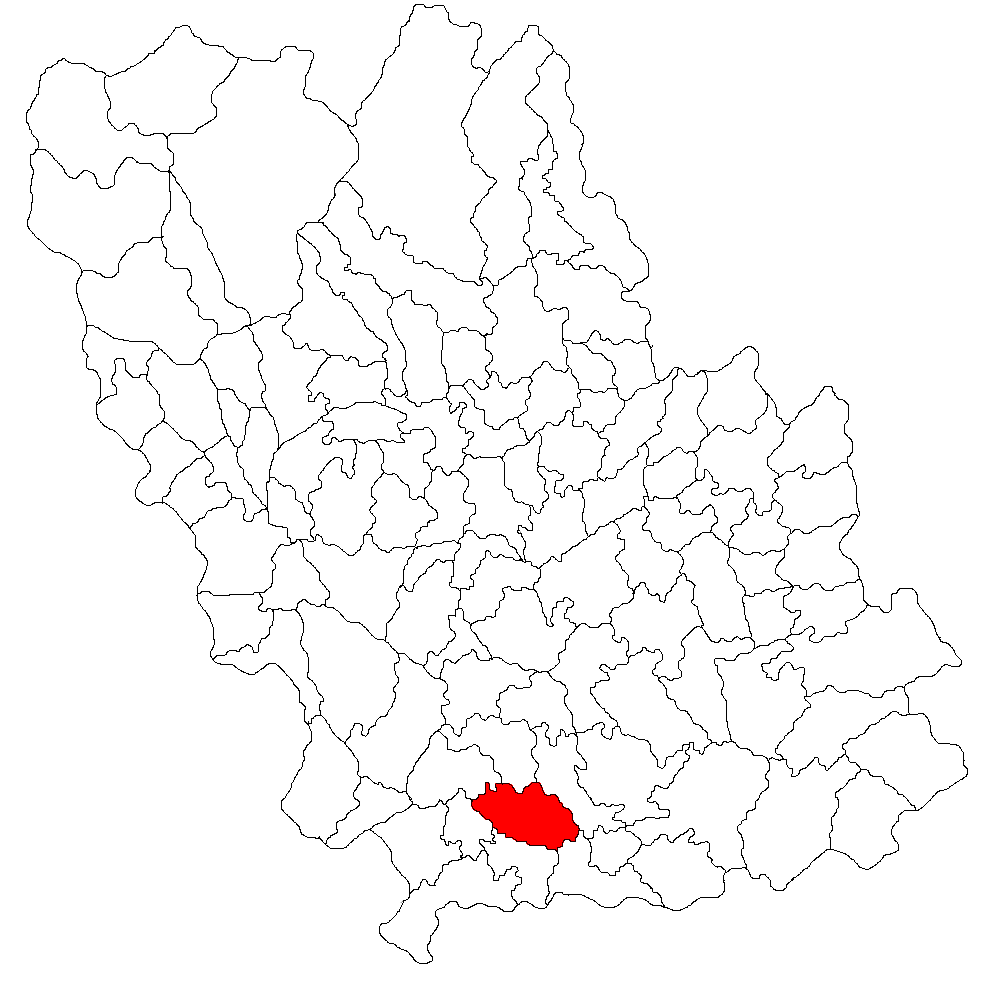
- Location in Prahova County

- Location in Romania
- Coordinates: 44°49′N 26°5′E
- Country: Romania
- County: Prahova

Government
  - Mayor (2024–2028): Constantin Negoi (PNL)
- Area: 54.92 km^{2} (21.20 sq mi)
- Elevation: 104 m (341 ft)
- Population (2021-12-01): 7,854
  - Density: 143.0/km^{2} (370.4/sq mi)
- Time zone: UTC+02:00 (EET)
  - Summer (DST): UTC+03:00 (EEST)
- Postal code: 107485
- Area code: +(40) 244
- Vehicle reg.: PH
- Website: www.pucheniimari.ro

Puchenii Mari is a commune in Prahova County, Muntenia, Romania. It is composed of seven villages: Miroslăvești, Moara, Odăile, Pietroșani, Puchenii Mari, Puchenii Mici, and Puchenii-Moșneni.

Most inhabitants of the commune work in the agricultural sector. The village of Odăile is also known for producing traditional Romanian fireplaces.

== Geography ==
The commune is located in a plain in the south of the county, on the left bank of the Prahova river, in the area of its lower course. It is crossed by the DN1 national road, which connects Ploiești with Bucharest. At Puchenii Mari, the DJ139 county roads branch off, leading east to Râfov and Berceni and west to Brazi and Târgșoru Vechi.

== Demographics ==
Historical population
Year	Pop.	±%
1992	9,208	—
2002	9,009	−2.2%
2011	8,825	−2.0%
2021	7,854	−11.0%
Source: Census data

At the 2021 census, the commune had a population of 7,854, of which 89.34% were ethnic Romanians.

Ethnic composition of Puchenii Mari (2021)
1. Romanians (89.3%)
2. Other (0.10%)
3. Unknown (10.6%)
Confessional composition of Puchenii Mari (2021)
1. Orthodox (87.2%)
2. Adventists (1.09%)
3. Other (0.51%)
4. Unknown (11.2%)

== Natives ==
- Simion Stolnicu (1905–1966), poet
- Florea Voinea (born 1941), footballer
