= Lists of domes =

There are a number of ways to categorize domes:

== By size ==
- List of largest domes
- List of tallest domes

== By location or origin ==
- List of domes in France
- List of Roman domes
- List of Ottoman domes
