= List of Ottoman domes =

This is a list of domes in Ottoman architecture.

== Domes ==
Diameter ⌀		Name, Part	Location	Built	Comments and citations
m	ft	Name, Part	Location	Built	Comments and citations
31.22	102.4	Selimiye Mosque	Edirne	1574	Largest Ottoman dome. Ottoman biographies of Mimar Sinan, the architect, praised the dome for equaling in width that of the Hagia Sophia in Istanbul in width; the first time that this had been achieved in Ottoman architecture. For comparison: the slightly elliptical dome of the Hagia Sophia has a diameter ranging from 30.9 to 31.8 metres (101 to 104 ft). Sinan's biography claimed that the Selimiye dome is also higher, but this may refer to the fact that the dome is taller from its base to its apex, as the curvature of the Hagia Sophia's dome is flatter and thus less tall. From the ground level to its apex, the Selimiye dome is 42.5 metres (139 ft) high whereas the Hagia Sophia's is 55.6 metres (182 ft) high. The Selimiye dome also became the largest dome in the Islamic world at the time of its completion.
26.5	87	Süleymaniye Mosque	Istanbul	1558	The dome's diameter is equal to exactly half the height between its apex and the ground. It is the second-largest historic dome in Istanbul, after the Hagia Sophia.
26	85	Fatih Mosque, Istanbul	Istanbul	1470	This is the measurement of the original dome prior to its 1766 destruction by an earthquake. The mosque was rebuilt in its current form afterwards. The original dome was the largest Ottoman dome at the time of its construction, surpassed only by the Hagia Sophia's dome.
25.4	83	Nuruosmaniye Mosque	Istanbul	1755	In the present day, it is the third largest historic dome in Istanbul (after the Hagia Sophia and the Süleymaniye).
24.5	80	Yavuz Selim Mosque	Istanbul	1522	
24	79	Üç Şerefeli Mosque	Edirne	1447	The largest Ottoman dome at the time of its construction.
23.5	77	Sultan Ahmed Mosque	Istanbul	1616	
20.55	67.4	Bayezid II Mosque	Edirne	1488	Measurements of the diameter vary slightly between sources, with some citing 20.55 metres while others give the width of the domed hall as 20.25 metres.
20	66	Mihrimah Mosque	Istanbul	1565	
20	66	Yildirim Bayezid I Mosque	Mudurnu	1389	Among the largest very early Ottoman domes, its size is more typical of later domes but it had to be built much closer to the ground on short walls in order to ensure stability.
19	62	Şehzade Mosque	Istanbul	1548	
17.5	57	New Mosque (Yeni Mosque)	Istanbul	1665	
17.5	57	Bayezid II Mosque	Istanbul	1506	
15	49	Banya Bashi Mosque	Sofia, Bulgaria	1566	
12.5	41	Yeşil Mosque	Bursa	1421	The current dome was reconstructed by French architect Léon Parvillée in the late 19th century, following the damage caused by the 1855 Bursa earthquake.

== See also ==
- Lists of domes
- List of world's largest domes
