= List of Roman domes =

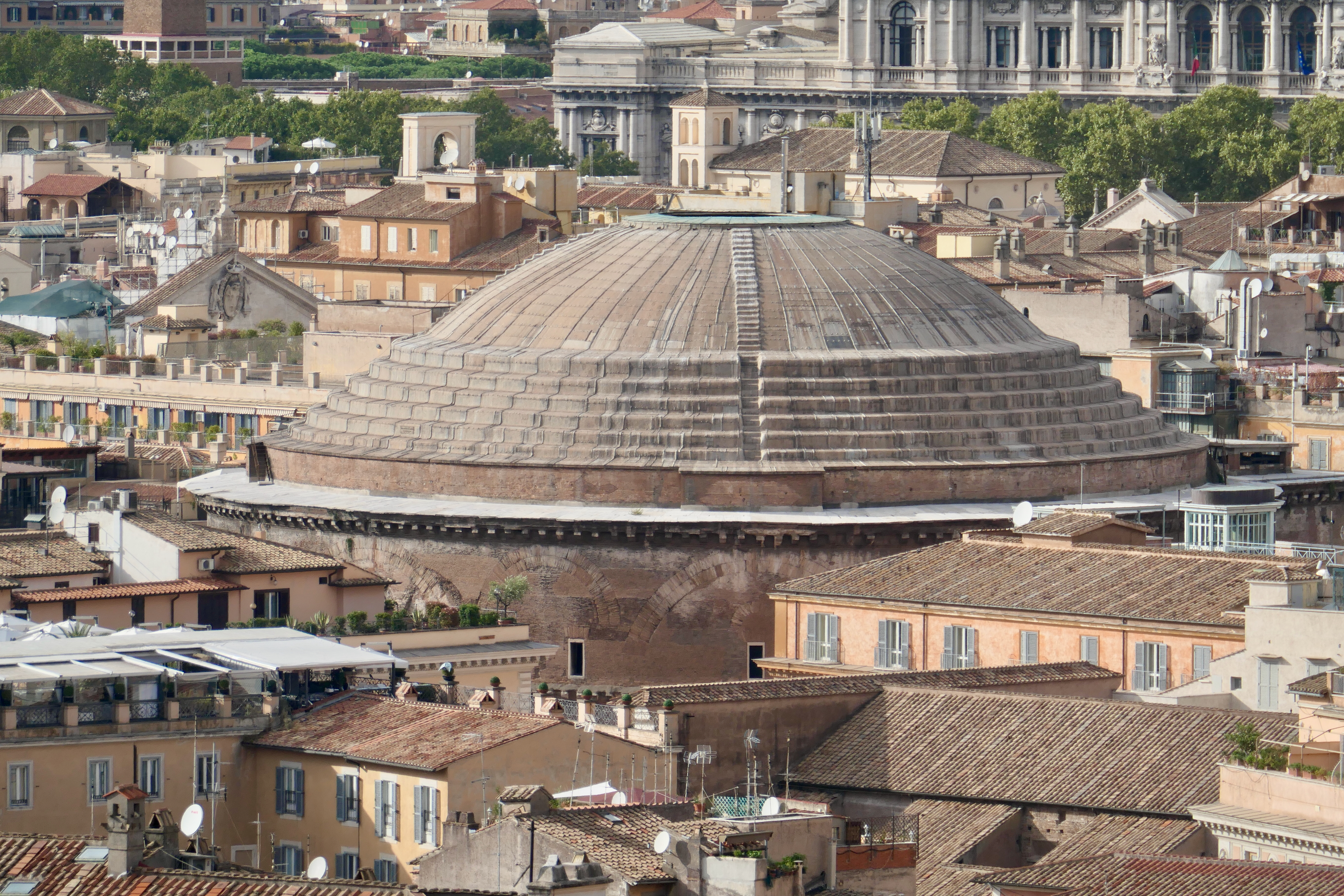
The Pantheon in Rome. Largest dome in the world for more than 1,300 years.

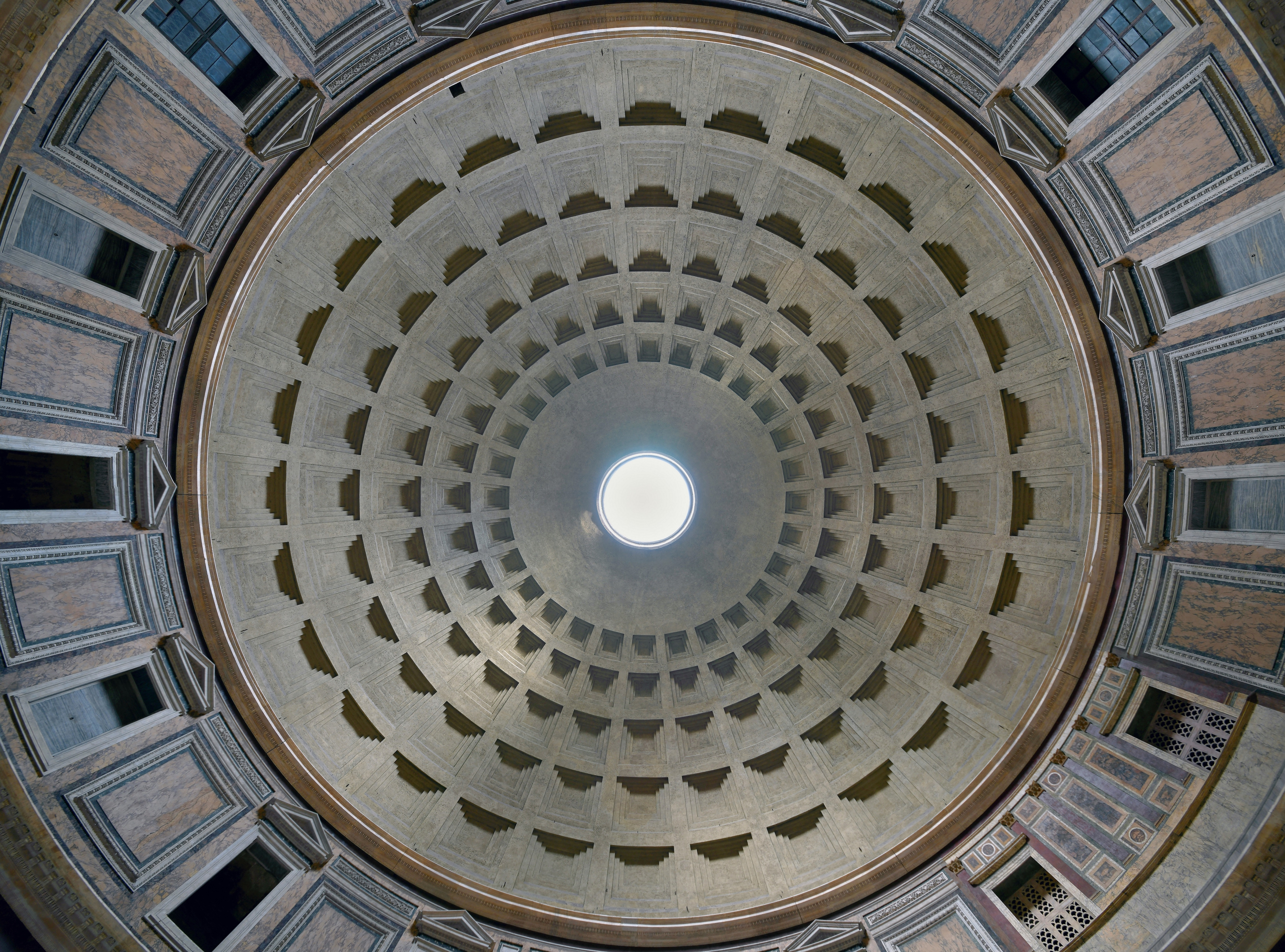
Oculus of the Pantheon

This is a list of Roman domes. The Romans were the first builders in the history of architecture to realize the potential of domes for the creation of large and well-defined interior spaces. Domes were introduced in a number of Roman building types such as temples, thermae, palaces, mausolea and later also churches. Semi-domes also became a favoured architectural element and were adopted as apses in Christian church architecture.

Monumental domes began to appear in the 1st century BC in Rome and the provinces around the Mediterranean Sea. Along with vaults and trusses, they gradually replaced the traditional post and lintel construction which makes use of the column and architrave. The construction of domes was greatly facilitated by the invention of concrete, a process which has been termed the Roman Architectural Revolution. Their enormous dimensions remained unsurpassed until the introduction of structural steel frames in the late 19th century (see List of largest domes).

== Domes ==
All diameters are clear span in m; for polygonal domes applies to the in-circle diameter. Main source is Jürgen Rasch's study of Roman domes (1985).

| Diameter 2 (m) | Name, Part | Location | Built | Shape of dome, Ground plan | Material, Roof construction | Shell Thickness ST (m) ST to ⌀ | Curtain Wall Thickness CWT (m) CWT to ⌀ | Diameter Oculus DO (m) DO to ⌀ | Comments/ Other Characteristics |
|---|---|---|---|---|---|---|---|---|---|
| ~ 43.45 | Pantheon | Rome | 126 AD | Rotunda | Concrete, Lead plate roofing | ~ 1.35; 1:32 | ~ 5.93; 1:7.3 | 8.95; 1:4.9 | Largest dome of the world until 1436; largest unreinforced solid concrete dome in the world till present; archetype of Western dome construction to this day |
| 38.20 | Temple of Apollo | Lake Avernus | 1st c. | | | | | | |
| ~ 35.08 | Baths of Caracalla, Caldarium | Rome | 3rd c. | | Amphoras | | | | Eight pillars; largest dome of the world out of ceramic hollowware |
| 29.50 | Temple of Diana | Baiae | 2nd c. | | | 1.20; 1:25 | ~ 5,70; 1:5.2 | | |
| 26.30 | Temple of Venus | Baiae | 2nd c. | | | - | ~ 2.90; 1:9.1 | | Outer wall pillars |
| 25.04 | Mausoleum of Maxentius | Rome | 4th c. | Rotunda | | | | | |
| 25.00 | Baths of Agrippa, 'Arco della Ciambella' | Rome | 1st c. BC | Rotunda | | | | | First Thermae in Rome with central dome; largest dome of the world |
| 24.15 | Arch of Galerius and Rotunda | Thessaloniki | 4th c. | | Brick | ~ 1; 1:24 | 6.00; 1:4 | | Largest brick dome of the world |
| 23.85 | Sanctuary of Asclepius | Pergamon | 2nd c. | | Brick | - | 3.35; 1:7.1 | | Earliest monumental brick dome; largest brick dome of the world |
| ~ 23.70 to ~ 19.80 | St. Gereon's Basilica | Cologne | 4th c. | Oval with eight niches and apse | | | | | Later medieval structure with Roman building fabric largest occidental dome between Hagia Sophia and Florence Cathedral |
| 23.65 | Temple of Minerva Medica | Rome | 4th c. | Decagon | Concrete with brick ribs | 0.56; 1:42 | ~ 2.60; 1:9.1 | | Outer wall pillars |
| ~ 22.00 | Baths of Antoninus | Carthage | 2nd c. | Polygon | | | | | Seven domes with diameters between 17 and 22 m |
| ~ 22.00 | Rotunda at the Hippodrome | Constantinople | 5th c. | Rotunda with ten niches | | | | | |
| ~ 22.00 | Baths of Diocletian, San Bernardo | Rome | ~ 300 | | Concrete with brick ribs | | | | |
| 21.65 or 21.25 | Baths of Diocletian, 'Planetarium' | Rome | ~ 300 | Umbrella dome, Octagon | Concrete with inner brick covering | | | 4.20; 1:5.1 | |
| 21.55 | Temple of Mercury | Baiae | 1st c. BC | | Concrete | | | 3.65; 1:5.9 | Earliest monumental dome; largest dome of the world |
| 20.18 | Mausoleum of Helena | Rome | 4th c. | | Ceramic amphora incorporated into dome's base | 0.90; 1:22 | 2.40; 1:8.4 | | |
| ~ 19.80 | Baths of Caracalla, Side building | Rome | 3rd c. | Octagon | | | | | Preliminary form of the pendentive dome |
| ~ 19.40 | Baths of Bacucco | Near Viterbo | 4th c. | Umbrella dome, Octagon | | | | | |
| 19.30 | Baths of Diocletian, Tepidarium | Rome | ~ 300 | | | | | 3.68; 1:5.2 | |
| 18.38 | Pantheon | Ostia | 3rd c. | | | - | 1.98; 1:9.3 | | |
| ~ 18.00 | Church of Euphemia | Constantinople | 5th c. | Hexagon | | | | | |
| 16.75 | Hadrian's Villa, 'Serapeum' | Tivoli | 2nd c. | Umbrella dome | Concrete | | | | Hollow space system |
| 16.45 | Imperial Baths, Tepidarium | Trier | 4th c. | | Concrete | | | | |
| 15.70 | Basilica of San Vitale | Ravenna | 6th c. | | Clay pipe, Wooden roof construction | | | | |
| ~ 15.60 | Nymphaeum in Albano Laziale | ? | 1st c. | | Concrete | | | 2.08; 1:7.6 | Earliest evidence for hollow spaces at dome's base for reduction in weight |
| ~ 15.00 to ~ 13.00 | Southern baths | Bosra | 3rd-4th c. | Octagon | Concrete | | | | |
| ~ 15.00 | Western baths | Jerash | 2nd c. | Square | Voussoir | | | | One of the earliest stone domes with square plan; largest stone dome of the world |
| 14.70 | Heroon of Romulus at the Roman Forum | Rome | 4th c. | | Lead plate roofing | 0.90; 1:16 | ~ 1.80; 1:8.2 | 3,70; 1:4.0 | |
| ~ 14.50 | Temple of Portunus | Porto | ~ 3rd c. | | Concrete with inner brick covering | - | ~ 2.20; 1:6.6 | | |
| 13.71 | Mausoleum of Tor de' Schiavi | Via Prenestina | 4th c. | | | 0.60; 1:23 | 2.60; 1:5.3 | | Four openings at dome's base |
| 13.48 | Domus Aurea | Rome | 1st c. | Cloister vault, Octagon | Concrete | | | 5.99; 1:2.3 | First dome with octagonal plan; earliest in palace architecture |
| 13.35 | Mausoleum of Diocletian | Split | ~ 300 | | Brick, Tiled roof | 0.68; 1:20 | 3.40; 1:3.9 | | Double-walled dome |
| 12.90 | Chapel of Saint Aquilino | Milan | 4th c. | | Brick | | | | |
| 12.33 | Tempio della Tosse | Tivoli | 4th c. | | Concrete with brick ribs | 1.30; 1:9 | 2.08; 1:5.9 | 2.10; 1:5.9 | |
| ~ 12.00 | Hadrian's Villa, Summer Triclinium (Exedra) | Tivoli | 2nd c. | | Concrete with inner brick covering | | | | |
| ~ 12.00 | Baths of Aquae Flavianae | El Hammam | 3rd c. | | Clay pipes | | | | Largest dome of the world out of ceramic hollowware |
| ~ 12.00 | Church of Hodegetria | Constantinople | 5th c. | Hexagon | | | | | |
| ~ 12.00 | Skeuophylakion | Constantinople | ~ 5th c. | Dodecagon | | | | | |
| 11.90 | Baptistery | Nocera Superiore; Campania | 6th c. | | | | | | Eight rectangular dome windows |
| ~ 11.90 | Hadrian's Villa, 'Heliocaminus' | Tivoli | 2nd c. | | | | | | Double-walled dome with spacing for ceiling heating |
| 11.50 | Red Basilica | Pergamon | ~ 2nd c. | | Brick | | | | Two Rotunda; largest brick dome of the world |
| 11.50 | Santa Costanza | Rome | 4th c. | | Concrete with brick ribs, Tiled roof directly resting on dome shell | ~ 0.70; 1:16 | 1.45; 1:7.9 | | Tambour |
| ~ 11.50 | Mor Gabriel Monastery | Tur Abdin | 6th c. | | Brick | | | yes | |
| 11.47 | Praetorium | Cologne | 4th c. | Octagon | | - | 2.00; 1:5.7 | | |
| 11.10 | Gordian's Villa | Rome, Via Prenestina | 3rd c. | Octagon | | - | ~ 1.35; 1:8.2 | | Preliminary form of the pendentive dome; eight openings at dome's base |
| 11.00 | Therme d’Allance | ? | ? | | | | | | |
| ~ 10.80 | Mausoleum of Gallien | Rome, Via Appia | 3rd c. | Rotunda with six niches | | - | ~ 1.60; 1:6.8 | | |
| 10.70 | Mausoleum of Centocelle | Centcelles, near Tarragona | 4th c. | | Brick and stone | ~ 0.40; 1:27 | ~ 1.90; 1:5.6 | | |
| ~ 10.40 to ~ 9.40 | Hadrian's Villa, small baths | Tivoli | 2nd c. | Elliptical dome with wavelike rim | | | | | |
| ~ 10.00 | Gordian's Villa, Hall | Via Prenestina | ~ 2nd c. | | | | | | |
| ~ 10.00 | Villa delle Vignacce | Via Latina | 2nd c. | | Ceramic amphora at dome's base | | | | Earliest known use of amphora at dome's base |
| 9.85 | Cathedral, Baptistery | Ravenna | 5th c. | | | | | | |
| 9.50 | Rotunda of St. George, Sofia | Sofia | early 4th c. | Rotunda | | | | | Built by the Romans in the 4th century, it is a cylindrical domed structure built on a square base. |
| ~ 9.50 | Hadrian's Villa, Piazza d'Oro (vestibule) | Tivoli | 2nd c. | Umbrella dome | | | | ~ 1,90; 1:5.0 | |
| ~ 9.50 | Praetextat catacomb, 'Calventier tomb' | Rome | 3rd c. | Rotunda with six niches | | | | | |
| ~ 9.00 | Capito Thermae, Laconicum | Miletus | 1st c. | | Concrete | | | | |
| ~ 9.00 | Small Roundtemple | Baalbek | 3rd c. | | | | | | |
| ~ 8.50 | Domus Augustana | Rome | 1st c. | Cloister vault, Octagon | | | | | One of the earliest cloister vaults with octagonal curtain walls |
| 8.10 | Torraccio del Palombaro | Rome, Via Appia | ~ 4th c. | | | ~ 0.90; 1:9 | 2,30; 1:3.5 | ~ 1.50; 1:5.4 | |
| ~ 7.70 | Baths of Maxentius | Rome | 4th c. | Umbrella dome, Octagon | | | | | |
| 7.60 | Domus Flavia | Rome | 1st c. | | | | | | |
| ~ 7.60 to ~ 6.20 | Hadrian's Villa, 'Heliocaminus' | ? | 2nd c. | Cloister vault, Uneven octagon | | | | | |
| ~ 6.80 | Nymphaeum | Riza, Epirus | ~ 250-350 | Dodecagon | | | | | |
| ~ 6.75 | Temple of Venus, Annex building | Baiae | 2nd c. | Flat umbrella dome, Octagon | | | | | |
| 6.65 | Hall of Thermae Pisa | ? | ~ 2nd c. | Cloister vault with eight windows, Octagon | | | | 2.00; 1:3.3 | |
| 6.52 | Stabian Thermae, Laconicum | Pompeii | 1st c. BC | Cone vault (early form of the dome) | Concrete | | | yes | Oldest known concrete domes |
| ~ 6.00 | Hunting Thermae | Leptis Magna | ~ 200 | Cloister vault with eight windows | | | | | |
| 5.86 | Arch of Marcus Aurelius | Tripoli | ? | Cloister vault | Voussoir | | | | |
| ~ 5.70 | Water Castellum | Pompeii | 30 BC- 14 AD | Flat dome | | | | | |
| 5.40 | Octagon near 'Temple of Mercury' | Baiae | 2nd c. | Umbrella dome, Octagon | | | | | |
| ~ 5.40 | San Vitale, Stair towers | Ravenna | 6th c. | | Brick | | | | |
| 5.20 | Sedia del Diavolo, Tomb | Rome, Via Nomentana | 2nd c. | Square | | | | | |
| ~ 4.70 | Tabularium | Rome | 1st c. BC | Cloister vault, Square | | | | | Earliest cloister vault |
| 4.41 | Temple of Venus, Annex building | Baiae | 2nd c. | Umbrella dome above circular ground plan | | | | 0.59; 1:7.5 | |
| ~ 4.40 | Mausoleum of Galla Placidia | Ravenna | 5th c. | | Tiled roof | | | | |
| ~ 4.00 | Tomb at Casal de' Pazzi | Rome, Via Nomentana | 2nd c. | In-circle dome, Square | Concrete | | | | Preform of pendentive dome; hollow space system |
| 1.65 | Villa of the Mysteries, Laconicum | Pompeii | 1st c. BC | Cone vault (early form of the dome) | Brick and clay (upper calotte) | | | | Concrete wall shell |
| ? | Mausoleum of Constantine at the Church of the Holy Apostles | Constantinople | 4th c. | Presumably Rotunda with twelve niches | | | | | |

== Half-domes ==
| Diameter ⌀ | Name, Part | Location | Built | Shape of dome, Ground plan | Material, Roof construction | Shell thickness (ST) ST to ⌀ | Curtain wall thickness (CWT) CWT to ⌀ | Comments/ Other characteristics |
|---|---|---|---|---|---|---|---|---|
| ~ 30.00 | Baths of Trajan | Rome | ? | | | | | Largest dome(s) of the world |
| ~ 22.00 | Baths of Diocletian, Two apse halls | Rome | ~ 300 | | | | | |
| ~ 18.50 | Trajan's Forum | Rome | ? | | | | | |
| ~ 15.80 | Santi Cosma e Damiano, Apse | Rome | 6th c. | | | | | |
| ~ 11.00 | Nymphaeum | Jerash | 2nd c. | | Concrete | | | |
| ~ 9.60 | Basilica, Apse | Bostra | ~ 3rd c. | | Concrete, inside covered with ashlar | | | |
| ~ 8.00 | Cathedral, Annex rooms | Bostra | 6th c. | | Concrete | | | |
| ~ 5.70 | Pantheon, Front niches | Rome | 2nd c. | | | | | |

== See also ==
- Record-holding domes in antiquity
- List of world's largest domes
- List of Domes in France
- Ancient Roman and Byzantine domes
- Ancient Roman architecture
- Early and simple domes

== Sources ==
Main source

- Rasch, Jürgen (1985), "Die Kuppel in der römischen Architektur. Entwicklung, Formgebung, Konstruktion", Architectura, vol. 15, pp. 117–139

Further sources

- Bishop, John (1977), "The Pantheon: Design, Meaning, and Progeny (Review)", Art Journal, vol. 37, no. 1, p. 92
- Heinle, Erwin; Schlaich, Jörg (1996), Kuppeln aller Zeiten, aller Kulturen, Stuttgart, ISBN 3-421-03062-6
- Heinz, Werner (1983), Römische Thermen. Badewesen und Badeluxus im römischen Reich, München, pp. 60–64, ISBN 3-7774-3540-6
- Lechtman, Heather; Hobbs, Linn (1986), "Roman Concrete and the Roman Architectural Revolution. Ceramics and Civilization", in Kingery, W. D. (ed.), High Technology Ceramics: Past, Present, Future, vol. 3, American Ceramics Society
- Mark, Robert; Hutchinson, Paul (1986), "On the Structure of the Roman Pantheon", Art Bulletin, vol. 68, no. 1, pp. 24–34, doi:10.2307/3050861, JSTOR 3050861
- Müller, Werner (2005), dtv-Atlas Baukunst I. Allgemeiner Teil: Baugeschichte von Mesopotamien bis Byzanz (14th ed.), München, ISBN 3-423-03020-8
- Schäfke, Werner (1985), Kölns romanische Kirchen. Architektur, Ausstattung, Geschichte (5th ed.), Köln, ISBN 3-7701-1360-8
