= Rasova, Constanța =

Rasova
- Commune
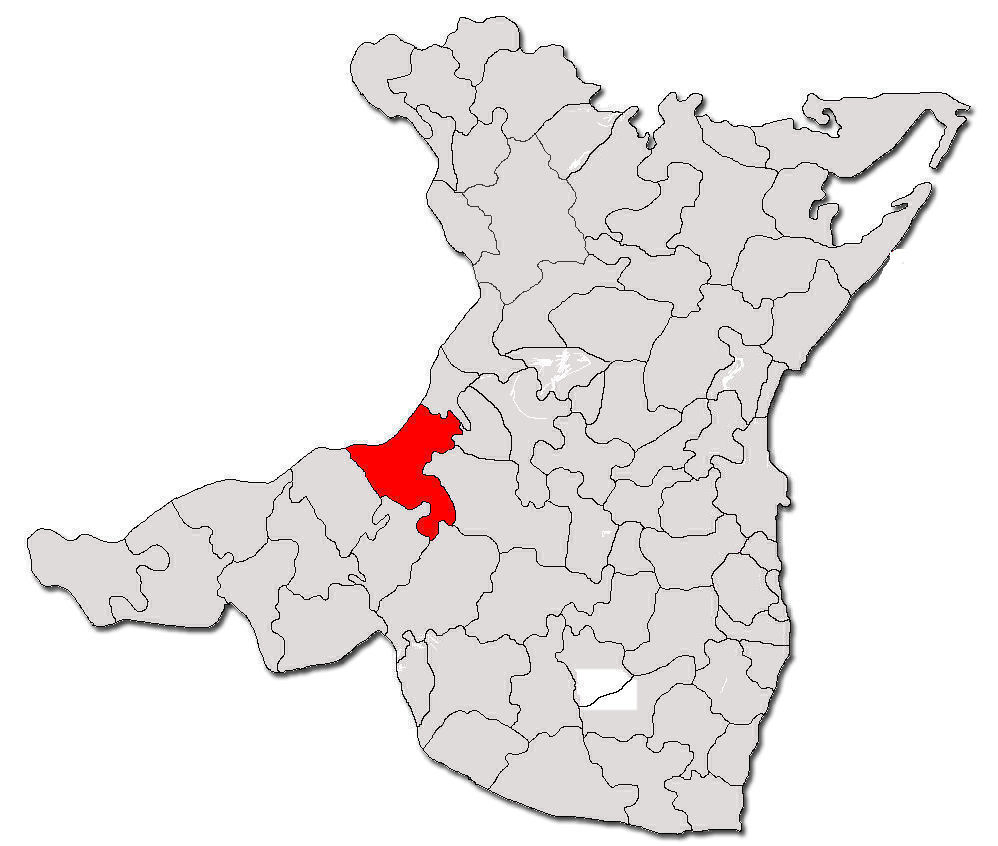
- Location in Constanța County

- Location in Romania
- Coordinates: 44°14′45″N 27°56′04″E
- Country: Romania
- County: Constanța
- Subdivisions: Rasova, Cochirleni

Government
  - Mayor (2020–2024): Mihalache Neamțu (PNL)
- Area: 111.58 km^{2} (43.08 sq mi)
- Population (2021-12-01): 3,347
  - Density: 30.00/km^{2} (77.69/sq mi)
- Time zone: UTC+02:00 (EET)
  - Summer (DST): UTC+03:00 (EEST)
- Vehicle reg.: CT
- Website: www.primaria-rasova.ro

Rasova (Romanian pronunciation: [ˈrasova]) is a commune in Constanța County, Northern Dobruja, Romania. It includes two villages:

- Rasova
- Cochirleni

The village of Rasova was the first capital of the Silistra Nouă County, which existed between 1878 and 1879.

== Demographics ==
At the 2011 census, Rasova had 3,550 Romanians (99.97%) and 1 other (0.03%).
