= Medgidia (river) =

- Location within Romania

Location
- Country: Romania
- Counties: Constanța County
- Villages: Valea Dacilor, Medgidia, Remus Opreanu

Physical characteristics
- Mouth: Danube–Black Sea Canal
  - location: near Medgidia
  - coordinates: 44.2588°N 28.2085°E
- Length: 13 km (8.1 mi)
- Basin size: 42 km^{2} (16 sq mi)

Basin features
- Progression: Danube–Black Sea Canal→ Black Sea
- River code: XV.1.10b.4

The Medgidia (also: Valea Medgidiei) is a small river in Constanța County, Romania. It discharges into the Danube–Black Sea Canal in Remus Opreanu. Its length is 13 km (8.1 mi) and its basin size is 42 km^{2} (16 sq mi).
