= List of largest domes =

A dome is a self-supporting structural element of architecture that resembles the hollow upper half of a sphere.

Every dome in the world which was the largest-diameter dome of its time is listed.

Notes:

- Each structure is only described in detail once (the appearance closest to the top of the page), even if it appears on multiple lists. A link to the row where the structure is described in detail is provided.
- The dimension given is the inner diameter (also called inside diameter, or clear span). The thickness of the dome is not included. If the inner diameter of a dome is not available, a footnote follows the structure's name.
- If a dome has an elliptical rather than circular shape, the dome's shorter dimension (i.e. width) is used for ranking, and, contra convention, its dimensions are listed as width × length, rather than length × width.
- If the structure is part of a well-known complex of buildings, the name of the entire site is listed first, with the name of the dome structure listed in small text below.
- These lists exclude structures that are not self-supporting, such as The O2 in London which is 365 m (1,200 ft) in diameter but is supported by masts.
- The name of a structure used is the name it had when it was constructed or first opened. This is particularly relevant regarding stadiums.

== Chronology of the largest dome ==
List of dome structures that have been the largest dome in the world:

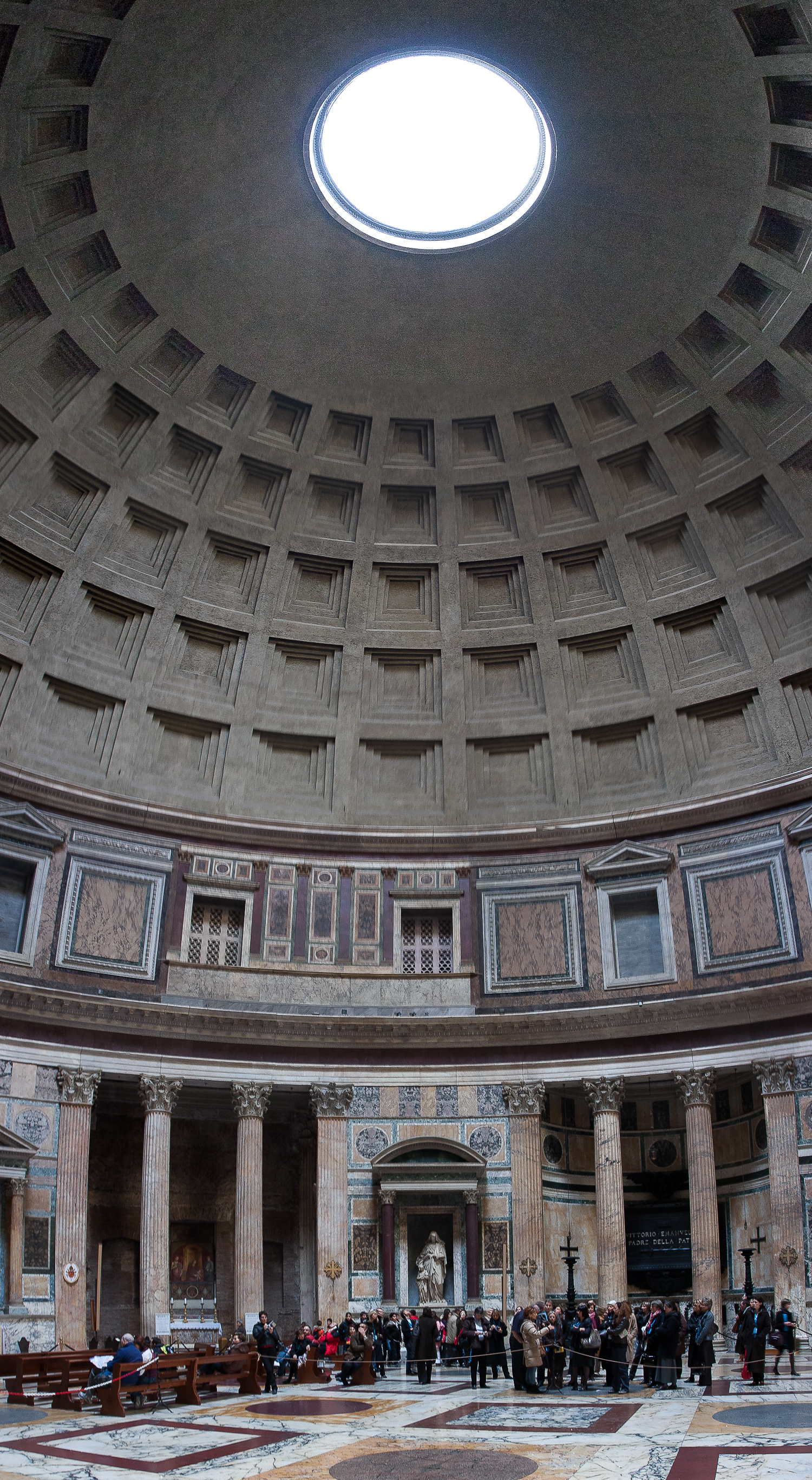
The Pantheon in Rome, built in the 2nd century, was the largest dome in the world for over a millennium, and is still the largest unreinforced solid concrete dome.

The dome of Florence Cathedral was the largest in the world from its construction in 1436 to 1871, and is the largest brick and mortar dome.

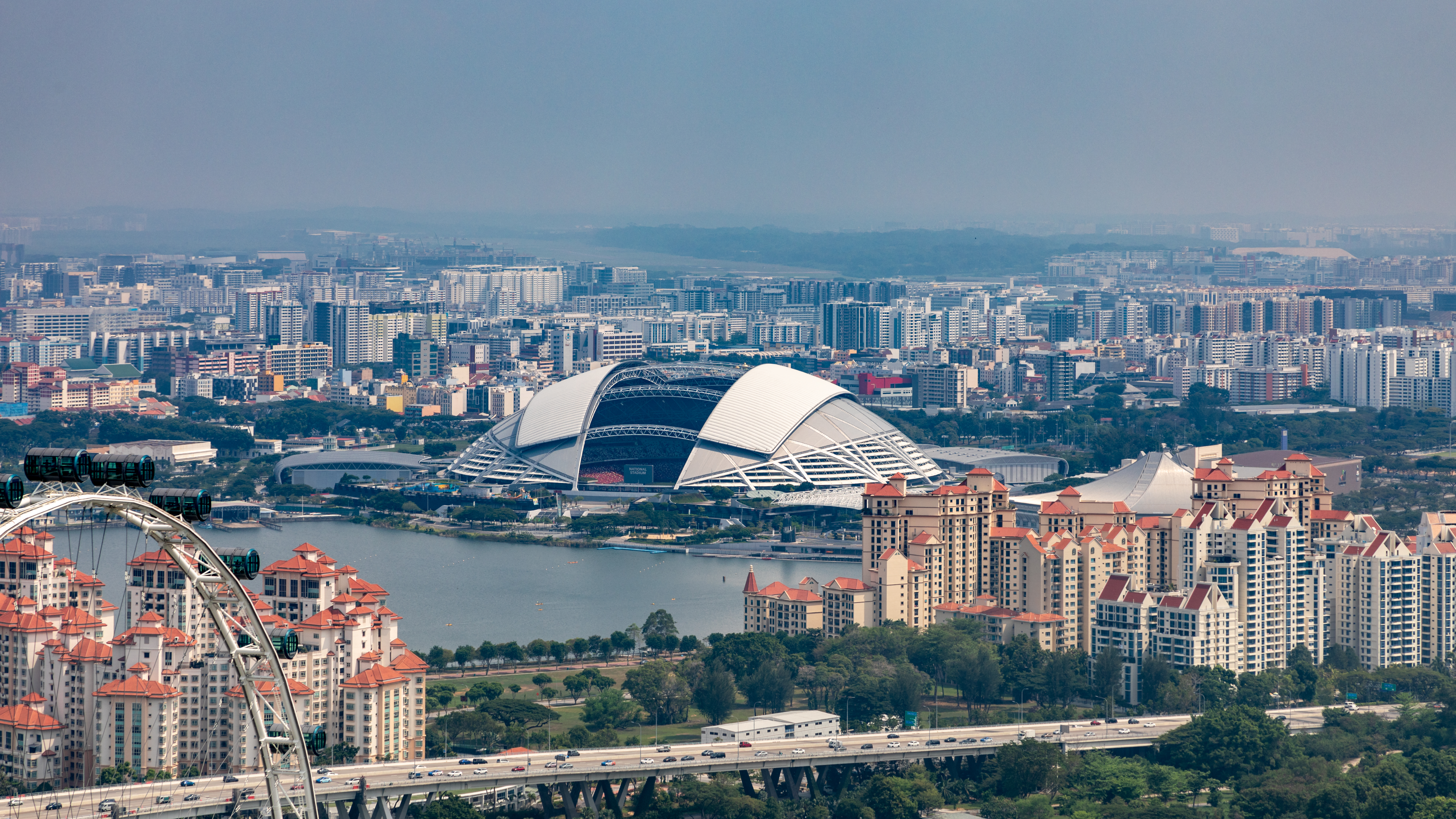
The Singapore National Stadium, the largest dome structure in the world, and the largest ever built

Held record (Note: First stint as largest dome only, may have gaps due to destructions. Domes no longer standing marked with an asterisk.)	Diameter		Name	Location	Builder	Notes	References
Held record	m	ft	Name	Location	Builder	Notes	References
1250 BC – 1st century BC	14.5	47.6	Treasury of Atreus	Mycenae, Greece	City-state of Mycenae	Corbel dome	
1st century BC – 19 BC	21.55	70.70	Temple of Mercury	Baiae, Italy	Roman Empire	First monumental dome	
19 BC – start of 2nd century AD*	25	82	Baths of Agrippa; Arco della Ciambella	Rome, Italy	Roman Empire	First thermae in Rome with a domed central building	
Start of 2nd century AD – 128*	30	100	Baths of Trajan	Rome, Italy	Roman Empire	Half dome	
128–1436	43.4	142	Pantheon	Rome, Italy	Roman Empire	Largest unreinforced solid concrete dome in the world. Archetype of Western dome construction.	
1436–1871	45.5	149	Florence Cathedral	Florence, Italy	City-state of Florence	Largest brick and mortar dome in the world. First double-dome structure of the Renaissance. Octagonal dome. Architect Filippo Brunelleschi.	
1871–1873	56.5 × 66.9	185 1/3 × 219 1/3	Royal Albert Hall	London, United Kingdom	Lucas Brothers	Wrought iron and glazed (glass) elliptical dome. Architects Captain Francis Fowke and Henry Young Darracott Scott.	
1873–1937*	101.7	333.66	Rotunde	Vienna, Austria	Johann Caspar Harkort VI.	Destroyed by a fire in 1937. Architect Baron Karl von Hasenauer.	
1937–1955	65.8	216	Wholesale Market Leipzig	Leipzig, Germany	Dyckerhoff & Widmann	Reinforced concrete dome. Architect Franz Dischinger.	
1955–1957	101	332 1/3	Charlotte Coliseum (Note: Not to be confused with the later Charlotte Coliseum, an indoor arena not featuring a dome that was demolished in 2007.)	Charlotte, United States	Thompson and Street	Structural steel dome. Architect Odell Associates.	
1957–1963	109	358	Belgrade Fair – Hall 1	Belgrade, Serbia	Belgrade Fair in Construction	World's largest prestressed concrete dome	
1963–1964	122	400	Assembly Hall	Champaign, United States	Felmley-Dickerson Co.	Reinforced concrete dome. Architect Max Abramovitz.	
1964–1975	196	642	Astrodome	Houston, United States	H.A. Lott, Inc.	First domed stadium. First air-conditioned stadium. Structural steel dome (3,000 tons of structural steel). Architects Lloyd & Morgan, and Wilson, Morris, Crain and Anderson.	
1975–1984	207	680	Louisiana Superdome	New Orleans, United States	Blount International	Structural steel construction (18,000 tons of structural steel in entire structure). Architects Curtis and Davis Architects and Engineers, Edward 8. Silverstein and Associates, and Nolan, Norman and Nolan.	
1984–1985*	236.5	775.9	Istra dome	Istra, Russia	Glavspetsstroy	Steel construction (≈10,000 tons of steel and ≈363 tons of aluminum). Collapsed on 25 January 1985, later demolished.	
2001–2013	274	899	Oita Stadium	Ōita, Japan	Takenaka Corporation, SATO BENEC, and Takayama Sogo Kogyo	Retractable steel roof (12,500 tonnes of steel). Architects Kisho Kurokawa Architect & Associates, Takenaka Corporation, Satobenec, and Takayama Sogo Kogyo.	
since 2013	312	1,020	Singapore National Stadium	Singapore	Dragages	Retractable roof. Height of dome: 80 m (260 ft). Architect Arup Group.	

== By structural material ==
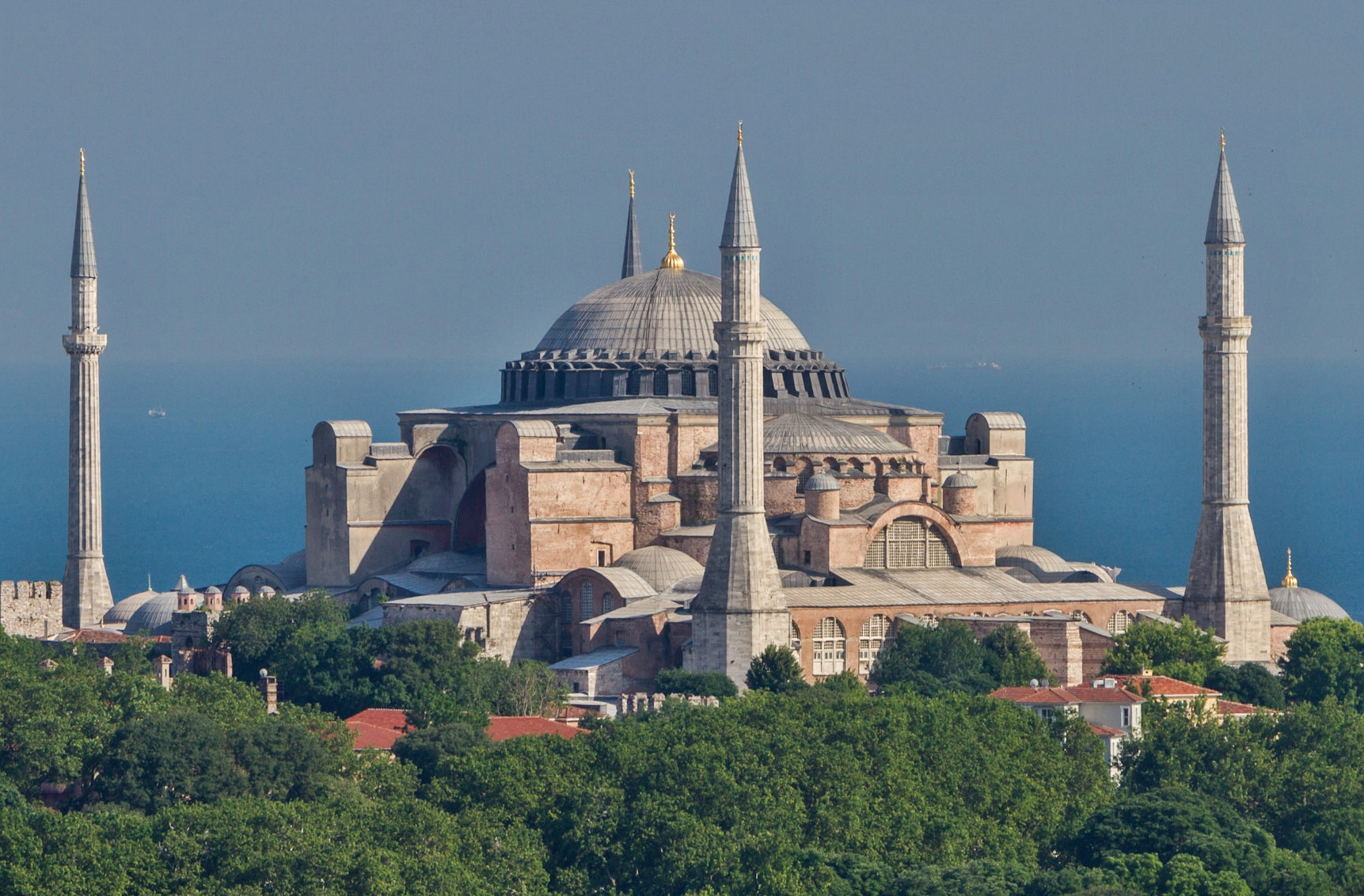
The Hagia Sophia, the largest brick-and-mortar dome for almost a millennium, from its construction in 563 until the completion of the Florence Cathedral in 1436

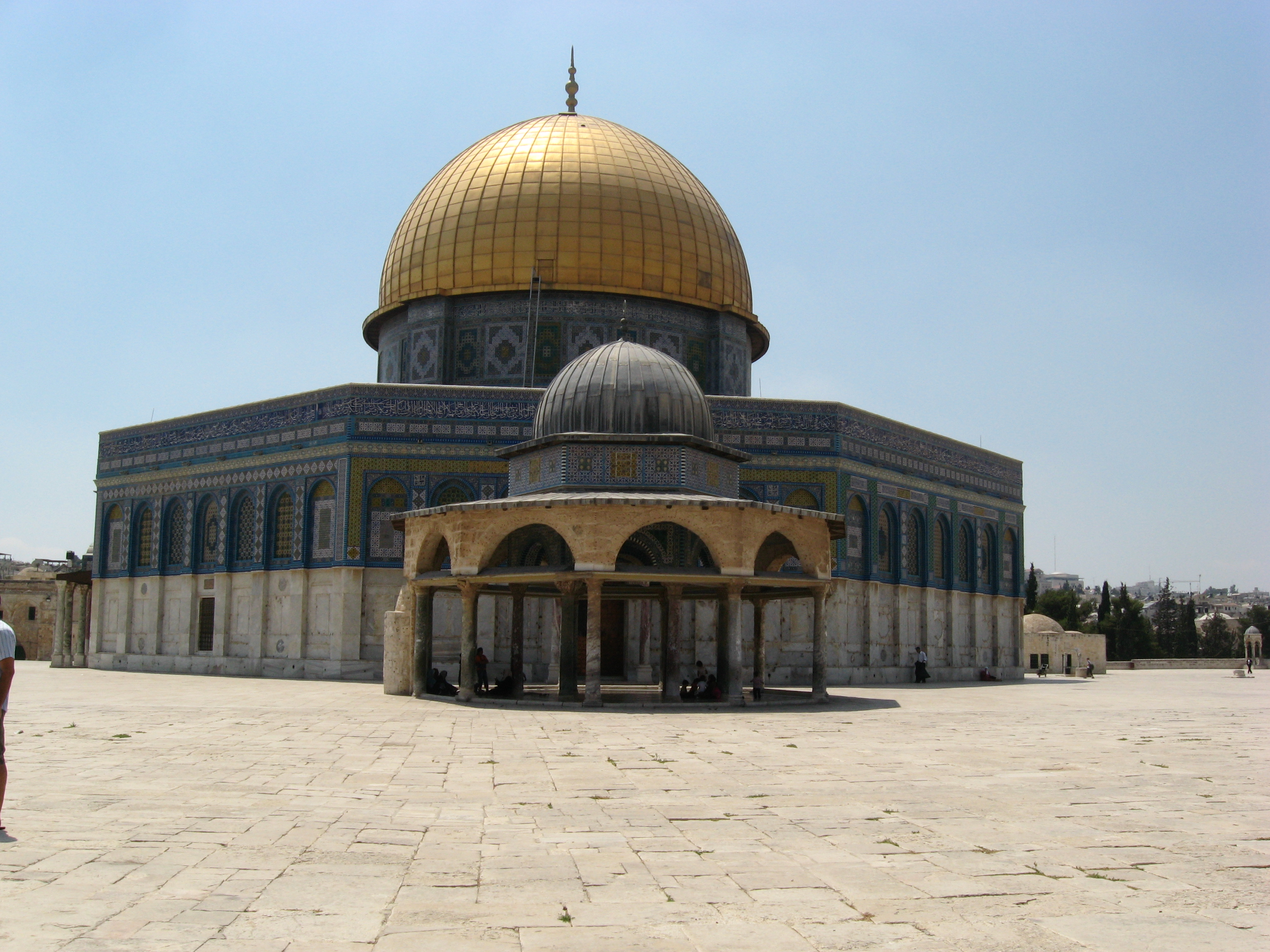
The Dome of the Rock in Jerusalem, the largest wooden dome for over a millennium

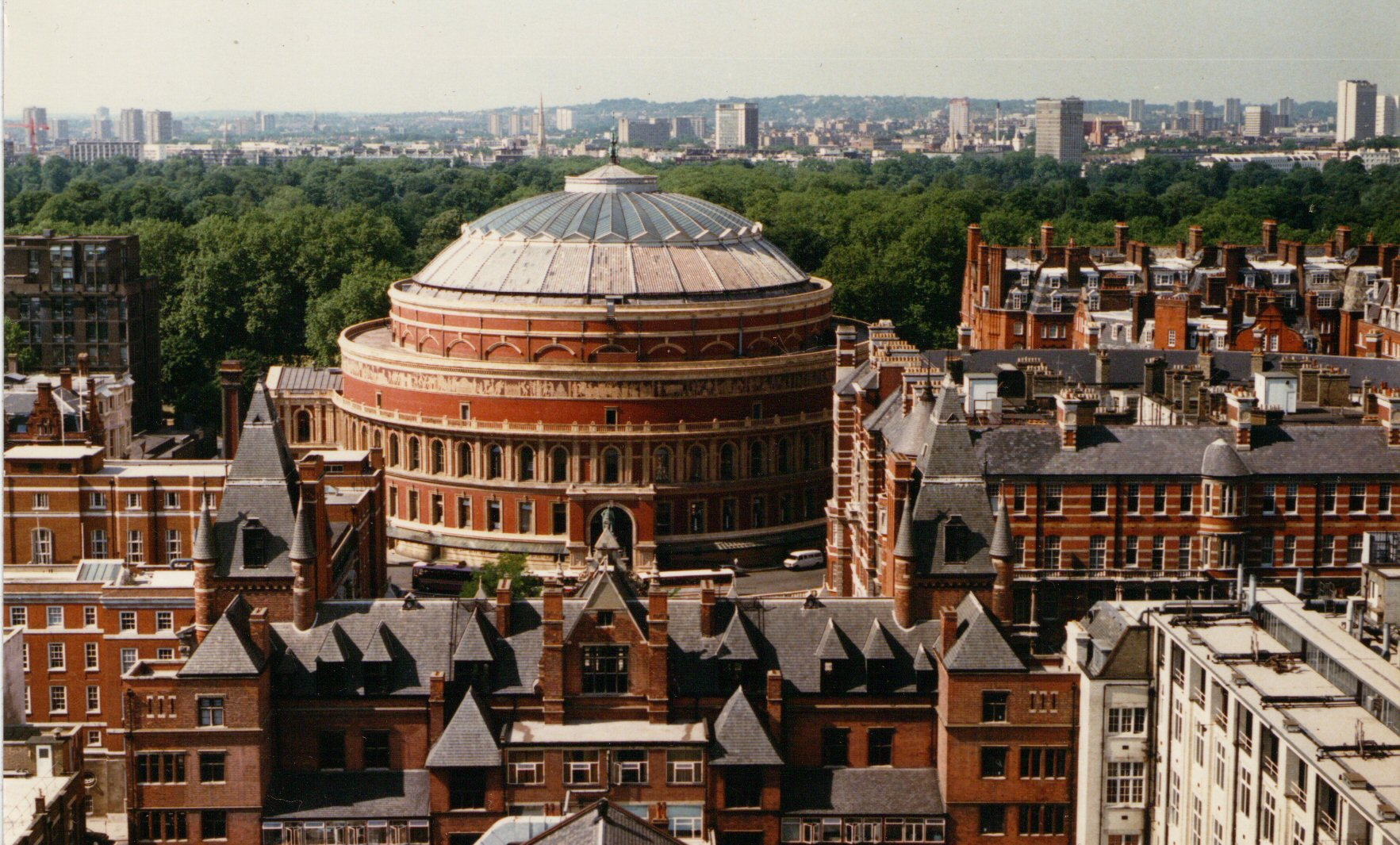
The Royal Albert Hall is the largest standing dome structure of wrought iron construction. However, the Rotunde, completed two years after the Royal Albert Hall, is the largest wrought iron dome ever built.

Lists of buildings that have been the largest dome built with a given structural material:

Held record	Diameter		Name	Location	Builder	Notes	References
Held record	m	ft	Name	Location	Builder	Notes	References
Stone
1250 BC – 150–175 AD			Treasury of Atreus (details earlier)				
150–175 AD – 2006	15.0	49.2	Western Thermae	Jerash, Jordan	Roman Empire	One of the earliest voussoir domes with square ground plan	
since 2006	85.15	279.4	Global Vipassana Pagoda	Mumbai, India		The stone dome was completed in October 2006. The monument was officially inaugurated on February 8, 2009.	
Concrete
1st century BC – 1st century BC	6.52	21.4	Stabiae Thermae; Laconicum	Pompeii, Italy	Roman Empire	Cone vault (early form of a dome). Oldest known dome built with Roman concrete.	
1st century BC – 19 BC			Temple of Mercury (details earlier)				
since 128			Pantheon (details earlier)				
Masonry
2nd century – 150	11.5	38	Red Basilica	Pergamon, Turkey	Roman Empire	Brick	
150 – c. 306*	23.85	78.2	Sanctuary of Asclepius; Temple of Asclepius	Pergamon, Turkey	Roman Empire	Earliest monumental brick dome	
c. 306 – 563	24.15	79.2	Rotunda of Galerius	Thessaloniki, Greece	Roman Empire	Radially laid bricks	
563–1436	30.87 × 31.87	101.3 × 104.6	Hagia Sophia	Istanbul, Turkey	Byzantine Empire	First pendentive dome in history, completed in 537, rebuilt in 563 after earthquake. Architects Anthemius of Tralles and Isidore of Miletus	
since 1436			Florence Cathedral (details earlier)				
Clay hollowware
Beginning of 3rd century – 216	12.0	39.4	Aquae Flavianae	El Hamma District, Algeria	Roman Empire	Earthenware pipes put together	
216 – 6th–9th century*	35.08	115.1	Baths of Caracalla; Caldarium	Rome, Italy	Roman Empire	Amphorae put together	
Wood
691–1781	20.40	66.9	Dome of the Rock	Jerusalem	Umayyad Empire		
1781–1957	36.0	118.1	Saint Blaise Abbey	Sankt Blasien, Germany	Pierre Michel d'Ixnard	Third-widest dome in Europe at the time of its construction	
1957–1977	91.4	300	Brick Breeden Fieldhouse	Bozeman, United States	Montana State University – Bozeman	Second-largest dome in United States at the time of its construction	
1977–1983	153.0	502.0	Walkup Skydome	Flagstaff, Arizona, United States	Northern Arizona University	Geodesic dome	
1983–1991	162	530	Tacoma Dome	Tacoma, United States	Merit Co.	Geodesic dome	
since 1991	163.4	536	Superior Dome	Marquette, United States	State of Michigan/Northern Michigan University	Geodesic dome	
Cast iron
1811–1881	39.0	128.0	Bourse de commerce (previously the Halle aux blés)	Paris, France	First French Empire	Engineer François Brunet. Architect François-Joseph Bélanger.	
since 1881	46.9	154	Devonshire Royal Hospital	Buxton, United Kingdom		Converted from a horse stables to a hospital. Slate-covered iron frame. Architects John Carr and Robert Rippon Duke.	
Wrought iron
1871–1873			Royal Albert Hall (details earlier)				
1873–1937			Rotunde (details earlier)				
Steel
1902–1955	59.4	195	West Baden Springs Hotel	West Baden, United States	Lee Wiley Sinclair	Steel and glass dome. Architect Harrison Albright.	
1955–1964			Charlotte Coliseum (details earlier)				
1964–1975			Harris County Domed Stadium (details earlier)				
1975–1984			Louisiana Superdome (details earlier)				
1984–1985			Istra dome (details earlier)				
2001–2013			Oita Stadium (details earlier)				
since 2013			Singapore National Stadium (details earlier)				
Reinforced concrete
1913–1930	65.0	213.3	Centennial Hall	Wrocław, Poland		Architect Max Berg	
1930–1957			Wholesale Market Leipzig (details earlier)				
1957–1963	100.6	330	Palazzetto dello Sport	Rome, Italy		Built for the 1960 Summer Olympics. Consulting engineer Pier Luigi Nervi.	
1963–1971			Assembly Hall (details earlier)				
1971–1976	134.1	440	Norfolk Scope	Norfolk, Virginia, United States	City of Norfolk	Consulting engineer Pier Luigi Nervi	
1976–2000*	201	660	King County Stadium	Seattle, United States	King County	Reinforced concrete dome. Demolished on 26 March 2000. Architects NBBJ, John Skilling, and Emil Praeger.	
Glazed
since 2002	70.1	230	Desert Dome	Omaha, United States	Omaha's Henry Doorly Zoo and Aquarium	Glazed geodesic dome. Holds the world's largest indoor desert.	

== By continent ==
List of structures that have been the largest dome on their continent:

=== Europe ===
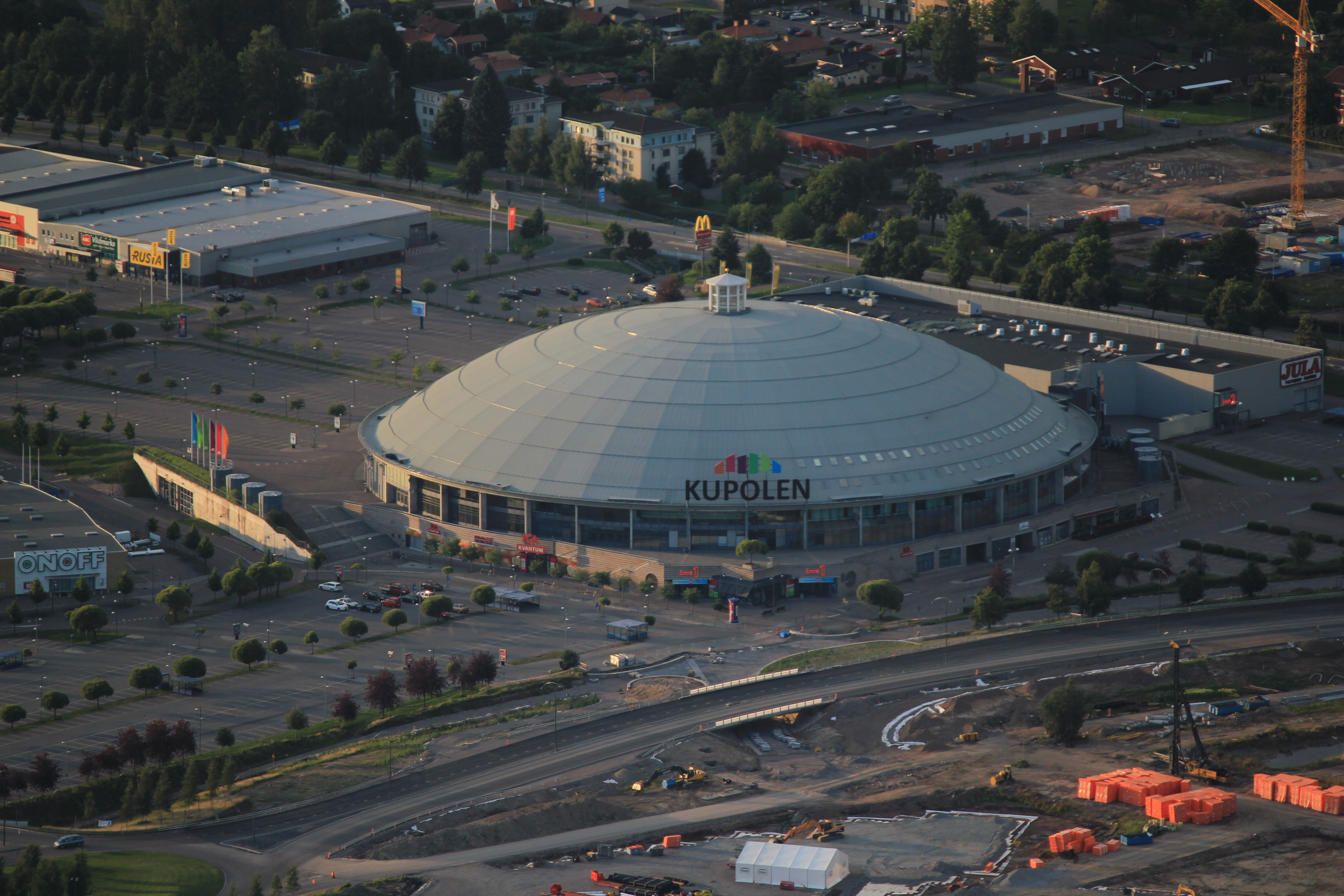
Kupolen (English: Dome) in Borlänge, Sweden, is the largest dome structure in Europe.

Held record	Diameter		Name	Location	Builder	Notes	References
Held record	m	ft	Name	Location	Builder	Notes	References
1250 BC – 1st century BC			Treasury of Atreus (details earlier)				
1st century BC – 19 BC			Temple of Mercury (details earlier)				
19 BC – 109 AD			Baths of Agrippa; Arco della Ciambella (details earlier)				
109–128			Baths of Trajan (details earlier)				
128–1436			Pantheon (details earlier)				
1436–1871			Florence Cathedral (details earlier)				
1871–1873			Royal Albert Hall (details earlier)				
1873–1937			Rotunde (details earlier)				
1937–1957			Wholesale Market Leipzig (details earlier)				
1957–1990			Belgrade Fair – Hall 1 (details earlier)				
since 1990	129	423	Kupolen (English: Dome)	Borlänge, Sweden		Originally an exposition hall with a few stores at ground level, became a three level mall. Architect Coordinator arkitekter.	

=== North America ===
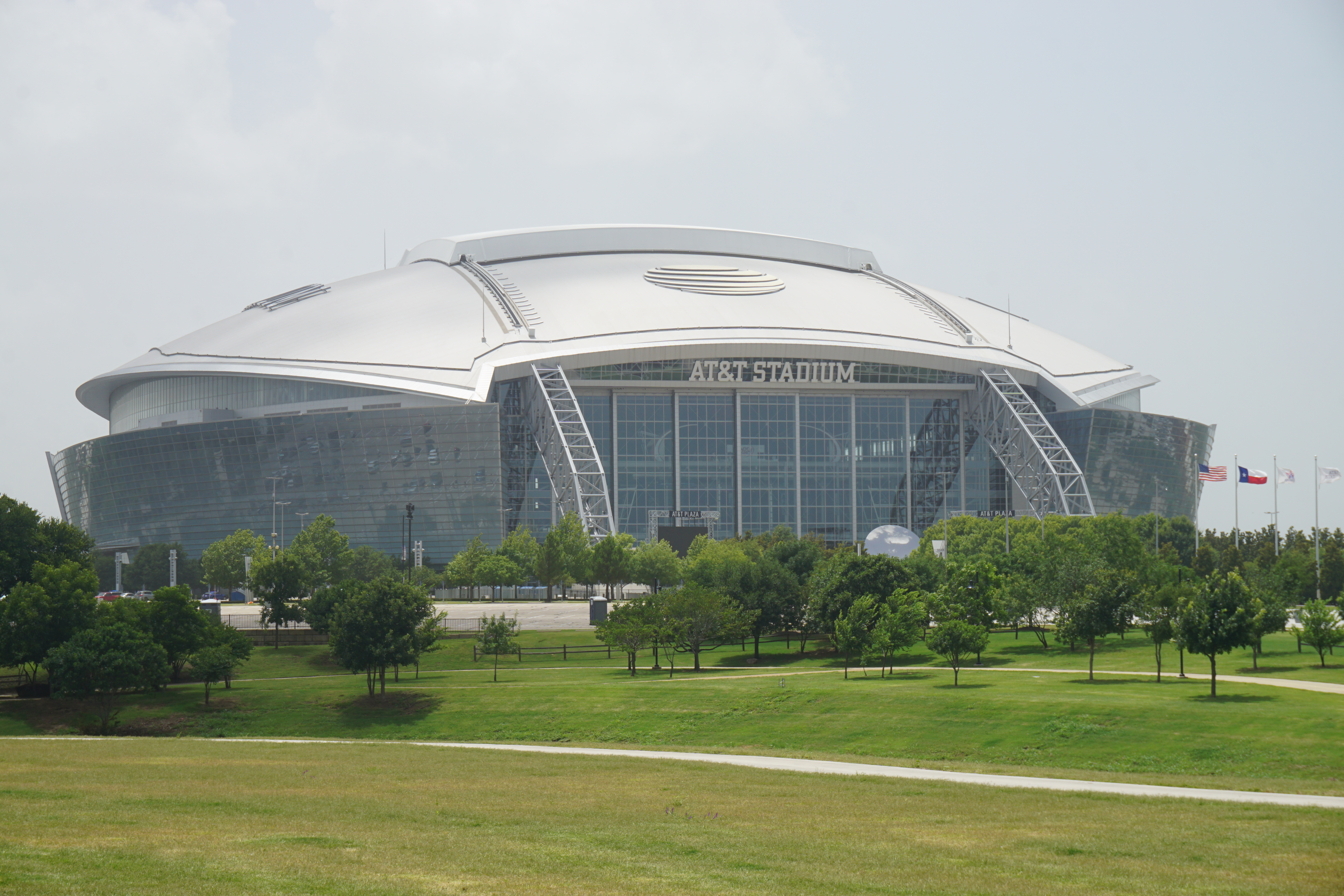
AT&T Stadium, named Cowboys Stadium when constructed, is the largest dome in North America.

Held record	Diameter		Name	Location	Builder	Notes	References
Held record	m	ft	Name	Location	Builder	Notes	References
1864–1867	29	96	United States Capitol	Washington, D.C., United States		Architect Thomas Ustick Walter	
1867–1902	45.7	150	Salt Lake Tabernacle	Salt Lake City, United States		Largely built without nails. Architect Henry Grow.	
1902–1955			West Baden Springs Hotel (details earlier)				
1955–1963			Charlotte Coliseum (details earlier)				
1963–1964			Assembly Hall (details earlier)				
1964–1975			Harris County Domed Stadium (details earlier)				
1975–2009			Louisiana Superdome (details earlier)				
since 2009	230	755	Cowboys Stadium (Note: No reliable figures available)	Arlington, United States	HKS, Inc.	Diameter is estimated. Retractable structural steel roof (14,100 tons of structural steel).	

=== South America ===
Held record	Diameter		Name	Location	Builder	Notes	References
Held record	m	ft	Name	Location	Builder	Notes	References
			Palace of the Argentine National Congress	Buenos Aires, Argentina	Government of Argentina	Bronze-plated dome. Architect Vittorio Meano.	
1960	38	120	Palace of the Brazilian National Congress	Brasília, Brazil	Government of Brazil	Architect Oscar Niemeyer	

=== Asia ===
Held record	Diameter		Name	Location	Builder	Notes	References
Held record	m	ft	Name	Location	Builder	Notes	References
2nd century – 150			Red Basilica (details earlier)				
150–1312			Sanctuary of Asclepius; Temple of Asclepius (details earlier)				
1312–1659	24.6	80.71	Dome of Soltaniyeh	Soltaniyeh, Iran		Persian architects were building double shell domes at the start of the 5th century, but the Dome of Soltaniyeh is the earliest such architecture extant, dating to 1312, over 100 years before Brunelleschi used the same technique to build the dome of Florence Cathedral. This makes the Dome of Soltaniyeh the earliest existing double shell dome. The Florence Cathedral's dome has octagonal supporting walls, like the Dome of Soltaniyeh. The Dome of Soltaniyeh is the third largest brick dome in the world (after Florence Cathedral and Hagia Sophia). Hagia Sophia is older than the Dome of Soltaniyeh, but the Hagia Sophia is a single shell brick dome.	
1659–1937	37.92	120	Gol Gumbaz	Bijapur, India	Sultanate of Bijapur	Mausoleum of Muhammad Adil Shah II (1627 – 1657) of the Sultanate of Bijapur	
1937–1944	45	150	Phnom Penh Central Market	Phnom Penh, Cambodia		Reinforced concrete. Engineer Wladimir Kandaouroff. Architects Jean Desbois and Louis Chauchon.	
1944–1960	60	200	Novosibirsk Opera and Ballet Theatre	Novosibirsk, Russia		Reinforced concrete	
1960–2001	108	354	Araneta Coliseum	Quezon City, Philippines	J. Amado Araneta	Also known as the Big Dome. Opened as the world's biggest indoor venue in 1960. Architect Dominador Lugtu.	
2001–2013			Oita Stadium (details earlier)				
since 2013			Singapore National Stadium (details earlier)				

=== Africa ===
Held record	Diameter		Name	Location	Builder	Notes	References
Held record	m	ft	Name	Location	Builder	Notes	References
1988–1997	90	295.28	Basilica of Our Lady of Peace	Yamoussoukro, Ivory Coast	Dumez	Modeled after the St. Peter's Basilica in Rome. World's tallest dome.	
since 1997	140.0	459.32	MTN Sundome	Johannesburg, South Africa		Sports arena	

=== Australia ===
Held record	Diameter		Name	Location	Builder	Notes	References
Held record	m	ft	Name	Location	Builder	Notes	References
1913–1959	34.75	114.01	State Library Victoria	Melbourne, Australia		Designed by Norman G. Peebles	
1959–1988	47.4	155.51	The Shine Dome	Canberra, Australia		Designed by Sir Roy Grounds	
since 1988	133.0	436.35	Burswood Dome	Perth, Australia		Designed by James Wilkinson	

== Other famous large domes ==
List of famous large domes that have never held any of the size records:

Completion date	Diameter		Name	Location	Builder	Notes	References
Completion date	m	ft	Name	Location	Builder	Notes	References
c. 64	13.48	44.2	Domus Aurea	Rome, Italy	Roman Empire	First dome with a polygonal ground plan (octagon)	
c. 640	11.2	37	Mastara Church	Mastara, Armenia	Sasanian Armenia	Largest intact dome in Armenia	
1227	16.9 × 21.0	55.4 × 68.9	St. Gereon's Basilica	Cologne, Germany		Elliptical dome. Largest dome to be constructed in the Occident in the years between the construction of Hagia Sophia's dome in 563 and the completion of Florence Cathedral in 1436.	
1405	18.2	60	Mausoleum of Khoja Ahmed Yasavi	Turkistan, Kazakhstan	Timur	Double dome	
1557	27.2	89	Süleymaniye Mosque	Istanbul, Turkey	Ottoman Empire	Architect Mimar Sinan	
1575	31.25	102.5	Selimiye Mosque	Edirne, Turkey	Ottoman Empire	Architect Mimar Sinan	
1626	42.3	139	St. Peter's Basilica	Rome, Italy	Holy See	World's tallest dome until 1990. Tallest dome interior (including lantern). Two layer dome. Architect Michelangelo.	
1641	18	58	Taj Mahal	Agra, India	Mughal Empire	Double dome	
1710	31.1	102	St Paul's Cathedral	London, United Kingdom	Christopher Wren	Double dome. The two domes are separated by a cone over the top of the inner which helps support the outer. Height of dome: 225 ft (69 m).	
1732	79.07 × 118.9	24.10 × 36.25	Sanctuary of Vicoforte	Vicoforte, Italy	House of Savoy	Largest elliptical dome in the world. Height of dome: 16 m (52 ft). Architects Ascanio Vitozzi and Francesco Gallo.	
1871	39.6	130	Mosta Dome	Mosta, Malta		Third-largest unsupported dome in the world. Architect Giorgio Grognet de Vassé.	
1894	31	100	Frederik's Church	Copenhagen, Denmark	Frederick V	Built from 1749 to 1894 by three different architects, with no construction done from 1770 to 1877	
1904	15	50	Rhode Island State House	Providence, United States		Third-largest unsupported marble dome in the world.	
1912	18	59	Alexander Nevsky Cathedral	Sofia, Bulgaria	Bulgarian people	Groundbreaking: 3 March 1882. Completed: 1904 – 1912. Consecrated: 1924. Has gold-plated domes. Believed to be among the 10 largest Eastern Orthodox church buildings, and the largest completed Orthodox cathedral located in Southeast Europe.	
1944	61.0	200.1	La Coupole; V-2 rocket bunker	Wizernes, France	Nazi Germany	Reinforced concrete dome. 5 metres (16 ft) thick.	
1952	27	89	Rotunda of Xewkija	Xewkija, Malta		Height: 75 m (246 ft). Weight: 45,000 t (44,000 long tons; 50,000 short tons). Circumference: 85 m (279 ft). Architect Joseph D'Amato.	
1988	51.8	170	Sultan Salahuddin Abdul Aziz Mosque	Shah Alam, Malaysia		Largest mosque in Malaysia. Second largest mosque in South East Asia. Also known as Blue Mosque. Can accommodate up to 16,000 worshippers.	
1992	192 × 240	630 × 787	Georgia Dome	Atlanta, United States	Brasfield & Gorrie	Elliptical tensegrity structure. Demolished on 20 November 2017.	
2005	21.3	70	Long Island Green Dome	Baiting Hollow, United States	Kevin Michael Shea	Largest residential wood geodesic dome in North America. Serves as a home and advocate of sustainable living. Picture.	
2009	78	256	Medgidia clinker storage facility	Medgidia, Romania			
2014	179 × 227	587 × 745	Philippine Arena	Bocaue, Philippines	Iglesia ni Cristo	Elliptical dome. Dome with the largest indoor arena by capacity in the world.	

== See also ==
- Lists of domes
- List of tallest domes
- List of Roman domes

== Sources ==
- Rasch, Jürgen (1985). "Die Kuppel in der römischen Architektur. Entwicklung, Formgebung, Konstruktion". Architectura. 15: 117 –&#32, 139.
