= Roman architectural revolution =

Concrete revolution

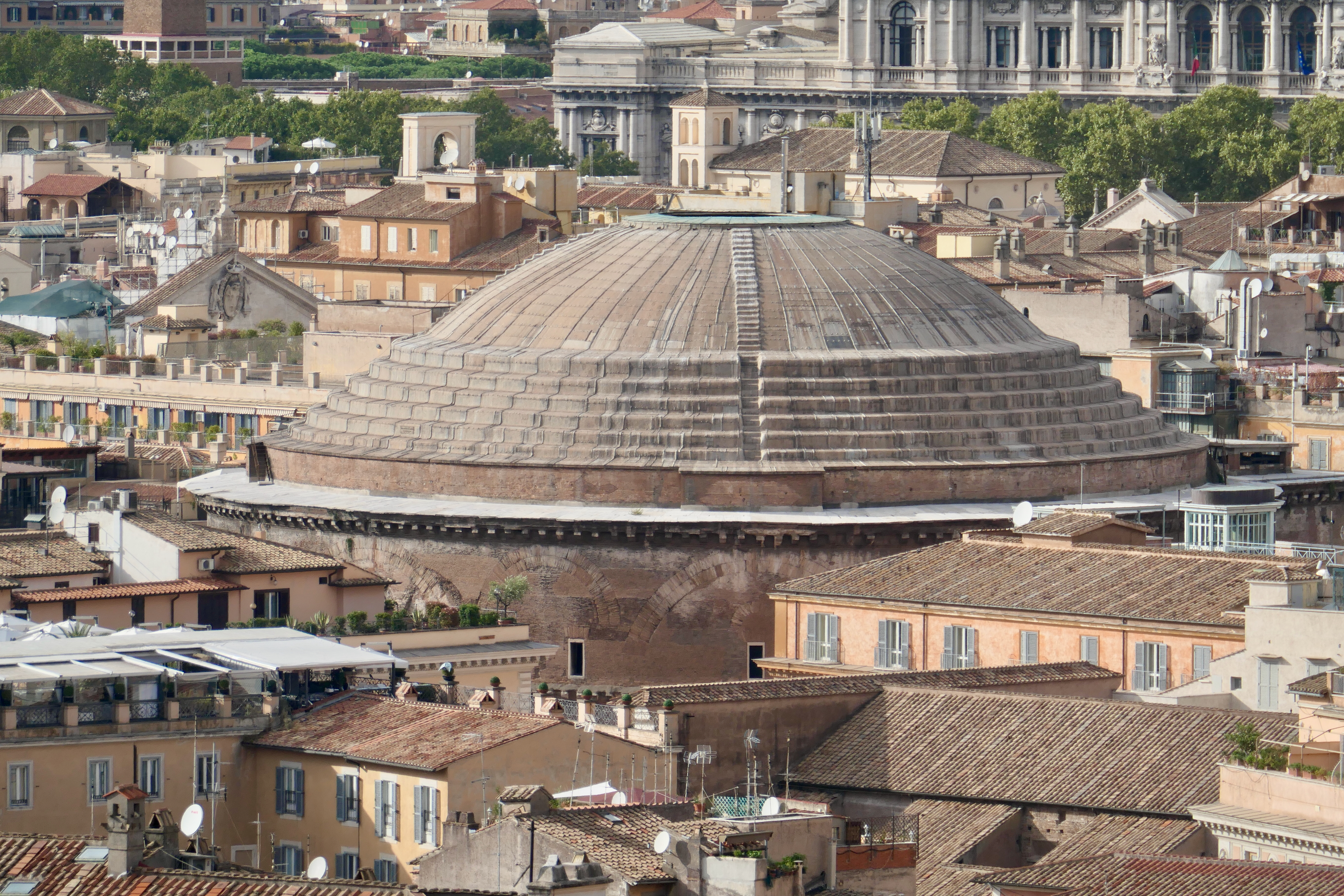
The Roman Pantheon had the largest dome in the world for more than a millennium and is the largest unreinforced solid concrete dome to this day

The Roman architectural revolution, also known as the concrete revolution, is the name sometimes given to the widespread use in Roman architecture of the previously little-used architectural forms of the arch, vault, and dome. For the first time in Europe, possibly in the world, the potential of these elements was fully appreciated and exploited in the construction of a wide range of civil engineering structures, public buildings, and military facilities. Throughout the Roman Empire, from Syria to Scotland, engineers erected structures using semicircular arches. The first use of arches was for civic structures, like drains and city gates. Later the arches were utilized for major civic buildings, bridges and aqueducts, with the outstanding 1st century AD examples provided by the Colosseum, Pont Du Gard, and the aqueduct of Segovia. The introduction of the ceremonial triumphal arch dates back to Roman Republic, although the best examples are from the imperial times (Arch of Augustus at Susa, Arch of Titus).

A crucial factor in this development that saw a trend to monumental architecture was the invention of Roman concrete (also called opus caementicium), which led to the liberation of the shape from the dictate of the traditional materials of stone and brick.

For the first time in recorded history we find evidence of an interest in the shapes of the space contained strong enough to outweigh the functional logic of the masonry masses that contained it. There was nothing new in the employment of curvilinear or polygonal forms, as such...But in so far as such buildings incorporated curvilinear or polygonal rooms and corridors, the shapes of these were determined by the form of the building as a whole, not by any aesthetic principle.

The development of Roman architecture, however, did not remain limited to these new forms and materials. An unrelated process of architectural innovation continued unabated, which, although less conspicuous, proved their usefulness for solving structural problems and found their way permanently into Western architecture, such as the lintel arch, the independent corbel, and the metal-tie.

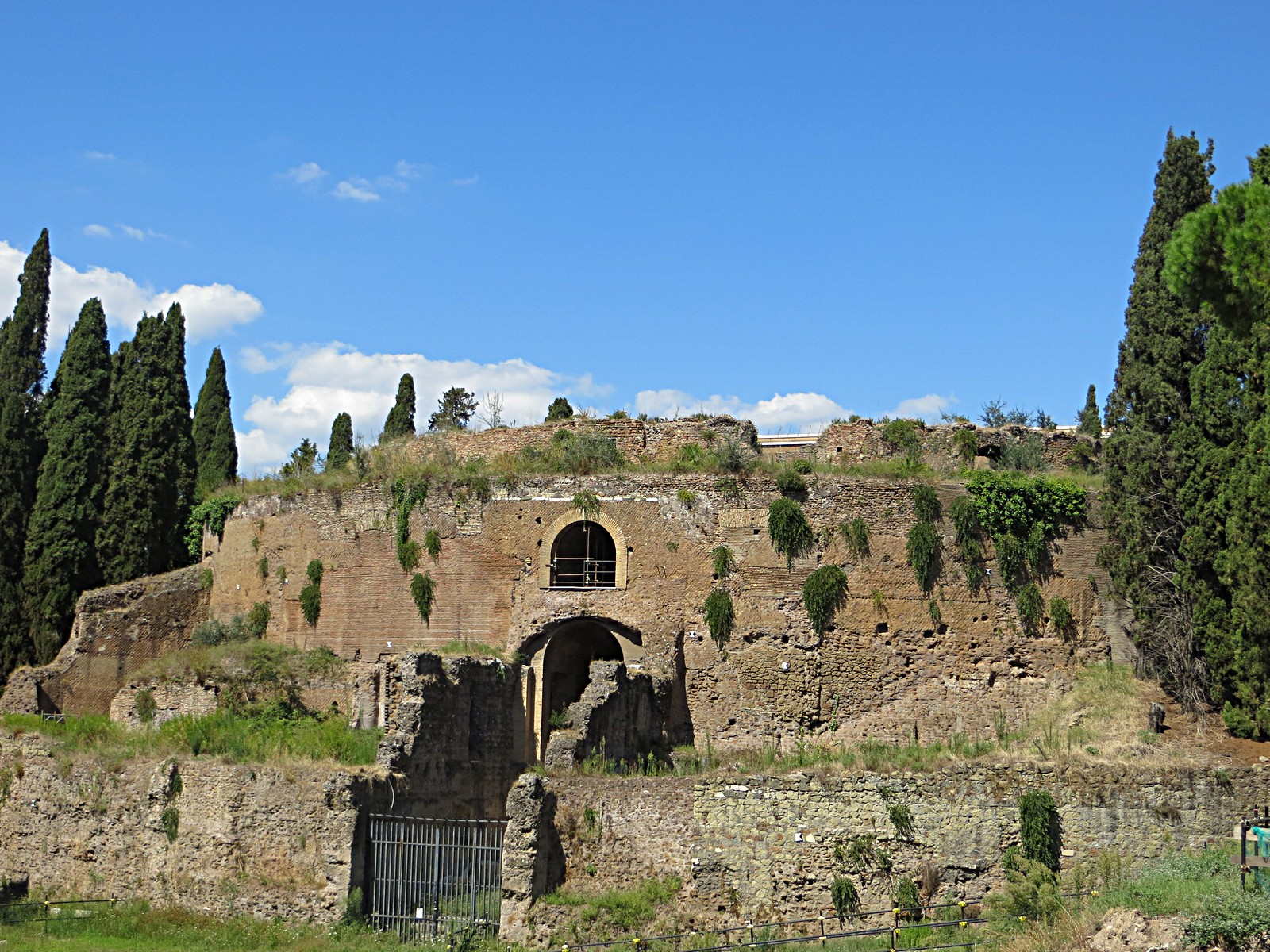
The Mausoleum of Augustus in Rome

During the Age of Augustus, almost the entire city of Rome was rebuilt causing an influx of craftsman and architects from all across Europe. Emperor Augustus aimed to develop new ideas in the construction of his buildings that would forever defy the limits that were ever thought possible. The Mausoleum in Campus Martius was one of the major monuments built by Augustus during his reign that was made almost entirely of concrete using updated construction techniques. The concrete is used in concentric rings that support the structure of the building like walls. The Theatre of Marcellus was another concrete triumph completed during the Age of Augustus, dedicated to the nephew of the emperor. The brick-faced concrete structure construction started under Julius Caesar but was completed under Augustus. It was this building that shows the integration of new concrete building techniques of Augustus's architects as opposed to those of Caesar. The Theatre of Marcellus uses a variety of materials that aid in the growth of the concrete revolution using readily available volcanic stones such as Tuscolo tuff and Tufo Lionato as aggregates in pozzolanic concretes.

These new recipes for concrete provided durability to walls and barrelled vaults as well as a unique aesthetic appeal. The integrated stone and masonry design illustrated a refinement that came with the concrete revolution as a result of the new techniques and styles developed under Augustus. The craftsmanship of the Theatre Marcellus demonstrated a skilled employment as well as rigorous technical supervision.

The revolution reached its apogee in the architecture of Hadrian who instigated a burst of enormous inventiveness in many buildings, such as Hadrian's Villa, the Pantheon, Rome, the so-called temples and the villa of Pisoni at Baiae. These buildings are considered masterpieces of architecture, making use of striking curved shapes enabled by extensive use of concrete. They were ingenious for the complex and distinctive ground plans. His architecture is also noted for other important innovations, including segmented domes sometimes raised on drums which included windows.

== See also ==
- Ancient Roman architecture
- Pozzolanic reaction
- Roman engineering
- Roman technology
