= Silistra Nouă County =

Short-lived county of Romania that existed between 1878 and 1879

- County (Județ)
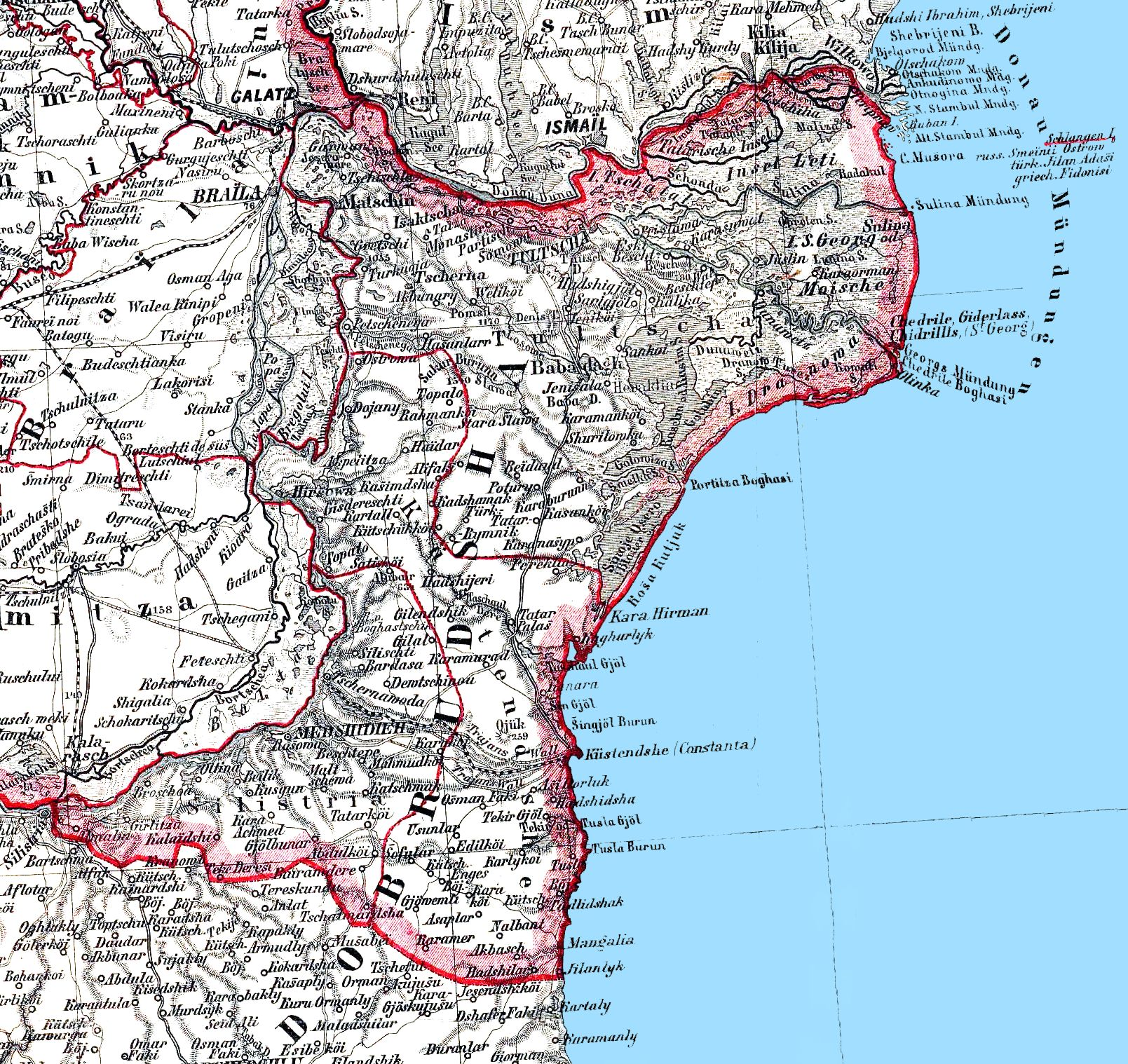
- German map of Northern Dobruja showing Silistra Nouă County in the bottom left corner of the region
- Country: Romania
- Historic region: Northern Dobruja
- Capital city (Reședință de județ): Rasova, Cernavodă and Medgidia
- Established: 13 November 1878
- Ceased to exist: 1 April 1879
- Time zone: UTC+2 (EET)
  - Summer (DST): UTC+3 (EEST)

Silistra Nouă County was a county (județ) of Romania, in Northern Dobruja, with its capital city first at Rasova, later at Cernavodă and finally at Medgidia. It was established on 13 November 1878 and abolished on 1 April 1879. After this, it was integrated into Constanța County, which became the only county in Romanian Dobruja along with Tulcea County. Silistra Nouă County was composed of two plăși ("districts"): Plasa Medgidia (which included Cernavodă and Medgidia) and Plasa Silistra Nouă (which included Rasova). Despite its name, it did not include the city of Silistra.

Earlier, Russia had conquered Northern Dobruja (including the Danube Delta and Snake Island) in 1878 after winning a war together with Romania against the Ottoman Empire. Northern Dobruja was given to Romania by Russia as an "exchange" or "compensation" for the forced annexation by the latter of the Romanian region of Southern Bessarabia. Later, in 1913, Romania was awarded Southern Dobruja after marching into Bulgaria during the Second Balkan War.

== See also ==
- Durostor County
- Former administrative divisions of Romania
