= Medgidia clinker storage facility =

Buildings and structures in Romania

Coordinates: 44°14′43″N 28°17′59″E

Medgidia Clinker Storage Facility is the largest dome-type cement clinker storage facility in the world and one of the largest dome-type structures in Romania. It is operated by CRH and situated at Medgidia. The storage facility, which was completed in 2009, can store 250,000 cubic metres of clinker.
