= Medgidia =

- Municipality
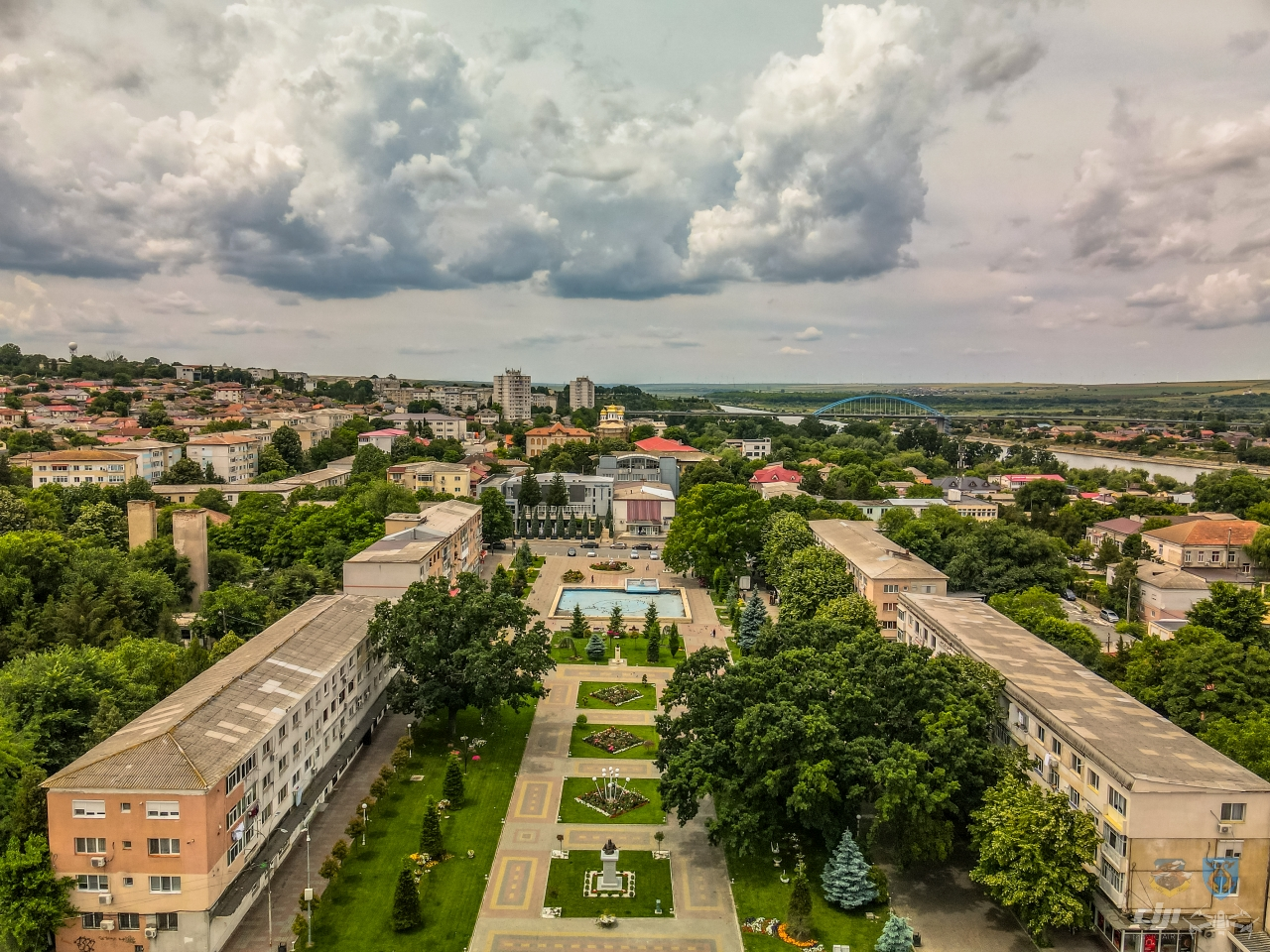
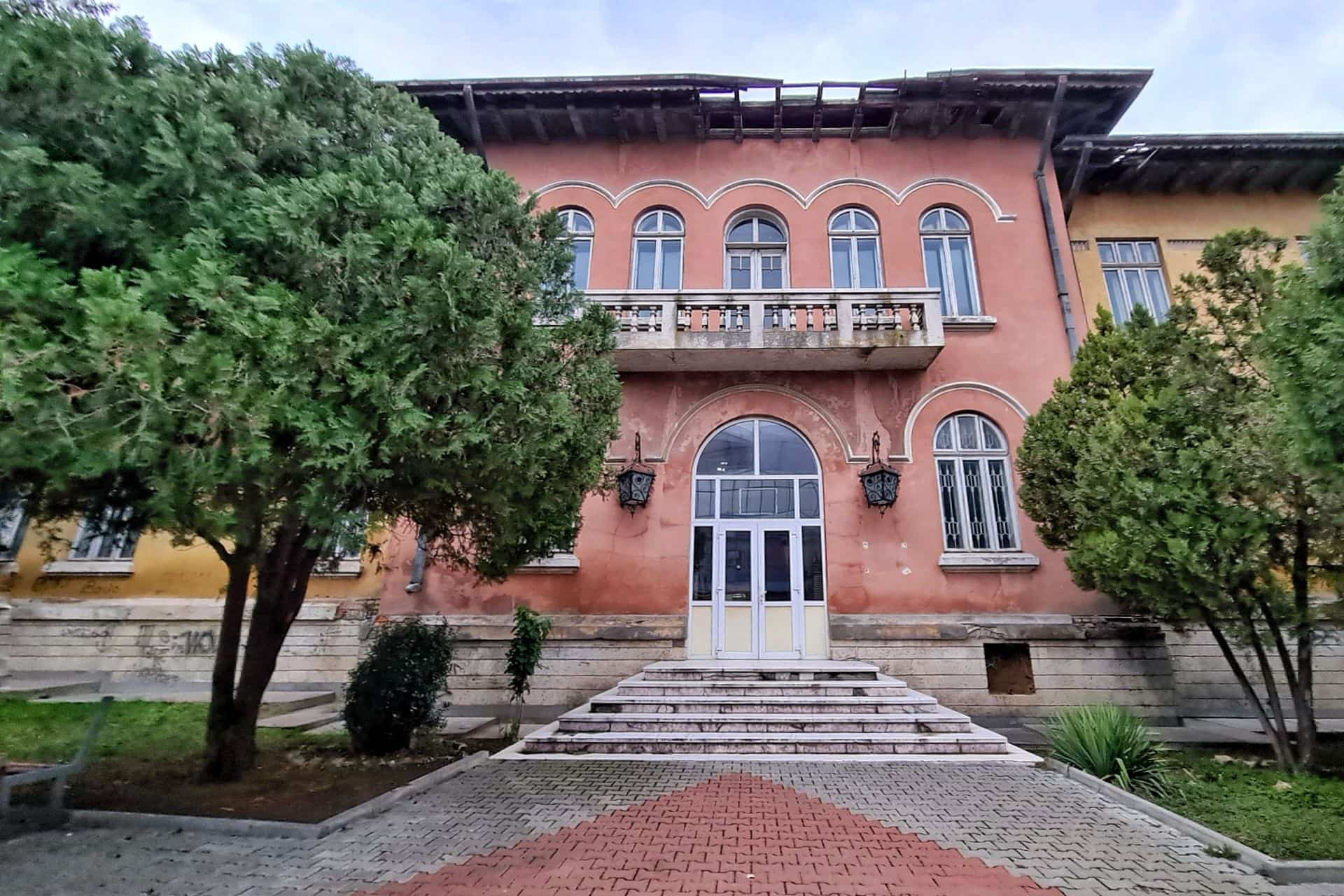
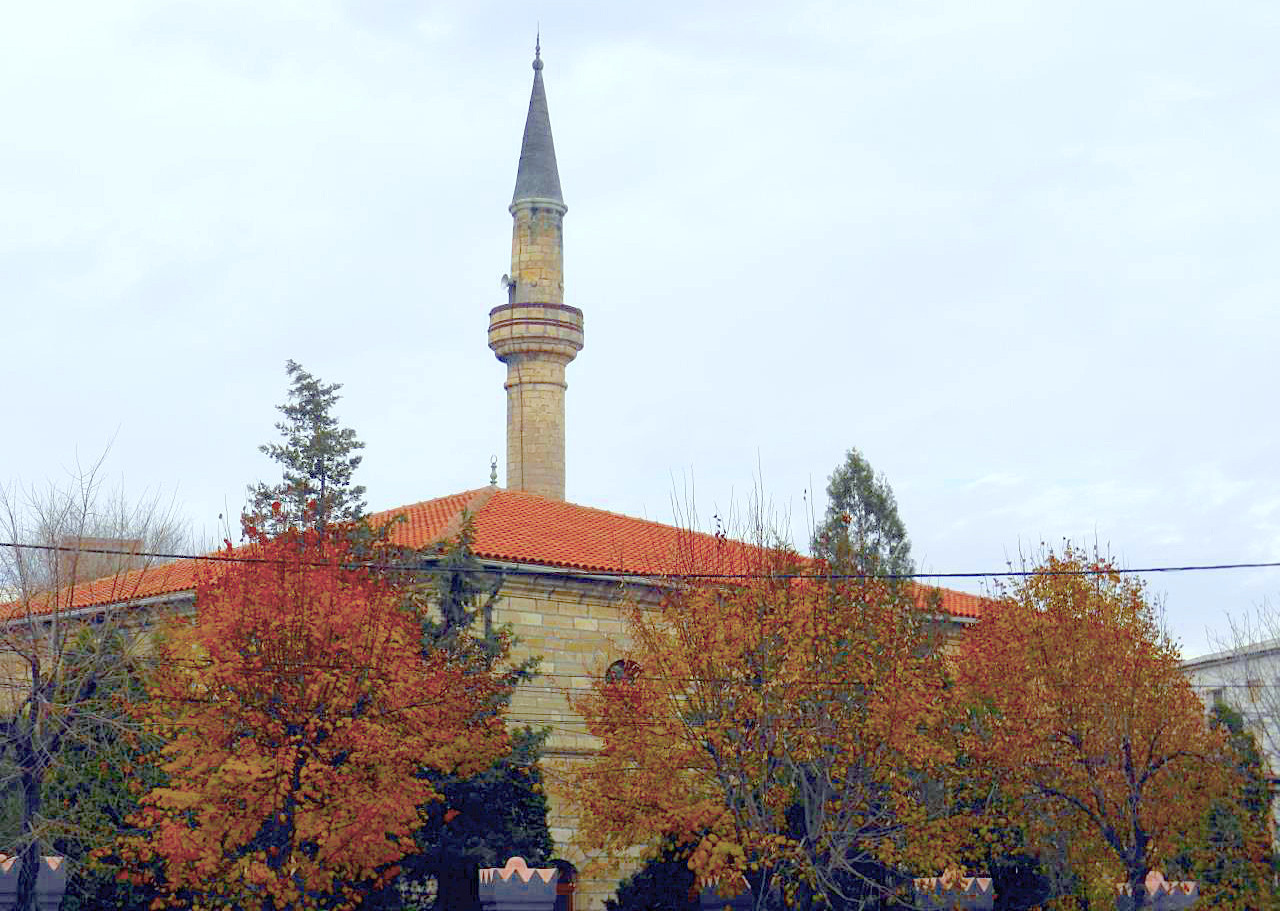
- Decebal Plaza Lucian Grigorescu Art Museum Abdul Medgid Mosque

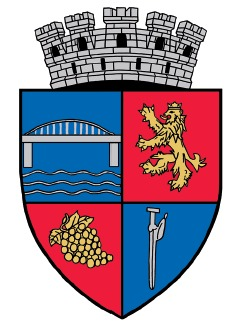
- Coat of arms

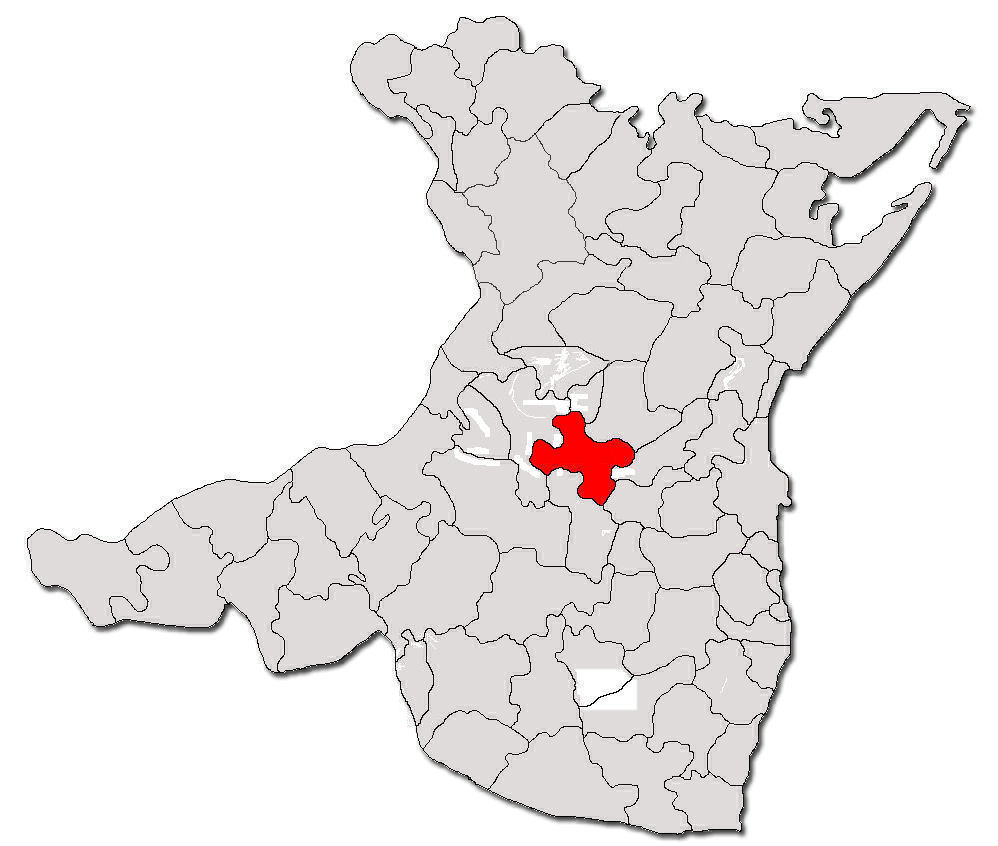
- Location in Constanța County

- Location in Romania
- Coordinates: 44°15′01″N 28°15′41″E
- Country: Romania
- County: Constanța
- Subdivisions: Remus Opreanu, Valea Dacilor

Government
  - Mayor (2024–2028): Valentin Vrabie (PNL)
- Area: 90.17 km^{2} (34.81 sq mi)
- Elevation: 75 m (246 ft)
- Population (2021-12-01): 34,612
  - Density: 383.9/km^{2} (994.2/sq mi)
- Time zone: UTC+02:00 (EET)
  - Summer (DST): UTC+03:00 (EEST)
- Postal code: 905600
- Area code: (+40) 02 41
- Vehicle reg.: CT
- Website: primaria-medgidia.ro

Medgidia (Romanian pronunciation: [med͡ʒiˈdi.a] or [med.d͡ʒiˈdi.a]; historical Turkish names: Karasu or Carasu, Mecidiye or Megidie) is a city in Constanța County, Northern Dobruja, south-eastern Romania.

== History ==
Archaeological findings show that Dobruja was inhabited since the Neolithic period. Starting with 46 BC the region was administered by the Roman Empire. A castrum was built in the Carasu Valley, becoming the cradle of the settlement.

In 1417, the Turks invaded Dobruja. From the 15th century onwards, the region started to be colonized with a Muslim population. The settlement named "Karasu" (Turkish for "Black Water") was mentioned on the map of Iehuda ben Zara in 1497, in the notes of Paolo Giorgio (1590) and Evliya Çelebi (1653).

Modern Medgidia was built by the Ottoman administration on the place of the old Karasu beginning with 1856. It was built as a planned city to accommodate refugees from the Crimean War and to serve as an economic hub for the central zone of Dobruja. The town was named in honour of the sultan Abdülmecid I, the Ottoman sovereign of the period.

After the Russo-Turkish War of 1877–1878, Northern Dobruja became part of Romania. Medgidia was the last capital of Silistra Nouă County (1878–1879) before it was merged into Constanța County.

== Geography ==
Medgidia is located between the Danube and the Black Sea, 39 km (24 mi) away from Constanța. The city is crossed by the Danube–Black Sea Canal west to east; the river Medgidia discharges into the Canal in Remus Opreanu village.

The general aspect of the relief is that of a low plateau with a limestone structure, covered with thick deposits of loess. The natural resources in the area consist of limestone deposits and kaolin sand. The limestone structure of the earth permits a natural filtering of the groundwater.

== Climate ==
Medgidia features a semi-arid temperate continental climate, determined by its inland location within the Southern Dobruja Plateau and central Constanța County. The local climate exhibits a pronounced continentality, characterized by wide annual temperature variations and highly variable precipitation patterns. Due to low cloud cover and high solar radiation, the municipality experiences high rates of evapotranspiration, which frequently outstrip precipitation and result in a net moisture deficit. Extreme temperatures range from 41.1 °C in July 2007 to -23.0 °C in February 1954.

Climate data for Medgidia (elevation 70m, 2014–2026 normals, extremes 1965–present)
Month	Jan	Feb	Mar	Apr	May	Jun	Jul	Aug	Sep	Oct	Nov	Dec	Year
Record high °C (°F)	19.3 (66.7)	26.0 (78.8)	31.2 (88.2)	32.8 (91.0)	34.2 (93.6)	37.4 (99.3)	41.1 (106.0)	40.1 (104.2)	34.8 (94.6)	32.7 (90.9)	27.5 (81.5)	20.3 (68.5)	41.1 (106.0)
Mean daily maximum °C (°F)	5.5 (41.9)	7.7 (45.9)	12.3 (54.1)	17.4 (63.3)	22.6 (72.7)	28.3 (82.9)	31.3 (88.3)	31.3 (88.3)	26.2 (79.2)	18.9 (66.0)	12.3 (54.1)	7.3 (45.1)	18.4 (65.2)
Daily mean °C (°F)	1.9 (35.4)	3.9 (39.0)	7.4 (45.3)	11.7 (53.1)	16.7 (62.1)	22.1 (71.8)	24.7 (76.5)	24.7 (76.5)	20.2 (68.4)	13.9 (57.0)	8.6 (47.5)	4.1 (39.4)	13.3 (56.0)
Mean daily minimum °C (°F)	−1.6 (29.1)	0.2 (32.4)	2.5 (36.5)	6.0 (42.8)	10.9 (51.6)	16.0 (60.8)	18.1 (64.6)	18.2 (64.8)	14.3 (57.7)	9.0 (48.2)	4.9 (40.8)	0.9 (33.6)	8.3 (46.9)
Record low °C (°F)	−21.0 (−5.8)	−23.0 (−9.4)	−14.8 (5.4)	−6.0 (21.2)	1.4 (34.5)	6.9 (44.4)	10.0 (50.0)	6.6 (43.9)	−1.5 (29.3)	−5.2 (22.6)	−12.7 (9.1)	−16.9 (1.6)	−23.0 (−9.4)
Average precipitation mm (inches)	29.8 (1.17)	22.3 (0.88)	23.8 (0.94)	34.4 (1.35)	38.1 (1.50)	53.9 (2.12)	42.7 (1.68)	15.8 (0.62)	27.9 (1.10)	40.6 (1.60)	48.1 (1.89)	31.9 (1.26)	409.3 (16.11)
Average precipitation days (≥ 1.0 mm)	5.6	4.3	4.5	6.1	6.8	5.8	5.2	2.2	2.9	5.1	5.8	5.7	60
Average snowy days	6.7	4.6	2.1	0.5	0	0	0	0	0	0	1.2	3.3	18.4
Source 1: Meteomanz (2014-2026)
Source 2: Analiza de Predictibilitate A Riscurilor Climatice În Județul Constanța (1965-2005)

Historical population
Year	Pop.	±%
1912	6,252	—
1930	6,466	+3.4%
1948	6,916	+7.0%
1956	17,943	+159.4%
1966	27,981	+55.9%
1977	40,328	+44.1%
1992	46,657	+15.7%
2002	43,867	−6.0%
2011	36,008	−17.9%
2021	39,780	+10.5%
Source: Census data

== Local administration ==
Medgidia became a municipality in 1994.

The town infrastructure is continuously developing and offers the inhabitants 4 high schools, 8 primary schools, 12 nurseries, 4 cultural centers with a hall for cultural activities, 2 show and cinema halls, 3 clubs and 5 libraries, a 30,000-seat stadium, a sports hall, and a swimming pool. Medgidia also houses a 500-bed hospital.

The following villages are administered by the municipality:

- Remus Opreanu (historical name: Alibei-Ceair, Turkish: Alibeyçayır) – renamed after Remus Opreanu, the first Romanian prefect of Constanța County (1878–1881)
- Valea Dacilor (historical name: Endecarachioi, Turkish: Hendek Karaköy or Hendek Kara Kuyusu)

=== Politics ===
The current mayor of Medgidia is Valentin Vrabie (PNL). The Medgidia Municipal Council, elected in the 2024 local government elections, consists of 18 councillors. The National Liberal Party holds 10 seats, the Social Democratic Party holds 5 seats, the Alliance for the Union of Romanians holds 2 seats, and one seat is held by the S.O.S. Romania party.

Party	Seats	Current Council
National Liberal Party (PNL)	10	
Social Democratic Party (PSD)	5	
Alliance for the Union of Romanians (AUR)	2	
S.O.S. Romania (SOS)	1	

== Economy ==
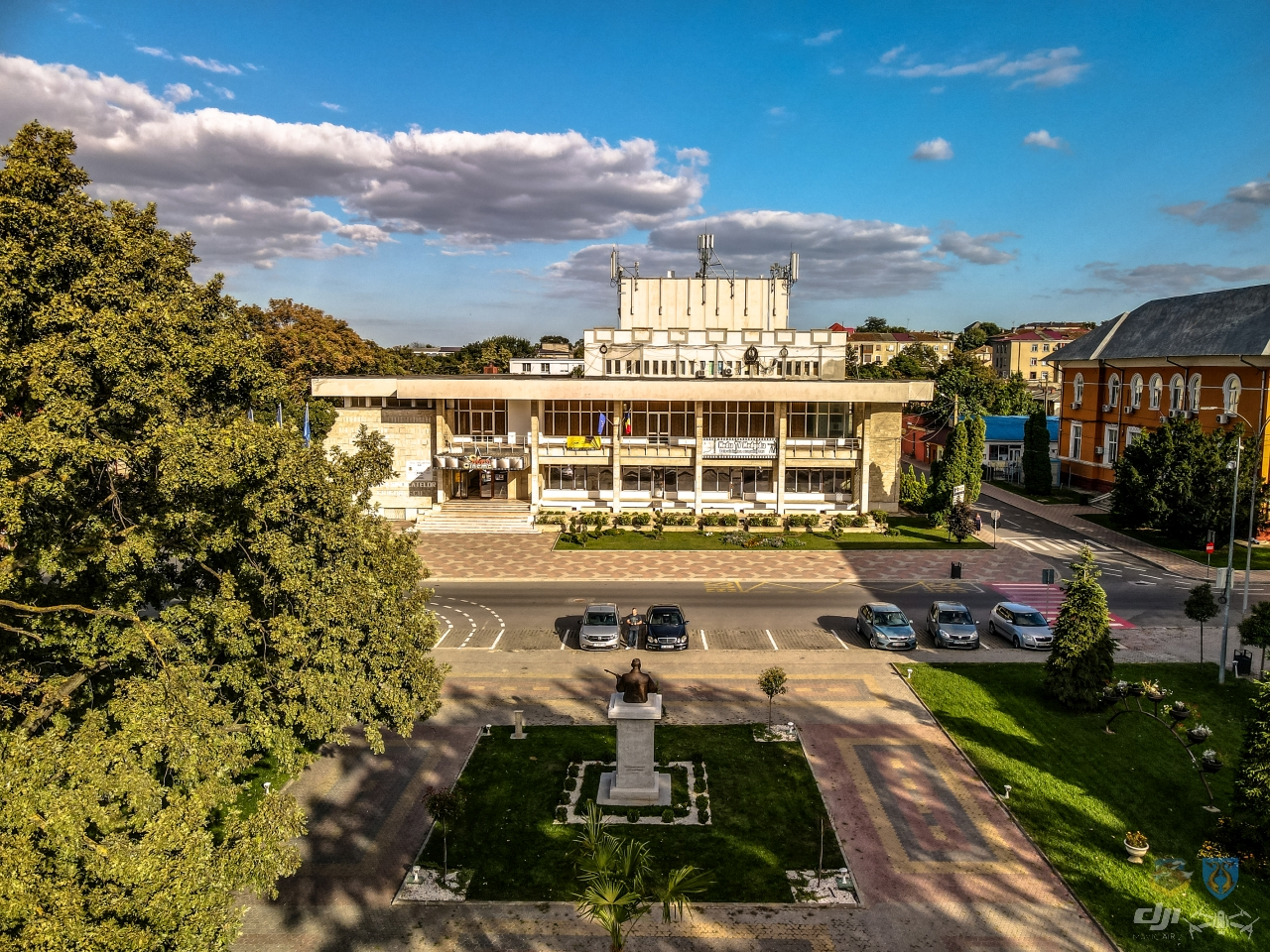
Trade union cultural center

The economic landscape spotlights the existence of a town fully involved in its progress. Out of 1,200 registered enterprises, only 30 are state-owned and 15 are joint ventures.

Beside the agricultural activities (milk-processing, milling, bakery and wine growing), the main industry deals in cement and building materials, agricultural machinery and forging equipment, wood processing and furniture factories.

Medgidia lies in the center of an agricultural area of several tens of millions hectares, with a fertile soil and provided with irrigation systems.

The area offers:

- a rich agricultural tradition and trained specialists
- a road network for the transport of goods
- relatively short transport distances, especially through the port
- access to other Romanian or European regions
- better climate conditions than in other parts of Romania (winter is shorter)
- an outstanding irrigation potential

The Medgidia clinker storage facility was completed in 2009 and is the world's largest dome-type cement clinker storage facility.

The Romanian Air Force operates a WSR-98D radar station in Medgidia. The facility is officially designated and operated as a civilian radar station by the National Meteorological Administration, however the data is fed into the NATO Integrated Air Defense System as well.

== Transport ==
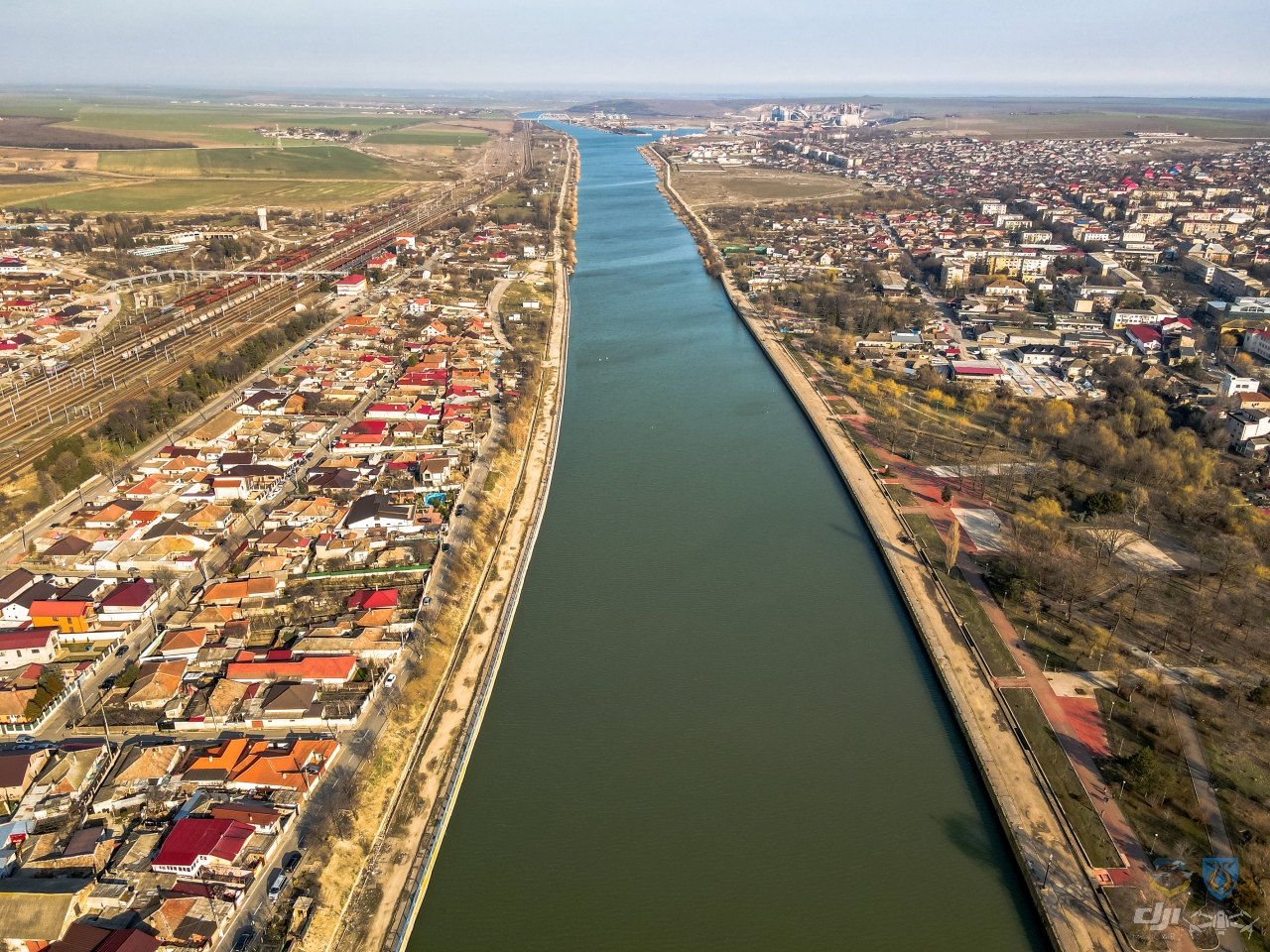
The Danube–Black Sea Canal in Medgidia

The town is a road and rail node and an inland port to the Danube–Black Sea Canal. The Canal crosses the town for about 6 km (3.7 mi) of its length.

The Danube–Black Sea Canal has a capacity of 11.2 million tons/year and can admit ships of 5,000 tonnes deadweight (DWT). Provided with road and rail links, the harbor offers storage facilities and cranes able to lift up to 16-ton weights. Beside a SNCFR marshaling yard, along the Canal there is a Free Trade Area in course of being finalized.

The A2 highway from Bucharest to Constanța, partially financed by the European Union, bypasses the town, allowing the development of associated services (hotels, petrol stations and a parking yard for trucks) in the area.

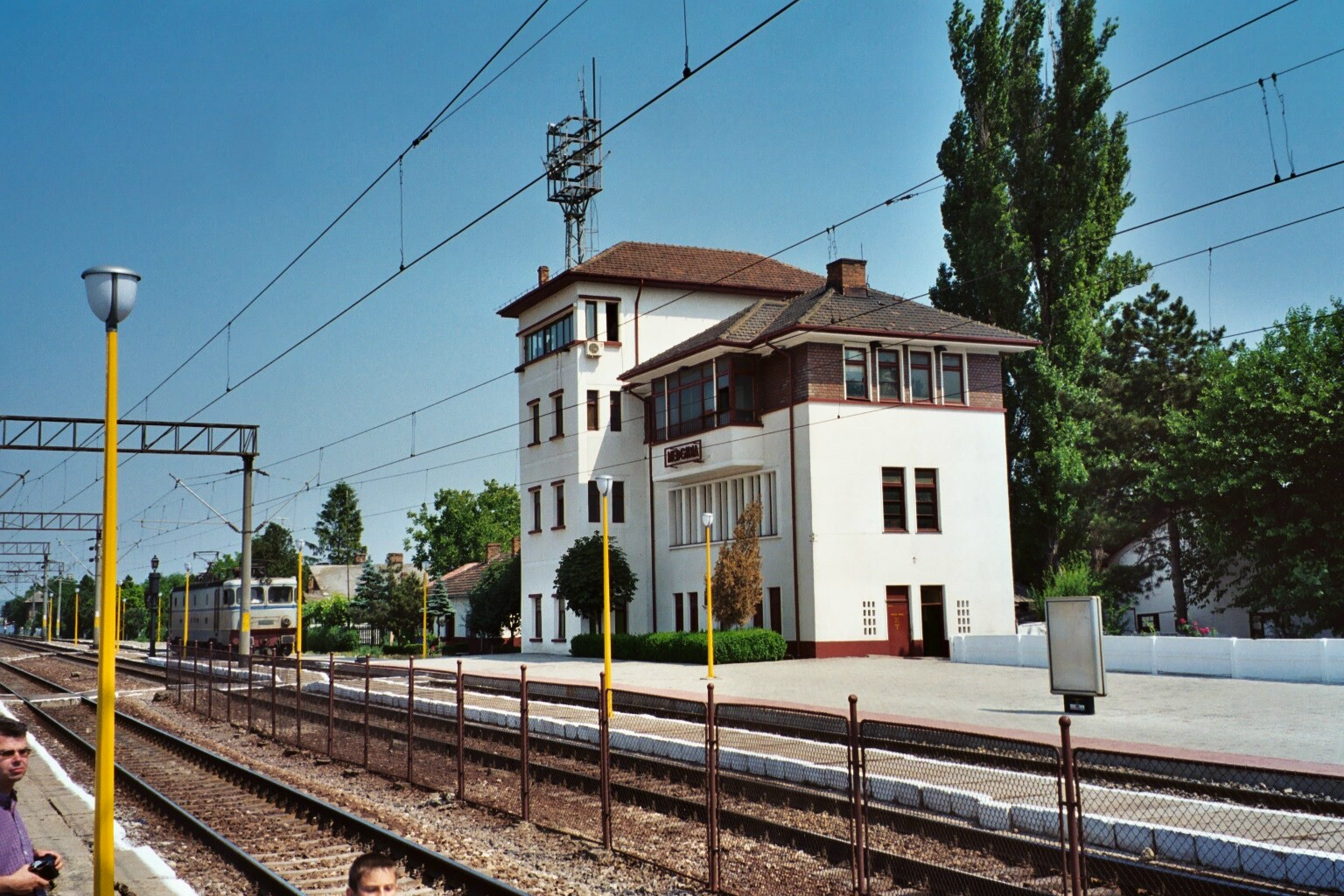
Medgidia railway station

Also, the Medgidia train station is an important node on the CNCFR Main Line 800. The station provides rail service to several towns and cities, including Constanța (35 km), Tulcea (144 km), and București Nord (199 km).

== Landmarks ==
=== The Art Museum "Lucian Grigorescu" ===
It was opened in 1964 with exhibitions of Romanian contemporary painting, sculpture, and graphics, signed Lucian Grigorescu, Marius Bunescu, Ion Jalea, and others. The permanent exhibition takes in classic and modern artworks but also works of contemporary art classics, including Lucian Grigorescu, Nicolae Tonitza, Francisc Șirato, Ștefan Dimitrescu, and Iosif Iser. The museum also displays a collection of ceramic artworks.

In 1991 the museum was named after Lucian Grigorescu, a town native, who was deemed as the most Latin among the Romanian painters. The city honors the painter every year on 1 February, the anniversary of his birthday.

Because of low income due to few visitors and high maintenance costs, the museum was closed in 2009.

=== The "Abdul Mejid" Mosque ===
Built in 1860 by the Ottoman Government, the mosque is an historic and architectural monument. It was named after the sultan Abdulmejid I, who reigned between 1839 and 1861.

The mosque is served by an imam and a muezzin. The building respects the traditional form of the Muslim cultural placements, decorated in the interior with oriental ornaments and inscriptions in Arabic.

=== The "Saints Peter and Paul" Orthodox church ===
The church was built in a Roman-Greek style and it was raised with the contribution of the local Christians on the ruins of a Roman castrum.

=== The Serbian Heroes' Monument ===
In 1926, Medgidia commemorated the heroism of the First Serbian Volunteer Division, which fought in Dobruja during World War I as a part of the bloody Romanian theatre, by inaugurating a monument in the group's honor. The completed memorial, featuring an iconic white marble pyramid, was the setting of a ceremony held with the participation of both Romanian and Yugoslavian officials. Wreaths were laid at the base of the monument by members of the Serbian and Romanian royal families.

== Natives ==
- Mihaela Albu (born 1994), volleyball player
- Stelian Carabaș (born 1974), football player
- Alexandru Cicâldău (born 1997), football player
- Titus Corlățean (born 1968), politician and diplomat, former Minister of Justice and of Foreign Affairs
- Tiberiu Curt (born 1975), football player
- Laurențiu Florea (born 1981), football player
- Tahsin Gemil (born 1943), historian, translator, diplomat, and politician
- Lucian Grigorescu (1894–1965), post-impressionist painter
- Emil Hoștină (born 1976), actor
- Marian Lazăr (born 1952), boxer
- Bogdan Mitache (born 1994), football player
- Bănică Oprea (born 1967), football player
- Silviana Sfiringu (born 2004), artistic gymnast

== Sports ==
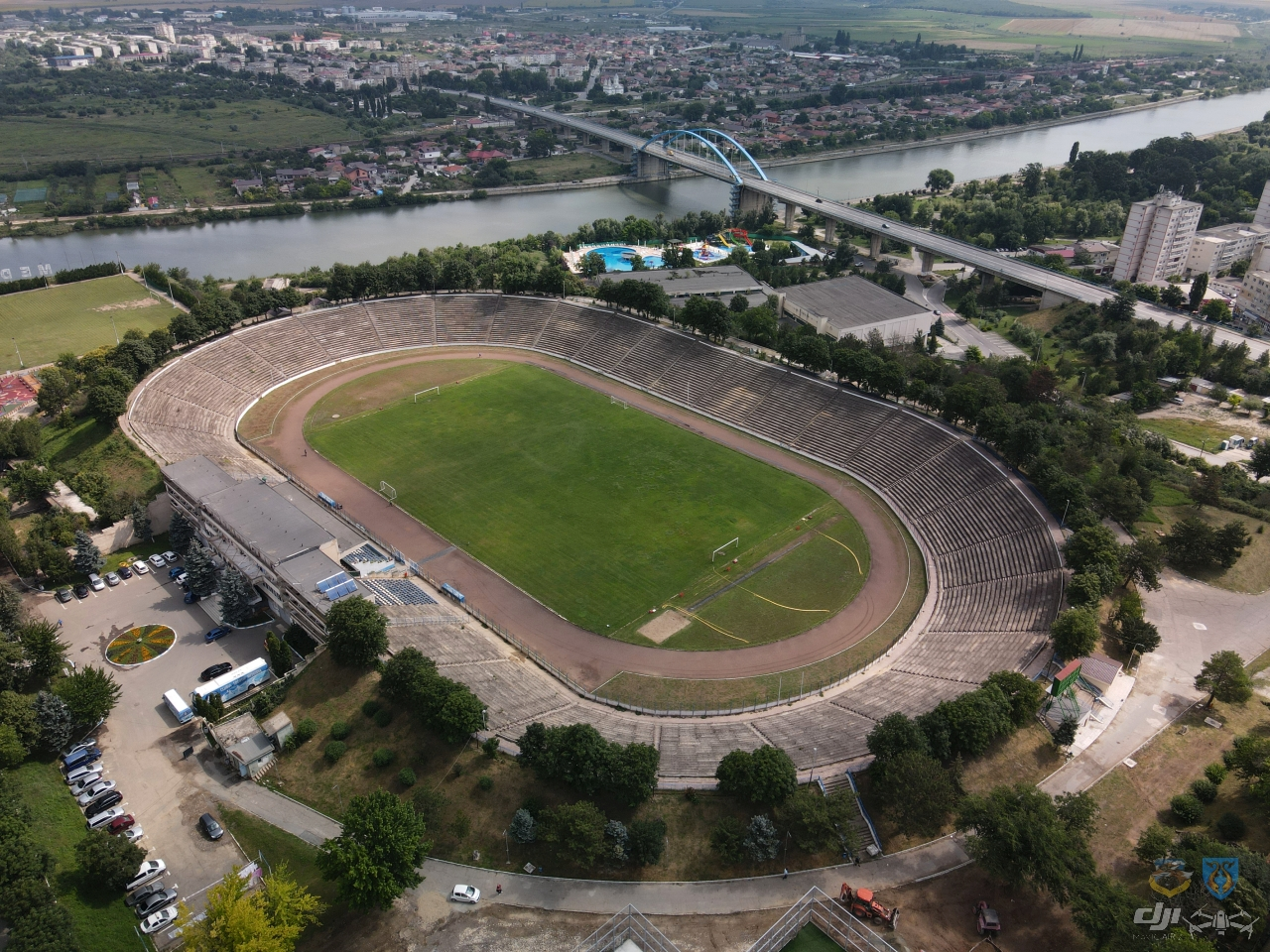
The Iftimie Ilisei Stadium

CS Medgidia is the city's sports club. Its professional football club currently play in the Liga IV. Apart from football, the club also competes in handball, volleyball, wrestling, boxing, arm wrestling, swimming, chess, and rugby. The home ground for the club is Stadionul Iftimie Ilisei; opened in 1978, the stadium holds 32,700 people.

== The Medgidia Festival ==
The festival has been celebrated each year since 1999, at the end of October, and is attended by thousands of locals.

== Media ==
- Graiul Dobrogei (link Graiul Dobrogei), local newspaper
- Alpha Media, local TV channel
- Media TV, local TV channel
- Revista Dobrogeană, multilingual culture and history-themed periodical

== International relations ==
=== Twin towns — Sister cities ===
Medgidia is twinned with:

- Cahul, Moldova
- Favara, Italy
- Zhumadian, China
- Yalova, Turkey
- Mátranovák, Hungary
