= List of domes in France =

This is a list of domes in France.

== Paris ==
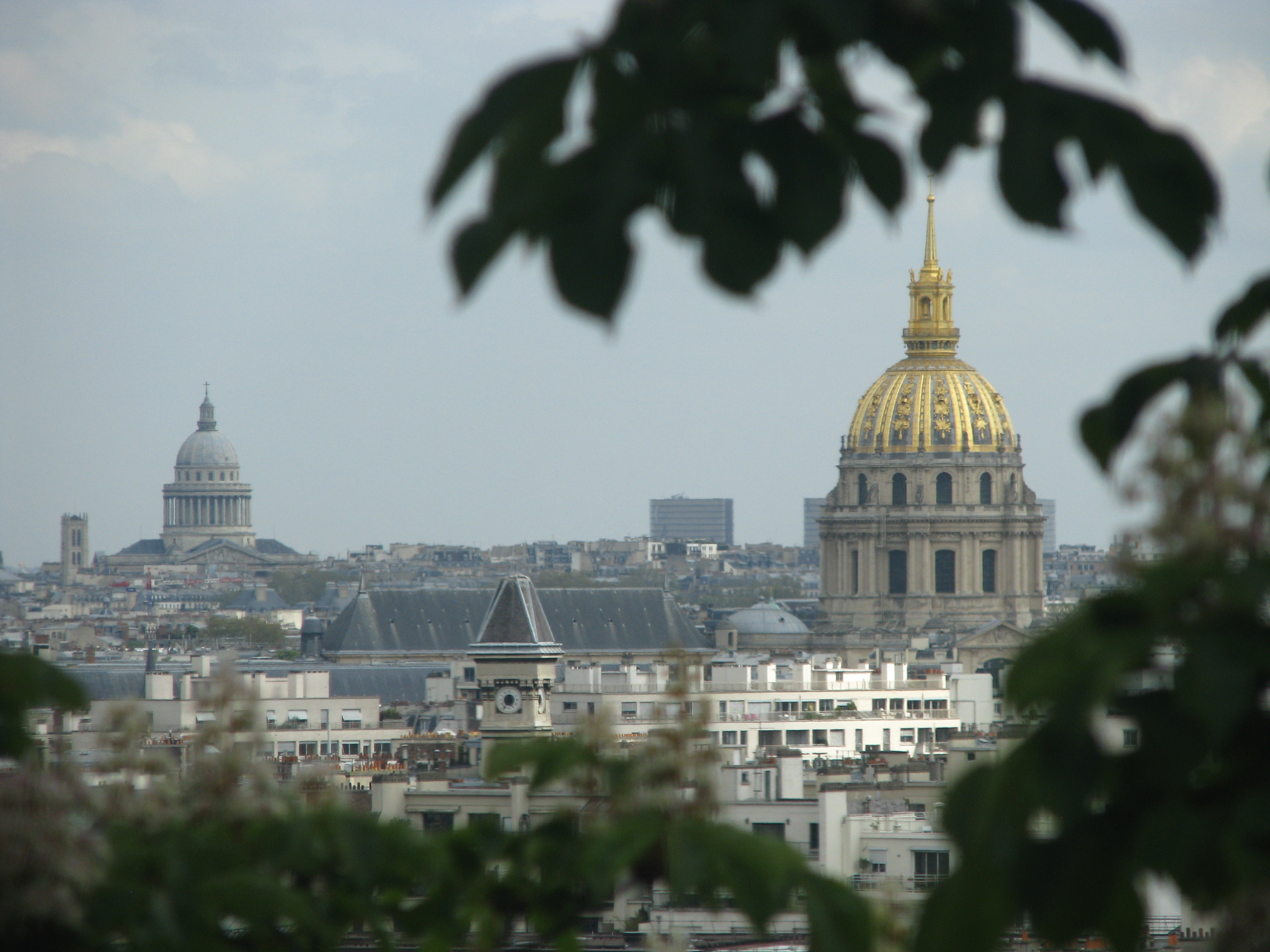
Des Invalides and the Panthéon domes

Name	Diameter	Date Completed	Picture
Panthéon			
Chapel Saint-Louis des Invalides			
Sorbonne			
Basilique du Sacré-Cœur			
Church of the Val-de-Grâce			
Église Saint-Augustin			
Église Saint-Paul-Saint-Louis			
Palais de la Légion d'Honneur			
Église Saint-Sulpice (East side)			
Luxembourg Palace Street Entrance			
Institut de France			
Église Saint-Roch			
Académie Royale de Médecine			
Tribunal de commerce de Paris			
Église du Saint-Esprit		1935	
Église Saint-Joseph-des-Carmes			
Église Notre-Dame-de-l'Assomption			
Bourse de Commerce			
Temple du Marais			
Chapelle Notre Dame de Consolation			
Église Saint-Dominique			
Église Sainte-Jeanne-de-Chantal		1956	
Parc Monceau Rotunda			
Paris Observatory		1891	
Chapelle Expiatoire			
Pitié-Salpêtrière Hospital		1675	
Théâtre du Rond-Point			
Petit Palais			
Palais de la Découverte			
Printemps			
Saint-Nicolas-du-Chardonnet			
Palais Garnier			
Guimet Museum			
Palais-Royal (Escalier d'Honneur)			
Musée Jacquemart-André		1875	
Lycée Henri-IV		1730	
Félix Potin Building			
Chapel of the Soeurs Auxiliatrices du Purgatoire			
Regard de la Lanterne		1613	
La Santé Prison			

=== Cupolas on the Corner of Buildings ===
Name	Diameter	Date Completed	Picture
Boulevard Haussmann and Rue Pasquier			
Gaumont Opéra			
40 Quai Henri-IV			
Bazar de l'Hôtel de Ville			
13 Rue de la Bûcherie			
38 Avenue de l'Opéra			

== Blois ==
Name	Diameter	Date Completed	Picture
Eglise Saint Saturnin			

== Grenoble ==
Name	Diameter	Date Completed	Picture
Coupole dauphinoise			

== Lyon ==
Name	Diameter	Date Completed	Picture
Hôtel-Dieu			

== Melun ==
Name	Diameter	Date Completed	Picture
Vaux-le-Vicomte		1661	

== Nantes ==
Name	Diameter	Date Completed	Picture
Notre-Dame de Bon-Port			

== Nice ==
Name	Diameter	Date Completed	Picture
Nice Observatory			
Hotel Negresco			

== Saumur ==
Name	Diameter	Date Completed	Picture
Église Notre-Dame-des-Ardilliers			

== Strasbourg ==
Name	Diameter	Date Completed	Picture
Strasbourg Cathedral		1880	
Observatory of Strasbourg	9.2 m (30 ft)	1880	
Saint-Pierre-le-Jeune Catholic Church	18.5 m (61 ft)	1893	

== Toulouse ==
Hôpital de La Grave

== Tours ==
Name	Diameter	Date Completed	Picture
Basilique Saint Martin			

== See also ==
- List of Roman domes
