= Cloister vault =

Architectural feature; type of arched roof

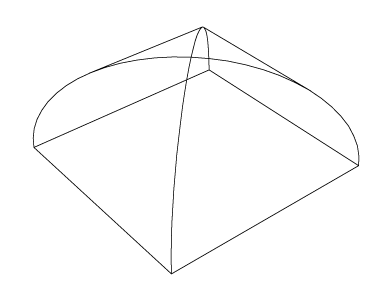
Cloister vault

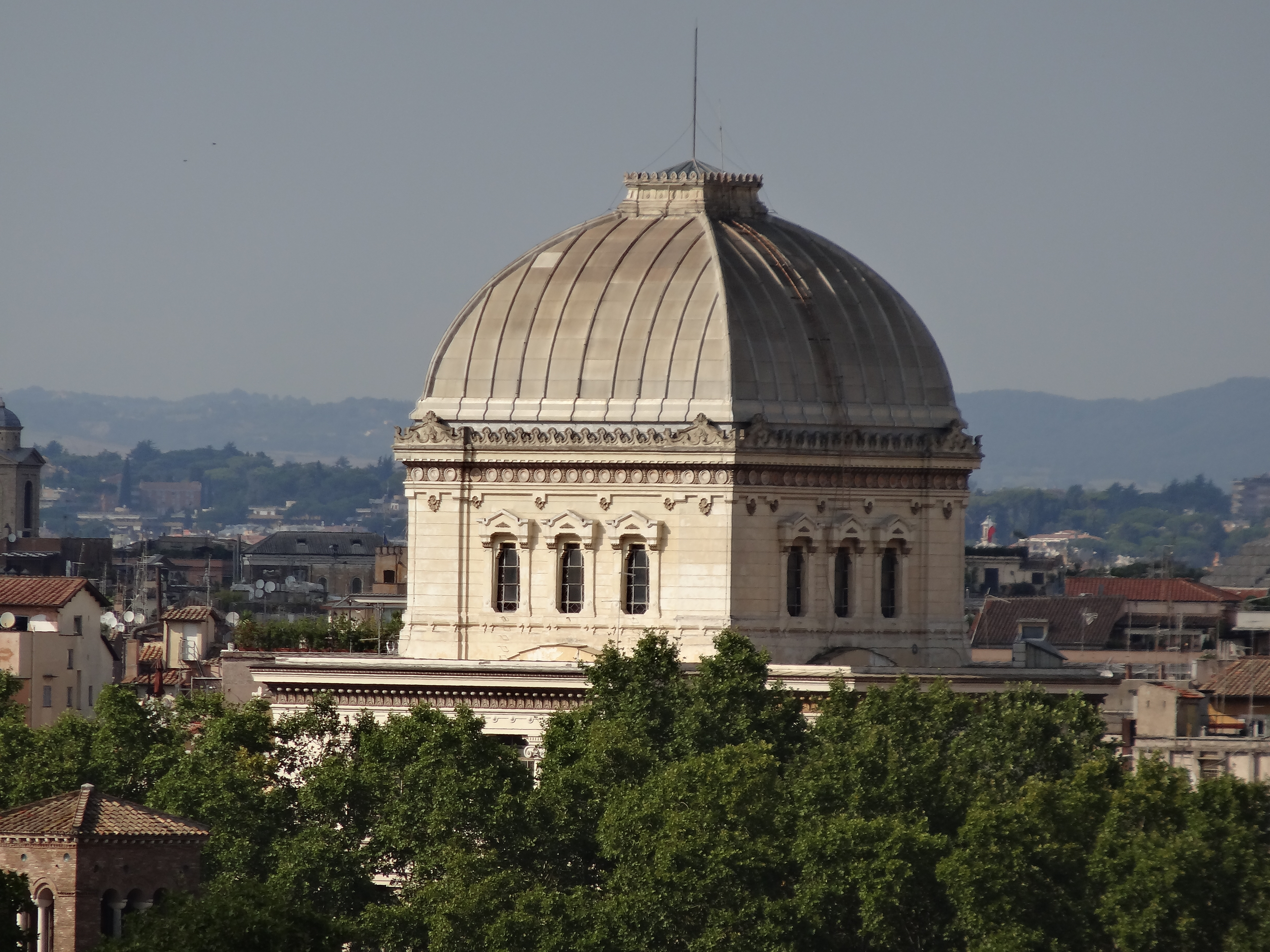
The squared dome of the Great Synagogue of Rome

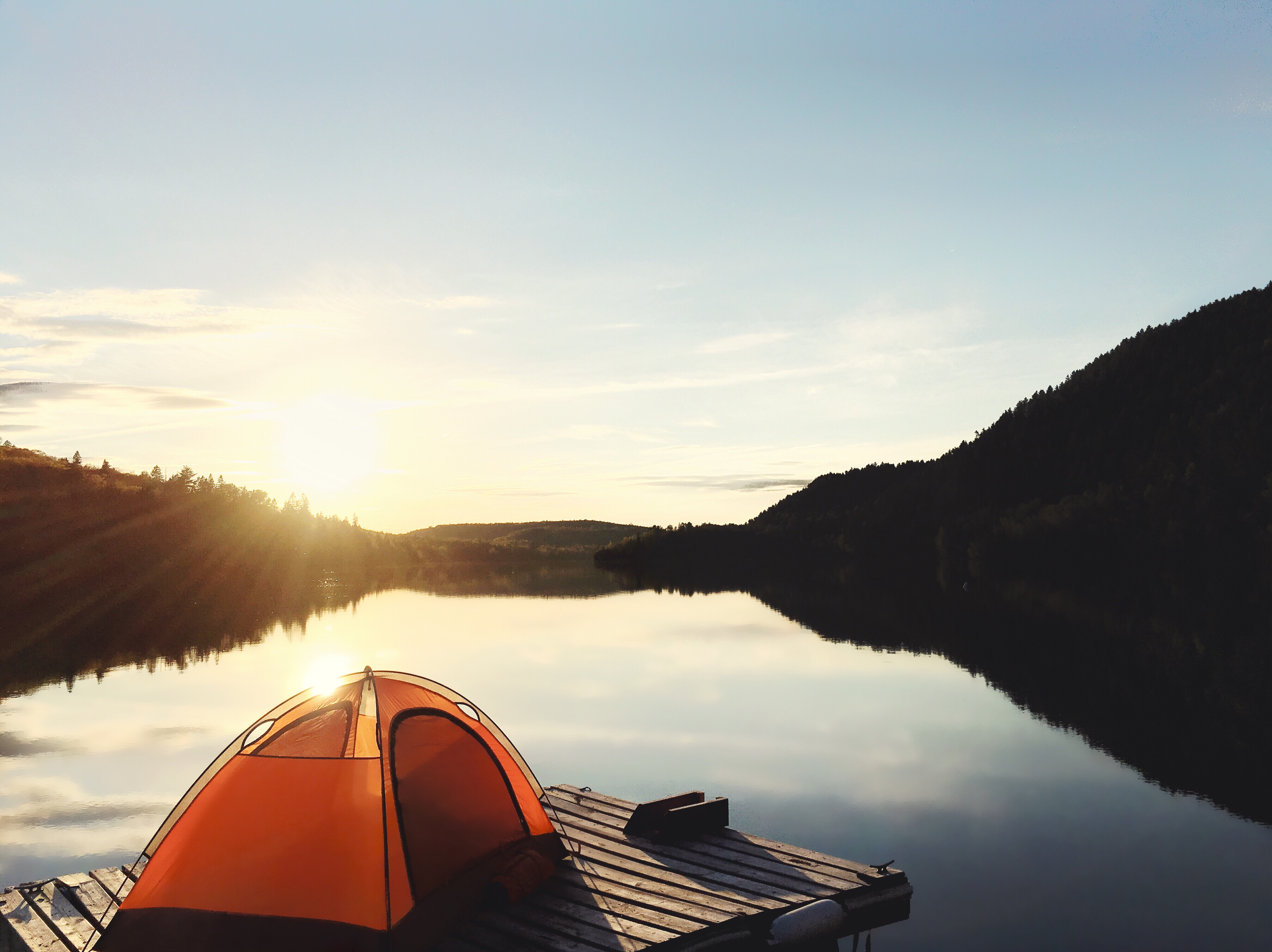
A dome tent shaped as a cloister vault

The central vault of the Patuxai monument in Laos

In architecture, a cloister vault (also called a pavilion vault) is a vault with four convex surfaces (patches of cylinders) meeting at a point above the center of the vault.

It can be thought of as formed by two barrel vaults that cross at right angles to each other: the open space within the vault is the intersection of the space within the two barrel vaults, and the solid material that surrounds the vault is the union of the solid material surrounding the two barrel vaults. In this way it differs from a groin vault, which is also formed from two barrel vaults but in the opposite way: in a groin vault, the space is the union of the spaces of two barrel vaults, and the solid material is the intersection.

A cloister vault is a square domical vault, a kind of vault with a polygonal base. Domical vaults can have other polygons as cross-sections (especially octagons) rather than being limited to squares.

== Geometry ==
Any horizontal cross-section of a cloister vault is a square. This fact may be used to find the volume of the vault using Cavalieri's principle. Finding the volume in this way is often an exercise for first-year calculus students, and was solved long ago by Archimedes in Greece, Zu Chongzhi in China, and Piero della Francesca in Renaissance Italy; for more, see Steinmetz solid.

Assuming the intersecting barrel-vaults are semi-cylindrical, the volume of the vault is $\frac{1}{3}s^3$ where s is the length of the side of the square base.

== See also ==
- List of architectural vaults
