= Voice of the Martyrs =

International Christian non-profit organization

The Voice of the Martyrs
- Abbreviation: VOM
- Formation: 1967
- Legal status: 501(c)(3)
- Region served: Worldwide

The Voice of the Martyrs (VOM) is an international nonprofit organization whose mission is to defend the human rights of persecuted Christians.

== History ==
The organization was founded in 1967 by Richard Wurmbrand, a Lutheran priest of Romanian and Jewish descent who had spent fourteen years in prison for his Christian faith in the Socialist Republic of Romania, which held a policy of state atheism. The U.S. organization today is a $50 million ministry providing practical and spiritual assistance to persecuted Christians in 68 countries. In 2016, VOM-USA completed more than 1,500 ministry projects, providing help to more than 5 million people.

There are a number of Voice of the Martyrs organizations around the world. Each mission is autonomous (and not all use the "Voice of the Martyrs" name), but they cooperate through the International Christian Association (ICA). While each country's mission has its own focus and management, they also cooperate through the ICA by sharing information and jointly funding international projects. Each office is funded through donations. There is no world headquarters or main office for Voice of the Martyrs, as each organization is an independent, self-supporting entity.

== Early history ==
The Voice of the Martyrs was founded in 1967 under the name "Jesus to the Communist World" by Richard Wurmbrand, a Romanian Lutheran priest of Jewish descent, who had worked with the underground church in Romania after it was taken over in 1944 by the USSR, which held a policy of state atheism and implemented antireligious legislation. As a consequence, he was imprisoned for 14 years for preaching Christianity. His wife, Sabina, was imprisoned for three years, including being held in a labor camp and forced to work on building the Danube-Black Sea Canal . The Wurmbrand family was eventually freed to the West after a ransom was paid for Richard's release.

In 1966, Wurmbrand testified before the Internal Security Subcommittee of the U.S. Senate about the treatment that Christians received under communist governments, raising worldwide interest in Christian persecution, and through his influence several missions were founded around the world to help support Christians who suffered under Communist persecution. After the fall of Communism in the Soviet Union and Eastern Europe, these missions expanded their focus to include those suffering religious persecution in Islamic, Hindu, and Buddhist societies.

== Financial accountability ==
The US office of The Voice of the Martyrs is organized as a 501(c)(3) nonprofit corporation and reports 95% of revenue is derived from public support. In 2016, 81.8% of donated funds were used towards ministry purposes, which break into the following categories: Persecution Response, Bibles to Captive Nations, Front-Line Ministry, and Fellowship & Inspiration. Of VOM-USA's income, 12 percent was spent on administration and 6.2 percent on fundraising. The ministry is now registered as a religious order, and as such it no longer annually files form 990 with the IRS. VOM-USA is accredited by the Evangelical Council for Financial Accountability (ECFA), and financial information about VOM can be found on ECFA's web site. Audited financial statements for the past three years are also available at VOM-USA's website.

== Publications ==
Each individual mission office publishes a regular newsletter for distribution in their own country. Each issue focuses on stories of the persecution of Christians, and offers testimonies as well as outlets for readers to get involved with persecuted Christians. Subscription to the 12-16 page newsletter is free.

Each mission also has other efforts to communicate the testimonies of persecuted Christians and stories of God's faithfulness to them. VOM-USA produces a weekly radio program, which is currently heard on more than 700 radio stations across the United States and has reached the top spot on iTunes "Religion and Spirituality" podcast chart. Missions also produce video content, including videos to promote “The International Day of Prayer for the Persecuted Church”every first Sunday in November.

== Controversy ==
In 2012, VOM-USA executive director Tom White committed suicide after allegations of child abuse were made against him. Within two weeks of his death, VOM-USA mailed a letter to every name on the ministry mailing list to inform readers of his suicide and the allegations that had been made.

In 2014, Michael Wurmbrand, son of founder Richard Wurmbrand, was fired from his position at VOM-USA's office after calling for an independent investigation into White’s overseas activities. He did so out of concern more children might have been molested, and in response to his firing he released a statement which criticized the unwillingness of the Board to do an investigation, the $28 million new headquarters, the criminal record background of a VOM-USA vice presidents, and related concerns.

In 2017, allegations were made public by dismissed employees against the leader of Voice of the Christian Martyrs - Nigeria. The allegations have been supported by former students at the school run by VOCM-Nigeria, including alleged victims. As of May 2018, Nigerian authorities have charged and released on bail the director, Isaac Oluwole Newton-Wusu, a defamation case has been filed against the accusers in court, a defamation case has been filed against the director by the accusers, and a civil suit has been filed by several of the alleged victims for threats made by the director. Prior to these allegations becoming public, VOM-USA had cut off funding to VOCM-Nigeria after the mission refused to address overcrowding in a children's home operated by VOCM.

In 2020, Eric Foley, with Voice of the Martyrs Korea, was accused of violating the inter-Korean exchange law for launching Bible balloons from South Korea into North Korea.

Voice of the Martyrs closely guards the salaries of its leaders. In 2013, however, the salary of its then-president James Dau was revealed to be $158,416, equivalent to $183,059 in 2021. According to an audited financial statement published in 2023, Voice of the Martyrs stated that its current president and CEO, Cole Richards received $211,363 in compensation.

== See also ==
- International Christian Concern, a Christian human rights NGO
- Open Doors
- Christian Solidarity Worldwide
