= Ioanid =

Ioanid is a Romanian surname. People with this surname include:

- Costache Ioanid (1912–1987), Romanian poet and songwriter
- Ion Ioanid (1926–2003), Romanian dissident and writer
- Alexandru and Paul Ioanid of the Ioanid Gang
