= Nisipari =

- Location within Romania

Location
- Country: Romania
- Counties: Constanța County
- Villages: Nisipari

Physical characteristics
- Mouth: Danube–Black Sea Canal
  - location: near Nisipari
  - coordinates: 44.2311°N 28.3695°E
- Length: 13 km (8.1 mi)
- Basin size: 41 km^{2} (16 sq mi)

Basin features
- Progression: Danube–Black Sea Canal→ Black Sea
- River code: XV.1.10b.7

The Nisipari is a small river in Constanța County, Romania. It discharges into the Danube–Black Sea Canal near the village Nisipari. Its length is 13 km (8.1 mi) and its basin size is 41 km^{2} (16 sq mi).
