= Agi Cabul =

River in Constanța, Romania

- Location within Romania

Location
- Country: Romania
- Counties: Constanța County
- Villages: Mihai Kogălniceanu, Cuza Vodă

Physical characteristics
- Mouth: Danube–Black Sea Canal
  - location: Medgidia
  - coordinates: 44.2501°N 28.2813°E
- Length: 22 km (14 mi)
- Basin size: 118 km^{2} (46 sq mi)

Basin features
- Progression: Danube–Black Sea Canal→ Black Sea
- River code: XV.1.10b.5

The Agi Cabul is a river in Constanța County, Romania. It flows into the Danube–Black Sea Canal in Medgidia. It is 22 km (14 mi) long, with a drainage basin of 118 km^{2} (46 sq mi).
