= Cocoș (Constanța) =

- Location within Romania

Location
- Country: Romania
- Counties: Constanța County
- Villages: Poiana, Poarta Albă

Physical characteristics
- Mouth: Danube–Black Sea Canal
  - location: Poarta Albă
  - coordinates: 44.2173°N 28.3885°E
- Length: 14 km (8.7 mi)
- Basin size: 65 km^{2} (25 sq mi)

Basin features
- Progression: Danube–Black Sea Canal→ Black Sea
- River code: XV.1.10b.9

The Cocoș is a small river in Constanța County, Romania. It discharges into the northern branch of the Danube–Black Sea Canal in Poarta Albă. Its length is 14 km (8.7 mi) and its basin size is 65 km^{2} (25 sq mi).
