= Tineretului statue =

- Monumentul Tineretului
- Interactive map of Tineretului statue
- Location: Straja, Constanța County, Romania
- Coordinates: 44.1145786°N 28.4444772°E
- Designer: Pavel Bucur
- Type: Monument
- Material: stainless steel and bronze
- Length: 10 metres (33 ft)
- Height: 50 metres (160 ft)
- Completion date: 1987
- Dedicated to: UTC

Tineretului statue (also called Fallen Angel, Alata or the Straja Youth Monument) is a monument in Romania near the Danube–Black Sea Canal, designed by Pavel Bucur.

== Description ==
The monument is dedicated to the Union of Communist Youth. The stainless steel structure rests on a three-sided concrete base. According to the designer, the form is an abstraction of a flame, which represents the body of a fallen angel. The original design included a pair of wings, but they were not installed, due to concerns about their structural integrity.

== Vandalism ==
Bronze plates with bas-reliefs once covered the concrete base. They depicted the construction of the canal, and politicians Elena Ceaușescu and Nicolae Ceaușescu. The bronze plaques were stolen some time after the 1989 Romanian Revolution, in c. 2000. The bronze plates were estimated to weigh between 5 and 19 tons. One of the original inscriptions makes reference to the labor camps that were used to build the canal. It reads (in Romanian):

Future generations know that we have sacrificed ourselves for the ascension of the Fatherland.

Steel plates have also been removed, and parts of the statue have been painted with graffiti. Some of the bronze plates were recovered from a recycling center.
