= Dimitrie Cuclin =

Romanian composer and philosopher (1885–1978)

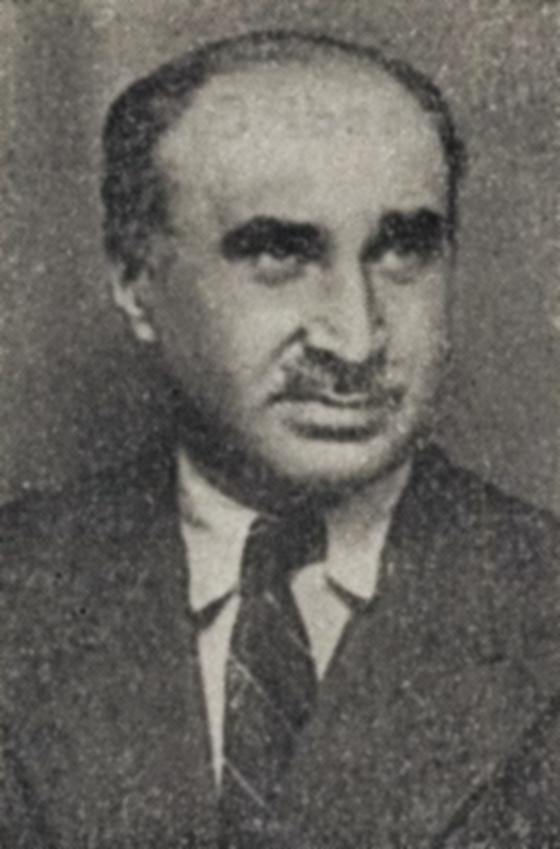
Cuclin c. 1930

Dimitrie Cuclin (5 April [O.S. 24 March] 1885 – February 7, 1978) was a Romanian classical music composer, musicologist, philosopher, translator, and writer.

== Biography ==
=== Early life ===
Cuclin was born in the city of Galaţi, a port on the left shore of the Danube. His father was an immigrant from czarist Bessarabia, from the village of Cucleni, near the town of Izmail. He had studied music at the Theological Seminar of Izmail and at the Universities of Iaşi and Bucharest. At the time of Dimitrie's birth he was a music teacher at the Vasile Alecsandri High School in Galați. His mother was of peasant origin, from the village of Pechea, located about 25 miles from Galați; she was a housewife. Cuclin completed his primary and secondary studies in his native city, where his father was his first music teacher. During high-school, he began to compose small musical pieces, which impressed the composer G.D. Kiriac, who thus suggested that Cuclin should go to Bucharest to study music.

=== Studentship ===
The young composer applied first at the Conservatory (1903), where he was rejected for being above the age limit, and then at the Royal Academy of Music (1904), where he was accepted at the section of Theory and Harmony. After three years of studentship in Bucharest, Cuclin obtained a scholarship for Paris. He failed to get into the Conservatory (he was not a brilliant violin player, although he was an acceptable one), but he was admitted at Vincent D’Indy’s Schola Cantorum, where he studied until his scholarship expired in 1914. Because of the government’s refusal to supplement his scholarship, Cuclin had to leave France without completing his studies, thus without a French university degree, but with an attestation from D’Indy that certified his competencies. In Paris he met his future wife, Zoe, born Dumitrescu, ex Damian (d. 1973). They were married in 1920.

=== Professorship ===
Once back in Romania, Cuclin was mobilised during the First World War, but did not go to the Front. He played violin at the Orchestra of Iasi, conducted by George Enescu, in what was left free of the Kingdom of Romania. After the War’s end, in 1919, he became a Professor at the Conservatory of Music, and had the title of the newly founded chair of Musical Aesthetics. Between 1922 and 1930 Cuclin taught in New York, at the Brooklyn Conservatory of Music and City College of Music. He returned to the Bucharest Conservatory in 1930 and remained there until 1948, when he retired. During the Second World War, in the times of the National Legionary State, Cuclin was briefly the Director of the Conservatory, but he did not have the best relations with the Legion, a fact that got him relieved of that responsibility.

=== Retirement ===
At the beginning of the Communist régime, Cuclin was condemned for political reasons to serve two years (1950-1952) in a labour camp at the Danube-Black Sea Canal. The event that fired up the regime’s reaction was Cuclin’s attendance at a musical soirée at the Goethe-Institute in Bucharest. He was thus imprisoned for being “idealist” and “reactionary”. After this sinister episode, Cuclin was able to create again, and in fact it is in this period that he commenced his career as a symphonist. Towards the end of his life, he was close to being elected a correspondent member of the Romanian Academy, but the proletkult poet Mihai Beniuc opposed the move. He died in Bucharest in 1978 from the complications of heart disease contracted while a prisoner in the communist work camps.

=== Awards and distinctions ===
- 1913 - The First Prize for Composition at the First Edition of the International Festival "George Enescu" from Bucharest
- 1934 - The Prize of the Romanian Academy for the Treatise of Musical Aesthetics
- 1939 - The National Prize for Composition
- 1955 - The State Prize
- 1969 - The Order "Meritul Cultural"
- 1978 - The Great Prize of the Union of the Composers from Romania

== Music ==
Cuclin created a symphonic corpus containing 20 symphonies, and he was a representative of the monumental in symphonic writing. Some of his symphonies last the length of a whole symphonic concert (the twelfth, which is the longest, lasts six hours).

Operas:

- Soria (1911)
- Ad majorem feminae gloriam (1915)
- Trajan and Dochia (1921)
- Agamemnon (1922)
- Bellerophon (1925)
- Meleagridele (1958)

Symphonies:

- Symphony no. 1 (1910)
- Symphony no. 2 (1938)
- Symphony no. 3 (1942)
- Symphony no. 4 (1944)
- Symphony no. 5 (1947) with soloists and chorus
- Symphony no. 6 (1948)
- Symphony no. 7 (1948)
- Symphony no. 8 (1948)
- Symphony no. 9 (1949)
- Symphony no. 10 (1949) with chorus
- Symphony no. 11 (1950)
- Symphony no. 12 (1951) with soloists and chorus,
- Symphony no. 13 (1951)
- Symphony no. 14 (1952)
- Symphony no. 15 (1954)
- Symphony no. 16 (1959) Triumph of Peace
- Symphony no. 17 (1965)
- Symphony no. 18 (1967)
- Symphony no. 19 (1971)
- Symphony no. 20 (1972) Triumph of the Peoples Union

Concertos:

- Violin Concerto (1920)
- Piano Concerto (1939)
- Clarinet Concerto (1968)

Other works:

- Romanian Dances for Orchestra (1961)
- Tragedy in the forest (1962), ballet

He is also the author of three string quartets and numerous other chamber, piano pieces, sacred choruses and songs. In addition to these, Cuclin composed sonatas, madrigals, melodies of folkloric inspiration, etc. A detailed list of his works and bibliography is contained in Viorel Cosma's "Muzicieni romani" (Bucharest 1970).

As a composer, Cuclin is an exponent of the French school, following the line of César Franck and Vincent D’Indy.

== Literature ==
Cuclin wrote a lot of poetry, of which only a small part is published, and was also a translator of poetry.

=== Original works ===
Cuclin wrote in Romanian, English, and French. His literary works comprise theater plays, opera librettos, and poems. Among his published volumes, the following are the most important:

- Destinée mystique. Poésies diverses, Bucarest : Imprimeries Independența, 1919 (in French)
- Poems, Bucharest, Tiparul Oltenia, year unknown (in English)
- Doinas and Sonnets, Bucharest, Tiparul Oltenia, 1932 (in Romanian)
- Sofonisba: Versified Tragedy in One Prologue and Three Acts, Bucharest, Tipografia Presa, 1945

Cuclin's poetry follows the antebellic paradigm of the Romanian literature, imposed by such writers as Heliade Rădulescu, Bolintineanu, Alexandrescu, Alecsandri, Eminescu, Vlahuţă, Coşbuc and Goga. He cultivates especially the sonnet, of which he has a musical understanding: the sonnet was for him the literary equivalent of a sonata. It is no wonder that, in the '70s, he failed to have a new poetry volume published: his style was long time outdated.

=== Translations ===
As a translator, Cuclin made himself remarked by his translation of Eminescu's poems in English: Poems, Bucharest, I.E.Toroutiu, 1938.

He translated also from Latin the first two books of Ovid's Fasti, published by the same editor, year unknown.

== Philosophy ==
=== Works ===
Cuclin had a permanent preoccupation for metaphysics all his life and he wrote several versions of a work called A Treatise of the Metaphysics. The earliest such treatise that is available in manuscript is entitled La théorie de l’immortalité (1931), and an abridged version in Romanian, realised by Cuclin himself, was published only in 1990. The latest integral version of a Traité de la métaphysique dates from the ’50, most probably after Cuclin’s release from the labour camp. There are indications that Cuclin wrote at least four versions of the treatise, in French and Romanian, but those could not be found, as they are buried in the private collections.

This last book-length treatise has two subtitles, namely, “A theory of nothingness” and “Towards a new aspect of Marxism”. Cuclin had the naivety to think that the official Marxism could incorporate his philosophy. We have several published compressed versions of his metaphysical system, some being to his disciples which noted them after a lecture or oral exposition of the master, and one being written by Cuclin himself (in Cuclin 1986), thus more reliable .

Other published works with philosophical content are Musique: science, art et philosophie (Cuclin 1934), in the documents of the Eighth International Congress of Philosophy from Prague and his innovatory Treatise of Musical Aesthetics (Cuclin 1933). The first part of this treatise is a partial exposition of his metaphysical vision, the foundation of his aesthetics.

=== Ideas ===
==== General overview ====
The system of Cuclin is a form of idealism, but not one very easy to characterise. It is a musical panpsychism, claiming influence from the Pythagorean thought, and showing the Absolute to be a living system of harmonized functions, in continuous expansion. It has been suggested that his particular brand of idealism be called “functionalist idealism” (Rusu 2002). During the communist period, the philosophy of Cuclin was considered a materialist dualism (Matei 1985, Tănase 1985), point of view contested by Rusu.

==== Concept of metaphysics ====
Cuclin's explications concerning the title of his Traité de la métaphysique are of great value for the understanding of his vision. Thus, we have “a treatise” and not “the treatise”, because metaphysics can be exposed in many treatises; and we have “of the metaphysics”, and not “of metaphysics”, because there is but one “metaphysics”. “The metaphysics” is, in fact, more like “the metaphysical realm” for Cuclin, or the domain of the transcendence. Thus, he proposed to produce one of the possible surveys of this domain.

==== Method of metaphysics ====
The method of Cuclin is the logical enquiry, followed up to an absurdity, or violent contradiction. The contradiction is the sign of reaching the truth, because the truth is found in logical reasoning, not in reason. An absurdity is the sign that the reason does not agree with the results of the logical reasoning, but is not a sign of unreality or falseness. Rather the opposite is true, that the point of view of the reason is unreliable and many times false. With this almost Eleatic method, Cuclin reaches some sort of spiritualist monism, which will be briefly presented in the following lines.

But firstly we will note another methodological aspect of Cuclin's metaphysics, namely the contribution of the “science of music” to the knowledge of the reality. The science of music is not a science of the sound, because the sound is not essential to music. The phenomenon of the “enharmony” and the fact that each sound can have different functions in different chords proves to Cuclin that the sound is only the contingent bearer of a “function” which can have other contingent bearers, like emotion and feeling. The “function” is determined as a degree of movement of the soul, towards pleasure or pain. Thus, the music is literally done with the soul, not with the sound, and it passes from the sound into the soul in virtue of this invariant which is the function. The science of music, then, provides us with the laws of the function, the ultimate component of reality.

==== Categories ====
Cuclin's central category is that of essence, which constitutes the ultimate ontological ground. Equated by Cuclin with the pure nothingness, but a positive nothingness, like the Buddhist nirvana, the essence it is roughly an equivalent of the spirit, but it differs greatly because it presents itself as a system of harmonics, like an absolute sound composed of infinitely many harmonics, each one bearing a specific function within the whole. This realm of essence, governed by the laws of harmony (which laws we know from the science of music) has a will, and a purpose for the realising of which the will mobilises. The purpose of this great harmonic system is to acquire self-consciousness. Therefore, the essence degrades itself in an impure mode, the substance, which is the second fundamental category of Cuclin's metaphysics.

==== Cosmology ====
The process of degradation that commences with the pure essence and ends with the pure substance is called by Cuclin “the separation of essence”. In this process of separation are generated diverse entities which are a mixture of substance and essence, where one of these aspects is prevalent. Actually, every extant thing is a mixture of essence and substance in different proportions. The first element into which the essence separates is the magnetism (or magnetic field), from which is further separated the electricity, followed by light and so on until the living matter is obtained. This cosmology, mostly fantastic, bears the influences of evolutionism and voluntarism, with a trace of Hegelianism.

==== Artistic creation and immortality ====
The human being is a culmination of the substantialisation of the essence; from here the reverted process can begin, that of the re-essentialisation of the substance. The first process, the separation of the essence or its substantialisation, was also called analysis. The process of the re-essentialistion of the substance is called synthesis. Through this synthetic process which is the human creation, the re-essentialised substance can be transposed as a magnetic double in a great harmonic system, which is the image of the pure essence, regarded as re-essentialised substance. Thus, the essence stand in front of itself and, with the help of the human creation, takes consciousness of itself. This implies an ethics of creation and a theory of immortality. Through his creations the man constitutes a magnetic double of his personality, which is integrated in the great harmonic system which is the Essence. Thus, by contributing through creation to the becoming self-conscious of the Essence, the man becomes also immortal.

==== Influence ====
Although isolated from the community of the philosophers, Cuclin had private disciples which assimilated his philosophy (e.g. Ion Bârsan). One of his students, Alexandru Bogza, wrote in solitude a philosophical system, called "the critical realism" (no connection with the homonymous American philosophical movement), published posthumously. This system bears the traces of a certain Cuclinian influence (Cuclin is quoted several times by Bogza), but the depth of this influence is yet to be assessed.
