= Murat Yusuf =

Romanian imam, mufti of the Muslim Community in Romania

Personal details
- Born: August 18, 1977 (age 49) Poarta Albă, Romania
- Spouse: Güler
- Children: 2

Murat Yusuf (also known as Murat Iusuf; born August 18, 1977, in Poarta Albă) is a Romanian Muslim cleric of Tatar origins, currently the Mufti of the Muslim Community in Romania.

== Biography ==
=== Studies ===
Yusuf began school in Romania, but in order to study Islamic theology, continued his education in Turkey, starting in 1991. He studied at the Edirne Theological High School from 1991 to 1994, then taking TÖMER classes to perfect his Turkish (1994–95), and in 1995 he was admitted to the 19 Mayis Faculty of Islamic Theology in Samsun, from which he graduated in 2000.

From 2001 to 2003, he took advanced master's courses in Pastoral Mission at the Faculty of Orthodox Theology of Valahia University, Târgovişte, obtaining a master's degree with a dissertation titled "The Juridical Islamic and Christian Ethos in Dobruja". Since 2004 he has been a doctorate student in Canon Law at the Faculty of Orthodox Theology of Ovidius University, Constanţa, under the scientific guidance of Fr. Prof. Dr. Nicolae Dură, with the theme of his doctoral thesis being "Human Rights according to Islamic Law and Canon Law".

In 2000 he became a teacher of Islamic religion at "Constantin Brâncuși" School in Medgidia, then teaching at the Mircea cel Bătrân High School, Traian High School and Ovidius High School in Constanţa. In 2000-01 he was a specialist consultant on the translation of the book Dervis Dede'nin Dilinden Iman Esaslari. In 2000, he became a religious councillor within the Muftiate of the Muslim Community in Romania, holding the position until being elected to his present office. In 2001 he became a member of the national commission charged with publishing syllabi for theology courses.

He has hosted conferences with the following themes: "Islam and Science", "Tolerance in Islam", "The Need for Religion in Society", "Religion and Democracy", "Muslims in Romania: Past, Present and Future". He has published articles in Günisigi Gazetesi, a local Turkish newspaper, and in Kardeler, a monthly Turkish magazine. He speaks Romanian, Turkish, Arabic and English.

=== As mufti ===
Elections for the post of mufti took place at the headquarters of the Muslim Community in Romania (Constanţa), on the evening of September 15, 2005. The elections took place when the five-year term of Mufti Bagâş Sanghirai expired. The Sura-Islam (Synodal Council) consists of 15 clerics, 8 laymen, the outgoing mufti and the head of the Kemal Atatürk Theological High School. Imam Murat Yusuf, then 28, was elected for a five-year term. The youngest Romanian mufti, he was elected with 19 of 25 votes. He defeated Resul Maarem, Osman Negeat, Halil Ismeat and Bagâş Sanghirai, who as the outgoing mufti could run an unlimited number of times.

The new mufti took office on October 1, 2005, when the Ministry of Culture and Religious Affairs confirmed his election. He was recognised as mufti by Decree nr. 959 of October 5, issued by the President of Romania and published in Monitorul Oficial (causing the decree to take effect) the next day.

Upon his election, Yusuf announced wide-ranging plans for the re-invigoration of Islamic life, especially in the area of Islam's image, for, as he noted, Muslims have been perceived as extremists following a number of terrorist attacks. He also said that he wished to highlight Dobruja as an area where Christians and Muslims have lived for centuries in harmony and reciprocal respect.

At the time, he also revealed his plans to institute some change in the Muftiate operates, calling for all major decisions to be taken only after consultations with a Synodal Council consisting of imams, representatives of Turkish and Tatar political parties, as well as other important Romanian Muslim personalities. These proposals reflect practices in other EU member states, but do not contradict Islamic law or tradition. Yusuf said, "We don't want to bring any changes to the Muslim faith as it is practiced in Romania".

In a 2006 interview, Yusuf commented: "Islam is not a fundamentalist religion; it doesn't have any terrorism in its verses. Currently, a very mistaken interpretation holds that any Muslim is a terrorist. Here in Romania, the native Turkish and Tatar community has lived for over seven centuries, and has developed a way of life, and it is more difficult to say of us that we are terrorists".

In April 2007, Murat Yusuf caused controversy after asking the Ministry of Education not to recognize the graduation diplomas for a number of Romanian Muslims who had received theological training in certain institutions (located in, among other countries, Saudi Arabia, Syria, Sudan, Jordan and Egypt). He justified the measure by arguing that the young men had studied "a dangerous radical [form of] Islam", and contended that they were working "in certain foundations, assisted by Arab embassies, [and] listed as organizations suspected of producing terrorist propaganda, under surveillance by the Romanian intelligence services".

== Personal life ==
Iusuf and his wife Güler have a daughter, Zehra, and a son, Muhammed Emin.
