= Danube–Black Sea Canal =

Ship canal in Romania

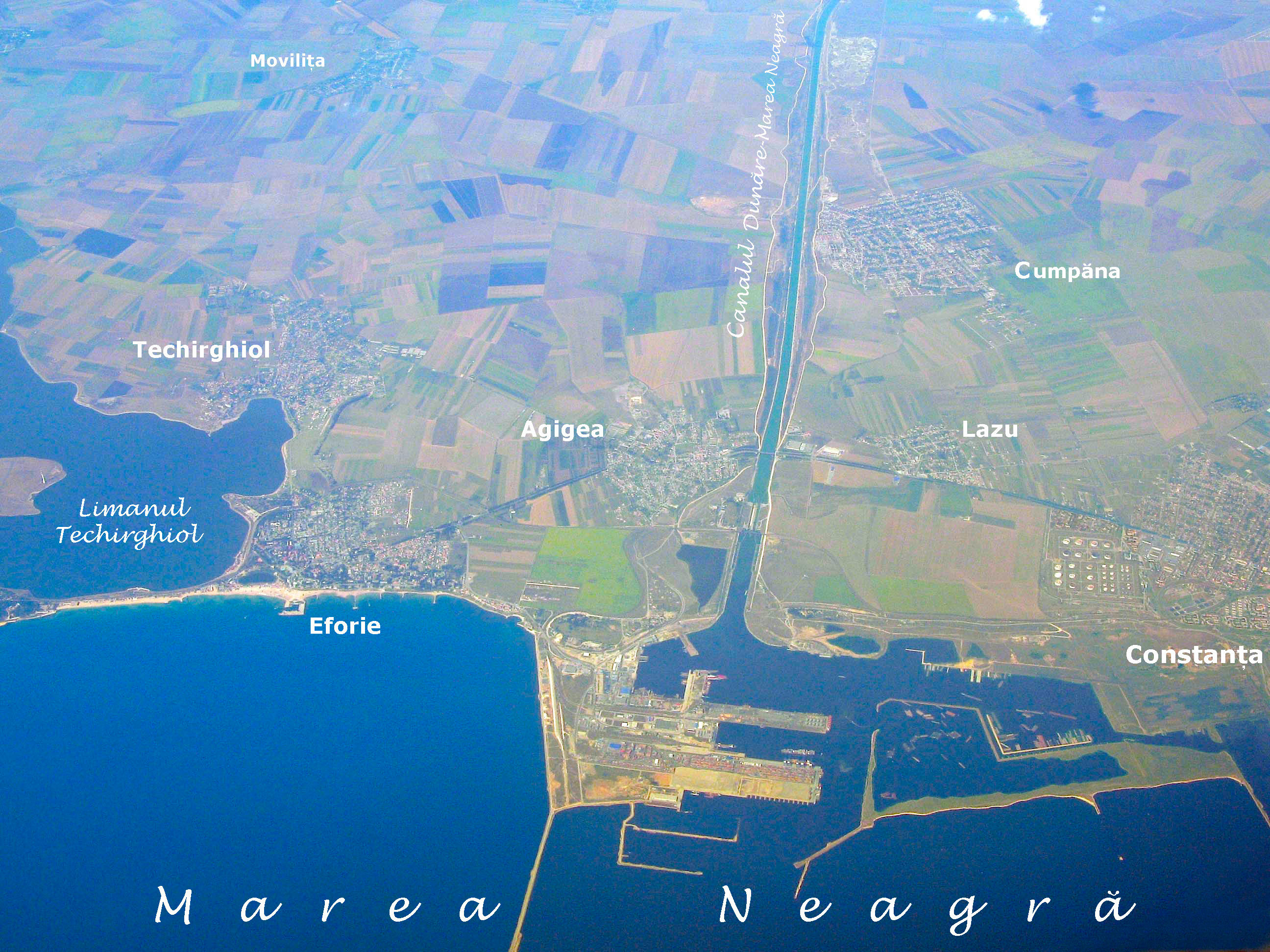
- Aerial view of the canal at its eastern end, in Constanța South Seaport

- Danube (in blue) and the Canal (in red)
- Interactive map of Danube–Black Sea Canal
- Location: Constanța County
- Country: Romania

Specifications
- Length: 95.6 km (59.4 mi) (Main branch: 64.4 km (40.0 mi)) (Northern branch: 31.2 km (19.4 mi))
- Maximum boat length: 296 m (971 ft) (main branch); 119.4 m (392 ft) (northern branch)
- Maximum boat beam: 22.8 m (75 ft) (main branch); 11.4 m (37 ft) (northern branch)
- Maximum boat draft: 5.5 m (18 ft) (main branch); 4 m (13 ft) (northern branch)
- Locks: 4 (2 on main branch + 2 on northern branch)

History
- Date completed: May 1984 (main branch); October 1987 (northern branch)

Geography
- Start point: Danube at Cernavodă
- End point: Black Sea at Agigea and Năvodari
- Beginning coordinates: 44.346°N 28.023°E
- Ending coordinates: 44.100°N 28.638°E
- Branch: Poarta Albă-Midia Năvodari Canal (northern branch)
- Official River Code: XV.1.10b

The Danube–Black Sea Canal (Romanian: Canalul Dunăre–Marea Neagră) is a navigable canal in Romania, which runs from Cernavodă on the Danube river, via two branches, to Constanța and Năvodari on the Black Sea. Administered from Agigea, it is an important part of the waterway link between the North Sea and the Black Sea via the Rhine–Main–Danube Canal. The main branch of the canal, with a length of 64.4 km (40.0 mi), which connects the Port of Cernavodă with the Port of Constanța, was built in 1976–1984, while the northern branch, known as the Poarta Albă–Midia Năvodari Canal, with a length of 31.2 km (19.4 mi), connecting Poarta Albă and the Port of Midia, was built between 1983 and 1987.

Although the idea of building a navigable canal between the Danube and the Black Sea is old, the first concrete attempt was made between 1949 and 1953, when the communist authorities of the time used this opportunity to eliminate political opponents, so the canal became notorious as the site of labor camps, when at any given time, between 5,000 and 20,000 detainees, mostly political prisoners, worked on its excavation. The total number of prisoners used as labor force during this period is unknown, with the total number of deaths being estimated at several tens of thousands. The construction works of the Danube–Black Sea Canal were to be resumed 20 years later, in different conditions.

== Geography ==
The course of the canal follows mostly the course of the former river Carasu, originally a tributary of the Danube. Therefore, hydrographically it also has the function of conveying the runoff from a 1,031 km^{2} (398 sq mi) drainage basin to the Black Sea.

The main branch extends from Cernavodă on the Danube to Poarta Albă. On this reach it goes near or through the settlements of Cernavodă, Saligny, Mircea Vodă, Medgidia, Castelu, and Poarta Albă. On this reach the canal is joined on the north bank by tributaries (from west to east): Valea Cișmelei, Valea Plantației, Agi Cabul, Castelu and Nisipari. On the south bank it is joined by tributaries (from west to east) Popa Nica and Medgidia.

At Poarta Albă the canal bifurcates into two branches. The main canal goes to the south, towards the Port of Constanța Sud Agigea. It passes near the settlements of Murfatlar, Cumpăna and Agigea. On its reach it is joined on the northeast bank by tributaries Valea Seacă and Lazu and on the southwest bank by the Siminoc, Șerplea, Potârnichea and Agigea.

The northern branch, the Poarta Albă–Midia Năvodari Canal, goes towards the Port of Midia. It passes near Nazarcea, Lumina, Ovidiu and Năvodari. On its reach it is joined by tributaries Cocoș, Nazarcea and Valea Adâncă.

=== Motivation ===
The main reasons for the building of the canal were to circumvent the Danube Delta which is difficult to navigate, shorten the distance to the Black Sea and several issues related to the loading and unloading of ships.

In its delta, the Danube is divided into three main branches, none of which is suited to optimal navigation: the Chilia branch is the deepest, but its mouths were not stable, which made navigation dangerous; the Sulina branch is not deep enough for maritime ships and it also used to be isolated from the railroad system; the Sfântu Gheorghe branch is shallow and sinuous.

At the time when the decision to build the canal was taken, it was officially announced that these works would also serve a secondary purpose, that of land reclamation, with the drainage of marshes in the area. Also during the construction period, the Danube–Black Sea Canal was advertised as a fast and direct connection between the Soviet Volga–Don Canal and Central Europe.

=== Dimensions ===
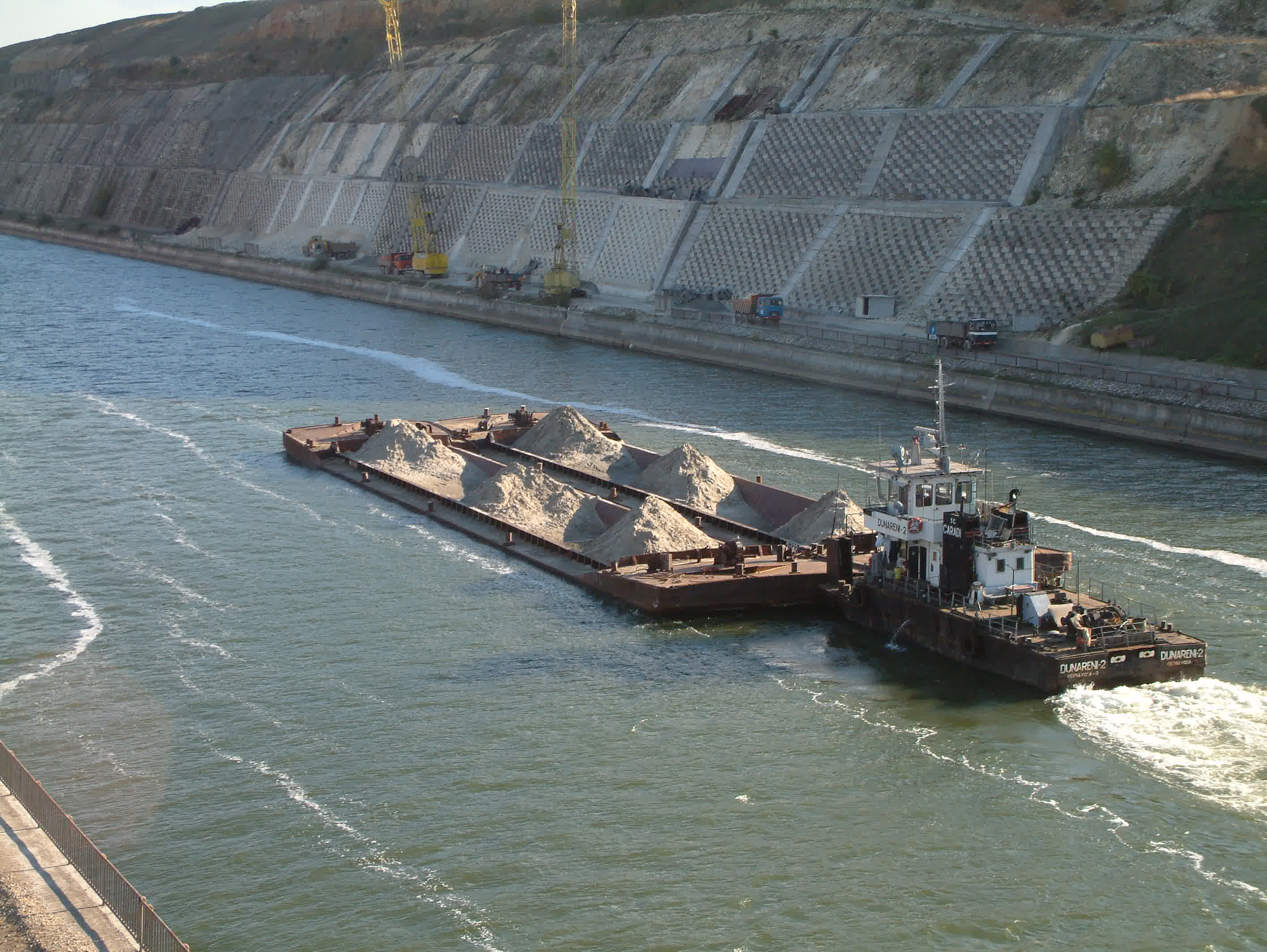
Danube – Black Sea Canal

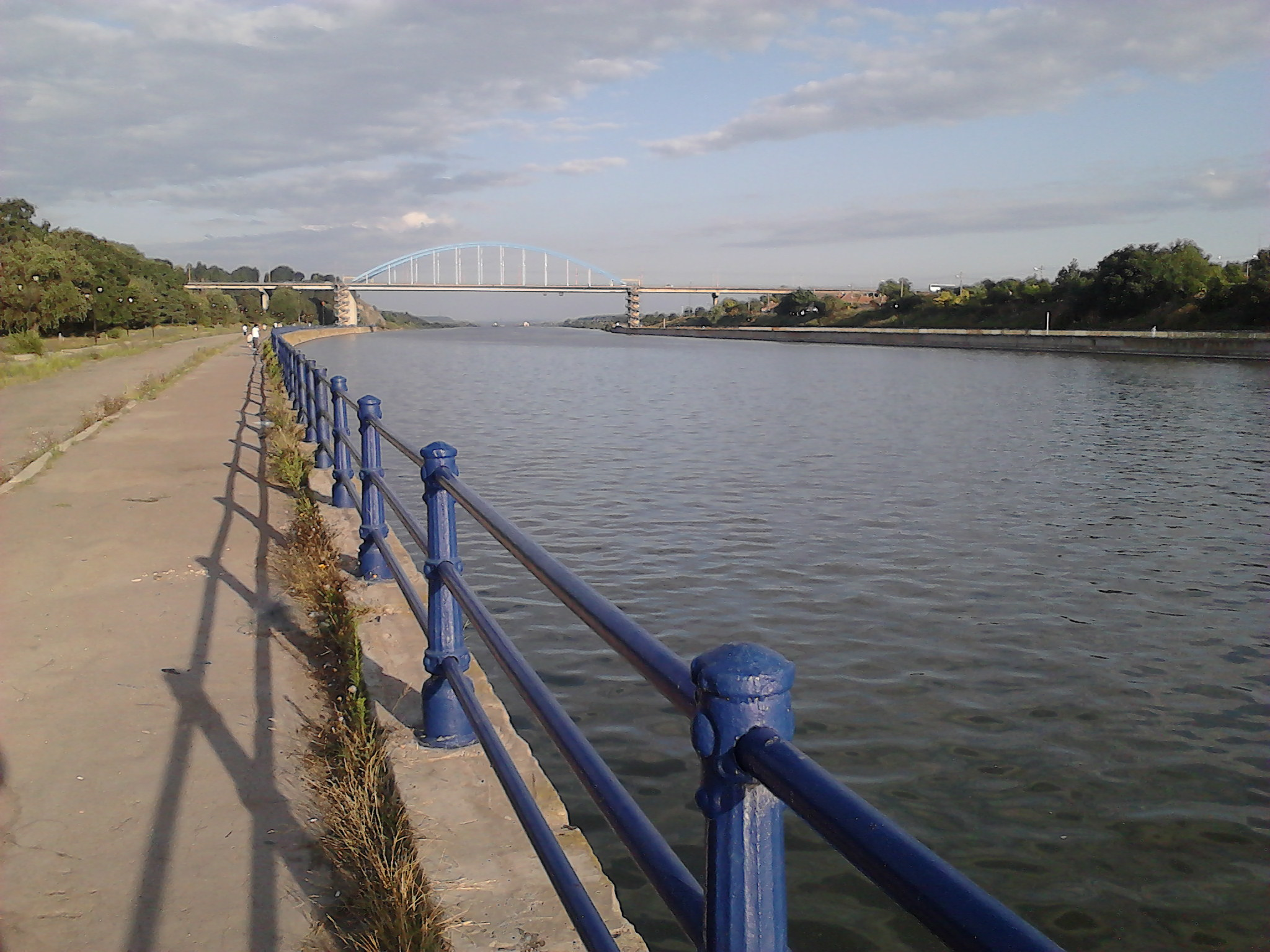
The canal in Medgidia

The 64.4 km (40.0 mi) main branch reduces the distance by boat from Constanța to Cernavodă by ca. 400 km (250 mi). It has a width of 90–150 m (300–490 ft) and a depth of 7 m (23 ft); the northern arm has a length of 31.2 km (19.4 mi), width of 50–75 m (164–246 ft) and a depth of 5.5 m (18 ft). The radius of its sharpest bends is 3 km (1.9 mi) for the main branch, and 1.2 km (0.75 mi), for the northern branch.

The waterway passes through the towns of Medgidia and Murfatlar, both of which have been turned into inland ports. It was designed to facilitate the transit of convoys comprising as much as six towed barges, up to 3,000 in tonnage each (respectively, a total of 18,000 in tonnage), 296 m (971 ft) in length and 22.8 m (75 ft) wide (ships of up to 5,000 in tonnage, as long as 138 m (453 ft) and with as much as 16.8 m (55 ft) in beam and 5.5 m (18 ft) in draft can also pass through the canal). The structure is bound by four locks (in Cernavodă and Agigea, and in Ovidiu and Năvodari, respectively).

In its final phase, the canal took over nine years to construct; 381,000,000 m^{3} (1.35×10^{10} ft^{3}) of soil were excavated (greater than the amount involved in building the Panama and Suez canals), and 5,000,000 m^{3} (180,000,000 ft^{3}) of concrete were used for the locks and support walls.

== History ==
=== Precedents ===
The earliest plans for building this canal were drawn in the late 1830s. The 1829 Treaty of Adrianople canceled the trade monopoly of the Ottoman Empire in the Danubian Principalities of Wallachia and Moldavia, allowing these countries to build their own fleets by 1834. Both Romanian and non-Romanian ships used mostly the Danube port cities of Brăila and Galați, which saw an economic boom. But there were a number of barriers to this trade: the Ottomans controlled the navigation regime on the Danube, while the Russian Empire controlled access to the Black Sea in the Danube Delta, and there was little the Danubian Principalities could do to rectify this situation. Both countries welcomed the Austrian Empire's 1834 decision, endorsed by Count István Széchenyi, to extend the steamboat navigation to the maritime Danube. The Austrian initiative was badly received by the Russians, who considered their trade through Odesa and ports in the Crimea threatened by the development of Brăila and Galați. Without resolving to direct measures, the Russian Empire, who controlled the Sulina branch, started to show rigidity, instituting on February 7, 1836, a compulsory quarantine on the island of Letea, collecting taxes to cover the Russian financial deficit, and by not performing maintenance for the navigation on the Sulina branch to remove the continuous deposits of sand.

This prompted the Austrians to conceive the idea of building a canal to connect the Danube with the Black Sea at the shortest point before the Delta, between Rasova or Cernavodă (Bogaz Köi) and Constanța (Küstendjie), and a parallel railway. The Austrian project, however, was rejected by the Ottoman Porte. Western diplomats and newspapers accused the Russian government that through bribing and intimidation, it determined the Ottoman officials to reject the proposal of Szechenyi's company. In 1839, Széchenyi got the approval of his and Ottoman governments to ensure the transport of goods and people without getting to Sulina by a transshipment on dry land. Carts and coaches made a 7–8 hour trip from Cernavodă to Constanța, where people and goods were boarding other ships for Istanbul. The enterprise was scrapped after 4 years due to non-profitability because of a low number of passengers, high cost of transport, and poor conditions of cargo handling in the unfit roadstead of the port of Constanța.

In its place, a new Brăila–Istanbul route was established. However, by 1844, the depth of the Sulina branch had decreased to 7–9 feet, from 13–14 feet in 1836, due to lack of dredging by the Russian authorities which controlled the passage. The Austrian government made a new attempt to cut a canal, sending the military engineer Colonel Baron Karl von Bigaro to prospect the land. But the idea had to be abandoned again due to technical problem, first of all due to the unfitness of the port of Constanța for large international trade.

In 1850, the Moldavian scholar Ion Ionescu de la Brad proposed yet another project, supported by Ion Ghica and by the Scottish diplomat David Urquhart, the secretary of the United Kingdom's Embassy in the Ottoman Empire. Ghica lobbied Brad's project to Ahmed Vefik, who gave a negative response for fear of provoking Russia.

The Crimean War of 1854–1856, added a military and strategical dimension for this plan. The British and French allies landed at Varna in the summer of 1854, followed by the withdrawal of Russian troops from Wallachia and Moldavia and the advancement of Ottoman and Austrian ones. In 1855, the French government put forward an initiative, and the Ottomans approved it, for the cheapest solution: build a strategic road between Cernavodă and Constanța. Engineer Charles Lalanne was put in charge of these works, that started in the summer of 1855 and were finished by the year's end. According to the newspaper Zimbrul of Iași, the work was performed by 300 physically strong men of moderate character selected in Moldavia and Wallachia.

The building of the road did not eliminate, however, the need for a canal, and the Austrian government renewed its persuading efforts. According to Gazeta de Transilvania in July 1855, Baron Karl Ludwig von Bruck, the Austrian Finance Minister, founded a stock company to build the desired canal. According to an article in Zimbrul on July 23, 1855, the project was of interest to Britain, the French Empire and the Austrian Empire, who were asking the Ottoman government to allot the concession of the canal and the fitting of the port of Constanța to a consortium under the direction of the three countries. The Ottomans were to lease a league of land on each side of the canal for 99 years, where colonist could be settled. Goods were to travel freely, with ships having to pay only a per tone tax, significantly lower than the one on the Sulina branch. According to the newspaper Steaua Dunării from January 24, 1856, the Sultan issued a firman to the Anglo-French–Austrian consortium Wilson–Morny–Breda, represented by Forbes Campbell, authorizing it to build the canal which was to be called Abdul Medjid. The 12 articles of the Concession Act were published in Bukurester Deutsche Zeitung.

The construction plans for the canal took a different turn with the signing of the Treaty of Paris on March 30, 1856, ending the war. Russia ceded the Danube mouths to the Ottomans and southern Bessarabia (lately organised as the Cahul, Bolgrad and Ismail counties) to their vassal, Moldavia. The freedom of international navigation on the Danube was restored; passage taxes were canceled, police and quarantine rules were simplified; and the European Commission of the Danube was established, with representatives of seven powers: Britain, France, Austria, Russia, the Ottoman Empire, the Kingdom of Prussia, and the Kingdom of Sardinia. The commission was responsible for the clearing of the Danube mouths from deposits of the river, and when necessary with clearing natural barriers, with the goal of ensuring of good conditions for navigation. The effect was that Austria, Britain, and France changed their attitude to the project for a Danube–Black Sea canal. The newspaper Zimbrul announced on May 25, 1856 that the plan for building the canal was abandoned; instead a railroad line between Cernavodă and Constanța was to be built. After two and a half years of construction, the line was inaugurated on October 4, 1860. Following the opening of the line, goods were easily and inexpensively transported from Constanța by rail, so plans for a canal were again abandoned.

As the United Principalities of Moldavia and Wallachia (1859) remained formally Ottoman vassals, and moreover Dobruja was directly administered by the Ottomans, the idea to build the canal was not of interest to the Romanians at that time. But following the Russo-Turkish War of 1877–1878, Romania acquired formal independence, lost again southern Bessarabia to Russia, but gained Dobruja. The idea to build a canal became a national issue, which could promote Romania's international trade. However, in the following years the development of trade was concentrated mainly on the Sulina Canal. Another project was consequently rejected by King Carol I after consultations with Grigore Antipa. During World War I, Austro-Hungarian authorities taking part in the occupation of southern Romania proposed a canal from Cernavodă to Constanța, passing through Murfatlar, of which 10 miles between Cernavodă and Murfatlar would be in a tunnel and the rest of 27 miles would be in the open.

In 1927, the Romanian engineer Jean Stoenescu-Dunăre drafted a new set of plans. Afterwards, because of the Great Depression, World War II, and political turmoil in Romania (see Romania during World War II), construction did not start until 1949, after the establishment of the Romanian Communist regime.

=== First attempt (1949–1953) ===
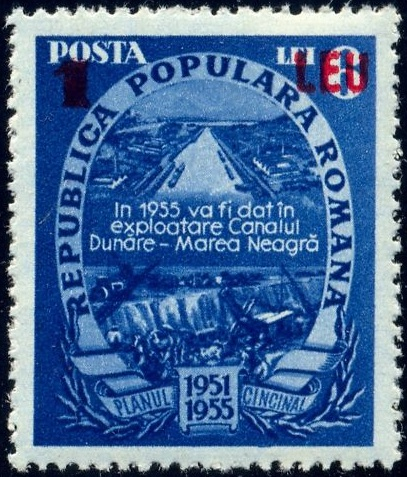
1951 postage stamp (overprinted in 1952 following the monetary reform) announcing the canal would be ready in 1955

The idea of starting the construction of the Danube–Black Sea Canal seems to have been suggested to Romanian leader Gheorghe Gheorghiu-Dej by Soviet leader Joseph Stalin during a visit to the Moscow Kremlin in 1948. Gheorghiu-Dej's chief of staff stated that Stalin indicated the canal as a means of getting rid of the rich peasants and of the so-called "enemies of the people" and promised support to the authorities in identifying the people hostile to the regime and by providing construction equipment for the canal. He also stated that Gheorghiu-Dej was not convinced by Stalin's recommendations, suspecting that the canal was actually part of the Soviet Union's expansion strategy. It has since been found out that Stalin's initiative was based on a secret study, commissioned in 1947–1948, which recommended building a Soviet submarine base at the Port of Midia, which was suitable due to its proximity to the Bosphorus and because of the rocky foundation.

On May 25, 1949, the Politburo of the Central Committee of the Romanian Workers' Party was presented a report by Gheorghiu-Dej on the projected construction of a canal linking the Danube and the Black Sea and on the economic and cultural development of the neighboring area. Estimating that this important construction was an important component of the construction of socialism in Romania, the Politburo recommended that the project be submitted to the Council of Ministers for the approval of the immediate start of the preparatory work for the construction of the canal. On the same day Gheorghiu-Dej, at that time first vice-president of the Council of Ministers, presented his proposal to the council, presided by Petru Groza, which approved it immediately. Work started on June 29. In a speech held on August 22, 1949 Anna Pauker hailed the construction of the canal claiming "we are building the canal without the bourgeoisie and against the bourgeoisie". Banners with this slogan were set up in all construction sites of the canal.

In October 1949, the authorities established a General Directorate to oversee both the works and the penal facilities, answering directly to the national leadership. Its first head was Gheorghe Hossu a former mechanic and tractor driver who had been promoted to the position of first-secretary of the Romanian Worker's party in Tulcea County and administrator of the State Fisheries. He was replaced in 1951 by Meyer Grünberg, in turn replaced by Mihail Povstanschi under the name of Vasile Posteucă, who held the position from 1952 to 1953. According to historian Adrian Cioroianu, all three were insufficiently trained for the task they were required to accomplish. By 1952, the Directorate came under the direct supervision of the Internal Affairs Ministry, and the Securitate was allowed direct intervention on the construction site.

On July 18, 1953, the project came to a discreet halt (according to some sources, the closure had been ordered by Stalin himself, as early as 1952). From 1959, part of the works built between 1949 and 1953 was used for the Mircea Vodă irrigation complex, later developed into the Carasu irrigation system, while another part of the excavations was capitalized during the construction of the northern branch of the canal, 30 years later.

==== Forced labor and repression ====
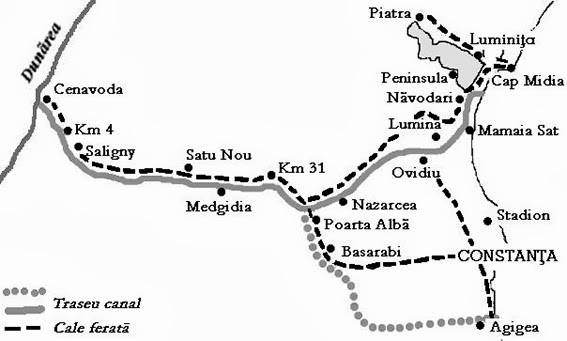
Map of forced labor camps along the Danube–Black Sea Canal building site

Prison camps sprang up all along the projected canal route in the summer of 1949 and were quickly filled with prisoners brought from jails from throughout the country. These first arrivals were soon joined by newly arrested people who were sent to the canal in ever increasing numbers. By 1950 the forced labor camps set up along the length of the planned canal were filled to capacity; that year alone, up to 15,000 prisoners were held in those camps. In 1952, more than 80% of the workforce at the canal consisted of detainees. By 1953, the number of prisoners had swelled to 20,193, or 40,000, or as high as 60,000; other estimates put the number at 40,000 or 100,000 for the entire period. British historian and New York University professor Tony Judt assessed in his book, Postwar: A History of Europe Since 1945, that, overall, one million Romanians had been imprisoned in various prisons and labor camps, including those on the path of the canal.

The construction effort surpassed the resources available to the Romanian economy in the 1950s. The canal was assigned inferior machinery, part of which had already been used on the Soviet Volga–Don Canal, and building had to rely on primitive techniques (most work appears to have been carried out using shovels and pickaxes, which was especially hard in the rocky terrain of Northern Dobruja). Detainees were allocated to brigades, usually run by common criminals, which were encouraged to use violence against their subordinates. In parallel, the region's industrialization, destined to assist in the building effort, was never accomplished.

Sums allocated for prisoners' health, hygiene and nutrition declined dramatically over the years. Food rations were kept to a minimum, and prisoners would often resort to hunting mice and other small animals, or even consuming grass in an attempt to supplement their diet.

Starting in summer 1949, the commander of the Canal security troops was lieutenant colonel Augustin Albon. According to the 2006 report of the Tismăneanu Commission, Albon employed torture methods against the detainees, and personally killed many of them. Other security officers who used often cruel and deadly methods with the prisoners were senior lieutenant Liviu Borcea, at the Midia Camp; captain Petre Burghișan, at the Galeș and Peninsula camps; lieutenant Chirion at Peninsula; captain Nicolae Doicaru, director of the Securitate's Regional Directorate Constanța; and sergeant Grigore Ion Iliescu.

The prisoners were dispossessed farmers who had attempted to resist collectivization, former activists of the National Peasants' Party, the National Liberal Party, the Romanian Social Democratic Party, and the fascist Iron Guard, Zionist Jews, as well as Orthodox and Catholic priests. The canal was referred to as the "graveyard of the Romanian bourgeoisie" by the Communist authorities, and the physical elimination of undesirable social classes was one of its most significant goals.

According to Marius Oprea, the death rate among political prisoners at the canal was extremely high; for instance, in the winter of 1951–52, there were one to three detainees dying every day at the Poarta Albă camp, near Galeșu village. The Presidential Commission for the Study of the Communist Dictatorship in Romania presented an estimate of several thousand deaths among the political prisoners used in the project, significantly higher than 656 officially recorded by an official report from 1968. Journalist Anne Applebaum had previously claimed that over 200,000 had died in its construction, as a result of exposure, unsafe equipment, malnutrition, accidents, tuberculosis and other diseases, over-work, etc., while political analyst Vladimir Socor had estimated the number of deaths to be "considerably in excess of 10,000". According to Andrei Muraru, a historian and adviser to Romanian President Klaus Iohannis, the project became known as The Death Canal (Canalul Morții). It has also been called "a cesspool of immense human suffering and mortality". Investigations conducted by the Association of Former Political Prisoners of Romania (AFDPR) Constanța, based on death records from the villages found along the Canal route, indicate 6,355 "Canal workers" (a euphemism for detainees) died during the 1949–1953 period.

In parallel, authorities left aside sectors of employment for skilled workers, kept in strict isolation from all others, they were attracted to the site with exceptional salaries (over 5,000 lei per month), as well as for young people drafted into the Romanian Army and whose files indicated "unhealthy origins" (a middle-class family background). Their numbers fluctuated greatly (regular employees went from 13,200 in 1950 to 15,000 in 1951, to as little as 7,000 in early 1952, and again to 12,500 later in that year). At the same time, facilities meant to accommodate the projected influx of labor (including homes available on credit) were never actually completed. This was overlooked by the propaganda machine, which furnished Stakhanovite stories instead, according to which work quotas were surpassed by as much as 170%. Authorities also claimed the construction site was offering training to previously unskilled workers (as many as 10,000 in one official communiqué).

After the cessation of works, in 1953, the canal camps remained in existence for another year, and their prisoners progressively relocated, to similar conditions at other work sites in Northern Dobruja. Penal facilities on the canal site were shut down in mid-1954.

==== Trial ====
Blame for the debilitating and unsuccessful works was eventually placed on a group of alleged conspirators, who were indicted in a show trial in late 1952 on trumped-up charges of espionage, fraud, and sabotage. The inquiry was orchestrated by Iosif Chișinevschi.

Three people were executed (the engine driver Nichita Dumitrescu, and the engineers Aurel Rozei-Rozenberg and Nicolae Vasilescu-Colorado); others were imprisoned for various terms. Defendants in a second group, around the engineer Gheorghe Crăciun, were sentenced to various harsh penalties (including three life imprisonments). Torture was applied by a Securitate squad led by Alexandru Nicolschi, as a means to obtain forced confessions.

=== Construction (1973–1987) ===
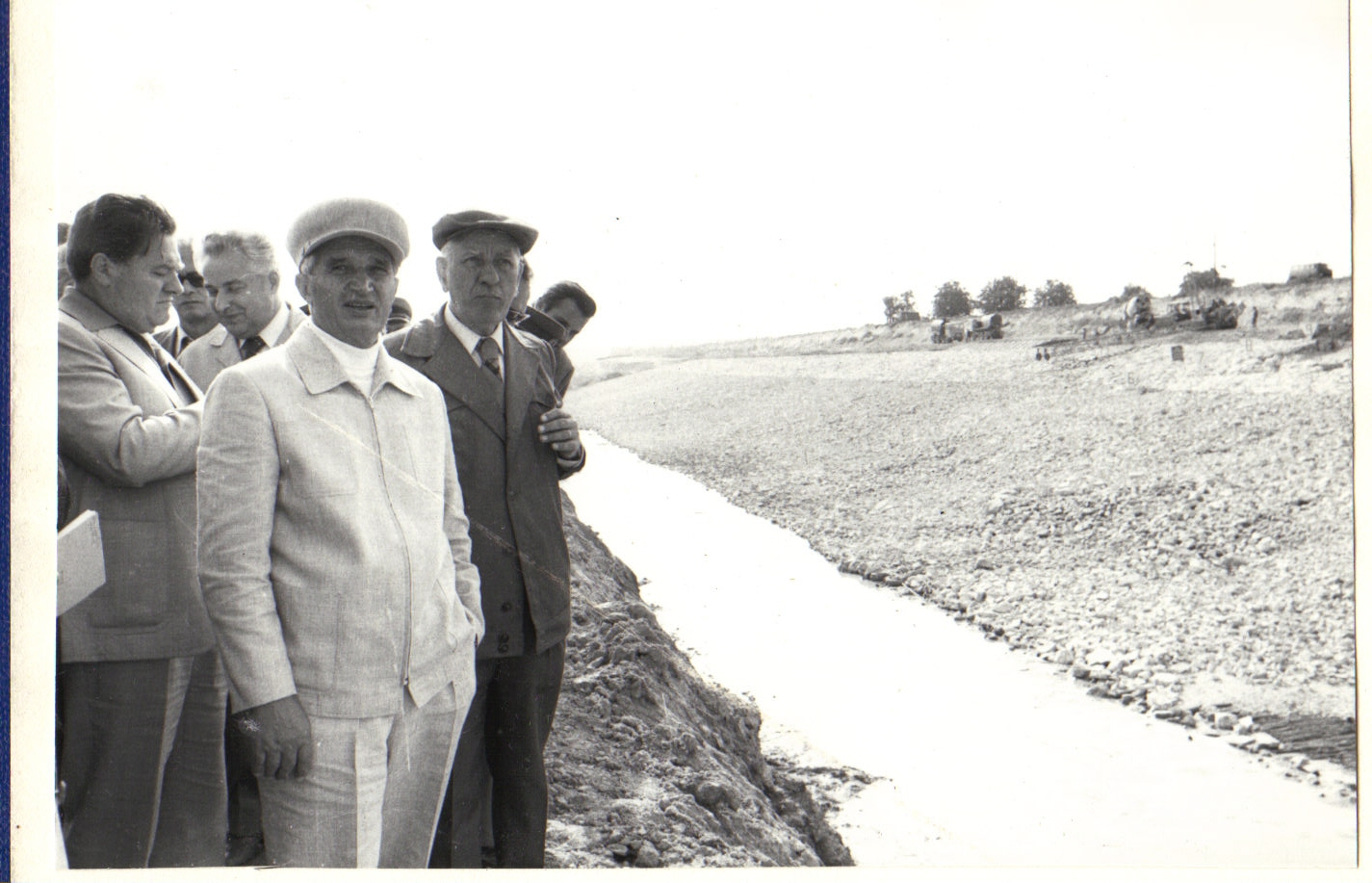
Ceaușescu (foreground) visiting the canal construction site, summer 1979

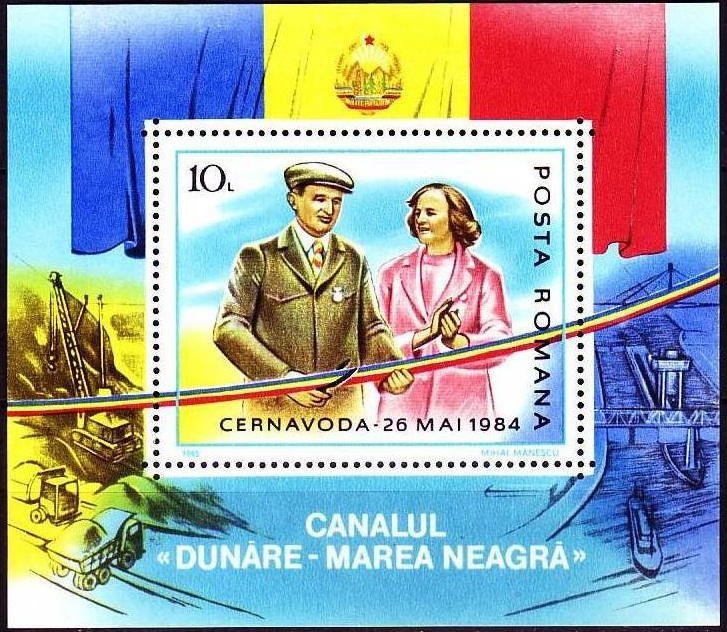
1985 stamp sheet showing Nicolae and Elena Ceaușescu inaugurating the canal

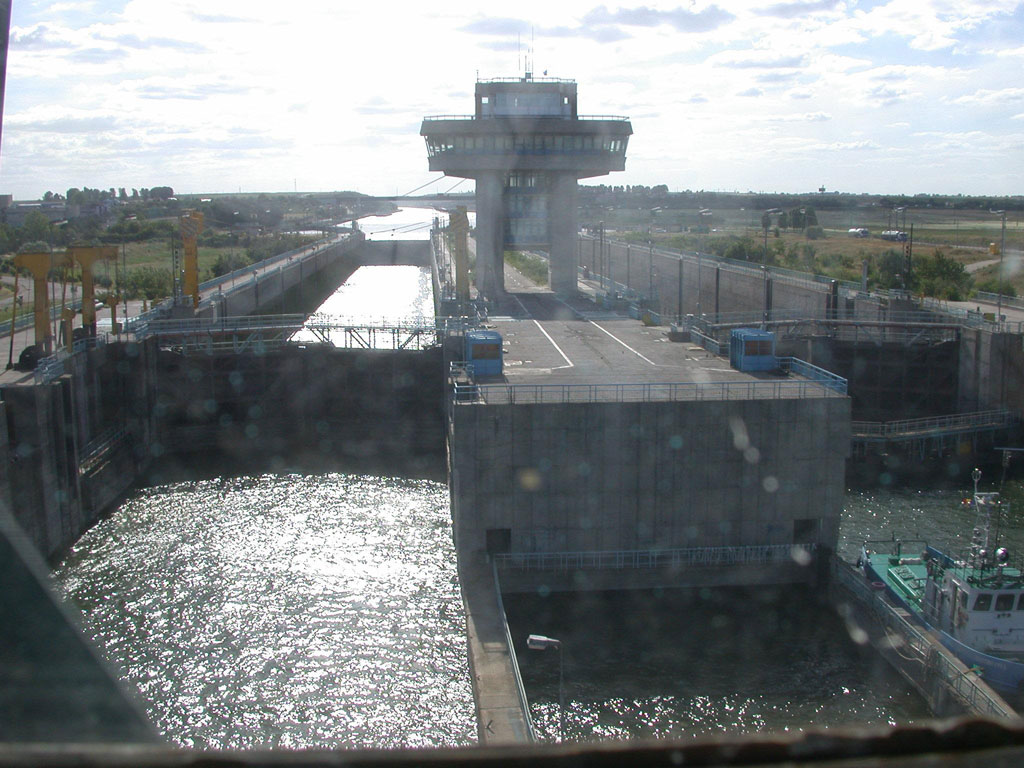
The Agigea lock on the Canal

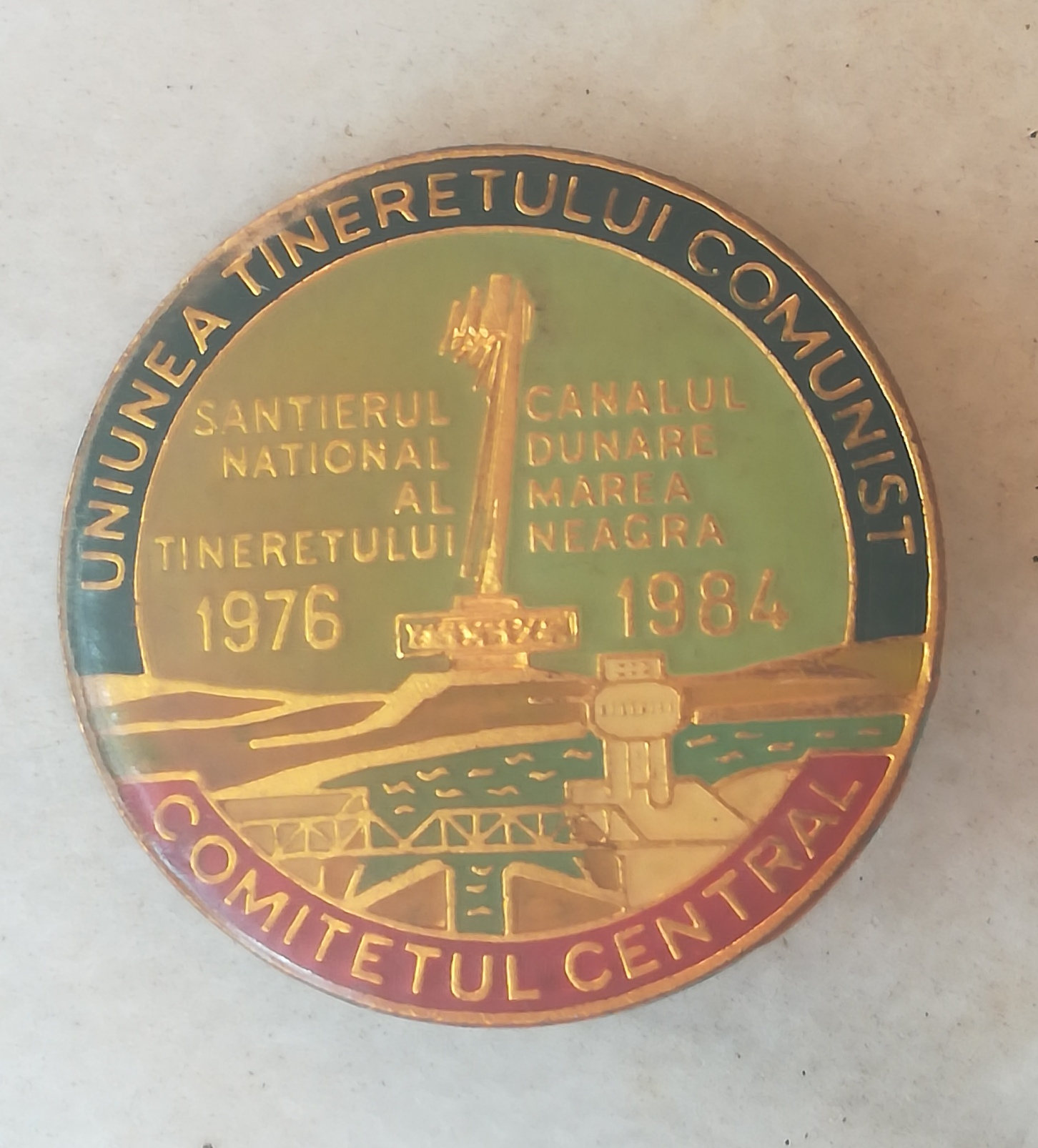
UTC pin for the construction site of the Canal, depicting the Tineretului statue

In June 1973, the project, with a completely new design, was restarted by Nicolae Ceaușescu, who had previously ordered the rehabilitation of people sentenced in the 1952 trial, and who aimed to withdraw the Lower Danube from Soviet control (which had been established by the 1948 Danube Conference). In official propaganda, where the 1950s precedent was no longer mentioned, the canal was referred to as the Blue Highway (Magistrala Albastră).

The general designer of the works of the navigable canal and of the Port of Constanța Sud was the Design Institute of Road, Water and Air Transport (IPTANA) from Bucharest, while the Institute of Hydroelectric Studies and Design (ISPH) designed the works for the Danube and Cernavodă areas. New and large machinery, produced inside Romania, was introduced to the site. The southern arm was completed in May 1984, with the northern arm being inaugurated in October 1987.

The cost of building the canal is estimated to be around 2 billion dollars, and was supposed to be recovered in 50 years. However, as of 2005, it has a yearly income of only a little over 3 million euros.

In 2018, more than 32.9 million tonnes of cargo were carried over the Danube–Black Sea Canal (an increase of 4.7% compared to the previous year).

== In art ==
For much of the 1950s, the Danube–Black Sea Canal was celebrated in agitprop literature (notably, in Geo Bogza's 1950 reportage Începutul epopeii, "The Beginning of the Epic", and in Petru Dumitriu's Drum fără pulbere, "Dustless Road"), music (Leon Klepper's symphonic poem Dunărea se varsă în mare, "The Danube Flows to the Sea"), and film (Ion Bostan's 1951 Canalul Dunăre-Marea Neagră, o construcție a păcii – "The Danube–Black Sea Canal, a Construction of Peace"). During the 1980s, the song "Magistrala Albastră" ("The Blue Freeway"), performed by Dan Spătaru and Mirabela Dauer and using the Canal as its setting, was frequently broadcast in official and semi-official contexts.

During the period of liberalization preceding the July Theses, literature was allowed to make several references to the Canal's penitentiary history. Examples include Marin Preda's Cel mai iubit dintre pământeni and, most likely, Eugen Barbu's Principele (by means of an allegory, set during the 18th century Phanariote rules). In 1973–1974, Ion Cârja, a former prisoner, wrote a book titled Canalul morții ("The Death Canal") detailing his sufferings during incarceration; it was first published in Romania in 1993, after the Revolution of 1989. In György Dragomán's 2005 novel, The White King, set in 1980s Romania, the main protagonist 11-year-old boy's father is deported to a labor camp to work on the Danube–Black Sea Canal.

== Construction personnel ==
=== Inmates of the labor camps ===
This is a partial list of notable inmates of the Danube–Black Sea Canal labor camps; the symbol † indicates those who died there.

- Emanoil Bârzotescu
- Arsenie Boca
- Szilárd Bogdánffy
- Matei Boilă
- Fortunát Boros†
- Ioan Gh. Botez†
- Barbu Brezianu
- Radu Câmpeanu
- George Matei Cantacuzino
- Ion Caraion
- Ion Cârja
- Radu Ciuceanu
- Andrei Ciurunga
- Alexandru Claudian
- Vladimir Constantinescu
- Corneliu Coposu
- Gheorghe Cristescu
- Dimitrie Cuclin
- Constantin Ticu Dumitrescu
- Gheorghe Eminescu
- Constantin Galeriu
- Șerban Ghica
- George Ivașcu
- Pyotr Leshchenko
- Petru Manoliu
- Leonard Mociulschi
- Alexandru Nicolici†
- Emil Pălăngeanu†
- Gherman Pântea
- Ovidiu Papadima
- Aurel Popa
- Pavel Popa
- Ștefan Radof
- Toma Spătaru
- Nicolae Scarlat Stoenescu
- Franț Țandără
- Richard Wurmbrand
- Sabina Wurmbrand

=== Civilian workers ===
The following are otherwise notable figures who worked on the canal as non-conscripted laborers.

- Ilarion Ciobanu
- Jean Constantin

== See also ==
- Danube–Bucharest Canal
- Bystroye Canal
- Cernavodă Nuclear Power Plant
- Mass killings under communist regimes
- Tineretului Statue
