= Vladimir Constantinescu =

Romanian general

Vladimir Constantinescu (19 June 1895 – 1965) was a Romanian brigadier general during World War II.

He was born in Călărași, the son of Captain Hristea Constantinescu and his wife, Eufrosina. After completing elementary school in his native town, he enrolled in 1914 in the Military School for Cavalry Officers in Bucharest, graduating în 1916 with the rank of second lieutenant. During World War I he was promoted to lieutenant in 1917. From 1919 to 1920, Constantinescu pursued his military studies at the Saumur Cavalry School in France. He advanced in rank to captain in 1921 and to major in 1929. From 1928 to 1930 he completed his military training at the Higher War School.

He was promoted to lieutenant colonel in 1936 and to colonel in June 1940. From June 1941 to July 1942, he served as commandant of the Cavalry School and then became commanding officer 8th Roșiori Cavalry Regiment. Constantinescu was sent to the Eastern Front, and led the Vifor Detachment during the Battle of the Caucasus to Novorossiysk. He was awarded the German Iron Cross, 2nd class (1942) and the Order of Michael the Brave, 3rd class (1943).

From October 1942 to December 1943, he served again as commandant of the Cavalry School and then served as chief of staff, Mechanized Troops Command, until July 1944. From July to October 1944, Constantinescu was general officer commanding the 1st Cavalry Division. After Romania switched sides to the Allies in the wake of the 23 August coup d'état, he distinguished himself in the military actions in Transylvania on the Târnava and Mureș rivers, during the Battle of Turda. From December 1944 to May 1945 he served as deputy general officer commanding the 8th Cavalry Division.

Constantinescu was promoted to brigadier general in June 1945. He went into reserve in August 1946 and retired in August 1947. In 1948 he was found guilty of illegal possession of weapons by the communist authorities. Between 30 October 1948 and 11 July 1950, he was imprisoned at Aiud Prison and at the Poarta Albă forced labor colony at the Danube–Black Sea Canal. He died in Bucharest in 1965.
