= Anti-religious campaign in communist Romania =

20th-century Romanian campaign

The anti-religious campaign of communist Romania was initiated by the People's Republic of Romania and continued by the Socialist Republic of Romania, which under the doctrine of Marxist–Leninist atheism took a hostile stance against religion and set its sights on the ultimate goal of an atheistic society wherein religion would be recognized as the ideology of the bourgeoisie.

== Scope ==
Romania's communist government achieved an incredible degree of control (relative to the other Eastern Bloc nations) of the nation's largest religious community: the Romanian Orthodox Church. This control was used to foster political support for the regime as well as to influence Romania's image abroad.

In Romania, more than 5,000 Orthodox Christian priests were imprisoned. The Orthodox archdiocese of Cluj contains biographies of 1,700 church personnel jailed.

== 1945–1965 ==
=== Cultural background ===
The Communist Party of the Soviet Union, in accordance with Marxist–Leninist interpretation of history, saw religion as a capitalist remnant that would inevitably disappear as its social base disappeared.

The Romanian Orthodox Church had a long history of submitting to the rule of foreign rulers, and when the Romanian Communist Party took power after the Soviet Union occupied Romania, the communists used this tradition to their advantage. The Romanian People's Republic was officially installed on December 30, 1947, and the Romanian Orthodox Church found collaboration with the new state to be beneficial to it. This collaboration, led to Romania taking a different path towards anti-religious work than in the Soviet Union, because the regime found the submissive church to be a very effective tool in maintaining power. Therefore, while the state saw religion as something that would not have a permanent place in their future vision for Romania, they nevertheless saw it as a very important tool in the short-term when many Romanians adhered to religious beliefs. Nevertheless, up until 1965, the state made considerable efforts at weakening the church's role in society, abolished previous privileges granted to it and eliminated its educational and charitable activities.

=== Centralizing around the Romanian Orthodox church ===
As a result of Romania's re-enlargement at the end of World War II, with the restitution of Northern Transylvania after the nullification of the Second Vienna Award, non-Orthodox ethnic minorities became more numerous. Rivalries developed in the different religious groups and the government used this to its own advantage by letting the Romanian Orthodox church to strengthen its position in society in exchange for giving greater communist control over the church.

==== Abolishing of the Uniate Eastern Catholic Church ====
In 1948 the government abolished the Uniate Eastern Catholic churches (the second largest religious grouping in Romania, holding 1.5 million people in 1948) and forcibly integrated them into the Romanian Orthodox Church; this followed from a similar measure employed by Joseph Stalin against Ukrainian Catholics in the USSR shortly after the end of the war. The measure was presented as a popular movement that began within the Eastern Rite Catholic Churches (a small group of 37 priests from the Eastern Rite churches signed a document approving the union, all of whom were then excommunicated by the Eastern Rite bishop), and was hailed as bringing freedom to the people in achieving national unity. The Patriarch welcomed the new union and supported the government's decision.

In the first week after this new union was made, six Uniate bishops and 25 Uniate priests were arrested for their opposition to the change. The government initially feared putting them on trial, due to the mass reactions as had followed similar arrests in Bulgaria and Hungary, and instead they were placed under house arrest. They were later moved to the notorious Sighet Prison, wherein more clergy would join them. It is known that 11 Uniate bishops died in prison. The Uniate church was completely outlawed; many of its members that chose not to join the Orthodox Church either continued to operate underground or instead joined the (still legal) Latin Rite Catholics in Romania. All Uniate properties and churches were confiscated and (most of them) handed over to the Orthodox community.

A total of 400 priests in the Eastern Catholic churches were killed by the state. Over 2,000 Eastern Catholic churches were seized (most of which were never returned by the Romanian Orthodox church even after Communism fell).

=== Legal actions taken against the religious institutions ===
The 1927 concordat with the Vatican was abolished, and all Catholic schools were seized by the state. The Vatican was treated as a threat to Romania. Gheorghe Gheorghiu-Dej claimed:

The Pope will undoubtedly find occasion to assail our constitution because it does not tally with the Vatican's tendencies, which are to interfere in the internal concerns of various countries under the pretext of evangelizing the Catholic faithful […] Who knows whether the Vatican will not consider anathematising us on the pretext that our constitution does not provide for the submission of our fellow countrymen of Catholic persuasion to the political interests of the Vatican or because we do not allow ourselves to be tempted by America's golden calf, to the feet of which the Vatican would bring its faithful

Following in the footsteps of the Soviet Union, the regime outlawed institutions of religious education for the general populace. Article 27 of the 1948 Constitution stated:

Freedom of conscience and freedom of religious worship shall be guaranteed by the State. Religious denominations shall be free to organise themselves and may freely function, provided that their ritual and practice are not contrary to the constitution, public security and morals. No religious denomination, congregation, or community may open or maintain institutions for general education, but may only operate special theological schools for training ministers necessary to their religious service under State control. The Romanian Orthodox Church is autocephalous and unitary in its organisation. The method of organisation and the functioning of the religious denominations will be established by law.

The Ministry of Education ordered the removal of religious objects from schools (including many icons), and replaced them with pictures of communist leaders. The anti-religious work in the schools was resisted by parents who did not send their children to the schools at the beginning of the school year and by teachers who defied instructions by asking the students to pray. The Securitate also found that many Communist activists were people of religious belief. The Orthodox church in Romania, in order to make a compromise with the state's anti-religious work, asked for the schools to return the icons to the churches.

In theory, religious denominations were permitted to organize and function, but in practice the regime found many ways to suppress those who threatened 'public security'. Legislation was passed that took control of all aspects of religious life, required all religious denominations to have central organizations that required state approval, forbade the organization of political parties on confessional bases, and that all religious leaders needed to be registered and approved by the government. The Orthodox church was forced to close its seminaries and retained only three institutes for theological instruction, a seminary for monks and two seminaries for nuns; Roman Catholics and Protestants were each allowed one seminary. Government inspectors were designated for the church, and church publications were reduced as well as censored.

The Romanian academy was reorganized and several important religious figures were removed from membership. In 1949, a faction of the Orthodox church known as the 'Army of the Lord' (Oastea Domnului) was outlawed.

=== Appointment of a supportive Orthodox Patriarch ===
The Romanian Orthodox Patriarch, Nicodim, had not opposed the post-war installation of the new regime, however, he had been reticent about the rise of Communism and proved to be an obstacle in the regime's initial attempts at taking control of the church. On February 27, 1948, he died under unexplained circumstances; during the following months when a new Patriarch was to be chosen, Metropolitan Irineu of Moldavia and Bukovina (who was thought to be Nicodim's successor) also died under unexplained circumstances, on April 5, 1948. Metropolitan Justinian Marina, a bishop who had published a new doctrine for the church called the 'Social Apostolate' that forged cooperation between the church and the government, was then named the new Patriarch of the Orthodox Church in Romania. From this point onwards in the history of the People's Republic of Romania, the regime controlled the Patriarchate and ensured that only candidates loyal to them would occupy the post.

The Communists gained complete control of the church, and began persecuting its membership, while the hierarchy turned a blind eye towards this and even cooperated through using its resources to assist the state in its terror campaign against targeted members; the hierarchy denied the existence of persecution. The Communists were permitted to choose who served in the church, who was admitted to seminary and even what the sermon content would be. The national clerical bodies' elections were dominated by the party who imposed its own candidates and filled clerical bodies with people loyal to the party. Priests who were opposed to the Communists were removed (the church hierarchy itself could even dismiss them). The bishops openly criticized the West and praised the political achievements of the Soviet Union; the pastoral letters of Patriarch Justinian often had strong political messages that criticized the West as well as Roman Catholics. A new theology was taught by the church which joined Marxist–Leninist ideology and Orthodox teachings.

These changes in the church were presented to the public eye, not as an attempt by the state to control the church, but rather a popular decision among the nation's Christians to embrace communism.

=== Symbiotic relationship between the Romanian Orthodox church and the state ===
In reward for its complete submission, the Romanian Orthodox church gained many privileges (besides the aforementioned elimination of rival religious groupings in Romania). Unlike in the USSR, wherein clergy were paid only by donations (and taxed at extreme rates), or like in Bulgaria, wherein clergy received a salary from the state at a subsistence level, the clergy in Romania were paid a salary from the government that was equivalent to the average wage of the population. The church also received large public subsidies for the restoring and building of thirty new churches after the end of the War. They did not receive support from orthodox churches in neighbouring countries. The Romanian Orthodox Church was the only religious body in the Eastern bloc that freely published significant amounts of religious and liturgical works, as well as translations from western books. Patriarch Justinian became a visible public figure, not in competition with but in submission to the system, and he served as a guest at state diplomatic receptions. The government permitted the Orthodox church to canonize the first Romanian Orthodox saints in 1955.

Despite this good relationship, the regime also attempted to indoctrinate the population (especially the youth) with atheism. Students were forced to attend special Scouts assemblies that coincided with religious festivals. On the feast of Christ's baptism in 1948 (traditionally celebrated in Romania by the Orthodox Patriarch to bless the Monarch and his Queen for the next year), over 170,000 'volunteers' were sent to work on national building sites in celebration of the working class. In 1949, an anti-religious organization based on Soviet models was formed, which was called the Society for the Popularisation of Science and Culture. Its goal was to 'propagate among the labouring masses political and scientific knowledge to fight obscurantism, superstition, mysticism, and all other influences of bourgeois ideologies'. Leading communist intellectuals joined this society; it was organized into regional organizations and branches around the country and recruited thousands of propagandists to give lectures around the country.

The Securitate found a great chasm had developed between the church hierarchy and laity. The laity were subject to poor economic conditions and anti-religious persecution, while their hierarchy enjoyed very good relations with the state. The children of Gheorghiu-Dej even went often to Patriarch Justinian's home to be treated with sumptuous meals.

Monasteries were required to take roles as craft centres (Justinian reformed monasticism so that every monk or nun would have a useful trade so that monasticism would not be regarded as an anachronism) and future monks/nuns were required to have at least 7 years education. Monasteries were later suppressed in the late 1950s. A waves of closures of monastic seminaries and monasteries took place between 1958 and 1964 (coinciding with Nikita Khrushchev's accelerated anti-religious campaign in the same period). About 4,000 monks and nuns were either jailed or forced to 'return to the world'.

=== Church lands and the Land reform ===
Land reform was undertaken in Romania according to the Soviet model of collectivization; as in other Communist states, the government wished to deprive the church of its land, because the church was a major land owner in the country. The Romanian Government was very cautious to avoid acting in a confrontational manner on this issue, and therefore it arranged it such that priests went on an individual basis to publicly state that they could not work the land and because they wished to support the Communist transformation of Romania, they were therefore freely giving their land to the people. The Patriarch applauded the measure, and called on the peasantry to follow suit by giving up their land to collectivization.

In his pastoral letter on collectivization, the Patriarch applauded the 'high' level of religious freedom present in Romania, wherein the state not only guaranteed but 'defended' the church, and he denounced the previous concordat in Romania that had brought injustice to the church.

=== Persecution ===
In 1961, Gheorghe Gheorghiu-Dej, leader of Communist Romania, declared that over 80,000 people were arrested between 1945 and 1952, of which 30,000 were imprisoned. This included many members of the clergy and ordinary lay people that were convicted after they asserted their religious beliefs. The Eastern Orthodox nevertheless did not suffer mass persecution, and the church even benefited from collaboration with the regime.

Following the 1949 social re-orientation programs, many priests deemed "reactionary" by the state were arrested.

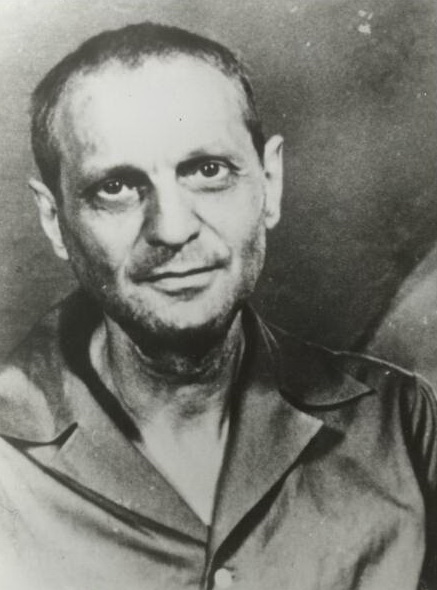
Christian pastor and professor Richard Wurmbrand was imprisoned and tortured for 14 years for his faith.

Imprisoned believers could be subject to atheistic brainwashing classes in prison. Richard Wurmbrand, a Lutheran pastor in Romania, famously escaped to the West in the 1960s after fourteen years in prison, where he testified before the United States Congress and gave detailed accounts of the torture he and others underwent in prison. He spoke on brainwashing:

Now the worst times came; the times of brain-washing. Those who have not passed through brain-washing can't understand what torture it is. From 5 in the morning until 10 in the evening… 17 hours a day… we had to sit just like this [he sat straight looking forward]. We were not allowed to lean. For nothing in the world could we rest a little bit-our head. To close you eyes was a crime! From 5 in the morning until 10 in the evening we had to sit like this and hear: 'Communism is good. Communism is good. Communism is good. Communism is good. Communism is good. Christianity is stupid! Christianity is stupid! Christianity is stupid! Nobody more believes in Christ. Nobody more believes in Christ. Give up! Give up! Give up!' For days, weeks, years, we had to listen to these things.

Clergy were required to enroll in state classes (known as "missionary courses") meant to indoctrinate them. They were required to pass final exams in these courses in order to serve as priests, and their grades determined which parish they would be sent to (i.e., better grades would lead them to better parishes; the priest's pay was also different depending on what part of the country they were in). After graduation they were also required to attend conferences every year involving both religious and political themes (after three absences, their positions were revoked); cantors in the church were also required to attend similar conferences. Conference political themes included such topics as 'The Church Should not be Static', 'The Orthodox Church and the Russian Orthodox Church, 'The Vatican's Anti-Progressivism', 'The Catholic Problem in the People's Republic of Romania' and 'Religious Liberty in the People's Republic of Romania'.

The Patriarch had some success in using his good relations with the regime, to some degree, shield the church from persecution. He also on one occasion defended the Saint Leon church in Bucharest from demolition.

=== International role ===
Beginning in the 1960s, the state began to increasingly use the Romanian Orthodox church for an international role. It used the church to make contacts with western Christians in order to present a better image of Romania abroad. It especially focused on developing relations with the Church of England, which had been fostering contact with Romania since the inter-war period. The Anglican church gave much support to the Romanian Orthodox church, especially after the election of Michael Ramsey as Archbishop of Canterbury in 1961.

The patriarch tried to convince an Anglican representing the World Council of Churches that they were paying too much attention to the matter of the closure of monasteries, and claimed that the church was looking after the monks. Not long after, the Romanian Orthodox church was accepted into membership in the World Council of Churches. The church was used abroad to support Romania's image, while at the same time within the country the people would face continual atheistic propaganda.

The Romanian Orthodox church in the United States split between those that continued to recognize the authority of the Holy Synod in Bucharest and those that didn't. The regime used this power to influence the activities of the Romanian diaspora where political opposition was harder to control. In 1963, when the bishop for the Romanian Orthodox in the United States died, a new bishop was appointed but could not take up residence as a result of him being denied a visa.

Vasile Lăzărescu, Archbishop of Timișoara and Metropolitan of Banat, was found to be helping families of some imprisoned priests, and (following direction from the state) he was therefore accused by the church hierarchy of embezzlement and retired to a monastery in 1961.

When the Second Vatican Council was opened in 1962, the Romanian Orthodox Church was the only church in the communist bloc that refused to send representatives, and the pope was criticized. The Romanian church also refused to participate at the contemporary historic meeting between the Pope and Ecumenical Patriarch.

In 1963, the Society for the Dissemination of Science and Culture (an organization meant to promote atheism) published brochures against religion: 'Adam and Eve our Ancestors?', 'When and Why Did Religion Appear?', 'The Origin of Christianity', 'Anthology of Atheism in Romania' and 'The Bible in Pictures'. The work by the French atheist Léo Taxil, 'La Bible amusante', was also translated into Romanian and published.

Romania's leader, Gheorghiu-Dej, told the Austrian ambassador in 1964:

…as long as the church has no political power and the state has full control of the education of the young I am not against religion.

In 1965, after Khrushchev had strongly attacked the church in Russia for several years, the number of priests in Moscow (with a population of 7 million) was only 45, while in Bucharest (with a population of 1.5 million), due to the continued cooperation and favoured treatment by the regime, there were 430 priests.

The state continued to try to present a positive image of itself internationally, by using religious bodies as tools. In 1965, the regime allowed (for the first time since 1945) a superior of a Catholic order (specifically the Superior of the Salvatorian Fathers) to visit Romania. The Archbishop of Canterbury also visited Romania in June 1965, and met with high-ranking members of the Communist government as well as the Patriarch (he was also given a special dinner by the Department of Religious Confessions). When the Archbishop asked about the government's attitudes to religious minority, the chairman of the council of ministers responded that England had set a historical precedent

to prevent a foreign ecclesiastical ruler interfering in the national affairs

(the largest religious minority in Romania were Catholics, of which only the Latin-rite Catholics still existed, due to the state's liquidation of the eastern-rite Catholics). Archbishop Ramsay, wishing to please the regime, praised the country's economic achievements; he also declined to criticize abuses of religious freedom or the atheist propaganda.

== 1965–1989 ==
=== Rehabilitation under Ceaușescu ===
When Nicolae Ceaușescu (coming to power in 1965) gained increasing control, the only religious bodies that provided significant dissent to the regime were Evangelical Protestants, who formed only a small portion of the population.

Ceaușescu formed personal working relationships with the leaders of all religious bodies in Romania after coming to power.

The visit of the Archbishop of Canterbury, achieved through Patriarch Justinian's efforts, as well as the increased attention on the religious situation in Romania from the visit, forced the regime to blunt anti-religious activities against the church until Justinian's death in 1977. It ceased to close monasteries, agreed to rehabilitate some formerly imprisoned clergy, and gave financial support for the restoration of some churches of historical importance.

Abortion was outlawed in 1966 (on grounds of the need to achieve demographic targets) and remained so until the country's democratization following the fall of communism; this contrasted from other Communist states wherein abortion was legalized (even if economic logic pointed at a need for a larger workforce) and even used as an ideological weapon against churches. 300 new churches were allowed to be built.

Ceaușescu used the church for his nationalistic efforts at separating Romania from Moscow. In 1972 he allowed his father to be buried with Orthodox rites and broadcast on live radio while also tacitly tolerating the use of Orthodox baptisms, marriages, and funerals by communist officials who were also believers. He also gave extensive financial subsidies to all churches and exempted clergy as well as seminarians from military service. Churches were also permitted to operate huge network of sunday schools.

=== Patriarchs ===
In May 1974, Justinian brought the church into the Front of Socialist Unity and Democracy, a nationalist body controlled by the party.

After Justinian's death in 1977, a new anti-church campaign began in Romania. This coincided with an earthquake that struck southern Romania as well as Bucharest in the same year, which then led to urban renewals projects that included the demolition of churches. The succeeding patriarch continued to praise Ceaușescu's leadership and the religious freedom granted to the people of Romania.

Father Gheorghe Calciu-Dumitreasa, was sentenced in 1979 to prison and later sent into exile for preaching sermons against atheism. Patriarch Justin Moisescu (Justinian's successor) allowed the Holy Synod to defrock Dumitreasa and other priests that the state arrested. Between 1977 and 1982, 22 churches and monasteries were demolished, and 14 others were closed down or moved to disadvantageous sites.

Romanian Orthodox priests in the west were defrocked by the church in Romania for criticizing the situation of the church in Romania.

Some religious revival occurred in Romania in the 1980s and engaged in more open religious practices, which the authorities tolerated. This toleration was accompanied by ruthless repression, with charismatic religious leaders subject to harassment, imprisonment and forced emigration (and also potentially killed). Religious congregations that were becoming larger in this revival had great difficulties in trying to enlarge their facilities, and some attempted to do so without permission with the government responding by tearing down the new construction. Printing and importing bibles was very difficult, and reportedly Bibles could be pulped for making toilet paper.

Ceausescu re-developed Bucharest from his coming to power until his fall. Ceaușescu did not like to see church architecture in Bucharest, and therefore eighteen churches and monasteries in the city (including Sfânta Vineri, a 17th-century monument) were destroyed as part of the city's redevelopment. Other churches in the city were moved in order to make them less visibly prominent, and other construction was placed around them which concealed their structures from view. The 18th century Vacaresti monastery was destroyed in 1986. Patriarch Teoctist Arăpașu (the successor of Patriarch Justin), tried to struggle against Ceaușescu's desire to demolish the Patriarchal palace in Bucharest and transfer the Patriarch to the northeastern town of Iasi. The demolition of churches increased after Teoctist became Patriarch.

In 1986, Metropolitan Antonie Plămădeală defended Ceaușescu's church demolition program as part of the need for urbanization and modernization in Romania. The church hierarchy refused to try to inform the international community about what was happening.

=== Dissent ===
Widespread dissent from religious groups in Romania did not appear until revolution was sweeping across Eastern Europe in 1989. Patriarch Teoctist of the Romanian Orthodox Church supported Ceaușescu up until the end of the regime, and even congratulated him after the state murdered one hundred demonstrators in Timișoara. It was not until the day before Ceaușescu's execution on December 24, 1989, that the Patriarch condemned him as "a new child-murdering Herod".

Following the removal of Communism, the Patriarch resigned (only to return a few months after) and the holy synod apologized for those 'who did not have the courage of the martyrs'.

== See also ==
- Anti-religious campaign during the Russian Civil War (1917–1921)
- League of Militant Atheists
- Persecution of Christians in Warsaw Pact countries
- Polish anti-religious campaign (1945–1989)
- USSR anti-religious campaign (1921–1928)
- USSR anti-religious campaign (1928–1941)
- USSR anti-religious campaign (1958–1964)
- USSR anti-religious campaign (1970s–1987)
