= Costache Ioanid =

Romanian poet and songwriter

Costache Ioanid (Romanian pronunciation: [kosˈtake i.o̯aˈnid]; 3 December 1912 – 26 November 1987) was a Romanian artist and poet, author of Romanian Christian poems. He wrote many poems that are used all over Romania today, and is one of the best known Christian poets in Romania.

== Biography ==
Costache was born on December 3, 1912, in Comandaresti, North Bukovina and was the fourth son of Titus and Ecaterina.

Beginning his educational life in 1923 at the "Liceul Internat" high school in Iasi, Ioanid went on to study at the Academy of Dramatic Arts from 1929 to 1934, graduating with top honors. During this period, he showcased his artistic versatility with the inaugural exhibition of sculpture caricature, exploring mediums such as clay, oil painting, glass, wax, paper, and wood.

From 1934 to 1952, Ioanid organized seven exhibitions in Iasi and later in Bucharest. His move to Bucharest in 1938 marked the beginning of his renowned "nonpolitical Ballet," even performing for King Charles II. In 1939, he married Elena Stefanescu in Iasi.

A transformative moment occurred in 1940 when Ioanid, reading the Bible in a park, caught the attention of Mihai and Sabina Wurmbrand. Invited to Richard Wurmbrand's Lutheran Church, Ioanid deepened his study of the Bible, leading to the creation of his initial Christian poems.

During 1941–1944, Ioanid worked as a Cartographer at the General Staff. Living off painting from 1958 to 1961, he attended the Pentecostal Church on Calea Mosilor. Despite the illegal circulation of his writings nationwide, Ioanid steadfastly refused to conform to communist propaganda.

From 1961 to 1966, he worked as a technical illustrator at IPROMET. In 1963, Ioanid faced arrest at Malmaison and underwent a year-long investigation. By 1966, he found solace in the Lutheran church, earning recognition as a leading Christian poet alongside Traian Dorz and others.

== Personal life ==
Tragedy struck in 1981 with the passing of his wife, Elena. That same year, Ioanid immigrated to the United States, publishing the first volume of his poetry, "Taine" (Mysteries).

He died on November 26, 1987 in Portland, Oregon.
