= Ion Cârja =

American activist (1922 - 1977)

Ion Cârja (sometimes spelled Cârjă or Cârje) (March 25, 1922 – May 8, 1977) was a Romanian and American writer and anti-communist activist, who was a political prisoner in Communist Romania.

== Biography ==
Cârja was born in Whitman, Logan County, West Virginia, where his parents (Iov and Judifca) had emigrated to from Austro-Hungarian-ruled Transylvania around 1910. He and his family returned to Romania in February 1927 and settled down in Mihai Viteazu, near the city of Cluj, where they bought a farm. While in high school, Cârja started work on a magazine titled Gazeta de Turda, and published his first book — Cremene în apa vremii ("A Flintstone in the Water of Life").

Beginning in 1942, he studied Law and Philology at the University of Cluj (he also enlisted for Medicine studies, but abandoned them after one year). In 1948 he received his PhD in Law from the same university. He was elected general secretary of the Transylvanian Writers' Union.

At the same time, Cârja took part in the resistance movement against the newly established Communist regime, and was involved in supporting the anti-communist groups in the Apuseni Mountains. Because of this and due to the political content of his writings, he spent 15 years in prison between 1949 and 1964 (in Cluj, Gherla, Aiud, and building the Danube–Black Sea Canal). He was ultimately released by a general amnesty. In parallel, his elder brother, Nicolae Cârja, was captured by the Soviet Red Army, and exiled for nine years in the Russian Far East.

Having both American and Romanian citizenship, Ion Cârja made several requests to the Romanian authorities to be allowed to leave for the United States. Pressure by the United States Department of State ultimately brought about his departure in May 1965. He settled down in New York City, where he worked for the city's Department of Social Welfare. In order to receive more qualifications in this area, he undertook studies at Fordham University. Columbia University later recognized his Romanian PhD.

In 1970 he initiated the Romanian National Council, whose journal, called Acțiunea Românească, was first published in 1971. He was elected secretary general of the council.

== Published books ==
- Cremene în apa vremii
- Întoarcerea din infern (2 vols.), Madrid: Dacia and New-York: Acțiunea Românească, 1969. OCLC 2983157
- Canalul morții, Bucharest: Cartea Românească, 1993. ISBN 973-23-0400-6
