= Port of Cernavodă =

Location
- Country: Romania
- Location: Constanța County

Details
- Owned by: Administrația Porturilor Dunării Fluviale
- Type of harbour: Natural/Artificial
- Size: 127,000 square metres (12.7 ha)
- No. of berths: 2
- General manager: Dănuț Ofițeru

Statistics
- Annual cargo tonnage: 500,000 tonnes (2008)
- Website; Official site

The Port of Cernavodă, in the city of Cernavodă on the Danube River, is one of the largest Romanian river ports.
