= Cuza Vodă, Constanța =

Cuza Vodă
- Commune
- Coat of arms

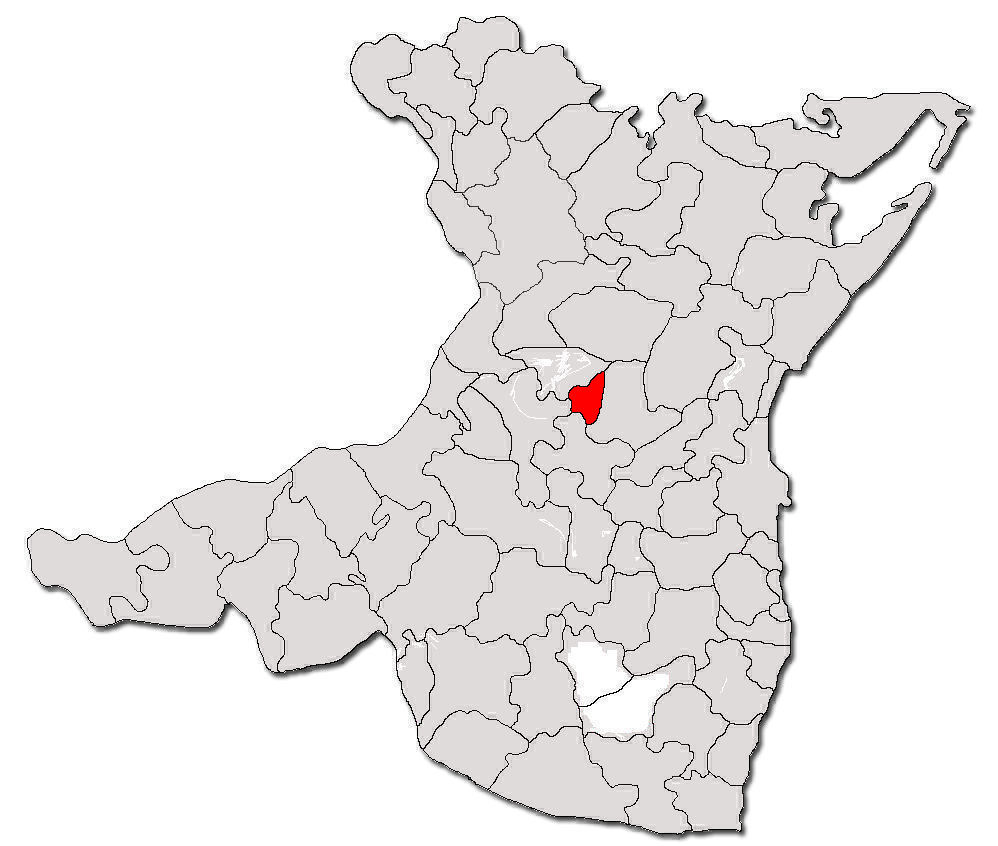
- Location in Constanța County

- Location in Romania
- Coordinates: 44°18′N 28°19′E
- Country: Romania
- County: Constanța

Government
  - Mayor (2020–2024): Viorel Dulgheru (PNL)
- Area: 53.22 km^{2} (20.55 sq mi)
- Population (2021-12-01): 4,116
  - Density: 77.34/km^{2} (200.3/sq mi)
- Time zone: UTC+02:00 (EET)
  - Summer (DST): UTC+03:00 (EEST)
- Vehicle reg.: CT
- Website: www.cuza-voda.ro

Cuza Vodă (Romanian pronunciation: [ˈkuza ˈvodə]) is a commune in Constanța County, Northern Dobruja, Romania.

The commune includes one village: Cuza Vodă (historical name: Docuzol, Turkish: Dokuz Oğul) - named after the Romanian Domnitor Alexandru Ioan Cuza.

== Demographics ==
At the 2011 census, Cuza Vodă had 2,557 Romanians (76.10%), 800 Roma (23.81%), 3 others (0.09%).
