= Cumpăna =

- Commune
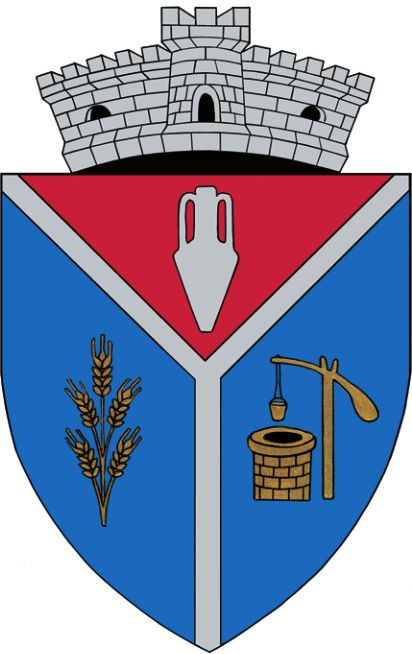
- Coat of arms

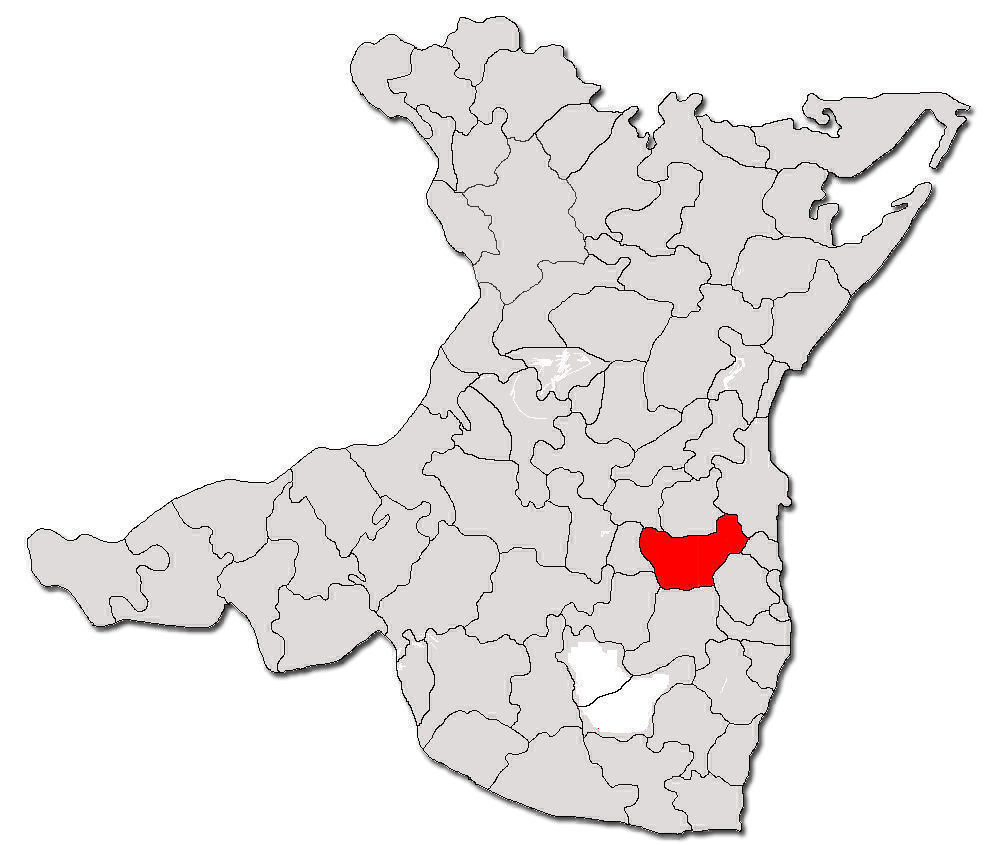
- Location in Constanța County

- Location in Romania
- Coordinates: 44°6′46″N 28°33′21″E
- Country: Romania
- County: Constanța

Government
  - Mayor (2020–2024): Mariana Gâju (PSD)
- Area: 50.64 km^{2} (19.55 sq mi)
- Population (2021-12-01): 14,757
  - Density: 291.4/km^{2} (754.7/sq mi)
- Time zone: UTC+02:00 (EET)
  - Summer (DST): UTC+03:00 (EEST)
- Vehicle reg.: CT
- Website: www.primaria-cumpana.ro

Cumpăna (Romanian pronunciation: [ˈkumpəna]) is a commune in Constanța County, Northern Dobruja, Romania.

== Administration ==
The commune includes the village with the same name, Cumpăna (historical name: Hașiduluc, Turkish: Haşiduluk). The village was mentioned under the name Hașiduluc for the first time in 1870 by Ion Ionescu de la Brad in his work "Excursion agricole dans la plaine de la Dobroudja". It was renamed to Cumpăna in 1926.

Although still mentioned in the official documents as part of the Cumpăna commune, the village of Straja (historical name: Mahometcea, Turkish: Mehmedçay) was abandoned to make way for the Danube-Black Sea Canal and its population moved to Cumpăna.

== Demographics ==
At the 2021 census Cumpăna had a population of 14,757 with a majority of Romanians (81.89%) and minorities of Turks (2.57%), Roma (2.17%), Tatars (1%), Lipovans (0.05%), Hungarians (0.04%), Bulgarians (0.02%), others (0.23%) and unknown (12.03%).

At the 2011 census, Cumpăna had 10,732 Romanians (92.06%), 5 Hungarians (0.04%), 210 Roma (1.80%), 7 Germans (0.06%), 510 Turks (4.37%), 168 Tatars (1.44%), 5 Lipovans (0.04%), 21 others (0.18%).

== Latest developments ==
In the past few years, Cumpăna has become a favourite residential area for the people leaving the crowded city of Constanța. Recent developments like sewage, natural gas pipeline grid and proximity to new major hypermarkets accelerated that process. In Cumpăna there are two Orthodox churches, one of which was renovated in 2007, and one Pentecostal Christian church founded in 1991.

In 2007, Cumpăna was awarded the honorary title "European Village" by the European Union delegation in Romania.

== Natives ==
- Marcel Toader
