= Sabina Wurmbrand =

Romanian missionary (1913–2000)

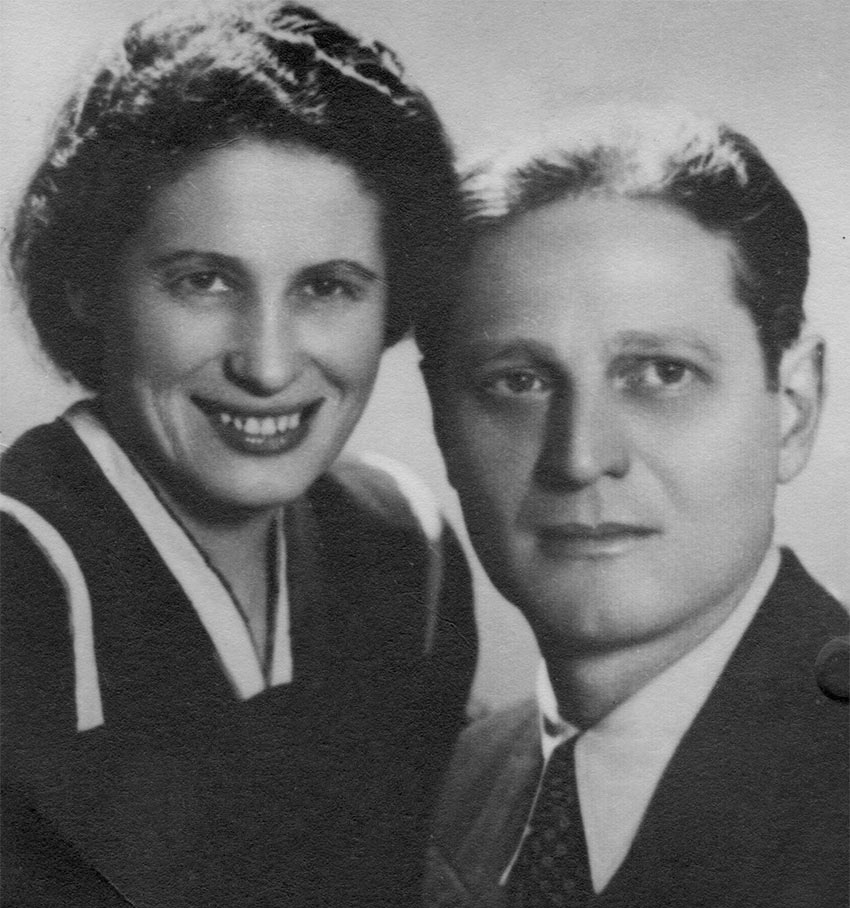
- Sabina (left) and Richard Wurmbrand in 1930
- Born: Sabina Oster; 10 July 1913; Czernowitz, Austria-Hungary
- Died: 20 August 2000 (aged 87); Tijuana, Baja California, Mexico
- Citizenship: Romania
- Occupations: Human rights activist Missionary
- Years active: 1938–2000
- Spouse(s): Richard Wurmbrand (m. 1936; her death, 2000)
- Children: 1

Sabina Wurmbrand (née Oster; 10 July 1913 – 20 August 2000) was a Romanian missionary and human rights activist. The wife of the evangelical Lutheran priest Richard Wurmbrand, she and her husband became missionaries after converting from Judaism to Christianity in 1938. After experiencing persecution in Romania following the adoption of communism in 1946, both Wurmbrand and her husband were sent to gulags; while Wurmbrand was released in 1951, her husband was not released until 1964, following which they fled Romania, eventually settling in the United States and establishing the Voice of the Martyrs, a non-governmental organisation that aided Christians experiencing persecution around the world.

== Early life ==
Wurmbrand was born on 10 July 1913 in Czernowitz in what was then the Duchy of Bukovina within Austria-Hungary which was subsequently annexed by the Kingdom of Romania in 1919. She was born into an observant Jewish family; at that time, Czernowitz was a centre of Jewish education and culture. Wurmbrand moved to Paris, France, for two years as a young adult, where she studied languages at Sorbonne University.

Upon returning to Romania, Wurmbrand moved to Bucharest, where she first met Richard Wurmbrand, a fellow Romanian Jew who at that time was a communist and an agent for Communist International. The two married in 1936, and had a son, Mihai, in 1941. Mihai, who went by the name Michael, died on 17 October 2026 at the age of 87.

== Conversion and missionary work ==
In 1938, Wurmbrand and her husband converted to Protestantism, a branch of Christianity. Differing accounts have been given as to the cause for the conversion; one said that the two converted after being influenced by Isaac Feinstein, a Romanian missionary who had similarly converted from Judaism, while another stated they did so after being given a Bible by a carpenter while on holiday in the Carpathian Mountains. After converting, Wurmbrand and her husband became members of the Anglican Church in Bucharest; Richard Wurmbrand trained as an Anglican priest, and he and his wife joined the Church's Ministry Among Jewish People. The Wurmbrands went on to establish their own church, the Jewish-Christian Church in Bucharest, which at its peak had over a thousand members, primarily Jews who had converted to various Christian denominations.

Following the outbreak of World War II, Wurmbrand and her husband continued with their missionary work while also offering practical support, including rescuing and concealing several Jewish children from ghettos and teaching in bomb shelters. During the Holocaust, that occurred in Romania following its occupation by Germany between 1940 and 1943, Wurmbrand's parents and siblings were all murdered in concentration camps; while the Wurmbrands were considered Jewish under Nazi racial ideology, it has been suggested that they were saved from being sent to concentration camps themselves due to their conversion to Christianity and subsequent links with prominent and influential Christians in Romania.

== Persecution and imprisonment ==
The Soviet occupation of Romania in 1944 saw a significant presence of Soviet soldiers in the country and culminated with the establishment of the Socialist Republic of Romania, a communist state, in 1947. As a result, the country became officially atheist; while the new constitution guaranteed religious freedom, in practice the regime promoted Marxist–Leninist atheism while persecuting religious groups. Wurmbrand and her husband continued to work as missionaries; following the war, they had converted to Lutheranism, and Richard had retrained as a Lutheran priest. They helped conceal Christians of all denominations who were being persecuted by the state. Wurmbrand often performed speeches in her own right in the Christian underground scene, and distributed Christian literature to soldiers from the Red Army, which led to her being arrested on several occasions

Wurmbrand also frequently visited Budapest, where she smuggled in goods and foods for refugees living there. During a drought in 1946, Wurmbrand organised a soup kitchen in Bucharest, which fed over a thousand people a day. Between 1946 and 1948, Wurmbrand played a key role in organising Christian camps for religious leaders from different denominations, and conducted street meetings.

On 29 February 1948, Richard Wurmbrand was arrested, and he was subsequently sent to various gulags over the next fourteen years. In 1951, Wurmbrand herself was sent to a gulag on the Danube–Black Sea Canal for three years; during this time, her son Mihai lived with a family friend. Wurmbrand was conditionally released in 1954 as part of the post-Stalin amnesty following his death the previous year, though she remained subject to house arrest for several years afterwards. Wurmbrand's husband was not released until 1964, and during that time, members of the secret police disguised as released prisoners informed Wurmbrand that her husband had died and that they had attended his funeral.

== Emigration to the United States and subsequent activism ==
Richard Wurmbrand was released from prison in 1964. After being supported by different Christian groups to pay a $10, 000 ransom, the Wurmbrands were able to leave Romania; after first staying in Norway and the United Kingdom, they eventually settled in California in the United States. In 1967, her husband wrote Tortured for Christ, which made him a well-known figure in the Christian world for his reporting on the religious persecution of Christians in communist countries, as well as due to his public speeches in which he notably stated that communism was not compatible with Christianity. In 1967, the Wurmbrands established Jesus to the Communist World, a missionary organised based in California with a focus on completing missionary work in communist countries. Its international organ, the Voice of the Martyrs, was vocally anti-communist in nature.

In 1970, Wurmbrand published her own book, The Pastor's Wife, in which she detailed her own experiences of repression in Romania, and put forward her theology on the "indomitable spirit and strength" of Christians experiencing persecution.

In 1992, Wurmbrand and her husband returned to Romania for the first time since they left, following the collapse of the communist regime in 1989.

== Death and commemoration ==
Wurmbrand died of liver cancer in Tijuana, Mexico, on 20 August 2000 at the age of 87. In an obituary in The Guardian, Wurmbrand was described as a "moderating influence" over her husband, while staying out of his various controversies; it stated that she "deserved a wider reputation... as one of those who most objectively exposed the repression in communist Romania".

A film about Wurmbrand's life, Sabina: Tortured for Christ – The Nazi Years, was released in 2021, and won the Best Feature Film category at the 2021 Christian Worldview Film Festival.
