= Castelu =

- Commune
- Coat of arms

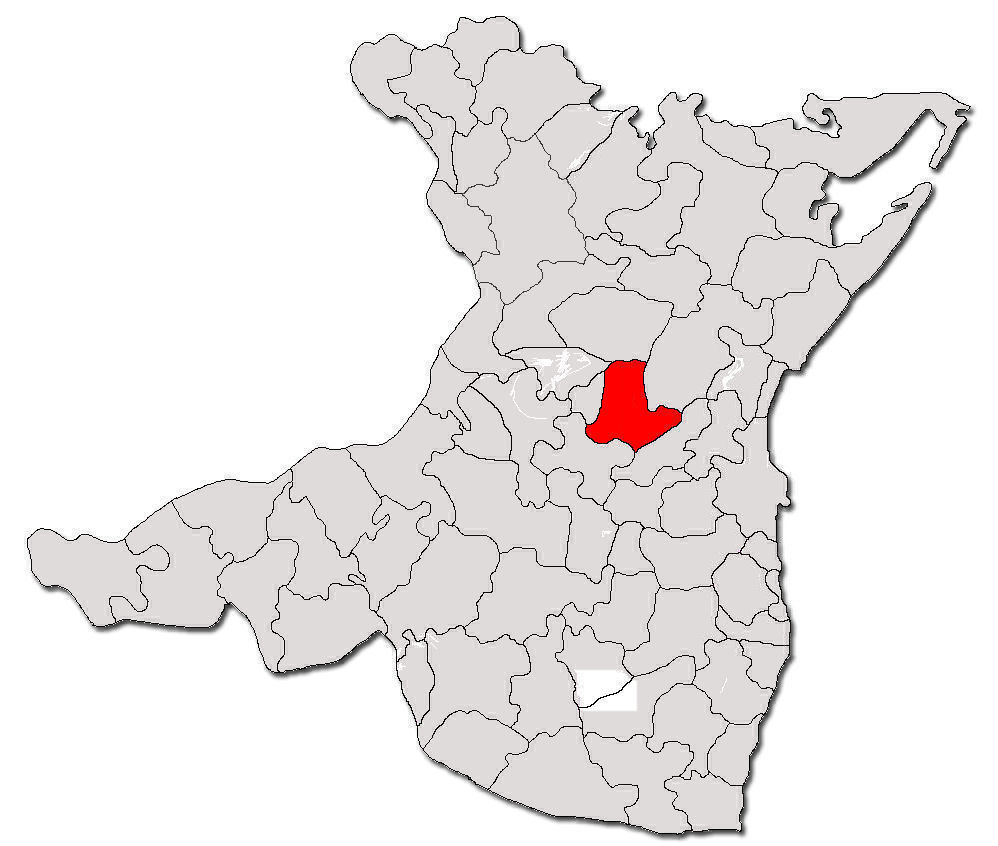
- Location in Constanța County

- Location in Romania
- Coordinates: 44°15′N 28°20′E
- Country: Romania
- County: Constanța
- Subdivisions: Castelu, Nisipari

Government
  - Mayor (2020–2024): Nicolae Anghel (PMP)
- Area: 52.80 km^{2} (20.39 sq mi)
- Elevation: 15 m (49 ft)
- Population (2021-12-01): 5,241
  - Density: 99.26/km^{2} (257.1/sq mi)
- Time zone: UTC+02:00 (EET)
  - Summer (DST): UTC+03:00 (EEST)
- Postal code: 907040
- Area code: +40 x41
- Vehicle reg.: CT
- Website: www.primaria-castelu.ro

Castelu (Romanian pronunciation: [kaˈstelu]) is a commune in Constanța County, Northern Dobruja, Romania.

The commune includes two villages:

- Castelu (historical name: Chiostel, Turkish: Köstel)
- Nisipari (historical name: Caratai, Turkish: Karatay, German: Karatai)

Castelu is located in the central part of the county, along the Danube–Black Sea Canal.

== Demographics ==
At the 2011 census, Castelu had 3,453 Romanians (77.08%), 340 Roma (7.59%), 509 Turks (11.36%), 165 Tatars (3.68%), 6 Aromanians (0.13%), 7 others (0.16%).

== Gallery ==
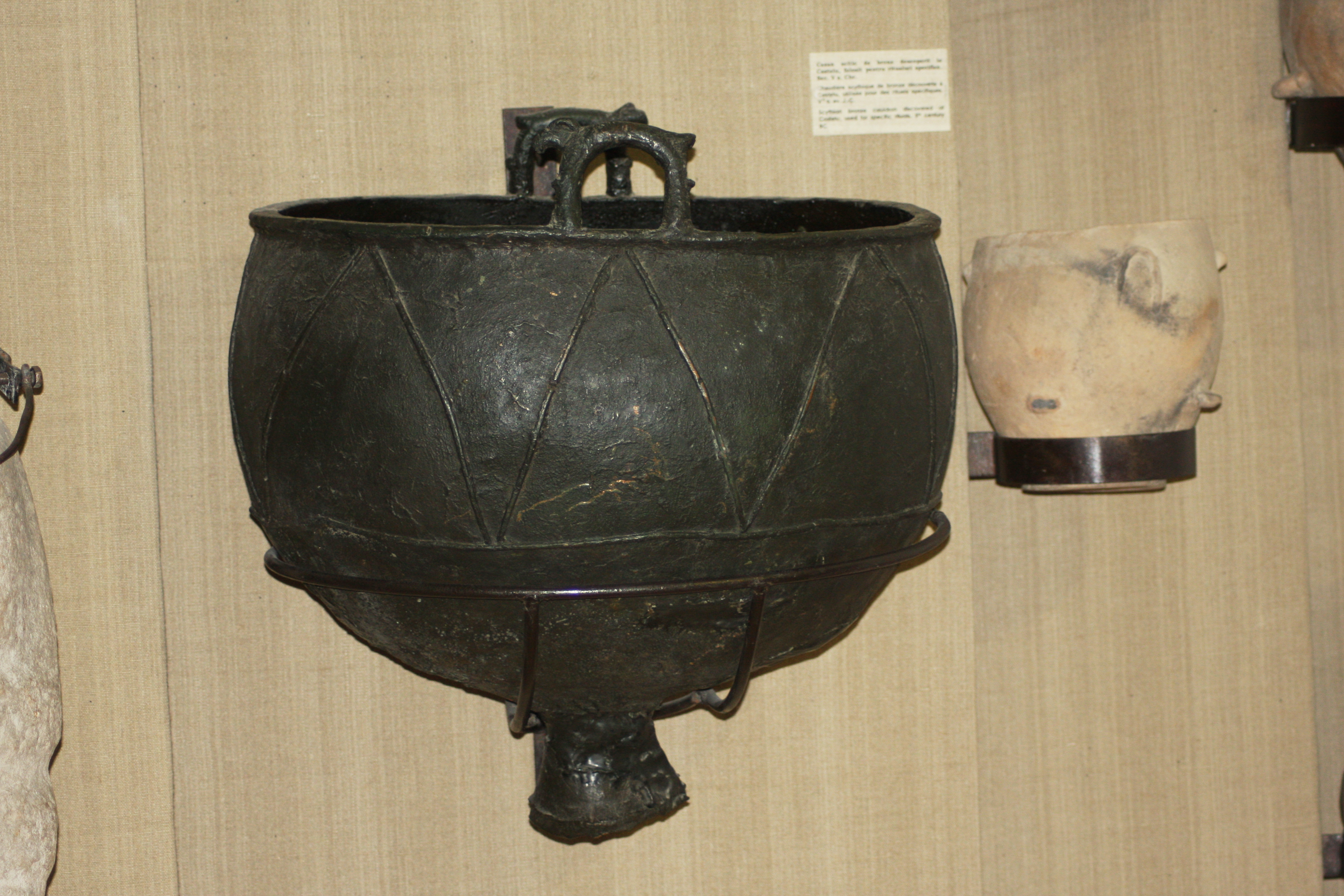
Scythian bowl, 5th century BC, found at Castelu. In display at the Museum of National History in Constanța
