= Richard Wurmbrand =

Romanian Lutheran priest (1909–2001)

The Reverend Richard Wurmbrand
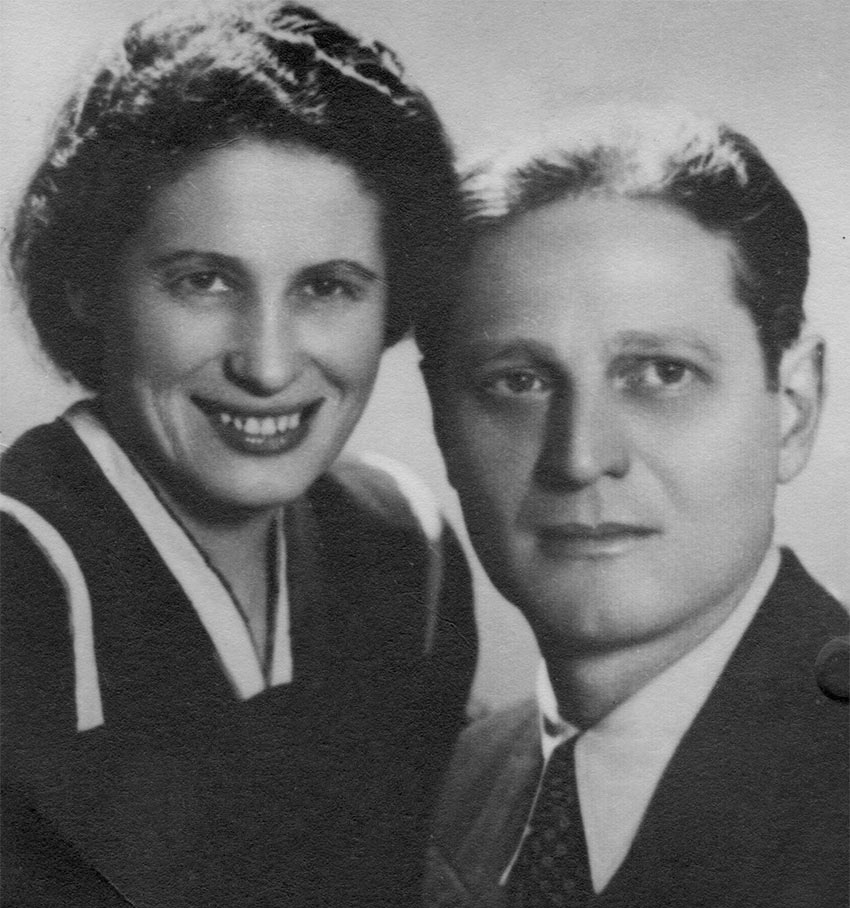
- Richard and Sabina Wurmbrand
- Born: 24 March 1909; Bucharest, Romania
- Died: 17 February 2001 (aged 91); Torrance, California, United States
- Occupations: Priest, professor
- Spouse(s): Sabina Ostler (m. 1936; her death, 2000)

Ecclesiastical career
- Church: Church of England (1938-1940); Church of Norway (1940-1944); Lutheran Church of Romania (1944-1948)
- Writings: Tortured for Christ and others

Richard Wurmbrand (24 March 1909 – 17 February 2001), also known as Nicolai Ionescu, was a Romanian Evangelical-Lutheran priest, and professor of Jewish descent. In 1948, having become a Christian ten years before, he publicly said Communism and Christianity were incompatible. Wurmbrand preached at bomb shelters and rescued Jews during World War II. He experienced imprisonment and torture by the Communist regime of Romania, which maintained a policy of state atheism.

After serving a total of fourteen years, he was ransomed for $10,000. His colleagues in Romania urged him to leave the country and work for religious freedom from a location less personally dangerous. After spending time in Norway and England, he and his wife Sabina, who had also been imprisoned, emigrated to the United States. They dedicated the rest of their lives to publicizing and helping Christians who are persecuted for their beliefs. Wurmbrand founded Voice of the Martyrs, a Christian human rights NGO, to aid the persecuted Church.

He wrote more than 18 books, the most widely known being Tortured for Christ and Answer to Moscow's (Atheist) Bible. Variations of his works have been translated into more than 38 languages.

== Early life ==
Wurmbrand, the youngest of four boys, was born in 1909 in Bucharest in a Jewish family. He lived with his family in Istanbul for a short while, his father died when he was 9, and the Wurmbrands returned to Romania when he was 15.

As an adolescent, he travelled to Moscow to study Marxism for a few months. Pursued by Siguranța Statului (the royalist secret police), he was arrested and held in Doftana Prison. When returning to his mother country, Wurmbrand was already an important Comintern agent, leader, and coordinator directly paid from Moscow. Like other Romanian Communists, he was arrested several times, then sentenced and released again.

He married Sabina Oster on 26 October 1936. Their son Michael was born in 1941. Wurmbrand and his wife (known as Bintzea to her friends) converted to Christianity in 1938 due to the witness of Christian Wolfkes, a Romanian Christian carpenter and his wife; they joined the Anglican Church's Ministry among Jewish people (CMJ UK). Wurmbrand was ordained twice - first as an Anglican, then, after World War II, as a Lutheran pastor. In 1944, when the Soviet Union occupied Romania as the first step to establishing a communist regime, Wurmbrand began a ministry to his Romanian countrymen and to Red Army soldiers; the Socialist Republic of Romania had a doctrine of state atheism. When the government attempted to control churches, he immediately began an "underground" ministry to his people. Wurmbrand was a professor in the only Lutheran seminary in his country. Though a devout Lutheran pastor, Wurmbrand was highly ecumenical in that he worked with Christians of many denominations. Wurmbrand is remembered for his courage in standing up in a gathering of church leaders and denouncing government control of the churches. He was arrested on 29 February 1948, while on his way to a Divine Service.

== Imprisonments ==
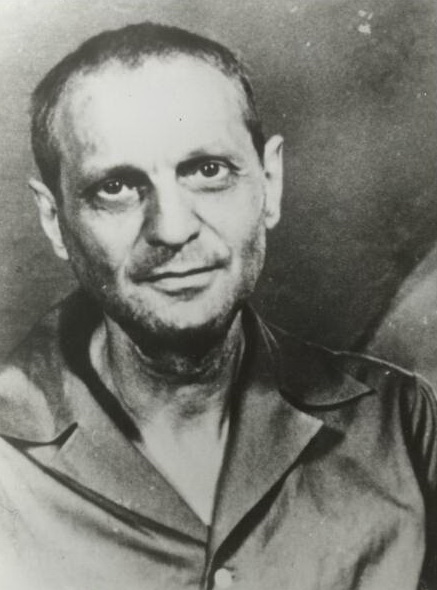
Wurmbrand in prison

Wurmbrand, who passed through the penal facilities of Pitești, Craiova, Gherla, the Danube–Black Sea Canal, Văcărești, Malmaison, Cluj and ultimately Jilava, where he spent three years in solitary confinement. This confinement was in a cell twelve feet (3.65 meters) underground, with no lights or windows. There was no sound because even the guards wore felt on the soles of their shoes. He later recounted that he maintained his sanity by sleeping during the day, staying awake at night, and exercising his mind and soul by composing and then delivering a sermon each night. Due to his extraordinary memory, he was able to recall more than 350 of those, a selection of which he included in his book With God in Solitary Confinement, which was first published in 1969. During part of this time, he later wrote about communicating with other inmates by tapping out Morse code on the wall. In this way he continued to "be sunlight" to fellow inmates rather than dwell on the lack of physical light.

Wurmbrand was released from his first imprisonment in 1956, after eight and a half years. Although he was warned not to preach, he resumed his work in the underground church. He was arrested again in 1959 and sentenced to 25 years. During his imprisonment, he was beaten and tortured. He stated that his physical torture included mutilation, burning and being locked in a large frozen icebox. His body bore the scars of physical torture for the rest of his life. For example, he later recounted having the soles of his feet beaten until the flesh was torn off, then the next day beaten again to the bone, claiming there were not words to describe that pain.

During his first imprisonment, Wurmbrand's supporters were unable to gain information about him; later they found out that a false name had been used in the prison records so that no one could trace his whereabouts. Members of the Secret police visited Sabina posing as released fellow prisoners. They claimed to have attended her husband's funeral. During his second imprisonment, his wife Sabina was given official news of his death, which she did not believe. Sabina herself had been arrested in 1950 and spent three years in penal labour on the Danube–Black Sea Canal 2025. Sabina's autobiographical account of this time is titled The Pastor's Wife. Their only son, Mihai, by then a young adult, was expelled from college-level studies at three institutions because his father was a political prisoner; an attempt to obtain permission to emigrate to Norway to avoid compulsory service in the Romanian army was unsuccessful.

Eventually, Wurmbrand was a recipient of an amnesty in 1964. Concerned with the possibility that Wurmbrand would be forced to undergo further imprisonment, the Norwegian Mission to the Jews and the Hebrew Christian Alliance negotiated with Communist authorities for his release from Romania for $10,000 (though the going rate for political prisoners was $1,900). He was convinced by underground church leaders to leave and become a voice for the persecuted church. He devoted the rest of his life to this effort, despite warnings and death threats.

He was a friend of Costache Ioanid, the Romanian Christian poet.

== Achievements, influence, and death ==
Wurmbrand travelled to Norway, England, and then the United States. In May 1966, he testified in Washington, D.C., before the U.S. Senate's Internal Security Subcommittee. That testimony, in which he took off his shirt in front of TV cameras to show the scars of his torture, brought him to public attention. He became known as "The Voice of the Underground Church", doing much to publicise the persecution of Christians in Communist countries. He would polemicize the idea that Karl Marx was a Satanist.

In April 1967, the Wurmbrands formed Jesus to the Communist world, later renamed Voice of the Martyrs, an interdenominational organisation working initially with and for persecuted Christians in Communist countries, but later expanding its activities to help persecuted believers in other places, especially in the Muslim world.

In 1990, he and his wife returned to Romania for the first time in 25 years. The Voice of the Martyrs opened a printing facility and bookstore in Bucharest. The new mayor of Bucharest, Dan Predescu, had offered a storage space for the books under former dictator Nicolae Ceaușescu's palace, where he had spent years in confinement, praying for a ministry to his homeland. Wurmbrand engaged in preaching with local ministers of nearly all denominations.

Wurmbrand wrote 18 books in English and others in Romanian. His best-known book, titled Tortured for Christ, was published in 1967. In several of them, he wrote very boldly and emphatically against Communism, yet he maintained a hope and compassion even for those who tortured him by "looking at men ... not as they are, but as they will be ... I could also see in our persecutors. a future Apostle Paul ... [and] the jailer in Philippi who became a convert." Wurmbrand last lived in Palos Verdes, California.

He died at the age of 91 on 17 February 2001 in a hospital in Torrance, California. His wife, Sabina, had died six months earlier on 11 August 2000.

In 2006, he was voted fifth among the greatest Romanians according to the Mari Români poll.

== Books ==
- 100 Prison Meditations (1984)
- Alone With God: New Sermons from Solitary Confinement (1988)
- Answer to Half a Million Letters
- Answer to Moscow's (Atheist) Bible
- Christ in the Communist Prisons (1968)
- Christ On The Jewish Road (1970)
- From Suffering To Triumph!
- From The Lips Of Children
- If Prison Walls Could Speak (1972)
- If That Were Christ, Would You Give Him Your Blanket?
- In God's Underground
- Jesus (Friend to Terrorists) (1995)
- Marx & Satan (Crossways Books, 1986)
- My Answer To The Moscow Atheists (Arlington House, 1975)
- My Correspondence With Jesus
- Reaching Toward The Heights (1977)
- Stronger than Prison Walls
- The Answer to Moscow's Bible
- The Oracles of God
- The Overcomers
- The Sweetest Song
- The Total Blessing
- Tortured for Christ (1967)
- Victorious Faith (1979)
- Why am I a Revolutionist?
- With God In Solitary Confinement (1979)

== Videography ==
- Tortured for Christ - Docudrama.
- Richard and Sabina Wurmbrand - documentary DVD.
- Torchlighters: The Richard Wurmbrand Story - animated DVD for children 8–12.
- Tortured for Christ - The Nazi Years - Docudrama.
- Sabina:Tortured For Christ: The Nazi Years - Docudrama

== Cited sources ==
- Wurmbrand, Richard (1967). Tortured for Christ. Living Sacrifice book co.
