= Poarta Albă =

- Commune
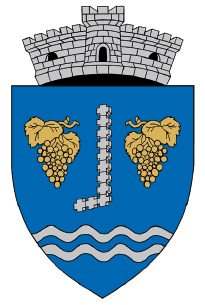
- Coat of arms

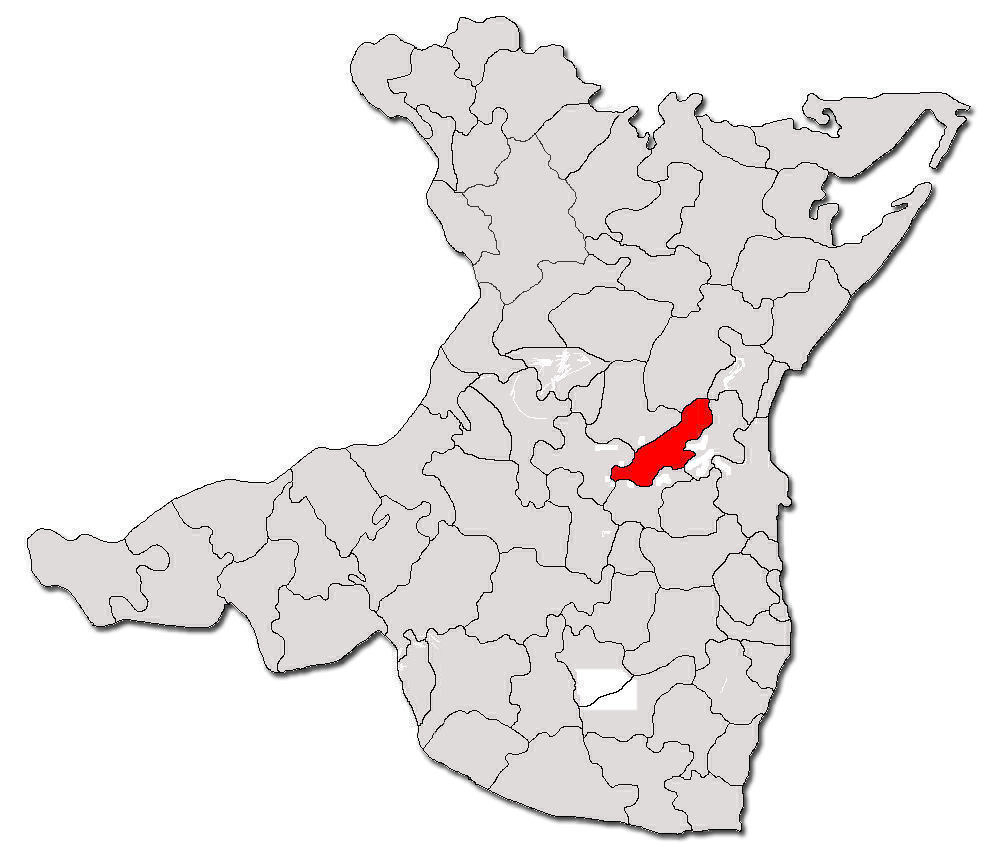
- Location in Constanța County

- Location in Romania
- Coordinates: 44°13′N 28°24′E
- Country: Romania
- County: Constanța
- Subdivisions: Poarta Albă, Nazarcea

Government
  - Mayor (2020–2024): Vasile Delicoti (PNL)
- Area: 65.53 km^{2} (25.30 sq mi)
- Elevation: 23 m (75 ft)
- Population (2021-12-01): 5,587
  - Density: 85.26/km^{2} (220.8/sq mi)
- Time zone: UTC+02:00 (EET)
  - Summer (DST): UTC+03:00 (EEST)
- Postal code: 907245
- Area code: +40 x41
- Vehicle reg.: CT
- Website: www.primariapoartaalba.ro

Poarta Albă (Romanian pronunciation: [ˈpo̯arta ˈalbə]; literally in English: White Gate) is a commune in Constanța County, Northern Dobruja, Romania. The commune is a port on the Danube–Black Sea Canal.

== Villages ==
The following villages are included in the Poarta Albă commune:

- Poarta Albă (historical name: Alakap, Turkish: Alakapı)
- Nazarcea (historical name: Galeșu between 1930 and 1964, Turkish: Nazarça)

== History ==
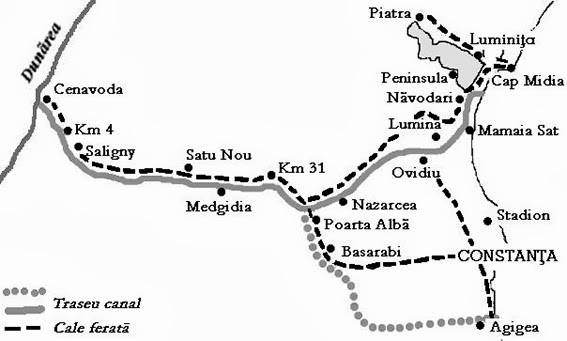
Map of forced labor camps along the Danube–Black Sea Canal building site

In the early 1950s, a prison camp operated at Poarta Albă, part of a chain of forced labour camps set up along the length of the Canal by the communist authorities. Some 12,000 prisoners were held at the Poarta Albă camp. Many perished due to the harsh working conditions. According to a study done by the International Centre for Studies into Communism, 12.7% of all political prisoners in Communist Romania did some time at Poarta Albă.

Among the political prisoners who did time at the Poarta Albă labor camp were Alexandru Claudian, Vladimir Constantinescu, Constantin Ticu Dumitrescu, Gherman Pântea, and Ovidiu Papadima.

== Demographics ==
At the 2011 census, Poarta Albă had a population of 5,208, of which 4,792 were ethnic Romanians (96.69%), 4 Hungarians (0.08%), 35 Roma (0.71%), 53 Turks (1.07%), 55 Tatars (1.11%), 5 Lipovans (0.10%), 5 others (0.10%), and 7 with undeclared ethnicity (0.14%).

== Transportation ==
The Poarta Albă train station serves the CFR Line 800, which connects Bucharest to Constanța and Mangalia on the Black Sea coast.

== Natives ==
- Murat Iusuf
