= Vintilă Weiss =

Romanian Securitate officer and whistleblower (1921–1974)

- Born: 1921; Pantelimon, Ilfov County, Kingdom of Romania
- Died: 17 January 1974 (aged 52); Comarnic, Prahova County, Socialist Republic of Romania
- Burial place: Reînvierea Cemetery, Bucharest
- Military career
- Allegiance: Kingdom of Romania; Romanian People's Republic
- Branch: Siguranța (1946–1948); Securitate (1948–1950)
- Service years: 1946–1950
- Rank: Chestor (Siguranța)

Vintilă Weiss, also Vais or Veis (17 March or 1 April 1921 – 17 January 1974), was a Romanian communist and officer of the Securitate who was for a while imprisoned and tortured by the communist regime. Of Jewish origin, he joined the outlawed Romanian Communist Party in 1938, and remained its member throughout World War II. Immediately after the anti-fascist coup of August 1944, he took a law degree from the University of Bucharest, entered the General Police Directorate, and rose through its ranks to become commissioner, then Chestor. He was then assigned to the Romanian Kingdom's intelligence service, Siguranța, and tenured by the Securitate upon the establishment of a communized republic. Tasked with checking and granting passports, Weiss was in contact with various diplomats, and attracted suspicion that he was feeding them classified information through one of his sisters. The Securitate demoted him in 1948, and then arrested him in 1950; during subsequent interrogations, most of which were held under torture, he sometimes acknowledged the existence of a spy ring, and sometimes recanted.

Weiss claimed to have been framed by his superiors because he did condone their corruption, or because he knew too much; he was reportedly defended by communists such as Ion Vincze, but his sentencing was ensured by the Securitate. Though afflicted by tuberculosis, he was knowingly sent to Gherla Prison in mid-1951, and subject to an experiment in "re-education"—which centered on regular and intense beatings. He would still not admit to having betrayed the party. Instead, using his insight into Securitate politics, Weiss began looking into methods for stopping the experiment and obtaining justice against its perpetrators. Former prisoners have claimed that he implicated Ana Pauker and other factional leaders who were coming to be seen as dangerous by communist leader Gheorghe Gheorghiu-Dej, while also allowing the party leadership to view the Securitate as a rogue institution. Such efforts alarmed his captors, and, in one instance, the experiment's original instigator, Eugen Țurcanu, is said to have taken a personal interest in obtaining his submission.

As the party reasserted its control, Major Alexandru Roșianu assisted Weiss in making his accusations known to the higher echelons. This ended the mistreatment, allowing other prisoners to regard him as a hero. Weiss, who also survived Aiud Prison (where he was held in 1952–1953), ultimately received specialized treatment for his tuberculosis, allowing him to stand as a witness for the prosecution in Țurcanu's trial. The hand-on torturers were swiftly executed by the state. Weiss himself had his conviction overturned, and returned to public life as a lawyer. His career was cut short in 1974 by his death in a road accident, which allowed speculation that he had been killed off in a Securitate cover-up.

== Early life and career ==
The son of Niculae and Cristina Weiss (or Vais), Vintilă was born in Pantelimon, a rural suburb of Bucharest, which is also where he reportedly grew up. His birth year was 1921, but the day is unknown, with sources mentioning 17 March or 1 April. He is known to have had several siblings, including a brother, Petre, who served for a while in the communist militia, and a sister, Maria-Ivona or Yvonne, whose activities would play a significant part in his own downfall. Archeologist Radu Ciuceanu, who befriended Vintilă when they were both political prisoners at Gherla in mid-to-late 1951, could not initially bring himself to ask if he was Christian of Jewish. When their arguments turned heated (either because of ideological disagreements, or because Weiss would not listen to advice on survival), he admits to having called him a "kike", also urging him to he confess his sins to Jehovah.

From 1936 to 1945, Weiss clerked at Riebler, a local automobile repair shop. According to Ciuceanu, the disgraced Securitate man had joined the Communist Party (PCR, later PMR) in 1938, during the time when it was outlawed, and as such had precious information regarding communist leaders Pauker and Teohari Georgescu. As rendered in such reports, Weiss himself claimed to have personally met two rival leaders of the national-communist factions, namely Lucrețiu Pătrășcanu and Gheorghe Gheorghiu-Dej. He regarded the former as a sure victim of the latter, since he had been betrayed by "prominent Jews" in his entourage; he saw Gheorghiu-Dej as immoral, but with various saving graces. As Ciuceanu writes, Weiss was proud of having preserved his membership throughout World War II, even when it seemed that Nazi Germany would conquer all of Europe. Historian Puica Buhoci notes however that Weiss was only a communist sympathizer, rather than a member, during most of the war. He only formally joined the PCR through its front organization, called "Union of Patriots", and afterwards trained at a school for party cadres.

At the time of his Gherla encounters, Weiss stood out among the mass of the communists for having attended or graduated university. Shortly after the political upsurge of 1944, he had been fast-tracked by the University of Bucharest department of law, taking a special one-year course that had been made available to those marginalized under Ion Antonescu's regime. He was recruited by the General Police Directorate, and, on 27 April 1945, assigned to lead Bucharest's fifth precinct, without yet holding a rank. Around that time, he is known to have married a woman named Alexandrina. They had a son, Andrei, whom Vintilă loved greatly.

In August 1945, Weiss was a commissioner of the fifth precinct, witnessing a rise of criminal activity in Moșilor ward. Here, he led the search for the perpetrators of several armed robberies. He was later a Chestor in the passports service—which, as he himself noted, made him the equivalent of a general (though he was casually referred to as a colonel). In July 1946, he organized a census of Bucharest's non-citizen population. From 1 October 1947, he was assigned as liaison of the Siguranța agency within the Bucharest police prefecture. In the early days of 1948, Chestor Weiss, whjo was leading the bureau for alien surveillance, captured and interrogated a group of fourteen people who had allegedly tried to escape over the Iron Curtain. According to the prosecution, they had intended to hijack Constantin Cantacuzino's plane and land it in İzmir. Also then, he arrested Vincenzio Mocci, charged with forging Italian passport for Romanians who were seeking to emigrate.

With the phasing out of royalist institutions during the first year of communism (1948–1949), Weiss became a Securitate cadre. However, the new institutions regarded him with suspicion, and on 1 April 1948 accused him of having betrayed communist morality (by having sex outside of marriage) and of having improper contacts with foreign diplomats. He was demoted by Securitate chief Gheorghe Pintilie, who thus answered to reports sent in by officers such as Gavril Birtaș and Tudor Sepeanu. Weiss' sister, employed as a typist for the Groza cabinet, was also risking her liberty by networking with French Republican diplomats, including Serge Henri Parisot. Arrested in a mass roundup on 24 May 1950, she confessed that, as early as 1948, her brother had been marginally involved, tipping Parisot about Securitate spies in the French embassy and on France's own soil. As documents of the time reveal, he had also tried to recruit Charles Philippe Gyr, a former Nazi collaborator who was living in Bucharest with no papers, to become a Securitate asset. The very plan became a liability when another wing of the Securitate ordered Gyr's arrest.

== Arrest, conviction, and Gherla arrival ==
Soon after, Weiss lost his remaining privileges. He was arrested by his Securitate peers, on 28 June 1950. As he told his fellow inmates, most of his family was also detained in that context. Alexandrina was however able to contact the high-ranking communist Ion Vincze, telling him that the arresting institutions were run by her husband's personal enemies. According to Ciuceanu, Vintilă himself spoke of having been set up: his lawyer never showed up in court until after the verdict, during an appeals procedure. Weiss was still acquitted by a military court on 6 April 1951. As he told Ciuceanu, the judges had been pressed into clearing his name by Vincze, but the Securitate resubmitted his case, and, on review, he received a 10-year term in jail. This story is partly confirmed by Buhoci, who writes that the procedural review, carried out expediently on 7 April, was done by a colonel. She also confirms the verdict, and mentions that he received a fine of 4,000 lei. The official crime he was found guilty of was that of "assisting in illegal border crossing".

As Ciuceanu details, Weiss believed that Marin Jianu, the titular minister of internal affairs, was the person most responsible for this outcome, and that it was because of a personal vendetta—he claimed to have refused Jianu's demands for personal favors. Buhoci agrees with the narrative, observing that Weiss' moral rectitude prevented him from tolerating corrupt practices. She also cites another victim of the political purges, Emilian Angheliu, who testified that Weiss had been framed by Jianu and others, for having witnessed their illegal activities. Weiss may also have come to believe that he was being held, and interrogated, because someone in government wanted to learn the secrets of his office. Ciuceanu, who agrees, also notes that Weiss was meant to die, after an elaborate staging, once he would have revealed all of what he knew. Weiss was already ill when he entered prison: afflicted with tuberculosis, he had pleural thickening on the left side of his chest (or, in Ciuceanu's description, a "dried-up lung"). He was briefly treated for this ailment in the Văcărești ward. Still an ideological conformist, he reportedly denounced to the Securitate those doctors who reserved favors for political inmates, known to him as "bandits". After Văcărești, he was moved to Jilava Prison, then finally to Gherla, where he arrived on 31 May 1951.

The detainment came shortly after groups of prisoners in Suceava and Pitești Prisons, acting with the Securitate's blessing, had proceeded to "re-educate" themselves and others, with increasingly lethal violence. As Buhoci writes, Gherla's variant was one of "paroxysmal rage." According to Ciuceanu, Weiss had heard of this experiment while still on the outside, and had shrugged it off upon learning that its perpetrators and victims had belonged to the fascist Iron Guard; he "could not have imagined" that he would end up as a target. Aurel Brazdă, who was his first cellmate at Gherla, recalls that, despite being Jewish, Weiss was assigned to live with actual Guardists (including participants in the rebellion of 1941), and told to imitate their rituals. Unbeknownst to both of them, this was the introductory phase of the re-education process, in which victims were supposed to compromise themselves. It was abruptly interrupted by a sudden invasion from the re-educators, each of whom picked up a target for their beatings. Weiss was tortured by Mihai Livinschi, arriving in from Suceava. Brazdă recalls being shocked by the treatment his colleague was receiving, which included being "beat up over an entire night [until] he spit up blood". He recalls Weiss himself concluding: "Tonight, I confessed as much as an entire regiment."

Ciuceanu saw Weiss as perplexed by his being transported into "Room 99"—still unaware of his inclusion in the experiment being carried out there. As the mastermind of "re-education", inmate Alexandru Popa Țanu reportedly assured him that "you'll be seeing later", then instructed him to sleep "by the window, since we know you have a lung disease." According to the same account, Weiss was afterwards woken up over several nights and bruised by Vasile Pușcașu and other supervisors sent in from Suceava. This sent him into a panic, but also made him wish to learn more about the background of "re-education", to which Ciuceanu answered with details about the goings-on at Suceava and Pitești. Ciuceanu believes that Weiss was slow at integrating new information, not being able to understand why one of the tortured inmates, an elderly peasant, would not reveal to Pușcașu where he had buried his money. Ciuceanu had to explain that doing so, and forfeiting his lifelong earnings, would have shamed him in front of his entire social class.

In other situations recalled by Ciuceanu, Weiss himself was again taken away and beaten, asked to explain why he had betrayed the PMR. He replied to his captors that he had never done such a thing, and that his party membership had never been formally revoked. Buhoci notes that, in all his subsequent statements, Weiss never suggested that the part itself could have been involved in the acts of cruelty at Gherla. Ciuceanu argues that, though he complained at having gone through a "passion week", Weiss was largely spared the more extreme punishments reserved for non-communists (such as having his head banged into a wall). The same is noted by Buhoci: Weiss was burned and bruised but, unlike his colleagues, was never forced to eat feces, and was treated more gently during beatings. This was partly because his status as a communist presented his captors with a dilemma, but also because they continued to fear that he could die from tuberculosis. During his dialogues with Ciuceanu, the former Chestor outlined his theory—namely, that the Securitate was run by an anonymous "Inspections Bureau", which kept informed on every aspect of prison life, and had tacitly approved "re-education". He suggested that the organization had links to the Soviet Union. Though he could not name these figures, he noted that a portion of the Securitate was hastily learning Russian—nominating Birtaș, Jianu, Sepeanu, Nicolae Doicaru and Marin Constantinescu as some of the main liaisons. As retold by Ciuceanu, in one context Weiss stated that the Soviet-appointed Pintilie was directly supervising Birtaș and Jianu.

== Whistleblowing ==
After returning from a night-long interrogation, Weiss suffered a severe episode of hemoptysis, with the blood spilling over Ciuceanu. This alarmed Popa Țanu and the others, who sent him for emergency treatment and Ciuceanu to act as his handler. The Chestor and the archeologist continued to share space in Room 99, and were made to write their own detailed confessions; Pușcașu, watched over Weiss' text, encouraging him to write more neatly, and instructing him to add clearer references to the PMR's role in society. In their moments alone, Ciuceanu tried to instruct his colleague on how to write "optimistically", burying mention on his conflicts with Jianu—and also told him not to eulogize the Red Army, "since not all [Securitate men] can stand their Soviet advisers." He also advised him to invent stories of conspiracies that could be neither proven nor disproved. As he informs, Weiss refused to write down anything other than information that he would have voluntary divulged to the PMR under regular circumstances.

Ciuceanu recounts that, upon realizing the scale of the experiment, and the scale of suffering, Weiss posited that its cruelties had surpassed those of the Holocaust. This stance infuriated Ciuceanu, who told him that the experiment was simply a local development in Stalinism, in line with the Great Purge and the Holodomor. They also quarreled when another inmate died in his sleep. Weiss was annoyed that Ciuceanu appeared indifferent to this event, only to be told that, "to us, death is liberation." In Ciucanu's retelling, Weiss was ultimately aghast upon discovering that most re-education subjects were peasants, rather than exploiters, and came to express admiration for those prisoners who had fought as anti-communist guerrillas. The two men came to agree that Weiss was being held primarily for his direct access to files on Jewish emigration to Israel, since he had indirectly witnessed where the migrants' hastily abandoned property had ended up. Ciuceanu claims that Weiss knew of Pauker and others having enriched themselves in the process.

Ciuceanu recalls that, in August 1951, the prisoners were terrorized by an inspection from Pitești's own Eugen Țurcanu, introduced to Weiss as "the father of these devils". Țurcanu briefly interrogated Weiss, telling him to "cough it all up" during re-education. Weiss defied and half-threatened his visitor, telling Țurcanu that would confess directly to the PMR's highest echelons. Initially unimpressed by the encounter, Weiss was "struck dumb" later that day, when Țurcanu personally oversaw a mass beating of the entire Gherla group. The story of his personal brush with Țurcanu entered prison folklore—Richard Wurmbrand recalls hearing it from one of Țurcanu's men, but places it in Pitești, and remembers the name as "Virgil Weiss" (identifying him as "a friend of Ana Pauker [who] fell out of favor"). Wurmbrand recalls being told that, despite having fainted thrice during the re-education session, Weiss refused to talk to Țurcanu: "I have disclosures to make, but not to you. They concern traitors in high places." Buhoci observes that Weiss confounded the team of re-educators by providing details on the Securitate's own corruption networks.

For the rest of the month, Weiss was regularly taken in for additional interrogations—even as his comrades were being allowed to recover. In late August, he spoke to Securitate Major Alexandru Roșianu, who had arrived from Bucharest on an impromptu visit. This greatly alarmed Popa Țanu, who came in to ask what the two had talked about; Weiss told Ciuceanu and the others that Roșianu had been tipped off about re-education, and wanted to be sure that the details were genuine before following up with a formal investigation. He was for a while sent to the infirmary room, where he had his final encounter with Brazdă, informing him that he was being used as a witness against Pauker and Georgescu, and happy to oblige the investigating authorities. Major Coman Stoilescu, whom Roșianu had replaced, still argued that the interrogations under torture had been successful. In September, Stoilescu tried to submit a review one of Weiss' earlier statements, in which he had mentioned a "vast network of spies" that included Maria-Ivona. The authorities took notice, and sped up procedures to have Weiss called up to Bucharest for more questioning.

Ciuceanu recounts that Lieutenant Constantin Avădanei, who had generally approved of re-education, came into Room 99 later that month. He was not accompanied by any of the re-educators, which Weiss took as a clue that the experiment would not continue for long. He himself barely survived another bout of hemoptysis. During his recovery, he noted that the prison leadership, and some Securitate people sent in from Bucharest, had got him to recant his confession to Roșianu, promising him clemency in return. Together with Ciuceanu, Weiss came to believe that his earlier testimony was being read by the PMR general secretary, Gheorghiu-Dej, who was setting it aside in the power struggle against Pauker and the pro-Soviet wing of the Securitate (including Jianu, but also Pintilie and Alexandru Nicolschi). According to this reading, the men coming in to silence Weiss were from the Pauker faction.

== End of re-education and later life ==
Ciuceanu notes that, by October 1951, his friend was receiving high-quality medical treatment, even as other cellmates were being ignored. On 6 October, Weiss was moved out of Gherla. He quietly signaled his goodbye to Ciuceanu; a Securitate ambulance drove him to Bucharest, and he was again held for a while at Jilava, where he continued to provide statements until his illness prevented him from doing so. He returned to Văcărești hospital, where it was determined that both his lungs were attacked by tuberculosis. During the period, his sister's involvement in the Parisot affair was brought up by Securitate interrogators. He now denied any wrongdoing, telling them that he and Maria-Ivona had only discussed gossip regarding Nicolschi and other Securitate figures. In tandem, he reiterated his accusations against the Securitate leadership, implicating them in the re-education experiments. As noted by historian Mihai Demetriade, he tried to emphasize the affair's conspiratorial aspects ("cabals involving members of the party"), knowing that he would thus receive attention from those who wished to hold on to power. Likewise, Buhoci observes that Weiss' narrative was a "strategically chosen cohabitation of fact and fiction", which was mainly intended to shock the authorities. According to Wurmbrand, his detailed report combined revelations about Țurcanu with allegations about Pauker and the others (including that they had purchased false passports, readying to leave the country with their loot).

The text reached Gheorghiu-Dej through his Securitate liaison, Evghenie Tănase; the general secretary also received a detailed letter from Weiss' father, which confirmed the story. Pintilie was then ordered by Dej to investigate his own men. One of these was Nicolschi, who, on 19 October 1951, signaled that he intended to "carefully study Vais' statements"—positing that any "important things" needed to be examined, but also that any allegation about Securitate cadres needed to be "handled with lots of care". While reporting on the torture practices (for which he blamed the Iron Guard), Roșianu sounded the alarm about the spying network at the heart of the Securitate, thus opening the way for a potential formal investigation into the affair. On Pintilie and Nicolschi's orders, Weiss was sent to be reinvestigated by Mișu Dulgheru's Eighth Securitate Directorate. Dulgheru now confirmed that "a number of inhumane things" had occurred in Gherla; while he too shifted focus on the Guardist cells, he made note that Pintilie, Nicolschi and Vladimir Mazuru were indirectly aware of their existence. Wurmbrand believes that, unlike the Securitate, the Gheorghiu-Dej faction of the PMR had either not known, or not cared, about re-education. Weiss' treatment by re-educators signaled to them what they could all expect for themselves if ever on the losing side of a power struggle, and as such that they needed to punish those responsible, with Pauker and Georgescu "made scapegoats" in the process.

The PMR established its own investigation commission, chaired by Ladislau Ady (soon after appointed as deputy minister of internal affairs). It staged its own interrogations of Weiss, during which the latter claimed that re-education had been engineered from abroad by the Iron Guard leader, Horia Sima, so as to compromise communism. Re-education was abruptly ended in February 1952 by Gherla's warden, Colonel Ludovic Cseller, who reportedly feigned indignation that subjects had been deprived of sleep without Securitate approval. As noted by journalist Mihai Pelin, the only people ever truly punished were those directly engaged in perpetrating the experiments, still singled out as Iron Guard affiliates. Some twelve of them where executed by firing squad. Buhoci observes that all these men had come to publicly endorse Weiss' final theory, as vetted by the Ady commission, in describing themselves exclusively as agents of the Iron Guard. As the same historian notes, Weiss himself was punished one final time by the Securitate (she nominates Pintile as the culprit). The revenge consisted in detaining him at Aiud Prison, "in infernal conditions, between 19 September 1952 and 20 February 1953".

At a PMR plenary session in August 1953, Alexandru Moghioroș addressed Alexandru Drăghici, who had emerged as paramount head of the Securitate, theorizing that re-education had only been possible because Securitate men "have been denying the party in its leadership role". As proposed by Demetriade, Moghioroș and, behind him, Gheorghiu-Dej were relying on the less credible portions of the Weiss report to justify their move toward reducing Drăghici's autonomy. Weiss appeared as a witness for the prosecution at the Țurcanu trial, which alarmed the Securitate. In an institutional report issued on 1 September 1954, it suggested that all of Weiss' statements regarding "strictly secret aspects of the [Securitate] work" be censored out of the dossiers. Still imprisoned at various locations, Ciuceanu made a point of informing others about Weiss' actions, describing him as the Jewish hero who had single-handedly ended re-education. Wurmbrand also credits Weiss as instrumental in curbing the violence, but only partly. In his account, the experiment was also compromised by the detainees of Târgu Ocna, who feared that the tortures were being imported there by Sepeanu. Preemptively, one of them reported that Sepeanu had not only served Antonescu's regime on the Eastern Front, but had also personally executed Soviet prisoners of war; Wurmbrand adds, that, once placed on trial for war crimes, Sepeanu "revealed much of what was going on in the prisons."

In his 2006 piece, Pelin observed: "We could not find out what later happened to the prisoner Vintilă Weiss". Buhoci's investigation reveals that he was acquitted on 31 August 1955, and later allowed to practice law in Bucharest. In his later years, he was a registered lawyer within the Bucharest bar association's fourth college. His brother Petre was detained alongside his sister, and sentenced to 25 years, before being amnestied in 1964. Maria-Ivona was herself released after a five-year imprisonment, and by the time of her death was a double amputee; she predeceased Vintilă in October 1972. His own obituary piece, on 19 January 1974, mentions his death as occurring "in a horrible accident". It also informs that his funeral was being organized at Reînvierea Cemetery by his surviving relatives (including both parents, his wife Elena, and two sons—Andrei and Cristian). Later investigations indicate that he had died on 17 January while driving outside Comarnic, on the hairpin turns of national road 1, and in what one of his lawyer friends described as "suspicious circumstances". As recounted by Ciuceanu (who places the events "around 1960"), he was returning from a trip to the mountains in his Volkswagen when he was hit by a truck with no headlights. Ciuceanu more clearly suggests that the death may have been an assassination, like Cseller's own apparent suicide, and as such parts of a cover-up attempt.

== Sources ==
- Aurel Brazdă, "Victimă și martor ocular al 'fenomenului Pitești', la Gherla, între 1950 și 1952", in Analele Sighet, Vol. 7, 1999, pp. 419–577.
- Puica Buhoci, "Dicționar biografic. Vintilă Vais", in Arhivele Totalitarismului, Issues 3–4/2018, pp. 253–257.
- Radu Ciuceanu,
  - Memorii. Vol. 1: Intrarea în tunel. Bucharest: Editura Merdiane, 1991. ISBN 973-33-0180-9
  - Memorii. Vol. 5: La taină cu diavolul. Bucharest: National Institute for the Study of Totalitarianism, 2015. ISBN 978-973-7861-83-2
- Mihai Demetriade, "Istoricul Serviciului de contrainformații penitenciare (1949–1967)", in Caietele CNSAS, Vol. VIII, Issue 2, 2015, pp. 7–180.
- Richard Wurmbrand, Christ in the Communist Prisons. New York City: Coward-McCann, 1968.
