= Alexandru Nicolschi =

Romanian communist activist and intelligence officer

- Alexandru Nicolschi

Inspector general of the Ministry of Internal Affairs
- In office 1953–1961

Deputy Director of the Securitate
- In office 1948–1953

Director of the Mobile Brigade
- In office 1946–1948

Personal details
- Born: Boris Grünberg; June 2, 1915 Tiraspol, Russian Empire (now in Transnistria, Moldova)
- Died: April 16, 1992 (aged 76) Bucharest, Romania
- Party: Romanian Communist Party
- Spouse: Vanda Nicolschi
- Awards: Order of the Star of the Romanian People's Republic; Order of Tudor Vladimirescu

Military service
- Allegiance: Kingdom of Romania (1937–1939); USSR (1940–1944); Kingdom of Romania (1944–1947); Romanian People's Republic (1947–1961)
- Branch/service: Romanian Armed Forces; NKVD; Romanian Police; Mobile Brigade; Securitate
- Years of service: 1937–1939; 1940–1961
- Rank: Lieutenant general
- Battles/wars: World War II; Romanian anti-communist resistance movement

Alexandru Nicolschi (born Boris Grünberg, his chosen surname was often rendered as Nikolski or Nicolski; Russian: Александр Серге́евич Никольский, Alexandr Sergeyevich Nikolsky; June 2, 1915 – April 16, 1992) was a Romanian communist activist, Soviet agent and officer, and Securitate chief under the Communist regime. Active until 1961, he was one of the most recognizable leaders of violent political repression.

== Biography ==
=== Early life ===
Born to a Jewish family in Tiraspol, on the eastern bank of the Dniester river (part of Russian Empire at the time), he was the son of Alexandru Grünberg, a miller. His family relocated to Chișinău shortly after the union of Bessarabia with Romania. In 1932, he joined the local section of the Romanian Union of Communist Youth, a wing of the Romanian Communist Party (PCdR); in 1933, due to his political activities, he was arrested and held for two weeks by the Romanian secret police, Siguranța Statului. Later in the 1930s, as associates of General Secretary Vitali Holostenco, he and Vasile Luca were elected to the internal Politburo (which was doubled by a controlling body inside the Soviet Union). In 1937, he joined the ranks of the Moscow-controlled PCdR. He did his military service in the Signals Regiment of Iași in 1937–39, being discharged with the rank of corporal. He subsequently worked for the telephone exchange in Chișinău.

In December 1940, following the onset of the Soviet occupation of Bessarabia and Northern Bukovina, Grünberg became a Soviet citizen, joined the NKVD, and trained as a spy in Chernivtsi (Cernăuți). He was sent undercover into Romania on May 26, 1941, carrying papers with the name Vasile Ștefănescu, in order to report on Romanian Army movements in preparation for Operation Barbarossa (the invasion of the Soviet Union by Nazi Germany, in which Romanian troops, under the command of Marshal Ion Antonescu, participated; see Romania during World War II). He was apprehended by Romanian border guards after just two hours (according to subsequent reports, he was given away by the fact that he could not express himself in Romanian). His case was investigated June 6–12 by the Special Investigations Service's Lieutenant Colonel Emil Velciu; Nicolschi confessed he had been recruited into Soviet intelligence by NKVD Captain Andreev. After a short trial, he was sentenced to life imprisonment and hard labor on August 7, 1941. He was sent to prison in Ploiești, and then Aiud, where other Soviet spies, such as Vladimir Gribici and Afanasie Șișman, were also held. It was during the time that he began using his adopted name and passed himself off as an ethnic Russian.

=== Detective Corps ===
He was set free by the Red Army occupying Romania on August 28, 1944, and benefited from a general amnesty. In October, Nicolschi was incorporated into the police force, becoming an inspector, while, in parallel, he rose rapidly through the ranks of the PCR. In May 1945, just after the end of World War II in Europe, he was present in Moscow, where he was entrusted with the task of transporting Ion Antonescu and his group of collaborators (Mihai Antonescu, Constantin Pantazi, Piki Vasiliu, and others, all of whom had been captured by the Soviets) from Lubyanka back to Romania. On April 9, 1946, it was he who signed the release papers when these prisoners were taken back to Romania by Soviet Lieutenant Colonel Rodin to face trial.

Under the Petru Groza Communist-controlled government, Nicolschi was appointed head of the Detective Corps. At the time, Nicolschi, together with Minister of the Interior Teohari Georgescu, was contacted by Nicolae Petrașcu, a fascist activist who oversaw the main interior branch of the Iron Guard (claiming to represent Horia Sima's exiled leadership of the movement). Petrașcu, who had just been arrested, offered his subordinates' support for the National Democratic Front, which was an alliance controlled by the Communists (in the process, he avoided a direct mention of the Communist Party, and later carried on parallel negotiations with the opposition National Peasants' Party, PNȚ). Georgescu and Nicolschi agreed to the deal, and allowed Iron Guard's affiliates (the Legionaries) to emerge from the underground, awarding them identity papers and employment on the condition that they disarmed themselves. Georgescu was persuaded by Nicolschi to let Petrașcu go free; the minister later confessed that this was done on suspicion that the Iron Guard would otherwise provide support for the National Peasantist leaders: "The PNȚ's attempts, successful up to a certain extent, of attracting Legionaries into their party, [thus] giving them a legal possibility to act against the regime".

According to Georgescu, as a direct result of the understanding, as much as 800 Iron Guard affiliates applied for recognition, including a number of people who had "returned from Germany after August 23, 1944, having diversion as their [original] purpose". In autumn 1945, the two Communist representatives intervened to have sizable groups of Iron Guard members set free from various labor camps, while Petrașcu was awarded a degree of liberty in resuming political contacts. On Georgescu's orders, Nicolschi drew up a list of Legionaries who had been imprisoned for lesser crimes under Ion Antonescu's regime, a document which formed the basis of pardons. Most of the newly released persons were subsequently kept under surveillance by Nicolschi and his Detective Corps. An unknown number of Petrașcu's supporters consequently joined the Communist Party, as part of a large wave of new members.

=== Mobile Brigade ===
Nicolschi was later assigned General Inspector of the traditional secret police, Siguranța Statului, where he and Serghei Nicolau led the will-to-be communist security force "Mobile Brigade", entrusted with silencing political opposition. The unit, which was to become an embryo for the "Securitate", comprised an active cell of Soviet MGB envoys. At the time, Nicolschi himself rose to the rank of colonel in the MGB.

Together with Alexandru Drăghici, Nicolschi ordered a wave of arbitrary arrests in 1946–1947, which – according to some sources – came to mark the lives of as many as 300,000 people. He also played a role in the killing of Ștefan Foriș, who, after being toppled from his position as General Secretary, had been kept in seclusion; it was Nicolschi who ordered Foriș' mother to be drowned in the Crișul Repede. In 1967, he indicated that one of his subordinates, a certain "comrade (Gavril) Birtaș" of the Oradea section, had taken the initiative:

Comrade Birtaș had received the indication to talk to her and get her to return to Oradea and admit herself into an old people's home. Details of how Comrade Birtaș has accomplished the mission are not known to me.

In late 1947, after the PCR forced King Michael I to abdicate, Nicolschi escorted the latter out of the country and as far as Vienna. During May, Nicolschi, together with Marin Jianu, engineered a series of trials for sabotage, which notably implicated the industrialists Radu Xenopol and Anton Dumitru, who were accused of having destroyed their own enterprises as a means to resist nationalization.

=== Securitate crimes ===
After the founding of the Securitate on August 30 of that year, Lieutenant General Gheorghe Pintilie (Pantelei Bodnarenko) became the first Director of this organization. The positions of Deputy Directors went to two Major Generals Nicolschi and Vladimir Mazuru, both of whom were at the same time Soviet KGB officers; nobody could be appointed to the Securitate's leadership without their approval. Together, they oversaw the creation of the massive Communist Romanian penal system and communist terror apparatus, starting in February 1950. As historian Vladimir Tismăneanu argues, this was made possible by the Soviet agents and their relations with the group around emerging Communist leader Gheorghe Gheorghiu-Dej: "if one does not grasp the role of political thugs such as the Soviet spies Pintilie Bodnarenko (Pantiușa) and Alexandru Nikolski in the exercise of terror in Romania during the most horrible Stalinist period, and their personal connections with Gheorghe Gheorghiu-Dej and members of his entourage, it is difficult to understand the origins and the role of the Securitate".

Upon introducing the new Securitate policies, Nicolschi presented a series of ideological imperatives, resumed in sentences such as:

The rust of bureaucratism has begun to gnaw at us [that is, the Securitate]. Our apparatus cannot be gnawed at, but this is an aspect [of things turned wrong].

Involved in the interrogation of Lucrețiu Pătrășcanu, he ensured Soviet intervention in the proceedings, and was personally responsible for the arrest of Lena Constante. He also played a leading role in the brainwashing experiment provoked by the Communist authorities in 1949–1952 at the Pitești Prison; he encouraged Eugen Țurcanu to carry out the task and carried out regular inspections, during which he would ignore evidence of torture. During that time, Nicolschi also supervised the re-education of hundreds of minors at Târgșor Prison; these minors (some as young as 12) were subjected to psychological experiments and beaten with the intention of being trained in the spirit of the "Communist new man". In the inquiry preceding the show trial for sabotage at the Danube-Black Sea Canal, he led a squad of torturers that was entrusted with obtaining forced confessions from Gheorghe Crăciun and other employees.

As early as 1949, Nicolschi was arguably the first Securitate senior officer to become known for his brutality outside the Eastern Bloc. This came after a Romanian refugee to France, Adriana Georgescu-Cosmovici, recounted the manner in which, four years earlier, she had been tortured by a team of which Nicolschi was a member, and indicated that the latter had been one of the three to have threatened her with guns. She also detailed various torture methods (including vicious beatings of detainees) Nicolschi personally engaged in during interrogations at Malmaison Prison. According to a 1992 article for Cuvântul, Nicolschi ordered the murder of seven prisoners (allegedly the leaders of an anti-communist resistance movement) in transit from Gherla Prison in July 1949.

=== Inner-Party conflicts and retirement ===
Although an associate of Ana Pauker's "Muscovite wing", Nicolschi maintained links with Gheorghiu-Dej, and relied on his NKVD-MGB credentials to survive political turmoil caused by the fall of Pauker, Vasile Luca, and Minister of the Interior Teohari Georgescu. Pauker was officially accused, among other things, of having welcomed the Iron Guard into the Party, although her degree of involvement in the deal remains disputed (while Nicolschi is credited with having initiated it, it was also proposed that his Soviet superiors had played a part in the decision).

He apparently rallied with Gheorghiu-Dej, and, despite the fact that he was still a Soviet citizen, he was decorated with the high distinction Steaua Republicii Populare Române. In 1953, he became a General Secretary in the Interior Ministry. At around that time, his suspicion towards Gheorghiu-Dej allegedly led him to plant microphones in the latter's office.

In 1961, after Gheorghiu-Dej began adopting anti-Soviet themes in his discourse, Nicolschi, promoted to Lieutenant General, was sidelined and forced into retirement, without being denied the luxuries reserved for the nomenklatura. In 1971, he was awarded the Order of Tudor Vladimirescu, 2nd class. He lived through the Nicolae Ceaușescu years, and died in Bucharest, two years after the Romanian Revolution of 1989, as the result of a heart attack. This happened on the very same day he was presented with a subpoena from the Prosecutor General, who had received a formal notification from the victims' families and the Association of Former Political Prisoners (Nicolschi was scheduled for hearings on April 17, 1992). The following day, he was incinerated at Cenușa Crematorium.

Alongside Pintilie and Mazuru, Nicolschi features prominently in theories that the early Securitate was controlled by ethnic minorities (as notably voiced by the press of the ultra-nationalist Greater Romania Party). Referring to this, British historian Dennis Deletant claims that of the total 60 leaders of the Securitate Directorate, 38 were ethnically Romanian, while 22 were divided between 5 other communities (in this statistic, Deletant counts Nicolschi as an ethnic Russian). He concluded that "the numbers drawn from ethnic minorities, although disproportionate, do not appear to be excessive". Deletant also is of the opinion that, while there is indication that the ethnic origin of top officials was obscured, "there is no evidence to suggest the 'Romanianisation' of officers of other ethnic origins".
