= Gheorghe Pintilie =

Russian-born Romanian communist activist and intelligence officer

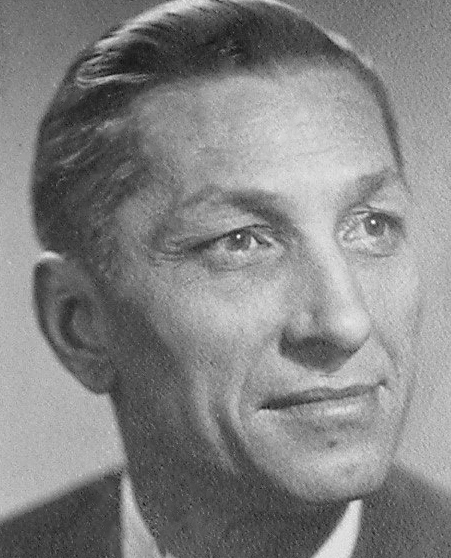

Deputy Minister of Internal Affairs of Romania
- In office September 15, 1949 – January 18, 1963

Director General of the Securitate
- In office August 15, 1948 – 1959
- Preceded by: Position established
- Succeeded by: Vasile Vîlcu

Member of the Great National Assembly
- In office March 1948 – November 1952
- Constituency: Ialomița County

Head of the Miliția
- In office 1959–1960

Personal details
- Born: Timofiy Bodnarenko; November 9, 1902 Tiraspol, Kherson Governorate, Russian Empire
- Died: August 11, 1985 (aged 82) Bucharest, Socialist Republic of Romania
- Resting place: Ghencea Cemetery, Bucharest
- Party: Romanian Communist Party (1940s–1968)
- Other political affiliations: Komsomol (1920s); People's Democratic Front (1948)
- Spouse: Ana Toma
- Children: 2 (adopted)
- Occupation: Locksmith, spy, bodyguard, assassin, torturer
- Awards: Order of the Star of the People's Republic, Second Class (1948); Ordinul Muncii, First Class (1949); August 23 Order, Third Class (1959); Order of Tudor Vladimirescu, Second Class (1971)
- Nickname: Pantiușa

Military service
- Allegiance: Russian Soviet Federative Socialist Republic; Soviet Union; Kingdom of Romania; Romanian People's Republic
- Branch/service: Red Army; NKVD; SMERSH; MGB; Patriotic Combat Formations; Siguranța; DGSP; Miliția
- Years of service: ca. 1920–1963
- Rank: Lieutenant General (Romania)
- Battles/wars: Russian Civil War; World War II; Anti-guerilla operations

Gheorghe Pintilie (born Timofiy Bodnarenko, Ukrainian: Пантелей Тимофій Боднаренко; also rendered as Pintilie Bodnarenco, nicknamed Pantiușa; November 9, 1902 – August 21, 1985) was a Soviet and Romanian intelligence agent and political assassin, who served as first head of the Securitate (1948–1959). Born as a subject of the Russian Empire in Tiraspol, he was briefly employed as a manual laborer, and trained as a locksmith, before joining the Red Army cavalry and seeing action in the Russian Civil War. The NKVD shortlisted him for espionage missions in the 1920s, and in 1928 sent him on for such clandestine work in the Kingdom of Romania. Bodnarenko was apprehended there some nine years later, and sentenced to a twenty-years' imprisonment. While at Doftana, he became the ringleader of imprisoned Soviet spies, together with whom he joined the Romanian Communist Party (PCR). He expressed his loyalty toward Gheorghe Gheorghiu-Dej, the jailed communist and emerging factional leader; their tight political camaraderie lasted into the late 1950s.

Staging a walk-out from Caransebeș Prison just after the coup of August 23, 1944, Bodnarenko was integrated by the Patriotic Combat Formations and the Siguranța police, while also reuniting with Soviet intelligence and joining a special unit of the SMERSH. In 1946, he personally killed and buried three of Gheorghiu-Dej's rivals, including Ștefan Foriș, the former PCR General Secretary. From August 1948, Emil Bodnăraș tasked him with forming the Securitate and leading its General Directorate (DGSP), thus ensuring Soviet control over Romania's intelligence agencies. Under the newly formed communist regime, Bodnarenko was exclusively known as "Gheorghe Pintilie" (or variants thereof), being promoted directly to Lieutenant General, and serving in the Great National Assembly. Participating in the country's communization, he spearheaded the violent campaigns against the perceived class enemies—conceptualizing "reeducation" through penal labor on the Danube–Black Sea Canal, and initiating the first-ever Bărăgan deportations. Pintilie and his adjutant Alexandru Nicolschi also played a part in the Pitești Experiment, which introduced extreme violence with the goal of brainwashing inmates (primarily those detained for their past in the Iron Guard)—though it remains unclear whether they willingly stoked such violence, or just allowed it to happen.

In engineering the DGSP, General Pintilie surrounded himself with men of working-class origin, who became notorious for their brutality, but also their overall incompetence—particularly in dealing with the anti-communist guerillas. Both inside and outside the PCR, Pintilie himself was remembered as an uneducated alcoholic; his preference for orality ensured that the more compromising orders he gave remained unattested. Especially during the early 1950s, he assisted Gheorghiu-Dej in the inner-party struggles, helping to topple Ana Pauker and Vasile Luca, and simultaneously framing, then executing, Lucrețiu Pătrășcanu. Witnesses of these purges remain divided as to Pintilie's exact role, with some reporting that he vacillated when it came to exercising full repression, and others suggesting that he exacerbated the violence, beyond what was required of him. In the late 1950s, his projects were being vetoed by the PCR Central Committee, just as Gheorghiu-Dej was proceeding with Romania's emancipation from the Soviet sphere. In 1959, Pintilie lost his Securitate offices and was assigned to lead the Miliția, a more civilian-controlled component of the national police force.

Pushed into full retirement during the anti-Soviet backlash of 1963, Pintilie then watched as Gheorghiu-Dej's posthumous successor, Nicolae Ceaușescu, proceeded to expose some of the crimes committed by Securitate personnel in previous decades. He cooperated in the investigation, openly discussing some of his individual crimes, but was never questioned regarding his involvement in mass purges; the only repercussions he faced were political, leading to his expulsion from the PCR in 1968. Though his wife Ana Toma was allowed a return to the forefront of political life, Pintilie himself lived the remainder of his life in relative obscurity. The Ceaușescu regime still bestowed him with the Order of Tudor Vladimirescu, Second Class, and granted him military honors upon his death in 1985.

== Biography ==
=== Youth and imprisonment ===
Family records suggest that Pintile's birth name was "Timofiy Bodnarenko", with "Panteley" and other variants only used as pseudonyms. According to a 2005 piece by historian Marius Oprea: "Pintilie Gheorghe, aka Pintilie Bondarenco, aka Pantelei Bodnarenko, aka Pantiușa is the most important figure in the hierarchy of the communist secret police during the first years of the communist regime, although his biography is the hardest to reconstruct." Another historian, Dennis Deletant, reports that Pintilie and a number of other senior Securitate officers were officially presented as Romanians, but notes that all such cases deliberately concealed from the public their true ethnicity. Bodnarenko is colloquially described as a Russian, though he is generally assumed to have been an ethnic Ukrainian. Historian Cristian Troncotă suggests that the future Gheorghe Pintilie was born Jewish Ukrainian, while Securitate officer Nicolae Pleșiță describes him as a Bessarabian Jew. Bodnarenko's daughter dismisses such claims: "My father wasn't even Jewish." Oprea similarly notes that there is "no evidence to back" Jewish-origin accounts, describing instead cases in which Bodnarenko vented his antisemitism. Overall: "We can lend more credence to opinions that describe him as a Ukrainian or a Russophone Bessarabian."

The Bodnarenkos were from Tiraspol, in the Russian Empire's Kherson Governorate (now in Transnistria, Moldova), where Timofiy was born on November 9, 1902. They had a proletarian status: Timofiy's father was a shoemaker; Timofiy himself began working in a woodworking plant at the age of eleven, switching to a foundry some two years later. In 1915, he had trained as a locksmith in Odessa, which remained his formal career until 1928. In the 1940s, communist propaganda suggested that Timofiy was a participant in the October Revolution of 1917. Before the age of twenty, he was fighting for the Red Army in the Russian Civil War—by various accounts, his was a cavalry unit answering to Semyon Budyonny.

A late rumor recorded by dissident communist Belu Zilber notes that young Bodnarenko specialized in murdering enemies of Budyonny "by his own hand". Tatiana Pauker-Brătescu, who was acquainted with Bodnarenko in the late 1940s, recalls him being "a sinister figure": "To what measure, we got to see during one of his drunken exploits. He recounted then that, as a young man in the Komsomol, he would go after the kulaks, and was informed that priests were having meetings out in the steppe, in some pit-house. He got there in no time—this was in the Ukraine—and I don't know if he ever summoned them to get out, but in any case he covered the pit-house in earth and killed them by suffocation." Deletant also writes: "According to one source, the October Revolution brought to the surface a sadistic streak which characterised his direction of the Securitate after 1948."

In the early 1920s, the Soviet NKVD recruited "Pantiușa" for espionage and sabotage actions. From 1924 or 1925, he was directed toward his native Tiraspol, which was serving as capital for the Moldavian Autonomous Soviet Socialist Republic. Upon arriving there, he was trained to carry out subversion in the neighboring Kingdom of Romania. The NKVD finally sent him across the Romanian border in 1928, when he crossed the Dniester into Bessarabia using falsified Romanian identity papers. Upon his 1940s reinvention as "Gheorghe Pintilie", his official biographies claimed that he was active in Bucharest throughout the early 1930s, helping to rally workers for the Grivița strike of 1933. The Romanian Kingdom's intelligence service, or Siguranța, caught up with him by 1937, when he was arrested. Bodnarenko faced trial as an enemy agent, his defense reportedly arranged by Ion Gheorghe Maurer, a left-leaning attorney. He was sentenced to 20 years in prison.

=== Communist rise ===
Bodnarenko was incarcerated at the Doftana together with others who were held on similar charges (of whom he remained the "most important")—but also with activists of the outlawed Romanian Communist Party (PCR). While in confinement there, Bodnarenko befriended Gheorghe Gheorghiu-Dej, who was to become the PCR General Secretary in 1944. He was subsequently moved to Văcărești Prison, on the outskirts of Bucharest. During most of World War II, when Romania was allied with Nazi Germany against the Soviet Union, both Gheorghiu-Dej and Bodnarenko were held in Caransebeș Prison. Here, "Pantiușa" convinced most Soviet convicts to follow Gheorghiu-Dej's directives and join the PCR as regular members. Gheorghiu-Dej and Iosif Chișinevschi became Pintilie's close friends, assigning him the task of identifying and eliminating informants from within PCR cells. As Oprea notes: "he instilled in Dej a pathological fear of provocateurs, as well as an admiration for the potential and means available to a secret police agency."

In early 1944, the authorities took decisions which further divided the party cells—Gheorghiu-Dej and others were sent to a camp in Târgu Jiu. An eyewitness account by political scientist Pavel Câmpeanu (who was then a young PCR cadre serving time at Caransebeș), Bodnarenko and Chișinevschi became junior leaders of the Caransebeș group, second only to Teohari Georgescu. The anti-German coup of August 23, partly organized by Gheorghiu-Dej's military adviser Emil Bodnăraș, took the communist cells into the open; this was shortly after Bodnăraș had deposed and kidnapped the PCR General Secretary, Ștefan Foriș. As reported by Câmpeanu, Bodnarenko and Georgescu organized the inmates' march out of the unguarded prison on August 24, and then headed with them by train, to Bucharest. According to this account, Bodnarenko resisted attempts to have Câmpeanu negotiate the terms with the Romanian Railways staff, appointing instead Bercu Feldman as PCR representative. Câmpeanu then places the future General Pintilie among the paramilitaries manning the PCR front Apărarea Patriotică in Bucharest's Obor neighborhood, during the final days of August; officially, his function was recorded as "Chief of Service No 1 (guarding of buildings and dignitaries)". Bodnarenko was then assigned to the Patriotic Combat Formations (FLP), which answered directly to Bodnăraș. He was second in command for the FLP's Fifth Section, directly under Simion Bernachi. The unit was armed with old carbines, sent over by Colonel Victor Precup.

The end of World War II enshrined the Soviet occupation of Romania and the communists' infiltration into the Kingdom's governing institutions. During this process, in 1949, Bodnarenko was one of the many PCR cadres who chose new surnames which were meant to conceal their ethnic origins. Like his future Securitate colleague Serghei Nicolau (Nikonov), he opted for Romanianization; their Jewish subordinate, Boris Grünberg, preferred a Russian-sounding name, "Alexandru Nicolschi". Bodnarenko's victim, lawyer-diarist Petre Pandrea, alleges that, by picking out his new surname, the future Securitate chief wanted to pass as a relative of the PCR's hero-activist, Ilie Pintilie. It corresponds with Bodnarenko's earlier pseudonym, Panteley, both being derived from Saint Pantaleon; Pintilie is most common in the Maramureș and Moldavian dialects of Romanian.

Despite his apparent assimilation, Pintilie had a hard time mastering the Romanian vernacular, and is described by political scientist Vladimir Tismăneanu as agramat ("semi-literate"). A Securitate subordinate, Gheorghe Crăciun, found his Romanian to be "broken and vulgar"; or, as Deletant writes: "Those who knew him commented on his [...] heavily-Russian-accented Romanian, coloured with expletives." Troncotă adds that: "Pintilie never mastered the Romanian language, maintaining no links with the Romanian people's way of life, its interests, or its aspirations. His entire work was in serving Soviet interests in Romania, which is to say in undermining Romanian economic, political and military life".

As early as October 1944, Pintilie-Bodnarenko and Nicolschi-Grünberg were assigned by the occupation authorities to lead a Romanian chapter of SMERSH counter-intelligence, whose activity remained classified. As noted by Oprea, Dmitri Fedichkin of the First Chief Directorate also made Pintilie his direct assistant, thereby establishing the Soviet MGB in a position of power over Romanian police agencies. From March 1945, Pintilie was assigned to the Siguranța, which Bodnăraș had proceeded to communize. His takeover there ran parallel to a mass trial of the old Siguranța leadership, resulting in either imprisonment or execution for all those appearing in court.

=== Pătrășcanu's ouster ===
From 1945 to August 1948, Pintilie was also at the helm of the Central Committee's Political and Administrative Office. While here, he prepared a transition from the old-regime Siguranța to a new, fully communized structure, the Securitate. He personally oversaw a money laundering system, which saw the Siguranța dumping gold on the black market, then transferring it toward the PCR. Pintilie was seconded and succeeded at the PCR Office by Alexandru Drăghici, who also continued Pintilie's work in verifying the loyalties of PCR cadres. Troncotă additionally notes that this specialized position made Pintilie the éminence grise of inner-party "conflicts and intrigues". Alexandru Bârlădeanu, who also enjoyed Gheorghiu-Dej's confidence, made the following assessment: "In his line of work [Bodnarenko] was held to be a very honest man. Honest in that he only did what was asked of him. He never took any initiative, since these would've looked like intrigues, on that level of his. Chișinevschi was the opposite. Here's why Dej trusted Pantiușa, who only did things if so ordered by a superior."

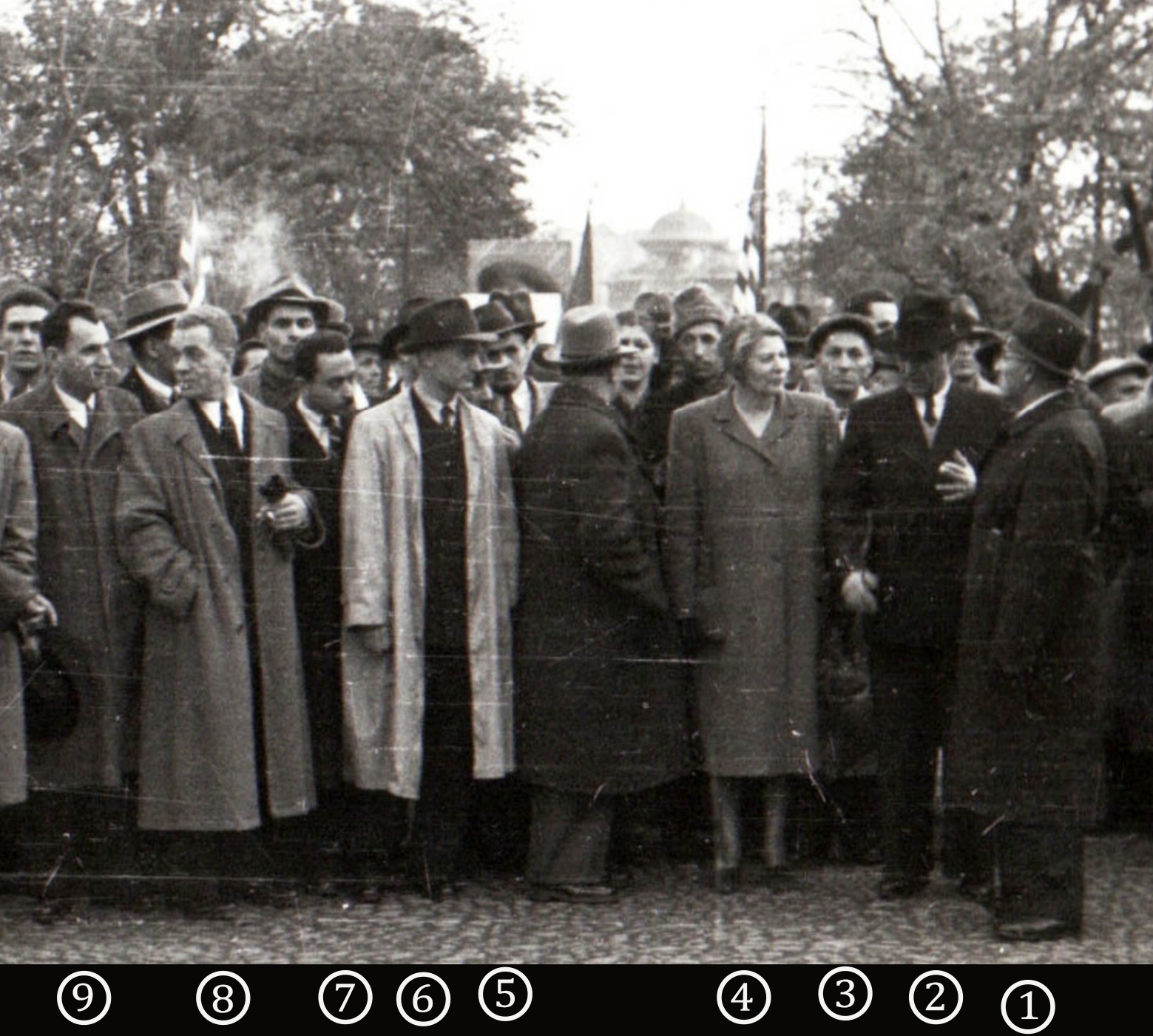
Parade on Șoseaua Kiseleff, Bucharest, to mark the 27th anniversary of Russia's October Revolution (November 7, 1944). Pintilie (number 3) is pictured, between Gheorghe Gheorghiu-Dej (2) and Ana Pauker (4). Also shown: Vasile Luca (1), Constantin Pîrvulescu (5), Iosif Rangheț (6), Andrei Pătrașcu (7), Emil Bodnăraș (8), and Lucrețiu Pătrășcanu (9)

Pintilie himself reminisced that, in early 1945, Gheorghiu-Dej was visibly irritated by the charismatic PCR man Lucrețiu Pătrășcanu, whom he called "that swine". A more urgent task was in neutralizing the Foriș faction—as allegedly reported by "Pantiușa", the Soviet embassy wanted Foriș to disappear before the Allied Commission could hear his story. Bodnarenko's rise was accelerated in summer 1946, when, along with his driver Dumitru Neciu, he kidnapped Foriș. Various accounts suggest that he then beat Foriș to death with a crowbar, though Câmpeanu credits Neciu as the actual killer. The Neciu–Pintilie team is also responsible for two other similar murders, which occurred in the aftermath of Foriș's, with the three bodies buried together at the same compound in Dorobanți. Various authors also implicate Pintilie in the murder of Foriș's mother by a Siguranța team in Oradea, though at least one researcher, Doina Jela, notes that the account may be inexact.

Also in 1946, Pintilie married Ana Grossman-Toma, noted for her wartime activities with the PCR underground; she had previously been married (or romantically linked) to Constantin Pîrvulescu, and then to Sorin Toma. Ana, who kept her second husband's name, became a highly visible asset of the PCR's agitprop section, where she worked under Leonte Răutu. They emerged as a power couple, noted for having equal access to both Gheorghiu-Dej and his rival Ana Pauker. Reportedly, Toma spied on Pauker for Dej, making use of her regular presence in Pauker's intimate circle (which saw her ironing Pauker's dresses). Both Gheorghe and Ana were directly involved in helping Pauker's father Herș Rabinsohn to embark on a Jewish migrant ship bound for Mandatory Palestine—the event was kept secret from others in the party leadership.

Several historians, who see Ana Toma as an MGB asset, propose that she either spied on her husband or existed as a supervising link between the MGB and Pintilie's offices in national security. Their adoptive daughter Ioana ridicules such interpretations, noting that Ana and Gheorghe greatly enjoyed each other's company; she also recounts that her father and Sorin Toma remained close friends. Câmpeanu recalls that the Pintilies formed a "bizarrely non-homogeneous couple", beyond their shared dislike for Foriș. Ana Toma had a Jewish-and-bourgeois background, being congenial, adaptable, and intelligent; Pintilie, meanwhile, was "structurally dogmatic, primitive, obtuse, [...] as inflexible as he was dull." Crăciun found that Pintilie's qualities were reduced to his being "slick" and "entertaining in that way circus clowns are". His main focus, Crăciun contends, was on lying by omission, and on formulating sentences that could mean two things at the same time. By contrast, a report compiled in March 1950 by the French Ministry of Foreign Affairs characterized Pintilie as "very gifted and intelligent".

Documentarist Lucia Hossu Longin argues that, while still at the Siguranța, Pintilie was partly responsible for the Tămădău framing of July 1947, which saw the political destruction, and judicial repression, of Romania's leading opposition group, the National Peasants' Party. The Romanian Kingdom was finally disestablished in the early days of 1948, when the Romanian People's Republic was proclaimed. In May of that year, "Bodnarenco Pintilie" was awarded the Order of the Star of the Republic, Second Class. The PCR also rewarded Pintilie's "faith and toughness" when he was added to the party's Central Committee on June 11. As another recognition for his merits as a communist, he was proposed for, and sent to, the Great National Assembly (MAN) in the March 1948 election. Here, he represented a People's Democratic Front list in Ialomița County, headlined by Constantin Agiu; he only served as such to November 1952.

=== DGSP creation ===
In tandem, Bodnăraș appointed Pintilie as head of the Securitate's General Directorate (DGSP), where he took over on August 30, 1948 (after a formal appointment on August 15). Georgescu, as Minister of Internal Affairs, simultaneously proposed Pintilie for the rank of Lieutenant General, the highest and only such office to be attained by a Securitate cadre at that time; the suggestion was approved by the MAN on August 28, 1948. The position came with "financial revenues that matched [his] devotion." Leadership of the Securitate was officially defined as "defend[ing] the democratic conquests and ensur[ing] the security of the Romanian People's Republic against the plotting of internal and external enemies." As read by Deletant, these two goals were meant, in practice, a defense of communist supremacy, the Securitate being immediately "charged with implementing the regime's policy of repression."

Among the scholars, Liviu Pleșa argues that the appointment was part of a deliberate move to infiltrate security structures with known Soviet spies—including not just Pintilie and Bodnăraș, but also Nicolau, Nicolschi, Vladimir Mazuru, and Lucian Stupineanu. According to historian Adrian Cioroianu, several of these figures, including Pintilie, were not just reactivated spies, but also registered officers of the MGB; Neagu Cosma, at one point the head of Securitate's Counterintelligence Directorate, found that "under Pantiușa and Nicolschi, there were hundreds of other NKVD men, occupying all supervising offices, and quite a few of the executive offices". Pintilie himself credited such notions, reporting that Soviet intrusion had come to be seen as a problem by Nicolau himself, who rebelled against his handlers. He also noted that Gheorghiu-Dej never followed up on Nicolau's reports; according to Pintilie, Nicolau was punished by the Soviets "in some way that remained between them".

Pintilie, Nicolschi and Mazuru, as the very first Securitate triumvirate, were originally involved in greatly increasing the Securitate's personnel, taking on 2,600 new recruits in March 1949. At the time, Pintilie took personal pride in noting that most were working-class men, who "hadn't yet learned how to hold a pen with their hand". The trend was undermined by many resignations, or by cases in which officers never showed up for active duty. Recruitment was finally curbed in early 1950, when the biographical records submitted by the new arrivals were reconsidered. Pintilie led this effort, suggesting that "ever-greater vigilance" was required when vetting new admissions, so that "class enemies will have no way of entering our ranks, or that they be discovered just in case they do". Meanwhile, he kept informed about the round-up of former Romanian Police cadres, including old prison guards. By September 1949, 870 of them had been sent to Târgșor Prison, where they maintained fervent (but unrealistic) beliefs about a coming American liberation of Romania.

From September 15, 1949, Pintilie was also a junior minister at Internal Affairs. The focus of is preoccupation soon turned back to cadre policy. During April, he had expelled Sublieutenant Ioan Moldovan, whose issues with alcohol and violence had become public and embarrassing after his drunken assault on a member of the Workers' Youth. Faced with various other such cases, in February 1951 Minister Georgescu authorized Pintilie to carry out all screening for ranks below that of Major. As Pintilie had explained the previous year, the inner-Securitate crackdown was also directed toward manifestations of spirituality: "We should look into all cases, the cross-wearers and so on, and then we, as well as the rest of our comrades, we should let these other comrades know that, well okay, we won't hold this against you, but [...] the Securitate has no place for you." In October 1951, he sacked Securitate officer Gheorghe Șendroiu, who had been exposed as a former affiliate of the Christian missionary group Oastea Domnului. The matter of dealing with religious organizations fell on DGSP Major Heinz Stănescu, one of the few educated officers in the force. The Directorate suffered an embarrassment in May 1952, when Stănescu was caught attempting to have unconsensual sex with a male civilian. Pintilie had him demoted and sent to work as a foreman at Bicaz; Stănescu was released in 1953, and began his academic career as a philologist (while serving Pintilie as an informant).

Accolades received by General Pintilie included Ordinul Muncii, First Class, in 1949. In late May 1952, shortly before taking over as Interior Minister, Drăghici deplored the ill-preparedness of Securitate officers, though also noting that Pintilie, "sent to us from the outside", was a laudable exception. As the DGSP's junior Director of Inquiries, Tudor Dincă was disconcerted by his own staff's "frightful" linguistic and literary incompetence—however, as noted by historian Florian Banu, Pintilie displayed similar clumsiness, addressing his colleagues in ungrammatical sentences. As recounted by one of the young Securitate cadres who underwent training during that year, Soviet advisers instructed them to view Pintilie as the organizational "father", showing them pictures of his face. The same source reports that meeting Pintilie in person was disappointing: speaking a language that was "archaic, uneducated, riddled with vulgarities", he also looked "prematurely aged" by chain-smoking and continuously binging on vodka, never going home to his wife before 2 AM. Rumor had it that the Lieutenant General had once commandeered a boxcar-load of Plugar cigarettes for his personal use.

=== Pushing for atrocities ===
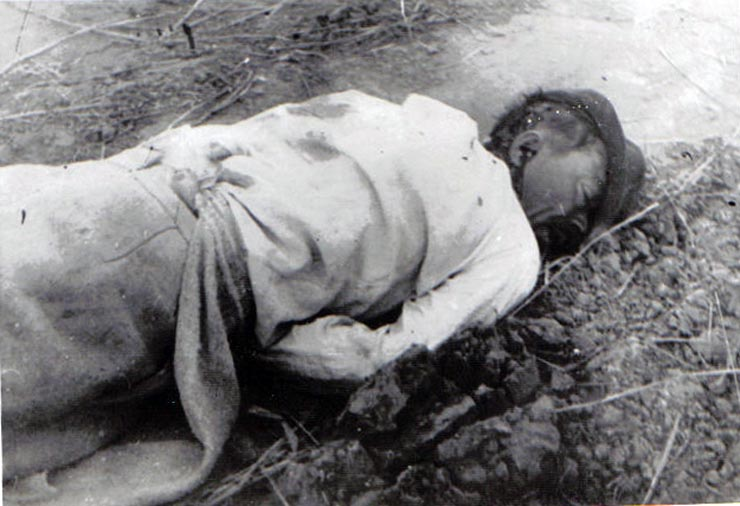
Romanian peasant killed for resisting land collectivization, ca. 1949

According to various accounts, Pintilie was by then tasked with carrying out some of the major terror campaigns and political purges that reshaped Romanian society between 1948 and 1964. In 1950, shortly after taking over as junior minister, he signed Order 100, which established a nation-wide system of labor camps, designed to "reeducate inimical elements", preparing them for "social life within a people's democracy". The order specifically targeted members of those churches and new religious movements that still refused to recognize communist supremacy (see Anti-religious campaign of Communist Romania). As historian Doina Jela notes, he was personally invested, "from the shadows", in "destroying Romania's democratic institutions, as well as in the physical liquidation of its political, economic, cultural and social leaders."

Ion Mihai Pacepa, the Securitate spy master and anti-communist defector, reflects that: "Pantiușa's signature was enough grounds for authorizing the Securitate to arrest any person, to confiscate assets, to deport, to sentence, to execute any person that they labeled a 'counterrevolutionary'. Pantiușa's two subordinates could send anyone into the labor camps." He notes that Pintilie countersigned most deportations on the Danube–Black Sea Canal, as well as the "infamous judicial travesties [...] that have seen the near-liquidation of the Romanian intelligentsia". The Lieutenant General put in place a commission which both proposed and reviewed terms of imprisonment in the labor camps, on a weekly basis, resulting in the geographic "dislocation" of some 11,000 "undesirables" during 1952–1953. In July 1952, after consulting with Nicolschi, Pintilie issued arrest warrants for 417,916 people (some of whom were no longer alive or present in the country); over 130,000 of these were solely targeted for their membership in religious organizations, while 100,000 more were divided between the old regime's political parties.

Prosecutor Grigore Răduică reported in 1992 that he considered Pintilie "responsible for many a crime", including the sending of thousands to do work on the Canal; Pacepa sees him as guilty for the deaths in custody of some 50,000 people. Colonel Ilie Bădică, who was tasked with supervising the labor colonies, claimed in 1968 that improving the living standards of inmates was disallowed by "comrade Pintilie, [...] who said that, if a warden ever gave good food to his prisoners, then he might as well be colluding with the class enemy." One record of the Georgescu–Pintilie conversations sees the latter reporting that scores of people had been arrested "just because we needed to take their homes." Such criminal lassitude was sometimes curbed by the PCR leadership. Also in 1952, Pintilie reluctantly staged a round-up among the staff of the Canal labor camps, arresting eight leading figures of the dedicated Securitate branch. These figures were then tried for their abuses against political prisoners, which helped to document the crimes for posterity. In 1955, a military tribunal handed out 32 prison sentences, including for 21 high-ranking officers. Drăghici had them pardoned within the year, and Pintilie added his weight, ordering that they be reinstated and granted an expense-free vacation.

Faced with an increase in the cases of armed anti-communist resistance, Georgescu, Pintilie, and the other figures at Internal Affairs initially relied on input from the regular police force, or Miliția. In March 1949, they assigned some missions to Eugen Alimănescu, already famous for his wanton killings of criminal suspects. Alimănescu then proceeded to execute anti-communist "bandits" held in custody, including some who had served under Ion Uță and Nicolae Dabija. Alongside Nicolschi, Avram Bunaciu, and others, Pintilie also personally handled the one-week-long trial of Spiru Blănaru, who had assisted Uță in Teregova. The Lieutenant General eventually organized a Singular Command of the Securitate to deal with resistance groups, staffing it with figures such as Pavel Aranici, Ristea Ciuchici, and Spiridon Coman. During March 1950, at the peak of the "Tito–Stalin split", he introduced speculation that the resistance groups of Timișoara Region were being propped up by a Yugoslav network, and that the Securitate's failures in untangling this conspiracy suggested its own infiltration by the "Titoists". In early 1951, he extended the "dislocation" policy to those areas, deporting some 44,000 locals, including children, to the inland Bărăgan Plain.

Pintilie also implicated the Securitate in the more violent aspects of land collectivization, particularly after the Securitate and Miliția were called upon to contain peasant revolts. On August 31, 1949, he organized a meeting of all regional Securitate leaders "in order to instruct them about how to reduce repressive intervention in the villages and take appropriate measures to resolve tensions." In this context, Pintilie acknowledged that some arrests made by the Securitate were based on "imaginary charges", and asked his agents to cease arresting "disorganized inimical elements", unless the latter persisted in their opposition. In July 1950, the Securitate of Cluj County cited its "immediate tasks", as outlined by the Lieutenant General, including "the sound completion of [grain] collecting." As recounted in October by Major Mihail Kovács, who had shot down five peasants near Luduș, "Comrade Minister Pintilie said that we should spare no effort for the timely discovery of conspiracies by the chiaburi against collective farms and yards".

=== Brainwashing experiment ===
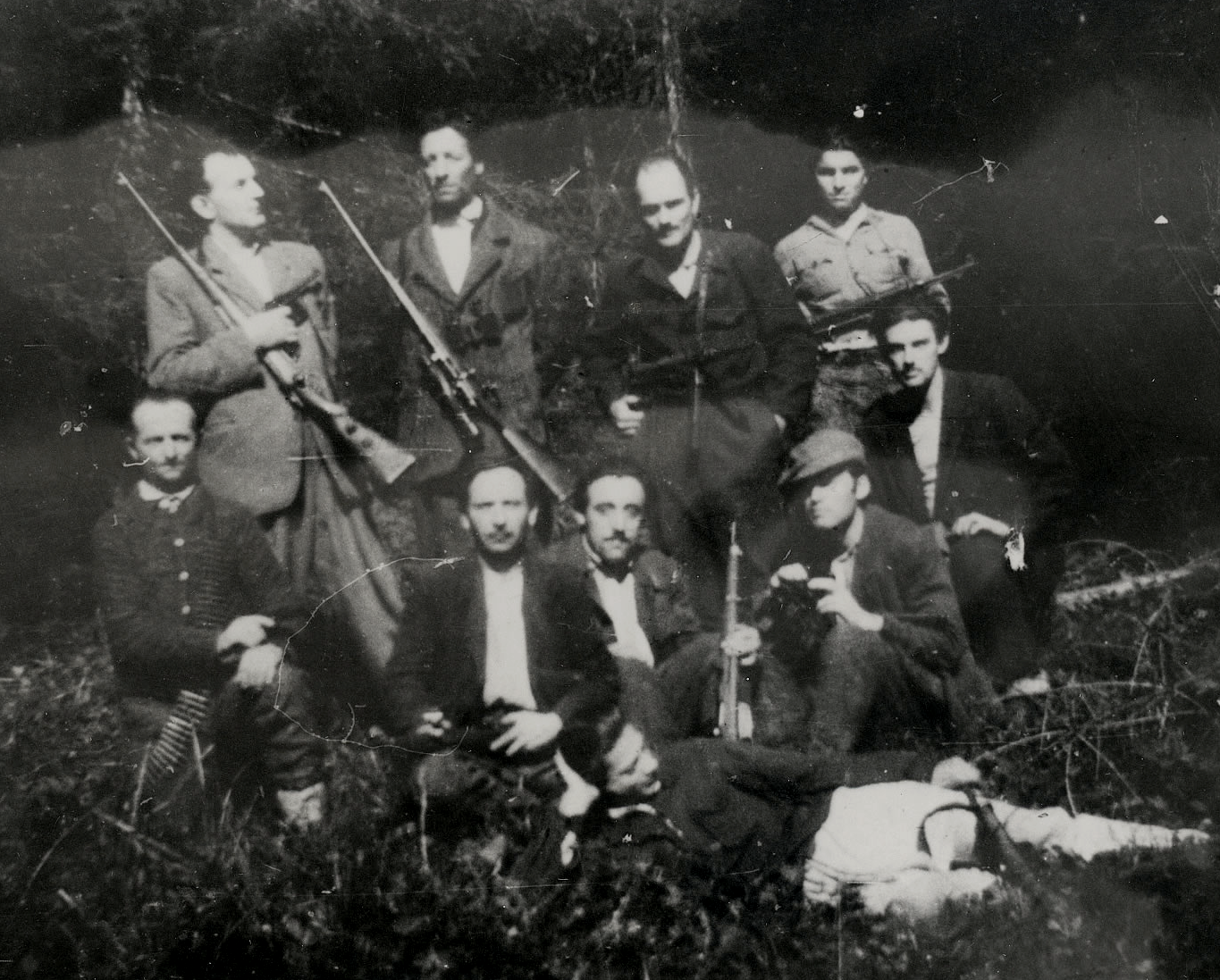
Gărzile lui Decebal, an anti-communist resistance group formed by members and sympathizers of the Iron Guard near Vatra Dornei. Photograph taken in September 1949 by an unknown Gărzile member, and preserved by the Securitate

At the same time, Pintile began highlighting the importance of establishing an informants' network, advising his men that delators were to a Securitate officer "what a razor is to the barber". This directive had an unintended outcome, as various Securitate agents began torturing the potential informants into compliance; Pintilie intervened to stop the practice. In February 1952, he also noted that bribing sources from the "Special Informative Expenses Fund" presented another particular challenge: Securitate cadres preferred to continue with torture, embezzling the bribes for their own benefit. In one such case, presented for his review, high-ranking Securitate officials in Stalin Region had spent Fund money on "partying and personal affairs". The Lieutenant General had relied on Saxon informants and collaborators for bringing the Evangelical Augustan Church, which was geographically folded within the Stalin Region, into the PCR orbit. This led to a kompromat operation against the Saxon bishop, Friedrich Müller, which nonetheless failed to impress his congregation.

One of Pintilie and Nicolschi's main pursuits was a round-up and annihilation of a fascist underground movement, the Iron Guard. According to historian Mihai Demetriade, Securitate leaders felt personally insulted in noting that the interwar Siguranța had "proven success" when it came to untangling Guardist networks. From 1949, Pintilie had insisted on the need to infiltrate Guardist cells formed within Romania's prisons, asking Major Ion Nemeș, and then Lieutenant Colonel Tudor Sepeanu, to oversee the operation on his behalf. As he put in one of his speeches, he knew from personal experience as a prisoner that inmates could and did organize in such a way as to undermine a government. Various researchers identify Pintilie as wholly or partly to blame for the Pitești Experiment, which had exposed political prisoners to crude brainwashing techniques, leaving many dead in its wake. Demetriade describes a "Pintilie method", which consisted in "breaking apart and compromising" the anti-communist cells through the activity of prisoners who had embraced the regime. He credits such guidelines with engendering a spiral of violence, cruelty, and eventually slaughter.

Pintilie took personal credit for the earliest, least violent, form of the experiment, which took place in Suceava. He was not satisfied with the results, since the prison population there was too diverse, and not likely to respond identically to the stimuli. It was Pintilie who decided that the "method" needed to be applied in a penitentiary where youths, and specifically far-right students, could form the majority; he therefore handled the transfer of prisoners to Pitești. Former prisoner Georghe Boldur-Lățescu alleges that both Pintilie and Nicolschi were "directly or indirectly in contact" with the Guardsman-turned-communist Eugen Țurcanu, asking him to "impress 'reeducation' into a new format, which would be based on violence." This new stage was inaugurated on Christmas Day 1949, when Țurcanu's men and the prison guards "savagely beat up" disobedient inmates, while "making sure not to kill anyone." In February 1950, Țurcanu's beatings produced their first fatality, the 22-year-old Corneliu Niță. As confessed by Major Nemeș, both Pintilie and Nicolschi were immediately informed of this, but never intervened to reprimand Țurcanu. Troncotă likewise notes that the experiment was only carried out once the DGSP director had informed his peers that his only focus would be on "unmasking" and "reeducating" anti-communists, especially those who had been in the Iron Guard; Pintilie explicitly noted that he would spare no interest for the methods used to accomplish this goal.

According to Demetriade, this ambiguity allowed the Guardists to revert on their own experiences of political strife: they had learned from their leaders a set of violent methods to use against "traitors" of the Guardist cause, which they now used and amplified against those who still resisted communism. Pintilie's own communist optimism had it that prisoners undergoing "reeducation" would act not only as witnesses for the prosecution, but also as active instigators of investigations, who would go out of their way to expose enemies of the regime. He allowed the atrocities to take place by not providing Nemeș and his team with any restrictive guidelines until early 1951. The set of rules that was supposedly introduced at the time does not survive in any copy. Sepeanu candidly noted that he never received written instructions from either Pintilie or Nicolschi, but also confirmed that "Mr Junior Minister Pintilie" was always his immediate supervisor.

=== In the power struggles ===
Throughout his tenure at the DGSP, Pintilie maintained a role in stifling inner-party opposition, involving himself in the resulting intrigues. As early as 1949, he and Nicolschi had reputedly wiretapped the phone lines used by PCR eminences, including Gheorghiu-Dej. In 1950, Pintilie and Ghizela Vass joined Iosif Rangheț's panel, which investigated the communist orthodoxy of Spanish Civil War veterans. As he noted later on, that project was almost immediately brought to a halt by Teohari Georgescu and Pauker, who thought that the "very suspect" Rangheț was mounting a witch-hunt. Others suggest that Pintilie himself was relatively lenient toward other party cadres, especially when his former lawyer, Ion Gheorghe Maurer, who had joined the PCR as a Gheorghiu-Dej devotee, expressed his qualms about following Soviet directives. According to Maurer's own reports, he was subsequently slated for liquidation by the MGB, and "Pantiușa" was ordered to fabricate a show trial. The project never took off: "Pantiușa Bodnarenko [...] loved me quite a lot [...]. When he got drunk, for he was one hell of a drinker, he would come by my place and cry on my shoulder. Quite a lot of time was wasted on this".

Pintilie, alongside a team of Soviet advisors, had also been tasked with organizing the show trial of Lucrețiu Pătrășcanu and of his intimate circle of disciples. This project began in the final months of 1947, when Bodnarenko informed Pyotr Fedotov, who led the Soviets' Committee of Information, that Pătrășcanu was hampering "Romania's advance toward communism", "using his position at the Ministry of Justice to protect the leaders of opposition parties." Such allegations formed part of a report he sent to the MGB in March 1948. The Pintilie–Fedotov exchange was closely followed by Petre Pandrea's arrest in 1948. According to Pandrea himself, the matter upset other Securitate men—including Mișu Dulgheru, who wanted Pandrea, described by him as a "progressive democrat", to walk free. Dulgheru reportedly confessed that Pintilie personally ensured that such a measure would not be effected.

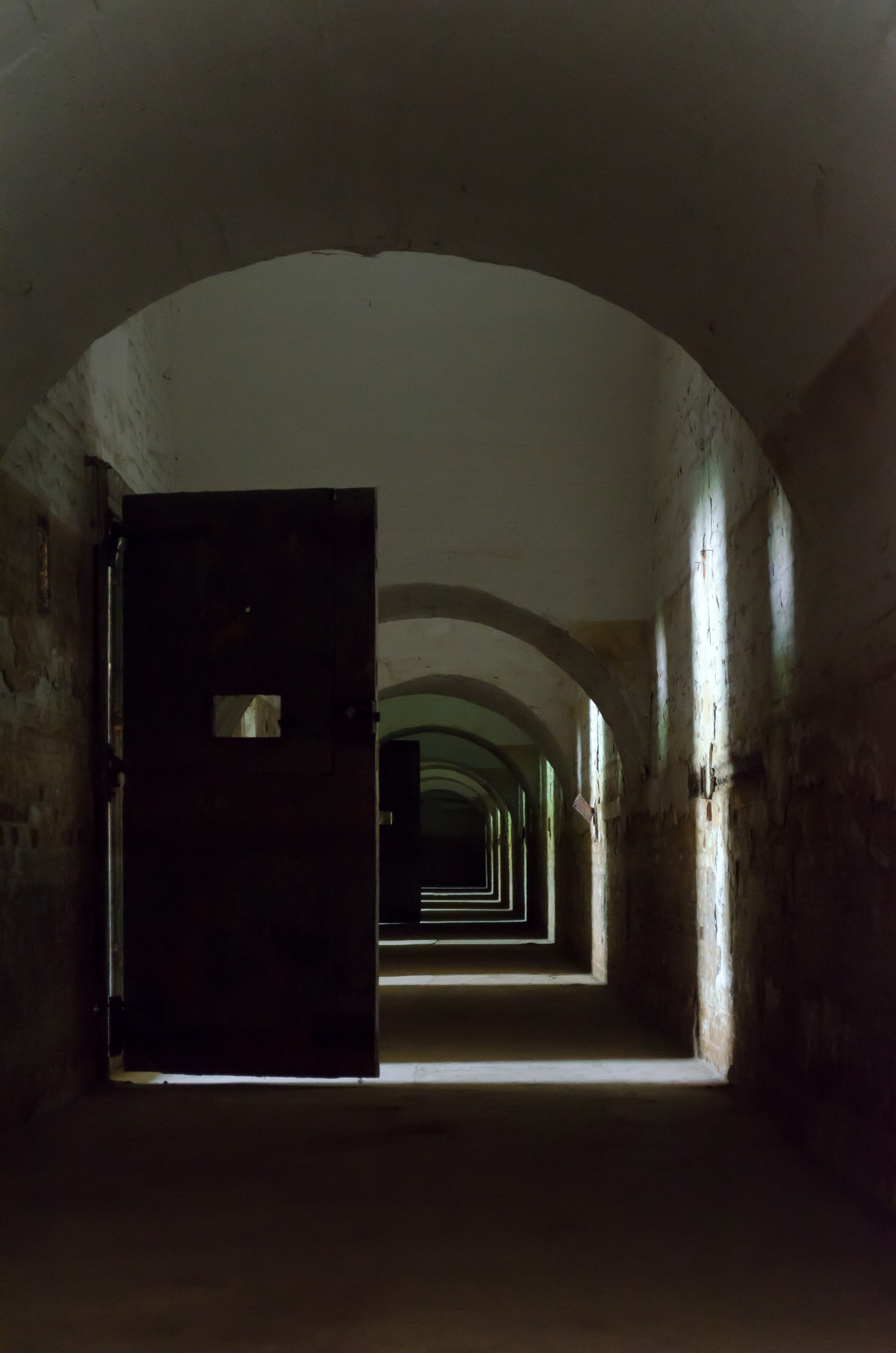
Interior of Jilava Prison, site of Lucrețiu Pătrășcanu's execution

As the operation unfolded, Pintilie was on hand to personally arrest Pătrășcanu, and then ensured that interrogator Ioan Șoltuț could work on his victims in a "special area" that was completely cut off from the outside world. As Pintilie himself reported, by 1949 he had secured approval from Soviet advisers, including Aleksandr Sakharovsky, to deal with Gheorghiu-Dej's enemies in an exemplary manner. According to another member of the Gheorghiu-Dej circle, Gheorghe Apostol, the affair was entirely masterminded by Drăghici and "Pantiușa, the former Soviet spy". Such claims were dismissed by Pintilie himself, who noted that "some comrades in the party leadership" had moved to tone down Dej's zeal: unlike him, they argued that there was little to connect Pătrășcanu with other PCR dissidents into a conspiracy. In a private conversation with Cristina Boico, Pintilie clarified that "some comrades" meant Pauker and her group. Once Pauker had been sidelined, the trial could grow to implicate various other former communists. As reported by Georgescu, the Securitate heads, including Pintilie and Dulgheru, were still quietly opposed to these developments, now "convinced that we had absolutely nothing" on Pătrășcanu.

Pintilie himself attempted to intervene on behalf on one victim, Emil Calmanovici, noting that Calmanovici had once spent "half of his own fortune" in subsidies for the communist underground. According to his own testimony, he was pressured into accelerating the procedures by Chișinevschi, who was especially interested in having Pătrășcanu executed. Apostol contrarily claims that "Pantiușa, acting on his own responsibility", shot Pătrășcanu in his cell at Jilava Prison, thus preventing Dej from issuing a pardon. A similar story was reported in 2013 by a former communist journalist, Nestor Ignat: "it was Pantiușa himself who killed [Pătrășcanu], like he had done with Foriș. He went into his cell and put a bullet through his head [...]. Now, Pantiușa was a Russian asset, so I figure he had his orders directly from Moscow, going over Dej's head". The makeshift, single-shot execution is credited in other sources, including Pacepa, but these contradict the official report, according to which Pătrășcanu faced a firing squad; the report was also corroborated by an eyewitness, Vasile Varga. In 1967, both sets of accounts were contradicted by the suicide note of Securitate officer Iosif Moldoveanu, who claimed to have killed Pătrășcanu by himself.

A number of authors note that Pintilie played a direct part in Gheorghiu-Dej's orchestrated attack on Pauker and Vasile Luca, which saw the latter two sidelined, then persecuted. In a 2001 interview, Pleșiță claims that Pauker's fall contributed in enshrining Gheorghiu-Dej's already great respect for "Pantiușa", who "was not a hundred percent the Russian asset". One other account suggests that Pintilie openly celebrated Pauker's fall, which he reportedly greeted with the words: "Those kikes have been sabotaging our country!" Dulgheru, who was also brought down and sent to jail during the attack on Pauker, remembers that "Pantiușa" had a dual role: though he participated in framing Dulgheru, he wanted no part in the "swindle" (potlogării) affecting Pauker. Drăghici owed his appointment as minister to another ramification of the scandal, which touched Georgescu in 1953. The latter was imprisoned, and confessed to having raped his secretaries and taken a fortune in bribes, but was ultimately released in 1955 and sent to work as a clerk. Luca was the most aggrieved by the fabrication, as a subject of "physical constraints" that included being beaten with an iron rod. As later confessed by his torturers and his co-defendants, his mistreatment had been ordered by Drăghici and by "Soviet advisers", rather than by Pintilie.

In September 1952, Dej had segregated the Securitate from other police agencies, placing it under its own Ministry, and securing his own sweeping powers of that structure. As suggested by Pintilie, Nicolschi, and other members of a review board, it grew to absorb the last independent remnant of the Siguranța—Nicolau's Special Information Service, a counterintelligence unit. The DGSP, now known as DGSS, could rely on 55,000 armed personnel in 1953, with its civilian apparatus increased from 5,000 in 1950 to 19,000 in 1956. In February of that year, Pintilie's commission had extended the maximum legal term for penal servitude to five years, from a previous two. In November 1953, Pintilie and the other junior minister, Ion Vincze, assigned seven Securitate battalions and 50 police dogs to Colonel Coloman Ambruș, for the single purpose of hunting down Ion Gavrilă Ogoranu and his anti-communist guerillas hiding out in the Făgăraș Mountains. The display of force was largely futile, and Ogoranu was still free to engage in hit-and-run tactics during 1954.

=== Political isolation ===
The 1952–1954 period marked a reaffirmation of socialist legality by the Central Committee, which, after ensuring new procedures for arrests, restated that only prosecutors could initiate arrests. The resolution was in practice ignored, with Pintilie once asking the Prosecutor General to send him 20,000 blank arrest warrants. In one of his statements, he also acknowledged that the new regulations acted as a deterrent for Securitate abuse: "Now a prosecutor may enter [the building] as he pleases, can visit someone under arrest or access their files. I would've never dreamed this was possible." At some point during these developments, Gheorghiu-Dej had received a report on the Pitești Experiment from Vintilă Weiss. A former officer of the Securitate, the latter had been arrested by counterintelligence for his contacts with French diplomats; he had passed through Gherla, where the experiment was being replicated, and was hospitalized from the injuries of torture. Alarmed by the Weiss testimony, which threatened the power of intelligence agencies, Internal Affairs ordered Pintilie to report on the matter. The Securitate subsequently attempted a cover-up. As a trial was being prepared in 1953, Colonel Ludovic Cseller was found dead in an apparent suicide. According to documentarian Cicerone Ionițoiu, it is possible that this had been staged by Pintilie and Nicolschi, who wished to preserve secrecy about their own "direct role as instigators". One prisoner, tortured by the Securitate to become a witness for the prosecution, reports seeing Nicolschi directly involved in the effort to obtain confessions.

Writing in 2016, Tismăneanu similarly argued that Pintilie was personally involved in assessing the results of "reeducational" torture; the same author notes that evidence regarding his involvement was not yet available, as much had been "carefully removed" by the perpetrators themselves. Țurcanu and 15 other torturer-inmates were sentenced to death in late 1954, but, as Boldur-Lățescu writes, "the real culprits", Pintilie included, "were never investigated, sanctioned, or sentenced by a penal court." Writer Niculae Gheran, who relies on things heard from a political prisoner, defines Nicolschi and Pintilie as the "stage directors" of the experiment, claiming that the two kept photographs and magnetic tapes showing the results, to replicate if needed. George Pavel Vuza, who served as Deputy Prosecutor General in 1954–1958, recalls that Pintilie and General Gheorghe Bucșan had ordered him to perform an investigation into the various penal facilities. The document he produced in March 1955 described in some detail the poor hygiene, failure to provide basic healthcare, and "miserable food", placing blame for all these on Drăghici; Gheorghiu-Dej took notice, asking for remedial action to be put in motion.

Though he lost his seat on the Central Committee on December 28, 1955, the regime still honored the Lieutenant General, who received the Medal of Labor in 1956, and the August 23 Order, Third Class, in 1959. An attack on Pintilie's work was produced in 1955 by Apostol, who reported to Dej that Pintilie's recruitment drive among the workers was not an improvement: the people brought in "had no appetite for work even back when they were in the factories". As reported by Pleșiță, Pintilie was at the time infringing on Romania's national interest, allowing Soviet companies to mine uranium ore out of Ștei, and using Romanian Army recruits as labor: "General Dumitrașcu [...] was sending reports [on this matter] to Pantiușa (Pintilie), who was a Russian agent. Have a guess as to what effect those reports had". Pleșiță further claims that the party leadership was slow to react, since "Dej could not wrap his head around the uranium issue."

The intended target of Apostol's critique replied with notional self-criticism, such as in December 1957, when he told other DGSS men that: "We shall need to turn our backs on the poor-quality work that we are currently providing, and that we have been providing so far". At that junction, Drăghici and Pintilie were initiating another "reeducation" experiment, centered on Aiud Prison—a facility which, they spuriously claimed, had been transformed into the Iron Guard's "command center". Colonel Crăciun was assigned to lead this new stage, being reportedly instructed by Pintilie in person: "You go there and you kick their asses." During those months, Pintilie became aware that his effort to gather up Guardist informants was seen as distasteful and suspicious by a growing mass of party officials and Securitate officers. As a result, he took distance from his own "method", allowing his disciples to take more initiative—and the associated risks. Crăciun, identified as the main culprit of Aiud, found himself morally superior to the Lieutenant General: "for Pintilie, a human's life or freedom held no more significance than those of just about any living creature".

Pintilie is tentatively identified as "Comrade Penteleev", who, in March 1958, hosted in Bucharest a meeting of Eastern Bloc security services, which is only attested through a report made by Mircho Spasov (from the Bulgarian Committee for State Security). By November, he had intensified Securitate links with the KGB, the Polish Security Service, and other European communist agencies, asking them for reports on the Romanian diaspora, and considering plans for intelligence sharing. As reported by Pintilie himself, Drăghici was incensed by the "leniency and superficiality" displayed by Securitate cadres from the Magyar Autonomous Region, who had failed to anticipate any local ramifications of the Hungarian Revolution of 1956. At the time, "Pantiușa" was allegedly preparing for a purge of the Hungarian minority, producing a list of some thousand ethnic-Hungarian intellectuals who were to be placed in pre-trial detention. His attempt was blocked by János Fazekas, a Hungarian member of the PCR Central Committee. From July 1, 1958, Pintilie also resumed his campaign against religious dissidence, this time by targeting the Union of Seventh-day Adventists. On his recommendation, the Adventist leaders faced a kangaroo court which convicted them on false charges, allowing the Securitate to replace them with informants.

As Gheorghiu-Dej embarked on a political feud with the new Soviet leader, Nikita Khrushchev, and ensured steps toward independence, rumors began propagating which credited Pintilie as a Soviet loyalist. One such account is provided by novelist Marin Preda, who claims that, during Khrushchev's visit to Bucharest, "Pantiușa" (serving as junior minister under "that imbecile Drăghici") was tasked with staging a pro-Soviet coup. Also according to Preda, Khrushchev's plot never stood a chance of success, since the Securitate was being monitored by the Army and the PCR, who now formed a tactical alliance. Although mired in controversy when the Pitești Experiment was curbed by the courts, Pintilie's underlying "method" remained a staple of Securitate activity, into the mid 1960s. In the late 1950s, Dej encouraged a partial De-Stalinization of political life, turning on his former Soviet backers. In 1959, Pintilie was moved sideways from the Securitate, and assigned control of the Miliția. His contributions there included negotiating a treaty on police-force cooperation with the Hungarian People's Republic, for which task he and Drăghici traveled to Budapest in November 1960. During the period of cooperation which followed, Pintilie established a direct line of communication with József Galambos, his counterpart in the Hungarian Ministry of the Interior.

=== Neutralization ===
Pintilie was still a junior minister and active general until January 19, 1963, when he was forced into retirement, collecting a special pension; his daughter maintains however that, rather than being purged, her father had reached retirement age, and was also having health issues. An incident that may have helped Dej decide came in March 1962, after a letter from the disgraced Georgescu. The latter alleged that Pintilie, always "hostile" toward Drăghici, had wanted to make Pauker head of the Special Information Service. Upon reviewing the effects of Pintilie's removal during May 1963, Drăghici reported that the Soviet advisors had also become redundant: "They have had nothing to do since last year, they just sit in their offices and read the newspaper [...]. Back when Pintilie was around, they was [sic] sitting with him in his office and, wouldn't you know it, Pintilie fed them info. There, this is the situation currently, and my view is that we have no longer have any use for these advisers."

August 1963 saw the Romanian Politburo openly discussing ways to "neutralize those Soviet intelligence networks operating on Romania's territory, which Gheorghe Pintilie had coordinated." Reportedly, in November the general secretary asked for, and obtained, a full record of Soviet agents operating in Romania, resulting in a list of 160 names. He then asked his loyalists, including Vasile Patilineț (who oversaw contacts between the Army and the PCR), to make sure that all those included on the list pledge themselves to the Romanian government, renouncing collaboration with the Soviets. Nicolae Ceaușescu, who joined Patilineț's commission, reported that Pintilie's spying was confirmed as a matter of public record, and also that, despite the "hard times", the general continued seeing other Soviet agents, including Vasile Posteucă. While her husband came under suspicion, Ana Toma kept her position in the Central Committee and the Ministry of Foreign Trade—but only to 1965, when Gheorghiu-Dej died. In the resulting reshuffle, she was sent to manage the National Union of Workers' Cooperatives (UCECOM).

In April 1968, the new PCR leader Ceaușescu distanced himself from Gheorghiu-Dej's legacy by ordering an investigation into the Foriș's disappearance and Pătrășcanu's execution; this move also took aim at both Pintilie and Drăghici. That month, Pintilie and Șoltuț found themselves included on a list of Securitate operatives that had used "methods of physical coercion against party members under investigation". According to Foriș's grandson Ștefan Sîrbu, just ahead of the more complex investigation, his family received a nocturnal phone-call from "Pantiușa", who "had gone insane". In confessing to the murder, Pintilie also confirmed to the Forișes that their patriarch was no longer alive, as they had never been explicitly informed that this was the case.

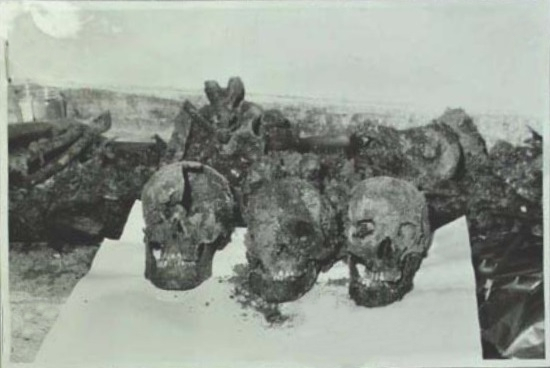
Skulls of Ștefan Foriș and two other of Pintilie's victims, dug up and photographed during the rehabilitation of 1968

In the ensuing rehabilitation process of his victims, Pintilie underwent interrogations by a PCR commission. He spoke about his criminal past, and, though he justified himself through his perfect obedience to the party line, he also admitted that some killings reflected his own "convictions". As Sîrbu notes, documents of the interrogation show that Pintilie had rescinded his earlier confession, and was placing full blame for the Foriș killing on his "Russian driver, who had since escaped from the country." As a member of the investigation team, Răduică reported that, in an oral statement, "Pantiușa" again confessed to being Foriș's first-hand executioner. The definitive confession provided by Pintilie acknowledged that the roles had been distributed as follows: "My driver hit him over the head, just one hit [...] I dug the pit myself, I handled all of that [...]. It was both of us who killed [Foriș and the other two]".

=== Downfall and final recovery ===
Also in 1968, Ceaușescu made a show of his opposition to the Soviet invasion of Czechoslovakia, and prepared the Romanian population for resisting one such punitive incursion. Mihai Viorel Țibuleac, who was part of Ceaușescu's security detail during these events, reports that: "Each and every party session had discussions concerning Pantelei Bodnarenko, or Pantiușa, as a traitor to this country, one who was greatly detrimental for Romania." Upon the end of the crisis, although formally sidelined and expelled from the party ranks, Pintilie still received the occasional honor. One such situation came in 1971, when he was awarded the Order of Tudor Vladimirescu, Second Class. Those acknowledged in the same manner included Ana Toma, as well as dramatist Aurel Baranga; the latter's presence allowed for the circulation of a malicious pun, referring to the ceremony as Ranga și Baranga ("The Crowbar-anga"). As noted by Jela, this popular joke, "worthy of the history books", should be credited to Jean Coller, a second-rank PCR cadre "who appears to have also been decorated that day".

Reportedly, in 1971 Pintile was also quietly readmitted into the PCR—effectively, this was his own rehabilitation, marked with a ceremony that he refused to attend. According to Apostol's hostile account, such gestures were Ceaușescu's way of thanking Pintilie for not having implicated him in Dejist crimes. Overall, none of the disgraced Securitate men were ever subject to a "criminal investigation into their past and there was not much investigation into the abuse done against ordinary citizens either." As reported by historian Nicoleta Ionescu-Gură, Pintilie was shielded from prosecution by the expiring statute of limitations. Another historian, Ioan C. Popa, writes that, in the period after 1968, "some of [Pintilie's] former comrades" attempted to "diminish his responsibility and to have him viewed as a 'mere executor' of orders received from above." This ambiguous status was also underscored when his wife remained a favorite of Elena Ceaușescu, who insisted that she be recognized as belonging to the most prestigious class of women in the nomenklatura.

The Pintilie family occupied a three-bedroom house at 24 Grigore Mora Street (in Aviatorilor quarter), until moving out in 1974. "Neither completely annihilated nor entirely forgiven", beginning in 1979 the Securitate general found himself placed under constant surveillance by his former subordinates. Deletant describes Pintilie's final decades as "solitary, drunken stupor." The same is recounted by Tismăneanu, who describes Pintilie, now isolated in his new home on Kiseleff Road, as falling back into a "state of prostration, alcohol-driven apathy and feigned amnesia". The same author alleges that "Pantiușa" was allowing himself a familiarity with anti-communist messages, tuning into Radio Free Europe "for hours on end." The aging Pintilie also agreed to have interviews with Câmpeanu, who was interested in documenting the reasons behind Ceaușescu's ascent. As reported by his guest, he was downplaying claims that Dej had ever groomed Ceaușescu as his successor.

General Pintilie had raised his two adoptive children as atheists—while allowing them some exposure to his in-laws' staunchly Orthodox Judaism. He outlived his boy, Radu, who died at some point in the late 1970s or early 1980s, but saw his daughter, Ioana, training as an architect. He did not object to her marrying a Jewish man and following him to Israel, though he always missed her presence. The former Securitate chief died in Bucharest on August 11, 1985. Oprea believes that this happened at a villa in Primăverii, "after a long and solitary drinking binge, an unfiltered cigarette always hanging in the corner of his mouth, down to his final hours." Such accounts are partly corrected by Ioana, who reports that her father was brought down by heart and lung issues which had begun during his prison years. By the time of his death, he had suffered four preinfarctions.

== Legacy ==
Pintilie was buried with full honors at the Ghencea Military Cemetery. He was survived by his daughter, Ioana, who trained as an architect and remained in Israel. Ana Toma lived through the anti-communist revolution of 1989 and died in 1991, alone and almost completely blind. "Pantiușa" himself preserves a negative image with the Romanian public and scholarly community. A fictionalized version of him appears briefly in Gabriela Adameșteanu's 2010 novel, Provizorat, where he rapes a female prisoner, the Iron Guard-sympathizing Sorana. The same year, Constantin Popescu Jr. released his film Portrait of the Fighter as a Young Man, noted for highlighting Pintilie as the main villain, and for accurately depicting his methods.

Câmpeanu suggests that, like Georgescu, Pintilie was Dej's man within the "forces of repression", helping the Caransebeș prison faction (rather than the larger PCR) establish full control over Romania. As rated by Tismăneanu, Bodnarenko and Nicolschi were "Soviet spies", whose cooperation with Dej remains key in understanding how the Securitate and state terrorism could emerge in Romania. He argues: "Communist crimes were carried out by real-life humans (if we may call them humans). Pantiușa was one of these great criminals." In a 2007 interview, Ioana Pintilie (married Constantin) defended her adoptive father and mother against such verdicts: "it hurts me that people who had known these two folks never wrote so much as a phrase about there being some humanity to them".
