= Ana Toma =

Romanian politician (1912–1991)

- Born: Ana Grossmann; 9 October 1912; Botoșani, Kingdom of Romania
- Died: January 1991 (aged 78); Romania
- Employer(s): NKVD; Ministry of Foreign Affairs of Romania; National Union of Workers' Cooperatives
- Political party: Romanian Communist Party
- Spouse(s): Sorin Toma; Gheorghe Pintilie
- Partner: Constantin Pîrvulescu
- Children: 2
- Awards: Order of the Star of the Romanian Socialist Republic, 2nd class Hero of Socialist Labor

Ana Toma (née Grossmann, 9 October 1912 – January 1991) was a Romanian communist and politician who served on the Central Committee of the Romanian Communist Party (PCR) and was first deputy secretary of the Ministry of Foreign Affairs of Romania. She was married to Securitate General Gheorghe Pintilie and the two exerted influence on the PCR leader, Gheorghe Gheorghiu-Dej. She was sometimes referred to as Anuța to distinguish her from Ana Pauker, herself also known as "comrade Ana."

== Early life ==
Toma was born as Ana Grossmann to Jewish bourgeois parents on 9 October 1912 in Botoșani, Kingdom of Romania. Due to her Jewish ancestry Toma was interned during World War II, but survived the war.

== Romanian Communist Party ==
Toma was an underground communist activist before the outbreak of World War II, and joined as a member of the Romanian Communist Party (PCR) in 1932. After the war, she was an agent of the People's Commissariat for Internal Affairs (NKVD, the interior ministry and secret police). She also became a highly visible asset of the PCR's agitprop section, where she worked under the propagandist Leonte Răutu.

During the trial of communist activist Remus Koffler in April 1954, who had been caught up in the downfall of communist politician Lucrețiu Pătrășcanu, Toma served as a witness.

When her close friend Ana Pauker became secretary-general of the Ministry of Foreign Affairs of Romania in November 1947, Toma was appointed as first deputy and as Pauker's personal administrative secretary. Toma was directly involved in helping Pauker's father Herș Rabinsohn to embark on a Jewish migrant ship bound for Mandatory Palestine, which was kept secret from others in the Communist party leadership. She accompanied Pauker on trips to Moscow, and also travelled to Peiping (now known as Beijing) in 1958 to attend the opening ceremony of the Romanian Economic Exhibition in the People's Republic of China.

Toma was deputy minister until 1965, surviving the political purge of Pauker over her views on agricultural collectivisation and her political "right deviation."

In 1965, Toma was reassigned to manage the National Union of Workers' Cooperatives (UCECOM). She also served on the Central Committee of the PCR.

== Personal life ==
Toma's first marriage was to communist and journalist Sorin Toma, who was editor in chief of the party's official daily magazine Scânteia. She settled with him in Bucharest, but their marriage ended when he was exiled to the Soviet Union. She kept her husband's name after the end of the marriage.

In 1942, Toma began a relationship with Constantin Pîrvulescu, who was ranked third in the PCR leadership at the time and who became the General Secretary of the Romanian Communist Party.

Toma married for a second time to intelligence officer and Securitate General Gheorghe Pintilie. It has been alleged by several historians, such as Dennis Deletant, that she either spied on her husband or existed as a supervising link between the Ministry of State Security (MGB) and his offices. Câmpeanu recalls that they formed a "bizarrely non-homogeneous couple", beyond their shared dislike for Ștefan Foriș. Toma had a Jewish-and-bourgeois background, being congenial, adaptable, and intelligent; Pintilie, meanwhile, was "structurally dogmatic, primitive, obtuse, [...] as inflexible as he was dull." The couple resided at 24 Dr. Grigore Mora Street. They adopted two children: Radu, who died in the 1970s, and Ioana, who became an architect in Israel.

== Death ==
Toma lived through the Romanian anti-communist revolution of 1989 and died in January 1991 in Romania, by which time she was almost completely blind.

== Awards ==
- "The Fifth Anniversary of the Romanian People's Republic" medal (24 December 1952) "for the struggle and work carried out in order to create, consolidate and prosper the Romanian People's Republic."
- "40 years since the founding of the Communist Party of Romania" medal (6 May 1961) "for long-term activity in the labour movement and special merits in the work of building socialism."
- Order of Labor, 1st class (5 November 1962) "for long-term activity in the labour movement."
- Order of the Star of the Romanian Socialist Republic, 2nd class (18 August 1964) "for special merits in the work of building socialism, on the occasion of the 20th anniversary of the liberation of the homeland."
- Hero of Socialist Labor
