= Miliția (Romania) =

Police force of the Communist Romania

Militia Miliția

Agency overview
- Formed: January 1949
- Preceding agencies: Gendarmerie; Romanian Police
- Dissolved: December 27, 1989
- Superseding agency: Romanian Police; Gendarmerie

Jurisdictional structure
- National agency (Operations jurisdiction): ROU
- Operations jurisdiction: ROU
- Legal jurisdiction: Romania
- General nature: Civilian police

Operational structure
- Headquarters: Bucharest

The Miliția was the police force of the Socialist Republic of Romania.

== Establishment and structure ==
The Miliția was established by decree in January 1949; the decree simultaneously disbanded the Romanian Police and Gendarmerie, considered “bourgeois” institutions. It was part of the Interior Ministry and directly controlled by the ruling Romanian Workers’ Party. Its employees held military rank.

Of the initial 35,000 members, 161 were university graduates, 9,600 had completed fourth grade or less, while 7,800 had six or seven grades of schooling. Meanwhile, the existing police were purged of pre-1945 Siguranța agents beginning in 1948, when over 1000 were imprisoned; informers were retained. By 1951, 98% of the old policemen had been expelled, imprisoned or killed. Miliția reproduced the Militsiya of the Soviet Union, and received ideological guidance from an advisor sent by the latter country.

The same decree set up the Alexandru Ioan Cuza Police Academy, which became Miliția Officers’ School, recruiting from among workers, Miliția or army troops and junior Miliția officers. Selection was based on recommendations from party bosses. Proper class origins and proven devotion to party policy were required. A written test was administered, but could be ignored with the right connections. Starting in 1950, regional Miliția schools trained junior officers for four months. Regular policemen underwent two months of training. They were recruited by local Miliția and party structures from among retired army troops and workers up to age 25 who had completed military service.

== Heads ==
- Pavel Cristescu (1949–1952)
- Gheorghe Pintilie (1959–1960)
- Stelian Staicu (1960–1969)
- Jean Moldoveanu (1973–1978)
- Constantin Nuță (1978–1989)

== Reputation and evolution ==
Junior officers were often seen on the streets by the public, who came up with jokes about them. It was often said they were uneducated, violent and ill-intentioned. They frequently abused their power, extorting food, drink and other benefits. They found or invented legal pretexts to interrogate citizens, whom they treated without restraint. Alongside the Securitate secret police, the Miliția was the regime’s main instrument of control against society. It employed violent repression: arrests, investigations, torture, imprisonment; psychological terror: maintaining a massive network of informers, coordinating a system of diversion and disinformation, threats, blackmail; pressure on the economic and administrative state apparatus.

In its early years, the Miliția was concerned with issuing residence permits. By late 1952, no urban resident was allowed to change residence without permission from a Miliția officer. The permit bureaucracy facilitated Miliția’s task of supervising people’s movement, monitoring those hostile to the regime and preparing internal deportations. The institution's powers gradually expanded under the Nicolae Ceaușescu regime. A 1969 law charged it with “defending the revolutionary gains of the people and its peaceful work in building socialism”; the powers conferred were open to multiple abuses.

A 1970 decree, toughened in 1976, empowered Miliția to combat “social parasitism”, allowing its officers to jail or fine people found on the street during work hours. Both measures were open to abuse. A 1983 decree required registration of typewriters, while a 1985 measure enhanced anti-abortion policy, so that the societal role of Miliția was ever greater in the years leading up to the Romanian Revolution.

Miliția were formally transformed into standard Police (Poliția) on December 27, 1989. However, given the continuity of personnel, its mentality persisted for at least a decade.

== Ranks of the Miliția Română ==
Generals: General Colonel, General Locotenent, General Major Officers & NCO's: Colonel, Locotenent Colonel, Maior, Capitan, Locotenent Maior, Locotenent, Sub Locotenent, Plutonier Adjutant, Plutonier Maior, Plutonier, Sergent Major, Sergent Militiamans: Milițistul
