= Caransebeș Prison =

Prison in Caransebeș, Romania

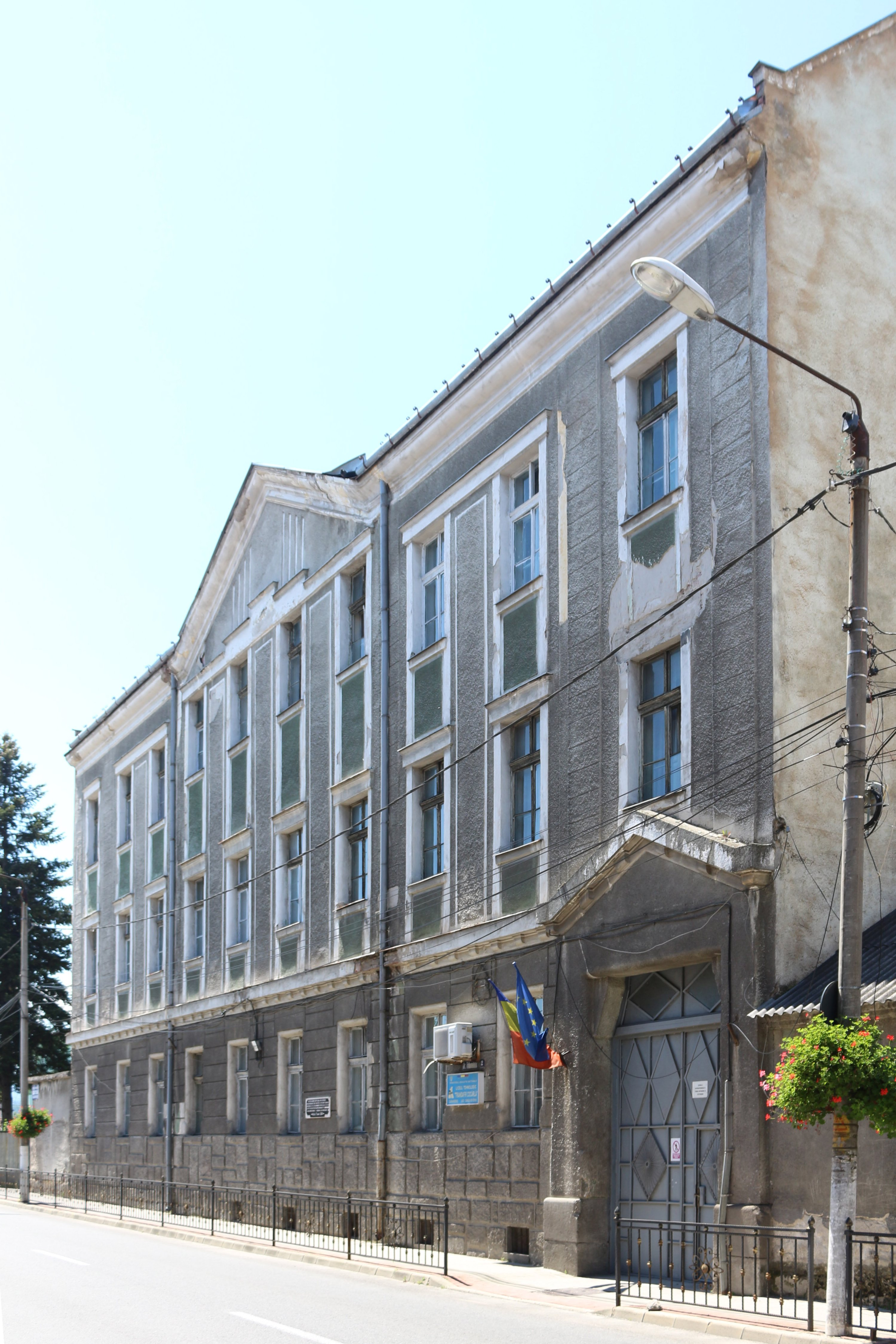

The Caransebeș Prison was a prison in Caransebeș, Romania.

The prison was built in 1911–1913, under Austria-Hungary, with a capacity of 500. Built of stone and brick in a U-shape, it had thick walls. The ground floor contained housing for the guards, a visiting area and workrooms. An infirmary, a small library, a barbershop and the warden's apartment were on the first upper floor. The cells were on the three upper floors, with three to thirty beds, usually bunked. The storerooms were in the basement. There were two yards, one for walks and the other for gardening, electricity and showers on the ground floor. Common criminals, thieves and murderers, were held there until 1941. That year, under the Ion Antonescu regime, those accused of communist activity and espionage began to be sent there. There were around 150–200 prisoners belonging to this category, part of them previously held at Doftana Prison, which collapsed in the 1940 Vrancea earthquake. Until the 1944 coup, prisoners included Gheorghe Gheorghiu-Dej, Chivu Stoica, Miron Constantinescu, Nicolae Ceaușescu, Alexandru Drăghici, Ion Vincze, Emil Bodnăraș, Teohari Georgescu, Iosif Chișinevschi, Ana Pauker, Gheorghe Pintilie, Athanase Joja, and Pavel Câmpeanu.

The future politburo of the Romanian Communist Party, aside from Lucrețiu Pătrășcanu and those who lived in Moscow during World War II, was composed of former Caransebeș inmates. Some 20-30 women, sentenced for communist activity in Chișinău, were also sent there and partly isolated. Iron Guard affiliates were kept in total isolation in 1942–1943. Around 40 of the communist prisoners were Jewish, and most were sent to Transnistria Governorate from 1942. Accused communists had a certain freedom of movement inside the prison; they worked in the shops, formed relationships, sent messages to communists outside the prison and introduced propaganda materials, which if found would result in an isolation that was not too strict. The workshops, open eight hours a day, specialized in carpentry, polishing furniture, carving stone, lathing wood, making boots and iron objects, painting (the latter was led by Ceaușescu for a time). They were allowed to sell their products in front of the prison: toys, cigarette cases, chessboards, boxes. The communist prison leaders would then negotiate how to split the profits with the prison administrators; the income was not declared.

Some prisoners worked in the garden or on building Caransebeș Airport. Others washed clothes or performed agricultural labor. Poor nutrition often led to vitamin deficiencies and painful sores. Prisoners were allowed food packages of up to 20 kilograms. They had to keep their windows open at all times. A prison doctor was in attendance. The communists had good relations with the prison leadership, allowing Gheorghiu-Dej to smuggle in a radio, allowing him to monitor the progress of the war. He shared a cell with Stoica and Drăghici, who formed a command nucleus; their contact with other prisoners was not restricted. Starting in 1943, a Romanian Orthodox priest held sporadic services in the yard. One evening in late 1941, the anniversary of the October Revolution was celebrated by performing Nikolai Gogol’s Government Inspector.

Caransebeș held between 120 and 145 common criminals at a time from 1944 to 1947. From 1948 to 1952, their number rose to 315-350. Among these were political prisoners charged with sabotage, such as Emil Hațieganu, Silviu Dragomir, and Anton Dumitriu. Fourteen to eighteen prisoners were crowded in each cell. Rule violations led to prisoners being shackled and kept in strict isolation. Nutrition was very poor, a few hundred calories per day. In 1953, there were 620 prisoners: around 60% were accused saboteurs, the remainder “counterrevolutionaries”. Of the 385 prisoners in 1954, 35% were under Securitate detention, without a court conviction. After 1955, the prison only held common criminals such as thieves or vandals. Between 1945 and 1948, there were 51 escapes, with the number subsequently falling sharply. The workshops continued to operate, producing tens of thousands of brooms and brushes per year. Members of the Romanian anti-communist resistance movement active in the Banat Mountains passed through the prison. A number of executions took place inside the prison, including three partisans shot in August 1951; there are reports of mass graves nearby.
