= Order of Tudor Vladimirescu =

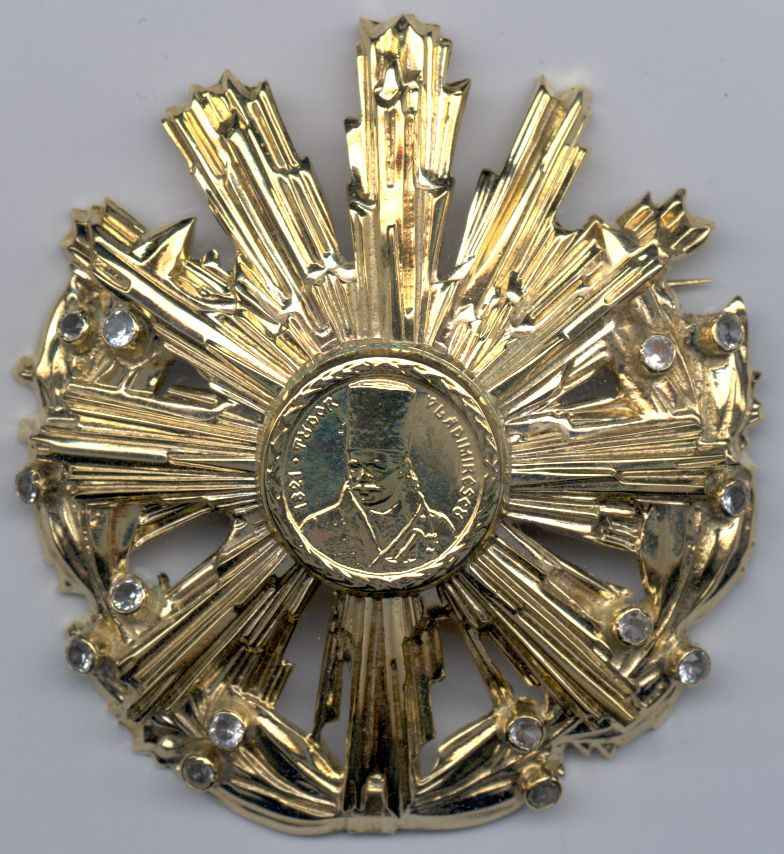
- Type: single-grade order
- Awarded for: Heroism in combat
- Presented by: Socialist Republic of Romania
- Eligibility: Romanian and foreign citizens, military units and formations, military schools, and institutions
- Status: No longer awarded
- Established: April 13, 1966
- Ribbon of the award

The Order of Tudor Vladimirescu (Romanian: Ordinul Lui Tudor Vladimirescu) was a state award of the Socialist Republic of Romania. It was at the time the third highest order in the republic. The award came in 5 degrees.

== Description ==
Established by Government Decree No. 272 of April 13, 1966. Named in honor of the leader of the Wallachian Uprising of 1821, Tudor Vladimirescu.

The following citizens of Romania were awarded :

- for special merits achieved in various spheres of political, military, economic, scientific and cultural activity;
- enterprises, organizations, institutions, military units and settlements for special services to the motherland;
- citizens of other states who have made a significant contribution to the development of friendship and cooperation with the Socialist Republic of Romania.

Has five degrees and a medal of two degrees. Since 1966, for a short period of time, the practice was to award the Order of Tudor Vladimirescu, first degree, on shoulder ribbons, as well as on neck ribbons for diplomats.

== Gallery ==
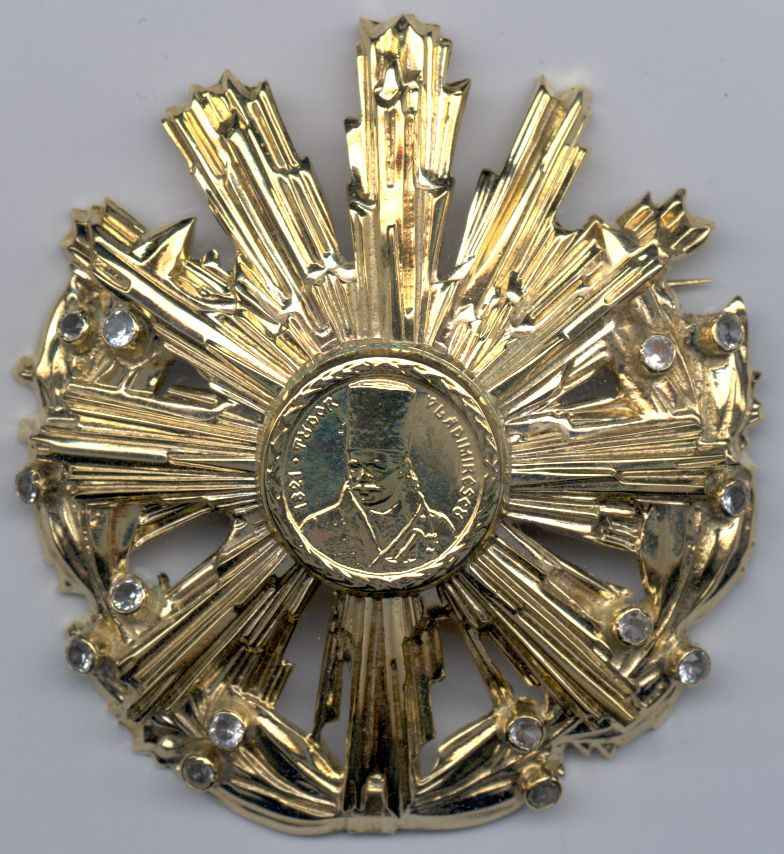
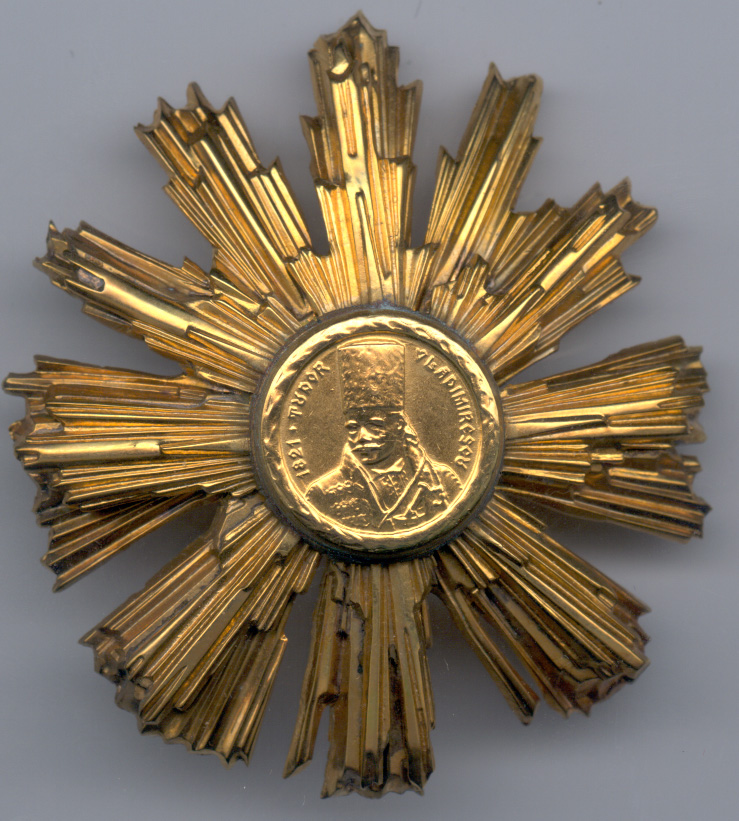
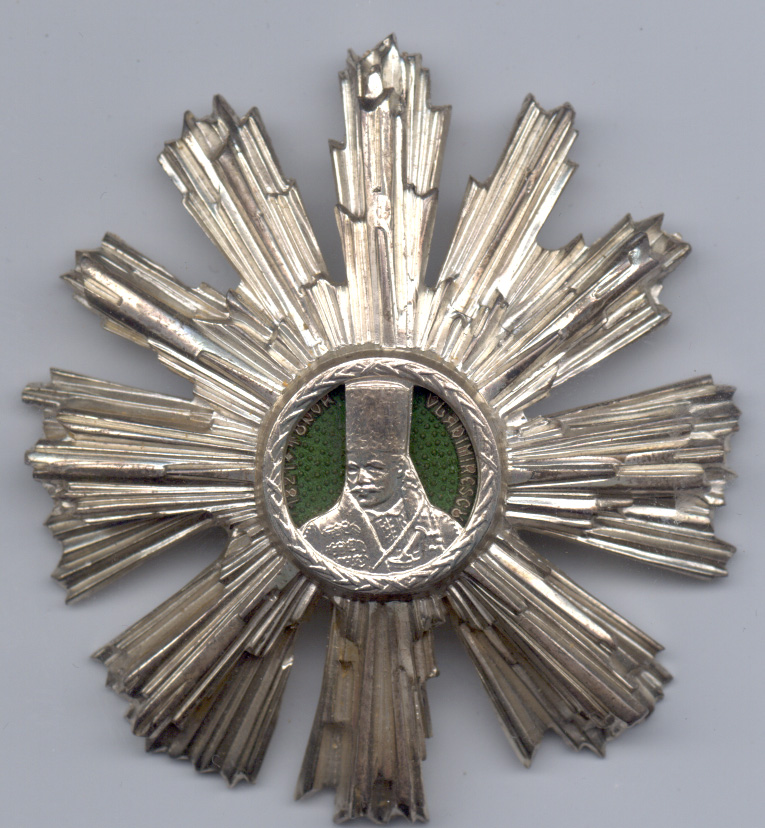
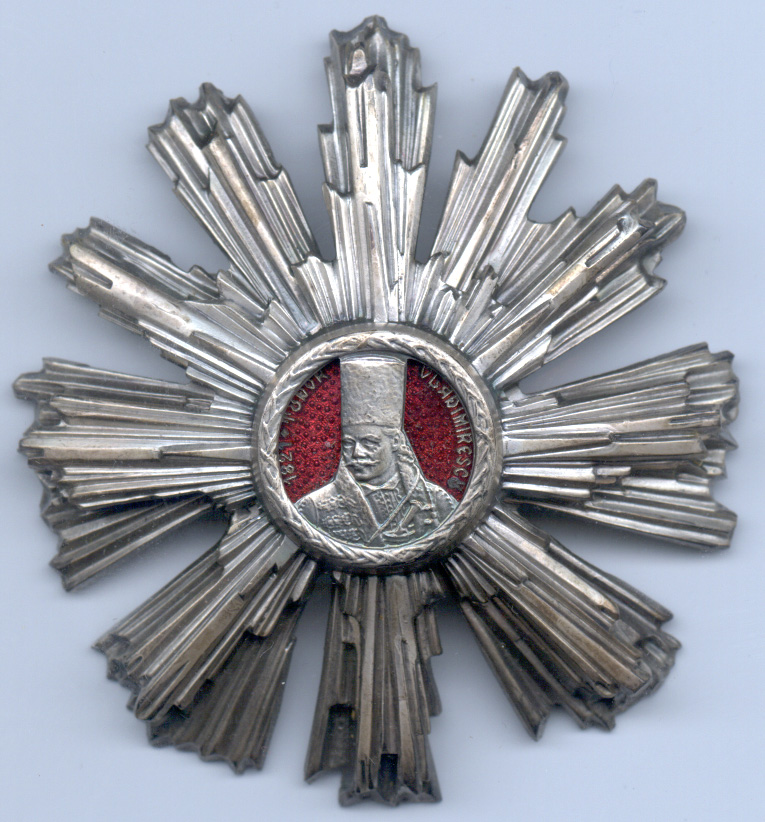
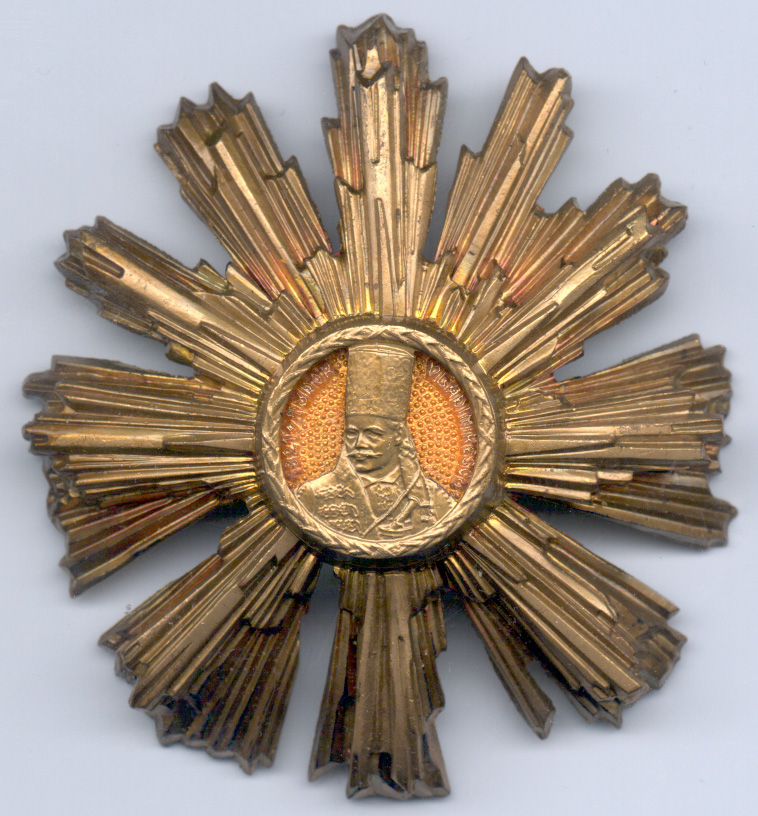

1st Degree
2nd Degree
3rd Degree
4th Degree
5th Degree

== Notable recipients ==
=== Romanian ===
- Ștefan Voitec (1966)
- Alexandru Graur (1971)
- Gheorghe Pintilie (1971)
- Alexandru Nicolschi (1971)

=== Foreign ===
- Vasily Petrov (1974)
- Tengku Ampuan Afzan (1982)
- Ahti Karjalainen

== See also ==
- Orders, decorations, and medals of Romania
