= Serghei Nicolau =

Romanian communist activist and intelligence officer

Head of the Second Department of the Romanian General Staff
- In office March 1954 – 27 November 1960

Head of the Foreign Intelligence Directorate of the Securitate
- In office 9 January 1951 – March 1954
- Preceded by: Himself (as Director of the Special Intelligence Service)
- Succeeded by: Vasile Vâlcu

Director of the SSI (Special Intelligence Service)
- In office 9 January 1947 – April 1951
- Preceded by: Lucian Stupineanu
- Succeeded by: Office abolished

Personal details
- Born: Sergey Nikonov; September 22, 1905 Izmail, Bessarabia Governorate, Russian Empire
- Died: March 19, 1999 (aged 93) Bucharest, Romania
- Party: Romanian Communist Party
- Spouse: Nina Nikonova
- Awards: Order of the Star of the Romanian People's Republic

Military service
- Allegiance: Romanian People's Republic
- Branch/service: SSI; Securitate; Army of the Socialist Republic of Romania
- Years of service: 1947–1963
- Rank: Lieutenant general

Serghei Nicolau (born Sergey Nikonov; 22 September 1905 – 19 March 1999) was a Romanian communist espionage chief and a Securitate general.

== Biography ==
An ethnic Russian, Nicolau was born on 22 September (or 5 November) 1905 in Izmail, in the Bessarabia Governorate of the Russian Empire, the son of Ion and Ecaterina. According to other sources, he was born in Cacica, Duchy of Bukovina, Austria-Hungary. He also called himself at various times Serghei Nicanov or Sergiu Nicolau.

Like his future boss Emil Bodnăraș, he was recruited by the NKVD. This occurred in 1922, when he was sent to study in Belgium and France as an agent of the Comintern. His studies abroad, in Brussels and Marseille, were paid for, and in the latter city, he was part of the local French Communist Party leadership. In 1931, on behalf of the Soviet Intelligence Service, he came to Romania, where he became a member of the Romanian Communist Party (PCR). He was expelled from the Chemistry faculty of the University of Iași, for attending meetings of the banned PCR. At some point, he deserted from the Romanian Army and left for the Soviet Union. In June 1935, Nicolau took over the management of a spy ring that operated on the territory of Bessarabia. In December 1937 he was arrested with the entire ring (including his brothers, Alexandru and Valerian Nicanov) and was sentenced to hard labor for life for having collected and transmitted to the GRU secret military information. In prison, he spent part of his sentence alongside another NKVD agent, Gheorghe Pintilie. While at Doftana Prison, the two belonged to a group of Soviet agents around future PCR leader Gheorghe Gheorghiu-Dej.

After the coup d'état of 23 August 1944, Nicolau was placed in various positions within the Allied Control Commission (Soviet side). During that time, he re-established contact with colonel Nikolai Petrovich Zudov, the chief of NKVD operations in Romania. Following the arrest of Nicolae Stănescu, he was appointed Director General of the Romanian Secret Intelligence Service (SSI), which he headed from 9 January 1947 to 6 January 1953. Guided by Bodnăraș, he worked to recruit loyal agents, both within the agency and in the Romanian Army. In consultation with the local Soviet espionage bureau, the pair reorganized the SSI into four bureaus: foreign information, supervision of diplomatic missions in Bucharest, domestic information and counterespionage activities. His chief of staff, Mikhail Gavrilovich, and his personal security guard, Valerian Buchikov, were both MGB officers. In October 1949, the former communist Minister of Justice Lucrețiu Pătrășcanu and his wife, Elena, were handed over to the SSI for questioning on the personal order of Gheorghiu-Dej, acting on instructions from Aleksandr Sakharovsky, the chief MGB adviser to the Ministry of the Interior. Nicolau tasked Petre (Petr) Gonceariuc, the head of the Counterespionage Directorate of the SSI, with Pătrășcanu's interrogation, with the purpose of establishing his connection with foreign espionage agencies through the intermediary of Lena Constante.

The Soviet handlers were not content with only training and assisting Securitate officers, but they actively started recruiting some of them. Nicolau protested this practice to Gheorghiu-Dej, who refused to intervene, since he was seeking at the time the support of the Soviets in his campaign against the Ana Pauker faction of the PCR. As a result, Nicolau was removed as head of the SSI on 6 January 1953, and replaced by Vasile Vâlcu; according to Pintilie, he was punished by the Soviets "in some way that remained between them." On 1 April 1953, Nicolau transferred to the information services of the Ministry of Defense. From March 1954 until 27 November 1960, Nicolau, who held the rank of lieutenant general, led the military espionage bureau of the Romanian General Staff, after which he was head of the Control Department at the Ministry of National Defence, until he retired in December 1963.

He was married to Nina, née Bogaliubov (born 28 February 1906 in the Russian Empire), herself a Soviet agent in the 1930s. In the early 1950s, she was Gheorgiu-Dej's personal secretary. The two lived in the Primăverii district of Bucharest (a neighborhood largely restricted to the communist nomenklatura), on Grădina Bordei Street (now Jean Monnet Street), right across from where Bodnăraș resided. He died in Bucharest on 19 March 1999.

== Bibliography ==
- Oprea, Marius (2012). Bastionul cruzimii. O istorie a Securității (1948–1964). Editura Polirom. ISBN 9789734624980.
