= Dennis Deletant =

British-Romanian historian

Dennis Deletant OBE
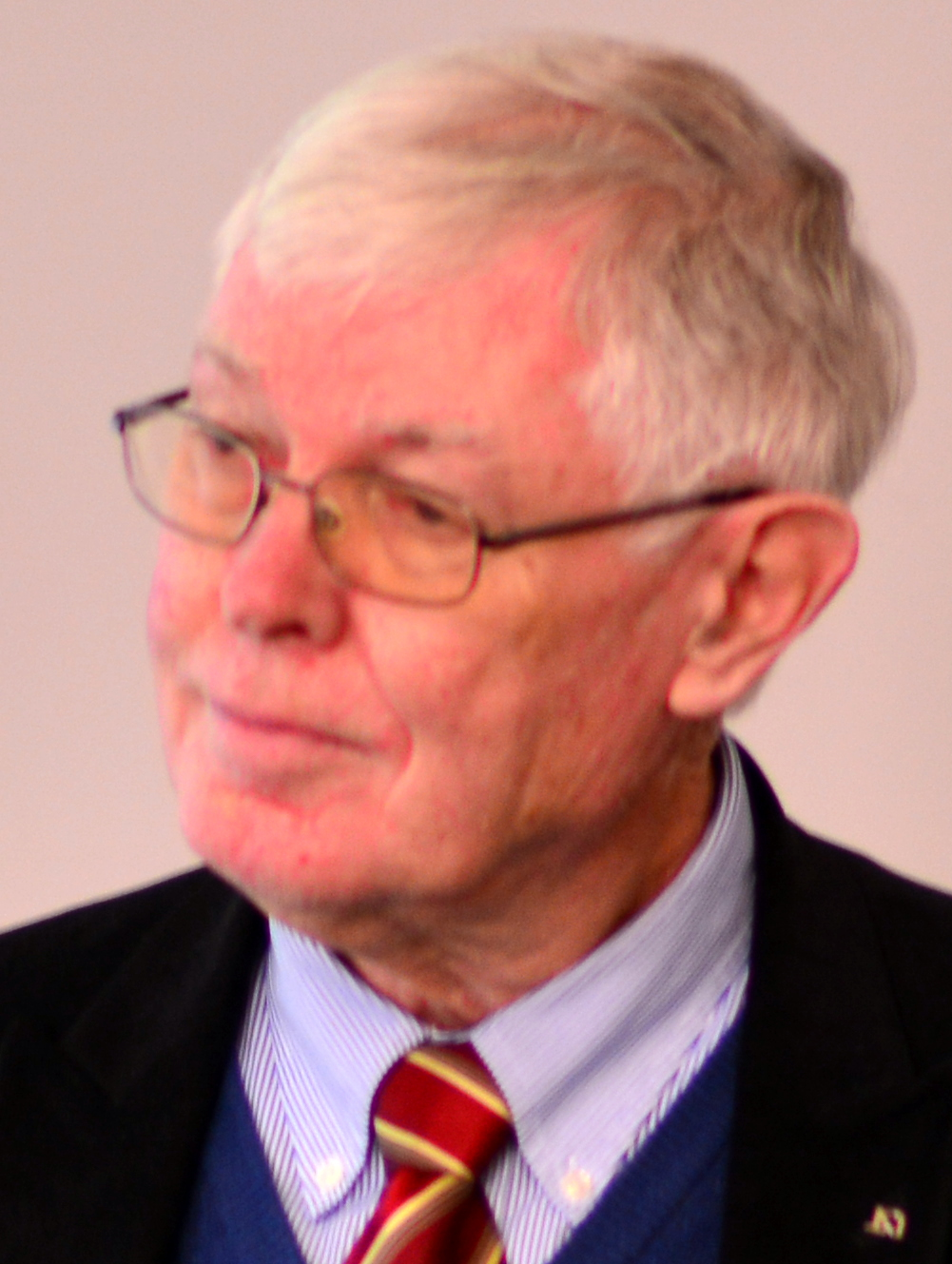
- Dennis Deletant in 2019
- Born: 5 March 1946 (age 80); Norfolk, England, United Kingdom
- Citizenship: British, Romanian
- Occupation: Historian
- Awards: Order of the British Empire; National Order of Merit (Romania), Commander rank Order of the Star of Romania, Officer rank

Academic background
- Education: University of London

Dennis Deletant OBE (born 5 March 1946) is a British-Romanian historian of the history of Romania. As of 2019, he is Visiting Ion Rațiu Professor of Romanian Studies at Georgetown University and Emeritus Professor of Romanian Studies at the UCL School of Slavonic and East European Studies (SSEES). He is the author of numerous works on the history of Romania including Ceaușescu and the Securitate: Coercion and Dissent in Romania, 1965-89 (London; New York, 1996); Romania under Communist Rule (Bucharest, 1998); Communist Terror in Romania: Gheorghiu-Dej and the Police State, 1948-1965 (London; New York, 1999); and Ion Antonescu: Hitler's Forgotten Ally (London: New York, 2006).

Deletant had been persona non grata in Ceaușescu's Romania, but on 31 December 1989, in the immediate aftermath of the Romanian Revolution—there was still some sniper fire, etc.—Deletant entered Romania at Giurgiu as the only Romanian-language speaker in a BBC crew coming in from Bulgaria, joining another BBC team already in Bucharest and, in what he was later to describe as his Warholian "fifteen minutes of fame," reported on the subsequent events.

== Academic career ==
In 1964, he enrolled at the University of London as a student of Romanian. At SSEES, Deletant successively held the positions of Assistant Lecturer in Romanian Language and Literature (from 1969), Lecturer in Romanian Language and Literature (from 1972), Senior Lecturer in Romanian Studies (from 1988), Reader in Romanian Studies (from 1993), and Professor (from 1996).

Besides his longtime affiliation with SSEES, Deletant served from 1990 to 1999 on the board of the British Government's ‘Know-How Fund for Central and Eastern Europe’. He was actively involved in that organization's work in Romania and in the Republic of Moldova, was Rosenzweig Family Fellow at the Center for Advanced Holocaust Studies at the United States Holocaust Memorial Museum in 2000 and 2001, and was Professor of Romanian Studies at the University of Amsterdam (on secondment from UCL) from 2003 to 2010.

== Awards ==
He was made an officer of the Order of the British Empire in 1995 and was awarded the Order of Merit with the rank of commander for services to Romanian democracy in 2000 by President Emil Constantinescu of Romania. In 2016 he was awarded by President Klaus Iohannis the Order of the Star of Romania, Officer rank.

He has also been awarded a number of Honorary Degrees from different Academic Institutions.

== Partial bibliography ==
- Romanian by Dennis Deletant and Yvonne Alexandrescu. (New ed.) London: Teach Yourself, 2003. ISBN 034086852X
- Romania under Communist Rule. Center for Romanian Studies together with Civic Academy Foundation, 1999, ISBN 973-98392-8-2.
- Ceaușescu and the Securitate: Coercion and Dissent in Romania, 1965-1989. M.E. Sharpe, 1995, ISBN 1-56324-633-3.
- Communist Terror in Romania: Gheorghiu-Dej and the Police State, 1948-65. C. Hurst & Co. Publishers, 1999, ISBN 1-85065-386-0.
- New Evidence on Romania and the Warsaw Pact, 1955-1989. CWIHP e-dossier #6, published on CD-ROM for the conference Romania and the Warsaw Pact, Cold War International History Project of the Wilson Center, Bucharest, October 2002.
- Security Intelligence Services in New Democracies: The Czech Republic, Slovakia and Romania. With Kieran Williams, Studies in Russian and East European History and Society, Palgrove, 2001, ISBN 0-333-71372-9.
- Hitler's Forgotten Ally: Ion Antonescu and His Regime, Romania 1940–1944. Palgrave MacMillan, Basingstoke 2006, ISBN 1-4039-9341-6.
- British Clandestine Activities in Romania during World War II, Palgrave, London and New York, 2016, ISBN 1-137574518
- Romania under Communism. Paradox and Degeneration Routledge, Abingdon and New York, 2019 ISBN 9781138707429
