= Siguranța =

Pre-Cold War Romanian secret police

Directorate of Police and General Safety Direcția Poliției și Siguranței Generale
- Middle coat of arms of the Kingdom of Romania, used by state authorities.
- Common name: Siguranța Statului

Agency overview
- Formed: March 25, 1908
- Dissolved: 30 August 1948
- Superseding agency: Department of State Security

Jurisdictional structure
- National agency: ROU
- Operations jurisdiction: ROU
- General nature: Secret police

Operational structure
- Headquarters: Bucharest
- Parent agency: Ministry of Administration and Interior

Siguranța (Romanian: lit. 'Safety') was the generic name for the successive secret police services in the Kingdom of Romania. The official title of the organization changed throughout its history, with names including Directorate of the Police and General Safety (Romanian: Direcția Poliției și Siguranței Generale), the Secret Intelligence Service (Romanian: Serviciul Secret de Informații), the Special Intelligence Service (Romanian: Serviciul Special de Informații) or simply the Intelligence Service (Romanian: Serviciul de Informații),

== History ==
Created in 1908, in the aftermath of a major peasant revolt, it acted as a political police, monitoring, infiltrating and trying to dismantle political groupings considered undesirable by the government. Changing its structure several times during the first half of the 20th century, it was disbanded in 1948, when Romania became a people's republic. Siguranța's role, as well as many of its employees, were integrated into the newly founded Department of State Security ("Securitate").

Around 1924, Siguranța secret intelligence assassinated a leader of the militant wing of the Romanian Communist Party. The victim was also the brother of dedicated Communist Elizaveta Zarubina, soon to become one of the USSR's most crucial agents. A secret policeman came to her apartment in Bucharest later the same year to arrest her; he was subsequently shot by Zarubina, attracting the attention of top Soviet intelligence officials.
