= Flondor =

Flondor is a Romanian surname. Notable people with the surname include:

- Florica Racovitză-Flondor (1897-1983), Romanian composer
- Gheorghe Flondor (1892–1976), Romanian politician
- Iancu Flondor (1865–1924), Romanian politician
- Tudor Flondor (1862-1908), Romanian composer and politician
- Tudorel Flondor (1929–1952), Romanian chess master
