= Nicolae Dabija (soldier) =

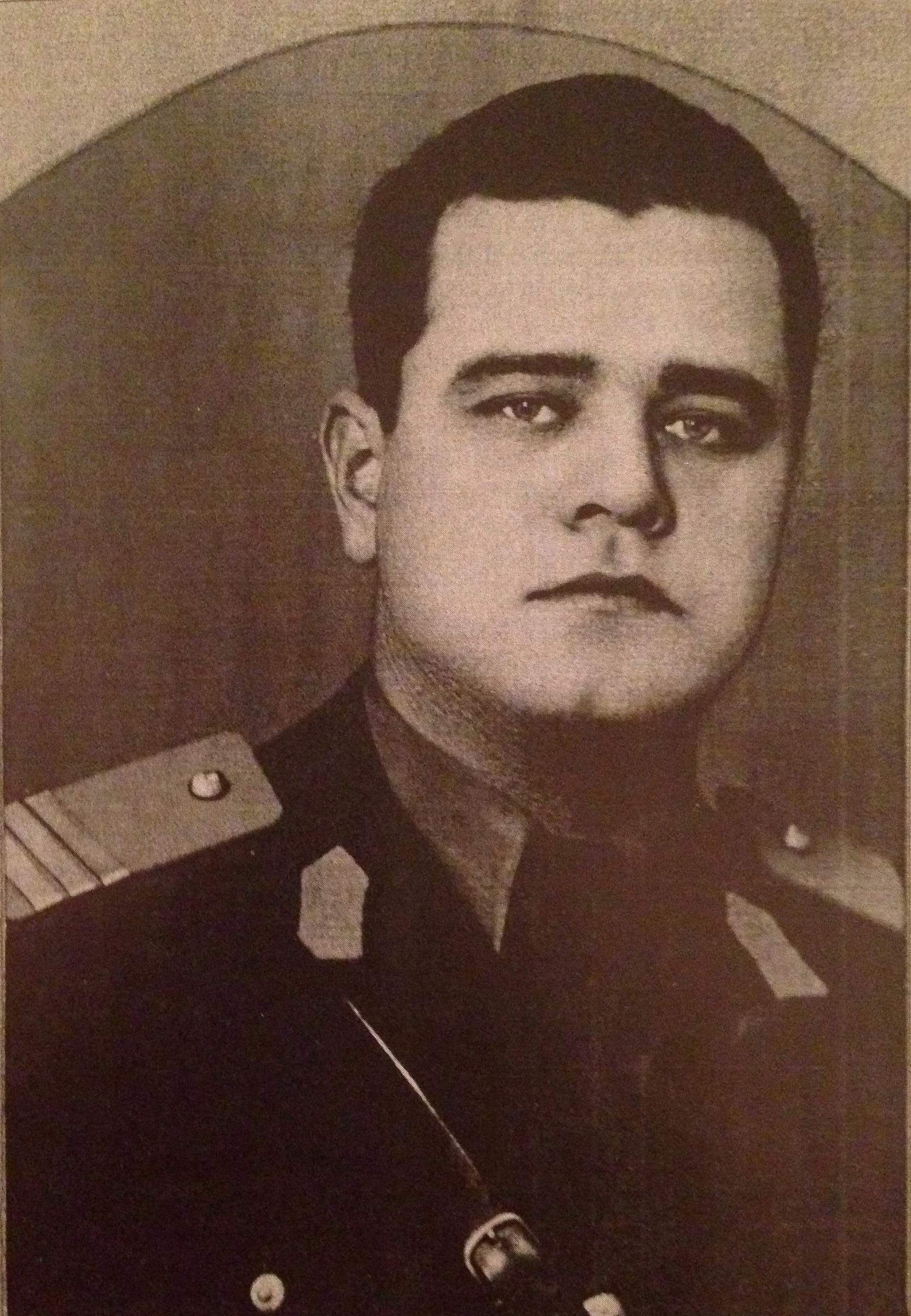
- Nicolae Dabija, around 1930
- Born: 13 April 1907; Galați, Kingdom of Romania
- Died: 28 October 1949 (aged 42); Sibiu, Romanian People's Republic
- Burial place: Sibiu Municipal Cemetery, Romania
- Education: Military School for Infantry Officers in Sibiu
- Military career
- Allegiance: Kingdom of Romania
- Branch: Army
- Service years: 1926–1946
- Rank: 2nd Lieutenant (1929); 1st Lieutenant; Captain (1941); Major (1943)
- Conflicts: World War II; Eastern Front; Battle of the Kerch Peninsula; Battle of the Caucasus; Crimean offensive
- Awards: Order of the Crown, Knight rank Order of the Star of Romania, Officer rank Order of Michael the Brave, 3rd class German Cross, in Gold
- Other work: Leader of the National Defense Front resistance group (1948–1949)

Major Nicolae Dabija (born April 13 or 18, 1907; died October 28, 1949), knight of Order of Michael the Brave, was an officer of the Romanian Royal Army and a member of the anticommunist armed resistance in Romania. He was the leader of the "National Defense Front–The Haiduc Corps" resistance group in the Apuseni Mountains.

== Early life ==
Nicolae Dabija was born in April 1907 in Galați, in the historical region of Moldavia, eastern Romania. (Some sources claim he was a cousin of Gheorghe Gheorghiu-Dej.) His father, a carpenter, died when he was 9 years old, and he was raised in poverty. After starting his studies at Vasile Alecsandri High School, he dropped out at age 15 and became employed at a local bank. In 1926 he voluntarily enlisted into the Romanian Army, at the 13th Dorobanți Regiment in Iași. Encouraged by his superiors, he enrolled in the local Military High School for a year, after which he went to the Military School for Infantry Officers in Sibiu, graduating in 1929.

== Service in World War II ==
In May 1941 he was awarded the Order of the Crown, Knight rank. Soon after, on June 22, Romania joined Operation Barbarossa in order to reclaim the lost territories of Bessarabia and Northern Bukovina, which had been annexed by the Soviet Union in June 1940. Dabija served as an officer in the Romanian Land Forces, participating in the Axis invasion of the Soviet Union. On October 15, 1941, Captain Dabija was sent to the Eastern Front in command of the 5th Company/38th Infantry Regiment from the 10th Infantry Division. In February 1942 he took part in the Battle of the Kerch Peninsula, where his company helped stop a Soviet landing at Ossereyka; for his actions in this battle he was awarded the Order of Michael the Brave, 3rd class with spades, and the German Cross in Gold. He further distinguished himself at the Battle of the Caucasus and during the Crimean offensive in 1943–44. Promoted to Major, he was wounded twice, and finally evacuated back to Romania. In October 1944 he was awarded the Order of the Star of Romania, Officer rank for feats of arms on the battlefield.

== The National Defense Front ==
At the end of the war, in June 1945, Dabija was awarded by royal decree for a second time the Order of Michael the Brave, 3rd class. In July 1946 he retired from the army. In view of the royal awards he had earned, Dabija was given 5 hectares (12 acres) of land near Aradul Nou, where he settled together with his wife. According to historian Dorin Dobrincu, he went into hiding, fearing arrest as the Soviets occupying Romania deemed him a war criminal for his participation in the war against the Soviet Union. Liviu Pleșa, however, notes that his decision to join the anti-communist movement was prompted by the arrest of his brother (who was incarcerated at Jilava Prison) and his denunciation by local communists after a dispute over statements he had made in opposition to the regime.

In February 1948, Dabija met the brothers Traian, Alexandru, Viorel, and Nicolae Macavei, the nephews of Ștefan Cicio Pop. The Macaveis were wanted for gold smuggling, having killed two gendarmes and wounded four others. Together with them, he formed and armed group called the National Defense Front, sometimes also known as the Haiduc Corps. He issued a proclamation against the “Jewish–Communist clique”, calling for freedom, independence, and respect for human rights. Convinced that a new world war would soon break out between the Americans and the Soviets (Vin americanii!), Dabija reached out in May 1948 to the United States authorities through several intermediaries, offering help with military actions to liberate Romania, only to be rebuffed. He developed a plan aiming at an armed insurrection in 1949, when the US–Soviet war was expected to begin. The goal was to occupy government institutions, armament and ammunition depots, as well as strategic points, such as the defiles of the rivers Mureș, Someș, Olt, Prahova, and Dorna. Dabija's group created and spread anticommunist fliers and set up an information network in Bucharest.

The National Defense Front started recruiting sympathizers in the Apuseni Mountains, in the Roșia Montană–Zlatna gold-mining area. The organization operated on the eastern flank of the Apuseni Mountains, around Muntele Mare (the "Great Mountain"), near Bistra and Câmpeni. In the fall of 1948, a resistance group settled on the mountain, where they built a fortified shelter (a "casemate"); supporting groups were set up, with a network of sympathizers providing information about the authorities’ actions. On December 22, 1948, resistants from this group, armed with a rifle and handguns, robbed the Tax Office in Teiuș of some 300,000 leis, from which they later procured more arms and a typewriter.

== Arrest and execution ==
The Romanian authorities learned about the location of Dabija after arresting a partisan fighter, Traian Ihuț, who revealed the location of his group on Muntele Mare and their strength. Immediately after, on March 4, 1949, a detachment of 80 Securitate troops from Cluj led by Colonel Mihai Patriciu charged the peak where the fighters were located, with a gunfight and later hand-to-hand combat occurring. Eleven anticommunist fighters were killed, but Dabija and two others managed to escape; the Securitate forces suffered three deaths and three others wounded. His wife, Flavia, was reportedly killed during the firefight. By some accounts, this was the biggest battle between an anti-communist resistance group and the Securitate.

Dabija was arrested on March 22, 1949 in Gârde, after a local villager, whose barn he was sleeping in, notified the communist authorities of his presence. All partisans and their aides were captured. They were subject to interrogation in Turda, Bucharest, and Sibiu. Later they were tried and convicted through sentence no. 816 of October 4, 1949 of the Military Tribunal of Sibiu. In the early hours October 28, 1949, seven members of the group (Titus Onea, Ioan Scridon, Gheorghe Oprița, Traian Mihălțan, Augustin Rațiu, Silvestru Bolfea, and Nicolae Dabija) were executed at the Reformed cemetery in Sibiu by firing squad. Just before being shot, Dabija exclaimed, "Long Live Romania!" The bodies of the executed were thrown in a common grave in Dumbrava Sibiului. The execution was supervised by the director of the Sibiu branch of the Securitate, lieutenant colonel Gheorghe Crăciun; he sent a report the next day to colonel Mișu Dulgheru, the head of the Ministry of Internal Affairs's penal investigation unit.

In 2004, the remains of Dabija and the 6 other executed partisans were identified and properly re-buried at the Sibiu Municipal Cemetery, and a monument dedicated to the "Anti-communist fighters – Major Nicolae Dabija group" was erected on the spot. In 2010, a team of investigators from the Institute for the Investigation of Communist Crimes in Romania led by Marius Oprea found the casemate built by Dabija's partisans on Muntele Mare, as well as the remains of 5 of the fighters killed by the Securitate troops who stormed their compound in 1949.
