= Iași Prison =

Prison in Iași, Romania

Coordinates: 47.181°N 27.559°E

Iași Prison is a prison located in Iași, Romania.

From the mid-19th century until 1950, the main prison in Iași was located in the former monastic cells at Galata Monastery. The site was chosen because of its walls, seven meters high and crenellated. In the late 1920s, the military section from Galata was moved to the present prison building, which had been a grain and feed deposit. Prior to the 1944 coup d'état, both common criminals and political prisoners were held at Galata. Corneliu Zelea Codreanu spent seven months there in 1924–1925, awaiting trial for murder. Several other Iron Guard members were detained there, including Ion Moța. They complained about conditions inside: poor food, dirt, damp walls, cold and a wide variety of insects. Cadres of the banned Romanian Communist Party held there include Gheorghe Gheorghiu-Dej, Ion Niculi and Ilie Pintilie.

Between 1946 and 1948, twenty-four prisoners escaped, after which the number dropped sharply. Memoirs mention mock executions in the cemetery at Galata, violent interrogations at the hands of the Securitate secret police and unbearable cold, sometimes augmented by snow blowing in through the window. In 1950, the civilian prison moved to the present location in the Copou district, merging with the military prison, where ten political prisoners were incarcerated at the time. There were three large cells each fitting tens of people, six medium and five small. The normal capacity was 125, with a maximum of 350. The building was subsequently expanded in order to handle an anticipated inflow of inmates. Iași was often a transit prison for men, women and minors on the way to Botoșani or Suceava.

After 1944, both political prisoners and common criminals were held at Iași; the latter always predominated. The population peaked at over 1000 in 1958, of whom 275 were political. There were considerable fluctuations, from 229 in 1952 to 17 in 1956. Twelve were left by 1961, with the last one released in 1964. Overcrowding, sometimes causing prisoners to sleep on the cement floor, was a persistent problem and led to hygiene issues. Among the inmates were Corneliu Baba and Antonie Plămădeală. An unknown number of executions took place: for instance, Victor Lupșa, commander of an anti-communist resistance movement unit, was shot in December 1956. A camp for boys aged 14 to 18 operated inside the complex; a 1955 inspection found the bathrooms destroyed and the inmates in tattered clothing.
