= Nicolae Moromete =

Romanian prison warden and Securitate colonel (1912–?)

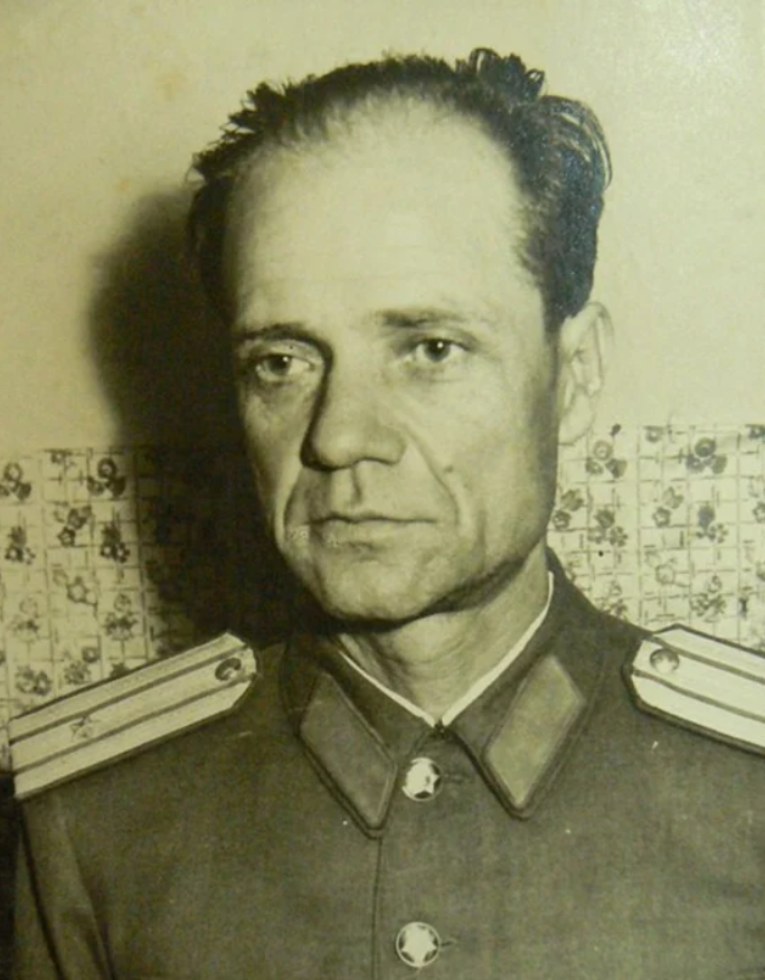
- 1950s photograph
- Born: 13 May 1912; Valea Ungureni, Argeș County, Kingdom of Romania
- Died: After 1959
- Military career
- Allegiance: Kingdom of Romania; Romanian People's Republic
- Branch: Romanian Land Forces (1929–1944); Securitate (1947–1959)
- Service years: 1929–1935; 1941–1944; 1947–1959
- Rank: Corporal (army); Colonel (Securitate)
- Nickname: Maromet
- Conflicts: World War II; Eastern Front; Siege of Odessa; Crimean campaign; Defense of the Don Bend; Siege of Budapest
- Awards: Valor and Faith Medal (c. 1943); Star of the People's Republic (1949)

Nicolae Moromete, widely known as Maromet or Maromete (13 May 1912 – ?), was a Romanian communist activist, prison official, and Securitate officer, infamous for his role in political repression under the communist regime. He was born to a poor peasant family in the west of Muntenia, and was orphaned by World War I. He worked menial jobs and had only a primary-level education. As a teenager, he joined the Romanian Land Forces, eventually becoming skilled in handling field telephones. Returning to civilian life later in the interwar, he worked as a street sweeper and as a janitor in Bucharest. He was deployed with his army unit for most of World War II: he initially served on the Eastern Front, where he earned a medal; after the anti-fascist coup of 1944, he saw action against Nazi Germany.

During the mid-to-late 1940s, Moromete observed the ascent of the Romanian Communist Party, joined its ranks, and trained as a political commissar. Though interrupted by allegations of sexual misconduct, his own rise was confirmed in 1947–1948, when he entered the Securitate branches handling political prisoners. He became infamous during his time as warden of Jilava (1949–1952), when he introduced varied and widespread methods of torture, personally intervening in humiliating and beating up his captives; his criminal negligence possibly led to the deaths of various high-profile inmates, including Mircea Vulcănescu. Moromete applied similar methods as warden at Galați (1952–1954); here, he was subject to a formal investigation over claims that he had caused the deaths of many other prisoners, but the prosecutors dropped the case. In his defense, he stated allegations against other Securitate officials, suggesting that he had always been threatened by them not to show any mercy.

Still subject to formal warnings, Moromete was sent to work in a secondary position at Văcărești Prison. He was however fully reintegrated and, in 1956–1958, presided over the Chilia Veche labor camp, giving him control over large portions of the Danube Delta. The high death rate of such facilities, and additional revelations about his acts of cruelty, pushed the Securitate to investigate. He was quietly removed from active duty, then disappeared from public records—without ever having been put on trial. Prison survivors maintained a hope that he would eventually be captured, while conserving his image in works of literature and folklore. Several sources suggest that he was spotted working as a cinema usher, while one rumor has it that he was killed off by common criminals.

== Biography ==
=== Early life ===
Nicolae Moromete was born to destitute farmers in Valea Ungureni, then part of Argeș County (currently in Olt County), on 13 May 1912. He was the youngest of five brothers. They were all orphaned soon after, when their mother Maria died (the father, Gheorghe, had already fallen in the campaigns of World War I). The boy graduated from the village primary school. Though he later recalled that nobody had helped him during his stay there, he became the only one of his family who could even read and write. He then worked in Valea Ungureni as a swineherd and day laborer. Hostile accounts by his victims suggest that Moromete had a stutter. In such records, he is also described as a "Gypsy" or a Gagauz by birth. Former inmate Remus Radina suggests instead that he was a Romanian, though one who stood for "the very dregs and scum of this nation". The "Moromete" surname, famously but coincidentally used throughout Marin Preda's 1950s novel, is Romanian, and geographically linked to areas of Muntenia and Oltenia. The warden was widely known as "Maromet" or "Maromete". Though officially registered as "Moromete" in the 1950s, he is believed by historians Mircea Stănescu and Dumitru Lăcătușu to have originally used the surname "Maromet".

In 1929, the young man went to Pitești, enlisting as a camp follower in the Romanian Land Forces (6th Artillery Regiment). In 1934–1935, Moromete did his regular military service, with the 11th Transmissions Battalion in Bucharest. Upon his honorable discharge, he failed to return home—and instead found a job as a street-sweeper. He was sacked in 1937, after a dispute with a better-positioned colleague. By his own account, he had refused to pay up a bribe in order to keep his job. The Bucharest city government allowed him back, and then promoted him to janitor.

Moromete was again drafted in 1941, when the Romanian Kingdom, governed by Ion Antonescu, had formed an alliance with Nazi Germany. As such, Moromete served with distinction on the Eastern Front. Returning to 11th Transmissions Battalion, Moromete operated field telephones in the siege of Odessa, the Crimean campaign, and the defense of the Don Bend. For his courage under fire, he received a "Valor and Faith" medal. During wartime, Moromete liked to boast that he had fought in skirmishes with the Soviet partisans, but his battalion commander, Colonel Săceanu, and a fellow soldier both clarified during a 1952 inquest that no such fighting had taken place. Săceanu additionally recalled that Moromete used to depict himself as a Holocaust perpetrator, claiming to have killed several Soviet Jews—lining them up so that four or five of them could be shot with a single bullet; Săceanu himself did not believe that this was true.

According to a testimony provided by another fellow soldier, "Maromet" was persuaded by Soviet propaganda that the war was useless, and suggested that they collectively surrender to the Red Army. While he sees the claim as doubtful, Lăcătușu argues that it speaks to the quickly changing loyalties of the rural and urban underclass. Eventually, the anti-fascist coup of August 1944 saw Romania engaged alongside the Allies, and Moromete serving against both Germany and Nazified Hungary. In late 1944, he and his unit reached Budapest. The Soviet occupation of Romania, meanwhile, facilitated the rise of the Romanian Communist Party (PCR, later PMR). Lăcătușu and journalist Diana Popa both describe Moromete as one in a class of natural-born communist torturers, attracted into the movement, and its violent side, by the promise of social recognition. Discharged from the army as a corporal and returning to work as a janitor, he joined the PCR in 1945, being one of the first city-hall employees to make that move. His recruitment was arranged by Boris Rancev, who believed that Moromete would help him confront the Yellow Sector's "inimical elements", grouped around a former mayor, Alex Iorgulescu.

Moromete graduated from a school for political commissars, and in short time, was named secretary of the PCR Yellow-Sector chapter. Upon infiltrating the local administrative apparatus, he intercepted letters that a mayoral clerk had sent to the British Embassy, and presented them to Rancev. In 1946, the PCR's mayoral sections came to be supervised by the Ministry of Internal Affairs (MAI), itself led by communist Teohari Georgescu. Sent in to assist in the process, Coman Stoilescu found that Moromete was "attached to the working-class struggle", but was also alarmed by one act of brutality: Moromete had arrested a suspected profiteer, whom he then paraded around town with a sign tied to his neck. In 1947, he was assigned commissar in the Corps of Municipal Guards. His activity had been poorly rated by PCR superiors, who accused him of immorality in office. More specifically, he allegedly promised advancement to cleaning ladies, in exchange for sex. The PCR leadership had him removed, and he was forced to undergo retraining at a party venue in Constanța. He was then made ideological instructor of the prison guards, subordinate to the MAI—with this, he began his involvement with the penal system. By 1948, he was a salaried head guard at Văcărești Prison. In March 1949, as the communist regime was taking hold and mass imprisonments of political opponents began, he was made first-level guard of Jilava Prison. He was then promoted to commander of the guard.

=== Jilava warden ===
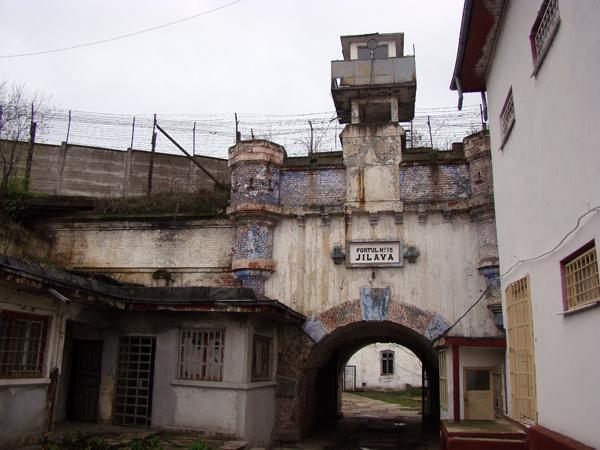
Jilava Prison's Fort 13, photographed in 2011

Holding the rank of Securitate captain, Moromete became warden of Jilava in May 1949. As "Maromete Nicolae", on 23 August 1949 he also received the Star of the People's Republic for his outstanding services to the Securitate. During his tenure, he was assisted by officers Alexandru Vișinescu and Traian Ivănică, as well as by others (known only as Fătu, Geamănu, Gutman, and Sabău). As head of this hierarchy, Moromete was ordered by the PMR and the Prison Directorate to decrease living standards, to apply corporal punishments, and to prevent prisoners from receiving mail. He himself acknowledged this in an explanatory memorandum of 1955. Various reports suggest that he applied himself to such tasks with unusual zeal, personally beating his inmates and addressing them with profanities.

Jilava inmate Constantin Cesianu recalls that all new prisoners were made to run the gauntlet, which was Moromete's way of introducing himself and his team. Other forms of corporal punishment followed them throughout their prison experience. Gabriel Țepelea of the opposition National Peasants' Party reported having been tied to a punishment bench that Moromete and his subordinates carried around with them. They would use maces on their victims, only setting them free when they were crying in pain. As Țepelea recounts, Dimitrie Bejan, a Romanian Orthodox priest, confounded Moromete by quietly enduring the ordeal. Moromete's speech impediment made him hard to understand at times, but he tried to obtain his victims' undivided attention by carrying around a hoe handle, with which he bludgeoned those who did not respond in time. In several instances, he lined the inmates up and jumped over them on horseback.

The prison population was generally more educated than Moromete, and sometimes mocked his lack of self-awareness. A story passed on by Richard Wurmbrand suggests that he once unwittingly revealed that, under socialism, people guilty "of nothing" would still go to prison, but for less than ten years. In one other instance, he had seen a motto from Seneca scribbled on the walls of a cell. Enraged, he asked Seneca to step up and account for his actions; since this failed to happen, one of the incarcerated students informed him that Seneca had left the facility, but that he was expected to return. In similar vein, Radina describes an encounter between the warden and Iosif Jumanca, a detained former activist of the Romanian Social Democrats. Moromete was initially infuriated that Jumanca described himself as a founder of Romanian socialism, but later agreed to hear him speak. The two of them had a clash of visions, once Jumanca opined that Marxism-Leninism was flawed. Moromete decided to end this episode by having his men beat up the naked Jumanca, who, fearing for his life, shouted his agreement with their ideological interpretation.

Moromete habitually spied on conversations: detainees who were heard expressing hopes that the Americans would land were picked out, severely brutalized, and sent to recover on top of garbage piles. Favorite targets of his included former officials of the Antonescu regime. According to anti-communist author Grigore Caraza, he would routinely round up such men, in particular those who had served in the army, and watched as they were being beat up. Caraza claims that these beatings caused the death of General Iosif Iacobici. Researcher Virgil Ierunca and philosopher Petre Țuțea believe that "Maromet" was partly responsible for the death of an Antonescu-era politician and scholar, Mircea Vulcănescu, by making him subject to a harsh regimen. Vulcănescu died at Aiud Prison, but from a pneumonia that, as both Ierunca and Țuțea note, could have been treated during his time at Jilava. In one other instance, Moromete personally ordered the arrest of 27 militiamen. According to an eyewitness testimony, after two Yugoslavs had managed to escape Jilava, he forced all remaining prisoners to run the gauntlet. He then locked the inmates in sealed rooms, bringing them close to suffocation. Jilava prisoner Gheorghe Marin reported that the overall conditions in Fort 13 were always squalid, with an "un-breathable air" and mold accumulated on the humid walls.

=== Galați relocation ===
Moromete's behavior came under official scrutiny in November 1950. A classified MAI report of that month informed that he and Ivănică had beaten up two prisoners. As Lăcătușu observes, the act itself was not condemned, but found to be unjustified in that particular case. By 1951, the communist regime was more closely reexamining some of the Securitate excesses, in particular by investigating the re-education experiments at Pitești Prison. Radu Ciuceanu, who had experienced that treatment was dispatched with other survivors at Gherla, while the PMR pondered how to deal with the scandal. He was asked to meet two plainclothes Securitate men, who told him that Western capitalists and the Iron Guard had infiltrated prisons, in order to stage brutalities and compromise communism; in his retort, Ciuceanu asked them if anyone could seriously believe that Moromete was an American spy. An additional link with the re-education program was briefly acknowledged by the Securitate's internal investigator, Mișu Dulgheru. Upon investigating reports of Moromete's abuse, he was told that the warden had created a room in which specially-trained prisoners brutalized their less conformist colleagues.

Moromete lost his command at Jilava in April 1952. His subsequent absence was largely seen as ushering in a period of relaxation for its prisoners. Psychologist and Jilava inmate Nicolae Mărgineanu, who links his ouster with Georgescu and Ana Pauker's downfall, writes that all beatings ended after that moment—with cruelty now centered on starvation and humiliation. Sent back to Jilava in 1955–1956, Ciuceanu noted that the "ritual" of body searches went quicker "after warden Maromet had been sent away". The same author heard an inmate mockingly complaining that the facility was no longer fun without the warden's insults (which he described as "true anatomical depictions and works of folklore"), and that the new staff were merely "clerks".

Moromete himself was briefly warden at Caransebeș, before taking on a similar assignment at Galați (1952–1954). Constantin Răutu, who was employed there as his political commissar and accompanied him on night-raids, acknowledged in 2007 that any prisoners caught using the tap code were bastinadoed. Moromete's activity came to be scrutinized by local prosecutors from May 1953, when they followed up on a complaint from the former inmate Ilie Simionescu. The latter reported on how Moromete had trebled the prisoners' workload, after accusing them collectively of being "appeasers" of the bourgeoisie, while also reducing their rations (particularly for those who had tuberculosis) and keeping them out in the cold. Some were made to harvest reeds in the local swamps, with little protection against the elements. Some of the human food was reportedly used to feed a herd of pigs.

Simionescu believed that, through this regimen, up to five prisoners had died each day. The civilian authorities eventually dropped the investigation, suggesting that the case could only be handled by military prosecutors. The latter weighed in only briefly: some urged for Moromete to be relegated, but others insisted that he was "an honest comrade". As Lăcătușu observes, the Securitate's own panel of investigators never expressed an interest in whether the methods were in fact legal, instead praising Moromete for his prisoners' productivity. They also justified the pig-feeding act by noting that the animals in question were not Moromete's own, but rather belonged to the prison itself. In assessing the death toll, they argued that five prisoners died at Galați monthly, rather than daily. At the end of the inner-Securitate dispute, Moromete was issued a final warning.

Made a Securitate colonel, Moromete was nonetheless kept under close observation. As an informal punishment while his case was being reviewed, he became the deputy warden at Văcărești (1 October 1954–1 July 1956). Both his direct superior, Lieutenant Colonel Marin Constantinescu, and his political supervisor, Dormidont Lungu, left written complaints about his incompetence, his boorishness, and his mental decline. As the more lenient Constantinescu noted, he was at all times worried, and had once shown himself perturbed that his former colleagues were being called up to describe his "cases of beating and other things"; the warden asked that Moromete still be viewed as "honest and devoted to the regime", suggesting that he be assigned to work outside the prison system. In Ierunca's assessment, Moromete still "reigned upon" Văcărești, being in part responsible for its severe overcrowding.

=== Chilia Veche and downfall ===
During 1955, Moromete was fully sidelined by party officials, and made subject to investigation by the Prison Directorate. In that context, he reminded his superiors that they had vetted all his measures. Moromete also claimed that, back in 1949, Constantinescu himself had warned him not to show any mercy toward the inmates, as doing so would have resulted in his own arrest. He is however known to have had positive incentives: at Jilava, his monthly pay was set at 17,450 lei, which was more than fifty times the average national salary. In mid-1956, Moromete received his new assignment, as commander of Chilia Veche labor camp. Lăcătușu proposes that he was being actively protected by his superiors, who made sure he escaped prosecution. Immediately upon arrival, he introduced his usual methods of control and punishment, applying beatings on a scale that surpassed all of his past experiences. In that context, the civilian population of Chilia Veche began expressing concerns about the constant wailing coming out of the camp. In prisoner circles, the Danube Delta as a whole was coming to be described as "Maromet's Country"; in that context, he was spotted managing the extremely harsh complex at Periprava. Late records showed that most of the prisoners he received in the isolated Chilia Veche were already infirm, and that he may have staged their steady extermination, including by pushing them to suicide; under his watch, the camp had an inexplicably high number of deaths. Here too, Moromete increased the workload, effectively doubling it.

The investigation into Moromete's past was resumed in 1958, after the Securitate heard reports that he and his subordinates had whipped an entire colony of Delta prisoners, "to the point where they soiled themselves". Moromete's own right-hand man, Aurel Dumitrescu, came forward with an incriminating statement, indicating that the commander had set punitive solitary confinement to 15 days, which exceeded the maximum allowed by five days. Dumitrescu also acknowledged that Moromete had pressed him into joining his team of physical torturers. The final investigative commission, headed by Moromete's old friend Coman Stoilescu, verified the warden's brutality, but again implied that it was unjustified, rather than criminal in itself. It also chided him for placing the prisons' reputation at risk.

On 28 February 1959, Moromete was removed from active duty. Though he preserved pension rights, he was officially listed as a regular MAI pensioner, and did not enjoy the perks of a former warden. According to Ciuceanu, the prisoners were aware that his final sacking was mainly because he had abused his own staff. It is not precisely known what happened to Moromete. Some of his former victims claimed to have spotted him working as a cinema usher in Bucharest, and this is presented as a fact in several standard biographies. According to Popa, "he died without ever facing trial for the crimes he committed." A former prisoner, Sergiu Popescu, believes that he was "assassinated, perhaps by common-law prisoners".

== Legacy ==
Moromete passed into prison folklore, where, in addition to the anecdotes, his Chilia Veche victims dedicated him a song, with mention of his cruelty. Despite disappearing from public life, he endured as a symbol of oppression. The exiled dissident Paul Goma mentions him as such in the 1971 novel Ostinato, where one character expresses the hope that "Maromet" would eventually be sent to a Romanian "Nuremberg". In Romania, excerpts from Sergiu Dan's diaries appeared in Steaua magazine in 1973, and included some mention of Dan's time in communist jails; these included a note about his three days "in Maromet's black box", with personal musings about how such suffering did not equate martyrdom. Moromete's character could be explored in his home country after the Romanian Revolution of 1989. His subordinate at Galați, Constantin Răutu, was indicted for genocide in 2007; aged 81 at the time, he denied having engaged in any wrongdoing. In 2011, Lucian Dan Teodorovici published a political novel, Matei Brunul, in which the former warden makes appearances, and is exposed for his brutality.
