= Constantin Ticu Dumitrescu =

Romanian politician (1928–2008)

Romanian Senator
- In office 1992–2000

Member of the College of the National Council for the Study of the Securitate Archives
- In office 2005–2008

Personal details
- Born: Constantin-Grigore Dumitrescu; May 27, 1928 Olari, Prahova County, Kingdom of Romania
- Died: December 5, 2008 (aged 80) Bucharest, Romania
- Resting place: Olari, Romania
- Party: PNȚCD
- Occupation: Politician

Constantin-Grigore Dumitrescu, also known as Constantin Ticu Dumitrescu or Ticu Dumitrescu (27 May 1928 – 5 December 2008), was a Romanian politician and president of the Association of Romanian Former Political Prisoners. He was noted as a leading figure in the anti-communist resistance in Romania and for initiating the country's Uncovering the Securitate law.

== Background ==
Dumitrescu was born on May 27, 1928, in Ciumați (now Olarii Vechi), a village in Olari commune, Prahova County. He studied law at the University of Bucharest, but was arrested by the Communist authorities in 1949 due to his political activities. He then worked as a construction laborer after he was rejected by Romanian universities when he attempted to go back to school. Dumitrescu was incarcerated again in 1958 and was sentenced to 23-year forced labor on the charge of conspiring against the state. He went through many prisons, including those in Ploiești, Târgșor, Brașov, Jilava, Mărgineni, Galați, Botoșani, and Văcărești, and the forced labor camp at Poarta Albă, on the Danube–Black Sea Canal. He was freed in 1964.

Dumitrescu became a member of the Christian Democratic National Peasants' Party and was elected to the Senate of Romania from 1992 to 2000. During his tenure, he promoted laws that protect citizens against the persecutions of the Romanian secret police as well as the interests of political prisoners. For instance, he drafted the legislation that opened the files of the Securitate, which included documents that contain information on people spying on citizens.

Dumitrescu died December 5, 2008, in Bucharest due to liver cancer and was buried in Olari. A street in Arad has been named after him.
