= List of senior Securitate officers =

This is a list of senior Securitate officers. The General Direction for the Security of the People, better known by its Romanian abbreviation, Securitate, was officially founded on August 30, 1948 by Decree 221/30. However, it had effectively existed since August 1944, when communists began to infiltrate the Ministry of Internal Affairs on a large scale, with help from SMERSH, an NKVD unit charged with demolishing existing intelligence agencies and replacing them with Soviet-style bodies in the Soviet-occupied countries of Eastern Europe.

From its inception, the Securitate engaged in a terror campaign against "class enemies". The campaign was led from the position of Minister of Interior by Teohari Georgescu in 1948–1952, and Alexandru Drăghici in 1952–1965, seconded in the position of Deputy Interior Minister (until 1960) and Chief of Securitate by Gheorghe Pintilie. Although the largest number of victims was registered between 1948 and 1952, the campaign continued until 1965.

== Top leaders ==
- Teohari Georgescu
- Gheorghe Pintilie
- Alexandru Nicolschi
- Vladimir Mazuru
- Mișu Dulgheru
- Tudor Sepeanu
- Alexandru Drăghici
- Serghei Nicolau

== Leaders of the Securitate in 1948 ==
In 1948, the Securitate had a personnel of 3,973 of all ranks; of those, 1,151 belonged to the national directorates and 2,822 to the regional directorates.

=== Top leadership ===
- Director General: lieutenant general Gheorghe Pintilie
- Deputy Directors: major general Alexandru Nicolschi, major general Vladimir Mazuru
- Registrar Office:
  - Director: major Wilhelm Einhorn
  - Office Chiefs: captain Dumitru Donescu, captain Emanoil Schmerler
  - Section Chiefs: captain Nicolae Mateescu, captain Alexandru Jurcă
- Soviet Counselors: Dmitry Georgievich Fedichkin, Aleksandr Mikhailovich Sakharovsky, Valerian Bucikov, Moscalu, Tsygankov

=== National directorates ===
- First Directorate
  - Director: colonel Gavrilă Birtaș
  - Deputy Director: lieutenant colonel Andrei Glavaciov
  - Branch Chiefs: major Ionel Negreanu, captain Mauriciu Adam, captain Heinz Stănescu, captain Aurelian Ionescu
- Second Directorate
  - Director: colonel Gogu Popescu
  - Deputy Director: major Gheorghe Bulz
  - Branch Chiefs: captain Ilie Sariceleanu, major Maximilian Vardan, captain Mihai Andriescu
- Third Directorate
  - Director: major Coman Stoilescu
  - Branch Chiefs: captain Augustin Cosma, lieutenant Grigore Filipescu
- Fourth Directorate
  - Director: major Gheorghe Petrescu
  - Deputy Director: captain Cricor Garabețian
  - Branch Chiefs: captain Boris Caranicolov, captain Ilarion Savenco, captain Andrei Ciuperge, lieutenant Gheorghe Mihăilescu
- Fifth Directorate
  - Directors: colonel Mișu Dulgheru, colonel Mircea Lepădătescu
  - Deputy Director: lieutenant colonel Simion Tudor Dincă
  - Branch Chiefs: captain Matușei Andriescu, captain Grigore Ștețcovici
- Sixth Directorate
  - Director: lieutenant colonel Augustin Albon
  - Deputy Director: major Ion Crișan
  - Branch Chiefs: lieutenant Traian Predescu, captain Dionisie Dobre, lieutenant Andrei Tulbure
- Seventh Directorate
  - Director: lieutenant colonel Alexandru Neacșu
  - Branch Chief: major Cornel Goliumbovici
- Eighth Directorate
  - Deputy Director: major Dumitru Popescu
- Ninth Directorate
  - Deputy Directors: major Alexandru Guțan (Director of Aiud Prison, 1945–1948), major Nicolae Duță
  - Branch Chief: captain Milo Aritonovici
- Tenth Directorate
  - Director: colonel Alexandru Jurnu
  - Deputy Director: major Ion Ceslanschi
  - Branch Chief: captain Mihalache Bujor

=== Regional directorates ===
- Regional Directorate Bucharest
  - Director: lieut.-col. Tudor Sepeanu
  - Deputy Director: major Moise Senater
  - Branch Chiefs: major Avram Solomon, major Dumitru Maxim, captain Vasile Feneșan, major Ștefan Niculescu
  - Offices in: Oltenița, Brănești. Căciulați, Buftea, Domnești.
- Regional Directorate Brașov
  - Director: colonel Iosif Kalbușek
  - Deputy Director: major Adalbert Izsák
  - Offices in: Zărnești, Codlea, Feldioara.
  - County Branch Făgăraș:
    - Office in: Arpașu de Jos
  - County Branch Odorheiu Secuiesc:
    - Offices in: Cristuru Secuiesc, Ocland.
  - County Branch Trei Scaune:
    - Offices in: Târgu Secuiesc, Covasna, Baraolt.
  - County Branch Miercurea Ciuc:
    - Offices in: Gheorgheni, Tulgheș, Sânmartin, Lunca de Jos.
- Regional Directorate Cluj
  - Director: colonel Mihai Patriciu
  - Deputy Director: lieutenant colonel Gheorghe Cuteanu
  - Office in: Huedin.
  - County Branch Mureș:
    - Offices in: Reghin, Sovata, Toplița
  - County Branch Turda:
    - Chief: captain Mihail Kovács
    - Deputy Director: lieutenant Jacob Weigner
    - Offices in: Câmpeni, Războieni.
  - County Branch Năsăud:
    - Chief: major Viorel Gligor
    - Deputy Director: lieutenant Andrei Lote
    - Offices in: Romuli, Rodna.
  - County Branch Someș:
    - Chief: major Nicolae Briceag
    - Deputy Director: lieutenant Ioan Rusu
    - Office in: Gherla.
- Regional Directorate Constanța
  - Director: captain Nicolae Doicaru
  - Deputy Directors: lieutenant Năstase Repi, lieutenant Gheorghe Manolache
  - Offices in: Mangalia, Medgidia, Ostrov, Vasile Roaită, Negru Vodă, Cernavodă, Hârșova.
  - County Branch Ialomița:
    - Chief: captain Ion Iacob
    - Deputy Director: lieutenant Dumitru Miu
    - Offices in: Urziceni, Slobozia, Fetești.
  - County Branch Tulcea:
    - Chief: Nicolae Paul
    - Offices in: Sulina, Babadag, Isaccea, Măcin, Topolog.
- Regional Directorate Craiova
  - Director: major Eugen Vistig
  - Deputy Director: major Ion Vasilescu
  - Offices in: Filiași, Calafat, Băilești.
  - County Branch Vâlcea:
    - Chief: major Nicolae Filip
    - Offices in: Horezu, Călimănești, Drăgășani, Brezoi.
  - County Office Gorj:
    - Chief: captain Gheorghe Năbădan
    - Offices in: Bumbești, Novaci.
  - County Branch Mehedinți:
    - Chief: captain Ioan Georgescu
    - Offices in: Baia de Aramă, Strehaia.
  - County Office Romanați:
    - Chief: major Ilie Enescu
    - Offices in: Corabia, Balș.
- Regional Directorate Galați
  - Director: colonel Mauriciu Ștrul
  - Deputy Director: major Gheorghe Babu
  - Offices in: Berești, Foltești, Pechea.
  - County Branch Putna:
    - Offices in: Adjud, Odobești, Panciu, Mărășești, Vizantea, Năruja.
  - County Branch Brăila:
    - Chief: captain Dumitru Raceu
    - Deputy Director: lieutenant Matei Dănilă
    - Offices in: Nicolești-Jianu, Făurei, Ianca, Viziru.
  - County Branch Râmnicu Sărat:
    - Chief: major Nicolae Gabrielescu
    - Deputy Directors: lieutenant Alexandru Sichiklev, lieutenant Barel Orenstein
    - Offices in: Dumitrești, Găgești, Ciorăști, Boldu.
  - County Branch Tecuci:
    - Offices in: Ivești, Podu Turcului, Stănilești.
  - County Branch Tutova:
    - Offices in: Murgeni, Puiești, Ghidigeni.
- Regional Directorate Iași
  - Director: lieutenant Nicolae Pandelea
  - Deputy Director: major Aurel Ceia.
  - Offices in: Târgu Frumos, Bivolari.
  - County Branch Neamț:
    - Offices in: Buhuși, Târgu Neamț, Borca, Roman, Băcești.
  - County Branch Bacău:
    - Chief: captain Paul Zelțer
    - Offices in: Târgu Ocna, Comănești, Moinești.
  - County Branch Fălciu.
  - County Branch Vaslui.
- Regional Directorate Oradea
  - Director: lieutenant Ludovic Czeller
  - Branch chiefs: captain Toma Elekes, captain Tiberiu Grad, captain Nicolae Drențea, captain Ioan Retezan.
  - Offices in: Beiuș, Salonta, Episcopia Bihorului, Marghita.
  - County Branch Sălaj:
    - Offices in: Carei, Valea lui Mihai, Șimleu Silvaniei.
  - County Branch Satu Mare:
    - Chief: captain Ludovic Weisz
    - Office in: Baia Mare.
  - County Branch Maramureș:
    - Chief: captain Alexandru Mureșan
    - Office in: Valea Vișeului.
- Regional Directorate Pitești
  - Director: colonel Mihail Nedelcu
  - Deputy Director: major Ioan Marin
  - Offices in: Curtea de Argeș, Costești, Stoiceni.
  - County Branch Muscel:
    - Chief: major Mihail Chicoș
    - Offices in: Rucăr, Domnești, Topoloveni.
  - County Branch Olt:
    - Chief: captain Ioan Bordei
  - Offices in: Drăgănești, Potcoava, Spineni.
  - County Branch Dâmbovița:
    - Chief: captain Ștefan Mănoiu
    - Offices in: Pucioasa, Gura Ocniței, Găiești, Răcari, Titu.
- Regional Directorate Ploiești
  - Director: lieutenant colonel Constantin Câmpeanu
  - Deputy Director: major Racovschi Mănescu
  - Offices in: Câmpina, Moreni, Sinaia, Bușteni, Predeal, Slănic, Urlați, Văleni, Băicoi.
  - County Branch Buzău:
    - Chief: captain Mihail Holofcov
    - Offices in: Pătârlagele, Mizil, Pogoanele.
  - County Branch Vlașca:
    - Offices in: Vidra, Drăgănești, Pietroșani.
- Regional Directorate Sibiu
  - Director: lieutenant colonel Gheorghe Crăciun
  - Deputy Director: captain Lucian Moldor
  - Office in: Cisnădie.
  - County Branch Alba:
    - Chief: captain Iacob Popa
    - Offices in: Sebeș, Abrud, Aiud.
  - County Branch Hunedoara:
    - Offices in: Petroșani, Lupeni, Simeria, Cugir, Brad, Orăștie, Hațeg.
  - County Branch Târnava-Mică:
    - Chief: captain Iuliu Trapovescu
    - Offices in: Târnăveni, Dumbrăveni.
  - County Branch Târnava-Mare:
    - Chief: captain Ion Buzescu
    - Offices in: Copșa Mică, Mediaș.
- Regional Directorate Suceava
  - Director: lieutenant colonel Ioan Popic
  - Offices in: Solca, Dărmănești.
  - County Branch Baia:
    - Chief: major Iacob Fuchs
    - Offices in: Pașcani, Lespezi.
  - County Branch Botoșani:
    - Chief: captain Israil Ruckerstein
    - Offices in: Hârlău, Ștefănești.
  - County Branch Câmpulung Moldovenesc:
    - Chief: captain Dumitru Petru
    - Offices in: Vatra Dornei, Gura Humorului, Vama.
  - County Branch Dorohoi:
    - Chief: captain Nicolae Morărescu
    - Offices in: Mihăileni, Săveni, Darabani.
  - County Branch Rădăuți:
    - Chief: captain Carol Iludescu
    - Office in: Siret.
- Regional Directorate Timișoara
  - Director: lieutenant colonel Coloman Ambruș
  - Deputy Director: major Aurel Moiș
  - Offices in: Jimbolia, Lipova, Sânnicolau Mare, Deta, Recaș.
  - County Branch Arad:
    - Chief: major Alexandru Rafila
    - Offices in: Sebeș, Curtici, Chișineu-Criș.
  - County Branch Severin:
    - Chief: major Zoltán Kling
    - Offices in: Caransebeș, Făget, Orșova, Băile Herculane.
  - County Branch Caraș:
    - Chief: lieutenant Iosif Hahamu
    - Offices in: Reșița, Moldova Nouă, Anina.
