= Topana =

Topana may refer to:

- Topana, Olt, a commune in Olt County, Romania
- Topana (genus), a genus of bush crickets or katydids in the family Tettigoniidae, subfamily Phaneropterinae
- Topana Fortress, medieval fortress in Imotski, Croatia
