= Goldammer =

Goldammer is a surname. Notable people with the surname include:

- Bruno Goldammer (1904–1968 or 1969), German footballer
- Roger Goldammer (born 1969), Canadian motorcycle builder
- Johann Goldammer (born 1949), senior scientist at the Max Planck Society for Chemistry, Biogeochemistry Department

== See also ==
- Goldhammer
