= Gheorghe Flondor =

Romanian politician (1892–1976)

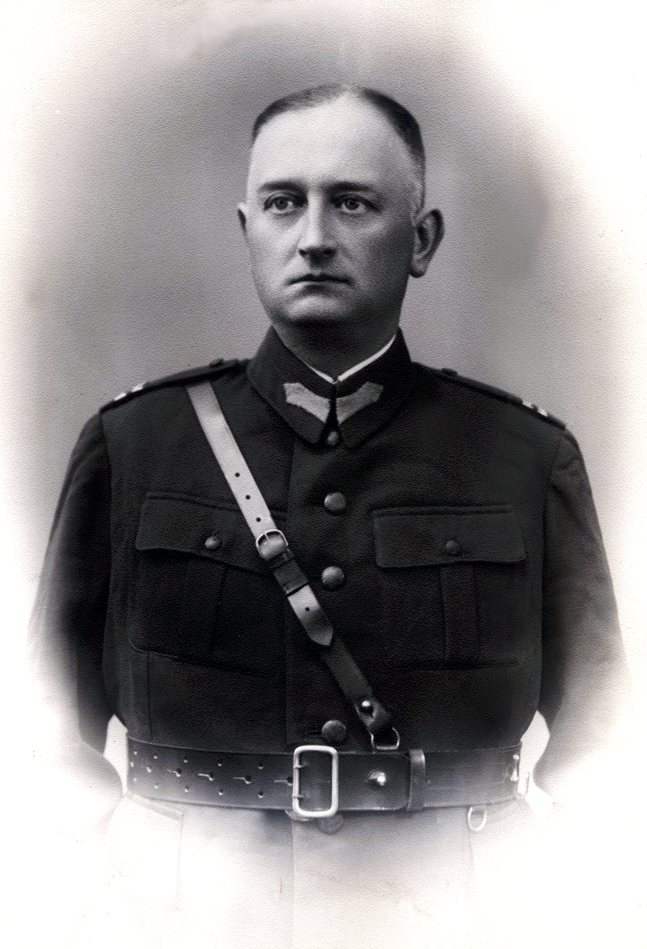
- Born: 31 August 1892; Roman, Kingdom of Romania
- Died: 26 April 1976 (aged 83); Bucharest, Socialist Republic of Romania
- Education: University of Vienna; Charles University
- Spouse: Lucia Stephanovici (m. 1927; div. 1945)
- Children: Tudorel Flondor (b. 1929)
- Military career
- Allegiance: Austria-Hungary
- Branch: Army
- Service years: 1914–1918
- Rank: Hauptmann
- Unit: 14th Dragoons Regiment (1914)
- Conflicts: World War I: Serbian Campaign; Russian Campaign; Romanian Campaign; Italian Campaign
- Awards: Medal for Bravery in Silver Class I and II; Military Merit Medal; Military Merit Cross Class II
- Other work: Royal Resident of Ținutul Suceava

Gheorghe Flondor (Georg Ritter von Flondor) (August 31, 1892, Roman – April 26, 1976, Bucharest) was a Romanian politician who served as Royal Resident (Rezident Regal) of Ținutul Suceava from February 7, 1939, to September 23, 1940.

== Political career ==
Flondor was born in Roman, Neamț County to Tudor Flondor (1862–1908) and his wife, Maria Ciuntu; his uncle was Iancu Flondor. In 1910 he graduated from State High School nr. 3 in Chernivtsi, part of Austria-Hungary at the time. That year he began courses at the University of Vienna's Law Faculty, where he studied for three years and took part of his licentiate. He underwent his last year of studies at Charles University in Prague.

After graduating university, he was mobilised into the Austro-Hungarian Army. He took part in battles on the Serbian Front in World War I, where his unit (14th Dragoons Regiment) suffered heavy losses. From 1915 to 1917 he fought on the Russian Front and advanced to the rank of Sub-Lieutenant. For his distinguished merits he was decorated with high military distinctions: "Silver Medal" Class I and II with Signum Laudis and "Cross of Merit" Class II. In the spring of 1917 he fought on the Romanian Front, where he was wounded, being cared for in the Baden military hospital. Once he recovered, he was sent to the Italian Front and promoted to the rank of Captain. Upon his request, he was relieved of his duties shortly before the end of hostilities, under the pretext of administrative family duties in Rogojești, which had been left to the exclusive handling of his mother.

In 1923, he entered politics, joining the National Liberal Party at the suggestion of Ion Nistor, a bitter political and open personal enemy of Flondor's uncle, Iancu. He was elected deputy for Rădăuți in the Parliament of Romania (1927–1935) and then senator for Rădăuți (1935–1937).

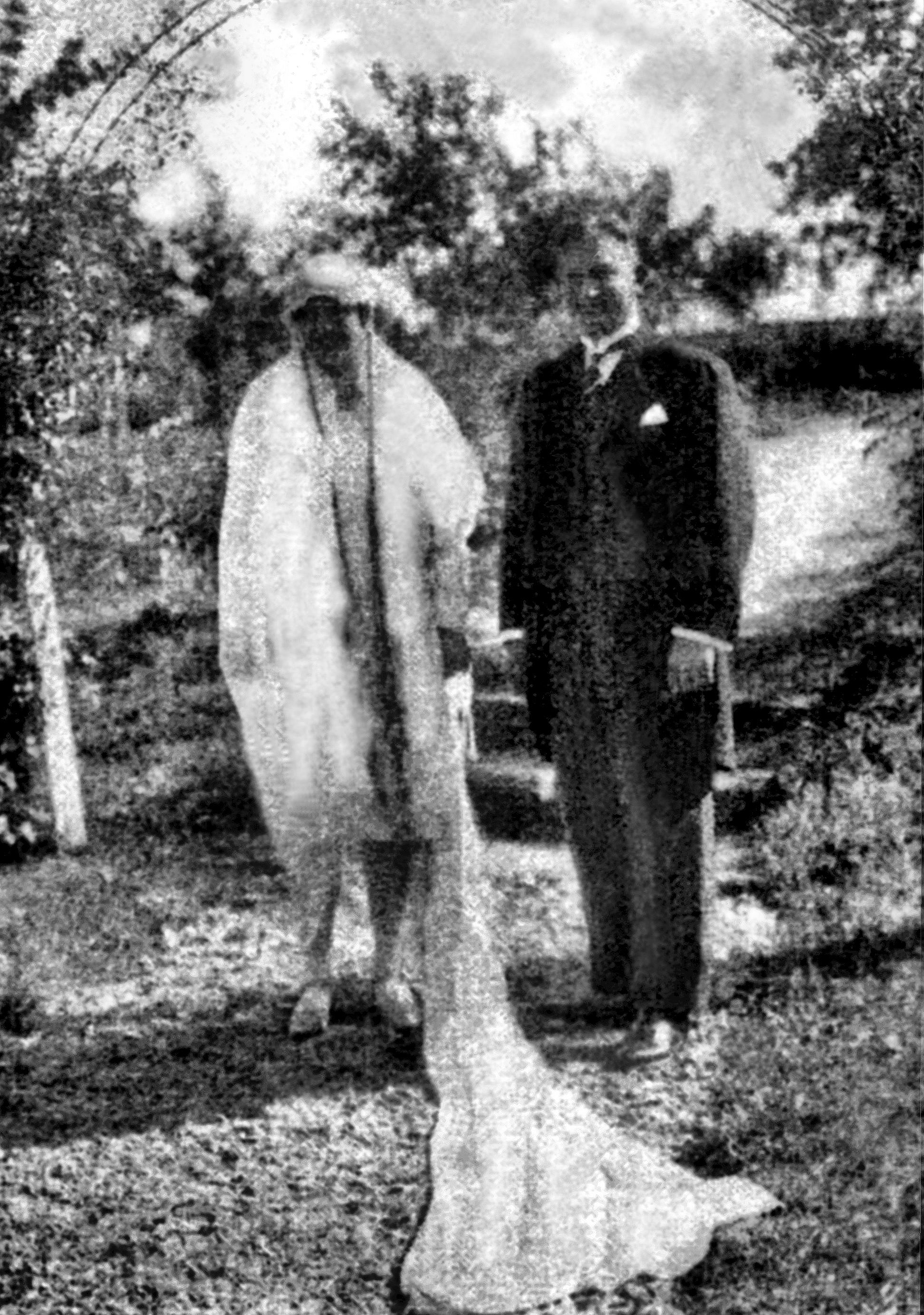
Marriage of Flondor and Lucia Stephanovici, 1927

In 1927, he married Lucia Stephanovici, later known under the pen name of Lotte Berg as a translator and author of children's books. They had a son, Tudorel (1929–1952), a scientist and national chess champion for 1951.

Flondor was also president of the Siret Bank and of the General Trade Union for Animal Export. In the latter capacity, he travelled, with a view toward cracking new markets, to Austria, Germany, Egypt, and Palestine. For two successive terms, he was also president of the Rădăuți Agricultural Chamber and director of the Cernăuți Northern Bank.

== Royal Resident and prosecution ==
After his election as a National Renaissance Front counsellor in 1939, that February he was named Royal Resident of Ținutul Suceava, with a residence at Cernăuți. His programme, presented upon his installation, foresaw:

- The raising of living standards for the peasantry, then suffering severe economic times.
- The maintenance of public order, in the context of two growing threats: the Iron Guard, and Bolshevist agitation coming from across the Soviet border.

After the Soviet ultimatum of June 1940, Bessarabia and Northern Bukovina were incorporated into the USSR. On June 28, 1940, twenty-two years after the Union of Bukovina with Romania championed by Iancu Flondor, another Flondor implemented the act of cession, completing his term in Vatra Dornei. During World War II, Gheorghe Flondor helped save the lives of 12 Jewish families.

After leaving Northern Bukovina, Flondor quit politics entirely and settled in Sibiu, where in 1945 he divorced his wife. Four years after the Romanian People's Republic was proclaimed, in 1952, he was arrested, being tried publicly in 1956 and sentenced by the Military Tribunal of Region II to 10 years' hard imprisonment. According to C. Al. Racovitză and Mihai Pânzaru, the regime went after him because he had been a Royal Resident.

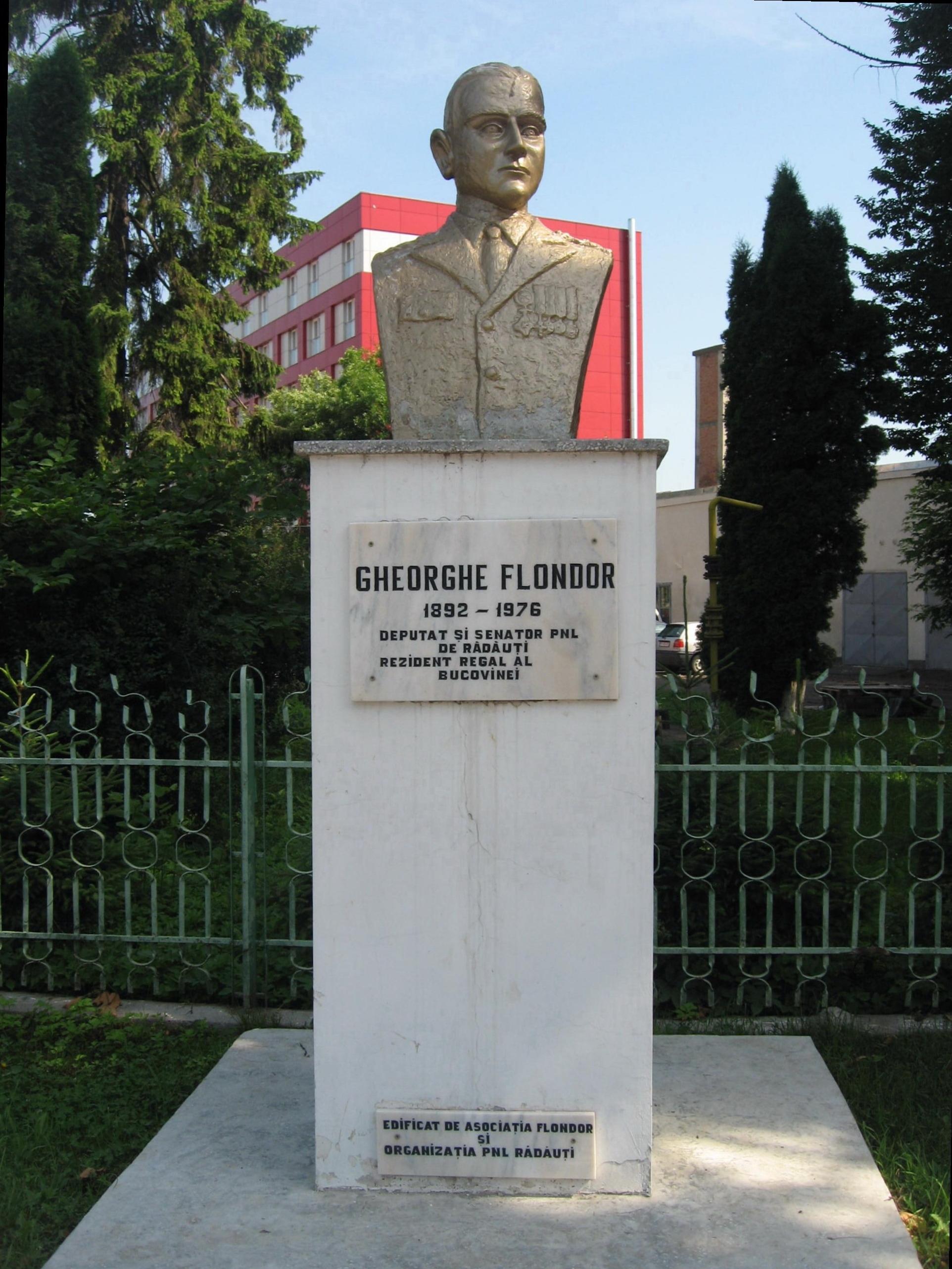
Bust of Flondor în Rădăuți

During the trial, twelve Romanian citizens of Jewish origin from Siret went to the State Notary of the former Siret Raion, Suceava Region, and signed a declaration affirming that "during the racial persecutions, [Flondor] had a fair, democratic and well-intentioned attitude toward the Jewish population, helping it at critical moments in relation to the racial persecution against the Jews by the fascist authorities". However, the tribunal did not take this declaration into account.

Flondor was detained at prisons in Văcărești (1952–1954), Suceava (1954–1956), Oradea (1956), Aiud (1956–1959), Galați, and Botoșani. He was freed in the general amnesty of 1964, already a sick old man. Having been deprived of all his property, he was also forbidden from taking up residence with his last living relatives, in Bucharest. He was assigned a forced residence in Lățești, where he lived in a hut until 1970, when he was allowed to live in Bucharest. He died in that city six years later.

A bust of Flondor, sculpted by Gavril Nichitean, was unveiled in Rădăuți in 2008.
