= Wedding in Bessarabia =

- Directed by: Napoleon Helmis
- Written by: Napoleon Helmis
- Produced by: Dan Rațiu; Donat Etienne; Virgiliu Mărgineanu
- Starring: Vlad Logigan; Victoria Bobu, Constantin Florescu; Igor Chistol; Viorica Geantă Chelbea; Horațiu Mălăele
- Music by: Anatol Ștefăneț
- Distributed by: Mediana Communication
- Release dates: December 2, 2009 (Tallinn Black Nights); September 23, 2010 (Romania)
- Running time: 92 minutes
- Countries: Romania; Moldova; Luxembourg
- Language: Romanian

Wedding in Bessarabia (Romanian: Nuntă în Basarabia) is a comedy made in 2009 by director Napoleon Helmis. It is a co-production between Romania, Moldova, and Luxembourg.

== Overview ==
The director of the film is Napoleon Helmis (born in 1969, Topana); he graduated from the National Theater and Film's Art University in Bucharest in 1996, where he currently teaches film direction.

Hoping to find an easier way to make a living, the train is taking them from the hard life of Romania to the girl's homeland of Moldova (Bessarabia), where the wedding will be held. The wedding not only reunited her with her family but also allows the couple the chance to receive presents and cash that they desperately need to start their new life together. In the midst of political debate, social complexities and economic hardships, what emerges is a portrait of a community that celebrates joie de vivre and humanity. The film holds on to its optimism while it delights artistically in the socio-political complexities of a region that has known its share of sorrows. Bessarabia was part of Romania from 1918 to 1940 and then was incorporated into the Soviet Union as the Moldavian SSR.

The film was presented during the 2010 Montreal World Film Festival, Focus on World Cinema.

== Awards ==
- Tallinn Black Nights Film Festival, December 2009
- Comedy Cluj Film Festival, Most Popular, October 2009

== See also ==
- Cinema of Romania
- Cinema of Moldova
