= Gheorghe-Gică Alexandrescu =

Romanian chess player

Personal information
- Born: 10 December 1906
- Died: after 1972

Chess career
- Country: Romania

Gheorghe-Gică Alexandrescu (10 December 1906 – after 1972) was a Romanian chess player, Romanian Chess Championship winner (1951).

== Biography ==
In 1951, Gheorghe-Gică Alexandrescu shared 1st place with Tudorel Flondor in individual Romanian Chess Championship in Bucharest. Both chess players were declared champions. He also played in the international chess tournaments in Bucharest (1949, 1951) and Timișoara (1972). As a member of the Romanian national team, Gheorghe-Gică Alexandrescu took part in the unofficial Chess Olympiad (played on board 1) and in an international match with the French national team (1955).
