= Goldhammer =

Goldhammer is a surname. Notable people with the surname include:

- Arthur Goldhammer (born 1946), American translator and academic
- Leo Goldhammer (1884–1949), Israeli journalist, lawyer, sociologist, and statistician
- Rio Goldhammer (born 1990), British musician
