= Cluj Prison =

Romanian prison

Cluj Prison was a prison located in Cluj, Romania.

Situated in the city center, the prison had three distinct sections: main, minors and courthouse. With 56 rooms of various sizes, it was located in the eastern part of the Palace of Justice, completed in 1902 under Austria-Hungary. Prior to the establishment of a Romanian Communist Party-led government in 1945, the prison housed common criminals such as thieves, forgers and vandals with sentences of up to one year. Prisoners who received longer sentences were then transferred to Aiud and Gherla Prisons. The prison held about 130-170 people at any given time, of whom ten to twelve accused communists. In 1940, after the Second Vienna Award temporarily awarded Northern Transylvania to Hungary, ethnic Romanian prisoners were sent to Romania, while Hungarian detainees remained there.

After 1945, prisoners were again held at Cluj in pre-trial custody and sent elsewhere once their cases were over. In 1945–1950, the prison population numbered 800–1000, of whom 500-600 were common criminals and the rest political prisoners. In 1950–1956, of 500-600 detainees, some 400 were common criminals. Subsequently, until the late 1960s, the total fell to 400, of whom 10-15 were political. There were some 200 minors in 1953, all common criminals. Between 1945 and 1948, thirty-one escapes were recorded. In 1950, the Securitate secret police executed at least thirteen members of the anti-communist resistance movement inside the prison. Nicolae Mărgineanu underwent violent interrogation just before being released in 1964, and beatings were especially common while prisoners were being escorted to and from court. It is credibly asserted by witnesses that during these walks, the Securitate shot tens of detainees, whose deaths were recorded as having occurred while attempting to flee or attacking guards.
