= Olari, Prahova =

Olari
- Commune
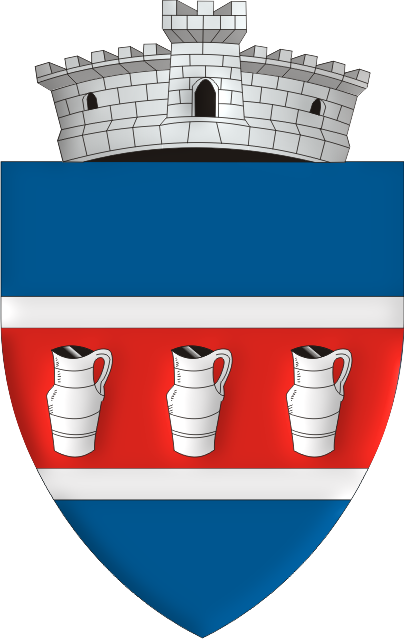
- Coat of arms

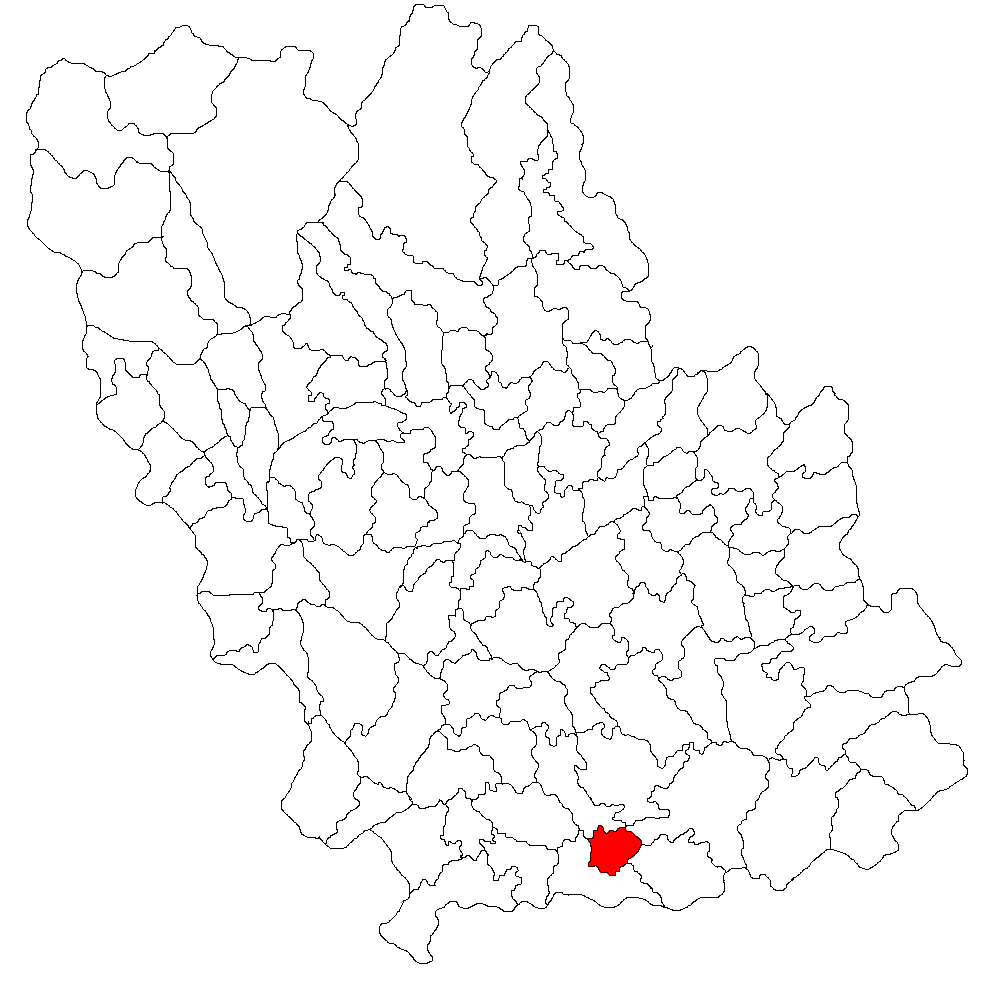
- Location in Prahova County

- Location in Romania
- Coordinates: 44°47′N 26°12′E
- Country: Romania
- County: Prahova

Government
  - Mayor (2024–2028): Milică Voinescu (PSD)
- Area: 18.04 km^{2} (6.97 sq mi)
- Elevation: 86 m (282 ft)
- Population (2021-12-01): 1,769
  - Density: 98/km^{2} (250/sq mi)
- Time zone: EET/EEST (UTC+2/+3)
- Postal code: 107269
- Area code: +(40) 244
- Vehicle reg.: PH
- Website: primariaolari.ro

Olari is a commune in Prahova County, Muntenia, Romania. It is composed of three villages: Fânari, Olari, and Olarii Vechi. Until 2004, these belonged to Gherghița Commune, when they were split off to form a separate commune.

Historical population
Year	Pop.	±%
2002	2,076	—
2011	2,146	+3.4%
2021	1,769	−17.6%
Source: Census data

At the 2011 census, the commune had 2,146 inhabitants, of which 98.42% identified as ethnic Romanians; 97.8% were Romanian Orthodox, 1.6% Adventist, and 0.4% Christian Evangelical. At the 2021 census, Olari had a population of 1,769, of which 91.29% were Romanians.

== Natives ==
- Constantin Ticu Dumitrescu (1928–2008), politician
