= Tudor Flondor =

Romanian composer and politician

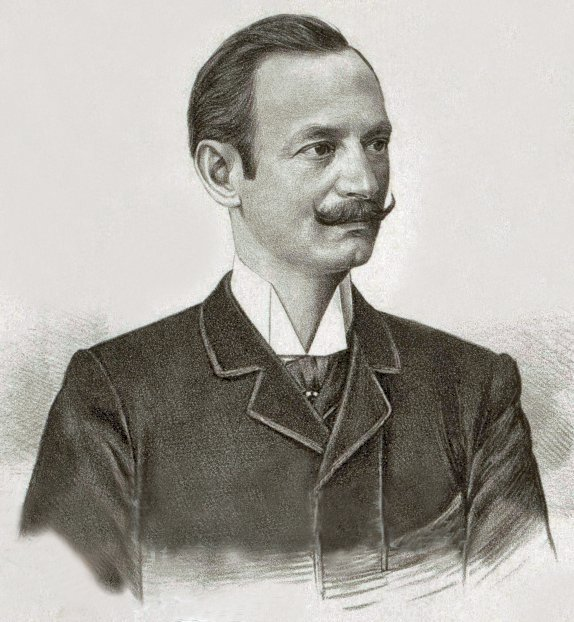
Image of Flondor

Tudor Flondor (July 10, 1862 – June 23, 1908) was an ethnic Romanian composer and politician in Austria-Hungary, in the Duchy of Bukovina.

Born into an Orthodox Christian family in Storojineț, his parents were Gheorghe Flondor and his wife Isabela (née Dobrovolschi de Buchenthal). He studied piano at home, then music at the Cernăuți philharmonic society (1879-1883), under Vojtěch Hřímalý. He continued his studies at the Vienna Music Academy (1884-1888). Meanwhile, he studied law at Czernowitz University (1882-1884). At his parents’ recommendation, he transferred to the Life Sciences University in Vienna (1884-1887), studying agriculture. From 1885 to 1889, he directed the choir and orchestra of România Jună Society in Vienna. From 1883 to 1906, he was conductor and composer at the Armonia musical society in Cernăuți, serving as its president from 1906 until his death.

Flondor became mayor of Rogojești in 1889, remaining until 1905 and gaining the trust of the villagers, who relied on him to solve their problems. While there, he lived in the family residence and worked on his farm. He was elected to the Diet of Bukovina in 1898, winning 63 of 66 votes as a moderate member of the Romanian National Party. He served until 1907 and in the Austrian House of Deputies from 1901 to 1907. From 1901 to 1908, following an appointment by Emperor Franz Joseph, he was head of the Bukovina Commission on Agriculture, his second great passion. He wrote a large number of compositions at his estate of Rogojești, where he spent most of his time; he inherited the property after his father's death in 1892. His output had a patriotic, national character, extending beyond the borders of Bukovina, helping to spur Romanian activism there. He died at Schlachtensee.

Flondor composed music for theatre: Rămășugul (text by Vasile Alecsandri), comedy, 1883; Nunta țărănească (text by Alecsandri), operetta, 1883; Lița Pescărița (libretto by N. A. Bogdan), operetta, 1883; Rusaliile (libretto by Alecsandri), operetta, 1884; Cinel-cinel, vaudeville with a libretto by Alecsandri, 1884; Drum de fier (1884); Florin și Florica (vaudeville, 1884); Noaptea Sfântului Gheorghe (operetta, 1885); Moș Ciocârlan (libretto by Constantin Berariu and Temistocle Bocancea), operetta, 1889. His piano music includes: Visuri (waltz, 1885); Saluts des Montagnes (waltz, 1886); Din depărtare (waltz, 1890); La violette (polka-mazurka, 1891); Florile Bucovinei (waltz, 1891). He wrote numerous pieces of choral music, including the masterpiece Somnoroase păsărele, and vocal music for voice and piano.

His brother was Iancu Flondor. In 1888, he married Maria Ciuntu, the daughter of a great landowning family from the Romanian Old Kingdom, originally from the Roman area. The couple had four children: diplomat Constantin, soprano Isabela-Nectaria, politician Gheorghe and composer Florica.
