= Idov Cohen =

Romanian-Israeli journalist and politician

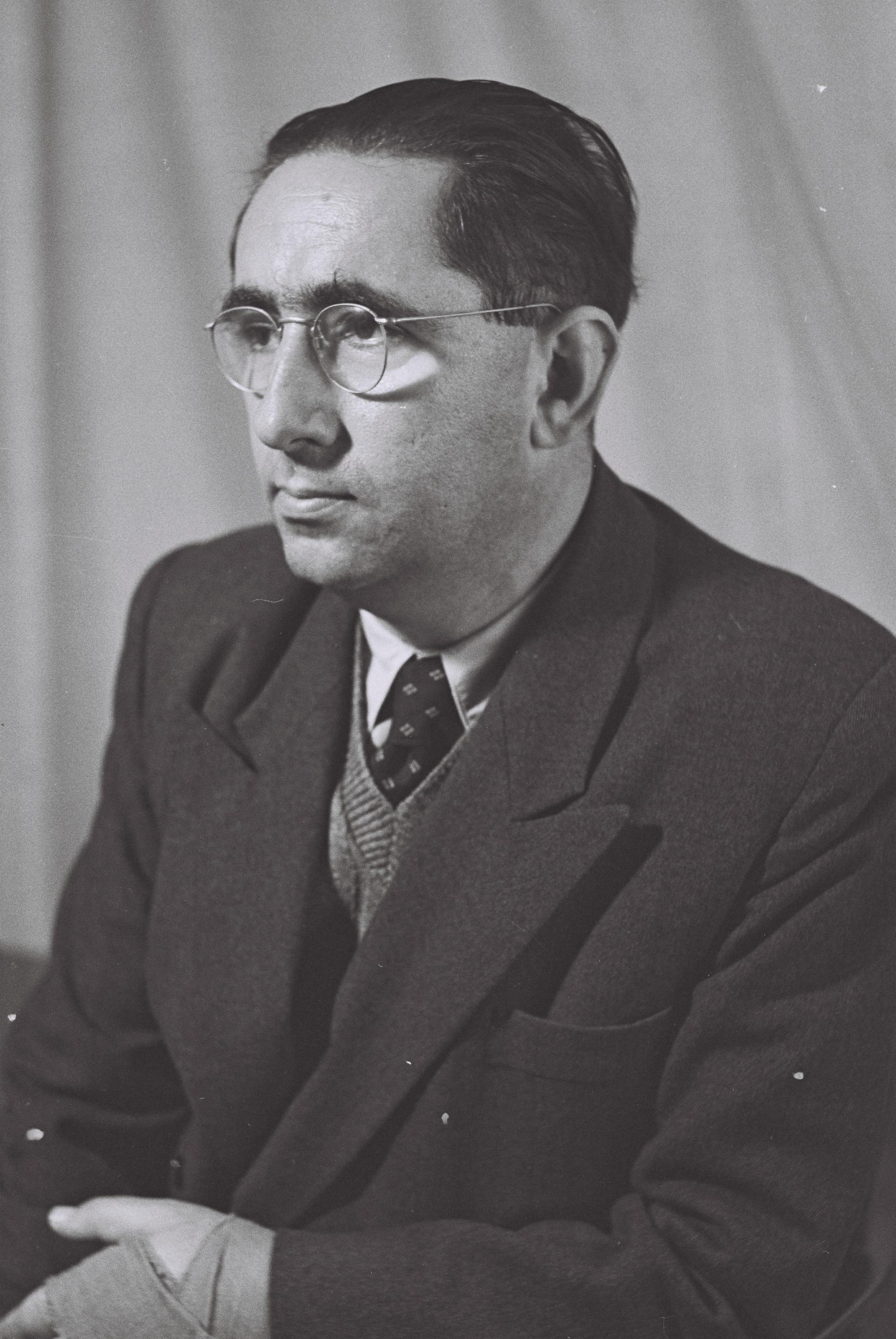
- Cohen in 1951

Faction represented in the Knesset
- 1949–1961: Progressive Party
- 1961–1963: Liberal Party

Personal details
- Born: 4 November 1909 Mihăileni, Romania
- Died: 16 May 1998 (aged 88)

Idov Cohen (Hebrew: אידוב כהן; 4 November 1909 – 16 May 1998) was a Romanian-Israeli politician and journalist. He served as a member of the Knesset for the Progressive Party and Liberal Party between 1949 and 1963.

== Biography ==
Born in Mihăileni, Botoșani County, Romania in 1909, Cohen was educated at a yeshiva. Between 1927 and 1933 he worked as a bookkeeper, before being appointed General Secretary of the Jewish National Fund in the country, a job he held until 1939. He also worked as a journalist, and was a member of the editorial board of Our Rebirth between 1933 and 1939, the editor of Romanian Zionist Weekly from 1933 until 1943, Illustrated Zionist Weekly (1933–1937), as well as publishing Adam, a monthly Jewish literary magazine (1937–1939).

In 1940 he emigrated to Mandatory Palestine, where he was amongst the founders of the Association of Romanian Immigrants, and started work as the chief editor of The Zionist Worker. In 1943, he became deputy editor of HaZman and editor of Carenno, working for both until 1947. In 1948, he founded the Organisation for Romanian Immigrants.

A founding member of the Progressive Party, he served on Tel Aviv city council, and was elected to the Knesset on the party's list in 1949. He lost his seat in the July 1951 elections, but returned to the Knesset on 10 September as a replacement for Moshe Kol. He was re-elected in 1955 and 1959. In 1961, he initiated the move to unite the Progressive Party with the General Zionists to form the Liberal Party. He was re-elected on the new party's list in elections later that year, but resigned from the Knesset on 11 November 1963, and was replaced by Aharon Goldstein.

He died on 16 May 1998.
