= Nicolae Carandino =

Romanian journalist, translator, and politician (1905–1996)

Nicolae Carandino (19 July 1905 – 16 February 1996) was a Romanian journalist, pamphleteer, translator, dramatist, and politician.

He was born in Brăila into a family of intellectuals, the son of a Romanian mother and Greek father. After completing high school in Brăila in 1923, he went to study at the University of Bucharest, graduating in 1926. He then pursued his graduate studies in Paris for three years, during which time he married Lilly Carandino. Upon his return to Romania, he was editor in chief of Facla (a left-wing publication run by N. D. Cocea), and a collaborator or editor at various other publications, including Credința, Reporter, Azi, and Floarea de Foc. Between 1938 and 1944, he served as Vice-President of the Journalists' Union.

During World War II, soon after the Legionnaires' Rebellion, Carandino became director of the National Theatre Bucharest, replacing Haig Acterian (who had been arrested for his Iron Guard membership). Because of his opposition to the authoritarian regime of Ion Antonescu, he was imprisoned in 1942 in a penitentiary camp near Târgu Jiu.

A member of the National Peasants' Party, he was, from 1944 to 1947, the editor of its newspaper, Dreptatea. During the period, he was also appointed by his political grouping to the board of the new Journalists' Union, and became a member of a committee charged with purging supporters of former far right regimes from the press (the committee was dominated by Romanian Communist Party members, and presided over by Emanoil Socor).

Carandino was one of the four politicians who were part of the National Peasants' Party leadership designated by party leader Iuliu Maniu to leave the country and create a credible and competent nucleus of Romanian anti-Communist resistance in the West, a move which resulted in the Tămădău Affair and their arrest on the morning of July 14, 1947. Of the defendants tried alongside Maniu, he was the last survivor. After this trial, he was sentenced to six years' hard labour and two years' loss of civil rights, his property was confiscated and he had to pay 1,000 lei in court fees. He was incarcerated at Galați Prison and at the notorious Sighet Prison, and then sent under forced domicile in the Bărăgan Plain, in the villages Bumbăcari and Rubla, being freed only in 1964.

After the Romanian Revolution against the communist regime, when Dreptatea resumed publication in 1990, he became its honorary director. That year, he was also made honorary member of the revived National Peasants' Party.

Carandino, who was a gifted columnist, relates an interesting anecdote in his memoirs: a young man reproached Carandino for not helping him; he replied: "I can help someone, but I can't replace him." He added, "I'm an old man now; going down the road of life I can see the end. When I turn back and look, I wonder why, if my own future is brief, others aren't coming up the road? Where are those who ought to be coming?"

He died at Hospital nr. 10 "Sf. Sava" in Bucharest. After a service at Boteanu Church, he was buried in Străulești Cemetery on February 21, 1996.

== Writings ==
- Carandino, Nicolae (1979). De la o zi la alta: memorii (in Romanian). București: Cartea Românească. OCLC 6089484.
- Carandino, Nicolae (2017). Nopți albe și zile negre: memorii din închisorile și lagărele comuniste (in Romanian). Paul Lăzărescu, Andrea Dobeș. București: Fundația Academia Civică. ISBN 978-606-8924-03-8. OCLC 1048358057.
