= Florica Racovitză-Flondor =

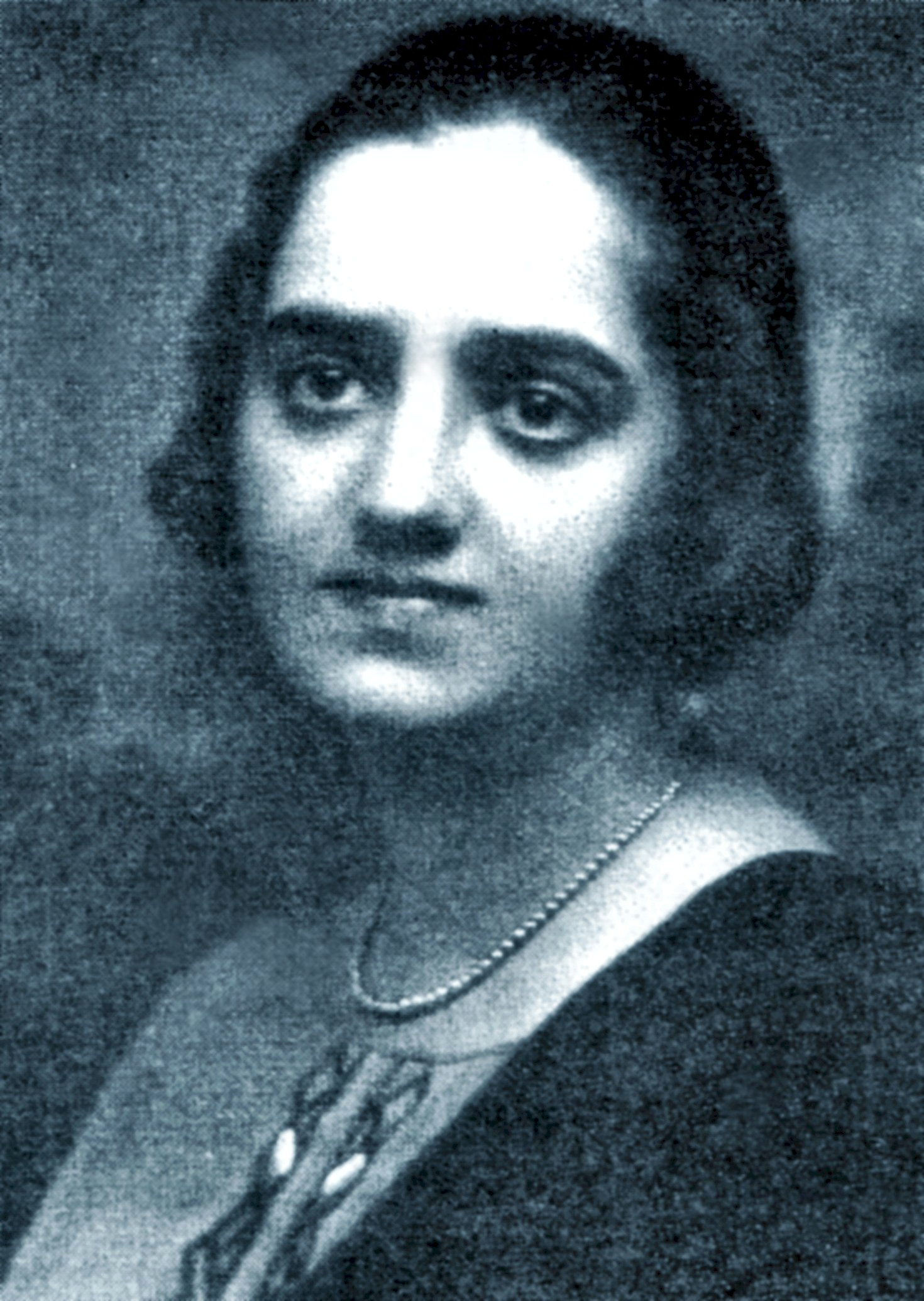
Racovitză-Flondor around 1930

Florica Racovitză-Flondor (also Racoviță; 13 November 1897 - 7 February 1983) was a Romanian composer and pianist who composed vocal and instrumental works, including at least five operettas. Some of her works were inspired by Romanian folklore.

Racovitză-Flondor was born in Rogojești, in Austria-Hungary’s Duchy of Bukovina. to Maria Ciuntu and Tudor Flondor. Her father was a politician, composer and conductor. She married Brigadier General Aurel Racovitză in 1924 and they had two children.

From 1916 to 1924, Racovitză-Flondor studied at the University of Music and Performing Arts Vienna. Later, she studied composition in Bucharest. Her teachers included Mihail Jora, Eusebius Mandyczewski, Joseph Marx, Emil Sauer, and Richard Stöhr.

Racovitză-Flondor belonged to the American Society of Composer, Authors, and Publishers (ASCAP). Her compositions were published by Editions Musicales and included:

== Operettas ==
- Lita the Fish Eater
- Santa Claus
- Peasant Wedding (libretto by Vasile Alecsandri)
- Pentecost
- Remnant

== Organ ==
- Chorale
- Prelude

== Piano ==
- Burlesque
- Caprice
- Dance
- From Children’s Life (Suite)
- Fugues in f minor and G Major
- Improvisation
- Noveletta
- Prelude and Fugue in c minor
- Sonata in f minor
- Song Without Words
- Source in the Woods
- Three Intermezzi
- Three Preludes
- Three Romanian Dances
- Three Studies
- Toccata
- Variations on a Romanian Theme

== Vocal ==
- Thirty Christmas Carols (harmonized for male voices)
