= Tudorel Flondor =

Romanian chess player

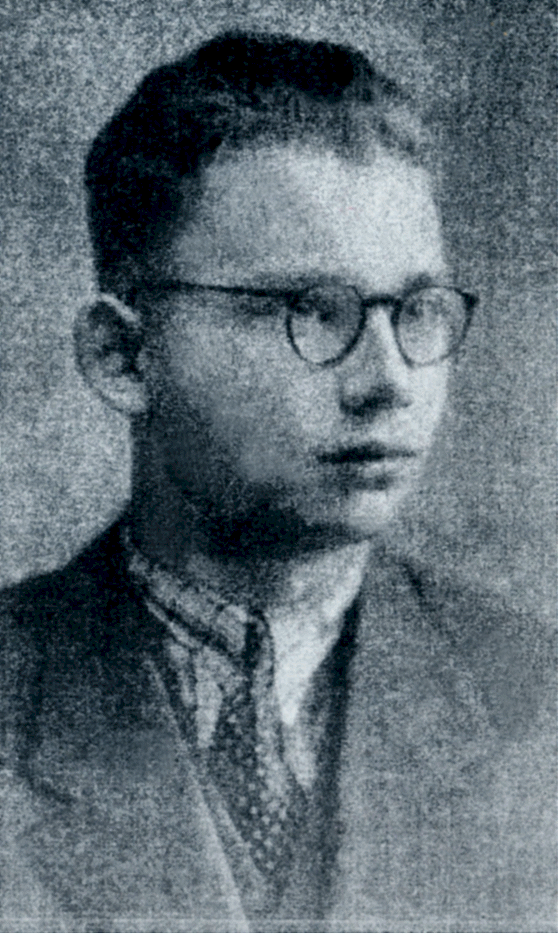

Personal information
- Born: 11 June 1929
- Died: 12 December 1952 (aged 23)

Chess career
- Country: Romania

Tudorel Flondor (11 June 1929 – 12 December 1952) was a Romanian chess player, Romanian Chess Championship winner (1951).

== Biography ==
Tudorel Flondor was the son of a politician Gheorghe Flondor (1892–1976). In 1951, Tudorel Flondor shared 1st place with Gheorghe-Gică Alexandrescu in individual Romanian Chess Championship in Bucharest. Both chess players were declared champions. He also played in the international chess tournament in Bucharest (1949). Tudorel Flondor was engaged in science. Died as a result of an accident: he came under high voltage.
