= Suceava Prison =

Prison in Suceava, Romania

Suceava Prison was a prison located in Suceava, Romania.

The prison dates to 1880, during the Austro-Hungarian period, and occupied the same building as the courthouse. A chapel was once located in the middle of the prison. Prisoners took part in services, and in 1941-1944 were joined by Iron Guard detainees, many of whom were priests. From 1944 to 1948, priests from outside the prison were brought in to officiate. In 1948, the new communist regime closed the chapel. The room was used as storage space for prisoners until 1955, thereafter for guards. Until 1941, prisoners were housed on the ground and two upper floors. That year, isolation cells were opened in the basement; these were sealed in 1945. Until 1944, the prison held common criminals, Iron Guardists and, on the second floor, sympathizers of the banned Romanian Communist Party.

Beginning in 1945, the common criminals held at Suceava were those considered dangerous, such as murderers. The building's architecture made escape nearly impossible. The prison, located on the edge of the city, acquired an ashen color, and its inmates referred to it as a grave without a cross. Political prisoners came from the Iron Guard. The secret police, known as the Securitate from 1948, had its arrest rooms in the same building, meaning it had ready access to the detainees, whom it would often subject to violent interrogations. Detainees held in the Securitate cells were often left there for months without being questioned. One woman had her tympanum burst during a beating, followed by two months of hemorrhage; while her sister went into a spontaneous abortion and severe internal bleeding. The facility was closed on January 1, 1958, its inmates sent to Botoșani Prison.

It was at Suceava that the “re-education” experiment began, later exported to places like Pitești and Gherla. The idea appears to have originated in mid-1948 with the civil-servant father of Alexandru Bogdanovici, one of numerous Iron Guardists from Western Moldavia sent to Suceava that year. The suggestion, drawing on a 1945 amnesty of Iron Guard members who pledged to cease anti-regime activities, was that initiating a re-education process might lead to a pardon. The authorities seemed receptive, and re-education began in late 1948. Eugen Țurcanu replaced Bogdanovici as lead re-educator in February 1949. In April, some 80 initiates were transferred to Pitești to continue. At Suceava, the short-lived experiment was rather mild, attempting to persuade prisoners of the virtues of internationalism. Many of these rebuffed the teams’ efforts. Around 1949–1952, the region saw activity both against collectivization and by the anti-communist resistance movement; mass arrests, torture and executions followed inside the prison.
