= Galați Prison =

Prison in Galați, Romania

- Interactive map of Galați Prison
- Location: Galați], Romania; 45.4547°N 28.0427°E
- Status: Operational
- Population: 594 (December 2023)
- Opened: 1897
- Managed by: Administrația Națională a Penitenciarelor
- Director: Mitică Andrei
- Website: anp.gov.ro/penitenciarul-galati/

Galați Prison (Romanian: Penitenciarul Galați) is a prison located in Galați, Romania.

The prison was built in the northern part of the city between 1893 and 1897, with a view to alleviating overcrowding in the area's detention facilities. Architecturally identical to the contemporaneous Craiova Prison, it featured a ground floor and two upper stories. With 30 cells each, the maximum capacity was considered to be 350 inmates. It housed common criminals until 1938, although starting in 1933, it was a transit prison for affiliates of the banned Romanian Communist Party, including Gheorghe Gheorghiu-Dej, Gheorghe Apostol, and Emil Bodnăraș. It was a military prison in 1938–1939, with a number of prominent Iron Guard members being sent there. World War II deserters were held at Galați from 1941.

From 1945, when a communist-dominated government came to power, until 1964, both common criminals and political prisoners were held at Galați. The latter were National Peasants' Party (PNȚ) and National Liberal Party members, former policemen and secret agents, war criminals, Iron Guard sympathizers, and priests from the surrounding region. They exceeded the common criminals in number between 1949 and 1954, and again in 1959–1960. By 1960, there were 1,800 prisoners, of whom 1,100 were political.

In 1947, Iuliu Maniu, Ion Mihalache, Nicolae Carandino, Ilie Lazăr, and other Peasantist leaders were sent to Galați and held in cells with the windows bolted shut, in order to prevent communication with outsiders. Lazăr frequently protested against the conditions, which led him to spend much time in solitary confinement. In 1951, following an escape attempt, the PNȚ group was transferred to Sighet Prison. Former anti-communist policemen arrived in 1955, and in 1957, incarcerated opposition party leaders were sent there following the Hungarian Revolution of 1956, in order to be further from the border. The notorious Nicolae Moromete became warden in 1952, imposing a reign of terror that included extreme cold, starvation, and forced labor of old and sick prisoners. During his first ten months, 48 prisoners died, prompting an investigation. His predecessor, Nicolae Goiciu (1949–1952), took pleasure in constantly beating prisoners with his fists. Former inmates include Nicolae Carandino, Constantin Ticu Dumitrescu, Gheorghe Flondor, Ernest Maftei, and Victor Rădulescu-Pogoneanu.

== Current use ==
The current director of the penitentiary is Mitică Andrei. As of December 2023, there are 594 detainees at Galați.
