= Leo Goldhammer =

Israeli politician

Leo Arieh Goldhammer (Zehawi) (Hebrew: לאו גולדהמר; 18 March 1884 – 18 July 1949) was an Austrian and Israeli journalist, lawyer, sociologist, statistician, and Zionist leader.

== Personal life ==
Born in Mihăileni, Romania, the son of the industrialist Isaac and Sohpie Goldhammer, he grew up in Chernivtsi and in 1904 moved to Vienna in Austria. He married Sidonie in 1914, having one son, Alfred (Emanuel), and two grandchildren, Ruth Goldhammer (Eldar) and Ehud Goldhammer. In 1939 he made aliyah to Mandate Palestine, and died in Haifa in 1949 after having suffered from a brain tumor.

== Studies ==
Following accomplishment of his studies in the Czernowitz Staatsgymnasium, he studied law and Political Science in the Vienna University, Austria, and then economics in the Export Akademie of Vienna. He was also a student of Georg Simmel in Berlin (sociology) and Franz Oppenheimer in Frankfurt (national economics).

== Career ==
Along with his work as a lawyer, Goldhammer was actively involved in Zionist activity, social, and cultural life of the large Jewish community of Vienna. He published many articles, manuscripts, works, and books, most of them in German, and several socio-economic research pieces on Chernivtsi's and Vienna's Jewish populations. Between 1933 and 1937 he was the editor and the publisher of the journal "Das Werdende Palestina", and wrote several articles in Die Stimme – Judische Zeitung. Together with some Zionist activists in 1914 he founded the Theodor Herzl academic society, which published Zionist issues, Israeli, and Jewish literature. In 1921 he became a member of the presidency of the Austrian branch of the Jewish National Fund, and served as its chairman between 1937 and 1938, and was also involved with Keren Hayesod. In 1925 he was elected to national board of Jewish Agency for Israel in Austria, and chaired it between 1926 and 1930. He represented the Jewish Zionist Community of Austria in the fifteenth to twenty-first Zionist Congresses.

Goldhammer was also the President of the Jewish Community in Vienna, Chairman of the Jewish National Library (Volksbibliothek), and the President of the "Working Palestine in Austria" league. He was also actively involved in the Jewish sport club Hakoah Vienna being the head of its swimming section.

After the Nazis gained control of Austria, Goldhammer became involved in Youth Aliyah, which encouraged immigration to Palestine. After 1938, most of his social and political activities took place in Israel, being one of the founders of the New Aliyah Party, and becoming a member of the Assembly of Representatives. He settled in Haifa and was head of the inhabitants registry department in the Ministry of Internal Affairs until 1949.
