= Topana, Olt =

Topana
- Commune
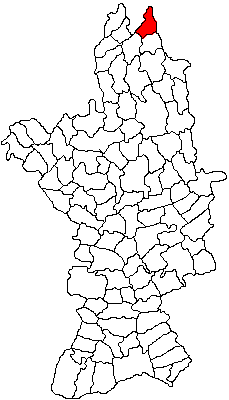
- Location in Olt County

- Location in Romania
- Coordinates: 44°49′N 24°31′E
- Country: Romania
- County: Olt
- Area: 34.62 km^{2} (13.37 sq mi)
- Population (2021-12-01): 755
  - Density: 21.8/km^{2} (56.5/sq mi)
- Time zone: UTC+02:00 (EET)
  - Summer (DST): UTC+03:00 (EEST)
- Vehicle reg.: OT

Topana is a commune in Olt County, Muntenia, Romania. It is composed of five villages: Cândelești, Ciorâca, Cojgărei, Topana and Ungureni.

== Natives ==
- Nicolae Moromete (1912–?), communist activist, prison warden, and torturer
