= Mișu Dulgheru =

Mișu Dulgheru (born Mihai Dulberger; January 16, 1909 – April 11, 2002) was a Romanian communist activist and spy. A clerk by trade, he rose through the secret police as the Romanian Communist Party consolidated its hold on power between 1944 and 1947, while from 1948 through 1952, he played an important role as an officer in the new Securitate. Subsequently, arrested as part of a wider purge, he was released after an investigation lasting over two years, but never regained his earlier prestige. Late in life, he left his native country for Israel and, later, Canada.

== Biography ==
=== Beginnings and detention ===
Born into a Jewish family in Tecuci, his parents were Olga and Sache, a small businessman. He completed three grades of secondary school and two of commercial school, becoming a clerk and an accountant. His first job was in 1927 with the Galați branch of Banque Belge pour l'Étranger. His uncle, a grain wholesaler, then hired him as an accountant. In 1932, he was drafted into the Romanian Army and assigned to a Galați cavalry regiment. Moving to the national capital Bucharest, he first worked at a store owned by his cousin, in 1938 starting work at the warehouse of a silk factory. That year, he married the accountant Liza Marcusohn. Also in 1938, he was fired from the factory as a result of anti-Semitic legislation passed by the Goga–Cuza government. He managed to buy a supply of defective towels from the factory, and the couple lived off their sale until the end of the year.

In early 1939, borrowing from wealthy relatives, they bought two sewing machines and one for stitching buttonholes. Inside their residence, they opened a small workshop for producing men's clothing. In January 1940, Liza was hired as a typist at the Soviet commercial office in Bucharest, with Mișu, upon her recommendation, soon following as an accountant. The couple were arrested in June 1941, at the start of Operation Barbarossa, and interned at the Târgu Jiu camp. There, they quickly fell into the communist circle.

=== Secret police years ===
While at Târgu Jiu, Dulgheru became a protégé of Soviet agent Vania Didenko (alias Ion Vidrașcu), who belonged to a group of about forty NKVD operatives that had been sent to Romania in the interwar period and had been caught. He joined the Romanian Communist Party (PCR) in August 1944, after it became legal as a result of the Royal coup d'état against the country's pro-Axis dictator, Ion Antonescu. The same year, Dulgheru joined a communist paramilitary organization, the auxiliary bureau of patriotic fighting forces. There, he was responsible for identifying opponents of the PCR, in particular members of the Iron Guard who were still free.

In April 1945, he entered the Siguranța secret police within the Interior Ministry (MAI) and was assigned to the detectives' corps. It was at this point that he changed his name. In 1947, he was named to the committee for repatriations from Germany. From 1948, after the establishment of a Communist regime, until 1952, he headed the MAI's penal investigation unit, and had the rank of colonel. Within this post, he coordinated all the activities of Securitate investigators within Romania. In essence, in the view of historian Marius Oprea, he supervised the entire series of tortures and abuses that took place in its investigation chambers during the secret police's first four years. Moreover, together with Alexandru Nicolschi, he undertook the deportation of tens of thousands of individuals into labor camps, During that time, Dulgheru was one of the Securitate officers who supervised the re-education of hundreds of minors at Târgșor Prison. Unlike his more brutish colleagues, he was cultivated, attractive and well-dressed, perceived as spontaneous and elegant, rarely resorting to physical abuse during interrogations. His office was handsomely furnished, as recalled by Lena Constante, who was interrogated there.

=== Downfall and later life ===
Dulgheru was, at the same time, an NKVD agent, and he held high-level positions within the new Securitate secret police from its beginnings. He helped coordinate the trial against those involved in the Danube–Black Sea Canal project's failure and helped investigate Lucrețiu Pătrășcanu. He also investigated a group of financiers tried in 1948, and the Protestant pastor Richard Wurmbrand. After the fall of the Pauker–Luca–Georgescu group, which marked the triumph of Gheorghe Gheorghiu-Dej in his power struggle with that faction, Dulgheru was arrested in October 1952. In particular, the arrest of Georgescu, the former Interior Minister, led to a witch-hunt within the Securitate. Dulgheru was a perfect victim: an intellectual who had good relations with the purged officials, as well as a Jew, which facilitated charges of Zionism. He was accused of having protected Emil Calmanovici (a businessman known for the financial support he had given to the Communist Party), and he was charged with sabotaging the prosecution of arrested Zionists.

Dulgheru was under investigation for two years and three months. While detained, he was allowed plenty of food, clean clothes and medicines, and was not tortured. Freed in January 1954 when the charge of deviationism could not be proved, he was reduced to the rank of a common soldier. In 1968, at which point he was supervisor of the Bucharest sanitation workers, the Stoica–Patilineț committee investigated abuses he had committed, but he was not punished. He emigrated to Israel with his family in the early 1980s, and was still alive a decade later; he died in Toronto in 2002, at age 93. In 2009, the High Court of Cassation and Justice ruled that military prosecutors should open proceedings against Dulgheru for his involvement in the 1948 death under torture of Alcibiades Diamandi; investigators began probing the case in 2013.
