= Securitate =

Secret police and Intelligence Agency of Communist Romania

Department of State Security
- Departamentul Securității Statului
- Coat of arms of Romania (1965–1989)

Agency overview
- Formed: 30 August 1948 (as the DGSP)
- Preceding agencies: Siguranța; SMERSH of Romania; Mobile Brigade
- Dissolved: 30 December 1989
- Superseding agencies: Romanian Intelligence Service; Foreign Intelligence Service; Protection and Guard Service; Special Telecommunication Service
- Type: Secret police Intelligence agency
- Jurisdiction: Romania
- Headquarters: Bucharest
- Employees: 15,312 Securitate employees (1989); 23,370 Security Troops (1989); c. 400,000 informants (1989)
- Agency executives: Gheorghe Pintilie, director, (1948–1959, first); Iulian Vlad, head, (1987–1989, last)
- Parent agency: Ministry of Interior (1948–1951, 1955–1989); Ministry of State Security (1951–1955)
- Child agency: See list

The Department of State Security (Romanian: Departamentul Securității Statului), commonly known as the Securitate (pronounced [sekuriˈtate], lit. 'Security'), was the secret police agency of the Socialist Republic of Romania. It was founded on 30 August 1948 from the Siguranța with help and direction from the Soviet MGB.

The Securitate was, in proportion to Romania's population, one of the largest secret police forces in the Eastern bloc. The first budget of the Securitate in 1948 stipulated a number of 4,641 positions, of which 3,549 were filled by February 1949: 64% were workers, 4% peasants, 28% clerks, 2% persons of unspecified origin, and 2% intellectuals. By 1951, the Securitate's staff had increased fivefold, while in January 1956, the Securitate had 25,468 employees. At its height, the Securitate employed some 15,000 agents and almost half a million informants for a country with a population of 23 million by 1989. Following the Romanian Revolution in 1989, the new authorities assigned the various intelligence tasks of the Securitate to new institutions.

== History ==
=== Founding ===
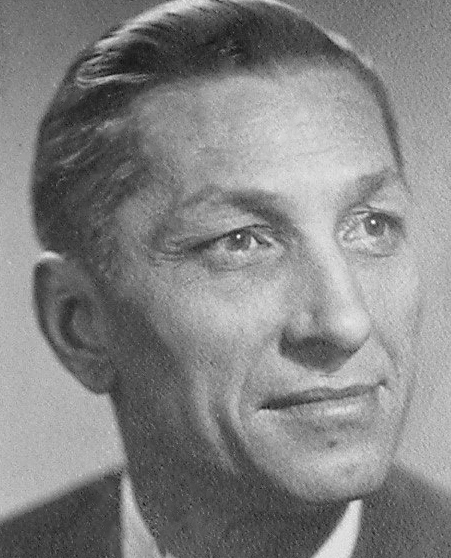
Gheorghe Pintilie, the first Director General of the Securitate

The General Directorate for the Security of the People (Romanian initials: DGSP, but more commonly just called the Securitate) was officially founded on 30 August 1948, by Decree 221/30 of the Presidium of the Great National Assembly. However, it had precursors going back to August 1944, following the coup d'état of 23 August. Its stated purpose was to "defend democratic conquests and guarantee the safety of the Romanian People's Republic against both internal and external enemies."

The Securitate was created with the help of SMERSH, the NKVD counter-intelligence unit. The SMERSH operation in Romania, called Brigada Mobilă (the "Mobile Brigade"), was led until 1948 by NKVD colonel Alexandru Nicolschi. The first Director of the Securitate was NKVD general Gheorghe Pintilie (born Panteleymon Bodnarenko, nicknamed "Pantiușa"). Alexandru Nicolschi (by then a general) and another Soviet officer, Major General Vladimir Mazuru, held the deputy directorships. Wilhelm Einhorn was the first Securitate secretary.

As Vladimir Tismăneanu says, "If one does not grasp the role of political thugs such as the Soviet spies Pintilie Bodnarenko (Pantiușa) and Alexandru Nikolski in the exercise of terror in Romania during the most horrible Stalinist period, and their personal connections with Gheorghe Gheorghiu-Dej and members of his entourage, it is difficult to understand the origins and the role of the Securitate".

Initially, many of the agents of the Securitate were former Royal Security Police (named General Directorate of Safety Police—Direcția Generală a Poliției de Siguranță in Romanian) members. However, before long, Pantiușa ordered anyone who had served the monarchy's police in any capacity arrested, and in the places of the Royal Security Policemen, he hired ardent members of the Romanian Communist Party (PCR), to ensure total loyalty within the organization.

Several Securitate operatives were killed in action, especially in the early 1950s. As listed by the internal news bulletin on the occasion of Securitate's twentieth anniversary, in 1968, these included major Constantin Vieru, senior lieutenant Ștefan Vămanu, lieutenant Iosif Sipoș, sub-lieutenant Vasile Costan, platoon leader Constantin Apăvăloaie and corporal Alexandru Belate. Furthermore, lieutenant Ionel Jora was killed by the son of a suspect he had apprehended.

=== Method ===
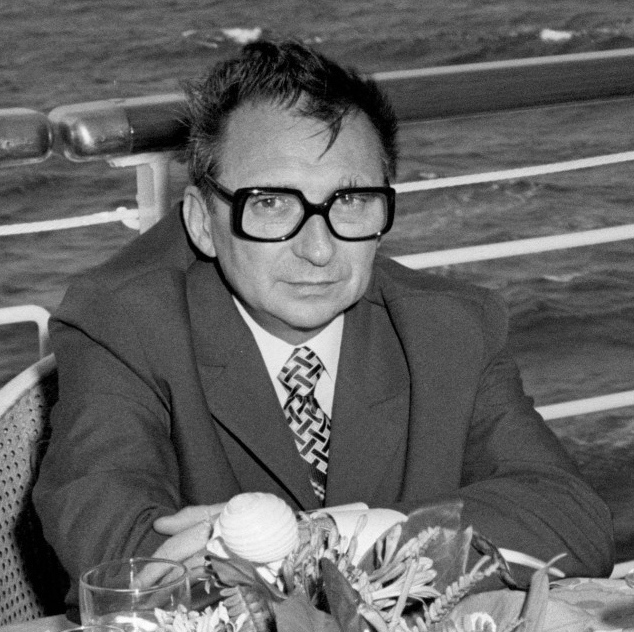
Ion Mihai Pacepa in 1975

The Securitate surveillance took place in different ways: general intelligence surveillance (supraveghere informativă generală, abbreviated "S.I.G."); priority intelligence surveillance (supraveghere informativă prioritară, abbreviated "S.I.P."); clearance file (mapă de verificare, abbreviated "M.V."); individual surveillance dossier (dosar de urmărire individuală, abbreviated "D.U.I."); target dossier (dosar de obiectiv), the target being, for example, an institute, a hospital, a school, or a company; case dossier (dosar de problemă), the targets being former political prisoners, former Iron Guard members, religious organizations, etc.; and element dossier (dosar de mediu), targeting writers, priests, etc.

In the 1980s, the Securitate launched a massive campaign to stamp out dissent in Romania, manipulating the country's population with vicious rumors (such as supposed contacts with Western intelligence agencies), machinations, frameups, public denunciations, encouraging conflict between segments of the population, public humiliation of dissidents, toughened censorship and the repression of even the smallest gestures of independence by intellectuals. Often the term "intellectual" was used by the Securitate to describe dissidents who had higher education qualifications, such as college and university students, writers, directors, and scientists, who opposed the philosophy of the Romanian Communist Party. Assassinations were also used to silence dissent, such as the attempt to kill high-ranking defector Ion Mihai Pacepa, who received two death sentences from Romania in 1978, and on whose head Ceaușescu decreed a bounty of two million US dollars. Yasser Arafat and Muammar al-Gaddafi each added one more million dollars to the reward. In the 1980s, Securitate officials allegedly hired Carlos the Jackal to assassinate Pacepa.

Forced entry into homes and offices and the planting of microphones was another tactic the Securitate used to extract information from the general population. Telephone conversations were routinely monitored, and all internal and international fax and telex communications were intercepted. In August 1977, when the Jiu Valley coal miners' unions went on strike, several leaders died prematurely, and it was later discovered that Securitate doctors had subjected them to five-minute chest X-rays in an attempt to have them develop cancer. After birth rates fell, Securitate agents were placed in gynecological wards while regular pregnancy tests were made mandatory for women of child-bearing age, with severe penalties for anyone who was found to have terminated a pregnancy.

The Securitate's presence was so ubiquitous that it was believed one out of four Romanians was an informer. The Securitate deployed one agent or informer for every 43 Romanians, which was still a high enough proportion to make it practically impossible for dissidents to organize. The regime deliberately fostered this sense of ubiquity, believing that the fear of being watched was sufficient to bend the people to Ceaușescu's will. For example, one shadow group of dissidents limited itself to only three families; any more than that would have attracted Securitate attention. The East German Stasi was even more ubiquitous than the Securitate; counting informers, the Stasi had one spy for every 6.5 East Germans.

During the period 1980–1989, the Securitate recruited over 200,000 informants, the largest number in its history, and about a third of the estimated number of 650,000 collaborators dating back to 1948; in 1989 alone, more than 25,000 recruitments were carried out. According to CNSAS data, of those 200,000 new recruits, 158,000 were men. About 30,200 had higher education and more than 4,300 were students. Most collaborators came from the education area, approximately 8,500, and in second place were members of the clergy, almost 4,200. More than 3,600 doctors and nurses were informants, and 800 came from the legal professions. In the arts sector, over 1,000 recruits included 110 actors, 50 directors, 120 artists, 410 instrumentalists, 210 painters, and 55 sculptors. Less than 5% of the number of new informants (about 8,500) came from rural areas.

=== Downfall ===
After Ceaușescu was ousted, the new authorities broke up the Securitate, creating new agencies for its major functions; the SRI (Romanian Intelligence Service) (with internal tasks such as counterespionage), the SIE (Foreign Intelligence Service), the SPP (Protection and Guard Service) (the former Directorate V), the STS (Special Telecommunications Service) (the former General Directorate for Technical Operations), etc.

Today, the National Council for the Study of the Securitate Archives (abbreviated CNSAS, for Consiliul Național pentru Studierea Arhivelor Securității) "is the authority that administrates the archives of the former communist secret services in Romania and develops educational programs and exhibitions with the aim of preserving the memories of victims of the communist regime."

== Subdivisions ==
=== General Directorate for Technical Operations ===
The General Directorate for Technical Operations (Direcția Generală de Tehnică Operativă — DGTO) was an integral part of the Securitate' s activities. Established with the assistance of the KGB in the mid-1950s, the DGTO monitored all voice and electronic communications in the country. The DGTO intercepted all telephone, telegraph, and telex communications coming into and going out of the country. It secretly implanted microphones in public buildings and private residences to record ordinary conversations among citizens.

=== Directorate for Counterespionage ===
The Directorate for Counterespionage conducted surveillance against foreigners—Soviet nationals in particular—to monitor or impede their contacts with Romanians. It enforced a variety of restrictions preventing foreigners from residing with ordinary citizens, keeping them from gaining access to foreign embassy compounds and requesting asylum, and requiring them to report any contact with foreigners to the Securitate within twenty-four hours. Directorate IV was responsible for similar counterespionage functions within the armed forces, and its primary mission was identifying and neutralizing Soviet penetrations.

=== Directorate for Foreign Intelligence ===
The Directorate for Foreign Intelligence conducted Romania's espionage operations in other countries, such as those of Western Europe. Among those operations sanctioned by the Communist government were industrial espionage to obtain nuclear technology, and plots to assassinate dissidents, such as Matei Pavel Haiducu was tasked with, though he informed French authorities, faking the assassinations before defecting to France.

=== Directorate for Penitentiaries ===
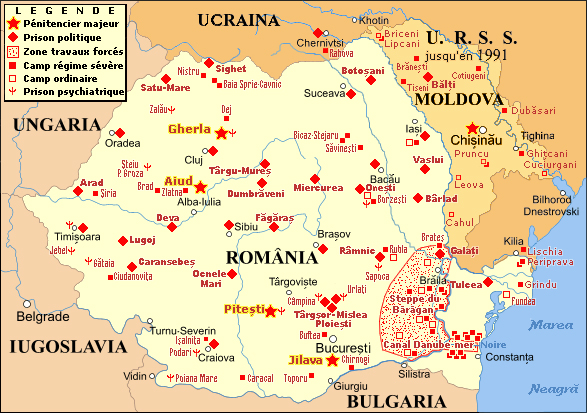
Repressive system in Romania and Moldova, 1946–1989

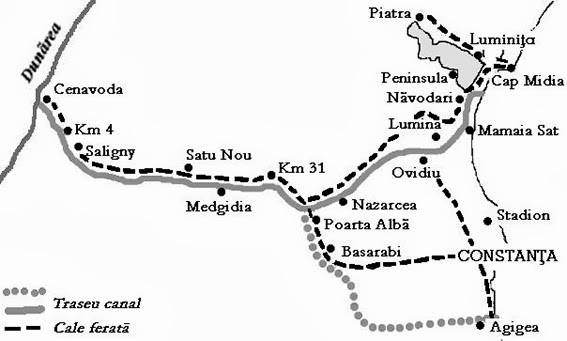
Map of forced labor camps along the Danube–Black Sea Canal

The Directorate for Penitentiaries operated Romania's prisons, which were notorious for their horrendous conditions. Prisoners were routinely beaten, denied medical attention, had their mail taken away from them, and sometimes even administered lethal doses of poison. Some of the harshest prisons were those at Aiud, Gherla, Pitești, Râmnicu Sarat, and Sighet, as well as the forced labor camps along the Danube–Black Sea Canal and at Periprava. From 1948 to 1955, the penitentiaries operated by this Directorate were grouped into 4 categories:

- Category I: Aiud, Gherla, Jilava.
- Category II: Arad, Caransebeș, Cluj, Constanța, Craiova, Făgăraș, Galați, Mărgineni, Mislea, Ocnele Mari, Oradea, Brașov, Pitești, Ploiești, Rahova, Suceava, Târgșor, Târgu Ocna, Timișoara, Văcărești.
- Category III: Alba Iulia, Bacău, Baia Mare, Botoșani, Brăila, Buzău, Cluj (minors), Dej, Deva, Dumbrăveni, Focșani, Iași, Rahova II, Râmnicu Sarat, Sibiu, Satu Mare, Sighet, Târgu Mureș.
- Category IV: Bârlad, Bistrița, Caracal, Carei, Călărași, Câmpulung Moldovenesc, Câmpulung Muscel, Codlea, Dăeni, Giurgiu, Făgăraș (local), Fălticeni, Dorohoi, Huși, Ișalnița, Lugoj, Miercurea Ciuc (women), Odorhei, Oravița, Petroșani, Piatra Neamț, Rădăuți, Râmnicu Vâlcea, Roman, Sfântu Gheorghe, Sighișoara, Sighet (local), Slatina, Târgoviște, Târgu Jiu, Tecuci, Tulcea, Turda, Turnu Măgurele, Turnu Severin, Vaslui, Zalău.

Gradually, a large number of penal colonies and labor camps were established as a form of political detention for administrative detainees and became an integral part of the penitentiary system. The most important ones were along the Danube–Black Sea Canal, the Brăila Swamp, and the lead mines in northern Romania. Specific locations included: Arad, Baia Mare, Baia Sprie, Bârcea Mare, Bicaz, Borzești, Brad, Brâncovenești, CRM Bucharest, Buzău, Capu Midia, Castelu, Cavnic, Câmpulung, Cernavodă, Chilia Constanța, Chirnogi, Crâscior, Culmea, Deduleşti, Doicești, Domnești, Dorobanțu, Dudu, Fântânele, Fundulea, Galeșu, Giurgeni, Ghencea, Iași, Ițcani, Km. 31, Lucăcești, Mărculești, Mogoșoaia, Nistru, Onești, Onești Baraj, Peninsula/Valea Neagră, Periprava, Periș, Poarta Albă, Roșia Montană, Roșia Pipera, Roznov, Salcia, Grădina, Băndoiu, Strâmba, Stoeneşti, Piatra-Frecăței, Saligny, Sibiu, Simeria, Slatina, Spanțov, Tătaru, Târnăveni, Toporu, Vlădeni, Zlatna.

=== Directorate for Internal Security ===
The Directorate for Internal Security was originally given the task of monitoring the activities going on in the PCR. But after Ion Mihai Pacepa's defection in 1978 and his exposing details of the Ceaușescu regime, such as the collaboration with Arab radical groups, massive espionage on American industry targets and elaborate efforts to rally Western political support, international infiltration and espionage in the Securitate only increased, much to Ceaușescu's anger. In order to solve this problem the entire division was reorganized and was charged with rooting out dissent in the PCR. A top secret division of this Directorate was formed from forces loyal personally to Ceaușescu and charged with monitoring the Securitate itself. It acted almost as a Securitate for the Securitate, and was responsible for bugging the phones of other Securitate officers and PCR officials to ensure total loyalty.

=== National Commission for Visas and Passports ===
The National Commission for Visas and Passports controlled all travel and immigration in and out of Romania. In effect, traveling abroad was all but impossible for anyone but highly placed Party officials, and any ordinary Romanian who applied for a passport was immediately placed under surveillance. Many Jews and ethnic Germans were given passports and exit visas through tacit agreements with the Israeli and West German governments.

=== Directorate for Security Troops ===
The Directorate for Security Troops acted as a paramilitary force for the government, equipped with artillery and armoured personnel carriers. The security troops selected new recruits from the same annual pool of conscripts that the armed services used. Organized in the late 1940s to defend the new regime, in 1989 the security troops had 20,000 soldiers.

The security troops were directly responsible through the Minister of the Interior to Ceaușescu. They guarded important installations including PCR county and central office buildings and radio and television stations. The Ceaușescu regime presumably could call the security troops into action as a private army to defend itself against a military coup d'état or other domestic challenges and to suppress antiregime riots, demonstrations, or strikes.

To ensure total loyalty amongst these crack troops, there were five times as many political officers in the Directorate for Security Troops as there were in the regular army. They adhered to stricter discipline than in the regular military, but were rewarded with special treatment and enjoyed far superior living conditions compared to their countrymen.

After the Romanian Revolution of 1989, the Directorate for Security Troops was disbanded and replaced first by the Guard and Order Troops (Trupele de Pază și Ordine), and in July 1990 by the Gendarmerie.

=== Directorate for Militia ===
The Directorate for Militia controlled Romania's Miliția, the standard police force, which carried out regular policing tasks such as traffic control, public order, etc. In 1990 it was replaced by the Romanian Police.

=== Directorate V ===
Directorate V were bodyguards for important governmental officials. Colonel Dumitru Burlan was the chief of bodyguards of President Nicolae Ceaușescu, and served once as his stand-in (double), but was not able to protect Ceaușescu from arrest and execution during the Romanian Revolution of 1989.

== Directors ==
- Gheorghe Pintilie (1948–1959)
- Ion Stănescu (1968–1972)
- Nicolae Doicaru (1972–1978)
- Tudor Postelnicu (1978–1987)
- Iulian Vlad (1987–1989)

== Funding ==
=== IKEA ===
In the 1980s under the rule of the Romanian Communist Dictator Nicolae Ceaușescu, Romania's secret police, the 'Securitate', received six-figure payments from IKEA. According to declassified files at the National College for Studying the Securitate Archives, IKEA agreed to overcharge for products made in Romania and some of the overpayment funds were deposited into an account controlled by the Securitate.

== See also ==
- List of senior Securitate officers
- Re-education in Communist Romania
- Radu (weapon)
- Romanian Hearth Union
- KGB, Soviet security service and secret police
- State Protection Authority, Hungarian secret police
- Stasi, East German security service and secret police
- StB, Czechoslovak secret police
- Ministry of Public Security (Poland), secret police of communist Poland
- Mobile Brigade

== Notes ==
This article incorporates text from this source, which is in the public domain. Country Studies. Federal Research Division.
