= Mihăileni, Botoșani =

Commune in Botoșani County, Romania

Mihăileni
- Commune
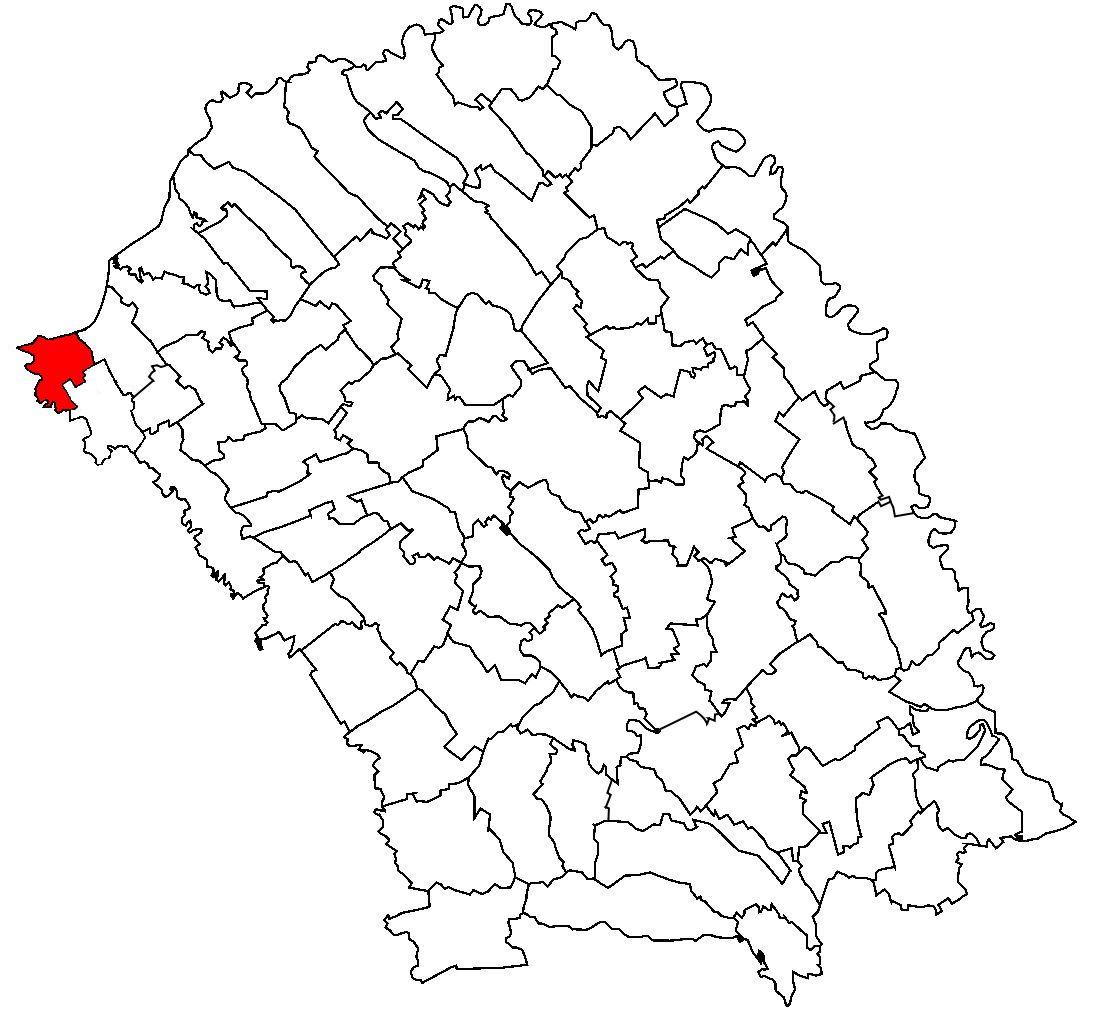
- Location in Botoșani County

- Location in Romania
- Coordinates: 47°58′N 26°08′E
- Country: Romania
- County: Botoșani
- Subdivisions: Mihăileni, Pârâu Negru, Rogojești

Government
  - Mayor (2024–2028): Ioan Laurențiu Barbacariu (PSD)
- Area: 34.62 km^{2} (13.37 sq mi)
- Population (2021-12-01): 2,075
  - Density: 59.94/km^{2} (155.2/sq mi)
- Time zone: UTC+02:00 (EET)
  - Summer (DST): UTC+03:00 (EEST)
- Postal code: 717260
- Area code: +40 x31
- Vehicle reg.: BT

Mihăileni is a commune in Botoșani County, Romania. It is composed of three villages: Mihăileni, Pârâu Negru and Rogojești, with a total population of 2,283 as of 2011.

Rogojești and the former village of Sinăuții de Jos (now part of Mihăileni) are located in Bukovina, while the rest of Mihăileni and Pârâu Negru are in Western Moldavia. Mihăileni was established in 1792, subsequent to the opening of a customs checkpoint between Austria and Moldavia.

At the 2011 census, 83.4% of inhabitants were Romanians and 14.3% Ukrainians. At the 2002 census, 89% were Romanian Orthodox and 8.7% Pentecostal.

== Natives ==
- Ury Benador
- Idov Cohen
- Leo Goldhammer
- Petru Manoliu
- Ion Păun-Pincio
- Florica Racovitză-Flondor
- Martin Strelisker
