= Botoșani Prison =

Prison in Botoșani, Romania

- Interactive map of Botoșani Prison
- Location: Botoșani, Romania; 47.735°N 26.692°E
- Population: 783 (December 2023)
- Opened: 1879
- Managed by: Administrația Națională a Penitenciarelor
- Director: Dumitru-Daniel Pînzariu
- Website: anp.gov.ro/penitenciarul-botosani/

Botoșani Prison (Romanian: Penitenciarul Botoșani) is a prison located in Botoșani, Romania.

== History ==
=== Old building ===
A house of correction first existed in Botoșani as early as 1832. The first dedicated prison was established in 1879 near the courthouse. Built of brick on a stone foundation, it was originally a boyar residence. It had a capacity of 359 detainees, with an average of around 300. Until 1944, common criminals with sentences of up to six months were held there. Peasants arrested during the 1907 revolt were also sent there. According to a 1967 text, food was scarce and conditions harsh, including corporal punishment and shackles for prisoners working outside the walls. Members of the Iron Guard served time at Botoșani, including several who were executed in September 1939, following the assassination of Armand Călinescu; their skeletons were discovered in 1963.

From 1944 to 1952, under the nascent communist regime, Botoșani held political prisoners and common criminals; only the latter from that year until 1957; then both until August 1964. Revolting peasants from surrounding villages were imprisoned there in 1949. An area for female prisoners existed. Prisoners from western Romania were rushed to Botoșani after the Hungarian Revolution of 1956. Medical care was practically nonexistent after the prison doctor quit in 1950, having not been paid for five years. Prisoners wallowed in filth, unwashed, unshaven, their cells infected, chamber pots left full. Constantin Ticu Dumitrescu described a beating on the spine he received from three guards that left him unconscious.

=== New building ===
Due to poor conditions and the risk of collapse, the prison was moved to new quarters in 1957. Located at the southeastern edge of the city, the building dated to 1899. Previously, it had served as a barracks for the most part, with stints as a military warehouse and an officers’ school, before being used by the Securitate secret police in 1949–1957. It had three wings of two floors each with a total capacity of nearly 1,900 people. On average, it held 2,000 prisoners, of whom some 1,300 were political, mostly National Peasantists and Liberals. Executions took place within: for instance, anti-communist partisan Vasile Motrescu in 1958. Torture was applied in order to subdue detainees. A number of priests who aided the partisans were incarcerated there. One of them, Petre Hagiu, died imprisoned in 1961, one of numerous political prisoners to die at Botoșani. The military took over part of the complex in 1964, after which only common criminals remained and the capacity fell to 450.

Botoșani was the site of a "re-education" process in the early 1960s. The objective was to apply pressure on often-exhausted prisoners to repent of their affiliation with banned political parties, sometimes dangling the prospect of freedom in case of cooperation. Applying methods tested in communist China, prisoners would be made to proclaim their loyalty to the regime, their solidarity with one another broken and their status as dissidents eliminated. Some, in prison for over a decade, were given tours where they witnessed the achievements of the regime. Cooperative detainees received lighter treatment, such as goods they had not enjoyed for years, and were obliged to sign an agreement to continue serving the regime. One such prisoner was Alexandru Paleologu, who had to write two "very violent and brutal" articles against exile writers Mihail Fărcășanu (a former friend) and Emil Cioran. Writing with "enormous pleasure" as he felt he was returning to his profession, Paleologu was freed soon after.

== Current use ==
As of December 2023, there were 783 inmates at Botoșani Penitenciary, held in a semi-open regime or under preventive arrest (with sentences of up to three years). The facility serves 28 courts and criminal prosecutions within Botoșani and Suceava counties. The current director of the penitentiary is Dumitru-Daniel Pînzariu.
