= Ion Dezideriu Sîrbu =

Romanian writer

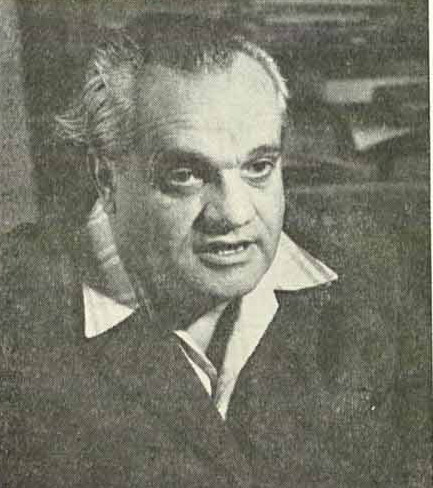
- Ion D. Sîrbu, photo published in Teatrul Magazine, March 1977
- Born: June 28, 1919; Petrila, Hunedoara County, Kingdom of Romania
- Died: September 17, 1989 (aged 70); Craiova, Dolj County, Socialist Republic of Romania
- Resting place: Sineasca Cemetery, Craiova, Romania
- Education: University of Cluj
- Occupations: Philosopher; novelist; essayist; dramatist
- Writing career
- Notable works: Adio, Europa!

Academic background
- Thesis: The epistemological function of metaphor (1947)
- Doctoral advisor: Liviu Rusu

Ion Dezideriu Sîrbu (also spelled Ion Desideriu Sârbu; June 28, 1919 – September 17, 1989) was a Romanian philosopher, novelist, essayist, and dramatist. An academic and theater critic, he was a victim of the communist regime, spending about 14 years as a political prisoner.

== Early life, education and war ==
Sîrbu was born in Petrila, Hunedoara County; his father was a coal miner from around Brad, while his mother had come from Bohemia to settle in Banat. After completing elementary school in his native city, he attended gymnasium and high school in Petroșani, although, due to lack of funds, he had to drop out in 1934 for one year and work as an apprentice in a factory before being able to continue his studies. In 1939, he enrolled in the courses of the Faculty of Letters and Philosophy at the University of Cluj, where the philosopher and writer Lucian Blaga became his teacher and mentor.

After the Romanian branch of the university moved to Sibiu in September 1940, in the wake of the occupation of Northern Transylvania by Hungary, a group comprising Blaga and other intellectuals from Cluj settled there and formed the Sibiu Literary Circle. Sîrbu was active in this literary group, alongside Ion Negoițescu, Radu Stanca, Ștefan Augustin Doinaș, Cornel Regman, Eugen Todoran, Ovidiu Cotruș, and others. His stories and satirical plays could not be published, though they circulated in manuscript among the members of the group. He made his journalistic debut in 1940 in the newspaper Țara from Sibiu and his literary debut in 1941 with the story "Dumineca", in the magazine Curțile dorului.

During World War II, he was conscripted and sent to the Eastern Front (1941–1944); he served as an artillery sergeant, reaching Stalingrad, where he was taken prisoner by the Soviets, yet managed to escape. After Romania switched sides to the Allies in August 1944, he was a translator on the western front until the end of the war.

In 1945, he received his degree from the University of Cluj, with the thesis "From the archetypes of C.G. Jung to the abyssal categories of Lucian Blaga", supervised by Blaga himself.

== Career; persecution under Communist regime ==
In 1946, he became a teaching assistant to Liviu Rusu in the Department of Aesthetics and Literary Criticism. In 1947, he defended his doctoral thesis on "The epistemological function of metaphor" and became the youngest university lecturer in the country at the Conservatory of Theater Art in Cluj.

In December 1949, he was excluded from university education, the new communist regime finding reactionary ideas in his philosophical and literary writings. The real reason seems to have been the refusal of a denunciation against his mentor, Blaga. Subsequently, he would earn his living working as a substitute teacher at a secondary school in Baia de Arieș (1950) and at various high schools in Cluj (1950–1955). In the period 1955–1956, he was the editorial secretary of the Revista de pedagogie from Bucharest and, later, editor of the magazine Teatrul (1956–1957).

Sîrbu was arrested by the Securitate on September 17, 1957, for failure to collaborate with the secret police and incriminate his friend Doinaș. After being detained and interrogated until the end of 1958, he was sentenced without trial, simply at the directive of General Alexandru Nicolschi, first to 2 years and then to 7 years in prison, under the charge of "conspiring against the regime". The fact that he refused to denounce his mentor, Blaga, worsened his detention conditions. Sîrbu was incarcerated at the notorious Jilava and Gherla prisons, and was sent to do forced labor at the Grindu, Salcia, and Periprava labor camps of the Brăila Swamp and Danube Delta labor camp system. In the penal colony from Salcia he labored together with Alexandru Paleologu, Alexandru Zub, and Sergiu Al-George. Upon being pardoned and released from prison in February 1963, he was, in turn, a train driver at the coal mine in Petrila, a machinist at the Theater in Petroșani, and a literary secretary at the Theater in Craiova, the city where he was forced to live.

Although released, his nightmare will last all his life, being followed non-stop by the Securitate; his colleagues and friends were forced to denounce him, his house in Craiova was surrounded by microphones, and, "because leper is written on my door," he felt completely marginalized.

Sîrbu was known to his friends as Gary (after Gary Cooper). He served as model for Victor Petrini, the hero of Marin Preda's novel, Cel mai iubit dintre pământeni. In 1989, he finalized his memoirs, Jurnalul unui jurnalist fără jurnal ("Diary of a journalist without a journal"), on which he had been working for five years. Later that year, he died in Craiova of esophageal cancer, at age 70. According to a report by the Securitate (who followed him to the end), the writer was buried at the Sineasca Cemetery, with the obituary being delivered on behalf of the Writers Union by Ștefan Augustin Doinaș. His main novel, Adio, Europa! ("Adieu, Europe!"), was published posthumously.

== Recognition ==
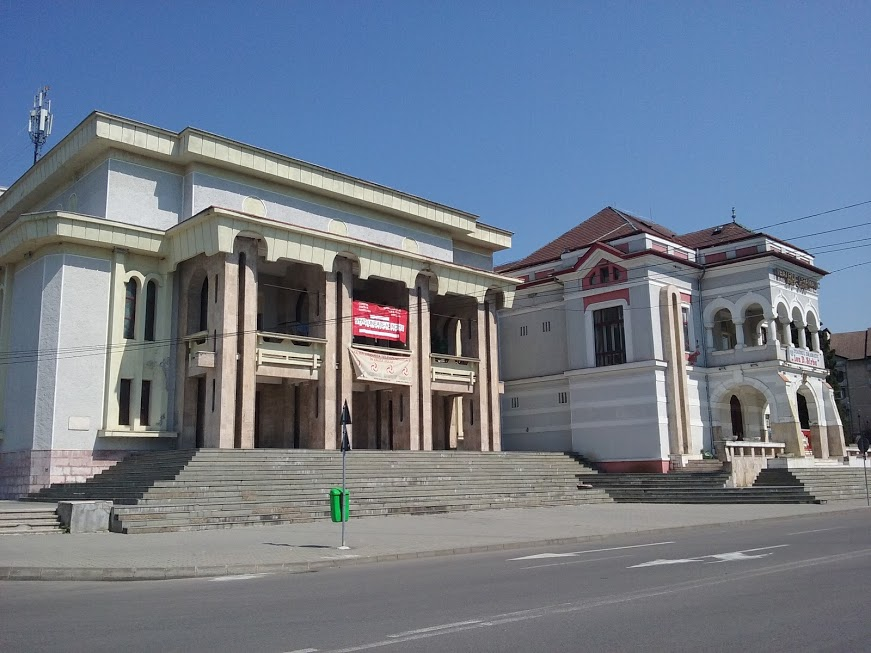
The Ion D. Sîrbu Theatre in Petroșani

Writer and literary critic Monica Lovinescu said of him, "around his works we could rebuild ourselves as a people".

A gymnasial school in Petrila, as well as streets in Craiova and Petrila are named after him. His native town also features the Ion D. Sîrbu Memorial House, while the city of Petroșani is the home of the Ion D. Sîrbu Theatre. In 2009 he was conferred the title of honorary citizen of Petroșani.
