= Florin Pavlovici =

Romanian political prisoner and writer (1936–2021)

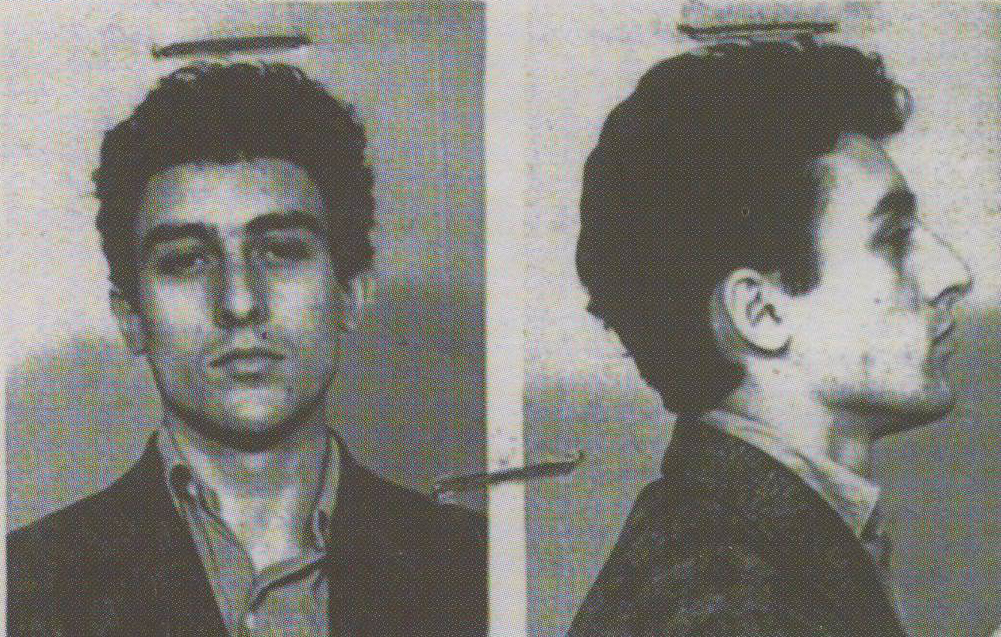
- Pavlovici's mugshot on his arrest, 1959
- Born: Florin Constantin Pavlovici; 14 March 1936; Concești, Botoșani County, Kingdom of Romania
- Died: 13 December 2021 (aged 85); Bucharest, Romania
- Resting place: Bucharest
- Education: University of Bucharest
- Occupation: Memoirist
- Writing career
- Notable works: Basics of Torture; Fear and Watch

Florin Constantin Pavlovici (14 March 1936 – 13 December 2021) was a Romanian writer and memoirist.

== Biography ==
Florin Constantin Pavlovici was born in Concești, Botoșani County, to school teachers Hareta and Dionisie Pavlovici. He studied journalism at the University of Bucharest, in the Philosophy department, and graduated in 1958. Arrested on 2 February 1959 and accused of conspiracy against the communist social order, he was sentenced by the Bucharest Military Court to five years of incarceration. He initially served his sentence at Jilava and Gherla prisons, then at Brăila Swamp labor camps (Salcia labor camp and Periprava labor camp). He was released on 31 January 1964.

Pavlovici was the author of two books: Basics of Torture (Romanian: Tortura, Pe Înțelesul Tuturor, or literally: Torture, for Everyone's Understanding), which is a memoir of his time spent in detention, and Fear and Watch (Romanian: Frica și Pânda), about the difficulties of integrating back into Romanian communist society after his release, being constantly harassed by the Securitate secret police.

Both his books were well received by critics. Published in 2001, Basics of Torture received the Literary Special Debut Award of the Writers' Union of Romania; it was referenced in the Romanian Literature Dictionary, published by the Romanian Academy, and in the works and essays of several other notable historians and critics. It is considered a representative landmark in the Romanian literature inspired by communist political repression.

Pavlovici died on 13 December 2021, at the age of 85.

== The Basics of Torture ==
As in most memoirs of political detention, the book follows the classic structure of arrest, interrogation under torture, show trial, sentencing, temporary prison, and the final destination of a prison or labor camp. In 1959, a friend and former university colleague, Dumitru Filip, is criticized during a Workers Youth Union meeting. In response, he hands over to the secret police a number of letters, written by those who criticized him and not only, some years old, in which they spoke about the communist abuse during collectivization, the lying, ongoing propaganda and intellectual quality of the communist officials. Pavlovici is arrested and taken to the Ministry of Internal Affairs for cross-examination (the inquisitor's name was Constantin Voicu). He is brutally beaten during the investigation, and after a show trial held on 5 June 1959, he receives a 5-year sentence under the charge of "conspiracy against the communist social order".

The first destination is Salcia labor camp, where he arrives at the beginning of September 1959. Here, the prisoners had to raise a dam that was supposed to protect the Great Brăila Island – where massive swamp drains were performed in order to make the terrain tillable – from floodings caused by the Danube. The dam was started from both Salcia and Stoenești labor camp and the workers were supposed to meet in the middle. In Spring 1962, Pavlovici is moved to Strâmba labor camp, and from here – because of the camp being flooded – in the Danube Delta, on the Chilia branch at the sea shore. Here, they were kept on two barges, and their task was similar to the one at Salcia, to raise a dam that would protect land from floods. Later the same year, he is moved to Grindu working site, a satellite of Periprava labor camp, where prisoners spent the winter transporting wood from the Letea Forest. In summer of 1963, there was a triage of former typhoid fever sufferings and Pavlovici falsely reports he had the disease before incarceration, counting on the fact that the camp officials were not able to check this out, due to lack of proper medical equipment. This group was later moved to Gherla Prison, where Pavlovici would spend the remaining prison time, until his liberation, on 31 January 1964.

When building the Great Island dam, detainees had to excavate and transport 3.2 m^{3} (110 cu ft) of soil per day, sometimes from hundred of meters away. Heat, cold, beatings, hunger, diseases, exhaustion, and humiliation were constant. In November and December 1959, approximately 60 people died each month at Salcia.

During winter, when quotes cannot be attained, they are beaten by the guards with sticks over the bottom. Many of the inmates are intellectuals, teachers, priests, doctors. To help pass the time when working was not possible, many held conferences in the cells, sharing their teachings while some were listening sitting on the bucket. One day, being too sick for work, Pavlovici refuses to leave the prisoner barracks. Assistance does not arrive from the camp hospital, but from a camp guard.

"All of a sudden, sergeant major Negoița appeared in the door frame. He was checking the barrack for late workers. With eyes meant for practiced hunters, he saw me on spot. Young, athletic, sergeant major Negoița was a beautiful man, blond, with shining blue eyes, straw colored hair, pouring down in stripes from under the helmet. Dashing and cheerful, he looked like a Soviet actor who specialized in heroic roles. Wide shoulders, tight hips and, underneath his well fitted uniform, the harmonious pack of muscles was remarkable. What was such a perfect specimen doing in that place was an enigma to me. His rightful place was in the arena, on the running track, or in the swimming pool, breaking records and bathing in the ovations of the crowd. He came towards me and, without any effort or soar, floating like, jumped straight onto my bed, which was a meter and a half high. [...] He gave me this long, genteel look, full of compassion. Recalling my childhood, when I fell ill, his bright eyes, as blue and serene as my grandmothers, were bringing comfort. I knew then that the man standing in front of me will help, that he will call the doctor, and if not will carry me himself all the way to the infirmary. He did not choose this beaten track, but one of total involvement. All of a sudden, bending his knees and arching his legs, with the same ease that brought him up onto the bed, he jumped with both feet on my chest. And he started to walk. Methodical, and passionate. His favorite strolling place were my chest and abdomen, but he was not reluctant towards my head or feet as well. He was dancing on top of me like he was at a weeding. [...]It felt more like a initiation dance, a ritual born to an ancient culture where the dancer became one with the healer, and the dancing healer became one with the suffering. On the other hand, witchdoctor Negoița showed a profound respect towards his patient. His treatment sought every muscle, every piece of meat, and did not overlook the bones, a possible source of the disease.""

— Florin Constantin Pavlovici, Tortura, Pe Înțelesul Tuturor, p. 99

== See also ==
- Ion Ioanid
- Nicolae Steinhardt
- Ion Gavrilă Ogoranu
- Socialist Republic of Romania
