= Periprava labor camp =

Labor camp in Romania

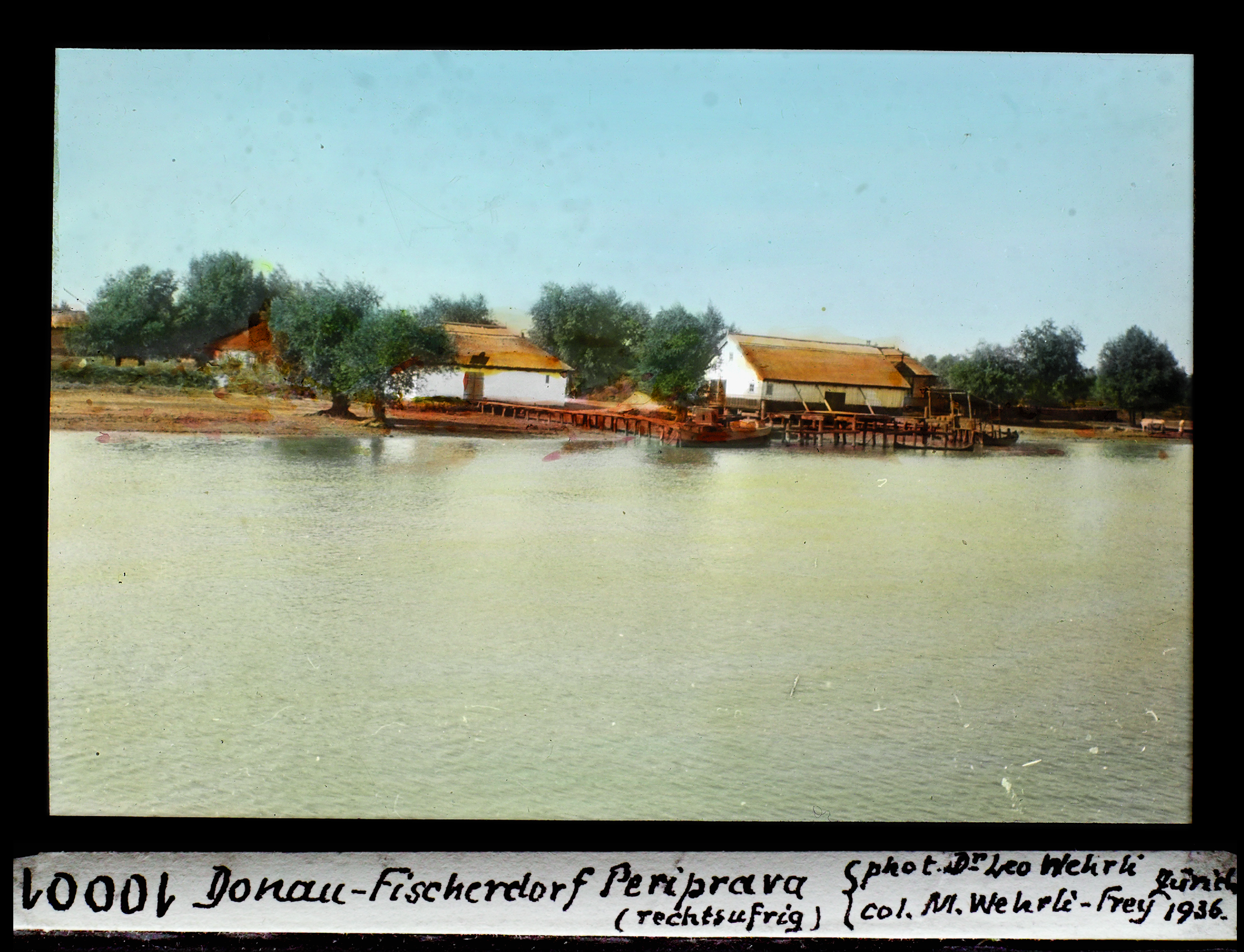
- The village of Periprava in 1936
- Interactive map of Periprava labor camp
- Location: Periprava, Tulcea County, Romanian People's Republic; 45°18′N 29°34′E
- Status: Defunct
- Capacity: 2,000
- Population: Political prisoners
- Opened: July 1, 1957
- Closed: 1963
- Director: Ioan Ficior

Notable prisoners
- Florin Pavlovici, Mitică Popescu, Mihai Rădulescu, Ion Dezideriu Sîrbu

The Periprava labor camp was a labor camp operated by the Romanian communist regime, part of the Brăila Swamp labor camps. The camp, located near the village of Periprava in the Danube Delta, held up to 2,000 prisoners. According to a study done by the International Centre for Studies into Communism, 8.23% of political prisoners in Communist Romania did time at Periprava. In the literature on communist prisons and camps in Romania, the Periprava labor camp is described as one of the harshest places of imprisonment. In view of the extremely severe detention and work regime, sheer terror, and high mortality, the camp is known among former detainees as a true "death camp".

== Labor camp ==
The main facility of the labor camp was next to Periprava village; other detention facilities in the area were at Sfiștofca, Grindu, Letea, C. A. Rosetti, and on ferries. In the early 1950s, Periprava was a section of the Chilia Formation; it became an independent prison on July 1, 1957. The official designation for the camp was Facility 0830 (Formațiunea 0830). Exposed to scorching heat and mosquito swarms in the summer and icy winds in the winter, the prisoners lived in brick-walled, 24 m^{2} pens that held up to 160 men each. They spent their days cutting reeds and building dams; those who were unable to fulfill the daily quota of 8 thick bundles of reeds were beat unconscious by guards wielding rubber clubs.

According to testimony in 2013 by Andrei Muraru, then head of the Institute for the Investigation of Communist Crimes in Romania, this "was an extermination camp; it was a repressive, excessive, inhuman and discretionary regime". Detainees were overworked, beaten, left without heat, and forced to drink dirty water from the Danube, leading to widespread dysentery. Also according to Muraru, later an adviser to President Klaus Iohannis, the inmates were subjected to a "diabolic program of extermination through exhausting work, hunger and physical torture". The youngest inmate to die at Periprava was 19 and the oldest 71. The deaths were due to exhaustion, hunger, cold, and torture; some of the detainees were shot as they attempted to escape the camp. At least 124 prisoners, most of them political ones, are believed to have died in the Periprava labor camp. Marieta Hrabanov, who was with her husband in the camp since 1958, remembers: "Not a day went by without seeing how they took away a man beaten to death. They stripped them to the skin, tied their hands and feet with wire, and threw them like dogs."

== Detainees ==
Periprava was one of the places of detention of Romanian writer Florin Pavlovici, described by him in his memoirs. Other writers who were imprisoned at Periprava were Mihai Rădulescu and Ion Dezideriu Sîrbu. Actor Mitică Popescu spent 3 months on forced labor at Periprava.

Most of the prisoners were young, having been arrested after the suppression of the Hungarian Revolution of 1956 and the ensuing student protests in Bucharest (many of the older politicians had been already exterminated by then at Sighet, Aiud, and other prisons). According to Pavlovici, many of the detainees were peasants who had resisted the collectivization of agriculture imposed by the communist authorities in the 1950s. Among them were 30–40 men from Răstoaca who had attacked a convoy of Party members (which included Nicolae Ceaușescu) that had come to convince the locals to join in the collectivization effort.

== Camp commander ==
Ioan Ficior was the commander of the camp from 1958 to 1963. In September 2013, he was indicted for genocide before the High Court of Cassation and Justice in Bucharest. Ficior was convicted in March 2017 for crimes against humanity, and sentenced to 20 years in prison for the deaths of 103 political inmates at Periprava; he died at Jilava Prison in September 2018, at age 90.

== Aftermath ==
In 2018, teams of historians and archaeologists were searching for the remains of prisoners from the former Periprava labor camp who were either executed or died from a lack of medical care. Investigators have found skeletons of former prisoners who appeared to have been dumped naked into unmarked mass graves; their clothing was retained by the administration of the camp. As of 2019, 40 human remains have been discovered at Periprava; plans call for DNA testing and identification of the victims. According to Marius Oprea, 51 unmarked graves of prisoners who died at the Periprava labor camp have been identified as of June 2020. By September 2020, the remains of 54 political detainees had been uncovered at Periprava; by August 2022, the number had increased to 71.
