= Dincă =

Dincă is a Romanian surname. Notable people with the surname include:

- Alexandru Dincă (handballer) (1945–2012), Romanian handballer
- Alexandru Dincă (journalist) (1936–1998), Romanian journalist
- Ion Dincă (1928–2007), Romanian politician
- Mircea Dincă, Romanian chemist
- Nicoleta Dincă (born 1988), Romanian handballer

== See also ==
- Dinca, Michigan, an unincorporated community
