= Alexandru Dincă =

Alexandru Dincă is the name of:

- Alexandru Dincă (journalist) (1936–1998), Romanian journalist and anti-communist activist
- Alexandru Dincă (handballer) (1945–2012), Romanian handball player
