= Mihai Rădulescu =

Romanian writer (1936–2009)

Mihai Rădulescu (Romanian pronunciation: [miˈhaj rəduˈlesku]; May 15, 1936 – January 20, 2009) was a Romanian novelist, poet, historian, and art critic.

He was born in Bucharest, the only child of Dumitru and Toni Rădulescu. After attending French schools in his native city, he enrolled in the School of English Studies, Department of Letters at the University of Bucharest. In November 1956, while he was a second year student, he was arrested for participating in a political protest, and sentenced to 4 years of imprisonment, which he spent at the Jilava and Gherla prisons and the Periprava, Salcia, and Luciu-Giurgeni camps of the Brăila Swamp labor camps system. In 1963, he restarted his studies, graduating from the same School of English Studies of the University of Bucharest, where he studied with Zoe Dumitrescu-Bușulenga. He then became a high school teacher, a junior lecturer at his alma mater, and, from 1979 a lecturer in English and French at the Theological Institute in Bucharest.

After the Romanian Revolution of 1989, he started the publishing company "Ramida". He died in Bucharest at age 72.

== Books ==
- Capcanele vocabularului englez - Andrei Bantaș and Mihai Rădulescu, Editura Stiințifică, 1967
- Violonistica enesciană: violonistul Enescu: creația enesciană pentru vioară, Editura Muzicală, 1971
- Shakespeare – un psiholog modern, Albatros, 1979
- Educația prin muncă a elevilor: schițe pedagogice, Editura Didactică si Pedagogică, 1981
- Civilizația armenilor, Editura Sport-Turism, 1983
- Stilistica spectacolului: elemente de stilistică antropologică în teatru, Editura Junimea, 1985
- Mozart: șapte zile pentru nemurire, Editura Muzicală, 1987
- O vizită la Regele Mihai I, Editura Semnalul, 1990
- Pe bulevard în jos: schițe și nuvele, Editura Literă, 1990
- False friends - Andrei Bantaș and Mihai Rădulescu, Editura Teora, 1992
- Tragedia lui Lucrețiu Pătrășcanu: convorbiri cu omul politic Corneliu Coposu, Editura Ramida, 1992
- Sânge pe Râul Doamnei: Până când atâta suferință?, Editura Ramida, 1992
- Caidul: nuvelele adolescenței în temnițele comuniste, Editura Ramida, 1992
- Dactilografele și revoluția, Editura Ramida, 1993
- Casa lacrimilor neplânse: martor al acuzării in procesul "reeducatorilor", Editura Ramida, 1993
- Ion Mihalache: În infruntare cu Carol II, Editura Ramida, 1993
- Rugul Aprins. Duhovnicii Ortodoxiei, sub lespezi, în gherlele comuniste, Editura Ramida, 1993
- Împușcarea călărețului, Editura Ramida, 1994
- Martiriul Bisericii Ortodoxe Romane, Editura Ramida, 1994
- Codrul scufundat: la 50 ani de la moartea lui Liviu Rebreanu, Editura Ramida, 1994
- Evadarea lui Liviu Rebreanu, Editura Ramida, 1994
- Popa Piso din Zărnești, Editura Ramida, 1994
- Condamnat să învingă, Editura Ramida, 1995
- Antropologia stilistică: lumea lui Charles Dickens, Editura Ramida, 1995
- Flăcări sub cruce, Editura Ramida, 1995
- Testament între înger și diavol, Editura Ramida, 1995
- Un viitor călugăr greco-catolic din preajma "Rugului aprins"; în colaborare cu Pericle Martinescu și Justin Paven), Editura Ramida, 1996
- Alcovul secret" din volumul de povestiri: "Decameronul din Nowhershire, sub pseudonimul Alquain Foggrery (publicat la Editura F.F.Press, într-o primă ediție, 1996; a doua apariție la Editura Ramida)
- Haiku-urile putrezirii de viu, Editura Ramida, 1996
- Dubla personalitate în Renaștere: studiu monografic de antropologie stilistică, Editura Ramida, 1996
- Morții noștri vii din temnițe. Sonete, Editura Ramida, 1997
- Preoți în cătușe, în colaborare cu Irineu Slătineanu, Editura Ramida, 1997
- Antim Ivireanul: învățător, scriitor, personaj, Fundația "Antim Ivireanul", 1997
- Rugul Aprins de la Mănăstirea Antim la Aiud, Editura Ramida, 1998
- Patru eseuri despre Mircea Eliade, Editura Ramida, 1998
- Istoria literaturii române de detenție: Vol. 1 - Memorialistica reeducărilor; Vol. 2 - Mărturisirea colaborării, Editura Ramida, 1998
- Morala practică pentru creștinul incepător, Editura Ramida, 1999
- Bucuriile și mâhnirile părintelui Sisoe din Boteni, Editura Ramida, 1999
- Jocul cu moartea: insemnări, pagini de jurnal și corespondență (1933–1957), Editura Humanitas, 1999
- Iubirea ca pasărea cerului și alte povestiri, Editura Ramida, 1999
- Genealogia românească. Istoric și bibliografie, Editura Istros - Muzeul Brăilei, 2000
- Memorie și strămosi, Editura Albatros, 2002
- Chemarea lui Dumnezeu în temnițele comuniste. Vol. I, Editura Agapis, 2002
- Hrandt, Editura Ararat, 2002
- Întemnițarea Părintelui Nicodim, Editura Agapis, 2003
- Însemnări pe "Calendarul meu" de Radu Gyr, Fundația Prof. George Manu, 2003
- Rugul Aprins. Arestare. Condamnare. Achitare, Editura Agapis, 2003
- Chemarea lui Dumnezeu în temnițele comuniste. Vol. II, Editura Agapis, 2004
- La capătul iadului: mărturii și documente, Editura Vremea, 2005
- Sandu Tudor și "Floarea de foc", Editura Panaghia, 2008
- Grupul celor șapte: pictura canadiană, Editura Anca, 2008
- Hiroshige, Editura Maiko, 2008
- Calea cărții. Povestiri din viața Părintelui Nicodim Mandita, Editura Agapis, 2015
