= Alexandru Zub =

Romanian historian, biographer, essayist, political activist and academic

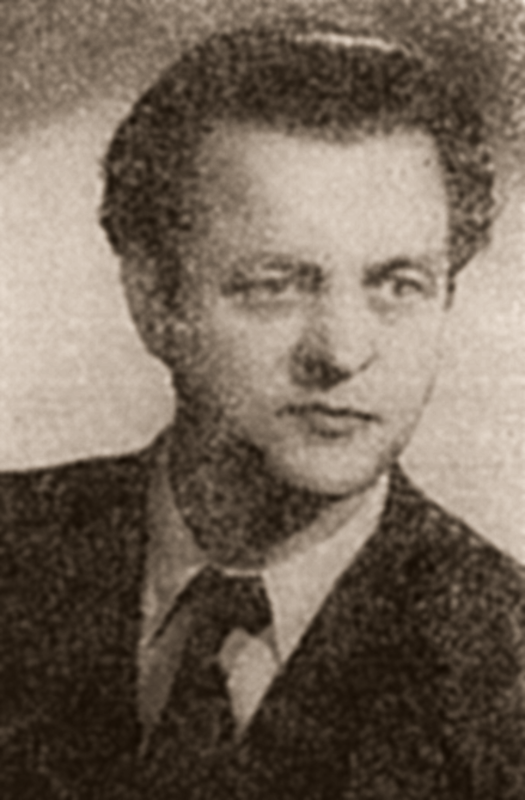
Zub, photographed c. 1980

Alexandru Zub (born October 12, 1934) is a Romanian historian, biographer, essayist, political activist and academic. A former professor at the University of Iași, noted for his contribution to the study of cultural history and Romanian history, he is currently head of the A.D. Xenopol Institute of History (an office he has held since 1990). He was elected a full member of the Romanian Academy in 2004 (having been a correspondent member since 1991); currently, he serves as head of the Academy's History Department.

A political prisoner during the early years of Communist Romania, and a known dissident, Zub was selected by Vladimir Tismăneanu on the panel of the Presidential Commission for the Study of the Communist Dictatorship in Romania, which presented its Final Report to Parliament on December 18, 2006.

== Biography ==
Zub was born in Vârfu Câmpului, Botoșani County. He attended the School of Pedagogy in Șendriceni, and later completed university studies at the Faculty of History of the University of Iași, graduating in 1957. The same year, he took part in a rally commemorating the medieval Prince of Moldavia Stephen the Great, which was considered nationalist by the Communist regime. Zub was arrested and imprisoned for the following six years, first in Iași, and later at Jilava Prison, Gherla Prison, and near Brăila. At the Salcia forced labor camp from Brăila Swamp labor camps he met Alexandru Paleologu, Ion Dezideriu Sîrbu, and Sergiu Al-George.

After his release, he took up research in the Central University Library of Iași, and began publishing biographies and studies of Romanian culture, which proved to be highly influential during the period of relative liberalization at the start of Nicolae Ceaușescu's regime. He has since notably authored works on major figures of Romanian historiography (including Mihail Kogălniceanu, Vasile Pârvan, Alexandru D. Xenopol), as well as ample studies on cultural phenomena. In 1977-1978, he was the recipient of a grant from the Alexander von Humboldt Foundation.

After the Romanian Revolution of 1989, Zub was awarded full recognition for his contributions to Romanian historiography, and he became a founding member of the Association of Former Political Prisoners. A Directeur d'Études at the École Pratique des Hautes Études in 1993 and 2004, Zub became a Chevalier des Arts et des Lettres in 1995. In 2000, he was decorated Grand Officer of the Order of the Star of Romania.

His activity in 1957, occurring in the aftermath of the Hungarian Revolution, earned him the recognition of the Hungarian government; on October 16, 2006, the 50th commemoration of the rebellion, Zub was presented with the commemorative medal Hero of Liberty.

As part of the controversial criticism he expressed in regard to the Presidential Commission for the Study of the Communist Dictatorship in Romania, the writer Paul Goma, who had been himself a member of the panel, questioned the Commission's ability to deal with the issue. Goma stated: "as for Al. Zub, he has specialized in Xenopol, in Kogălniceanu, in Pârvan - out of which [specialization] he never did emerge, so he has no idea, for instance, about the «happenings» during the Second World War". This attitude notably drew criticism from Bedros Horasangian (who considered Goma's words "banterings" and their effect "void").

In 1991, Alexandru Zub supervised the Ph.D. candidature of Sorin Antohi, a fellow member of the Commission, member of the staff for the Central European University, and Zub's co-author on a 2000 volume published by Polirom. Antohi failed to complete his degree and was expelled from the program; a 2006 investigation proved that he had been misrepresenting his academic credentials, which caused his withdrawal from his academic position at Central European University. Contacted by journalists, Zub refused to comment, and called on the press not to harass Antohi.

In 2007, Zub was involved in a scandal at the Xenopol Institute, after he allegedly had the election of four young history researchers to the Scientific Council of the Institute canceled by Dan Berindei, the head of the History Section of the Romanian Academy and the coordinator of the Institute. The researchers protested against Zub's managership, labeling it "despotic" and asking for his resignation.

== Selected works ==
=== In Romanian ===
- Mihail Kogălniceanu, 1817-1891. Biobibliografie ("Mihail Kogălniceanu, 1817-1891. Bio-bibliography"), Editura Enciclopedică/Editura Militară, Bucharest, 1971
- A. D. Xenopol, 1847-1920. Biobibliografie ("A. D. Xenopol, 1847-1920. Bio-bibliography"), 1973
- Vasile Pîrvan. Efigia cărturarului ("Vasile Pîrvan. The Scholar's Effigy"), Editura Enciclopedică/Editura Militară, Bucharest, 1974; second edition, 2003
- Mihail Kogălniceanu istoric ("Mihail Kogălniceanu as a Historian"), Editura Junimea, Iași, 1974
- Junimea. Implicații istoriografice ("Junimea.Historiographical Implications"), Editura Junimea, Iași, 1976
- A scrie și a face istorie. Istoriografia română postpașoptistă ("Writing and Making History. Romanian Historiography Post-1848"), Editura Junimea, Iași, 1981
- Biruit-au gândul. Note despre istorismul românesc ("The Thought Has Broken Through. Notes on Romanian Historicism"), Editura Junimea, Iași, 1983
- Pe urmele lui Vasile Pîrvan ("On the Footsteps of Vasile Pîrvan"), Editura Sport-Turism, Bucharest, 1983
- Mihail Kogălniceanu, Editura Științifică și Enciclopedică, Bucharest, 1984; second edition, 2004
- De la istoria critică la criticism. Istoriografia română la finele secolului XIX și începutul secolului XX ("From Critical History to Criticism. Romanian Historiography at the End of the 19th Century and the Start of the 20th Century"), Editura Academiei, Bucharest, 1985; second edition, 2000
- Cunoaștere de sine și integrare ("Self-awareness and Integration"), Editura Junimea, Iași, 1986; second edition, 2004
- Istorie și istorici în România interbelică ("History and Historians in Interwar Romania"), Editura Junimea, Iași, 1989; second edition, 2003
- Istorie și finalitate ("History and Finality"), Editura Academiei, Bucharest, 1991; second edition, 2004
- La sfârșit de ciclu. Despre impactul Revoluției franceze ("At the End of a Cycle. On the Impact of the French Revolution"), Institutul European, Iași, 1994
- Eminescu. Glose istorico-culturale (Eminescu. Historical and Cultural Glosses"), Editura Enciclopedică Gheorghe Asachi, Chișinău, 1994
- În orizontul istoriei ("In History's Horizon"), Institutul European, Iași, 1994
- Impasul reîntregirii ("The Deadlock of Reunion"), Editura Timpul, Iași, 1995
- Chemarea istoriei. Un an de răspântie în România postcomunistă ("The Call of History. A Crucial Year in Post-Communist Romania"), Editura Junimea, Iași, 1997
- Discurs istoric și tranziție ("Historical Discourse and Transition"), Institutul European, Iași, 1998
- Orizont închis. Istoriografia română sub dictatură ("Restricted Horizon. Romanian Historiography under Dictatorship"), Institutul European, Iași, 2000
- with Sorin Antohi: Oglinzi retrovizoare. Istorie, memorie si morală în România ("Rearview Mirrors. History, Memory, and Morals in Romania"), Polirom, Iași, 2000
- Istoriografia română la vârsta sintezei: A. D. Xenopol ("Romanian Historiography at the Age of Synthesis: A. D. Xenopol"), Institutul European, Iași, 2004
- Mihail Kogălniceanu, architect al României moderne ("Mihail Kogălniceanu, the Architect of Modern Romania"), Institutul European, Iași, 2005
- Clio sub semnul interogației. Idei, sugestii, figuri ("Clio under the Question Mark. Ideas, Suggestions, Figures"), Polirom, Iași, 2005
- Romanogermanica. Secvențe istorico-culturale ("Romanogermanica. Cultural-Historical Sequences"), Editura Universității Al. I. Cuza, Iași, 2005

=== In French ===
- L'Historiographie roumaine à l'âge de la synthèse: A. D. Xenopol ("Romanian Historiography at the Age of Synthesis: A. D. Xenopol"), Editura Științifică și Enciclopedică, Bucharest, 1983
- Les dilemmes d'un historien: Vasile Pîrvan ("Vasile Pîrvan: the Dilemmas of a Historian"), Editura Științifică și Enciclopedică, 1985

=== In English ===
- Reflections on the Impact of the French Revolution. 1789, de Tocqueville, and the Romanian Culture, The Center for Romanian Studies, Iași/Oxford/Portland, 2000
