= Șerban Rădulescu-Zoner =

Romanian historian and politician

Șerban Rădulescu-Zoner (May 29, 1929, Bucharest – March 14, 2012, Moroeni, Dâmbovița County) was a Romanian historian and politician.

Born in Bucharest, Rădulescu-Zoner was active in the National Liberal Youth from 1945 to 1947. While a student at Cantemir Vodă High School, he participated in the pro-monarchist demonstrations of February 11 and November 8, 1945. During the 1946 election campaign, he put up posters and distributed flyers. In 1948, after the onset of the communist regime, he became a fugitive, hiding for eleven years.

Arrested in 1959, he was sentenced to ten years at hard labor for the political offense of "conspiracy against the social order". He passed through the prisons at Ploiești, Galați, and Jilava, as well as the forced labor camps at Salcia, Stoienești, and Strâmba in the Brăila Swamp labor camps system. He was released by decree in 1962, after which he refused any collaboration with the Securitate secret police. He even declined to sign the customary release paper by which former prisoners promised to work with the authorities, instead throwing it into the official's face and asking to be sent back to prison.

Rădulescu-Zoner held a doctorate from the University of Bucharest. Joining the Nicolae Iorga Institute of History, he was fired in 1975, during the cultural revolution of the Nicolae Ceaușescu regime, and sent to the National Museum of Romanian History. He was restored to the institute in 1990, after the Romanian Revolution, remaining until 1996. Meanwhile, he re-entered politics, serving two terms in the Chamber of Deputies from 1992 to 2000. He first represented the Romanian Democratic Convention and then the National Liberal Party, which he quit near the end of his time in office, refusing to work with “opportunistic” colleagues such as Valeriu Stoica. From 2001 to 2007, he headed the Civic Alliance Foundation.

Politically, lustration of former communist officials was a priority for Rădulescu-Zoner. As a historian, he attempted to understand what happened to Romania and its people after falling into the Soviet sphere of influence. His late work, A fost un destin. Amintiri, marturii, dezvaluiri (2003), a memoir spanning over 500 pages, chronicled his life story. It included fragments of his Securitate file, and lists of those who had denounced, beaten, harassed as well as helped and sheltered him. Other books include: România și Tripla Alianță. 1878–1914 (co-author, 1979); Dunărea, Marea Neagră și Puterile Centrale: 1878–1898 (1982); Bucureștii în anii primului război mondial (co-authored, 1993); Instaurarea totalitarismului comunist în România (co-authored, 1995); and Scrieri politice. 1990–2006 (2007).
