= Matei Boilă =

Romanian politician

Matei Zaharia Boilă (17 April 1926 – 27 August 2015) was a conservative Romanian politician, who later became a Greek Catholic priest. Boilă was influenced by the activity of his great-uncle on his mother's side of the family, Iuliu Maniu, a Prime Minister of Romania. He represented the Christian Democratic National Peasants' Party (CDNPP) in the Senate between 1992 and 2000.

== Biography ==
He was born in Blaj, the son of Zaharia Boilă (a Law professor at King Ferdinand I University) and Clara Pop (the daughter of Maniu's sister, Elena), and graduated from the Gheorghe Lazăr High School in Sibiu. He became a member of the National Peasants' Party (PNȚ) in 1945 and graduated from the University of Cluj's Faculty of Law in 1951. He was arrested by the Securitate in 1949, and again in December 1952, when he was sentenced to 15 months of prison for "conspiracy against the social order". He was sent to the Capul Midia penal colony at the Danube–Black Sea Canal, and in May 1953 he was moved to Jilava Prison. In January 1956 he was again arrested for "public agitation" and sentenced by the Bucharest Tribunal to 10 years in prison, and was incarcerated at prisons at Gherla, Galați, and Botoșani. Freed in July 1964, he passed the bar exam a few months later, and then worked in the oil industry, at a plaster factory, and as a bookkeeper.

In 1965 he married Maria Fărcaș and they had four children. He was ordained a deacon on 1 January 1977 by bishop Iuliu Hirțea, and he was ordained a priest in Reghin on 5 August 1977 by Alexandru Todea, the Greek-Catholic bishop of the Alba Iulia Diocese.

He died in Cluj-Napoca in 2015, at age 89, and was buried in the city's Central Cemetery.

== Activities carried out as Senator ==
From 1992 to 2000 he was senator of Cluj-Napoca from CDNPP. In the parliamentary term 1996–2000, Matei Boilă was a Christian Democratic National Peasants' Party (PNȚCD) member by April 1999 and then, became the non-attached senator. As part of his parliamentary activity in 1996–2000, Boilă was a member of the Friendship Parliamentary Group with Portugal.

Boilă became famous through his legislative initiative no. 243/1996 on the regulation of the use of the worship places of the Romanian Greek Catholic Church. Senator Boilă's project provided the joint use by the Orthodox and Greek-Catholic communities of Greek Catholic churches in localities where there is only one church, or the exclusive use of a church by Greek-Catholic communities in localities where there are two or more worship places. This initiative was completed by Senator Corneliu Turianu and adopted by the Senate on June 12, 1997, which led to an angry feedback from the episcopate of the Romanian Orthodox Church in Transylvania, amplified by National Unity Party (RNUP) lawmakers. The Boilă–Turianu Law was delayed for four years and then, on September 25, 2001, it was rejected by the PDSR that dominated the new parliamentary term (and became the Social Democratic Party (PSD) in June 2001).

== Works ==
- Boilă, Matei (1991). Socialism sau libertate economică (in Romanian). București: Editura Albatros. ISBN 973-24-0219-9. OCLC 30634910.
- Pop, Ionel; Boilă, Zaharia; Boilă, Matei (1998). Amintiri despre Iuliu Maniu (in Romanian). Cluj-Napoca: Editura Dacia. ISBN 973-35-0760-1. OCLC 47071982.
- Boilă, Matei (1999). Din nou în agora: după o jumătate de veac (in Romanian). Cluj: Editura Dacia. ISBN 973-35-0838-1. OCLC 163412309.
