= Concești =

- Commune
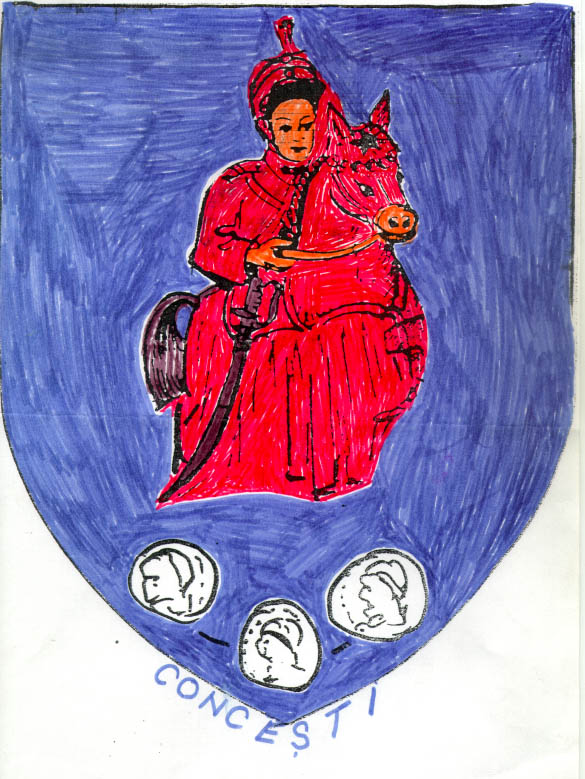
- Coat of arms

- Location in Botoșani County

- Location in Romania
- Coordinates: 48°10′N 26°33′E
- Country: Romania
- County: Botoșani
- Subdivisions: Concești, Movileni

Government
  - Mayor (2024–2028): Maria Ilaș (Ind.)
- Area: 25.96 km^{2} (10.02 sq mi)
- Population (2021-12-01): 1,780
  - Density: 68.6/km^{2} (178/sq mi)
- Time zone: UTC+02:00 (EET)
  - Summer (DST): UTC+03:00 (EEST)
- Postal code: 717055
- Area code: +40 x31
- Vehicle reg.: BT
- Website: primariaconcesti.ro

Concești is a commune in Botoșani County, Western Moldavia, Romania. It is composed of two villages, Concești and Movileni.

At the 2002 census, the commune had 2063 people, of whom 99.9% were ethnic Romanians; 89.6% were Romanian Orthodox and 9.1% Seventh-day Adventist. The main occupation of the inhabitants is agriculture (growing plants like corn, potatoes, and livestock such as cows, sheep, rabbits and fowl, including ducks and chickens). Some of the people of Concești work in the factories in Darabani which provides them with some extra money. A significant portion of the commune's youth went to work abroad in countries like Italy and Spain starting in the 1990s.

An elaborate Late Antique gilded silver amphora found in the area is now in the Hermitage Museum.

== Natives ==
- Florin Pavlovici
