= Nicolae Steinhardt =

Romanian writer, Orthodox monk and lawyer

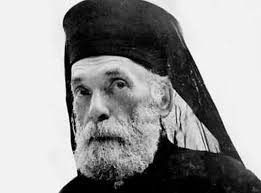
- Nicolae Steinhardt during his time at Rohia Monastery, 1980s
- Born: Nicu-Aurelian Steinhardt; July 29, 1912; Pantelimon, Ilfov, Romania
- Died: March 30, 1989 (aged 76); Baia Mare, Romania
- Occupations: Writer; translator; monk; lawyer

Nicolae Steinhardt (Romanian pronunciation: [nikoˈla.e ˈʃtajnhart]; born Nicu-Aurelian Steinhardt; July 29, 1912 – March 30, 1989) was a Romanian writer, Orthodox monk and lawyer. His main book, Jurnalul Fericirii, is regarded as a major text of 20th-century Romanian literature and a prime example of Eastern European anti-Communist literature.

== Biography ==
=== Early life ===
He was born in Pantelimon commune, near Bucharest, from a Jewish father and a Romanian mother. His father was an engineer, architect and decorated World War I participant (following the Battle of Mărăști). Due to his lineage from his father's side, he was subjected to antisemitic discrimination during the successive fascist governments of World War II Romania.

Between 1919 and 1929, he attended Spiru Haret High School in Bucharest, where, despite his background, he was instructed in religion by a Christian priest. His talent for writing was first noticed when he joined the Sburătorul literary circle.

=== Early career and World War II ===
In 1934, he earned his diploma from the Law and Literature School of the University of Bucharest. Under the pseudonym Antisthius (taken from La Bruyères Caractères), he published his first volume, the parodic novel În genul lui Cioran, Noica, Eliade... ("In the Manner of Cioran, Noica, Eliade..."). In 1936, he earned his PhD in constitutional law, and between 1937 and 1938, he travelled to Switzerland, Austria, France, and the UK.

In 1939, Steinhardt worked as an editor for Revista Fundațiilor Regale (a government-sponsored literary magazine), losing his job between 1940 and 1944, due to antisemitic policies, first under the Iron Guard regime (the National Legionary State), and then the government led by General Ion Antonescu. Despite this, he would forgive Antonescu, and even praise him for allegedly having saved several hundred thousand Jews (which Steinhardt claimed had occurred after a face-to-face debate with Adolf Hitler at Berchtesgaden).

=== Communist persecutions and imprisonment ===
In 1944, after Romania switched sides and joined the Allies, Steinhardt was reinstated at the Revista Fundațiilor Regale, and held his job until 1948, when King Michael I was forced to abdicate by the Communist Party of Romania.

From 1948 until 1959, he experienced a new period of persecution, this time from the Romanian Communist regime, during which non-communist intellectuals were deemed "enemies of the people". In 1959, during the show trial of the fascist collaborator (and Steinhardt's former school colleague) Constantin Noica, he refused to take part as a witness against Noica. As a consequence, he was accused of "crimes of conspiracy against social order", he was included in the "group of mystical-Iron Guardist intellectuals", and sentenced to thirteen years of forced labor, in Gulag-like prisons. He would serve eight years of his 13-year jail term at Jilava, Gherla, Aiud, and other prisons.

While in prison, Steinhardt converted to Orthodox Christianity. He was baptized on March 15, 1960, by fellow convict Mina Dobzeu, a well known Bessarabian hermit. Emanuel Vidrașcu, a former chief of staff and adjutant of Antonescu, served as Steinhardt's godfather. Witnesses to the baptism included the politician Alexandru Paleologu, two Roman Catholic priests, two Greek-Catholic priests and a Protestant priest. He would later state that his baptism had an "ecumenical character". This episode in his life would serve as the basis for his best-known and most celebrated work, Jurnalul Fericirii ("The Happiness Diary").

=== Later years ===
After his release from prison in 1964 (due to the general amnesty of political prisoners) he began a successful career in translation and publishing. His first celebrated literary works, Între viață și cărți ("Between Life and Books"), and Incertitudini literare ("Literary Uncertainties") were published in 1976 and 1980, respectively.

A new chapter in Steinhardt's life began in 1980, after being accepted to enter Rohia Monastery. He worked as the monastery's librarian, while at the same time dedicating himself to writing. During this time, his fame as a counsellor and father-confessor had grown, attracting dozens of visitors to Rohia every week.

He died on March 29, 1989 at the Baia Mare County Hospital. His funeral, under surveillance by the Securitate, was attended by many of his close friends and admirers.

In 2017, Steinhardt was posthumously elected a member of the Romanian Academy.

== The Happiness Diary ==
The first manuscript of Jurnalul Fericirii ("The Happiness Diary") was confiscated by the Securitate in 1972, and restituted in 1975, after an intervention by the Association of Writers (Asociatia Scriitorilor Bucuresti). Meanwhile, Steinhardt had finished writing a second version of the book, which was, in turn, confiscated in 1984 by the State Security Services (Securitate). In the end, Steinhardt had written and edited several different versions, one of which had reached the expat writers and dissidents Monica Lovinescu and Virgil Ierunca in Paris. Lovinescu would later broadcast the book in a series of episodes through Radio Free Europe.

In 2024, Jurnalul Fericirii was published in English as The Journal of Joy by St. Vladimir's Seminary Press.

== Works ==
Due to political reasons, most of his work has been published post-mortem in its uncensored version (after the Romanian Revolution).

- În genul ... tinerilor (In the Manner of... Youth) – published 1934;
- Între viață și cărți (Between Life and Books) – published 1976;
- Incertitudini literare (Literary Uncertainties) – published 1980;
- Geo Bogza - Un poet al Efectelor, Exaltării, Grandiosului, Solemnității, Exuberanței și Patetismului (Geo Bogza – A Poet of Effects, Exaltations, Grandiosity, Solemnity, Exuberance and Pathetism) – published 1982;
- Critică la persoana întâi (First-Person Critique) – published 1983;
- Escale în timp și spațiu (Stop-over in Time and Space) – published 1987;
- Prin alții spre sine (Through Others Towards Self) – published 1988;

=== Post-mortem ===
- Jurnalul fericirii (Happiness Diary) – published 1991;
- Monologul polifonic (The Polyphonic Monologue) – published 1991;
- Dăruind vei dobândi (Giving You Will Receive) – published 1992;
- Primejdia mărturisirii (The Danger of Confessing) – published 1993;
- Drumul către iubire (The Road to Love) – published 1999;
- Taina împărtășirii (The Miracle of Communion);
- Călătoria unui fiu risipitor (Travel of a Prodigal Son);
- Drumul către isihie (The Path Toward Hesychia);
- Ispita lecturii (The Temptation of Reading);
- N. Steinhardt răspunde la 365 de întrebări adresate de Zaharia Sângeorzan (N. Steinhardt Answers 365 Questions Posed by Zaharia Sângiorzan);
- Între lumi (Between Worlds);
- Dumnezeu în care spui că nu crezi... (Scrisori către Virgil Ierunca) (The God in Whom You Say You Don't Believe... Letters To Virgin Ierunca);
- Eu însumi și alți cîțiva (Myself And a Few Others);
- Eseu romanțat asupra unei neizbînzi (Romanticized Essay About a Failure);
- Timpul Smochinelor (Time of Figs)
