= Alexandru Paleologu =

Romanian politician, diplomat and writer

Alexandru Paleologu (Romanian pronunciation: [alekˈsandru pale.oˈloɡu]; March 14, 1919 – September 2, 2005) was a Romanian essayist, literary critic, diplomat, and politician. He is the father of historian Theodor Paleologu.

== Biography ==
Paleologu was born in Bucharest, into an ancient Romanian boyar family that claimed descent from the Palaiologoi, the last ruling dynasty of the Byzantine Empire. His ancestors had moved from Lesbos Island to the Danubian Principalities at the beginning of the 18th century. Paleologu was also, through various marriages, a descendant of the Wallachian Prince Constantin Brâncoveanu. Alexandru Paleologu's father, Mihail Paleologu, was a lawyer and National Liberal Member of Parliament, later general secretary in the Ministries of Justice and of Finance, who was known for his association with Grigore Iunian, while his mother was Elena Pennescu-Vidrașcu.

He graduated from the Spiru Haret High School in Bucharest and then he studied law at the University of Bucharest. In 1944, after the Royal Coup that overthrew Ion Antonescu's dictatorship and took Romania out of the Axis, Paleologu took part in the Romanian committee of the armistice with the Allies and, between 1946 and 1948, worked for the Romanian Royal Ministry of External Affairs. After the Communists regime was established, he was under surveillance by the Securitate, and he lived hidden and under a false name in Câmpulung until 1956, when he began working as a researcher at the Romanian Academy in the Institute of Ancient Art History.

In 1959, Paleologu was arrested and sentenced to 14 years of forced labour. In prison, he met many other important people in Romanian culture such as Constantin Noica and Alexandru Ivasiuc. At the penal colony Salcia from Brăila Swamp labor camps he met Ion Dezideriu Sîrbu, Alexandru Zub, and Sergiu Al-George. He was freed in 1964, and he worked at the same Institute in the Theatre section. He was the literary secretary of the Constantin Nottara Theatre of Bucharest and, in 1967, he became a member of the Romanian Writers' Union. Between 1970 and 1976 he was a writer for the Cartea Românească publishing house.

After the Romanian Revolution of 1989, he was named ambassador of Romania to France (starting February 1, 1990), but he was replaced in June 1990 because he was a sympathiser of the Golaniad movement of University Square (he was the self-styled "ambassador of the hooligans" - ambasadorul golanilor), as well due to his pro-monarchist views.

He later became a member of the Civic Alliance Party, founded by Nicolae Manolescu and he was elected a senator for Argeș during the 1992 election. He was a National Liberal senator for Vrancea (on Romanian Democratic Convention lists) following the 1996 election, and reelected for Bucharest during the 2000 suffrage (serving until 2004).

In the years after 1989 he admitted in a book of interviews with historian and novelist Stelian Tănase that during the communist period he eventually ended up collaborating with the Securitate and asked Romanians to forgive him. He died aged 86, at his house at 34 Armenească Street in Bucharest, and was buried in the city's Bellu Cemetery.

== Works ==
- Spiritul și litera. Eseuri critice, Editura Eminescu, 1970
- Bunul-simț ca paradox. Eseuri, Cartea Românească, București, 1972
- Simțul practic. Eseuri și polemici, Cartea Românească, București, 1974
- Treptele lumii sau calea către sine a lui Mihail Sadoveanu, 1978
- Ipoteze de lucru. Studii și eseuri literare, 1980
- Alchimia existenței. Eseuri și portrete, 1983. Second edition revised, 1997
- Souvenirs merveilleux d'un ambassadeur des golans (Minunatele amintiri ale unui ambasador al golanilor), Éditions Balland, 1992; Editura Humanitas, 1993
- Sfidarea memoriei, 1995 (a dialogue with Stelian Tănase)
- Despre lucruri cu adevărat importante, 1997. Second edition 1998
- Interlocuțiuni, 1997
- Politețea ca armă. Convorbiri și articole mai mult sau mai puțin politice, 2000
- L'Occident est à l'Est, 2001
- Breviar pentru păstrarea clipelor. Convorbiri cu Filip-Lucian Iorga, 2005
