= Bucharest student movement of 1956 =

1956 protests in Romania

The events in Poland which led to the elimination of that country's Stalinist leadership and the rise to power of Władysław Gomułka on 19 October 1956 provoked unrest among university students in Eastern bloc countries. The state of unrest in Communist Poland began to spread into Hungary. As early as 16 October 1956, students from Szeged left the Communist-created students' union (DISZ), re-establishing the MEFESZ (Union of Hungarian University and Academy Students), a democratic organisation that the regime of Mátyás Rákosi had suppressed. Within a few days, students from Pécs, Miskolc, and Sopron had done likewise. On 22 October 1956, students from the Budapest University of Technology and Economics compiled a list of sixteen points containing key national policy demands. When they found out about the intention of the Hungarian Writers' Union to express its solidarity with Poland by placing a crown near the statue of Polish general Józef Bem, a hero of the Hungarian revolution of 1848–49, the students decided to organise a parallel demonstration in support of the Poles. At the protest on the afternoon of 23 October 1956, the students read their proclamation, an act that marked the beginning of the Hungarian Revolution of 1956.

Although no student protests in support of Gomułka took place in Communist Romania, the majority of Romanian students were informed about the situation in Hungary, partly through Radio Free Europe and other Western radio stations. Their interpretation of the events in Hungary was that, under communism, students were the group that had to initiate such protests, and that, once begun, the revolt would be joined by the masses at large.

== Student protests are organised ==
Romanian students closely followed the unfolding events in Hungary, not only in Bucharest, but also Timișoara, Cluj, Târgu Mureș, and Iași. At first, different students would exchange information they had heard on the radio or from other sources and discussed their prospects for undertaking similar actions. The students did not form committees, which the authorities might have considered to be clandestine organisations and attract repression by the state security apparatus. Instead, action groups appeared in the city's different faculties.

Students in each faculty reacted differently. The most active groups were formed in the Faculties of Law, Letters, Theatre, Medicine, Architecture, Journalism, and Philosophy, as well as at the Medical-Military Institute and at the Politehnica. Students' reactions were far more cautious in other technical learning institutes (Petroleum and Gas, Agronomy), in the University of Bucharest's Faculties of Mathematics, Geography and History, and in the Institute of Economic Sciences.

A precise list of students involved in organising protests is difficult to reconstruct. The only sources are transcripts of the trials that followed the movement's crushing, data presented in sessions to unmask rebel students and data regarding the expulsions which followed. From these sources, there emerge the following names of student organisers:

- Faculty of Law: Eugenia Florescu, Dan Mugur Rusiecki, Radu Surdulescu, Florin Caba, Mircea Tatos, Aurel Moldovan, Ligia Filotti, Rodica Ojog, Magda Dumitrescu, Rodica Baroi, Călin Chiser, Ligia Teodorescu, Mihai Cezar Busuioc, Alexandru Dincă, Rodica Bujoreanu, Vladimir Trifu, Marin Stănescu;
- Faculty of Medicine: Alexandru Ivasiuc, Mihail Victor Serdaru, Constantin Iliescu, Dan Constantin Stavarache, Mirel Trifu, Șerban-Horia Popescu, Radu Cernăianu, Remus Petcu, Alexandru Tătaru, Vasile Brânzan, Paul Iliescu, Octavian Lupășteanu, Mircea Selten;
- Faculty of Letters: Teodor Lupaș, Ștefan Negrea, Mihai Rădulescu, Christa Depner, Steliana Pogorilovschi (Stela Covaci), Aurel Covaci, Paul Goma, Horia Florian Popescu, Gloria Barna, Grigore Vereș;
- Institute of Theatre: Alexandru Mălinescu, Petre Gheorghe, Adrian Ianuli, Gabriela Cocora;
- Faculty of Architecture: Alexandru Tătaru, Dan Stoica;
- Faculty of Journalism: Dumitru Panaitescu-Perpessicius;
- Faculty of Philosophy: Mihai Stere Derdena, Dan Onaca, Costel Dumitrescu, Dumitru Arvat, Alexandru Bulai, Ioan Zane, Aurel Lupu, Romulus Resiga, Constantin Dumitru;
- Polytechnic Institute: Marin Petrișor, Horia Șerban Popescu, Marian Rozenzweig, Tiberiu Ionescu, Adrian Cristea, Nicolae Cernăianu;
- Construction Institute: Radu Gabrea;
- Medical-Military Institute: Bebe Brânzan, Paul Iliescu, Remus Petcu.

Many other students were active during those days.

== The first actions ==
Although students admired the Hungarian revolutionaries, they were somewhat reserved as concerns their leader, Imre Nagy. Nagy had lived in the Soviet Union from 1929 to 1944, and, by their own experience, Romanians saw communist leaders brought in and installed by the Red Army to be far worse than home-grown communists.

The students who were watching the situation in Hungary were also attentive to the international situation. Although Western radio stations assured the revolutionaries of the West's support, Romanian students were quite sceptical as they saw the United States' and the Western European powers' passive attitude and abstention from armed intervention.

Despite these doubts, the first protest actions began within days after the Hungarian Revolution started. Similar ferment existed not only in Bucharest, but in other university cities too, particularly in Timișoara, Cluj, and Iași. Although information on what was happening did travel between these cities, coordinating actions would have been impossible in the highly repressive state that Romania was at the time, and students in each city acted independently of one another.

=== The state leadership is invited to a dialogue ===
A first protest began when students from the Faculty of Letters called on Iosif Chișinevschi, then vice president of the Council of Ministers, to reply to a list of questions composed by the students. They chose Chișinevschi as an interlocutor not only due to his government position. Unlike in most communist countries in Eastern Europe, there had been no changes in the leadership of the Romanian Communist Party after Stalin's death. Gheorghe Gheorghiu-Dej continued to lead the country using the same authoritarian methods and he was not influenced by Nikita Khrushchev's 23 February Secret Speech at the 20th Congress of the CPSU, in which Stalin's abuses were denounced and the negative impact of the personality cult was exposed, nor by the reactions of the other communist countries, which purged their Stalinist leadership at least partially. Still, it was known that at the March 1956 Plenum of the Central Committee of the Romanian Workers' Party, Miron Constantinescu and Chișinevschi had opposed Gheorghiu-Dej, arguing for the need of a liberalisation according to Khrushchev's orientation, a proposal categorically rejected by Gheorghiu-Dej. Students interpreted the lack of an armed Soviet intervention in the Hungarian Revolution's first days as Khrushchev's acceptance of the demands of the Hungarian reform movement. Hence, some students considered Chișinevschi, who had backed the notion of liberalisation, however mild, to be a preferable interlocutor to other hardline leaders.

The questions they asked were provocative but did not raise ideological issues. Some of these questions were:

1. If the regimes in the two countries [Romania and the USSR] are identical and communist internationalism exists, why is Bessarabia not being given back [to Romania], since that province is Romanian, from an historical point of view?
2. Why must the peasants make children's coffins from fence-posts when Romania has a substantial production of wood?
3. Why must bread be bought with ration cards in an agricultural country?
4. Why is artificial wine being bought from Bulgaria?
5. Why is there no fish on the market?
6. Why are electricity meters being sold to Vietnam at a price that does not even cover the packaging?
7. Why is methane gas being provided to Hungary only for some factories planned for natural gas processing?

The goal of this action was to gauge whether at least some members of the communist leadership were prepared to begin a dialogue. For this reason, the questions put forward generally had an economic character and did not raise political issues. However, neither artificial Bulgarian wine nor electricity meters for Vietnam represented a major concern for Romanian students. The questions served as a signal to the party leadership that the students wished for a dialogue, not an ideological confrontation.

Neither Chișinevschi nor any other party leader replied to the invitation. But the invitation demonstrated to those who hesitated to join the movement that more energetic actions were needed as a consequence of the authorities' negative attitude.

== Preliminary protest actions ==
In many institutes of higher learning, as well as in some high schools, protests began during courses on politics and Russian language. Faced with hostile students, a number of professors had to leave their classrooms. The faculty received orders to try to calm down the students. For the party leadership, the disturbances that took place during Russian classes were an especially serious matter, as all this occurred in October, a month that had been dedicated to the Romanian-Soviet friendship in honour of the October Revolution.

Students in a number of faculties asked that delegations from the Central Committee be sent to discuss the situation in Hungary with them. The escalation from the first such demand was clear, as the subject had changed from an economic one to a political one. UTM (Uniunea Tineretului Muncitoresc/Union of Working Youth) sessions were boycotted, but students used several sessions convened for the purpose of resolving administrative problems, to discuss openly the Hungarian Revolution and their need to react to it. UTM leaders and students who were party members and objected to these discussions were thrown out of the conference halls. UTM leaders tried to ally themselves with the mainstream student opinion, showing support for the student movement and hostility toward the intransigent positions taken by the party committees within the faculties.

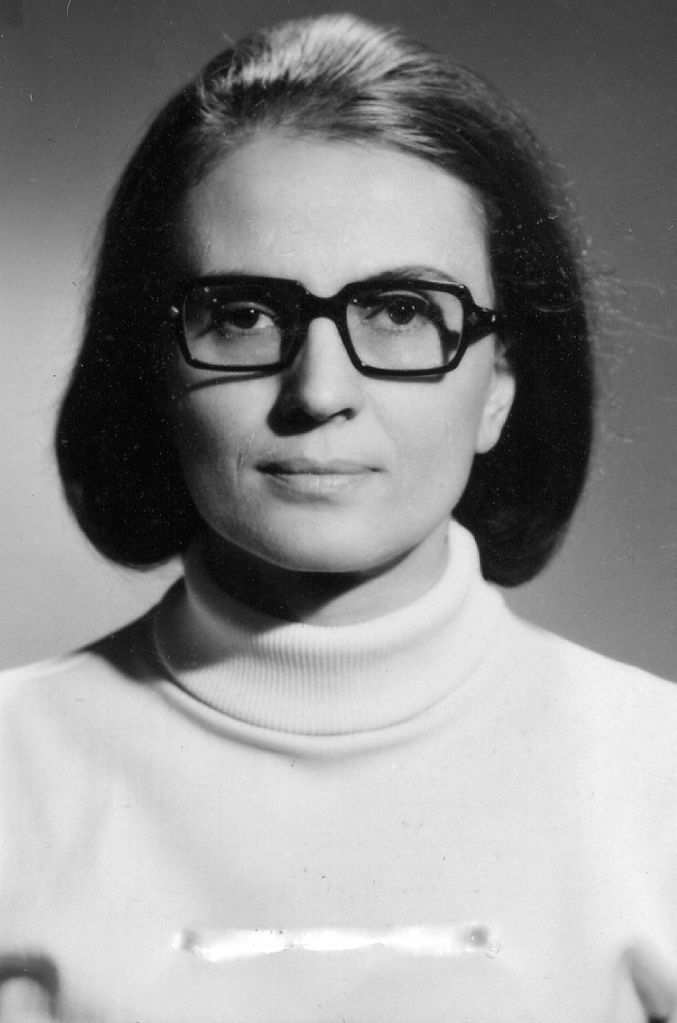
Ligia Filotti, law student, expelled

== The 5 November 1956 protest is organised ==
The first organisational action was prepared by a clandestine group which created links between all the faculties with a view to organise a protest.

On 28 October 1956 a radio station calling itself "Romania of the future. The voice of resistance" began broadcasting on different wavelengths. It is not known where this secret station was broadcasting from; according to one assumption it was located in Yugoslavia. The station, considered a nationalist one, presented the students' demands, including:

- "The return of the stolen provinces, Bessarabia and Bukovina".
- "The expulsion from Romania of Stalinists, who compromised communism and brought fear and hunger to the country."

On 29 October 1956 the Suez Crisis reached dramatic proportions with Israel's invasion of Egypt; this disoriented those students who wanted action. For some more perceptive students, this was a clear signal that the West did not intend to intervene and that the Hungarian revolutionaries, as well as those in Romania, should not count on external assistance. Those more prudent among them considered that without such assistance, their chances of success were minimal. Others expressed contrary views, pointing out that Soviet troops had not intervened and that the Hungarian Revolution was a success, since the communist regime there had practically been overthrown.

As a result of an attempt to organise a student revolt in Timișoara, over 3,000 students had been arrested on 30–31 October. (One of those arrested was Peter Freund, who claimed to have narrowly escaped execution by firing squad; he would later become professor of theoretical physics at the University of Chicago.) The Bucharest student leaders did not have precise information about what had happened in Timișoara, but through various indirect channels they had learned that the situation was very serious.

Support for a student protest had begun to diminish. Aware that if a protest were to take place, it could no longer be delayed, on 2 November 1956 the action committee, led by Alexandru Ivasiuc and Mihai Victor Serdaru, decided to organise a public student gathering. Since the day of 3 November was too soon to ensure sufficient mobilisation, the gathering was scheduled for 5 November in University Square. The organising committee decided that violence had to be avoided during the protest, and so did any response to provocations. Students from the Faculties of Letters and Law wrote a series of manifestoes in which they presented their demands and urged the rest of the population to side with them. What they asked for was that firm opposition be shown toward the Communist Party's abuses, that a precedent be created for the exercising of democratic rights, including the right to assemble, and that the authorities begin negotiations. The manifestoes also contained slogans such as "No more Russian and Marxism courses", "We demand science, not politics, in universities" or "Follow the example of the Hungarian, Czech and Polish students". The distribution of these manifestoes was stopped when the first arrests took place.

On 4 November, the Soviet Army unexpectedly occupied Budapest and other vital centres of Hungary. Although the brutal intervention in Hungary was proof that the student protests in Romania had few chances of success, the organisers believed that the movement had to continue and that the protest had to take place. At the same time, some students were arrested in Bucharest, including a few of the initiators of the protest.

On the night of 4/5 November, troops from the Ministry of the Interior occupied University Square. Traffic was completely stopped, and the entire area normally used by vehicles in front of the university was filled with lorries in which soldiers, armed with automatic weapons, were sitting on benches, ready to intervene. The protest had become absolutely impossible to carry out. Additional armed troops were massed inside the university building and in other nearby buildings. All those who had intended to protest saw what was happening as soon as they entered the square and kept moving. Yet, they were unaware that at the entrances to the square there were party members from the various faculties who were taking down the names of all who walked in that area.

== Repression ==
Steliana Pogorilovschi, student at the Faculty of Journalism, sentenced to 2 years' imprisonment

Given the repression of the Hungarian Revolution by the Red Army, organising another protest in Bucharest was out of the question. In the universities, acts of dissent ceased. Students from the Faculty of Philosophy did try to organise a new protest on 15 November, but the organisers were arrested before they could go further with their plan.

On 27 October 1956, the Political Bureau of the Central Committee of the Romanian Workers' Party, meeting in a crisis session, had set up a crisis command under the leadership of Emil Bodnăraș, whose subordinates were Nicolae Ceaușescu, Alexandru Drăghici, and Leontin Sălăjan. The command had extensive powers, including the right to order troops to open fire and to declare a state of emergency in any part of the country. The command had the explicit right to suspend classes in institutes of higher learning.

The party organs immediately began repressive actions. A whole series of arrests followed, with arrest warrants issued by another special party committee, headed by Gheorghe Apostol. Investigations were intense; the chief interrogator was Captain Gheorghe Enoiu of the Direction of Penal Investigations of the Ministry of Internal Affairs. He was aided by, among others, Lieutenant Major Vasile Dumitrescu, Lieutenant Gheorghe Blidaru, Lieutenant Horia Brestoiu, Lieutenant Nicolae Domnița, Lieutenant Major Florea Gheorghiu, Lieutenant Major Gheorghe Mihăilescu, Lieutenant Major Iosif Moldovan, and Lieutenant Major Dumitru Preda.

The majority of arrests took place in November–December 1956, but arrests continued throughout 1957. Some students were sentenced to 1–4 years in prison; some died in prison. For instance, Ștefan Negrea, a student at the Faculty of Letters, died at Gherla Prison on 3 November 1958.

At the same time, the universities and other places associated with students were placed under strict surveillance. At the order of the Ministry of Education, actions against students were taken by university administrators: students who were suspected of having approved the movement were expelled and a strict system of surveillance was put in place to monitor the behaviour of students. Additionally, student organisations (UTM as well as the Union of Student Associations/Uniunea Asociaţiilor Studenţeşti) organised sessions to unmask "enemy elements". At these sessions, not only were students removed from these organisations, but it was asked that they be expelled – a request immediately granted by the university administration. Those expelled had no right to re-enroll in any institution of higher learning. Sessions were organised at which students were obliged to express their indignation against those who "splatter with mud" Romania's studious youth. Furthermore, the principal protest organisers were unmasked in public sessions during which their expulsion was requested in view of their status as people enemy to the regime. These actions were coordinated by university party organisations as well as by Marxism-Leninism departments. (One especially zealous persecutor during this period was Constantin Bulai, who taught Marxism.) Students convinced professors and artists to sign petitions asking that those arrested be freed; as a result, repressive actions intensified and more were condemned and expelled.

Aside from the immediate measures taken against those students who headed the protest movement, a series of other organisational repressive measures took place in the political realm. On 13 November, in a session of the Political Bureau, it was decided that the Ministry of Education should draw up "a concrete programme of measures to lead to an improvement in the social composition of students". The first to be targeted were former political detainees who had been allowed to return to the universities in 1955–56. Although the great majority of them had not been involved in the protest movement, Nicolae Ceauşescu explicitly asked for this step to be taken in a speech held in Bucharest on 15 November 1956. Around the same time, Virgil Trofin, secretary of the Central Committee of UTM, declared, "We have to know how many enemies there are in our country and are trying to fight against our party".

Concurrently, the student organisations were reorganised. Ion Iliescu, who had recently become a member of the UTM Central Committee, was also named president of the Union of Student Associations of the Romanian People's Republic in order to ensure more stringent control by the party over students.

In an address to the Moscow Komsomol on 8 November 1956, Nikita Khrushchev alluded to the student protests, saying that there were some unhealthy moods among students in one of the educational establishments in Romania. He also congratulated the Romanian Communist Party on having dealt with those protests quickly and effectively.

== Conclusion ==
Little has been written about the Bucharest student movement of 1956. The students' actions and the repression that followed have not been seriously analysed. UDMR deputy Dezső-Kálmán Becsek-Garda did make a statement about the subject in the Chamber of Deputies on 19 October 1999; a few newspaper reports and a short television programme followed. The movement was generally forgotten, at least until the December 2006 publication of the Final Report of the Presidential Commission for the Study of the Communist Dictatorship in Romania, which devotes a chapter to the events of 1956.

Few of the participants at the centre of the 1956 movement have published memoirs of the events, though Mihai Stere Derdena did write an article in 2002. In 2006, Stela Covaci published a book documenting the communist repression of 1956–58 and the methods used to crush a protest movement run by students and anti-communist writers.

The Presidential Commission report states that the autumn 1956 student movement was unique in its ability to organise a protest movement with a well-defined programme, with demands covering the entirety of Romanian society. The report concludes that the protest failed due to the lack of a single coordination centre, the lack of support from other societal groups, and the authorities' actions to stop any protest movement.

These findings have drawn criticism. There was in fact a coordination centre in Bucharest, though it was not structured so as to make it less vulnerable to the machinations of repressive state organs.

== Bibliography ==
- Johanna Granville, If Hope is Sin, Then We Are All Guilty: Romanian Students' Reactions to the Hungarian Revolution and Soviet Intervention, 1956–1958 Carl Beck Paper, no. 1905 (April 2008): 1–78.
- (in Romanian) Final Report of the Presidential Commission for the Study of the Communist Dictatorship in Romania, Bucharest, 2006.
- (in Romanian) "Procesul Comunismului (II)", Ziua, 26 October 2005.
- (in Romanian) Parliamentary debate, 19 October 1999.
- (in Romanian) "Loturile studenților arestați și condamnați în urma evenimentelor din 1956", Adevărul, 12 January 2007.
- "The Doctor's Story", Time, March 25, 1957
- (in Romanian) Covaci, Stela. Persecuția – Mișcarea studențească anticomunistă – București, Iaşi (1956–1958), Editura Vremea, 2006.
- (in Romanian) Derdena, Mihai Stere. "O jumătate de veac de rezistență", Memoria, Nr. 38, 2002.
- (in Romanian) Mihalcea, Al. Jurnal de ocnă, Editura Albatros, 1994 ISBN 973-24-0343-8
- (in Romanian) Popescu, Alexandru. "Lumea rezistenţei anticomuniste românești", Magazin Istoric, Nr. 5, 1997.
