= Sergiu Băhăian =

Romanian businessman

- Other names: Vasile Negrila
- Occupation: Businessman

Sergiu Băhăian is a Romanian businessman, convicted fraudster, and Romanian prosecutors allege, the leader of a criminal organization responsible for the killing of at least four people.

== Background ==
Băhăian became notable in the 1990s when he scammed over 5,000 people with bad checks though his company Sabina Product, which is considered one of the biggest financial scandals in Romania during that decade. The damages were over 7 billion lei. In 1995 Băhăian fled to Hungary together with three accomplices, but he was caught, extradited, and sentenced to five years in jail in 1998. He was released in 2002. Afterward, Băhăian was nicknamed "the prince of bad checks". According to Realitatea TV news portal, in 1998 he defrauded a German business partner of 130,000 marks and 4,000 dollars, but was released soon after his arrest. He was investigated again in 2006 for alleged damages of 30 billion lei (400,000 euros), which were created by establishing the company Absolut Uniprix SRL under a fake identity (Constantin Tudorache) and using it to buy seven cars (four Renault Megane, one Renault Clio, and two Volkswagen Polo) and various construction materials.

According to the newspaper Adevărul, in 2009 Băhăian bought the football club Gloria Buzău through a front company that had 200 lei worth of assets. Although he appeared at a few games, Băhăian avoided being officially identified as the owner of the club.

On 16 January 2010, Băhăian was arrested by the Romanian organized-crime police after a car chase through the center of Bucharest. Cornered, Băhăian did not surrender until police opened fire on his car, which had armored windows. One police officer suffered a fractured arm during the arrest. Simultaneously with Băhăian's arrest, four of his collaborators were arrested in Bucharest, Constanța, and Ialomița County, in an operation that involved 60 police officers.

Băhăian was charged with ordering the killing of four people in "mafioso style" between 2006 and 2008, in a case that Romania's chief prosecutor Laura Codruța Kövesi declared to be "unprecedented". According to the prosecution, the victims, all former business associates of Băhăian, were forced to swallow diazepam and alcohol, and were later buried alive or thrown in the Danube–Black Sea Canal or the Danube River. Two of the victims were found in the Cerchezu commune, buried at a depth of 2.5 metres under a layer of rocks and concrete. The Department of Investigation of Organized Crime and Terrorism Offences (DIICOT) suspects that there may be other victims.

According to the prosecution, Băhăian recruited lonely and poor people, created front companies in their names, and then asked them to buy various merchandise and cars with bad checks or promissory notes. Over 40 companies were created for this purpose. The balance sheets of these companies were usually cooked. When these accomplices, who normally received less than 0.1% of the profits, started to make demands, they were eliminated by two of Băhăian's lieutenants, Valentin Șlepac and Adrian Grigoraș. The monetary damages have been estimated to be at least 800,000 euros by Adevărul newspaper, or 2 million euros by the Gândul newspaper and the Mediafax news agency.

At the time of his 2010 arrest, Sergiu Băhăian had 1,600 friends on Facebook.

In April 2013, the High Court of Cassation and Justice rejected his appeal, upholding the sentence to 26 years in prison for murder, organized crime and fraud. The appeals of his two main accomplices, Valentin Șlepac and Adrian Grigoraș were not considered because they had already died in jail; they had been sentenced to life and respectively 22 years. Three more of Băhăian's accomplices, Edward Marian Mărculescu, Dan Liviu Iovan, and George Florian Oprea, also saw their sentences upheld to 13 and a half years, 13 years, and respectively 5 years in prison. In 2020, Băhăian's sentence was set to 30 years; as of 2025, he is incarcerated at Jilava Prison, where he is being treated for terminal cancer.
