= Timișoara student movement of 1956 =

The Timișoara student movement of 1956 were a part of the broader student movement in Romania, known as the Timișoara Movement of 1956 or the Student Revolt of 1956. This movement was one of the earliest expressions of opposition to the communist regime in Romania and occurred in the context of significant political and social changes internationally, including the events in Hungary in 1956.

== Background ==
In 1956, Romania was heavily influenced by the Hungarian Revolution, which aimed to overthrow the communist government. This had a profound impact on the political climate in neighboring countries, including Romania. Many Romanian students were inspired by the Hungarian events, leading to increased expressions of discontent with the Romanian communist regime. In October 30, 1956, at 2:00 PM, students gathered in the "V. Alaci" amphitheater of the Faculty of Mechanical Engineering which became too crowded. In the presence of the authorities, the speeches began somewhat timidly. At 2:30 PM, the students moved to the cafeteria, which filled with those who arrived from both the Polytechnic University, as well as from the faculties of medicine, agriculture, and the University of Timişoara. They voiced their grievances against the economic and social hardship brought about by the Romanian communist regime and their Moscow-based "masters". These students demanded changes such as: abolishing the cult of personality, eliminating excessive taxes and levies on farmers, increasing salaries in line with price increases, immediate withdrawal of Soviet troops from the country, economic contracts with all countries, freedom of the press and speech, removing the Russian language from education, reducing the number of hours of Marxism, scholarships for all students etc. In the presidium of the assembly, there were the rector Rogojan, as well as the Minister of Labor Petre Lupu, the Deputy Minister of Education Drăgulescu, and Ilie Verdeţ, the secretary of the Central Committee of the Romanian Communist Party, who came to Timişoara to pacify the students. However, this did not deter the student movement.

== Repression ==
Following the assembly, students remained in discussion and decided to finalize a memorandum to be sent to the local press. Meanwhile, security forces organized, surrounding the assembly hall with military personnel and soldiers with submachine guns. As students discussed their plans, the military and Securitate took control of the situation. While some students were able to leave for their residences, others were forcibly returned to the assembly hall. This marked the beginning of the repressive measures against the students. Lists with the students were made and the leaders of the revolt were taken by the Securitate, while the others were loaded onto trucks and transported to a nearby location, Becicherecu Mic, a former military camp. In the days that followed, more student protests erupted; the Faculty of Agriculture students gathered in front of their faculty to protest and the Institute of Medicine students barricaded themselves in a dormitory and refused to speak to the authorities, commencing a hunger strike. Military personnel dispatched to the scene, after a burst of gunfire, forced entry, arresting several hundred students and transporting them to the same destination, Becicherecu Mic. leading to arrests and reprisals by the government. Some students were exmatriculated, and many faculty members faced sanctions or removal from the education system. Here, for several days, students underwent interrogations by Securitate officers to identify the ringleaders of the "hostile demonstrations." A group of 23 students was taken to the Securitate, along with those arrested on the evening of October 30.

== Aftermath ==
The first trial proceeded swiftly, with authorities aiming to set an example for those who might contemplate continuing student protests. In the first group, seven students and a university assistant were brought to trial. The students in the first group were tried on November 15–16 under Decree 199/1950 and, according to Article 1, letter c (a crime against state order), they could have received the death penalty. Fortunately for them, in Hungary, on November 4, the revolution was brutally suppressed by the Soviet occupying army. It was deemed that the threat of the revolution escalating in Romania had thus diminished, leading to a change in the legal classification. The youth were accused of public agitation, a crime punishable by up to 10 years in prison. The second group, consisting of 23 students, was tried on December 12–13. A large number of students were expelled, and many teaching staff members were sanctioned or removed from the education system. The following students from Timișoara were arrested and convicted:

- The first group - Caius Eugen Vladimir Mutiu and Aurel Baghiu, Frederich Barth, Popp Gheorghe, Nicolae Balaci, Aurelian Păuna, Ladislau Nagy;
- The second group - Teodor Stanca, Valentin Rusu, Henrich Drobny, Octavian Vulpe, Iulian Stanciu, Gheorghe Păcurariu, Victor Daiciuc, Axente Treba, Ioan Ilca, Dumitru Alexandru Dalban, Mircea Moraru, Cristian Matei, Dezideriu Ernest Lazăr, Ioan Petca, Cormos- Cornel Sălișteanu, Romulus Tasca, Valentin Radu, Victor Boldea, Ilie Haiduc (professor).

Deported:

- Gheorghe Păcurariu
- Iulian Stanciu
- Axente Treba
- Octavian Vulpe
