= Dăeni =

- Commune
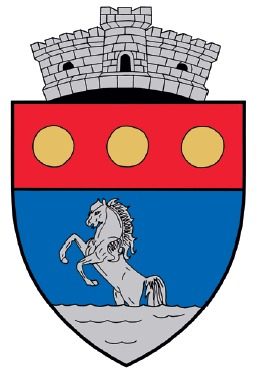
- Coat of arms

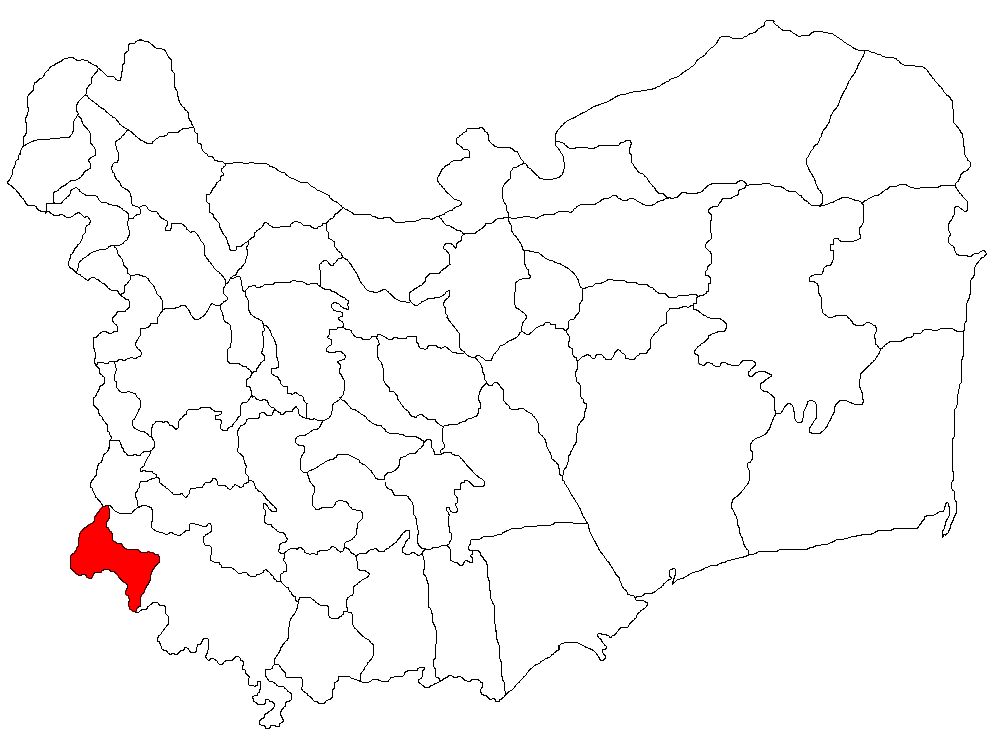
- Location in Tulcea County

- Location in Romania
- Coordinates: 44°50′N 28°07′E
- Country: Romania
- County: Tulcea

Government
  - Mayor (2020–2024): Marian Gherghișan (PNL)
- Area: 42.00 km^{2} (16.22 sq mi)
- Elevation: 24 m (79 ft)
- Population (2021-12-01): 1,772
  - Density: 42/km^{2} (110/sq mi)
- Time zone: EET/EEST (UTC+2/+3)
- Postal code: 827065
- Area code: +40 x40
- Vehicle reg.: TL
- Website: www.comuna-daeni.ro

Dăeni is a commune in Tulcea County, Northern Dobruja, Romania. It is composed of a single village, Dăeni.

The commune is located in the southwestern corner of the county, on the border with the Brăila and Constanța counties, 76 km (47 mi) from the county seat, Tulcea. It lies on the right bank of the Măcin Branch of the Danube.

The Salcia hamlet lies right across the Danube, on the Great Brăila Island. During the 1950s and 1960s, the Romanian Communist regime operated here the Salcia penal colony (part of the Brăila Swamp labor camps).
