= C. A. Rosetti, Tulcea =

C. A. Rosetti
- Commune
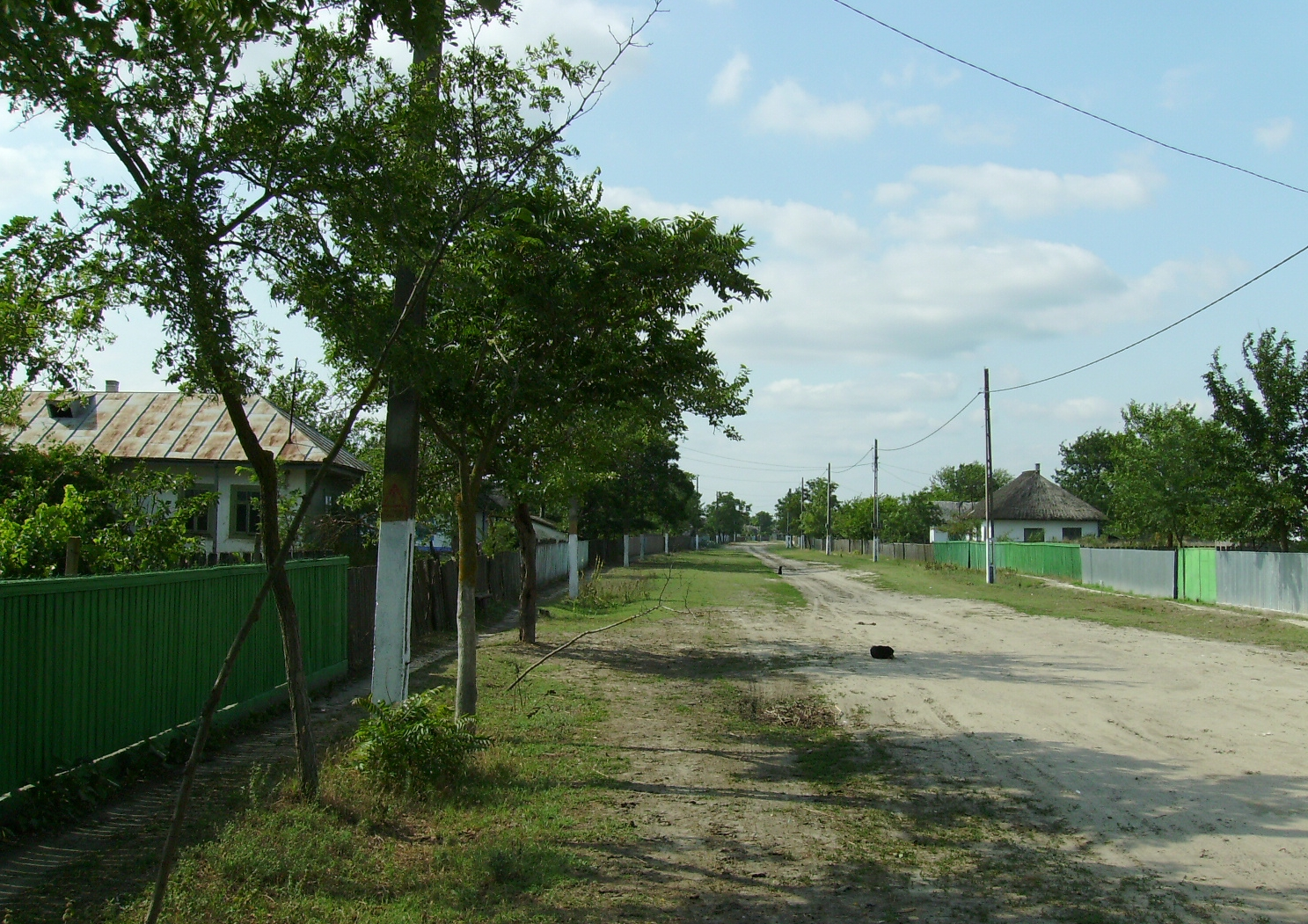
- The main street in Letea village

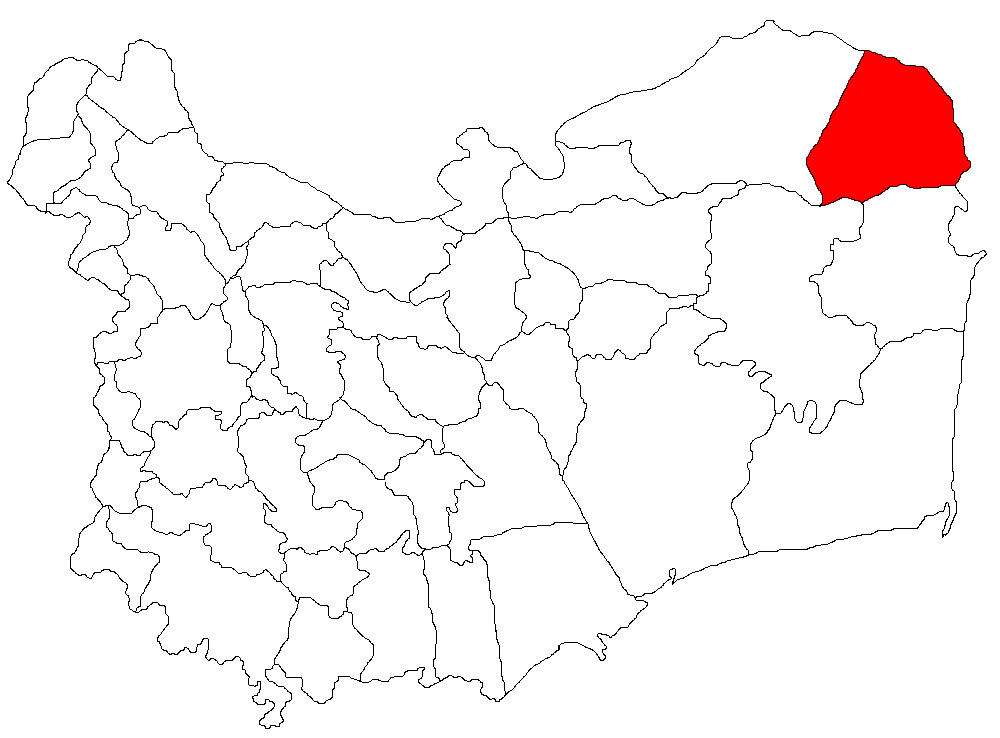
- Location in Tulcea County

- Location in Romania
- Coordinates: 45°18′N 29°34′E
- Country: Romania
- County: Tulcea
- Subdivisions: C. A. Rosetti, Cardon, Letea, Periprava, Sfiștofca

Government
  - Mayor (2020–2024): Antonel Pocora (PSD)
- Area: 276.45 km^{2} (106.74 sq mi)
- Elevation: 2 m (6.6 ft)
- Population (2021-12-01): 636
  - Density: 2.30/km^{2} (5.96/sq mi)
- Time zone: UTC+02:00 (EET)
  - Summer (DST): UTC+03:00 (EEST)
- Postal code: 827015
- Area code: +40 x40
- Vehicle reg.: TL
- Website: primariarosettitl.ro

C. A. Rosetti (Romanian pronunciation: [t͡ʃe a roˈseti]) is a commune in Tulcea County, Northern Dobruja, Romania. The commune is named for writer and politician Constantin Alexandru Rosetti. It is composed of five villages: C. A. Rosetti, Cardon, Letea, Periprava, and Sfiștofca.

The commune lies between the Chilia branch and the Sulina branch of the Danube Delta. It is located in the northeastern part of the county, on the border with Ukraine. A ferry service across the Danube operates from Periprava to Vylkove, a small city in the Izmail Raion of Odesa Oblast.

At the 2011 census, 65.7% of the inhabitants were Romanians, 24.3% Russian Lipovans, and 9.8% Ukrainians. The same census found that Letea (Russian: Летя, Letya) village had 348 inhabitants, down from 404 in 2002. Of the 404 in 2002, 399 were native speakers of Romanian, and 5 of Ukrainian.

The painter Stavru Tarasov (1883–1961) was born in Letea.

The Periprava labor camp operated near the village of Periprava during communist rule.

== Gallery ==
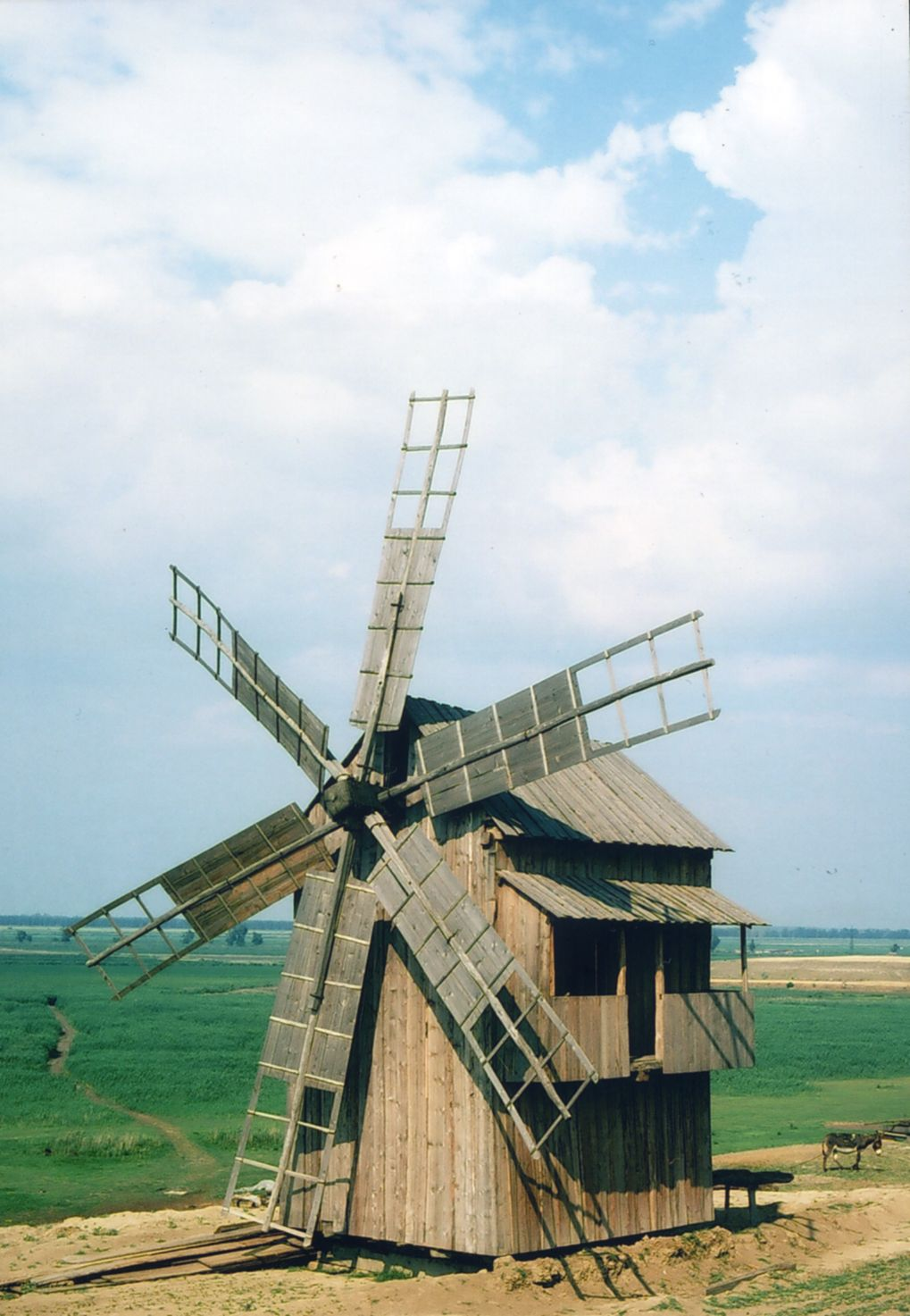
Old mill in Letea

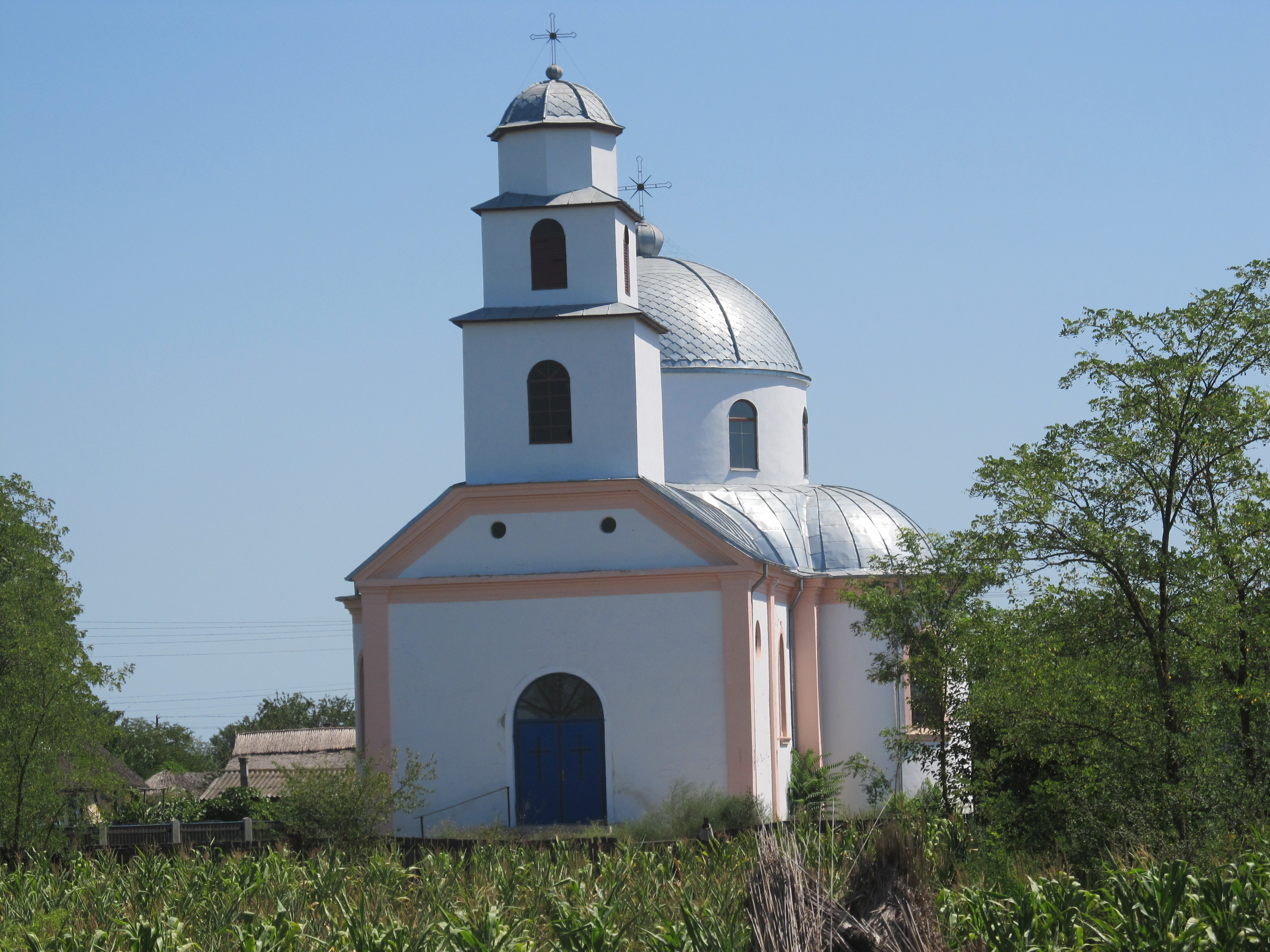
Monastery of the Nativity in Letea

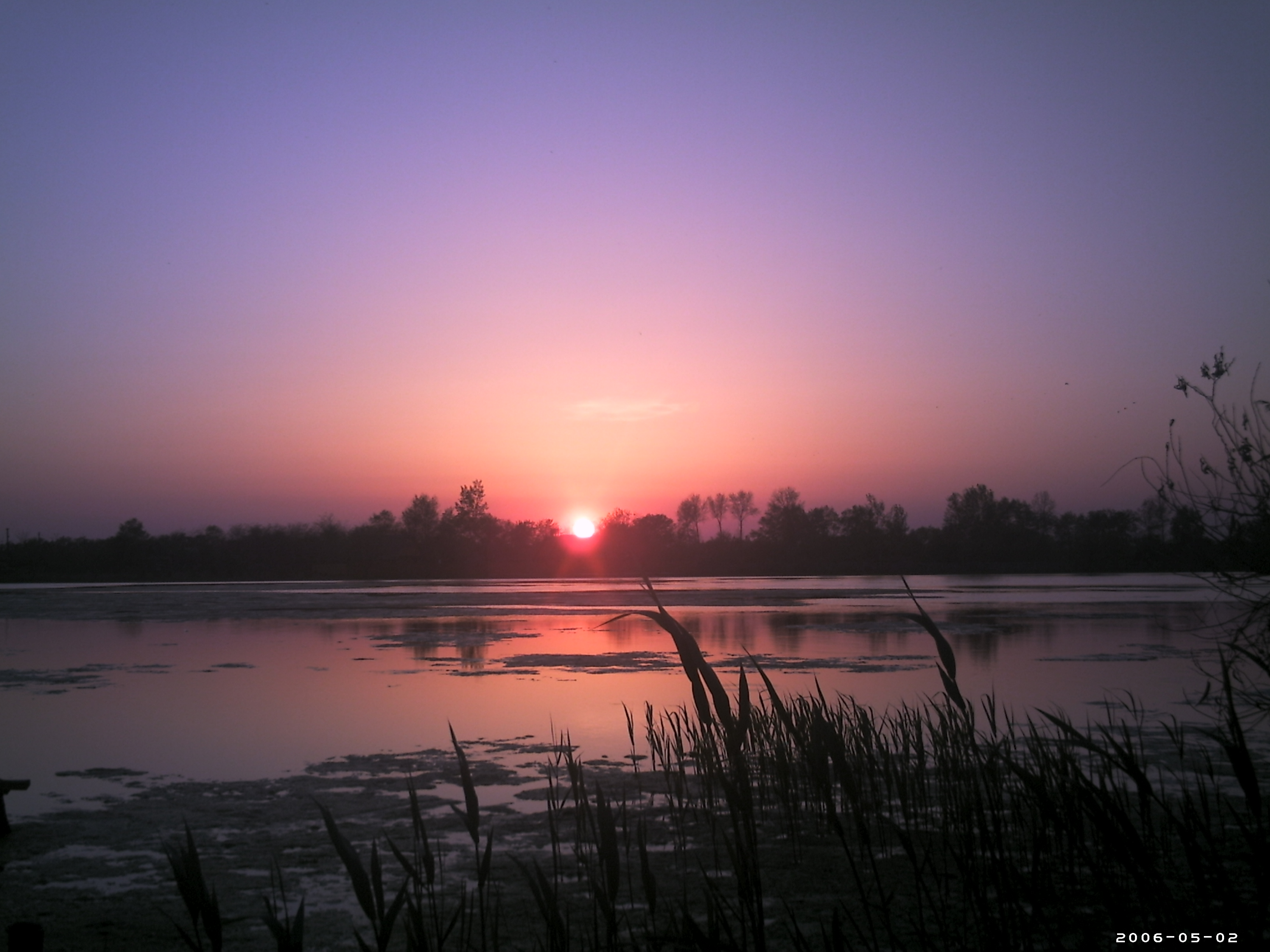
Sunset on Lake Nebunu in Periprava
