= Gherla Prison =

Prison in Gherla, Romania

Gherla
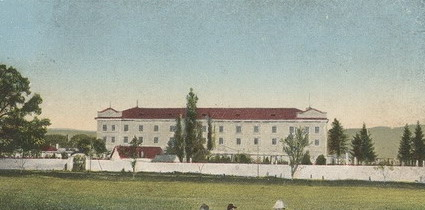
- Gherla Prison, circa 1918
- Interactive map of Gherla
- Location: Gherla, Romania; 47°2′10″N 23°54′31″E
- Status: Operational
- Security class: Maximum
- Population: 4,500 (as of 1959); 924 (as of 2024)
- Opened: 20 October 1785
- Managed by: Administrația Națională a Penitenciarelor
- Director: Subcomisar Răzvan Aldea
- Website: anp.gov.ro/penitenciarul-gherla

Gherla Prison is a penitentiary located in the Romanian city of Gherla (Hungarian: Szamosújvár), in Cluj County. The prison dates from 1785; it is infamous for the treatment of its political inmates, especially during the Communist regime. In Romanian slang, one of the generic words for a prison is "gherlă", after the institution.

== History ==
=== Early years ===
The prison was built on the site of an old fortress from 1540. The Sabbatarian Simon Péchi was arrested in May 1621 by then-Prince Gabriel Bethlen and spent three years in Szamosújvár Prison.

In 1785, Joseph II, Holy Roman Emperor decreed it as the central prison for Transylvania, and it opened in 1787. The military deposit rooms and barns were turned into large detention rooms, seven for men and two for women. Two pillories were built, one in front of the prison and the other in the town center. Following the Revolt of Horea, Cloșca and Crișan, some 10,000 prisoners passed through over the next decade. Inmates had to pay for their own food and clothing or else rely on charity. Discipline consisted of labor, beatings with bats and whips, pillorying and branding. The main building was constructed between 1857 and 1860. It is a U-shaped structure with 36 large rooms. Initially, the ground floor and four rooms on the first floor were reserved for workshops and storage, with the remaining 21 for prisoners. Another building from the same period housed the administration; it had two floors and sat on a bastion from the fortress. From 1898, the warden lived on the upper floor, used for offices under communism. Until 1945, the ground floor included offices for the administration, guard commander and chaplains; subsequently, it contained the office of the prison furniture factory. An exterior security point became a telephone room under communism. Other changes included turning the provisions office and guard commander’s residence near the gate into a meeting hall for cadres; and closing the two churches (Orthodox and Greek-Catholic) on the prison ground floor, making them into a kitchen.

In its first two years (1787-1788), the prison received 151 male and female prisoners. After the 1817 visit of Emperor Francis II, a cloth factory opened, employing all able-bodied prisoners until 1840. There were 384 prisoners in 1855. The following year, the women were sent to Aiud Prison and the men unable to work were sent to other prisons. Thus, the population fell to 250. It peaked at 767 in 1897, of whom 10% were repeat offenders. Some 60-70 prisoners remained in 1913, when it became a correctional institute for minors, amidst a youth crime wave. By 1914, there were 600 minors and 22 teachers who gave lessons on the first six grade subjects as well as sewing, shoemaking, gardening and locksmithing. The teachers and the students aged 18 and older were drafted into World War I, when the building housed wounded troops. After the union of Transylvania with Romania, it continued as a youth prison, housing between 136 and 276 boys and girls. It had an industrial orientation, training tailors, carpenters and gardeners. Frequent epidemics of typhoid, for example in 1914 and 1926, ended up killing 22 children. From 1940, after the Second Vienna Award returned the area to Hungary, it held common criminals; these were freed upon the end of Hungarian rule in 1944.

=== Communist era ===
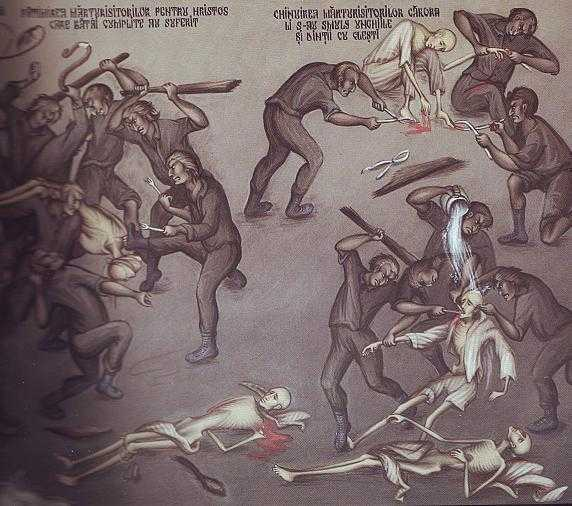
Detail from the Icon of the New Martyrs of the Romanian Land (at Diaconești Monastery in Agăș), showing political detainees being tortured at Gherla Prison

From late summer 1944 until early 1945, the prison was used as a deposit for the Soviet Army. It housed both political prisoners and common criminals from 1945, all men. Between 1945 and 1964, many inmates were peasants and workers, while others came from the middle class: self-employed, intellectuals, pupils and students. Many Romanian military officers who had initially fought against the Soviet Army in World War II were incarcerated at Gherla by the communist regime after the end of the war. Many of the anti-communist resistance figures spent jail time or disappeared forever into this prison. The spacious building soon filled up, with eight to twelve crowded into two-man cells. There were 703 prisoners in late 1948, of whom over 600 were political. By 1950, there were 1600, almost 1200 of them political. The population peaked at 4500 in summer 1959, dropping to 600 by 1964. According to a study done by the International Centre for Studies into Communism, 20.3% of all political prisoners in Communist Romania spent time at Gherla. Food consisted of gruel and sour soups, consumed in a foul air, and packages were forbidden from 1951. Beatings and torture made it among the toughest prisons in the system.

The prison (called by the locals the "Yellow House") was very imposing. To the south was a cemetery, and next to it, a smaller one, for detainees dying at the prison. The fortress was surrounded by a 4-meter high wall, topped by several watchtowers with armed soldiers on guard. Next to the wall was a 3-meter wide space, fenced with a 2-meter high barbed wire fence. At the front entrance was the one-story administration building, and from this building, through a vaulted door, one reached the two courtyards, paved with stones. The main building had two entrances, one to the inner courtyard and the other to the workshop courtyard; the inner courtyard had a gate to the south leading to the workshops.

In June 1950, a group of torturers arrived at Gherla from Pitești, the site of a wide-ranging experiment in “re-education”. Led by Alexandru Popa Țanu, they were joined in December by another group from Târgșor, where the experiment had failed. In August 1951, Eugen Țurcanu, the lead torturer at Pitești, arrived at Gherla. During the preceding fourteen months, Țanu, his adjunct and rival at Pitești, had won the respect of the Gherla administration. As a result, in trying to mark their territory, the two men exacerbated the beatings and tortures, doubling the number of deaths in Room 99, nicknamed the “chamber of death”. The prison doctor falsified the death certificates of those who had succumbed to torture, eventually serving five years in prison.

Room 99, isolated from the other cells, was very spacious; prisoners would sit around the edges, with the torturers guarding the exits. Whoever complained to the guards would immediately be beaten, stripped naked, chained to the solitary confinement cell, constantly having cold water poured on him and left to hunger for days on end. Room 97 had wooden beds, with detainees staying naked underneath. Known as the “madmen’s room”, it involved savage beatings to the point of unconsciousness. Room 97, the “Chinese cell”, involved tying down the victim and subjecting him to a form of Chinese water torture.

By late 1951, “re-education” had failed in several prisons and was fading away in Pitești. That December, Țurcanu and ten associates, believing they were on the way to Aiud in order to continue the process there, were in fact transported to Jilava for interrogation. Two torturers carried on at Gherla until March 1952, either because the Securitate secret police wanted to carry on the experiment under maximum-security conditions, or because they wished to collect evidence for the eventual trial of the Țurcanu group.

With the end of "re-education" came a new warden, the notorious Petrache Goiciu, who quickly turned the prison into a place of hard work and violence. The remaining "re-educators" assumed a position as prominent torturers, who ended up killing Ioan Flueraș. In mid-1952, Goiciu ordered Flueraș to clean the toilets at the local furniture factory. Developing an obsession with the imprisoned politician, Goiciu would start screaming at him whenever he found Flueraș outside his assigned area. In March 1953, the 70-year-old Flueraș was sent to the Interior Ministry Palace in Bucharest. It is unknown what happened to him there; he was brought back in June. One night shortly thereafter, he was moved into a ground-floor cell, where three ex-"re-educators" beat him until morning with their fists, broomsticks, boots and sandbags. Sent to the sickroom, the doctor ignored him and only an assistant wiped and tried to feed Flueraș, who died. The killing had been ordered from the top echelons of the ministry. Gherla was associated with summary, extralegal executions. In August 1949, on orders from Alexandru Nicolschi, seven members of the anti-communist resistance movement were removed from the prison on pretext of being transferred, and shot in an unknown location. In 1950, a convoy of 38 detainees left the prison and its members were shot. From 1958 to 1960, twenty-eight judicial executions were carried out at the prison; 200 prisoners died during the same period.

In 1958, the Hunedoara Securitate concocted a plan for eliminating opponents of collectivization or of the regime. It invented a resistance group called the White Guard. Ioan Nistor, a technician at the Hunedoara Steel Works, was selected as leader. Another 72 people, many of whom were strangers to one another, were arrested. Nistor was tried and executed at Gherla in January 1959. Another eight executions of the fictitious group’s members took place there in 1958–1959. A group of resisters led by Iosif Capotă and Alexandru Dejeu, both National Peasants' Party activists who had emerged as anti-communists during the 1946 election before continuing their activity underground for a number of years, was arrested starting in December 1957. They were tried in mid-1958 and the leaders executed at Gherla in September.

In June 1958 a group of prisoners—consisting mostly of young men who had tried to escape to Yugoslavia, and had either been caught or returned to Romania—rebelled, asking for a more humane treatment. The disturbance was quickly put down by the authorities, and the rebellious inmates were subjected to terrible beatings and torture; twenty-two of them received sentences of five to fifteen years. In an interview with Adevărul, an ex-detainee, Constantin Vlasie, recounts how the guards at Gherla Prison "were evil. They made us eat feces, we slept on the floor, they beat our feet until we fainted." He went on: "They wanted to break up our morale. They had evil methods to make us renounce our faith and worship them instead." Another ex-prisoner, Mihai Stăuceanu (arrested for being a border-jumper), recalls: "The detention regime at Gherla was probably very similar to the extermination regime applied in the Nazi camps: 10 to 12 hours of physical work on a construction site, which was cordoned off with double fences of barbed-wire and with guarding towers, exactly like those to be found at the border." From 1964 to 1989, the prison housed common criminals.

=== Current use ===
The penitentiary is in service today as a "Maximum Security Penitentiary". It also houses a museum, which opened in 1997. As of December 2020, there were 979 detainees at Gherla, of which 242 had retained their right to vote; at the 2020 legislative elections, 191 of those exercised that right.

== Notable inmates ==
This is a partial list of notable inmates of Gherla Prison; the symbol † indicates those who died here.

- Agricola Filip
- Matei Boilă
- Sorin Bottez
- Iosif Capotă †
- Ion Caraion
- Gheorghe Cardaș
- Ion Cârja
- Ștefan Cârjan
- Radu Ciuceanu
- Corneliu Coposu
- Dumitru Coroamă
- Ioan Dragomir
- Ilarion Felea
- Ioan Flueraș †
- Paul Goma
- Iuliu Hirțea
- Dimitrie Iov †
- Gheorghe Jienescu
- Iosif Jumanca †
- Leon Kalustian
- Horia Macellariu
- Nicolae Mărgineanu
- Gheorghe D. Marinescu
- Gheorghe Mosiu
- Constantin Panaitiu
- Gherman Pântea
- Ovidiu Papadima
- Vasile Pascu †
- Florin Pavlovici
- I. Peltz
- Dinu Pillat
- Mihai Rădulescu
- Gheorghe Răscănescu
- Alexander Ratiu
- Sándor Rózsa †
- Alexandru Rusu †
- Ion Dezideriu Sîrbu
- Olimpiu Stavrat
- Nicolae Steinhardt
- Păstorel Teodoreanu
- George Tomaziu
- Eugen Țurcanu
- Ștefana Velisar Teodoreanu
- Mihail Voicu †
- Constantin Voiculescu †
- Vintilă Weiss
- Richard Wurmbrand
- Alexandru Zub
