= Alexandru Dincă (journalist) =

Romanian journalist 1936–1998

Alexandru Dincă (14 November 1936 – 1998) was a Romanian journalist and opponent of the communist regime.

== Biography ==
Dincă was born in Bucharest on 14 November 1936. After graduating high school, he became a student at the Faculty of Law of the University of Bucharest. While in his second year, Dincă actively participated in the Bucharest student movement of 1956, being one of the main organizers of the protest rally scheduled in the University Square on 5 November 1956. He was arrested the next day. His interrogation was carried out by lieutenant-colonel Constantin Popescu, captain Gheorghe Enoiu, first lieutenant Iosif Moldovan, first lieutenant Vasile Dumitrescu, first lieutenant Gheorghe Vasile, first lieutenant Constantin Oprea and second lieutenant Nicolae Urucu. He was tried in the "Mitroi group" of opponents and was convicted on 19 April 1957 and sentenced to six months imprisonment by sentence No. 534 of the Military Tribunal of Bucharest. He was released after having completed his sentence.

Dincă resumed his studies and graduated from the Bucharest Academy of Economic Studies. He worked as an economist at the Bucharest Road Construction Enterprise. After the Romanian Revolution of 1989, he joined the National Liberal Party, being appointed director of the Viitorul newspaper, the official daily newspaper of the party.

He died of a heart attack in 1998.
