= Brăila Swamp labor camps =

Labor camps in Communist Romania

The Brăila Swamp labor camps (Romanian: lăgarele din Balta Brăilei (Note: The Romanian word "baltă" may be translated as "pond", however the Romanian word has a more generic meaning of expanses of stagnating shallow water. In the context of Brăila the proper term would be "swamp" or "wetland", especially keeping in mind that the whole wetland around the chain of islands called "Small Brăila island" (Insula Mică a Brăilei) is called Balta Mică a Brăilei ("Small Brăila Swamp/Wetland))) were a series of labor camps operated by the Romanian communist regime in the 1950s and ‘60s, around the Great Brăila Island.

== History ==
This set of camps was established in order to carry out various agricultural projects of the state. Their main purpose was to build earthen dikes and dry out floodplains in order to facilitate the growing of crops. Using detainees not only allowed for free labor but also for the evacuation from cities of elements viewed as dangerous. “Re-education” through labor was another declared scope. The harsh climate, gargantuan labor, lack of hygiene and mechanical technology rendered these camps extermination facilities. Political prisoners lived and worked at the limit of endurance. Many died and were buried in unmarked graves in the land they were forced to work or in the dikes they built.

=== Ostrov ===
The Ostrov camp was founded in November 1952 and located in Ostrov, on the right bank of the Danube. It was established after work on the dikes began, as a result of the need for extra labor. It housed both common criminals and political detainees. There were 340 of the latter in 1952, progressing as follows: 200 (1953), 140 (1958), 1148 (1959), 3,632 (1960), 2,593 (1961), 1,945 (1962), 1,482 (1963), and 744 (1964). Between 1952 and 1967, 45 escapes took place; seven detainees drowned in 1955. A typhoid epidemic occurred in September 1956. The camp was renowned for its inhumane conditions. This was especially the case under Pavel Ion, warden from 1952 to 1953. During his leadership, prisoners were beaten with iron rods and shovels for no reason.

Other abuses included killing by shooting and burial alive, keeping detainees undressed and forcing them to enter waist-deep water in order to cut reeds in winter, chasing them on horseback and trampling them underfoot, forcing them to work naked and stand in freezing water for hours, binding and exposing them to mosquitoes. Corpses were profaned, eaten by rats, thrown into cells. Under Ion, 63 detainees died of torture. Tried alongside six others, he was sentenced to life imprisonment in 1955 and freed two years later. The name Dăeni often appears in documents, especially from 1950 to 1964. When used as an umbrella term for a camp complex, it appears identical to Ostrov, which gradually replaced it after 1960; when used for a specific camp, Salcia is meant.

=== Periprava ===
The Periprava labor camp was located 3 kilometers from Periprava village, in the Danube Delta. Initially a section of the Chilia camp used for cutting reeds, it became a free-standing unit in July 1957, when 200 prisoners from the parent camp were sent to manage the dikes. They were housed in tents until 1958–1959, when rudimentary barracks were built. They were forced to work on building dikes, cutting reeds (exported to West Germany), digging, building a road, farming livestock and crops. The number of prisoners rose after a wave of arrests by the Securitate secret police in 1958, so that two other sections were established.

The prisoners were both ordinary and political until 1964, although in 1959, nearly all the former were transferred, while nearly 2000 political prisoners were brought in. These included detainees from Aiud, Gherla and Constanța prisons, and Iron Guard internees from around Craiova. In 1957, the camp held 2,040 or over 5,000 prisoners, depending on the source. The remaining 940 were freed in 1964. There were 400 guards; eleven escapes occurred between 1957 and 1964, two of the fugitives being shot dead. Common criminals were brought in after 1964, and the camp was closed in 1974. Warden Ion Ficior (1960–1963) was remembered for his particular cruelty; he would keep detainees at the limit of starvation and order savage beatings for those who ate plants they harvested or missed their quotas. Often, two or three prisoners every night and, once half a dozen bodies had accumulated, would be thrown into mass graves.

=== Salcia ===
Initially a section of Ostrov camp, Salcia penal colony was located in Dăeni, on the left bank of the Danube. Founded in April 1952, the detainees were forced to work in several areas: building a dike that would protect farmland from Danube flooding, crop and livestock farming, reed gathering and, most difficult, building yet another dike; the soil was shoveled out carted away by wheelbarrow, becoming increasingly difficult as they went deeper. The population was composed of both ordinary criminals and political prisoners, held in separate areas. The work quotas were impossible to meet, especially for men who had spent years nearly starving. Failure to meet these was punished by daily beatings; the torture sometimes ended up killing prisoners. In one case, a dead man was placed in solitary confinement; his corpse, partially eaten by rats, was retrieved the following morning. An investigation in 1954 led to prison sentences the following year; those convicted were released after two years.

Subsequently, the abusive methods did not stop: work sometimes lasting 12–14 hours a day, insufficient food, lack of any medical care and violent beatings increased the death rate. The harsh climate, especially in winter, also contributed. In November–December 1959, some 120 detainees died, mostly under 50 and initially healthy. In March 1956, flooding on the Danube threatened the dike, which prisoners protected for two weeks with their own bodies, in snowy, freezing weather. The dike collapsed in places, burying the protectors alive; 35 guards received minor sentences as a result. Once, rather than throw away rotten onions, they were fed to the prisoners, provoking an enterocolitis outbreak that further weakened their health. German Shepherds were used as guard dogs: living in better rooms than the detainees, daily brushed, walked and fed a kilogram of meat, they were trained to knock down and maul prisoners. Guards routinely searched mattresses and prisoners’ body cavities for banned objects. The graves of deceased prisoner remain unknown.

=== Chilia Veche ===
Chilia Veche camp was established in April 1952 and located in Chilia Veche, some 2 kilometers from the Danube. Closed in November 1954 and the detainees sent elsewhere, it reopened in early 1956. This was done in order to provide workers for building dikes, cutting reeds and rushes in the Delta and growing crops. Three subordinate sections were established at Tătaru (1956), Stână (1959) and Paradina (1963): detainees there harvested corn and wheat, cut reeds and rushes and cleared land. By 1959–1960, thousands of detainees were harvesting and sorting reeds. The camp housed both common criminals and political detainees. In late 1958, over 3,000 men were brought to Chilia, swelling the population to almost 4,400; by 1966, there were just over 1,000. Many of them were sick, over age 60, forced to work 10 hours a day in water, mud and cold, collecting 44 piles each, punished and deprived of food for not meeting the quota.

The severity of the regimen peaked in 1956-1959 under the notorious Nicolae Moromete, previously warden of Jilava Prison. An internal investigation found that, aside from his abusive behavior (tacitly approved from higher up), he stole and sold the detainees’ food. Another investigation carried out in August 1959 found that beatings with truncheons, wet ropes and wire-reinforced belts went on for hours on end, causing dozens of detainees to lose control of their bodily functions. On one occasion, their cries reached the local villagers, who whistled and asked the guards to stop. The report noted that many were infirm and over 70; starved by their half-rations, they turned to eating reeds. An unusually high number died. After 1964, the camp held only common criminals.

=== Stoenești ===
The Stoenești camp was subordinate to Salcia and existed by 1954. Among the detainees were soldiers who refused orders during the Bucharest student movement of 1956. By the late 1950s, prisoners included 2,000 students and 1,400 peasants. In late summer 1959, over 500 peasants arrested during collectivization were released. In 1962, prisoners were used to dig dikes along the Danube–Black Sea Canal. Detainees lived in sheep barns afflicted by cold, wind, rain, dirt and mice. Hunger led some to eat snakes, rush bulbs, weeping willow leaves, alfalfa, and corn; many died of dysentery. Cold, hunger, exhausting quotas, daily beatings and a lack of doctors killed several thousand. Guard dogs were trained to attack prisoners.

Guards stole and sold large quantities of food and also used it to feed their families. Sometimes, hungry detainees were forced to ingest 6 kilograms each of bean stew and mămăligă, leading to severe illness or death from intestinal occlusion. In the winter of 1959–1960, with roads blocked by mud and the Danube frozen, food deliveries stopped, leading to days on end without rations; prisoners were still forced to work. Among the more abusive wardens were Iova (1960), arrested for food theft the following year; and Petrescu (1961), who personally whipped detainees as they returned from the workday and beat and chained Adventists, who refused to work on Saturdays.

=== Other camps ===
Vlădeni camp, situated on the Danube plain in Vlădeni, was established in 1958. It comprised four sections of 4,000 to 5,000 prisoners each. They were forced to build a dike to protect floodplains located along the Borcea branch. They worked manually, carting the soil in wheelbarrows; it was eight meters high and twenty meters wide. Later, they worked with crops, livestock and in construction. Officially, Vlădeni housed only common criminals while political prisoners went to Giurgeni, although one former prisoner reports that they were mixed in reality. They were wakened at three in the morning, an hour later marched five to ten kilometers to their worksites, took a one-hour break at noon and left off for the day at five or six in the afternoon.

Established around 1958, the Luciu-Giurgeni camp was located on the Danube plain, next to the collective farm in Giurgeni. Detainees were forced to work with crops and livestock, build dikes, homes for agricultural laborers and the Giurgeni–Vadu Oii Bridge, harvest reeds. In 1960, it housed 550 political prisoners. For the next two years, they were its only residents: Iron Guard members and men convicted of offenses such as propaganda, anti-regime agitation, illegal border crossing, calumny against the social order. Eventually, common criminals were brought in but housed separately. The political prisoners were transferred in 1964. Guarded by dogs trained to attack if they collapsed or tried to rest, the prisoners were fed poorly and wracked by thirst. They had to drink from the Danube and, while working, from puddles in the field. Rats in the holes that served as toilets and in the food stores provoked epidemics of typhoid fever and leptospirosis. Dead prisoners were encrusted in the dike or left to be eaten by rats. One of the most difficult activities was rice harvesting: detainees had to stand bent over in water from six in the morning until six in the afternoon, hoeing. Sergeant Scarlat, a Securitate officer, was notorious for patrolling at the water's edge, armed with a two-meter bat, unhesitatingly beating slower detainees until they fainted. Alexandru Ioanițescu, warden from 1960 to 1962, was involved in stealing and selling prisoners’ food; he also applied savage beatings. The accusations eventually led to his transfer.

The Grădina camp, a section of the Ostrov prison, was located on the left bank of the Danube. Operated between 1952 and 1967, its prisoners were until 1959 housed in adobe and mud houses with rush roofs, offering scant protection against harsh winters. Running water was only installed in 1962, prior to which many epidemics occurred, for which the doctors were unprepared. Many political prisoners passed through between 1960 and 1964, around 2,000 in 1960. They were used for agricultural labor and building a dike, where they had a daily quota of four wheelbarrows that they had to push 50 meters. Those unable to do so were beaten with bats at the camp entrance and usually had to be supported until they reached the barracks. Dumitru Malangeanu, warden from 1953 to 1957, stood out for his cruelty and violence, as did Dumitru Nedelcu (1960–1961), who personally administered savage beatings every evening.

Other camps operated at Băndoiu, Cojocariu, Florica, Gârliciu, Hârșova (Vadul Oii), and Piatra-Frecăței. Additionally, in 1958, floating prisons were established on three ferries (bacuri): the Kastro, Gironde, and Yser. These flew the Greek and French flags, leaving the impression that they were foreign commercial vessels. Their purpose was to hasten the collection of reeds. Other prisoners were sent to the rice fields, where the swampy soil, cold temperatures and water parasites made conditions especially difficult. Each ferry housed two to three thousand prisoners. The summer heat made breathing difficult, while the walls froze in winter, and there was no medical care on site. Drinking water came from the Danube, where the chamber pots were also emptied, leading to frequent hospitalizations.

== Sources ==
- Muraru, Andrei (2008). Dicționarul penitenciarelor din România comunistă: 1945–1967 (in Romanian). Institutul de Investigare a Crimelor Comunismului în România. Iași: Polirom. ISBN 978-973-46-0893-5. OCLC 297531689.
