= Alexandru Dincă (handballer) =

Romanian handball player (1945-2012)

Medal record

Men's handball

Representing Romania

Olympic Games
Bronze medal – third place	1972 Munich	Team

World Championships
Gold medal – first place	1970 France	Team
Gold medal – first place	1974 East Germany	Team
Bronze medal – third place	1967 Sweden	Team

Alexandru Dincă (18 December 1945, Bucharest – 30 April 2012) was a former Romanian handball player who competed in the 1972 Summer Olympics.

In 1972 he won the bronze medal with the Romanian team. He played all six matches as goalkeeper.
