= Jilava Prison =

Prison in Jilava, Romania

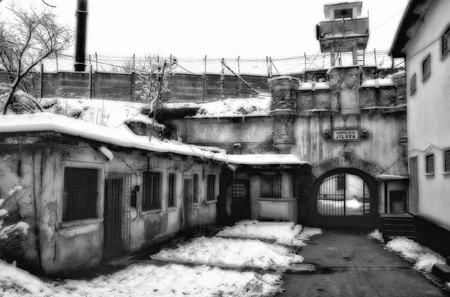
- Interactive map of Jilava Prison
- Location: Jilava, Romania; 44°20′06″N 26°06′27″E
- Status: Operational
- Population: 1,049 (December 2023)
- Opened: 1907
- Managed by: Administrația Națională a Penitenciarelor
- Director: Cristina Antoanela Teoroc
- Website: anp.gov.ro/penitenciarul-bucuresti-jilava/

Jilava Prison (Romanian: Penitenciarul București–Jilava) is a prison located in Jilava, a village south of Bucharest, Romania.

== History ==
The prison began as Fort 13, part of the fortifications of Bucharest built in the 1870s and 1880s. It served as an arms deposit and garrison until 1907, when people arrested during the peasants' revolt were brought there. It then served as a military prison until 1948. It held soldiers charged with insubordination and civilians accused of military offenses. During World War I, it first held soldiers who refused mobilization and then, after occupation by the Central Powers, Romanian prisoners of war. Members of the fledgling Romanian Communist Party were taken there in 1921 and after it was outlawed in 1924. During the Grivița strike of 1933, several communists were sent to Jilava, including Gheorghe Gheorghiu-Dej, Chivu Stoica, Alexandru Drăghici, and Gheorghe Vasilichi. On the night of November 25/26, 1940, the Jilava massacre was carried out by members of the Iron Guard, who killed 64 officials who had served under King Carol II. Part of the Guard members arrested in January 1941 during the Legionnaires' rebellion were sent to Jilava. In May 1946, the accused war criminals tried by the Romanian People's Tribunals were incarcerated at Jilava, including Ion Antonescu, Mihai Antonescu, Constantin Pantazi, Eugen Cristescu, and Radu Lecca. Both Antonescus were executed there on June 1, along with Gheorghe Alexianu and Constantin Vasiliu.

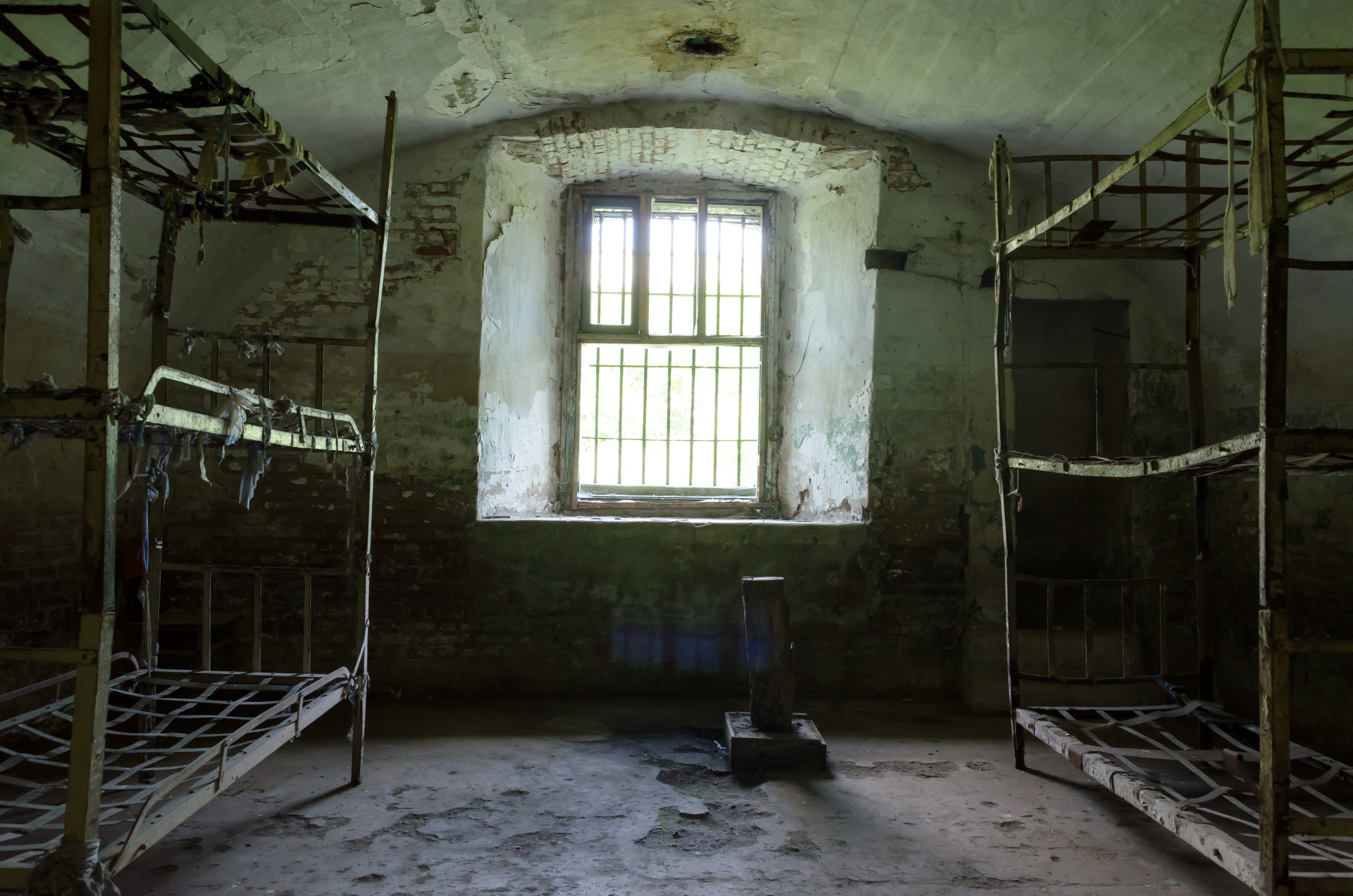
Cell at the abandoned Fort 13 Jilava

Between 1948 and 1964, under the Communist regime, the prison was one of transit and triage for "counter-revolutionaries": members of banned political parties, Guardists, spies, accused war criminals and members of anti-Communist organizations. It had a small women's section isolated from the rest. The detainees were held for several months awaiting trial and transfer to other prisons or labor camps, or were brought from other prisons for interrogation by the Securitate secret police. Arriving detainees had to run a gauntlet of guards armed with bats and other weapons; after being beaten on the head and elsewhere, their clothes were inspected while they sat naked on the cement floor. They were then thoroughly inspected for contraband in every bodily orifice. Once in the cells, new prisoners would sleep on the floor, rising to the first and then the second bunk as spaces opened up. One bucket contained water for washing while another was a chamber-pot; the cells reeked of feces and urine. After two detainees escaped in 1951, the windows were sealed. Three prisoners died of asphyxiation in the first month, while the rest were covered in sores. Prisoners were not allowed visitors, packages or letters. Given its transit role, Jilava served as a place where news was exchanged; new arrestees were especially prized, as they would bring news from the outside world.

Holding an average of 3,000 prisoners, Jilava saw them beaten, tortured, starved and denied adequate medical care. The most brutal conditions prevailed under Nicolae Moromete, the warden between 1949 and 1952. During one episode in December 1950, after informants reported that detainees were holding discussions about the political situation and the possibility of being liberated by the United States, he went from cell to cell, removing those pinpointed as the ringleaders. Six guards beat each man mercilessly before covering his head with a bag, stepping on him and beating him with truncheons and revolvers. Returned to his cell wrapped in a blanket, the victim often suffered from split eardrums and broken ribs, while blood flowed from his mouth and nose. According to prisoner accounts, most guards were Roma recruited from surrounding villages.

After 1967, the prison housed common, recidivist criminals under a harsh regime. From the 1970s, they were moved into a new building. Protesters arrested during the Romanian Revolution of 1989 were thrown into the old fort, which was used for storage after 1990, meanwhile decaying.

== Notable inmates ==
This is a partial list of notable inmates of Jilava Prison; the symbol † indicates those who died there.

- Gheorghe Alexianu †
- Ștefan Andrei
- Constantin Anghelache
- Ion Antonescu †
- Mihai Antonescu †
- Gheorghe Argeșanu †
- Toma Arnăuțoiu †
- Gheorghe Arsenescu †
- Sergiu Băhăian
- Radu Băldescu †
- Ioan Bengliu †
- Mișu Benvenisti
- Ernest Bernea
- Aristide Blank
- Arsenie Boca
- Matei Boilă
- Sorin Bottez
- Mihail Gheorghiu Bujor
- Victor Cădere
- Alexandru Cantacuzino
- George Matei Cantacuzino
- Ion Caraion
- Gheorghe Cardaș
- Ștefan Cârjan
- Dumitru Carlaonț
- Nicolae Ceaușescu
- Radu Cioculescu
- Radu Ciuceanu
- Nicolae Ciupercă
- Gheorghe Clime
- Corneliu Zelea Codreanu
- Alecu Constantinescu
- Corneliu Coposu
- Dumitru Coroamă
- Ovidiu Cotruș
- Eugen Cristescu
- Nicolae Dăscălescu
- Constantin David
- Ilariu Dobridor
- Constantin Doncea
- Alexandru Drăghici
- Ioan Dumitrache
- Constantin Ticu Dumitrescu
- Anton Durcovici
- Gheorghe Eminescu
- Ion Ficior †
- Leonte Filipescu
- Radu Filipescu
- Ștefan Foriș
- Dimitrie Gerota
- Gheorghe Gheorghiu-Dej
- Vladimir Ghika †
- Toma Ghițulescu
- Nicolae Giosan †
- Paul Goma
- Radu Gyr
- Emil Hațieganu
- Traian Herseni
- Iuliu Hirțea
- Iuliu Hossu
- Iosif Iacobici
- Victor Iamandi †
- Ion Ioanid
- George Ivașcu
- Leon Kalustian
- Remus Koffler †
- Radu Korne
- Radu Lecca
- Gheorghe N. Leon
- Vasile Luca
- Horia Macellariu
- Nicolae Macici
- Ernest Maftei
- Mihail Manoilescu
- Gheorghe Manoliu
- Șmil Marcovici
- Nicolae Mărgineanu
- Gabriel Marinescu †
- Ion C. Marinescu
- Radu Mazăre
- Istrate Micescu
- Gheorghe Mihail
- Alexandru Mironescu
- Radu Mironovici
- Alexandru Moghioroș
- Mihail Moruzov †
- Ghiță Moscu
- Marian Munteanu
- Ion Negoițescu
- Ion Negulescu †
- Alexandru Nicolau
- Constantin Nicolescu
- Paul Niculescu-Mizil
- Constantin Noica
- Duško Novaković
- Constantin Oprișan †
- Kiva Ornstein †
- Zenovie Pâclișanu
- Francisc Panet †
- Constantin Pantazi
- Gherman Pântea
- Ovidiu Papadima
- Iustin Pârvu
- Lucrețiu Pătrășcanu †
- Florin Pavlovici
- I. Peltz
- Nicolae Penescu
- Constantin Titel Petrescu
- Dumitru Petrescu
- Dinu Pillat
- Ilie Pintilie
- Ion Pistol †
- Cristian Popescu Piedone
- David Popescu
- Mitică Popescu
- N. Porsenna
- Grigore Preoteasa
- Dragoș Protopopescu
- Gogu Rădulescu
- Mihai Rădulescu
- Savel Rădulescu
- Șerban Rădulescu-Zoner
- Alexander Ratiu
- Leonte Răutu
- Ion Rîmaru †
- Mihail Roller
- Radu R. Rosetti
- Filimon Sârbu †
- János Scheffler
- Ion Dezideriu Sîrbu
- Barbu Slătineanu †
- Gheorghe Ștefănescu
- Boris Stefanov
- Nicolae Steinhardt
- Chivu Stoica
- Vasile Stoica
- Adrian Stroe
- Alexandru Todea
- Sandu Tudor
- Eugen Țurcanu †
- Gheorghe Ursu †
- Gheorghe Vasilichi
- Constantin Vasiliu †
- Alice Voinescu
- Mircea Vulcănescu
- Richard Wurmbrand
- A. L. Zissu
- Alexandru Zub

== Current use ==
The current director of the penitentiary is Cristina Antoanela Teoroc. As of December 2023, there are 1,049 detainees at Jilava.

The Romanian government has nominated the facility, along with four other prisons used during the communist era, to be included as UNESCO World Heritage Sites.

== General and cited references ==
- Muraru, Andrei (2008). Dicționarul penitenciarelor din România comunistă: 1945–1967 (in Romanian). Institutul de Investigare a Crimelor Comunismului în România. Iași: Polirom. ISBN 978-973-46-0893-5. OCLC 297531689.
