= Grindu, Tulcea =

Grindu
- Commune
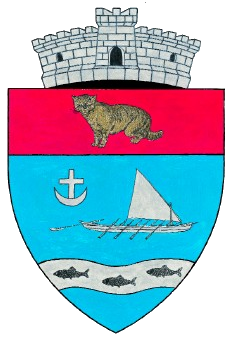
- Coat of arms

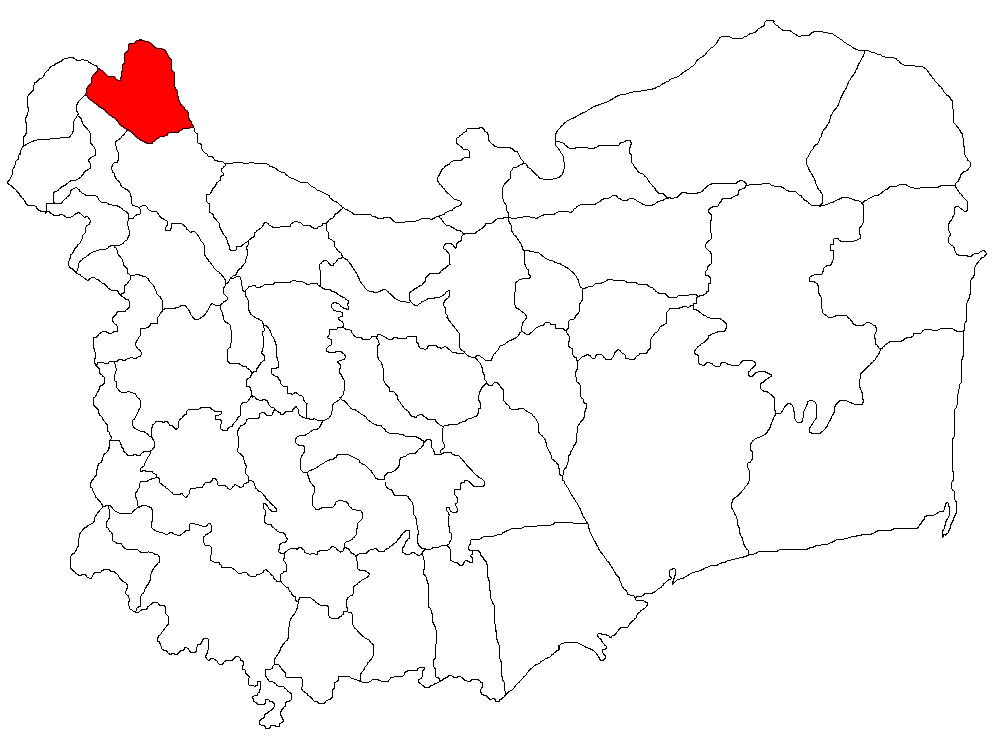
- Location in Tulcea County

- Location in Romania
- Coordinates: 45°24′N 28°13′E
- Country: Romania
- County: Tulcea
- Area: 117.49 km^{2} (45.36 sq mi)
- Population (2021-12-01): 1,271
  - Density: 11/km^{2} (28/sq mi)
- Time zone: EET/EEST (UTC+2/+3)
- Vehicle reg.: TL
- Website: comunagrindutl.ro

Grindu (formerly Pisica) is a commune in Tulcea County, Northern Dobruja, Romania. It is composed of a single village, Grindu.
