= Ion Ioanid =

Romanian dissident and writer

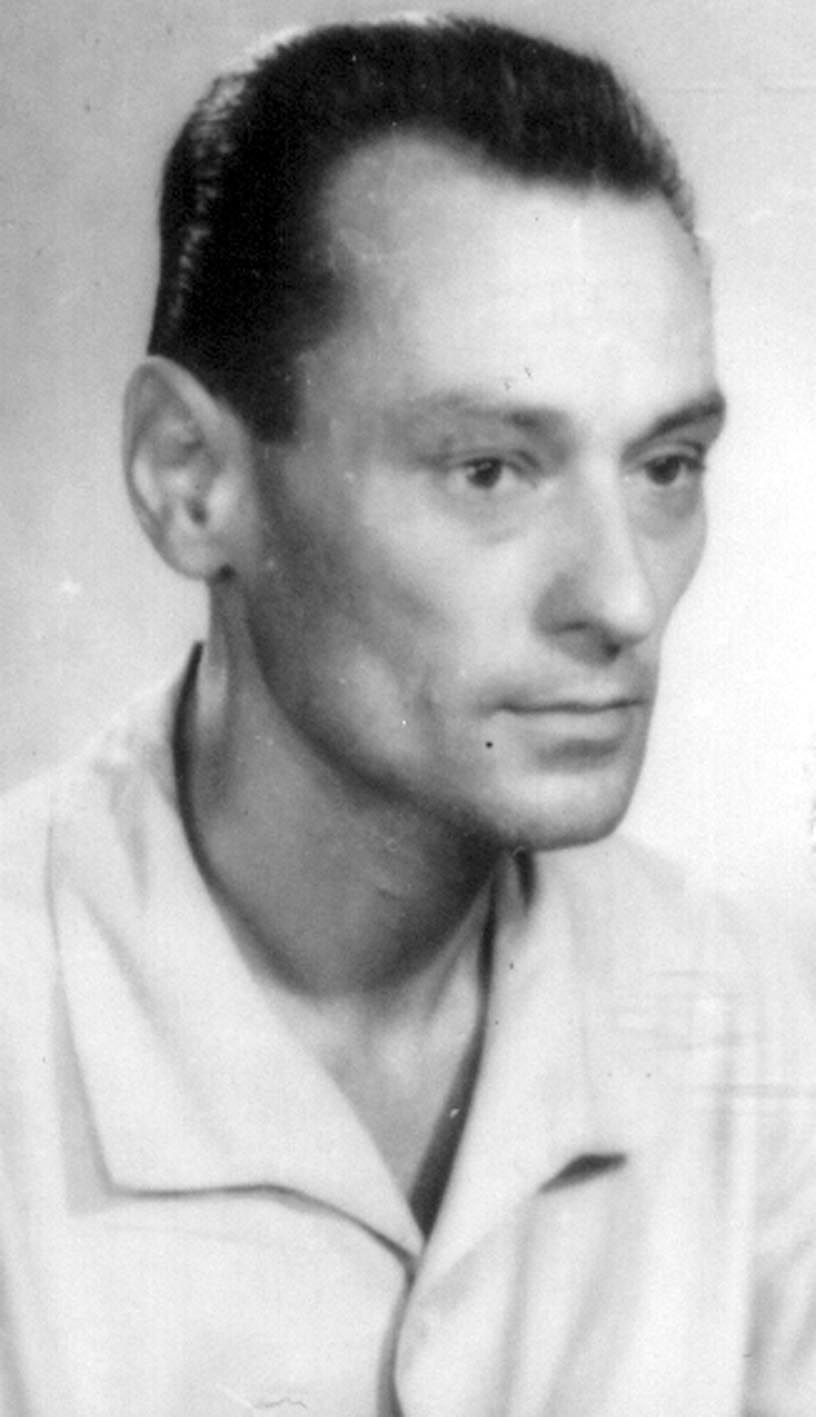
- Born: 28 March 1926; Ilovăț, Mehedinți County, Kingdom of Romania
- Died: 12 October 2003 (aged 77); Munich, Germany
- Occupations: Memoirist; Radio Free Europe announcer
- Writing career
- Notable work: Give us each day our daily prison

Ion Ioanid (28 March 1926 – 12 October 2003) was a Romanian dissident and writer. Ioanid was a political prisoner of the communist-led regime after World War II, who spent 12 years in prison and labor camps. He is best known for taking part in the 1953 Cavnic lead mine labor camp escape and for his book "Give us each day our daily prison" (Închisoarea noastră cea de toate zilele), a reference to the verse from the Christian Lord's Prayer. The book is a comprehensive recollection of his time spent in detention. He is considered a Romanian Solzhenitsyn, as his description of the communist detention regime in Romania is the most detailed one submitted by one of its victims.

== Biography ==
Ioanid was born on 28 March 1926 at his father's estate in Ilovăț village, Mehedinți County. His godfather was Octavian Goga, a friend of his father, Tilică Ioanid. Tilică Ioanid was descended from an old and well-known Greek landlord family, a National Liberal Party member, and a secretary in the Romanian government led by Miron Cristea before World War II. Ioanid attended primary school in Ilovăț, then continued his studies in Bucharest, the first six years at Saint Sava High School, and the last two at Spiru Haret High School. He received his bachelor's degree in 1944, at the Șișești village school, where both teachers and students sought shelter from the allied bombardment. In 1945 he enrolled in law school, but was expelled in the third year because of his "unhealthy social origin", as his father was a landlord.

Ioanid was first arrested in 1949, but was released a few days later. In 1952 he was arrested again, and this time he was sentenced to 20 years of forced labour. He spent the next 12 years in several prisons and labor camps, and was released in 1964, following a pardon decree targeting political prisoners. He left Romania in 1969 and sought political asylum in West Germany. There, he worked for more than 20 years as a Romanian announcer and journalist for Radio Free Europe.

== Give us each day our daily prison ==
=== 1949. First arrest ===
He was arrested for the first time for facilitating the typewriting of two letters. The first, from his cousin George Boian, containing economic, political, and military information about the situation of Romania at the time, was addressed to a friend outside of the country. The second, from his close friend Baby Ivanovici, was addressed to the Remington Company in the United States. When Boian was arrested, the letters were found upon him, and as such Ioanid was also involved. He was detained at Malmaison Prison, in Bucharest, where his investigation was held. Beaten and tortured into admitting his part in the so-called plot — the other persons involved were cross-examined in parallel, and any lie told with the intent of protecting the others was eventually revealed — he was released a few days later.

=== 1952. Second arrest. Pitești Prison and trial ===
Following the purge in May 1952 of the Vasile Luca, Ana Pauker, and Teohari Georgescu group, a new wave of political trials was initiated and Ioanid was again arrested. Taken with the entire Boian group to the Securitate regional headquarters in Pitești, he was part of a mock trial led by general Alexandru Petrescu, who also led the trial against Iuliu Maniu. Eventually Ioanid was sentenced to 20 years forced labor.

"Everybody was surprised, by this I mean that the guards as well were amazed. Apart from two or three defendants, who received less than 5 years, all the sentences were starting at 10 years and going up, most represented 15 years of forced labor. The highest punishment was [given] to George Boian, a life-long forced labor sentence for high treason. The smallest one was [given] to N.Z.: three years. I received 20 years of forced labor for complicity to high treason. All our assets were seized and we received an additional 3 to 5-year civic rights suspension. The fifty-four, fifty-five people tried that day accumulated more than 800 years of prison. None of us, not even the most pessimistic, would have made such an assumption. The terms were so absurd, even in relation to the deeds being punished, where such were not made up, that after the first moment of bewilderment, I felt like I was part of a hoax."

— Ion Ioanid, Închisoarea noastră cea de toate zilele. Vol. I, p. 42

After the trial, regardless of its location, as it was the procedure back then, the convicts were transferred to the Jilava Prison via railroad. Days or weeks could pass before a suitable train was available. From Jilava, they were assigned to either prisons or labor camps all over the country, as the conviction stated. After the trial, the prisoners were no longer detained at a Securitate location, but moved to the local prison. For Ioanid, the Pitești Prison detention, although a short one this time, compared to future detentions, was the first contact with a communist prison. As he was only a temporary prisoner here, and the worst of the brainwashing experiments performed in this facility were terminated earlier the same year, he was not subject to them.

However, it was the first contact with the brutality of the prison guards, as "it was pouring curses and fists, generously distributed to all those who were not executing orders fast enough", with the strictness of the detention, as the inmates were not allowed to talk loud to each other, sing, look outside the window, attempt to communicate with other cells, lay down in bed during the day, or perform many other ordinary tasks.

They were tortured, either directly — beating and isolation were commonplace — or indirectly, with bad food or malnutrition, lack of hygiene, deprivation of almost all or any medical care. Opening the prison cell during the night was not allowed for guards except in the presence of a higher rank officer, and only in exceptional cases: severe injury or death, so emptying the bucket was not possible. The content was spilled over the window, which led to a pestilential odor all over the prison.

Ioanid makes vivid portrayals of the inmates he met in detention centers, from simple peasants who opposed the nationalization process, to former members of the historical parties. He describes citizens who were unfortunate enough to have an unhealthy origin, or make an out-of-place remark towards the communist leadership, to Iron Guard members, all victims of the communist purging machine.

=== 1952. Jilava Prison ===
In early October 1952, Ioanid was moved from Pitești to Jilava Prison. The transport train arrived once in a while, and it was many times the case that those transported were crowded in the small compartments: "When they started pushing the ninth prisoner, we were downright crushed, barely able to breathe. [...] The highest price for closing the door was paid by the ones positioned closest [...] they were savagely beaten with clubs and fists. Blood was all over their faces". On arrival in Bucharest, they spent one night in the common-law designated prison of Văcărești, before being moved to the prison in Jilava.

"Straight from the entrance, the spectacle proved worthy of Dante's Inferno. A staircase with a seemingly endless number of steps. On each of the first seven–eight steps, on both left and right, there was a bucket, some on the verge of, some already overflowing all over the stairs, all the way down, forming an ooze of feces and urine. The stink was awful. I shall not say unbearable, since that would not be true. Not only we bore it, but after a few hours we did not even notice it anymore. Alongside almost every bucket there was a prisoner, satisfying his needs, one way or the other, either in, either aside. They looked terrible: most were weak with their heads shaved, all having their clothes torn apart and patched as I have never seen before, not even on beggars. The dim light, hanging above the staircase, gave the surroundings an eerie look".

— Ion Ioanid, Închisoarea noastră cea de toate zilele. Vol. I, p. 56

Ioanid's first Jilava stage lasted about six weeks. At the time of his stay "...commander in chief was captain Maromet. Of Gagauz origin, heavily stuttering, he was famous for his cruelty and sadism. Personally beating the inmates, his favourite torture was that, during summer, he had the windows of the overcrowded cells nailed closed, until, because of heat exhaustion and lack of air, people started to faint". In the middle of November, he was assigned to a batch of 150 prisoners that were to be transferred to a new labor camp at the Cavnic mine, in Maramureș County. The requirements for the lot were such that the prisoners would be capable of hard mine work: they had to be younger than 35, healthy and with convictions exceeding 15 years. However, in the end, the numbers had to be completed with men crippled and up to 60 years old.

=== 1953. Escape from Cavnic labor camp ===
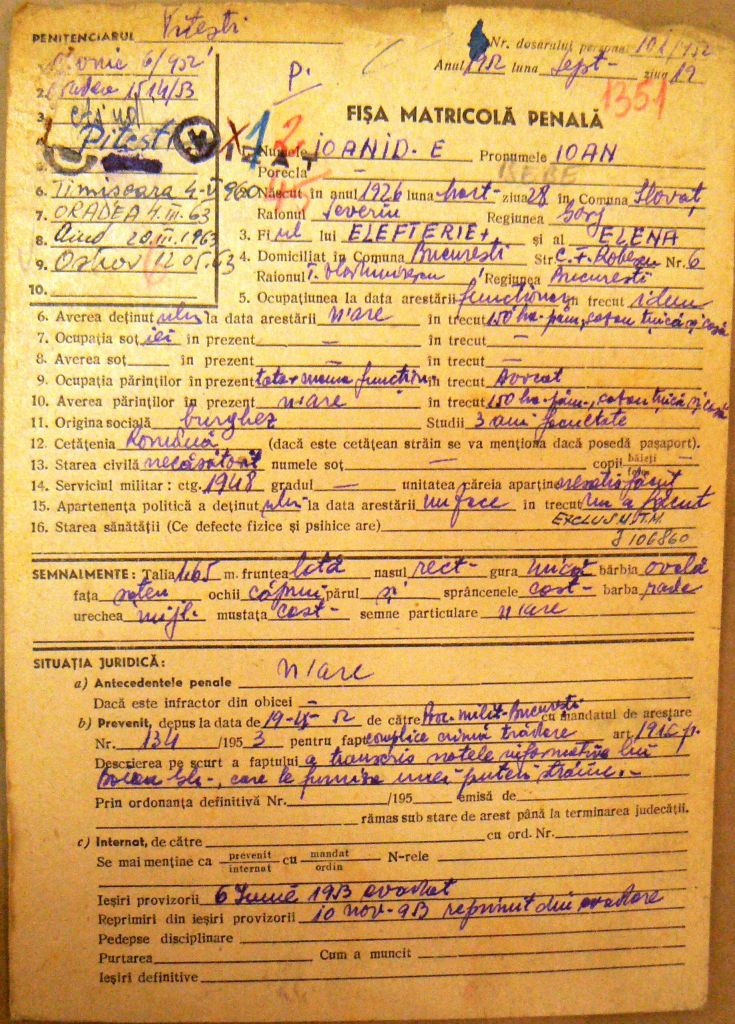
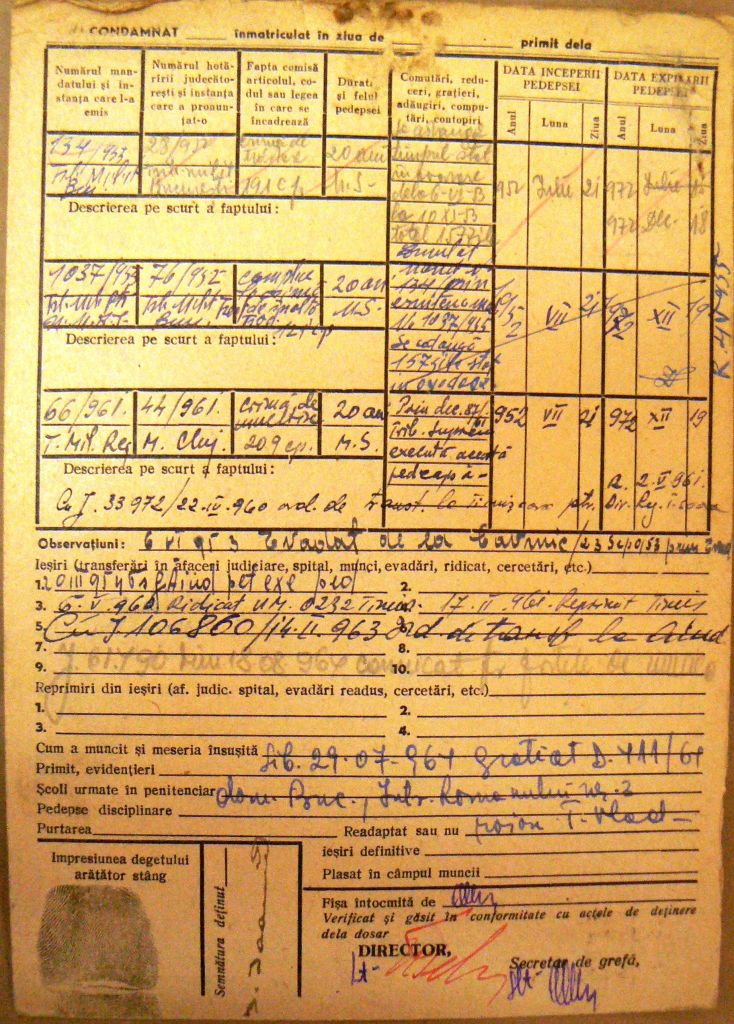
Incarceration papers for Ion Ioanid. Several detention places are listed: Aiud, Pitești, Timișoara, Oradea, and Ostrov (Great Brăila Island)

From Jilava, the prisoners were transferred to the Cavnic mine labor camp, in northwest Romania, close to another, older, labor camp at Baia Sprie. (See Lead mine prison camps in Communist Romania.) Before World War II, the Cavnic mine belonged to a Romanian-Belgian company, which closed down the facility because of low profitability. Subsequently, the Baia Sprie Mining Plant decided to reopen it. They provided the technical and logistic guidance, while the Ministry of Internal Affairs provided the labor force, consisting of political detainees. Aside the Jilava lot, also a group of older prisoners, from the Baia Sprie camp, was assigned to start work at this new mining facility. There were also civilian miners working there. The civilian work force was concentrated at the −100 m (−330 ft) work front, while the labor camp force, completely isolated from the first, was concentrated at the −200 m (−660 ft) work front.

At first, as part of the overall experiment, the prisoners were housed in brand-new huts and even overfed. They were told by the administration that the civilized behaviour towards them, detention comfort and food amount depended on the level of the performed work quota. Coming from prisons all over the country where personal space was very restricted, and where cold and famine were regular, the inmates started working hard, raising the workload on a daily basis. In time, the food quality and quantity worsened, and so did the administration's behavior towards them. They were not able to meet the high workload anymore, and this also led to conflicts with newly arrived inmates, who were accusing the old ones of Stakhanovism. Ioanid gives a detailed description of work techniques and equipment during the daily shift. However, there was always a competition between the camp administration and the prisoners. The first wanted high work output, while the latter wanted to work as little as possible, to avoid injuries and prevent overwork-related health issues. The inmates used any possible means to sabotage the work effort: intentionally damaging the equipment, reporting false – bigger – quotas or not reporting rich ore veins when discovered so that they could be slowly exploited. Working underground was difficult, depending on the exploited vein, temperatures and humidity could be very high, or freezing cold water could pour from the ceiling. Mining accidents were frequent and many died or were maimed. Mining-related diseases were also common. Those who opposed the administration were punished with cruelty:

"The solitary was some sort of a booth, built up of wood boards, where you could only fit standing up. To make it even more uncomfortable, several layers of barbed wire were pinned on the inner walls. So leaning on the walls was out of question as well. There was no roof, hence snow got inside, and because thawing during the day, mixing it with the soil, it transformed into mud."

— Ion Ioanid, Închisoarea noastră cea de toate zilele. Vol. I, p. 155

Not being committed to a tight-security prison, Ioanid was determined to take the necessary risks and attempt an escape. Meanwhile, he befriended several other prisoners, some of whom expressed similar thoughts. Eventually they formed a group and planned to escape the following spring. The group consisted of:

- Ion Pantazi: captured during an attempt to illegally cross the border and sentenced to 5 years of forced labor. Part of the Baia Sprie group.
- Constantin Coșereanu (Titi): fought during the war with the German forces on the Baltic front line (as he was a student in a German Military School). His sister was married to an American assigned to the military mission in Bucharest, and through this route he was providing unfiltered and uncensored information about the Communist authorities' actions in the country. Captured and sentenced to more than 20 years of forced labor.
- Ion and Simion Cojocaru, brothers. They were given heavy sentences for taking part in the uprising that followed the nationalization of peasant property in Vrancea County.
- Ion and Gheorghe Brînzaru, brothers. Same as above.
- Colea Ungureanu
- George Sarry
- Mircea Vueric
- Dr. Miltiade Ionescu (Mache)
- Dr. Paul Iovănescu
- Alexandru Ciocâlteu (Ducu), sentenced to more than 20 years during the staged trial against the Vatican nunciature in Bucharest.

As they arrived at the camp in late autumn, the plan was to wait for early summer in order to escape. Escaping during winter posed several problems, such as no shelter in the leafless forest, freezing temperatures and no possibility to cover the snow tracks. This was a period, after the second world war, when Romania was completely isolated from outside information flow. At the dawn of the Cold War, people still believed that Allied forces would start a new war against the Soviet Union and this war could lead to freedom (the Vin americanii! notion). As such, after escape, almost all planned to join the guerilla forces that were still active in the mountains or attempt to flee across the border towards the West.

The group of prisoners escaped on 6 June 1953. Taking advantage of the poor security inside the mine, they managed to get out during the shift change using a tunnel destined for the civil miners. They met no resistance except one guard and a civil engineer, whom they overpowered and tied up.

Outside the mine, they split up. Ioanid, Coșereanu, Vueric, and Ion Cojocaru eventually regrouped, but after a few days, they split up again, Ioanid and Coșereanu being the ones that stayed free for the longest period. Most of the escapees managed to slip outside of the area where the secret police started patrolling after they noticed the missing prisoners. All were eventually captured, some at the Soviet border, where they arrived by mistake, some during police raids, and some even betrayed by their own family. From Cavnic, they headed east, across Maramureș County and the Rodna Mountains, feeding on what they received from the shepherds and peasants they met; most of whom, despite the escapees' efforts to conceal it, recognized they were fugitives. After 18 days, on 24 June, they reached Iacobeni village, from where, with money received from the local priest, they bought train tickets to Bucharest, arriving there the next day.

=== 1953. Capture. Baia Mare inquiry ===
In Bucharest, Ioanid had several acquaintances, either family, school friends of people his father had assisted. The first month they lived in the apartment of a good family friend, Constantin Boceanu. Boceanu had left the city for the summer, and his landlady – knowing about the escape from Ioanid's confession – insisted they would stay there until his return. Before Boceanu got back, Ioanid's mother managed to find them a new hideout, in the house of Anița and Dinu Hariton. There was no detailed plan on how to continue from here on. One possibility was to attempt an escape towards west, by hiding on a barge that transported timber to Austria, with the help of Rici Tailer, who apparently specialized in such actions. During the three-month stay in Bucharest, they visited several friends and also relatives of the people they had met in incarceration, giving them information about the whereabouts and health of their family members, information that was not officially available because of the secret service censorship. They avoided meeting with close family members, as they might have been under police surveillance. Leaving the capital or travelling around was difficult without official identification papers. Through the help of underground organisations, they tried to obtain fake identification, and Ioanid managed to get work at a building site at Drăgășani, Vâlcea County in early September. Here fictitious employees were listed on the payroll by bribing the officials. However, one of the clandestine outfits they used to obtain fake identification was uncovered, and this lead took the police to the Hariton family. When returning from Drăgășani, on 13 September, Ioanid was arrested.

"Convinced that I had no intention of pulling out a gun or whatever other hidden weapon, they rushed up towards me, faking – for the few people passing by, intrigued at this curious crowding from the square – the joy of a friendly rendezvous. Each one could not contain from friendly remarks: 'How are you, comrade? How long since we saw each other last?' The height of enthusiasm was shown by the first to arrive at my side. He jumped, embraced me, held my head in his hands, kissed me on both cheeks, saying: 'If you only know how long I have been waiting for you!' [...] The following events happened with a sleight and speed worthy of some experts. In this simulated stampede, one got my suitcase, two put their arms around my shoulders, while the others, in an instant, searched me thoroughly. Everything happened while walking, since almost the same time I got to see myself reaching the green car; and not even to this day can I remember how many of us fit inside, on top of each other."

— Ion Ioanid, Închisoarea noastră cea de toate zilele. Vol. I, p. 311

Held for more than a month in Bucharest, Ioanid and Coșereanu (who had been arrested before Ioanid) were moved to Baia Mare, in Maramureș County. Thinking they would be sent back to Cavnic, here they were again cross-examined, when it became clear – a conclusion derived from the investigators' questions – that most, if not all, of the escapees had been captured.

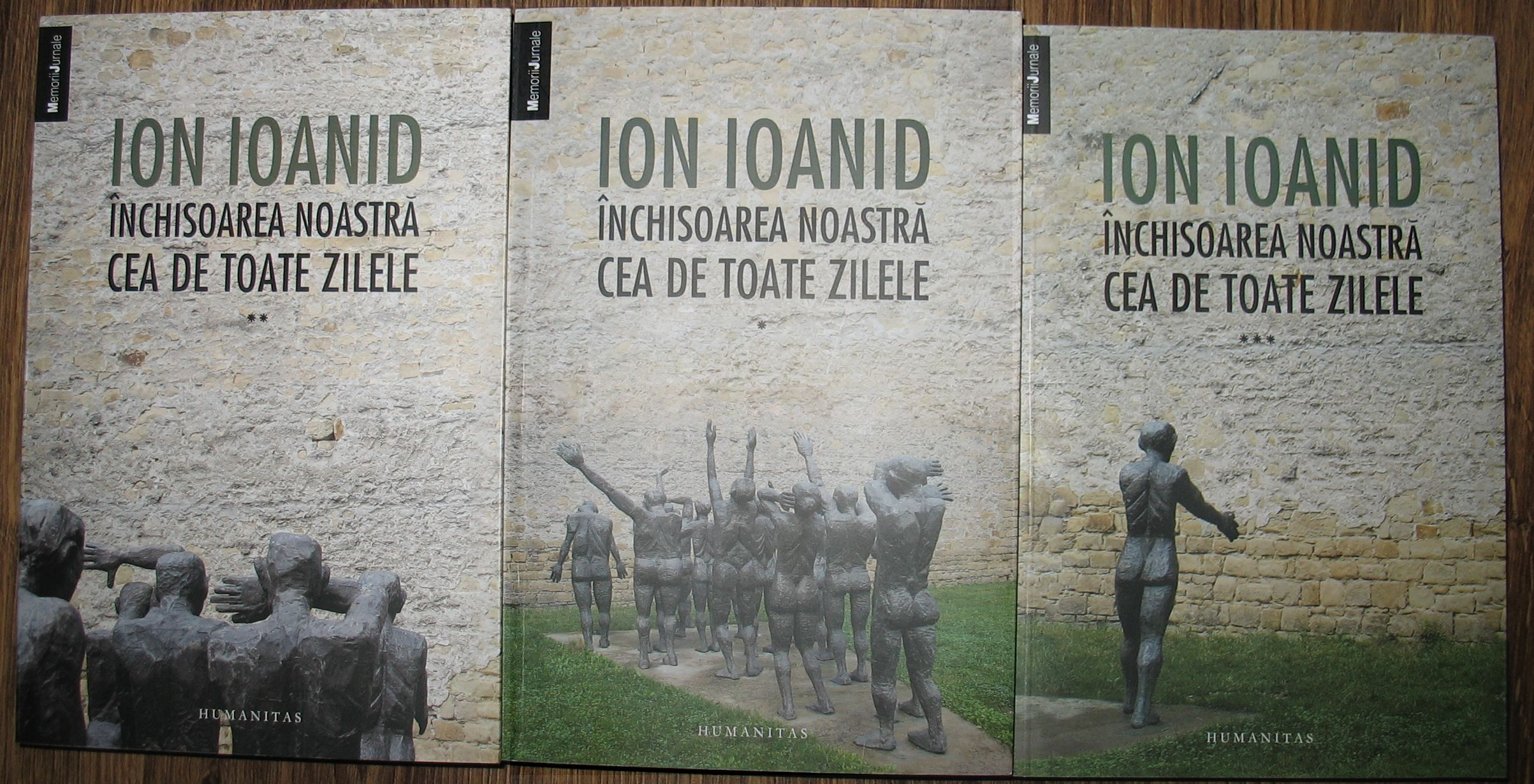
His only work, 'Give us each our daily prisons' is a comprehensive recollection of the time spent in detention.

=== 1953–1954. Oradea Prison ===
After the investigation at Baia Mare, the two were sent to Oradea Prison, which "[...] was in fact a dungeon, reminiscent of the Hungarian times, with one meter thick walls and iron bars latticed windows, behind which, visible from the outside, the broken glass and peeled plaster gave the impression of a deserted building." Here they reunited with the rest of the escapees, who had also been recaptured. During the cross-examination preceding the trial, it became clear that one of them was a denouncer, as the investigators had a very deep insight about the escape plans, connections between the Cavnic prisoners and civilian workers and personal details about the escapees. It turned out that the culprit was Alexandru Ciocâlteu, a surprise at first for Ioanid, since Ducu was one of the most actively involved prisoners in the escape planning. After his capture, the same qualities that his colleagues appreciated, intelligence and energy, were turned against those he had helped to escape. Aside the 13 escapees, also the civilians and other prisoners who helped them escape were held at Oradea. This way, it was possible to find out what were the consequences of their actions on the other prisoners at Cavnic. Although their ordeal worsened, with daily raids and searching through the barracks, increased and impossible quotas in the mine, as well as hardened punishments for every small act of defiance, the inmates did not show grudge on the group and had unanimous support towards their actions. All the members of the group had received previously severe terms in prison, so for some there was the fear that the Cavnic incident may lead to the capital punishment. As the strongest supporter of this idea, Ciocâlteu tried to convince the others that the best solution would be to show full cooperation with the secret police. On the other side, the rest of the group had no intention on cooperating with the authorities, and put pressure on Ciocâlteu so he would withdraw the statements made during the inquiry. He was treated as an informer, a snitch, which was one of the worst offenses within the prison walls. As a result, during the following trial, trying to please both parts, he made confusing statements, which only helped the prosecution, used to manipulate ambiguous statements to its advantage. In the end, Ioanid's sentence was one year for prison escaping, five years for use of explosives (which, although he manufactured, he did not use) and eight years for political conspiracy in prison. The first two sentences were merged in the highest one and three years were added for aggravating circumstances, in the end resulting in additional eleven years to serve. Later, this conviction was merged to the previous one of 20 years hard labor. The incarceration conditions were severe, as the winter of 1953–1954 was very cold.

"The hardships I had to endure during the almost five-month-long stay at Oradea Prison were cold and famine. The remaining misery – lack of hygiene, loneliness, lack of medical care and the managements behavior towards the inmates was easy to endure compared to these ones. [...] I was continuously shivering. [...] Always crouching, trying to make the most of the small blanket, covering my head. I recall that, if I was facing the cell window, I could see a spotlight lighting up the prison courtyard through the old and spent fabric. After a few minutes, warmed up by my breath alone, I used to stop shaking, but the legs always felt frozen, in contact with the cold iron chains. However, this was the time I usually dozed off. I don't think it lasted more than 15 minutes. I used to wake up again, all numbed up because of the uncomfortable position, knees to mouth. [...] Because of the cold, I felt the need to urinate a lot. I suspect it was cystitis, and it got worse over time, up to the point when I had to go 15-20 times per night. Most of the night time was spent using the bucket, moving around to take the chill off and cuddling under the blanket in a futile attempt to waste as little warmth as possible."

— Ion Ioanid, Închisoarea noastră cea de toate zilele. Vol. I, p. 380

In addition, the food was scarce and non-nutritious. As it was the general understanding of the prisoners, their chances of survival were low in these conditions, so they decided, paradoxically, that the only solution not to die of starvation would be to go on hunger strike. Still, the attempt was only partially successful. After a few days, realizing that the management was not yielding towards any concessions, and scared at the prospect of force-feeding, they gave up on the strike. "Sitting up, walking down the hallway and especially going down the stairs happened as inside a nightmare, when you want to step down or do whatever other movement and the limbs are not responding to your intentions. I could not control the size of the step, nor its general direction. Everything was happening as in a slow motion film.". Although it was officially a failure, the strike had resulted in some improved prison conditions, especially in terms of food.

=== 1954–1955. Aiud Prison ===
In May 1954, following the new conviction, Ioanid was moved from Oradea to the Aiud Prison, the destination of political prisoners considered most dangerous: "Its reputation was well established. The prison of all prisons. It became a symbol. The Holy of Holies." Here the isolation from the outside world was the most severe. The Aiud detention center consisted of several buildings, the oldest of which was reserved for political detainees. Its nickname was Zarca (from Hungarian zárka, meaning solitary).

"The extermination process had different implementations: in labor camps it was forced labor, impossible to achieve quotas, all sort of deprivation, lack of hygiene, of medical treatment, excessive cold or heat, beatings etc; in prison, the means were identical, except forced labor that was replaced by systematic starvation; in the Zarca, the main instrument in achieving the goal was time."

— Ion Ioanid, Închisoarea noastră cea de toate zilele. Vol. I, p. 474

The regime here, in terms of food and authorities vigilance, was more relaxed at first than at Oradea. The increased quantity of food helped the dystrophy suffering inmates recover and it was possible, with extra care, contrary to prison rules, to get short periods of sleep also during the day. The intentions of the regime became clear with time. The prison doctor was Cornel Petrasievici, an inmate himself and former colleague of some of the Cavnic mine group at the Baia Sprie labor camp and a close friend. He was well respected for his professional and ethical integrity. As many of the prisoners had severe health issues, it was his task to request the proper medication to the prison overseers who brought them from the outside. However, for certain detainees, it was always reported that medication was not available. As such, if he would prescribe the needed medication on someone else's file, the medicine was approved, showing thus that some were explicitly marked for extermination. One graphic account is that of the suffering of Radu Gyr. Aside from physical exhaustion, he was also suffering from rectal prolapse. "I clearly recall Cornel's words: 'after every stool, his intestine was forty centimeters on the outside'." Patrasievici had to fix the problem using only a washstand with warm water. During one of the many solitary punishments received while in Aiud, Ioanid recollects being sent to a room where he managed to contact his neighbors, by talking close to the window bars. In one cell, the prisoner was novelist and memoirist Constantin Gane, who later died in the Aiud prison in 1962, while in the other one it was poet, playwright, essayist and journalist Gyr.

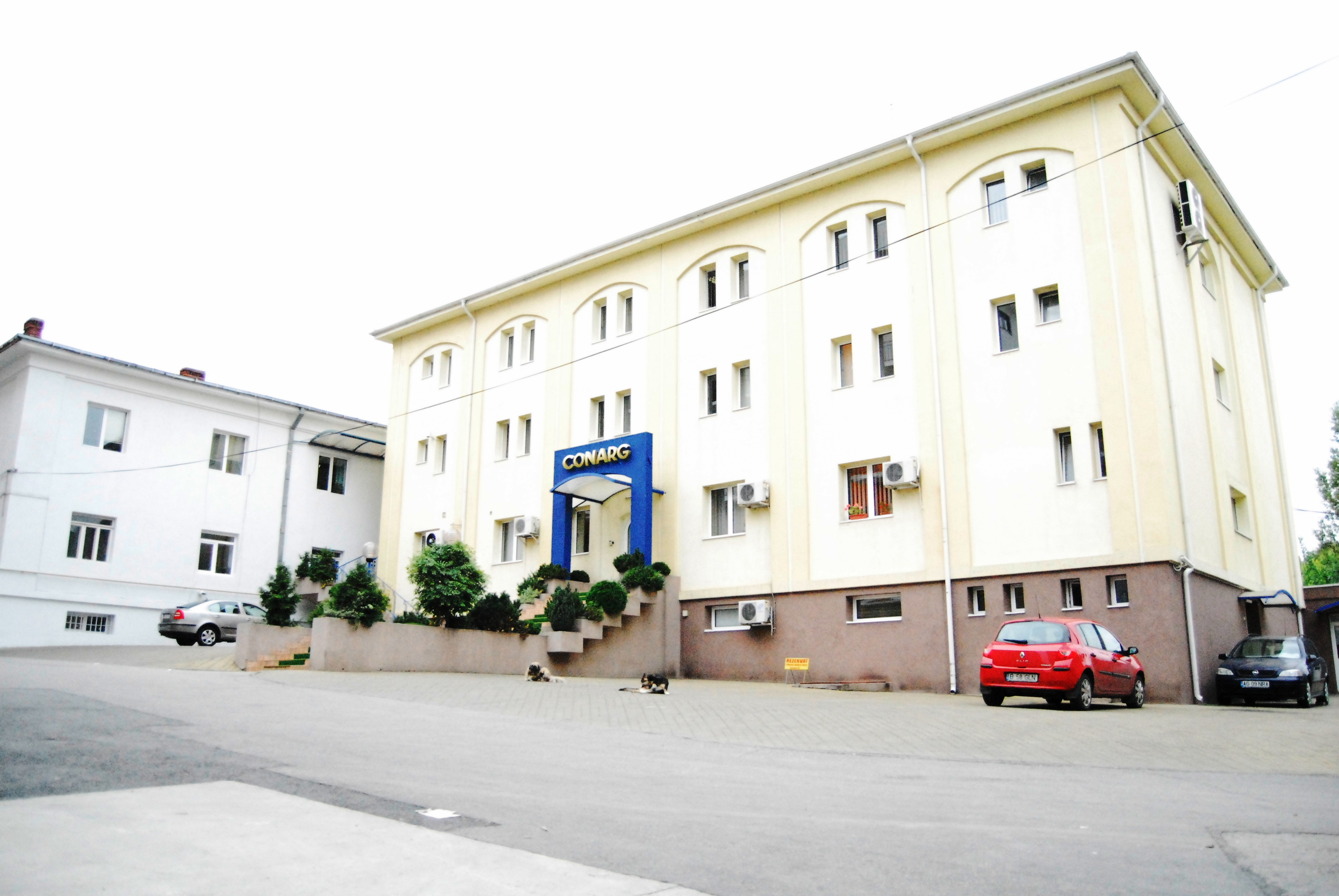
Pitești Prison, where Ioanid spent 6 years. It functioned as a detention facility until 1977. Abandoned and partially in ruin, the building was sold to a construction company in 1991.

=== 1955–1960. Pitești prison ===
Beginning of 1955, Ioanid and Coșereanu were moved from Aiud to Jilava. Here, they attended the trial of Ioanid's mother and M.C., both accused of not denouncing them while hiding in Bucharest, after the Cavnic escape. Although their presence was not required, the defense attorney, Benea, managed to get them transferred there through a bureaucratic wrinkle. Ioanid was arrested in Bucharest and his arrest file was initiated there, but later he stood trial in Oradea, where a new file was documented. Due to excessive bureaucracy, the Bucharest court was not yet informed about the sentence from Oradea and as such they were called in to appear in court again. In the courtroom, Benea presented the sentence to the judge, and the trial did not take place; yet, under these circumstances, Ioanid was able to meet with his mother. From Jilava, they were not sent back to Aiud, but to the Pitești Prison. Again, with the specter of rehabilitation in sight, they found worse conditions there than at Aiud.

"The room we entered had a gloomy sense to it, and it took some time to adjust and be able to distinguish what was going on in there. The first senses that came into contact with the surroundings were smell and hearing. I was no stranger to the mixture of prison odor, bucket, unwashed bodies and DDT, still there was this fetid stench that was striking from the very entrance. While trying to get the eyes accustomed to the inside darkness, I could sense we stirred motion around the cell, like the tinkling of a mechanism, made up of metal gears. As through dense fog, we started seeing the scaffolding, made up of overlapping iron beds, with little room in between. The motion we detected were the detainees, getting off their beds so they could greet us. They were also responsible for the metal roar, as all were wearing chains on their feet. Now we understood why the officer laughed when Titi asked him to remove our chains."

— Ion Ioanid, Închisoarea noastră cea de toate zilele. Vol. II, p. 105

As in Oradea, when the incarceration conditions worsened, the inmates decided to go on hunger strike. The initiative was met with general endorsement, as with extreme care – and occasional retaliation when caught – it was possible to communicate with other cells and coordinate such an activity. The demands were: court case review after the file statements that were obtained by means of torture are removed, a retrial and the right to choose the defense attorney, citation of the prosecution witnesses and hearing them in court, medical treatment for the sick, improved diet, the right to write and receive letters, to speak with members of the family and the right to receive and own books and writing materials, among others. Undergoing such an endeavor was risky, as usually such actions were followed by prison staff retaliation, best case targeted only towards those who initiated it, worst case targeted towards all the prisoners, many old and weak. At the start of the strike, in May 1956, some 150–160 prisoners reported they would not eat the received food, which totaled almost half of the prison political detainees. The management reacted with the usual response, ranging from threats (of violence, new terms, solitary), promises of better conditions (which usually lasted only for a limited period) or attempting to set discord among the strike group. Many gave up on the strike, but at least 56 continued. Of course, the management could not give into all the demands, and as such it finally came to force-feeding. Ioanid recalls his own personal experience of the ordeal: "At the very first sip, when the tube Ciortan was pushing barely passed the larynx, the involuntary contraction of the esophagus in contact with rubber was so violent, that in an instant, feeling as if choking, I pulled it out. [...] While trying to regain my breathing, holding back on the cough and queasiness, Ciortan threatened he would have me tied to the chair unless I kept my hands behind the back." The process was repeated several times before the strike ended. This time, there were several concessions made by the management: the diet got better, a new set of clothes was received, the guards' vigilance lessened, and inmates were able to perform actions not possible before (sleep during the day, talk out loud or with other cells, make custom tools, etc.), the solitary stopped being used, so were chains and the sick were either treated in the prison hospital or, if the case was beyond local competence, moved to an external facility.

Out of the almost 12 continuous years spent incarcerated, Ioanid spent the longest period in Piteşti. As for former detention places, detailed portrays of the political convicts and prison staff are presented here, as well. External political events of the age, such as the Hungarian Revolution of 1956, are presented through the eyes of inmates. As Romania was situated somewhat at the border between eastern and western blocks, every major event that could have adverse consequences towards the regime usually had two stages.

At first, a slight improvement in the detention conditions would be observed, since the prison personnel feared the outcome of the event. As it was often proved, even for the perpetrators of the rehabilitation, it did not take much for the aggressor to end up behind bars. But if the events turned out favorable for the leaders, conditions suddenly went for the worse. Such was the case for the Soviet intervention in Budapest on the 4th of November 1956. In the aftermath, inmates were officially told, a prison first, that breaking the prison rules would lead to retaliation in the form of physical punishment.

"Truly, no prisoner showed any visible signs of being impressed by the threats, although we all suffered the same shock: it was the first time we were notified of possible physical punishment, with the official consent of the prison management. Even during the worst periods, when it was raining fists, clubs and boots all over our bodies, the senior staff would not admit authorizing such practices. The victim's complaints were always rejected as false and only seldom accepted as an abuse of a guard, of which they had no knowledge of and felt to dissociate with care. The fact that now, they were accepting, willingly and in advance, the responsibility of applying physical punishment, as a disciplinary measure, made us realize the difficult times we were facing. [...] The hypocrite villain, who used to renounce his actions, made room to the cynical one, who did not care of covering them up anymore."

— Ion Ioanid, Închisoarea noastră cea de toate zilele. Vol. II, p. 397

The prison staff behaviour fit the same general direction as in other political prisons. The warden was – for most of the time, till after the strike, when he was replaced – captain Mândreș, nicknamed Bogeyman due to his savage attitude towards the prisoners. The staff's actions were as abusive as possible. Medical care, actually the lack of it, always reminded the inmates how little life was valued in there. In the unhygienic prison conditions, boils were a common problem. When treated, it was usually in an advanced stage, and surgery was necessary. No anesthesia was used, just alcohol and a knife. Aside from excruciating pain, this often led to further infections. But the refusal of medical care was a very efficient execution method. Such was the case of Alexandru Balș, suffering from asthma. Every now and then, he received a few ephedrine pills, which helped, but not enough for a continuous treatment. In time, he got weak and "As time passed by, without the administration taking any sort of action towards saving his life, it became clear for us that Balș was deliberately sentenced to death, the sentence being carried out through lack of medical care.". After weeks of agony, by the time it was already too late, he finally got the proper medical attention from the prison doctors. Unable to move, his cell colleagues had to sign for his medicine; later, after his death, this was recorded as proof that he did, in fact, receive the necessary treatment.

The medical training of the prison doctor was such that, when Colonel Mihai Kiriacescu suffered a cardiac arrest – and resuscitation did not help – his colleagues requested him having an adrenaline shot; the injection was done by the medic in charge, Ciortan, half an hour later, intramuscularly, in his thigh.

The ordeal was both physical and mental, and the inmates tried to resist it through any possible means. Communication with other cells through Morse code helped them receive valuable information about their friends, while the need to communicate with the outside world, by any means, was insatiable. Pavel Constantin, a fellow inmate and friend, who was released while Ioanid was incarcerated in Pitești, proposed to him a method of receiving information from the outside. Since it was possible to observe, from the prison cell window, the street outside the walls, it would be feasible to send from there messages, Morse coded, inside the facility. After release, Constantin went to Ioanid's mother and, at well established times, once a month, she applied this method. As it was very difficult and ineffective – the distance was great and it was hard to make out the body gestures needed to emulate the signals – as well as very risky, this happened only a few times, before giving up on the procedure.

There was even a revue staged during one New Year's Eve, inside Ioanid's cell, with sketches and poetry, music and satire towards the prison staff. Dark humor was highly appreciated in prison.

=== 1960–1962. Timișoara Prison ===
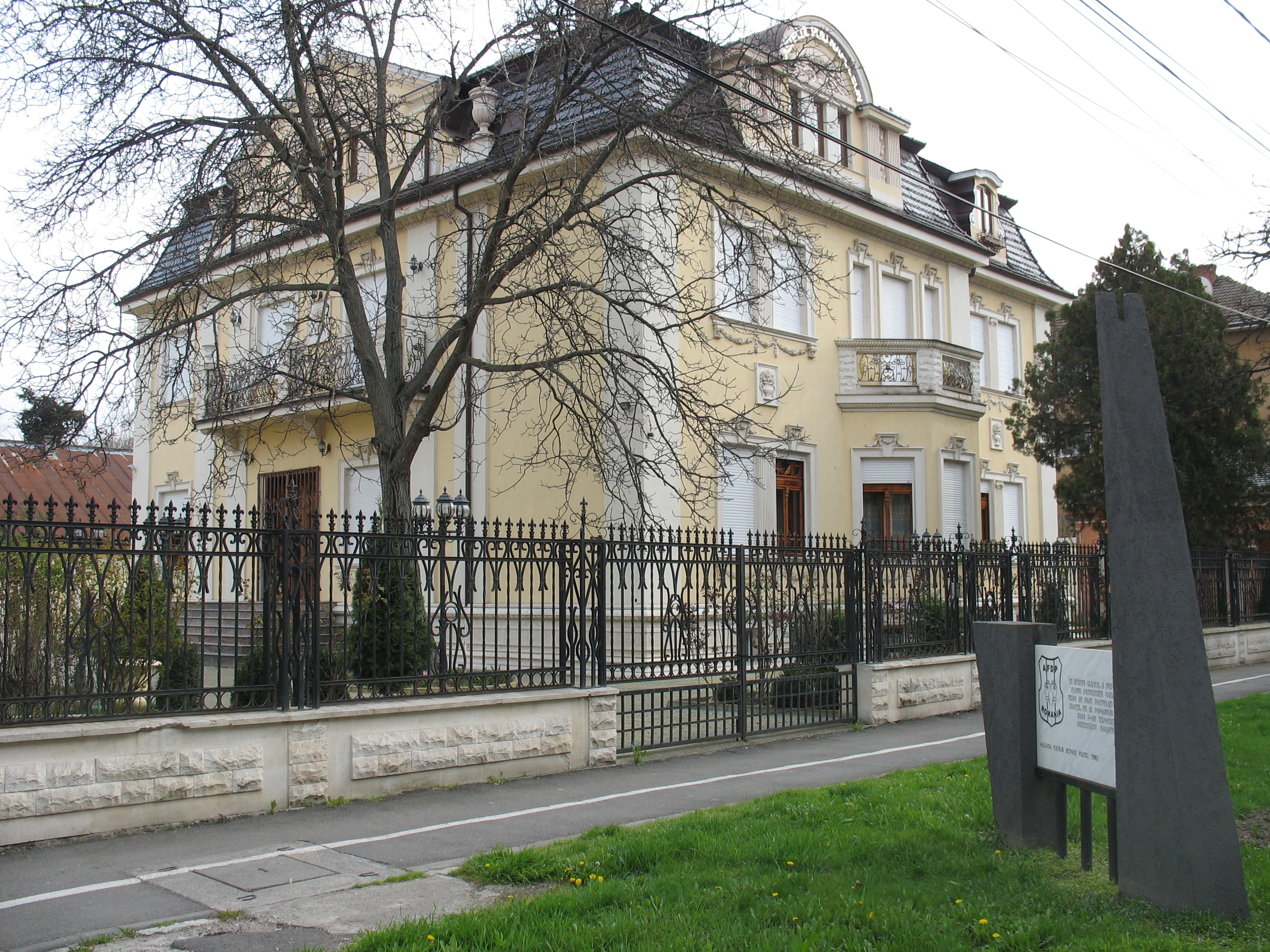
House on C.D. Loga street, Timișoara, with a memorial in front. The text translated to These houses were the headquarters of the Communist Secret Police, where the sons of the Romanian people, who opposed Bolshevik satanization, were tortured and killed.

In April 1960, Ioanid was moved from Pitești to Timișoara Prison, where he was subjected to a new secret police investigation regarding his involvement in the Ion Baicu group. After the war, the anti-communist resistance was known to Ioanid, although from his accounts it does not appear that he took part in any actions. For some time, General Aurel Aldea sought shelter at the Ilovăț residence in order to organize the resistance, and although George Boian was his main confidant, Ioanid was also aware of the plans made there. Ioanid met Baicu in Bucharest, and recommending himself as a fugitive Iron Guard member, he met all the necessary qualities to get him trusted. During the following months, the group around Baicu – Ioanid included – met several times, but aside from making plans, there was no further outcome. Finally, before the group was dismantled, Ioanid took part in several shipments of weaponry from Bragadiru, a town near the capital, to Bucharest. It is for these actions that he was questioned again in Timișoara. His investigator was Lieutenant Aurel Jerca, and, until the trial, he was detained at the local secret police quarters, on the C.D. Loga boulevard. In order to avoid being tortured, as in previous interrogations, he was advised on how to simulate suffering from angina. Due to the inherent risk of death that such diseases posed in case of physical torture, investigators avoided it in case of suffering prisoners. During the trial, he admitted being part of the Baicu group, but denied all involvement regarding the weapon shipment from Bragadiru. Baicu and Ioanid received the highest punishment of all the group, an additional twenty years of forced labor. After the trial, Ioanid was moved to the Popa Șapcă Prison in Timișoara, where he remained incarcerated until 1962.

=== 1962–1964. Salcia labor camp ===
In the early spring of 1962, Ioanid was moved from Timișoara to Aiud, and then to Salcia labor camp in Brăila County. Very sick, Ioanid barely made it to the Salcia camp located in the Great Brăila Island in the system of Brăila Swamp labor camps.)

"If at first I barely realized finding myself in the massive wagon compartment, pressed and squeezed closed to stifled, only standing up due to the surrounding bodies cramped like sardines, then there were moments of unconsciousness and rambling, out of which I got awoken solely by the tight chains around my swollen ankles or by the suffocating sensation in my lungs, vise-like pressed by the crowded and tormented bodies around me. Then my senses went back to numbness and I was slipping into unconsciousness again. I was all sweated up, head to toe, cheeks and forehead felt like fire and my tongue felt like tinder. I took note as somebody wiped my face with a wet cloth, and through the dense body mass, a cup of brackish water reached my way yet felt like spring water."

— Ion Ioanid, Închisoarea noastră cea de toate zilele. Vol. III, p. 253

Here, he was sent to work the very next day after arriving, doing corn weeding. Passing out on the field and taken to the camp hospital, he was diagnosed with tuberculosis by doctor Mihai Savu, a good friend of his father. A pleurisy was detected and he was subjected to thoracentesis, having 800g of fluid removed from around his lungs. Ioanid spent most of the summer under medical care, doing several errands for the doctors in the medical facility, thus avoiding the harsh work on the island. This would not be the only medical problem during the two years stay at Salcia as he also got infected during a leptospirosis epidemic, during the spring of 1964. Years prior to this epidemic, another one made several casualties among the inmates. This time, the authorities' reaction came sooner and, being treated with chloramphenicol, there were no victims.

Assigned again to a labor camp, Ioanid experienced the same behavior and routines as in Cavnic. Stimulated by the authorities' violence and overall camp conditions, the attitude of the detainees, aimed towards self-preservation, led to mass sabotage and utterly inefficient work procedures. There are several episodes presented, such as wasting tons of pesticides as they are discarded over the fields on high winds (the only health-related measures being a toxic sign on the container bags), a whole crop of sunflower seeds being compromised because it was stored before it was well dried (yet the inmates told their guardians later about this, because in the storage house where the seeds were kept it was warm during winter, thus avoiding working on a different task out in the cold), prisoners, old and weary, being sent to harvest frogs for export, the one-day work resulting in two captures, and so on. And then there was the violence, hard and exhausting work, bad food, with dead flies forming a crust on the afternoon soup, rats running around the camp, causing foot spanking on the latrine floor, in order to scare them away, to become a natural habit. Arriving here, almost 10 years after the Cavnic events, the thought of escape rooted again. One considered possibility was swimming across the Danube to the mainland, into Northern Dobruja, then attempting to reach the southern border and flee into Bulgaria, then Greece. Still, several events that occurred showed that the age of political repression was coming to an end. Another labor camp, Grǎdina, was closed, and all the remaining inmates were moved to Salcia, suggesting that forced labor in the Great Island was about to be discontinued. Then, political propaganda got more aggressive, informing those who had rejected the fake image of communism, that the regime reported overall success through the country, praising its achievements. At first, prisoners were allowed to read Scînteia, the party newspaper, but when they ostentatiously refused to do so, it became mandatory practice by order of prison officials.

=== 1964. Release ===
Following the general decree of amnesty towards political prisoners, Ioanid was released from prison on 29 July 1964. In 1969 he left Romania and was granted political asylum in West Germany. He took residence in Munich, where he worked as a Romanian announcer and journalist for Radio Free Europe from 1970 until he retired in the mid-1990s. Ioanid died in Munich in 2003, at age 77.

== References in literature and television ==
Ion Ioanid in particular and the Cavnic mine escape in general were the subject of the 28th episode of Memorialul Durerii television program, which aired on national television after the 1989 revolution, depicting the abuse of the Communist Party towards the Romanian people. The program was also made into a book, and a chapter is dedicated to Ioanid.

== See also ==
- Romanian anti-communist resistance movement
- Radu Gyr
- Pitești Prison
- Aiud Prison
