= Cavnic mine =

Mine in Romania

Coordinates: 47.6425°N 23.8738°E

- Location within Maramureș County Location within Romania

Location
- Location: Cavnic, Maramureș County, Romania

Production
- Products: Lead, Zinc, Gold, Silver, Copper
- Production: 6,000 tonnes of lead and 8,000 tonnes of zinc
- Financial year: 2008

History
- Opened: 1958

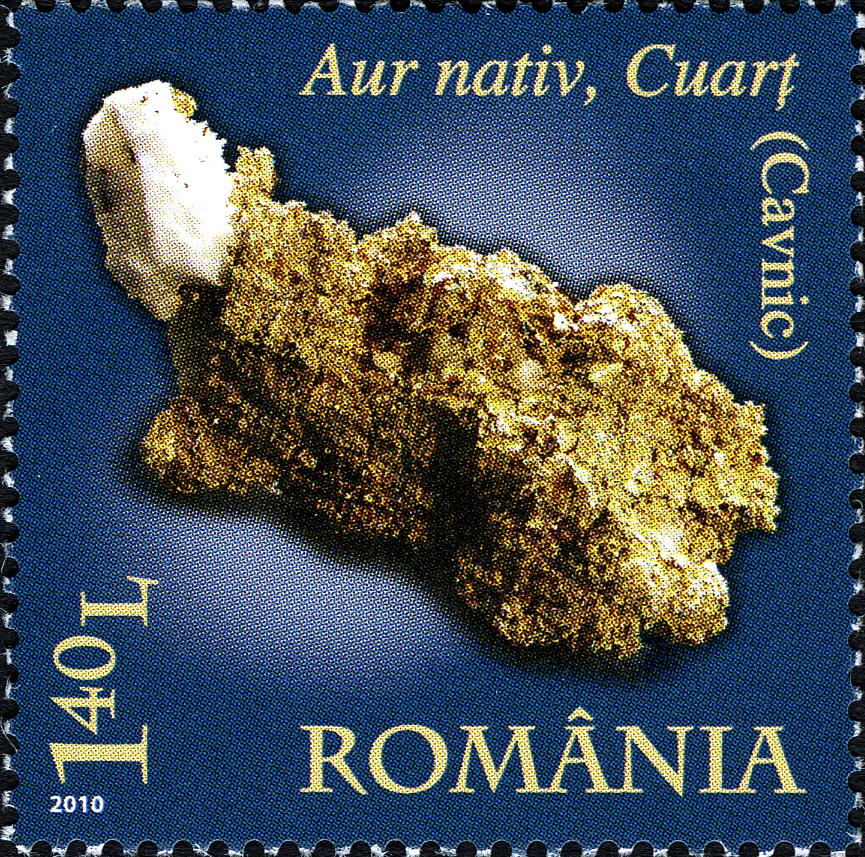
Stamp of Romania from 2010 showing gold ore from Cavnic

The Cavnic mine is a large mine located in the northwest of Romania in Maramureș County, 26 km southwest of Baia Mare and 576 km north of the capital, Bucharest. Cavnic represents one of the largest polymetallic reserves in Romania having significant reserves of gold, silver, copper, lead and zinc amounting to 20 million tonnes of ore grading 1g/t gold, 30g/t silver, 2% lead, 3% zinc and 1% copper. The resources amount to 640,000 oz of gold, 19.2 million oz of silver, 400,000 tonnes of lead metal, 600,000 tonnes of zinc metal, and 200,000 tonnes of copper metal.

In the early 1950s, a communist prison camp operated at the mine.
