= Gheorghe Calciu-Dumitreasa =

Romanian priest and dissident (1925–2006)

George Calciu
- Born: Gheorghe Calciu-Dumitreasa; November 23, 1925; Mahmudia, Tulcea County, Kingdom of Romania
- Died: November 21, 2006 (aged 80); Woodburn, Fairfax County, Virginia, United States
- Resting place: Petru Vodă Monastery, Poiana Teiului, Neamț County, Romania
- Education: University of Bucharest

Gheorghe Calciu-Dumitreasa (November 23, 1925 – November 21, 2006) was a Romanian priest and dissident.

He was born in Mahmudia, Tulcea County. Beginning with his teens, Calciu-Dumitreasa was involved in the activity of the fascist Iron Guard (also known as the "Legionary Movement"), being first arrested for this in 1942. From 1946 to 1948, he studied at the Faculty of Medicine in Bucharest. He was again arrested in 1948 for continued "Legionary activity" and then condemned in 1949 to 8 years of prison for "conspiracy." In 1956 he was sentenced as one of Eugen Țurcanu's torturers in the "experiment" which had taken place in the Pitești Prison, violent infighting among Iron Guard sympathisers condoned and encouraged by the prison authorities. For his role in the experiment he received a new sentence of 15 years of forced labour, however he was released in May 1963 and assigned compulsory residence.

In 1964, he enrolled in the Faculty of Literature and Philosophy of the University of Bucharest; after graduation, he became a French teacher and got married. In 1971, he graduated from the Faculty of Theology in Bucharest and taught French at the Orthodox Theological Seminary in Bucharest. At the same time, he served as a priest at the seminary chapel, where he gave fiery sermons. Calciu-Dumitreasa was again arrested in 1978 and convicted to 10 years of prison for criticizing the regime of Nicolae Ceaușescu during his sermons at the Theological Seminary, where he was working as a professor. Reportedly he suffered beatings and harassment in prison. He was released from prison due in part to pressure from supporters such as U.S. President Ronald Reagan. He spent years in exile in Virginia and ultimately settled there permanently. In the mid-1980s he preached on the Voice of America and Radio Free Europe. While Calciu-Dumitreasa was celebrated as a dissident and intensely promoted in anti-communist propaganda directed at Romania, his past association with fascism was constantly ignored, "if not intentionally hidden". Moreover, he continued to hold controversial views until his death, for example glorifying the "Brotherhood of the Cross", the youth organization of the Iron Guard, deifying Guard leader Corneliu Zelea Codreanu, proposing an idealized vision of Legionarism and denying the Holocaust in an interview in 2006.

After being defrocked by the Romanian Orthodox Church, Calciu-Dumitreasa became a priest of the Orthodox Church in America, which never recognised his defrocking. In 1989 he took charge of the Holy Cross Romanian Orthodox Church at Alexandria, Virginia. In his last years he revisited his native land several times and met some of those whom he had influenced. He remained critical of certain Romanian Orthodox bishops to his last day, claiming they were former Securitate secret police infiltrators.

Calciu-Dumitreasa died of pancreatic cancer on November 21, 2006, at Inova Fairfax Hospital in Woodburn, Fairfax County. He was survived by his wife of over 40 years, Adriana, and their son, Andrei. He was interred at the Petru Vodă Monastery in Poiana Teiului Commune, Neamț County, Romania.
