= Dacian fortress of Beștepe =

- Location within Romania
- 45.087357°N 29.036531°E
- Location: Piatra lui Boboc, Beștepe, Tulcea, Romania

Site notes
- Condition: Ruined

Monument istoric
- Reference no.: TL-I-s-A-05749

It was a Dacian fortified town.
