= Lead mine prison camps in Communist Romania =

The lead mine prison camps in Communist Romania operated in the early to mid-1950s at three sites in Maramureș County: Baia Sprie, Cavnic, and along the Nistru valley.

== History ==
In 1950, the regime established forced labor camps in order to decongest the crowded prisons and to provide free manpower for its projects. That autumn, a camp was set up at Baia Sprie. The mine there was first attested in 1376, taken over by the Romanian state in 1918 and previously employed civilian laborers. Engineers and specialists continued to work alongside detainees, who were up to 45 years old and sentenced to short terms, in order to reduce the incentive of escape. The first detainees came from Aiud Prison in September 1950. They were largely intellectuals under 40 years old, arrested in 1949–1950. A good part were Iron Guard affiliates, while others belonged to banned political parties. Some were veterans of the Romanian Gendarmerie sentenced for war crimes. Others were former members of the Romanian Police or peasants from Vrancea and Dobruja.

Detainees were not allowed to contact their families. Food rations were based on whether the quota was met. Work theoretically lasted eight hours per day but often stretched to ten or twelve. Due to quotas not being fulfilled, Sunday was often a working day. The mine was unbearably hot and stuffy, ideal conditions for fungi; most prisoners contracted eczema. On Easter night 1951, the priests at the camp celebrated the liturgy. The following day, warden Zoltán Szabó shut them into cells. The other prisoners went on strike in solidarity, an action that lasted ten days. Late that year, over a hundred prisoners, former students and workers who had undergone "re-education" at Gherla Prison, were distributed among the cells at Baia Sprie. However, due to the cohesion of the prisoner community, their efforts to continue the process failed. In 1955, the detainees were sent elsewhere and the mine returned to a civilian workforce.

The Cavnic labor camp was created in 1951 with detainees brought from Baia Sprie. Later, prisoners were delivered from Aiud, as well as "re-education" student victims from Gherla and Pitești. Categories of detainees included Guardists, other political affiliates, peasants, military officers, anti-communist resistance fighters and men found guilty of sabotage during the Danube–Black Sea Canal trial. Most belonged either to the Guard or the National Peasants' Party. Detainees were confined to their cells on slight pretexts, such as not saluting guards or resting while in the mine. In early 1953, after two months of being forced to work on Sunday, prisoners went on strike. The strikers were placed in isolation cells for a month and then sent to the most dangerous parts of the mine. Fourteen prisoners escaped one night in June 1953, remaining free for over three months; Ion Ioanid was the last to be captured. A smaller mine, with some 400 inmates, it was shallower, cooler overall and thus less harsh. However, it was very wet inside, with acidic water constantly dripping; this gave rise to cases of eczema and conjunctivitis. The camp was closed in 1956.

A labor camp was established at Nistru in spring 1951 with 50 detainees from Baia Sprie, soon joined by some 200 student "re-education" victims from Gherla and Pitești. Aside from Guardists and Peasantists, detainees included officers, peasants, and guerrillas from the Banat and Muscel Mountains. There was an unheated isolation room where prisoners received only bread and water. Four detainees planned to escape in June 1953. Their leader, a former artillery officer sentenced for Iron Guard activity, was caught and executed in 1955. The other three, peasants, were sentenced to hard labor for life. The remaining detainees were terrorized until September, their food ration reduced, savage beatings applied at will, sent to isolation. At that point, they went on strike; after six days, 50 leaders were sent to Aiud. The mine temperature was bearable, but dust was a serious problem, as the prisoners would inhale it, coating their lungs with silica and lead. The camp was closed in 1955.
