= Cotruș =

Cotruș is a Romanian surname. Notable people with the surname include:

- Aron Cotruș (1891–1961), Romanian poet and diplomat
- Ovidiu Cotruș (1926–1977), Romanian essayist and literary critic
