= Beştepe =

Beştepe may refer to:

- Beştepe, a neighbourhood in Yenimahalle, Ankara, Turkey.
- Beștepe, a commune in Tulcea County, Romania.
