= Timișoara Prison =

Prison located in Romania

- Interactive map of Timișoara Prison
- Location: 7 Popa Șapcă Street, Timișoara; 45°45′43″N 21°13′55″E
- Status: Operational
- Capacity: 1,300
- Population: 1,006 (2024)
- Opened: 1907; 119 years ago
- Managed by: National Administration of Penitentiaries (ANP)
- Director: Liviu Ștefăniță Marica
- Website: anp.gov.ro/penitenciarul-timisoara/

Timișoara Prison is a prison located in Timișoara, Romania. It is intended for convicts with sentences of up to three years, classified under open regime, semi-open regime and preventive detention.

== History ==
The current prison was built after the demolition of the walls of the Timișoara Fortress, and the first written evidence of the existence of a place where prisoners were kept can be found in the Annals of the Kingdom of Hungary from 1514. In 1728, Count Claude Florimond de Mercy, commander of Timișoara and governor of Banat, founds the building intended for the Provincial Court, the arrested being moved to the cellars of the building. In 1807, Emperor Francis I orders their imprisonment in casemate no. 10 of bastion no. 1, and from the completion of the new construction, in 1810, all the prisoners are kept here, until 1907, when it is demolished. It was also then that the construction of the Court-Martial Palace (the current Tribunal and Military Prosecutor's Office) and the military prison (the current headquarters of the Timișoara Prison) was completed.

During the interwar period, the prison housed both common criminals and suspected activists of the banned Romanian Communist Party. From 1937, the common criminals had sentences of up to two years, the rest being sent elsewhere. Seventeen communists, both men and women, were sent to both prisons by court order in September 1942, including Leontin Sălăjan. A 1967 report claims the number of prisoners rose as follows: 200 in 1926, 300 in 1929, 400 in 1937, and 500 in 1941.

Twenty-five prisoners died of unknown causes between 1949 and 1955. There were also cases of summary executions, for example in August 1949, when seven members of the anti-communist resistance movement, told they were being taken from Timișoara to Aiud Prison, were shot in a nearby forest on orders from Alexandru Nicolschi. The prison was mainly a transit center before detainees were sent elsewhere, and suffered from chronic overcrowding. Its inmates, both partisans and illegal border-crossers, were subjected to harsh interrogation by the Securitate secret police; vicious beatings resulted in weeks of incapacitation. Rations were limited to tea, soup and bread. Conditions led some prisoners to attempt suicide or go on hunger strike. The political prisoners were transferred to Aiud and Gherla Prisons following the Hungarian Revolution of 1956. Prisoners included Sever Bocu, Titus Popovici, Coriolan Băran, A. L. Zissu, and Ion Ioanid.

New holding pavilions and auxiliary spaces began to be built in 1995. The closed-circuit TV channel Canal 7 Popa Șapcă began to air in 2002, followed by a radio channel in 2013; both are dedicated to the information and constructive recreation of the inmates. In 2008, the first job exchange for prisoners was organized, which became a constant event, held in partnership with local institutions. As of 2017, almost 60% of the inmates worked within the prison or in dozens of private companies in Timișoara. Some of them also take care of the penitentiary's agricultural and livestock farm, which provides part of the necessary food.
