= Mahmudia =

- Commune
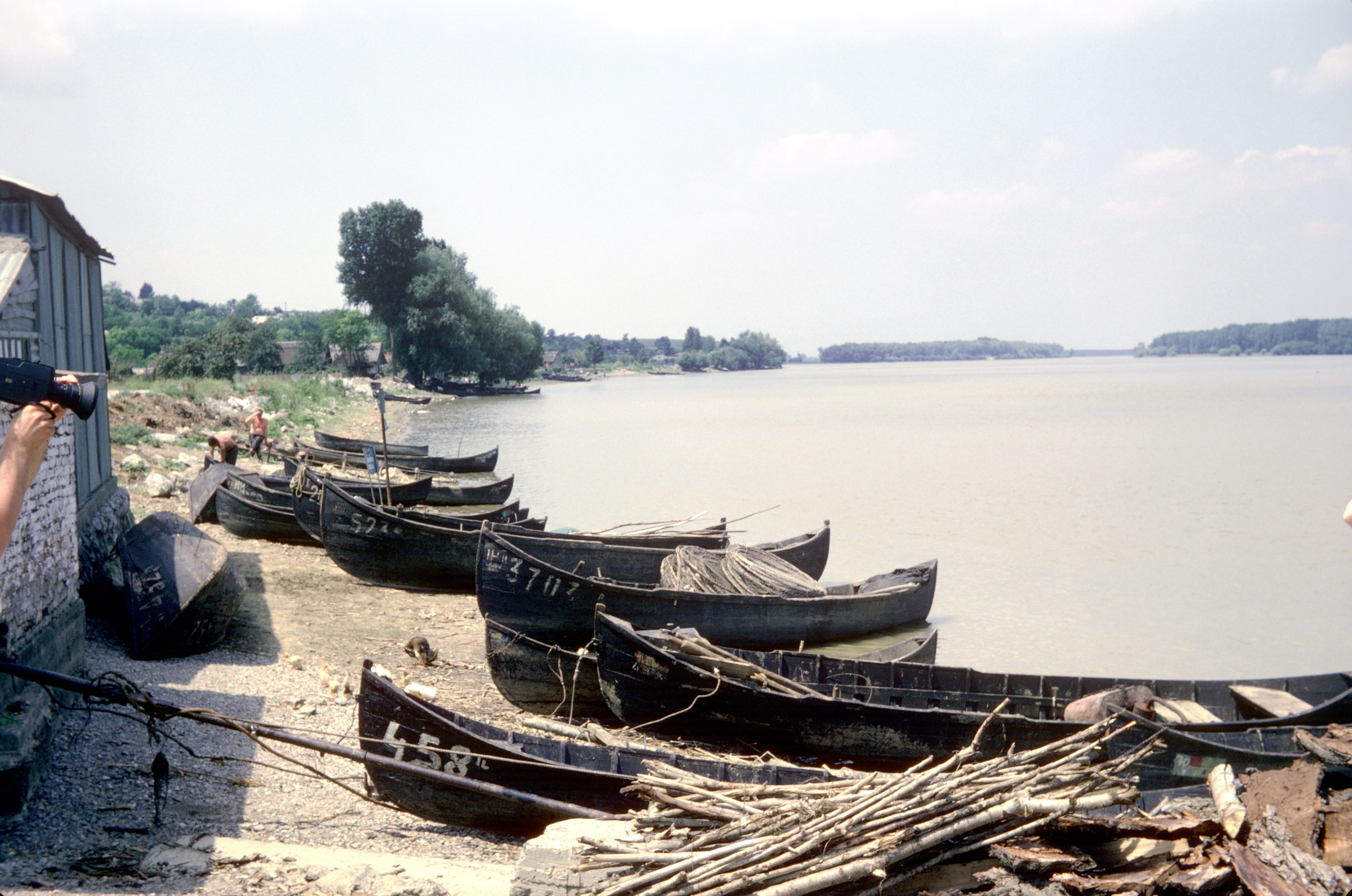
- Traditional fishing boats near Mahmudia

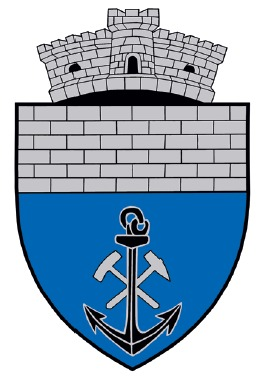
- Coat of arms

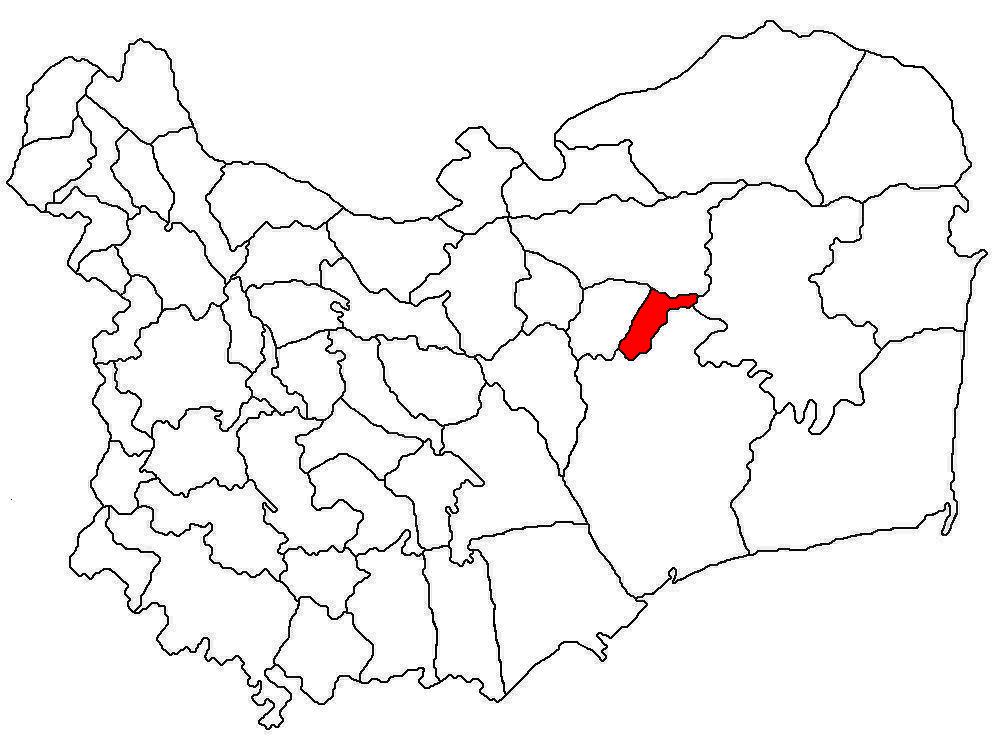
- Location in Tulcea County

- Location in Romania
- Coordinates: 45°05′N 29°05′E
- Country: Romania
- County: Tulcea

Government
  - Mayor (2024–2028): Ion Șerpescu (PSD)
- Area: 65.06 km^{2} (25.12 sq mi)
- Elevation: 16 m (52 ft)
- Population (2021-12-01): 2,163
  - Density: 33.25/km^{2} (86.11/sq mi)
- Time zone: UTC+02:00 (EET)
  - Summer (DST): UTC+03:00 (EEST)
- Postal code: 827130
- Area code: +40 x40
- Vehicle reg.: TL
- Website: www.mahmudia.ro

Mahmudia is a commune in Tulcea County, Northern Dobruja, Romania. It is composed of a single village, Mahmudia. It included the villages of Beștepe, Băltenii de Jos and Băltenii de Sus until 2004, when these were split off to form Beștepe Commune.

== Natives ==
- Dumitru Alexe
- Gheorghe Calciu-Dumitreasa

== Gallery ==
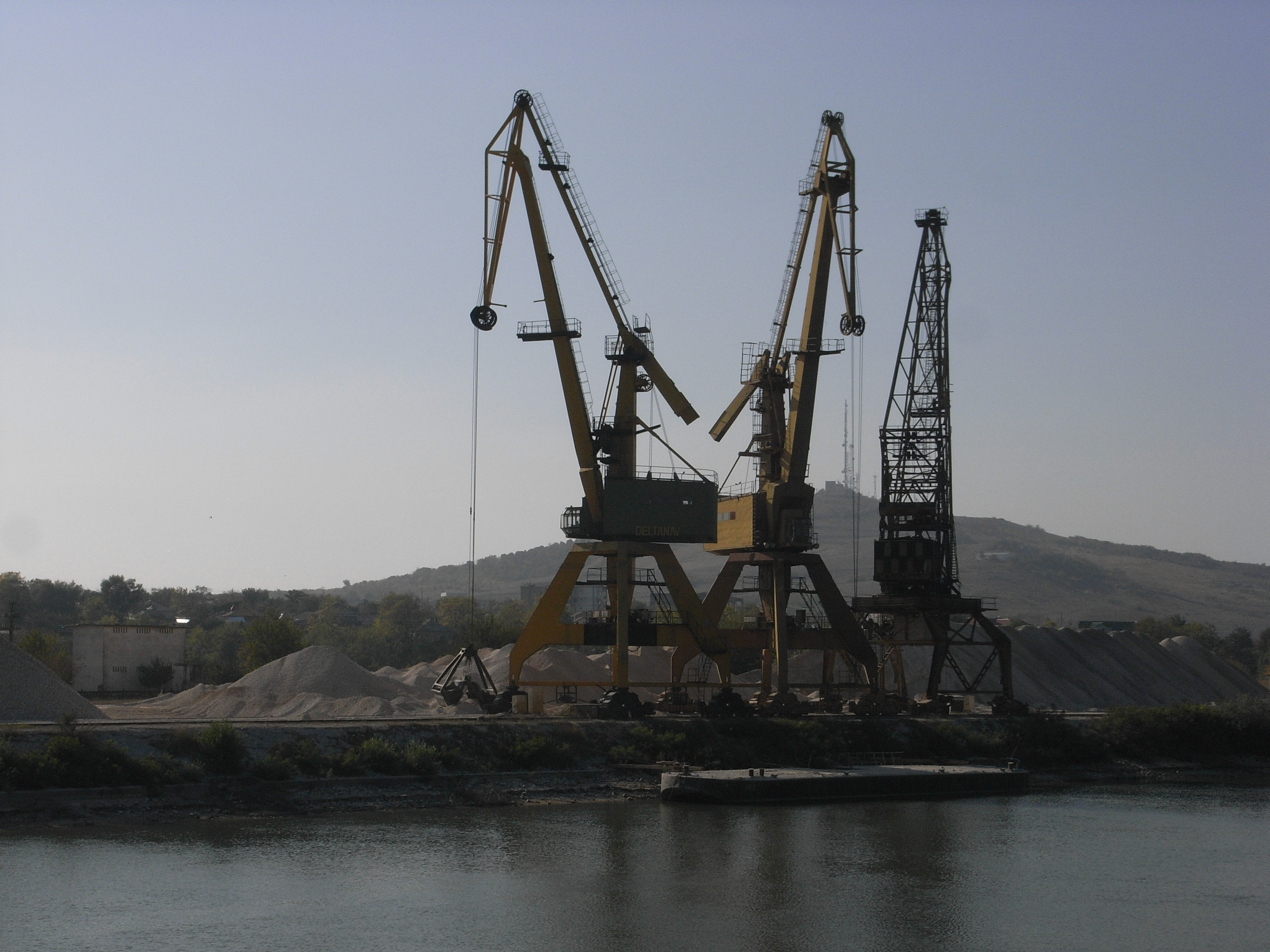
Cranes in Mahmudia

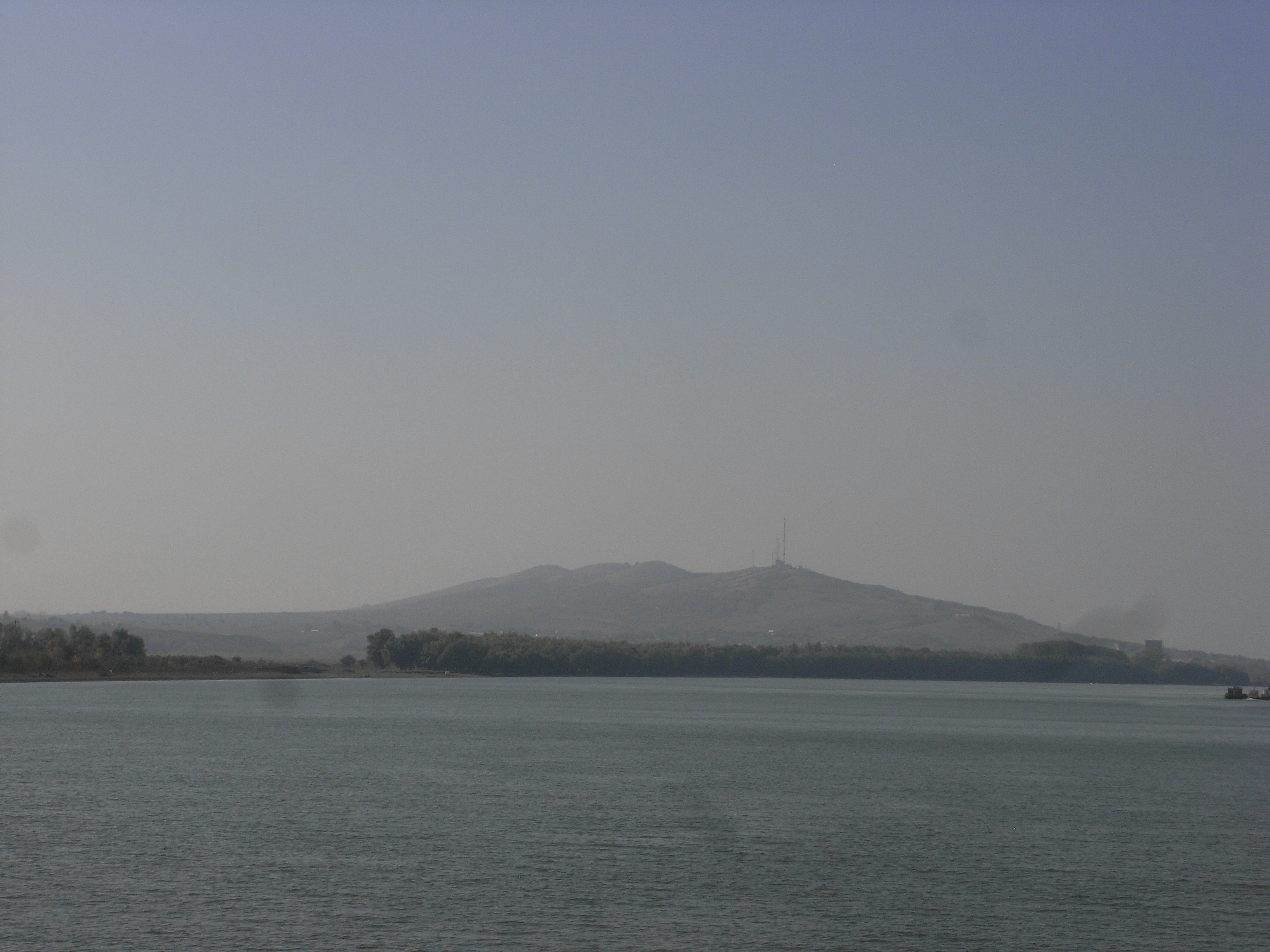
Beștepe Hills
