= Oradea Prison =

Prison in Oradea, Romania

Oradea Prison is a prison located in Oradea, Romania.

Situated in the city center, the prison building dates to 1852. It was bought by the city hall in 1865 and donated to the Hungarian state in 1896. Various annexes were added in the 1880s, and repairs undertaken between 1880 and 1920. The building has three thick-walled wings made of brick with tile roofs. Two, on two levels each, form an L shape, while the third, which has three levels and contains the cells, links them. Until 1944, the prison held both common criminals and political prisoners, a status it retained following the establishment of a Romanian Communist Party-led government in 1945. From that point until 1949, tens of prisoners escaped amidst a backdrop of administrative chaos.

After the establishment of a communist regime at the end of 1947, an unknown number of executions took place inside, and the Securitate secret police applied harsh techniques, including mock executions. Political prisoners included affiliates of the National Peasants' Party and National Liberal Party, as well as members of the anti-communist resistance movement, both men and women. They were held in a separate area, generally one to a cell. The prison's capacity was slightly over 1,000, while the number of detainees varied: 800 to 1,000 in 1945–1950, around 2,000 in 1951–1952, around 1,000 from 1955 to the late 1960s, briefly dropping to 500 in 1958.

As depicted by memoirist Ion Ioanid, the three main adversities faced by prisoners were hunger, cold, and damp. Barred from receiving food packages from their families, they were fed three weak soups per day, along with a piece of bread. Several hunger strikes took place in 1954–1955, without tangible results. Malnutrition caused the lethargic inmates to become visibly thin and develop various diseases. Although the area has a mild climate, the building fostered endemic cold. Prisoners, allotted thin sheets, found sleep a torture, trembling and nearly losing fingers and toes to hypothermia. The walls of the cells constantly gave off moisture. The prison doctor, like the guards, was indifferent to the suffering around him, routinely prescribing two or three pills for nerve pain. Showers were once a week, with no towel or change of clothes, and a bit of petrol-smelling soap. One of the wardens treated the prison as a personal thief, stealing significant amounts of food for the hogs on his farm. A notorious guard would inspect mattresses minutely while shivering prisoners stood before him.

Often, detainees would have to stay linked in chains. Because of this and the cold in the corridors, the guards preferred to stay away, offering them a relative ease of communication. However, cold and hunger soon forced them to lie in bed most of the day, uninterested in conversation. Conditions relaxed slightly in the mid-1950s, during a period of De-Stalinization, but suddenly worsened during the Hungarian Revolution of 1956, when there was a fear that the revolutionaries, if successful, would come and free the prisoners. Adrian Marino was detained there during that period. Other people incarcerated at Oradea included Sorin Bottez, Ovidiu Cotruș, Gheorghe Flondor, and Iuliu Hirțea. There were political prisoners as late as 1967, when one hanged himself, and 1969, when three attempted to escape. That year, the prison became for women only, including Jehovah's Witnesses and illegal border-crossers. It was closed between 1977 and 1983.
