= Iuliu Hirțea =

Romanian bishop (1914–1978)

Iuliu Hirțea (13 April 1914—28 June 1978) was a Romanian bishop of the Greek-Catholic Church.

Born in Vintere village, Bihor County, he attended high school in Beiuș, entering the seminary in Oradea upon graduation in 1931. A year later, he went to the Congregation for the Evangelization of Peoples in Rome, receiving a doctorate in theology. He was ordained a priest in Rome in 1937, by Bishop Valeriu Traian Frențiu. His return to Romania was marked by the handover to Hungary of Northern Transylvania in 1940. From that year until 1945, he was secretary to Frențiu at his headquarters in Beiuș. He then started teaching at the Oradea seminary, following the area's reincorporation into Romania at the end of World War II.

In late 1948, the new communist regime outlawed the Greek-Catholic Church; Hirțea had been arrested in the spring of that year. He was held without trial and released fifteen months later. At the request of Frențiu, who had been arrested, he was secretly consecrated auxiliary bishop of the Oradea Mare Diocese by Gerald Patrick O'Hara in July 1949, although he accepted reluctantly, as the office interrupted his project of a critical edition of the Bible. He carried out his duties until being arrested in December 1952 and condemned by the Military Tribunal of Oradea to 12 years of forced labor for high treason. He was sent to prisons in Oradea, Văcărești, Jilava, Târgu Ocna, Pitești, Satu Mare, Dej, and Gherla, being released in July 1964. He returned to Oradea, his health weakened by interrogations and torture and suffering from tuberculosis. He continued to perform his role until dying in 1978. He was buried in Oradea's Rulikovski Cemetery; in 2007, his remains were reinterred in the city's St. Nicholas Cathedral.
