= Sorin Bottez =

Romanian politician (1930–2009)

- Born: Sorin-Mircea Bottez; June 2, 1930; Timișoara, Timiș County, Kingdom of Romania
- Died: July 31, 2009 (aged 79); Bucharest, Romania
- Burial place: Ghencea Cemetery, Bucharest
- Citizenship: Romanian
- Education: Mihai Viteazul High School; University of Bucharest
- Occupations: Philologist, politician, diplomat
- Employer: University of Bucharest
- Political party: National Liberal Party (PNL); People's Action (PP)

Member of the Chamber of Deputies
- In office 18 June 1990 – 1 September 1992
- Succeeded by: Ion Gutzulescu
- Constituency: Bucharest

Romania Ambassador to South Africa
- In office 21 April 1992 – 15 September 1994
- President: Ion Iliescu
- Succeeded by: Florian Bercea

Sorin Bottez (born Sorin-Mircea Bottez; 2 June 1930 – 31 July 2009) was a Romanian politician who stemmed from the National Liberal Party (PNL). During the post-war period, he was vice-president of the National Liberal Youth (Romanian: Tineretul Național Liberal).

== Biography ==
=== Incarceration during Communism ===
Bottez was born in Timișoara, Kingdom of Romania. He was arrested by the Romanian Communist authorities on 8 February 1949 (then only aged 18 and a half) on the grounds that he was part of the anti-Communist movement "Avram Iancu". At the time, Bottez was a student in the final year at Mihai Viteazul High School in Bucharest. At a trial held on 12 April 1949, he was sentenced to forced labour for 20 years. Bottez was incarcerated at prisons in Aiud, Galați, Gherla, Jilava, Lugoj, Oradea, Pitești, and Târgșor. Throughout his detention, he was reportedly tortured by the prison guards, and later declared he did not collude with the Communist system's secret police. He ended up serving 14 years, being released on 11 November 1963.

=== Academic career ===
Upon his release, he was admitted at the University of Bucharest, in the Faculty of Germanic languages, which he successfully graduated five years later, in 1968. Subsequently, he became a professor of English language and English literature at the university.

=== In post-1989 Romania ===
After the Romanian Revolution of 1989, Bottez was also a member of the People's Action party (PP) of former Romanian President Emil Constantinescu. He served as a deputy on behalf of the PNL for two years during the early 1990s, being elected for the constituency of Bucharest in 1990. In April 1992 he was named Ambassador of Romania to South Africa by then-President Ion Iliescu, and served in this capacity until September 1994.

During the late 1990s, Bottez served as Minister Delegate for Public Information in the CDR-led government of former Prime Minister Victor Ciorbea.

In 2007, Bottez was elected president of the Romanian branch of the YMCA. In 2008 he was elected President of the Association for Citizen Education. He died in Bucharest one year later, and was buried at Ghencea Cemetery. His memoirs, written in collaboration with Florin-Vasile Șomlea, were published posthumously.

== See also ==
- "Sorin Bottez – mărturie filmată despre reeducarea prin tortură. Dialog: Sorin Bottez – Sorin Ilieșiu" (PDF). www.experimentulpitesti.org (in Romanian). June 3, 2008.
