= Ovidiu Cotruș =

Romanian essayist and literary critic

Ovidiu Cotruș (February 24, 1926–September 12, 1977) was a Romanian essayist and literary critic.

== Early life ==
Born in Oradea, his parents were Sabin Cotruș, a geography teacher, and his wife Claudia (née Popa); his uncle was Aron Cotruș. He began high school in Oradea, continuing at the Moise Nicoară High School in Arad. The family had taken refuge there due to the Second Vienna Award's 1940 grant of their native Northern Transylvania to Hungary, and Cotruș graduated in 1944. He studied at the literature and philosophy faculty of the University of Cluj from 1944 to 1948. At the beginning of his university career, this institution was in Sibiu, because Cluj had been integrated into Hungary through the Vienna Award. He was received into the Sibiu Literary Circle, where he was an active participant. Although Cotruș' first published work had appeared in 1943, in the Arad Societatea de mâine magazine, he considered his real debut to have taken place in 1945. This involved poems and reviews published under the pen name Ovidiu Sabin in Revista Cercului Literar din Sibiu, the Circle's publication.

== Background ==
The communist regime carried out repression against members of this group; Cotruș became a wanted man who for a time managed to hide with acquaintances in various isolated villages, aided by false documents procured with the help of his future wife, Delia Giurgiu. For a time, the authorities, who accused him of treason, believed he had fled to Paris in 1948. He was subjected to a political trial in absentia in April 1949, sentenced to seven years' imprisonment for conspiracy against the public order. Finally arrested in Bucharest in 1951, he was sent to Jilava Prison; in November 1953, he was sentenced to an extra year for falsifying documents. While incarcerated, he taught fellow inmates about literature from the confines of his cell, aided by his excellent memory. Transferred to the prison in Oradea, he was amnestied in September 1955. Gravely ill, he spent the next three years in hospitals. He re-entered literary life in 1965, when he became editor at Familia, remaining until 1972. His career was beginning to demonstrate promise when he died prematurely of a serious illness. A street in Timișoara now bears his name.

Cotruș' contributions also appeared in Secolul 20, Luceafărul, and Orizont. His first book, the monograph Opera lui Mateiu I. Caragiale, was published posthumously in 1977. It was followed in 1983 by Meditații critice, a book of studies about Romanian and foreign authors. He took part in several cultural events in Yugoslavia, Spain, Canada, and France; in the latter country, he attended a ten-day festival in 1969 at the Centre culturel international de Cerisy-la-Salle, dedicated to Georges Bernanos. While engaged in these meetings, he published commentaries and reports in magazines abroad. During his last years, he spent time preparing an anthology and collection of interviews with André Malraux, Jean Grosjean, Pierre Emmanuel, Georges Poulet, Jacques Madaule, Eugenio Coșeriu, László Gáldi, and Carlo Tagliavini.
