= Eugen Țurcanu =

Romanian political prisoner (1925–1954)

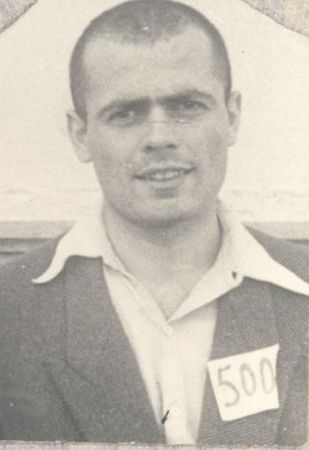
- Eugen Țurcanu
- Born: 25 August 1925; Suceava County, Kingdom of Romania
- Died: 17 December 1954 (aged 29); Jilava Prison, Ilfov County, Romanian People's Republic
- Cause of death: Execution by firing squad
- Known for: Pitești Experiment
- Political party: Iron Guard; Romanian Communist Party
- Convictions: Murder; Torture
- Penalty: Death

Eugen Țurcanu (8 July 1925 – 17 December 1954) was a Romanian criminal who led a group that terrorized their fellow inmates during the late 1940's at Pitești Prison in Pitești, Romania. In a well publicized trial, Turcanu and 15 of his accomplices were convicted in the deaths of several inmates and executed.

As a young man, Turcanu was a local communist official studying for a career in diplomacy. However, in 1948, he went on trial for his involvement with the Iron Guard of the previous regime and was sentenced to seven years in prison.

With the tacit approval of the prison administration, Turcanu formed a group of inmates to obtain information and police the ideological beliefs of the prison population, using torture and deadly force when necessary. When his activities became public knowledge in the West, Romanian authorities put Țurcanu on trial in 1954.

== Biography ==
=== Early life and Iron Guard ===
Țurcanu was born either in Păltiniș, Dârmoxa (today part of Broșteni), or, according to his own assertion, Câmpulung Moldovenesc. He had five brothers; his father was a forester. Țurcanu studied at the Dragoș Vodă High School in Câmpulung Moldovenesc, In December 1940, he joined the Frăția de Cruce (Brotherhood of the Cross), a fascist youth organization in the Iron Guard. Țurcanu participated in the unsuccessful 1941 Legionnaires' rebellion by the Iron Guard in Câmpulung.

While still in high school, Țurcanu fell in love with Oltea Saghin, the daughter of Lazăr Saghin, a lawyer and Iron Guard commander from Câmpulung. They got married and had a daughter, Elena, named after Țurcanu's mother. After the Coup of 23 August 1944 that brought the Communists to power in Romania, Țurcanu became a convert to Communism. In March 1945, he joined the Union of Communist Youth and two years later the Romanian Communist Party. Țurcanu took courses at the University of Iași Faculty of Law for about three years and became a member of the local Communist organization's politburo. He was then sent to Bucharest to pursue a career in diplomacy.

=== Arrest for Iron Guard activity ===
On 25 June 1948, Țurcanu was arrested for charges based on participation in the 1944 coup. On 5 February 1949, the Iași Military Tribunal sentenced him to seven years' imprisonment.

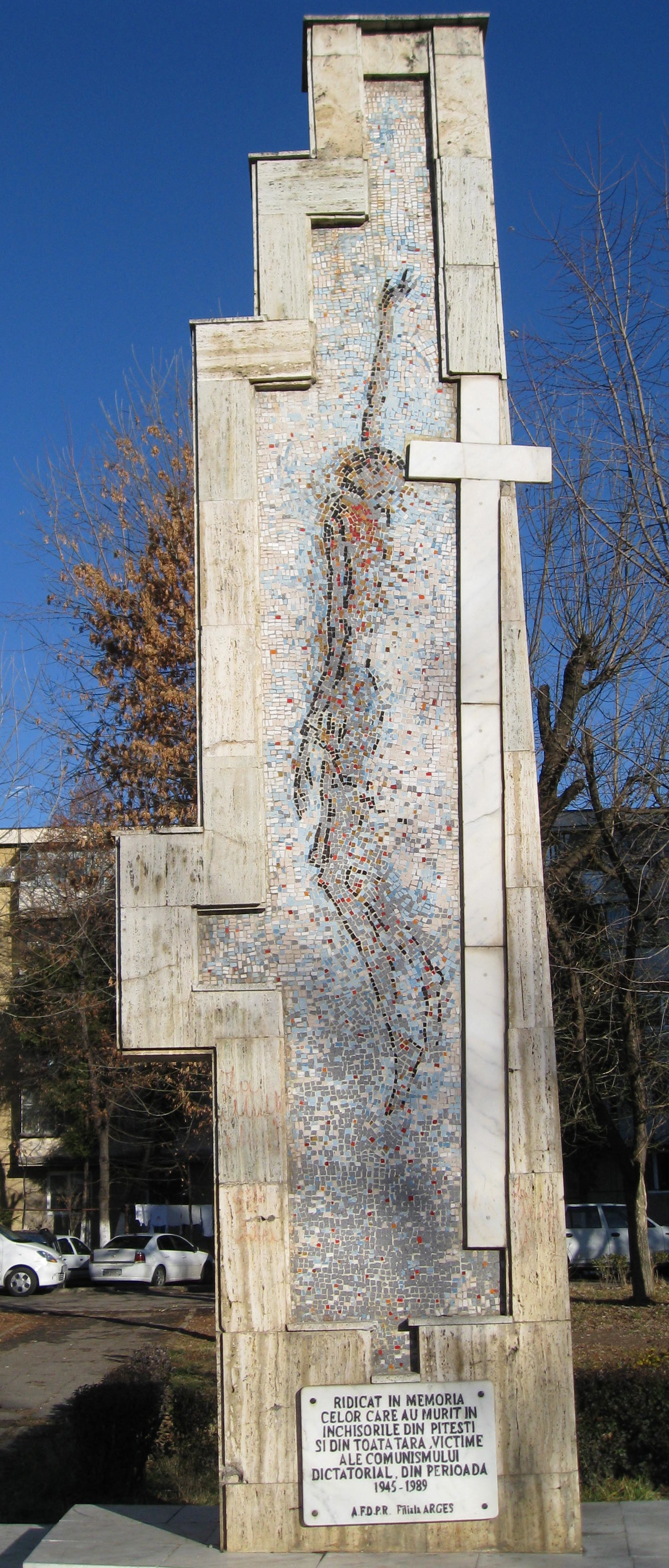
Cross at the memorial to the Pitești Experiment

Țurcanu was first imprisoned at Suceava. There, a group of prisoners detained for their past Iron Guard sympathies, led by Alexandru Bogdanovici, started various initiatives meant to win the favour of the Communist authorities. Among these was the preparation of a memorial addressed to the party leadership promising a full cessation of political activity in exchange for their release, and the founding (with Țurcanu's involvement) at the beginning of 1949 of Organizația Deținuților cu Convingeri Comuniste (ODCC, "Organization of Convinced Communist Detainees").

=== Pitești Prison ===
Țurcanu was transferred to Pitești Prison on 22 April 1949 and, once there, tried to attract the notice of prison director Alexandru Dumitrescu, with whom he only managed to speak at the beginning of June, when the latter was inspecting cells. After discussions with him, Țurcanu was recruited as an informer to the prison management, in the process benefiting from a much more favourable treatment than that accorded to ordinary prisoners: extra food, freedom of movement inside the prison, etc. He coordinated with the local Securitate officer, Ion Marina; in turn, Marina was in constant communication with Iosif Nemeș, the chief of the Operations Service, and with Colonel Tudor Sepeanu, the head of Inspection Services at the Securitate's Directorate for Penitentiaries.

During the summer of 1949 Țurcanu identified, with the help of his collaborators, those detainees who served as leaders or role models for the others; the prison administration isolated these men in a separate section. The idea of applying violent treatments on prisoners appeared after discussions with director Dumitrescu in November 1949. Subsequently, Țurcanu directly participated in the beatings of several hundred detainees. Many of these were nearly killed as a result of the beatings administered by Țurcanu and his accomplices. One of his victims was Constantin Oprișan, who was cruelly beaten dozens of times by Țurcanu.

One of his victims later remembered Țurcanu as:

"...a handsome man, out of the ordinary...with brown hair tending toward blond...when he frowned, you were terrified...his well-proportioned body seemed that of a performance athlete. When he punched or slapped you, he knocked you to the ground. When he got mad he was so crude that he destroyed everything in his path, like a ferocious killer. Moreover, he was unusually intelligent and had an extraordinary memory... but he was so Satanized you didn't know what to think of him..."

During a June 1954 interrogation, Țurcanu described some of the torture methods he used at Pitești Prison: beatings

"on the soles of the feet, on the buttocks, on the back muscles of the legs, on the palms, over the face with the palms and the strap, over the face and under the sternum, choking the throat by hand. The beating was applied for about 10 minutes, which was repeated if necessary." Other methods included "rubbing the cement floor for 1 to 2 hours, standing for half a day, hitting the head against the wall."

On 18 August 1951 Țurcanu was transferred to Gherla Prison, where he continued his activity as torturer on a reduced scale until that December. On 19 December he was transferred to Jilava Prison.

== Murder trial ==
Țurcanu and his group of torturers were tried in September–November 1954. The lead judge was Alexandru Petrescu, who also presided at the trials of Iuliu Maniu and the Danube-Black Sea Canal saboteurs. The indictment, drawn up by a military prosecutor, claimed that the activities of the accused came about following an initiative by Horia Sima. His alleged intention was to demonstrate to the West that detainees were mistreated and killed in Communist prisons in order to compromise the regime and the Romanian government. Țurcanu was accused of being the lead of the Câmpulung Frăția de Cruce in 1945, founding the "National Liberal Christian Youth" (Tineretul Național Liberal Creștin), then later, joining the Union of Communist Youth. The indictment recognized that some prisoners died, including Corneliu Niță, Eugen Gavrilescu, Gheorghe Șerban and Gheorghe Vătășoiu, but also Bogdanovici, "who had been subjected to one of the most horrible extermination regimes".

On 10 November 1954, Țurcanu and most of his fellow defendants were sentenced to death. He and sixteen accomplices were shot at Jilava Prison on 17 December, and his death was recorded at Jilava town hall on 5 October 1962. In 1957, the regime partially admitted its own involvement in the Pitești Experiment; their role was imprisoning lower-level officials and employees of the prison, including its director, Dumitrescu. Securitate Colonel Sepeanu was arrested in March 1953 and sentenced to 8 years in April 1957, but was pardoned and set free several months later.

== Bibliography ==
- Bordeianu, Dumitru Gh. (1995). Marcel Petrișor (ed.). Mărturisiri din mlaștina disperării. (Cele văzute, trăite și suferite la Pitești și la Gherla) (in Romanian). Vol. I–II (II ed.). București: Editura Gama.
- Mureșan, Alin (2007). Pitești. Cronica unei sinucideri asistate. Institutul de investigare a crimelor comunismului în România (in Romanian). Iași: Polirom.
- "Final Report" (PDF) (in Romanian). Presidential Commission for the Study of the Communist Dictatorship in Romania. 2006.
