= Pitești Prison =

Former prison in Romania

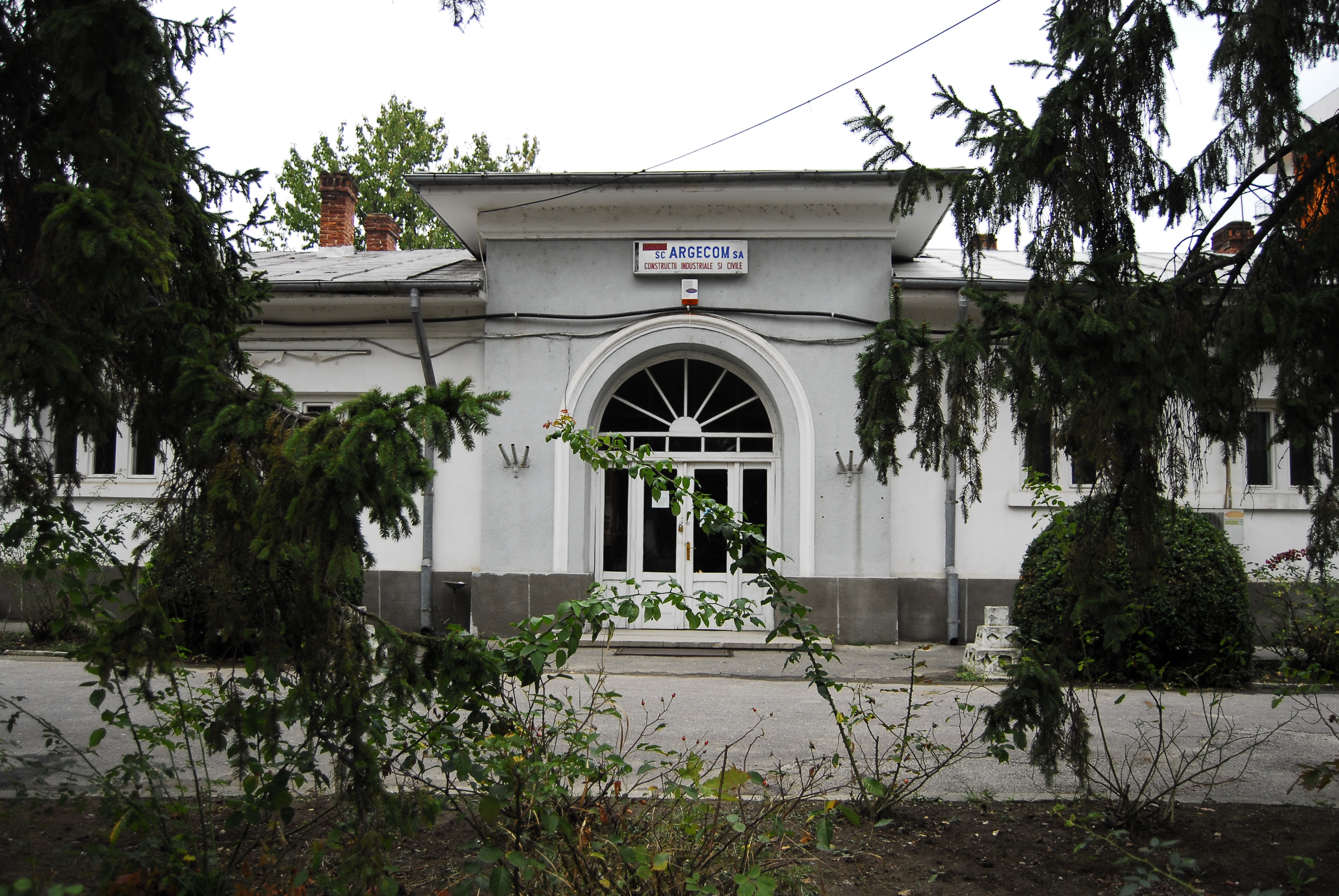
- Entrance to the former prison
- Interactive map of Pitești Prison
- Location: Pitești, Romania; 44.8648791°N 24.8638569°E
- Status: defunct
- Population: Political prisoners
- Opened: 1942
- Closed: 1952
- Director: Alexandru Dumitrescu
- Website: pitestiprison.org

Notable prisoners
- Aristide Blank, Sorin Bottez, Gheorghe Calciu-Dumitreasa, Radu Ciuceanu, Corneliu Coposu, Valeriu Gafencu, Iuliu Hirțea, Ion Ioanid, Nicolae Mărgineanu, Gheorghe Mihail, Ștefan I. Nenițescu, Elisabeta Rizea, Virgil Solomon, Alexandru Todea, Eugen Țurcanu, A. L. Zissu

Pitești Prison (Romanian: Închisoarea Pitești) was a penal facility in Pitești, Romania, best remembered for the reeducation experiment (also known as Experimentul Pitești – the "Pitești Experiment" or Fenomenul Pitești – the "Pitești Phenomenon") which was carried out between December 1949 and September 1951, during Communist party rule. The experiment, which was implemented by a group of prisoners under the guidance of the prison administration, was designed as an attempt to violently "reeducate" the mostly young political prisoners, who were primarily supporters of the fascist Iron Guard, as well as Zionist members of the Romanian Jewish community. The Romanian People's Republic adhered to a doctrine of state atheism and the inmates who were held at Pitești Prison included religious believers, such as Christian seminarians. According to writer Romulus Rusan, the experiment's goal was to re-educate prisoners to discard past religious convictions and ideology, and, eventually, to alter their personalities to the point of absolute obedience. Estimates for the total number of people who passed through the experiment range from at least 780 to up to 1,000, to 2,000, to 5,000. Journalists Laurențiu Dologa and Laurențiu Ionescu estimate almost 200 inmates died at Pitești, while historian Mircea Stănescu accounts for 22 deaths during the period, 16 of them with documented participation in the "re-education".

After the purging of Romanian Communist Party leader Ana Pauker, the experiment was halted because the Romanian communist regime was sidelining its hardline Stalinist leaders. The overseers were put on trial; while twenty of the participating prisoners were sentenced to death, prison officials were given light sentences.

Journalist and anti-communist activist Virgil Ierunca referred to the "reeducation experiment" as the largest and most intensive brainwashing torture program in the Eastern Bloc. In even stronger terms, Nobel Laureate and Gulag survivor Aleksandr Solzhenitsyn called it "the most terrible act of barbarism in the contemporary world". Ex-detainee Gheorghe Boldur-Lățescu has described the Pitești Experiment as being "unique in the history of crimes against humanity".

Researcher Monica Ciobanu noted that, as part of the Romanian post-communist politics and the trend to reincorporate a nationalist ideology within anti-communist rhetoric, the conservative right wing views the victims in Pitești as martyrs and heroes. Religious organisations, such the Romanian Orthodox Church and former dissidents and civic organisations also share the views. This trend was criticized by the Elie Wiesel National Institute and scholars of the Holocaust in Romania.

== History ==
=== Beginnings ===
The prison itself was built at an earlier stage. Work on it had begun in 1937, under King Carol II, and was completed in 1941, during Ion Antonescu's rule. At the time, it was the most modern detention facility in Romania. Located at the northern edge of Pitești, the building was structured on four levels: basement, ground floor, and two upper floors, arranged in a T-shaped design. The first political prisoners it housed arrived in 1942; these were high school students suspected of having taken part in the Legionnaires' rebellion. For a while after the proclamation of the Romanian People's Republic in December 1947, it continued to house primarily those found guilty of misdemeanors. Shortly after the establishment of the Securitate in August 1948, the Pitești Prison became a detention center for university students. By April 1949, the director of Pitești Prison was Alexandru Dumitrescu.

According to Rusan, early attempts at "reeducation" had occurred at the prison in Suceava, continuing in a violent manner in Pitești and, less violently, at the Gherla Prison. The group of overseers had been formed from people who had themselves been arrested and found guilty of political crimes. Their leader, Eugen Țurcanu, a prisoner and former member of the Iron Guard, who had also shortly joined the Communist Party before being purged, dissatisfied with the progress in Suceava, proposed using violent means in order to enhance the process, obtaining the agreement of the Pitești prison administration. Țurcanu, who was probably acting on the orders of Securitate deputy chief Alexandru Nikolski, selected a tight unit of reeducation survivors as his assistants in carrying out political tasks. This group was called the Organizația Deținuților cu Convingeri Comuniste (ODCC, "Organisation of Detainees with Communist Beliefs"), and included the future Orthodox priest and dissident Gheorghe Calciu-Dumitreasa and the Jewish detainee Petrică Fux.

=== Stages of "reeducation" ===
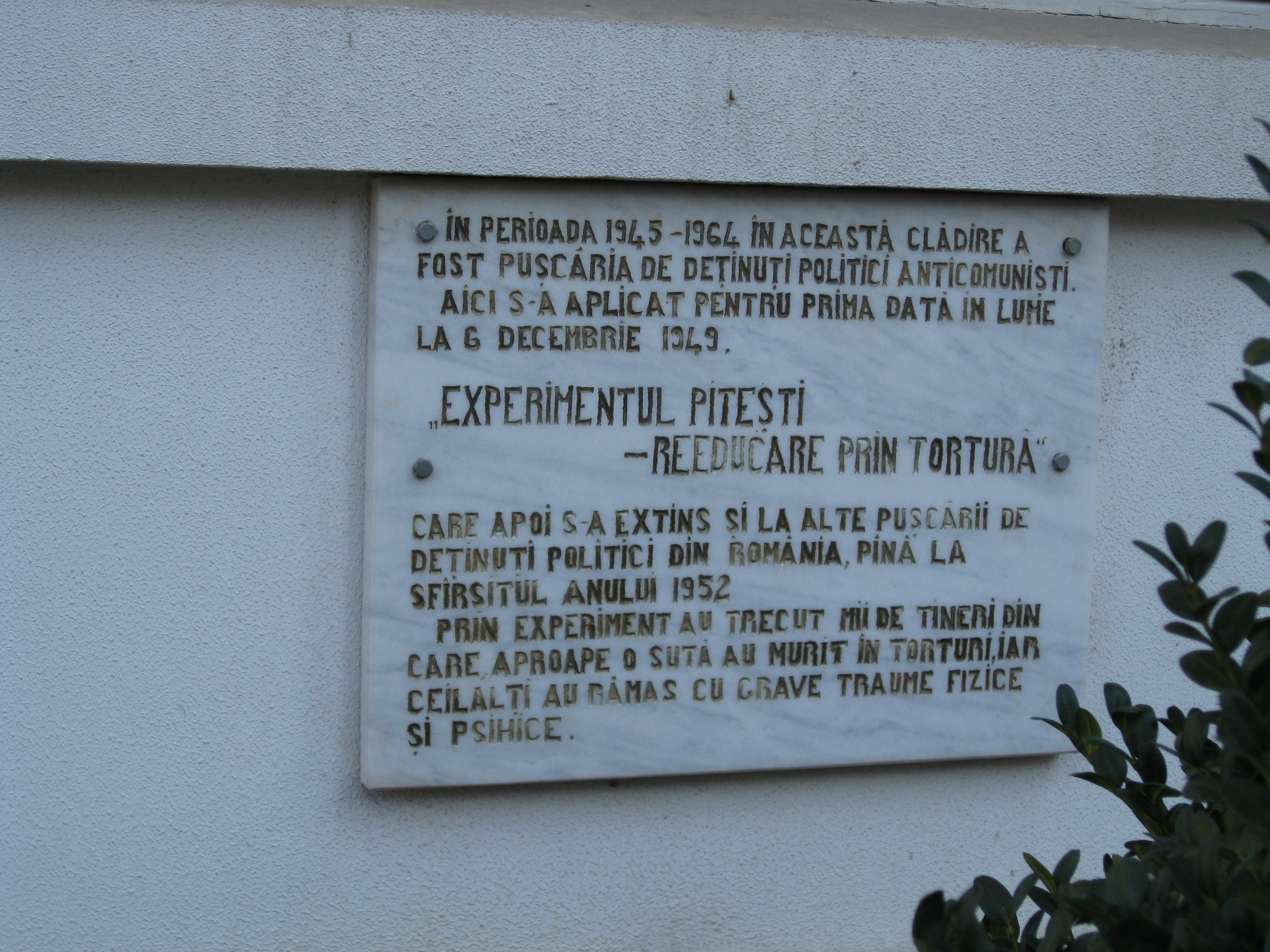
Memorial plaque at the prison's entrance

According to writers Ruxandra Cesereanu and Romulus Rusan the process begun in 1949 involved psychological punishment (mainly through humiliation) and physical torture. Initially the director of the prison, Dumitrescu, was not in favor of reeducation; he changed course, however, after Ion Marina, the local representative of the Securitate, applied pressure on him. Marina was closely coordinating with the leadership of the Directorate for Penitentiaries, particularly with Iosif Nemeș, the chief of the Operations Service, and with Tudor Sepeanu, the head of Inspection Services.

Detainees, who were subject to regular and severe beatings, were required to engage in torturing each other, with the goal of discouraging past loyalties. Guards would force them to attend scheduled or ad-hoc political instruction sessions, on topics such as dialectical materialism and Joseph Stalin's History of the Communist Party of the Soviet Union (Bolsheviks), usually accompanied by random violence and encouraged delation (demascare, lit. "unmasking") for various real or invented misdemeanors. According to a former participant in the "reeducation", on occasion, the director of the prison, Dumitrescu, would personally engage in those beatings.

==== First stage ====
Each subject of the experiment was initially thoroughly interrogated, with torture applied as a mean to expose intimate details of his life ("external unmasking"). Hence, they were required to reveal everything they were thought to have hidden from previous interrogations; hoping to escape torture, many prisoners would confess to imaginary misdeeds.

==== Second stage ====
The second phase, "internal unmasking," required the tortured to reveal the names of those who had behaved less brutally or with relative indulgence to them in detention.

==== Third stage ====
Public humiliation was also enforced, usually at the third stage ("public moral unmasking"), inmates were forced to denounce all their personal beliefs, loyalties, and values. Notably, religious inmates had to blaspheme religious symbols and sacred texts.

=== Torture methods ===
According to Virgil Ierunca (an anti-communist activist and member of the Presidential Commission for the Study of the Communist Dictatorship in Romania), Christian baptism was gruesomely mocked. Guards chanted baptismal rites as buckets of urine and fecal matter were brought to inmates. The inmate's head was pushed into the raw sewage; their head would remain submerged almost to the point of death. The head was then raised, the inmate allowed to breathe, only to have their head pushed back into the sewage.

Ierunca further states that the prisoners' whole bodies were burned with cigarettes; their buttocks would begin to rot, and their skin fell off as though they suffered from leprosy. Others were forced to swallow spoons of excrement, and when they threw it back up, they were forced to eat their own vomit. The inmates were required to accept the notion that their own family members had various criminal and grotesque features; they were required to author false autobiographies, comprising accounts of deviant behavior. Any prisoner who refused to become a perpetrator or who did not beat a former friend mercilessly was crushed by Țurcanu’s most brutal assistants — Steiner, Gherman, Pătrășcanu, Roșca, and Oprea.

In addition to physical violence, inmates subject to "reeducation" were supposed to work for exhausting periods doing humiliating chores – for instance, cleaning the floor with a rag clenched between the teeth. Inmates were malnourished and kept in degrading and unsanitary conditions.

Not able to resist the physical and psychological violence, some prisoners tried to commit suicide by severing their veins. Two of the inmates, Gheorghe Șerban and Gheorghe Vătășoiu, ended their lives by throwing themselves through the opening between the stairways, before safety nets were installed. Many died from injuries sustained during beatings and torture. Alexandru Bogdanovici, one of the initiators of the reeducation process at Suceava, was repeatedly tortured until his death in April 1950.

=== Origin ===
Historian Adrian Cioroianu argued that techniques used by the ODCC could have been ultimately derived from Anton Makarenko's controversial pedagogy and penology principles in respect to rehabilitation. Such connection was however disputed by historian Mihai Demetriade, who noted that similar cases of extreme violence within imprisoned Iron Guard groups existed before the advent of the communist regime. Literary critic Arleen Ionescu argues that, "although Makarenko's and Țurcanu's projects of engineering a New Man show structural analogies, the texture of the experience was very different."

=== Selection for labor camps ===
The prison also ensured a preliminary selection for the labor camps at the Danube–Black Sea Canal, Ocnele Mari, and other sites, where squads of former inmates were supposed to extend the experiment.

=== Ending and legacy ===
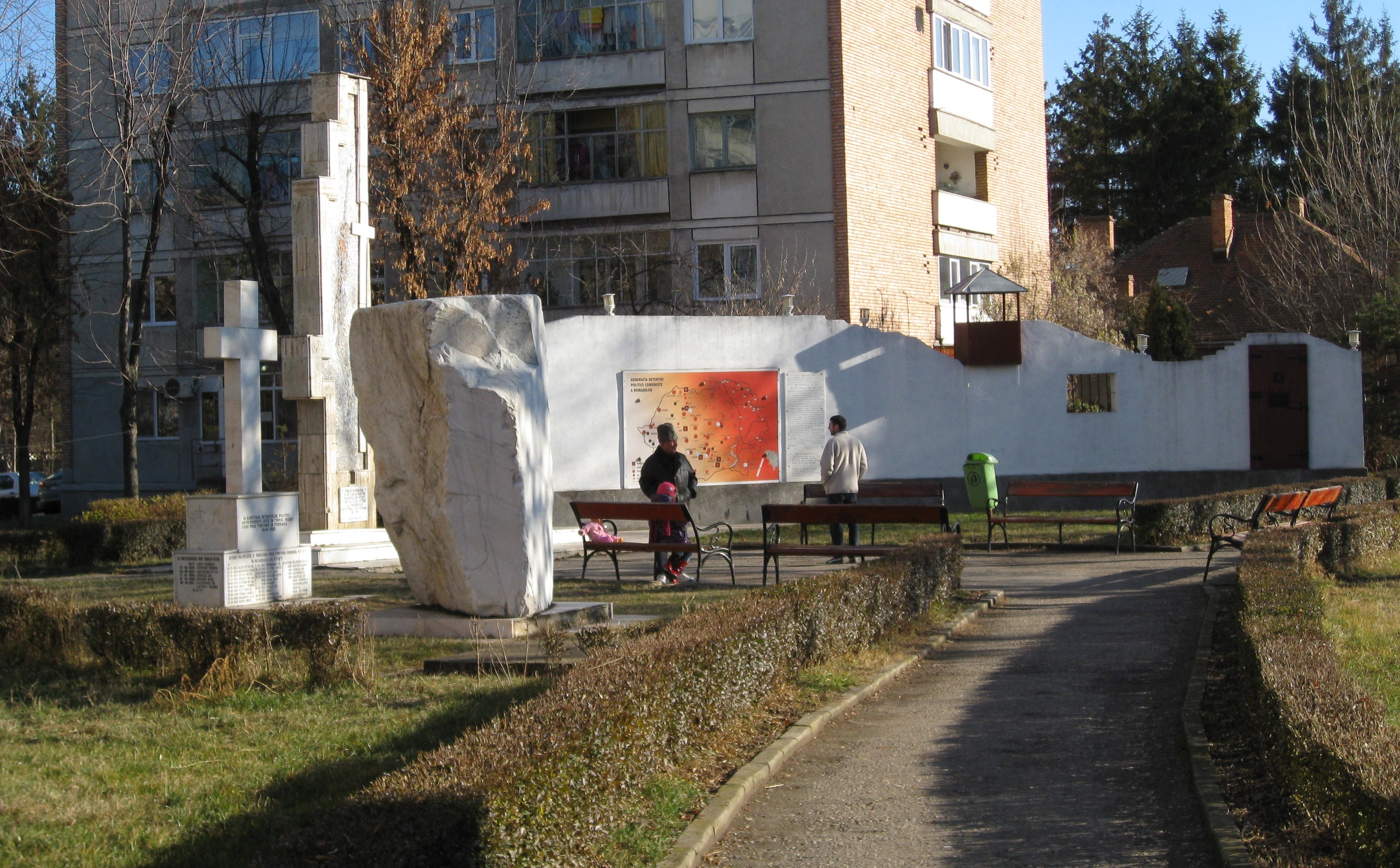
Pitești Prison monument

In 1952, as Gheorghe Gheorghiu-Dej successfully maneuvered against the Minister of the Interior, Teohari Georgescu, the process was stopped by the authorities themselves. The ODCC secretly faced trial for abuse, and over twenty death sentences were handed out on 10 November 1954. Țurcanu was held responsible for the murder of 30 prisoners, and the abuse exercised on 780 others. He and sixteen accomplices were executed by firing squad on 17 December at Jilava Prison. Securitate officials who had overseen the experiment were tried the following year; all were given light sentences, and were freed soon after. Colonel Sepeanu was arrested in March 1953 and sentenced to 8 years on 16 April 1957, but was pardoned and set free on 13 November of that year. Responding to new ideological guidelines, the court concluded that the experiment had been the result of successful infiltration by American and Horia Sima's Iron Guard agents into the Securitate, with the goal of discrediting Romanian law enforcement.

In the early 1980s, several apartment blocks were constructed on an area covering about a third of the prison courtyard; part of the old prison wall was left standing on the northwestern side. Abandoned and partially in ruin, the prison building was sold to a construction firm in 1991, after the Revolution of 1989; several of the facilities have either been torn down or underwent major changes. A memorial was built in front of the prison's entrance.

According to the Romanian historian Mircea Stănescu, tens of people died in the "Pitești experiment"; its aim was not to kill the inmates, but to "reeducate" them. For a 2017 art exhibit at the former Pitești Prison, artist Cătălin Bădărău sculpted contorted figures lying in the hallways or in the cells; one figure stood awkwardly on his head, others had their hands tied behind their backs or were covering their faces. According to Bădărău, "They were strong people when they went into prison but they came out physical wrecks. But conversely, they became spiritual giants."

The prison was turned into a museum in 2014 with the help of private funding and was designated a historic monument in 2023. The Romanian government has nominated the facility, along with four other prisons used during the communist era, to be included as UNESCO World Heritage Sites.

== Inmates ==
- Aristide Blank
- Sorin Bottez
- Roman Braga
- Gheorghe Calciu-Dumitreasa
- Ștefan Cârjan
- Radu Cioculescu
- Radu Ciuceanu
- Corneliu Coposu
- Valeriu Gafencu
- Iuliu Hirțea
- Ion Ioanid
- Ioan Ianolide
- Nicolae Mărgineanu
- Gheorghe Mihail
- Ștefan I. Nenițescu
- Constantin Oprișan
- Petre Pandrea
- Elisabeta Rizea
- Constantin Rodas
- Virgil Solomon
- Alexandru Todea
- Eugen Țurcanu
- A. L. Zissu

== See also ==
- Memorial of the Victims of Communism and of the Resistance
- Re-education in Communist Romania
- Romanian anti-communist resistance movement
