= Ilovăț =

- Commune
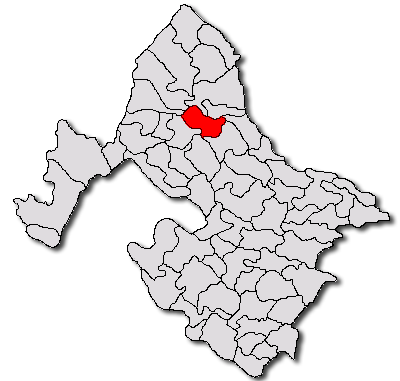
- Location in Mehedinți County

- Location in Romania
- Coordinates: 44°49′N 22°46′E
- Country: Romania
- County: Mehedinți
- Population (2021-12-01): 1,015
- Time zone: EET/EEST (UTC+2/+3)
- Vehicle reg.: MH

Ilovăț is a commune located in Mehedinți County, Oltenia, Romania. It is composed of six villages: Budănești, Cracu Lung, Dâlbocița, Firizu, Ilovăț and Racova.
