= Baia Sprie =

- Town
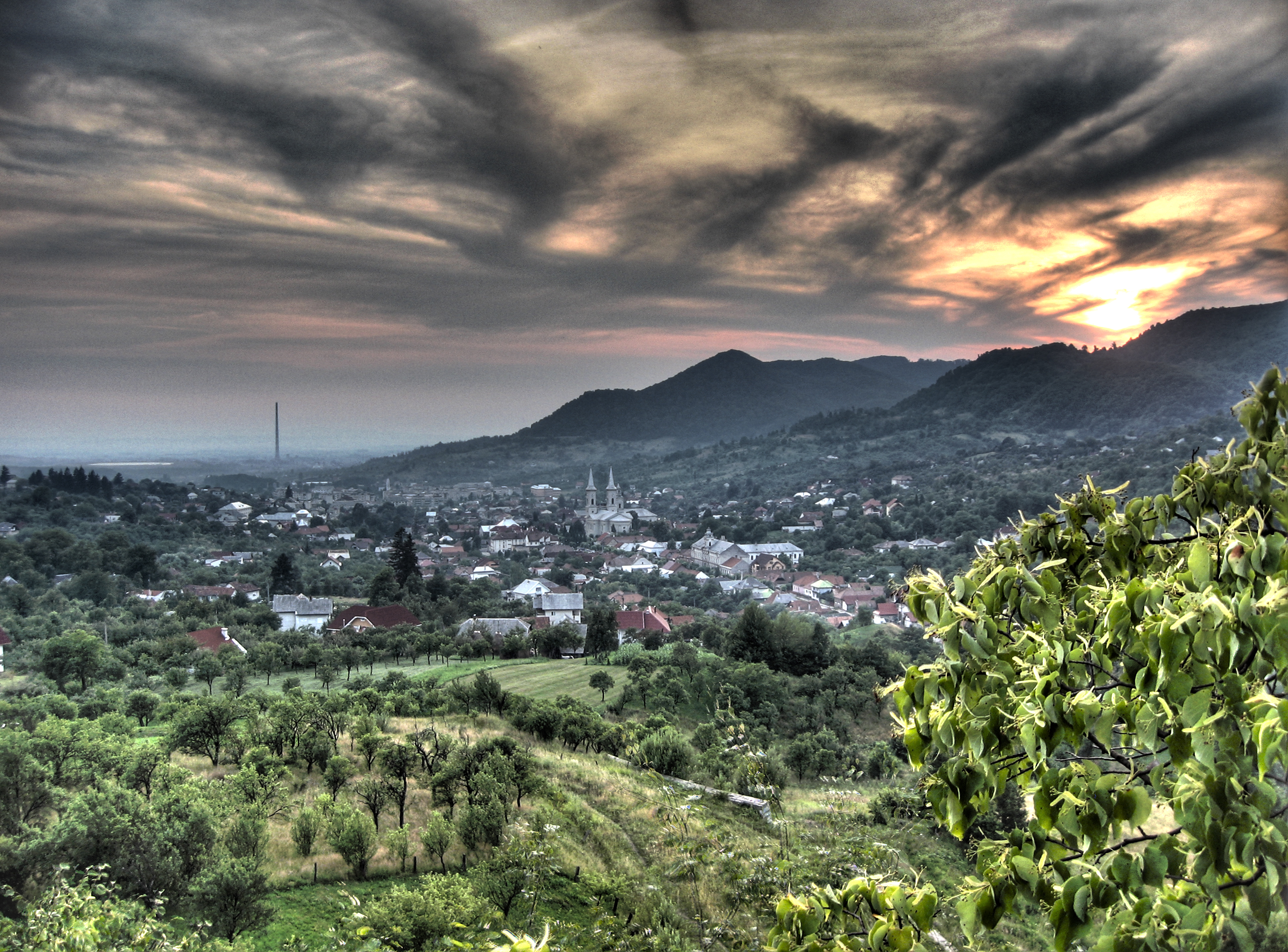

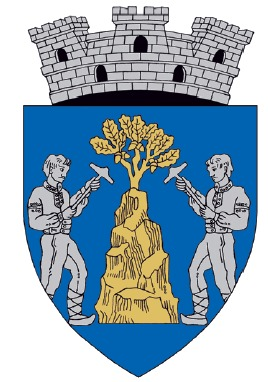
- Flag Coat of arms

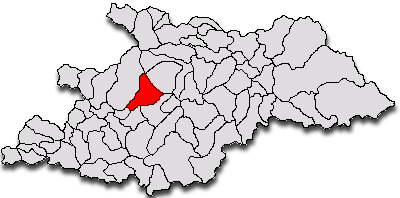
- Location in Maramureș County

- Location in Romania
- Coordinates: 47°39′33″N 23°42′15″E
- Country: Romania
- County: Maramureș

Government
  - Mayor (2024–2028): Sebastian Alin Bîrda (PNL)
- Area: 96 km^{2} (37 sq mi)
- Elevation: 500 m (1,600 ft)
- Population (2021-12-01): 14,329
  - Density: 150/km^{2} (390/sq mi)
- Time zone: UTC+02:00 (EET)
  - Summer (DST): UTC+03:00 (EEST)
- Postal code: 435100
- Area code: (+40) 02 62
- Vehicle reg.: MM
- Website: www.baiasprie.ro

Baia Sprie (Romanian pronunciation: [ˌbaja ˈspri.e]; Hungarian: Felsőbánya, German: Mittelstadt) is a town in Maramureș County, northern Romania. Baia Sprie is situated at a distance of 9 km (5.6 mi) from Baia Mare and belongs to the Baia Mare metropolitan area.

The town administers three villages: Chiuzbaia (Kisbánya), Satu Nou de Sus (Felsőújfalu), and Tăuții de Sus (Giródtótfalu). Neighbouring communities are the city of Baia Mare and the communes Groși, Dumbrăvița, Șisești, and Desești.

The town was one of the most important mining centers in north-western Romania, exploitation of gold and silver being mentioned in documents written in the Middle Ages, during the time when the Saxons colonized the region. However, recent administrative changes and restructuring of the Romanian mining industry brought this activity to an almost complete halt.

== History ==
The first written mention of the settlement dates back to 1329 as "Civitas in medio monte", in 1406 as "civitas Medii Montis", in 1390, 1452, 1455 as "civitas Felsevbanya", and since 1523 as Felsőbánya. The old Romanian name of the town was Baia de Sus, which means "Upper Mine", same as in Hungarian.

The town was in Szatmár County, in the Kingdom of Hungary. King Sigismund, Holy Roman Emperor, as part of treaty with Serbian ruler Despotus Stefan Lazarević, gave him Baia Sprie as a gift in 1411, until Lazarević' death in 1427. A year later, Lazarević's successor, Despotus Đurađ Branković of Serbia, became lord of Baia Sprie. In 1567, Baia Sprie was annexed by János Zsigmond, Prince of Transylvania. In 1605–1606, 1621–1629, and 1645–1648, the town and the county were part of the Principality of Transylvania.

The 1850 census, conducted in German, recorded 5,427 inhabitants, representing 1,336 families living in 993 houses. As for the nationalities existing at that time, the Hungarians numbered 3,800, Romanians 1,093, Germans 333, Slovaks 140, and Roma 40. In the 1910 census, the following languages were spoken in the township: Hungarian language 93.8%, Romanian language 5.2%, and others 1.0%. At the same census, the following religions were represented: Roman Catholic 52.1%, Greek Catholic 28.1%, Calvinist 13.3%, Judaism 6.1%, and others 0.5%.

After the collapse of Austria-Hungary at the end of World War I and the declaration of the Union of Transylvania with Romania, the Romanian Army took control of the area in the spring of 1919, during the Hungarian–Romanian War. The town officially became part of the Kingdom of Romania in June 1920 under the terms of the Treaty of Trianon which ceded the territory from Hungary. In August 1940, the Second Vienna Award, arbitrated by Germany and Italy, reassigned the territory of Northern Transylvania (which included Baia Sprie) from Romania to Hungary. Towards the end of World War II, however, the town was taken back from Hungarian and German troops by Romanian and Soviet forces in October 1944. The township belonged alternately to the Baia Mare Region (in 1950–1960), Maramureș Region (1960–1968) and, as of 1968, Maramureș County. In the early 1950s, a communist prison camp operated at the mine.

== Population ==
Historical population
Year	Pop.	±%
1880	6,881	—
1900	6,813	−1.0%
1910	4,422	−35.1%
1930	4,127	−6.7%
1941	7,167	+73.7%
1948	3,968	−44.6%
1956	8,134	+105.0%
1966	13,182	+62.1%
1977	15,554	+18.0%
1992	16,059	+3.2%
2002	15,735	−2.0%
2011	14,971	−4.9%
2021	14,329	−4.3%
Source: Census data

At the 2021 census, Baia Sprie had a population of 14,329, of which 68.52% were Romanians, 11.67% Hungarians, and 2.09% Roma. At the 2011 census, the town had 14,971 inhabitants; of those, 77.9% were Romanians, 17.3% Hungarians, and 4.2% Roma. The main religious groups in 2002 were 11,344 Romanian Orthodox, 2,739 Roman Catholic, 886 Calvinist, and 636 Greek Catholic.
