= Beștepe, Tulcea =

Beștepe
- Commune
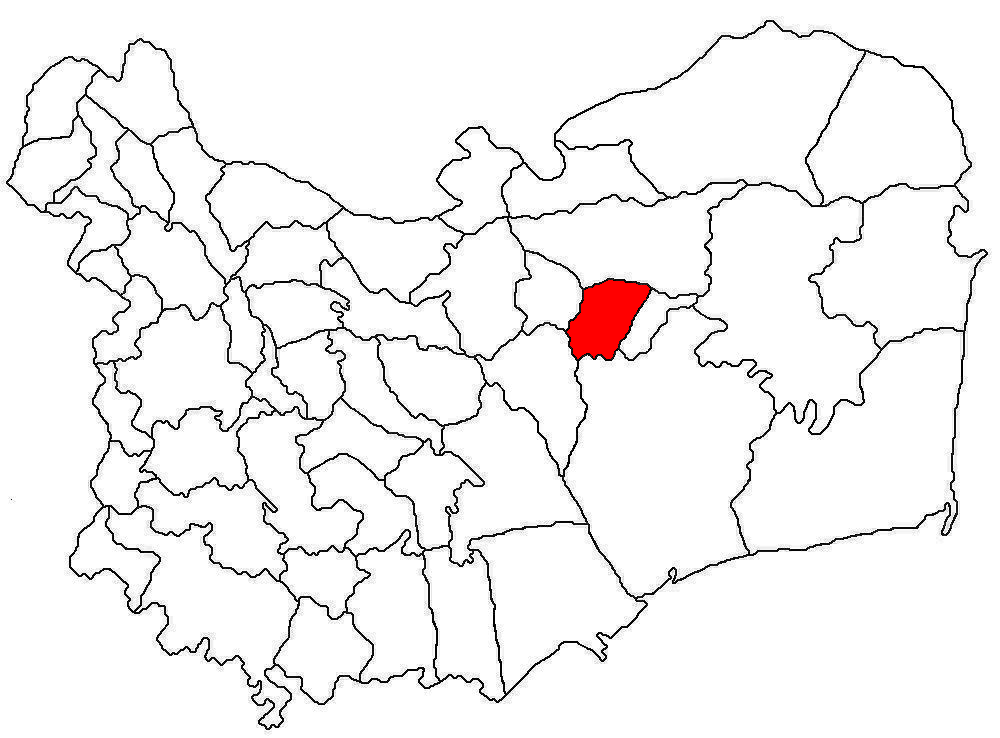
- Location in Tulcea County

- Location in Romania
- Coordinates: 45°5′N 29°1′E
- Country: Romania
- County: Tulcea

Government
  - Mayor (2020–2024): Dumitru Țipirigan (PSD)
- Area: 64.23 km^{2} (24.80 sq mi)
- Population (2021-12-01): 1,510
  - Density: 23.5/km^{2} (60.9/sq mi)
- Time zone: UTC+02:00 (EET)
  - Summer (DST): UTC+03:00 (EEST)
- Vehicle reg.: TL
- Website: www.primariabestepe.ro

Beștepe (Romanian pronunciation: [ˈbeʃtepe]) is a commune in Tulcea County, Northern Dobruja, Romania. Its name comes from Turkish, meaning "five hills/peaks" (beş – five, tepe – hill/peak), due to a chain of hills which lie nearby.

In 2004, the commune was established via a local referendum by separation from the Mahmudia commune.

The Beștepe commune includes 3 villages:

- Beștepe
- Băltenii de Sus (Carasuhatu de Sus until 1964)
- Băltenii de Jos (Carasuhatu de Jos until 1964)
