= Cavnic =

- Town
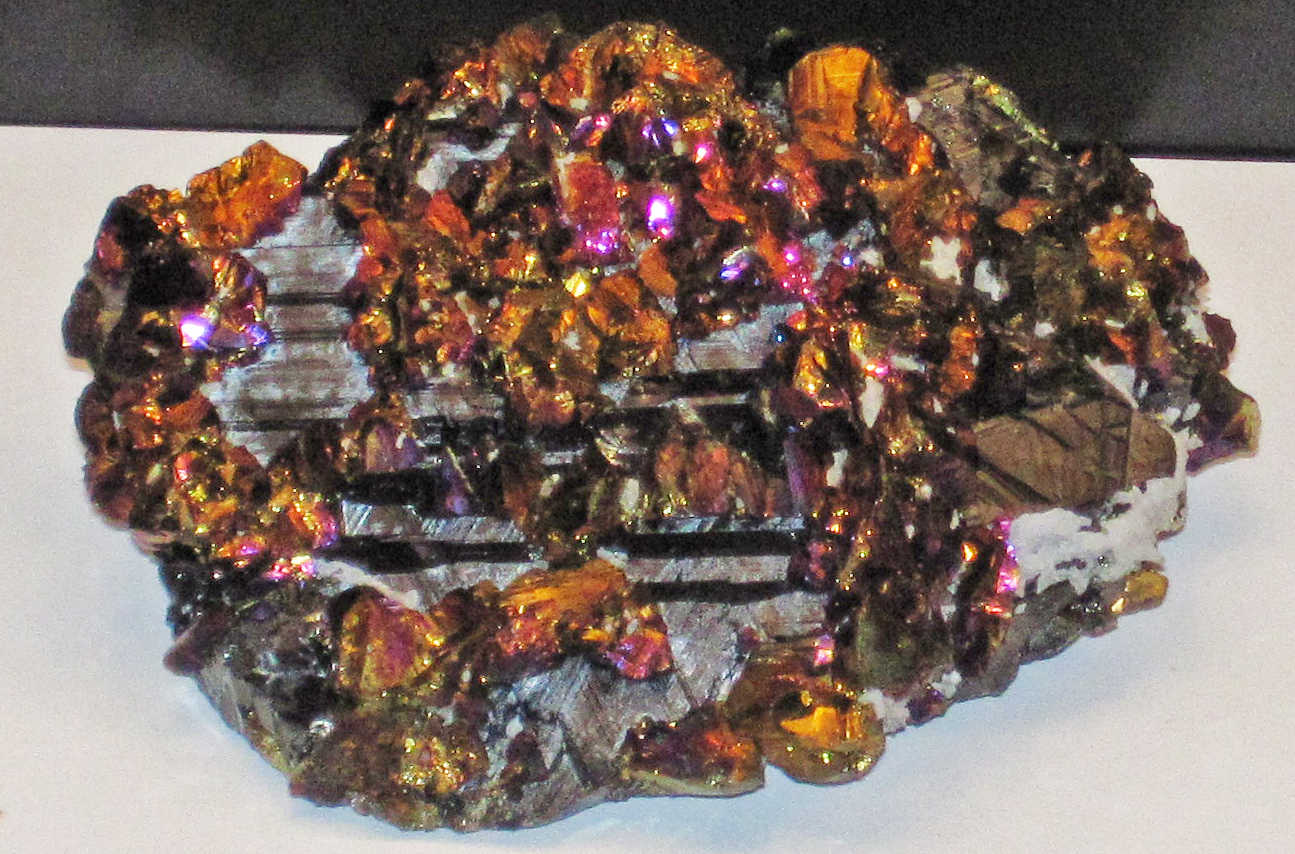
- Chalcopyrite on sphalerite, Boldut Mine, Cavnic, Carnegie Museum of Natural History specimen CM27849

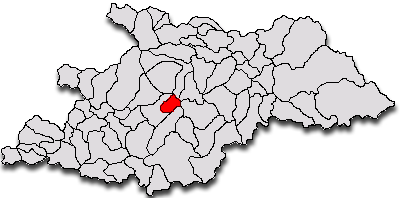
- Location in Maramureș County

- Location in Romania
- Coordinates: 47°39′39″N 23°52′40″E
- Country: Romania
- County: Maramureș

Government
  - Mayor (2024–2028): Vladimir Petruț (PNL)
- Area: 47.17 km^{2} (18.21 sq mi)
- Elevation: 760 m (2,490 ft)
- Highest elevation: 1,500 m (4,900 ft)
- Lowest elevation: 500 m (1,600 ft)
- Population (2021-12-01): 4,264
  - Density: 90.40/km^{2} (234.1/sq mi)
- Time zone: UTC+02:00 (EET)
  - Summer (DST): UTC+03:00 (EEST)
- Postal code: 435000
- Area code: +40-(0)262
- Vehicle reg.: MM
- Website: cavnic.ro

Cavnic (Hungarian: Kapnikbánya; German: Kapnik) is a former mining town located in the valley of the river Cavnic, 26 km (16 mi) east of Baia Mare, in Maramureș County, northern Romania. Part of the Baia Mare metropolitan area, the town covers 47.17 km^{2} (18 sq mi), at altitudes ranging from 500 to 1,050 m (1,640 to 3,440 ft) above sea level.

== History ==
Historical population
| Year | Pop. | ±% |
|---|---|---|
| 1880 | 3,320 | — |
| 1900 | 4,665 | +40.5% |
| 1910 | 3,517 | −24.6% |
| 1930 | 2,262 | −35.7% |
| 1956 | 3,982 | +76.0% |
| 1977 | 6,033 | +51.5% |
| 1992 | 5,778 | −4.2% |
| 2002 | 5,494 | −4.9% |
| 2011 | 4,862 | −11.5% |
| 2021 | 4,264 | −12.3% |
Source: Census data

Cavnic was first documented in 1336, as Capnic. It was named after the river, which got its name from a Slavic word, kopanе, which refers to digging. Mining activity in the area dates back to the Roman age.

The town was destroyed by the Ottomans in 1460 and by the Tatars in 1717, but the Tatar invasion ended with their defeat from the people of Cavnic, making from it the last Tatar invasion to ever take place in the current territory of Romania. As a proof of the last Tatar invasion, the town hosts a 7.2 m (24 ft) tall obelisk on which a Latin inscription states "Anno 1717 usque hic fuerunt tartari" meaning "During the year 1717 the Tatars arrived here". The obelisk is known among locals as "Tatar Pole" or "Written Rock". The exact date when the obelisk was built is currently unknown.

In the 1910 Census of the Kingdom of Hungary, Kapnikbánya (as it was then called) was in Szatmár County, Nagybánya district. It then had a population of 3,517, out of which 1,864 were Hungarians, 1,604 were Romanians, and 49 were Germans. 1,497 identified as Catholic, 1,890 as Greek Catholic, and 89 as Jewish.

The town's mines tended to close and reopen, often not remaining operational for any great length of time. In the 1970s, however, Cavnic underwent a great deal of development. Two ski slopes were built at Icoana, and the town gained motels, boardinghouses and a hotel to take advantage of its touristic potential.

It appears that one of the oldest inscriptions ever found in European mines has been uncovered in Voievod Gallery belonging to the former town's mine. The inscription states "Hier hats erschlagen Iacob Huber" ("Here was killed Iacob Huber"). The text, dated 1511, was most likely written to commemorate a mining accident.

At the 2011 Romanian census, Cavnic had 4,862 residents, of whom 4,026 were Romanians (82.8%), 705 Hungarians (14.5%), 28 Roma, 4 Germans, and 97 others. At the 2021 census, the town had population of 4,264, of which 81.85% were Romanians and 7.13% Hungarians.

== Notable people ==
- Ignaz von Born, geologist, was born here on December 26, 1742.
- Jenő Jendrassik, Hungarian professor and philosopher, was born here in 1824.
- Simon Papp, Hungarian geologist, was born here on February 14, 1886.

== Winter sports ==
Following the permanent closure of its underground mineral extraction shafts in the early 2000s, Cavnic underwent a profound economic reorientation, shifting from a declining industrial center into a regional resort for winter tourism. Benefiting from a microclimate within the Gutâi Mountains, the town experiences a high number of days with natural snow coverage per year, earning it the regional moniker of the "snow capital" of Maramureș.

The modernized ski area is divided into two interconnected sectors, known as the "Roata" and "Icoana" ski areas, located at the eastern exit of the town toward Ocna Șugatag. These areas feature a total of 8.5 kilometers of slopes positioned at altitudes ranging from 950 meters to 1,260 meters above sea level.

The Roata sector is the larger of the two areas, incorporating multiple slopes equipped with ski lifts, artificial snow cannons, and night lighting that extends operating hours into the evening. The nearby Icoana sector offers a more family-oriented recreational environment, operating medium-difficulty ski slopes such as Icoana 1 and Icoana 2.

Local private investors have opened guesthouses, hotels and specialized ski rental shops adjacent to the base stations. In order to ensure local income during the summer months, alternative attractions have been introduced, including a synthetic dry ski slope and a 272-meter-long alpine toboggan run.
