= Ion Gavrilă Ogoranu =

Romanian fascist and anticommunist fighter

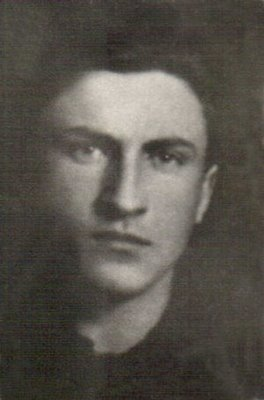
- Born: January 6, 1923; Gura Văii, Făgăraș County, Kingdom of Romania
- Died: May 1, 2006 (aged 83); Galtiu, Alba County, Romania
- Education: Radu Negru High School
- Organization: Iron Guard
- Known for: Leader of the anti-communist resistance group Grupul Carpatin Făgărășan (1948–1955)
- Spouse: Ana Săbăduș (until 2006)

Ion Gavrilă Ogoranu (January 6, 1923 – May 1, 2006) was a member of the fascist paramilitary organization Iron Guard, who between 1948 and 1955, after the Soviet occupation of Romania and the establishment of the Romanian People's Republic, became the leader of an underground anti-communist paramilitary group in the Făgăraș Mountains.

== Biography ==
Ogoranu was born in a Greek-Catholic Romanian family as one of three children, in Gura Văii, Făgăraș County, in the Țara Făgărașului region of southeastern Transylvania. He studied at Radu Negru High School in Făgăraș, where he became a member of the local Iron Guard youth wing, a so-called "Brotherhood of the Cross" - the Frăția de Cruce "Negoiu" - between 1936 and 1940. In 1940 he became the leader of the Frăția de Cruce organization in Făgăraș. In 1941 he was arrested by the Ion Antonescu regime for his participation in the Legionnaires' rebellion and was condemned to ten years forced labor. Released on April 19, 1944, he enrolled in the military school in Câmpulung.

After the end of World War II, Ogoranu attended classes at the Department of Agronomy, University of Cluj and the Commercial Academy in Brașov. He then became involved in fascist and anti-communist activities in Cluj. For seven years (1948–1955), he led the anti-communist resistance formation "Grupul Carpatin Făgărășan", consisting of 25–30 members active on the northern slopes of the Făgăraș Mountains. His group tried to establish contact with the resistance formations active on the southern side of the mountains, especially the groups led by Colonel Gheorghe Arsenescu and by Toma Arnăuțoiu, but those overtures were not met with success. For his activities, Ogoranu was sentenced in absentia to 19 years in prison and, later, in 1951, to death. In May 1954 he was wounded in a fight with the authorities. In 1955, the Securitate secret police killed or captured several members of his group, either through direct conflict or through denunciations. Those captured were tried in 1957. Ion Chiujdea, Laurian Haṣu, Gheorghe Haṣu, Victor Metea, Nelu Novac, Ion Pop, Olimpiu Borzea, and Nicolae Burlacu were sentenced to death by firing squad; the last two had their sentences commuted to forced labor for life.

For 29 years, Ogoranu evaded capture by the Securitate. Most of the time he hid in Galtiu, a village in Sântimbru commune, Alba County. He stayed at the house of Ana Săbăduș, the widow of a political prisoner who had died at Gherla Prison in 1952; she later became his wife. After 26 years on the run, the Securitate caught him in 1976 in Cluj, after luring him there with the help of an informer. He was interrogated for 6 months in Bucharest. He was reportedly spared execution at the direct intervention of U.S. President Richard Nixon. Released, he was employed as a worker, then as a technician at a collective state farm in Miercurea Sibiului.

On December 23, 1989, Ogoranu went to Bucharest to participate in the Romanian Revolution. Subsequently, he studied the CNSAS archives and worked on his 7-volume memoirs, titled "Fir trees break but do not bend" (Romanian: Brazii se frâng dar nu se îndoiesc). He died in Galtiu in 2006 and was buried in the village cemetery; his wife died two months later.

== Legacy ==
Ogoranu's life is the subject of the 2010 film, Portrait of the Fighter as a Young Man. At the 60th Berlin International Film Festival, the movie attracted protests from organizations such as the Elie Wiesel National Institute for Studying the Holocaust in Romania, which demanded that the film be pulled due to glorification of antisemitism. The Festival refused to pull it, arguing that they don't believe in censorship, but they are aware that Ogoranu made publicly "extremist, racist, and antidemocratic statements" and that they do not support such views, and that the movie did not support such views either.

Streets in Alba Iulia and Făgăraș are named after him.

== Bibliography ==
- Gavrilă-Ogoranu, Ion (2009). Brazii se frâng, dar nu se îndoiesc. Vol. 1-2, Rezistența anticomunistă în Munții Făgărașului. Baia Mare: Marist. ISBN 978-973-8935-77-8. OCLC 895451966.
- Gavrilă-Ogoranu, Ion; Baki Nicoară, Lucia (1999). Brazii se frâng, dar nu se îndoiesc. Vol. 3, Din rezistența anticomunistă în Munții Făgăraș (PDF). Timișoara: Editura Marineasa. ISBN 973-95729-4-4. OCLC 1128904603. Archived from the original (PDF) on 2021-07-09.
- Gavrilă-Ogoranu, Ion (1993). Brazii se frâng, dar nu se îndoiesc. Vol. 4. Timișoara: Editura Marineasa. ISBN 973-85045-6-2. OCLC 895633859.
- Gavrilă-Ogoranu, Ion; Neagoe-Pleșa, Elis; Pleșa, Liviu (2007). Brazii se frîng, dar nu se îndoiesc. Vol. 7, Mișcarea de rezistență din munții Apuseni. Baia Mare: Marist. ISBN 978-973-8935-44-0. OCLC 895531410.

== See also ==
- August Sabbe
- Józef Franczak
- Kalev Arro

== Sources ==
- "The Ion Gavrilă Ogoranu Foundation". ogoranu.ro.
