= Vin americanii! =

Slogan used in Romania in the 1940s and 1950s

Vin americanii! ("The Americans are coming!") was a slogan used in Romania in the 1940s and 1950s, encapsulating the hope that an American-led invasion of Eastern Europe would topple the Soviet-backed, Communist-dominated government installed in early 1945. This notion helped sustain an anti-communist resistance movement and emboldened the civilians who aided it.

== Resistance groups ==
The expectation of the resistance groups that had withdrawn into the mountains was that World War III would break out between the British and the Americans on one side and the Soviets on the other. Under that scenario, the Soviet troops then occupying Romania would be driven out by the United States Army with help from the local resistance. Groups in Transylvania were prepared to eliminate communist officials as soon as war began, and take control of their particular region. They built supply lines with the local population, gathered armaments, munitions and money, and developed plans to attack institutions and communications networks. They were a prime target of the Securitate, which viewed them as agents of the American imperialists seeking to destabilise the regime.

There were smaller groups who fled to the mountains simply to avoid persecution without plans to topple the government, but they too hoped their efforts would be rewarded by America. For instance, the Arnota group hid in the mountains of northern Oltenia in winter 1949, planning to resist until a US invasion, which they expected that summer. After their capture in April, one of their members told Securitate investigators, "the goal of setting up in the mountains was to remain until around June, when we were told... an armed intervention by the Americans would take place, which would overthrow the regime, the only ones who would do it, because a domestic intervention has no chance of succeeding..."

Resistance groups uniformly saw American aid as vital to their success. One of the accusations put forth at the trial of the Sumanele Negre group was that its members had developed contacts with American intelligence officers, together studying the possibility of collaborating and coming up with a plan to overthrow the regime. This accusation was repeated for most groups captured later on.

American sources confirm the fact that the Central Intelligence Agency tried to develop links with Romanian partisans at the end of the 1940s. The Office of Policy Coordination recruited Romanian refugees in Western Europe starting in 1949. The latter were ready to establish contacts with resistance groups, whom they intended to supply with light arms, munitions, radio transmitters and medicines. To this end, the OPC created training camps in Italy, France, and Greece, where recruits learned how to use radio transmitters and make parachute jumps. The Graiul Sângelui organisation, led by professor Ion Vulcănescu and retired general Nicolae Ciupercă sought to facilitate the actions of American airborne troops which they hoped were to land in Romania. In the autumn of 1948, the organisation was disbanded by the Securitate and its leaders were arrested, tried, and condemned to long prison terms.

Exiled former Iron Guard members, working with American and French officers, developed a plan of their own, involving the parachuting of 50 men into Romania who would then contact mountain resistance groups. Preparations took place in the French Occupation Zone of Germany, around Paris, and in the south of France, with a focus on parachute jumping, night-time orientation, and shooting. Parachute jumps happened especially in Transylvania between 1950 and 1953, but many of those who dropped in were caught by the Securitate. 10 or 13 of them were executed in 1953, and recruitment ceased the following year.

The mountain groups placed great hope on the parachutes, awaiting money, arms, and munitions, but especially the signal that America was about to go to war. For instance, in the early 1950s, the Ion Gavrilă group in the Făgăraș Mountains tried contacting the Romanian National Committee in the United States, sending them a letter with the geographic coordinates where food and arms should be dropped. The group also tried sending a letter to the American legation in Bucharest in 1955, describing its harsh living conditions. American planes were also eagerly awaited by peasants and shepherds who helped the partisans, not only for political reasons, but also because the latter took food from them, promising to pay using money found in parachuted parcels. In 1953, for instance, the Gavrilă and Gheorghe Arsenescu–Toma Arnăuțoiu groups promised local shepherds they would pay the considerable sum of 100 lei per kilogram of cheese if a package containing 250,000 lei were found. This shows that as late as 1953, resistance groups and those who helped them were still motivated by the hope that the United States had not forgotten them. The Securitate was aware of this: in 1953, a report on the Gavrilă group claimed it was aided by "enemy elements, with a philo-American mentality".

The activity of the resistance groups was directly linked to the hope that "the Americans are coming". Many Romanians believed these groups had close links to representatives from Washington and that an action leading to the regime's fall was only a matter of time. Western radio stations, first Voice of America, the BBC, and later Radio Free Europe long maintained hope in an American intervention to free Eastern Europe. For resistance members, this conviction helped them continue their fight in dire conditions. For instance, historian Radu Ciuceanu, who was with a resistance group in the mountains at the time, says that if the Red Army had attacked Western Europe, as he expected then, the Romanian anti-communists could have freed the country from the influence of Moscow, with the victory of the West. In June 1949, during the trial of the partisans from Banat, a student from Făgăraș, Andrei Hașu, asked his colleagues: "People die in Banat and we sit and wait! What are we waiting? For the Americans to come?"

== General population ==
A January 1946 article in the popular magazine Viața Românească suggested that Romanians had been awaiting Americans' arrival since World War II, and hyperbolically presented the "benefits" of the bombing of Bucharest: "We waited for a long time and most of us thought we had waited in vain... But behold, something did come. These planes. Apparently destructive, they in fact brought salvation. Each American bomb was dropped in the service of high ideals of humanity, freedom, respect for human dignity and security".

The Soviet occupation, de facto begun in late August 1944, launched the "vin americanii" hope in earnest, but this was accentuated after November 1946, when the Communists won an election through intimidation and probable fraud, liquidated the opposition National Peasants' Party in July 1947, and forced King Michael to abdicate that December. These events made Romanians realise that Communism could only be defeated through outside intervention. As American envoy Rudolf E. Schoenfeld reported in August 1948, "The most frequently heard question addressed by a Romanian to an American, when he dares speak to one, is: Why don't you do anything?" According to archives of the Interior Ministry, which took the possibility of intervention seriously, anti-communist and anti-Soviet statements by people were common in 1946–47, and truly widespread in 1948. Quite often, these statements expressed hope that the King and the historic political parties would come back to rule after an American intervention. In 1946, rumour that war would begin was persistent, and would be continually recorded until 1950. Some believed the signing of the Paris Peace Treaty in February 1947 meant war; in May that year, it was thought Americans had bombed Soviet troops near Buzău; while that summer, rumours of an imminent war were prevalent in the northwest of the country. In advance of the farcical 1948 election, numerous pro-American leaflets and graffiti were discovered, which continued into the next year. Among the messages found were "long live the republicans until the arrival of the Americans" and, written in Hungarian in Miercurea-Ciuc, "long live the American and British armies that will free the people from communist dictatorship".

Invasion rumours were often very precise, specifying the date and manner armed intervention would take. One scenario involved troops disembarking en masse at Constanța on the Black Sea, brought over from Greece or Turkey. Another saw as many as 60,000 airplanes bombing strategic targets and driving out the Communists. Voice of America reports were amplified or distorted: for instance, when news of King Michael's meeting with U.S. President Harry S. Truman was broadcast in April 1948, it was said in Brăila that the latter had assured him he would soon regain his throne, and in Bucharest, that he would be back home before Easter.

In 1949, the communist authorities started the collectivization of agriculture. In the village of Cufoaia, in Maramureș County, Alecsa Bel, a wealthy peasant and the mayor of the locality from 1940 to 1946, refused to join the collective farm. He had an unwavering conviction that the Americans had to come, to get rid of the Russians, and he manifested this conviction in public, telling everyone that "the Americans are coming", that he had heard that on the crystal radio, where he listened to Western stations. For his stances, Bel paid with his life; apprehended at home, he was shot by the Securitate on Christmas Day, 1949.

At the 4th World Festival of Youth and Students in 1953, a number of young Romanians approached Western journalists, given a rare opportunity to make their opinions known to the outside world. They tended to be discouraged but still awaited American help, a hope boosted by the Korean War. One of them gave a written message to a US journalist: "Romanians put all their hopes in the American people. Everyone has understood that 1953 is the year of liberation. The Romanian people remains silent, with an open wound. But at the first chance we get, we will erupt. You have already seen the misery in which Romanian peasants live. They are ready to destroy communism at the first opportunity. Please transmit to the American people the greetings of Romanians subjugated by the red beasts".

== Disillusionment ==
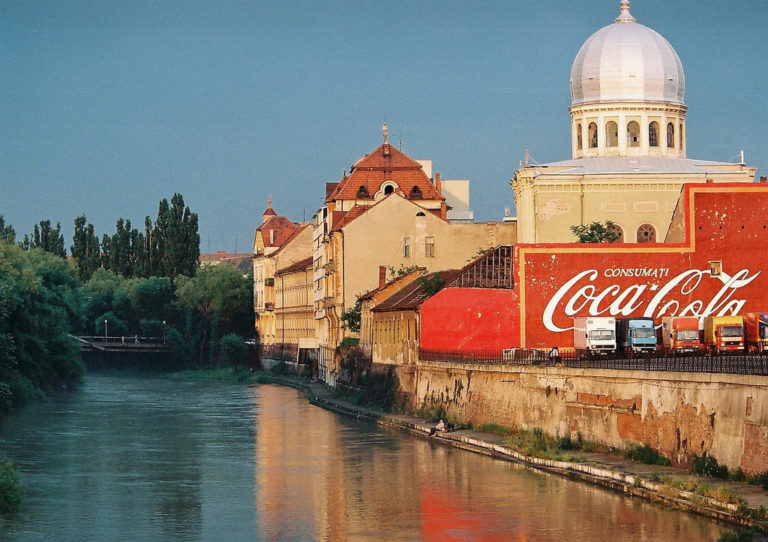
Oradea, 1998: a Coca-Cola advertisement along the Crișul Repede, in front of the Neolog Synagogue

Anticipation gradually gave way to resignation and disappointment as the 1950s wore on. For instance, ex-Prime Minister Constantin Argetoianu exclaimed in April 1950 (a month before being arrested and sent to Sighet Prison): "Even if they came with a wheelbarrow, they would have arrived by now." But it was only after the failure of the United States to intervene during the Hungarian Revolution of 1956 that hope for similar action in Romania was swept away. As historian Florin Constantinescu notes, "A strange phenomenon of collective psychology was the strong and enduring belief that the West and above all the US would pull Romania from beneath the Soviet boot. 'Vin americanii' was an expression that summarized a political attitude but also a state of mind. These resisted all proof of disinterest in Western capitals toward the countries left behind the 'Iron Curtain' and only after the crushing of the Hungarian revolution by the Red Army in 1956, beneath the passive gaze of the West, did Eastern Europeans, among them Romanians, begin to abandon their hopes and face reality". People turned to different ways of coping: flight, or the hope of flight; mental escape (Western music, yoga, bridge); and adopting Western lifestyles, to the extent this was possible.

In 2005, the Americans announced that an accord was reached allowing them a permanent base at Mihail Kogălniceanu International Airport (RoAF 57th Air Base) near Constanța. The Communist regime had long since been overthrown, however, and the expression "vin americanii!" was used in a more jocular or ironic fashion this time around. A similar pattern took place in 2011 when the United States announced plans to set up a NATO missile defence system in Deveselu Commune (Deveselu Military Base). The 2007 film California Dreamin' also plays on the theme: one of its protagonists suffered as a boy during the bombing of Bucharest and his parents, who eagerly awaited the Americans, were instead arrested by the Soviets, so he is quite resentful toward the American troops who finally arrive in his village in 1999 to take part in operations for the Kosovo War. Additionally, the phrase was associated with Michael Jackson's wildly popular Bucharest concerts, with emblematic products such as Coca-Cola and McDonald's and with popular culture offerings such as soap operas and MTV. The expression is also used jocularly to refer to the vain hope that somebody else will magically solve an entire country's problems; the sentiment is captured by the pop-rock band Taxi in the lyrics of their song, "Criogenia salvează România" ("Cryogenics saves Romania")

Hai să ne băgăm cu toții-n niște frigidere mari
Să ne congelăm pentru vreo sută de ani
Și să-i așteptăm liniștiți pe-americani.
Let's all cram ourselves in some big refrigerators
To freeze for about a hundred years
And wait, calmly, for the Americans.

The 2016 documentary Ține, Doamne, partizanii, până vin americanii! (directed by Dragoș Zămosteanu) presents the story of Aristina Pop-Săileanu, who stood out through her guerrilla activity in Maramureș, and led the anti-communist partisans in the Țibleș Mountains.

In February 2022, Vasile Dîncu, the Romanian Defense Minister, announced that "The Americans have arrived," in reference to over 100 US soldiers arriving in Romania to bolster NATO allies in Eastern Europe amid the prelude to the 2022 Russian invasion of Ukraine; this was interpreted by some in the local media as a reference to Vin americanii!.

== See also ==
- Western betrayal, for similar feelings in other European countries.
- Romania–United States relations
- The Russians are coming
