= Incești =

Incești may refer to several villages in Romania:

- Incești, a village in Avram Iancu Commune, Alba County
- Incești, a village in Poșaga Commune, Alba County
- Incești, a village in Ceica Commune, Bihor County
