= Valea Stanciului (river) =

- Location within Romania

Location
- Country: Romania
- Counties: Cluj County

Physical characteristics
- Mouth: Săcuieu
  - coordinates: 46.7065°N 22.8930°E
- Length: 15 km (9.3 mi)
- Basin size: 31 km^{2} (12 sq mi)

Basin features
- Progression: Săcuieu→ Crișul Repede→ Körös→ Tisza→ Danube→ Black Sea

The Valea Stanciului is a left tributary of the river Săcuieu in Romania. It flows into the Săcuieu in Răchițele. Its length is 15 km (9.3 mi) and its basin size is 31 km^{2} (12 sq mi). The river valley is known for its gorge Cheile Văii Stanciului and the Vălul Miresei waterfalls.
