= Săcuieu (river) =

Săcuieu Valea Răchițele, Pârâul Hențu
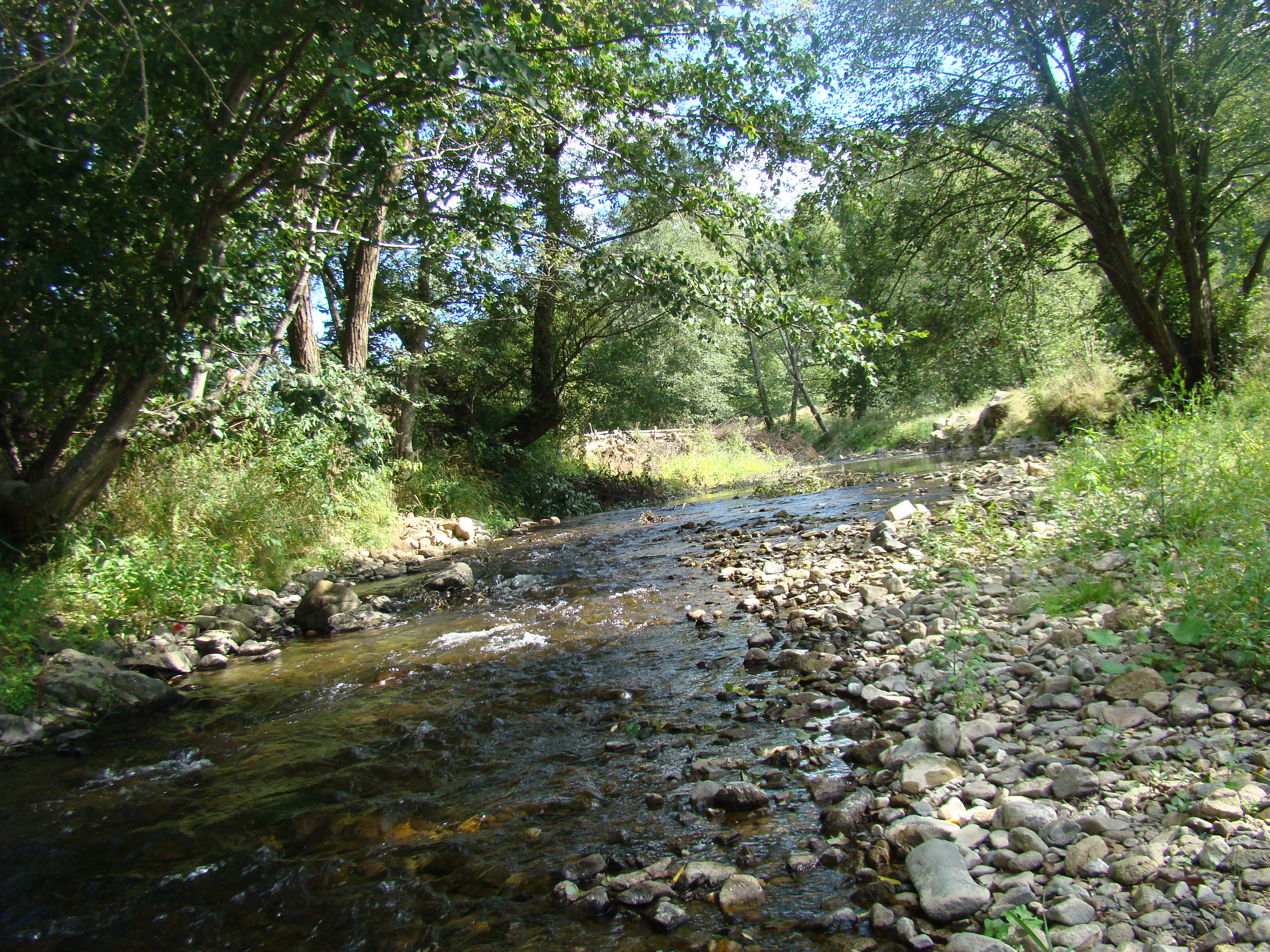

- Location within Romania

Location
- Country: Romania
- Counties: Cluj County
- Villages: Răchițele, Scrind-Frăsinet, Săcuieu, Bologa

Physical characteristics
- Mouth: Crișul Repede
  - location: Bologa
  - coordinates: 46.8935°N 22.8774°E
- Length: 31 km (19 mi)
- Basin size: 226 km^{2} (87 sq mi)

Basin features
- Progression: Crișul Repede→ Körös→ Tisza→ Danube→ Black Sea

The Săcuieu (in its upper course also Valea Răchițele, in its lower course also Pârâul Hențu or Henț) is a left tributary of the river Crișul Repede in Romania. Its source is in the Apuseni Mountains. It discharges into the Crișul Repede near Bologa. Its length is 31 km (19 mi) and its basin size is 226 km^{2} (87 sq mi).

== Tributaries ==
The following rivers are tributaries to the Săcuieu:

- Left: Valea Stanciului, Seciu, Răcad, Aluniș, Vișag
- Right: Mărgăuța
