= Memorialul Durerii =

- Memorialul Durerii
- Genre: documentary series
- Country of origin: Romania
- Original language: Romanian

Production
- Producer: Lucia Hossu-Longin
- Editors: Alexandru Munteanu; Doina Teodoru
- Production company: TVR 2

Original release
- Release: 1991

Related
- Seria Neagră

Memorialul Durerii (The Memorial of Suffering) is a Romanian Television documentary series about persecution, the labor camp system, anti-communist resistance and the secret police in Communist Romania. It started airing in 1991. The main producer is Lucia Hossu-Longin.

One of the most memorable interviews on the show was the one conducted in 1992 with Elisabeta Rizea, who joined an anti-Communist guerrilla group in the early 1950s, and then spent 12 years in prison, being subjected to torture.

== Legături externe ==
- Memorialul durerii pe Visit-ro.com
