= Radu Negru National College =

School in Făgăraș, Romania

Coordinates: 45.8424°N 24.9696°E

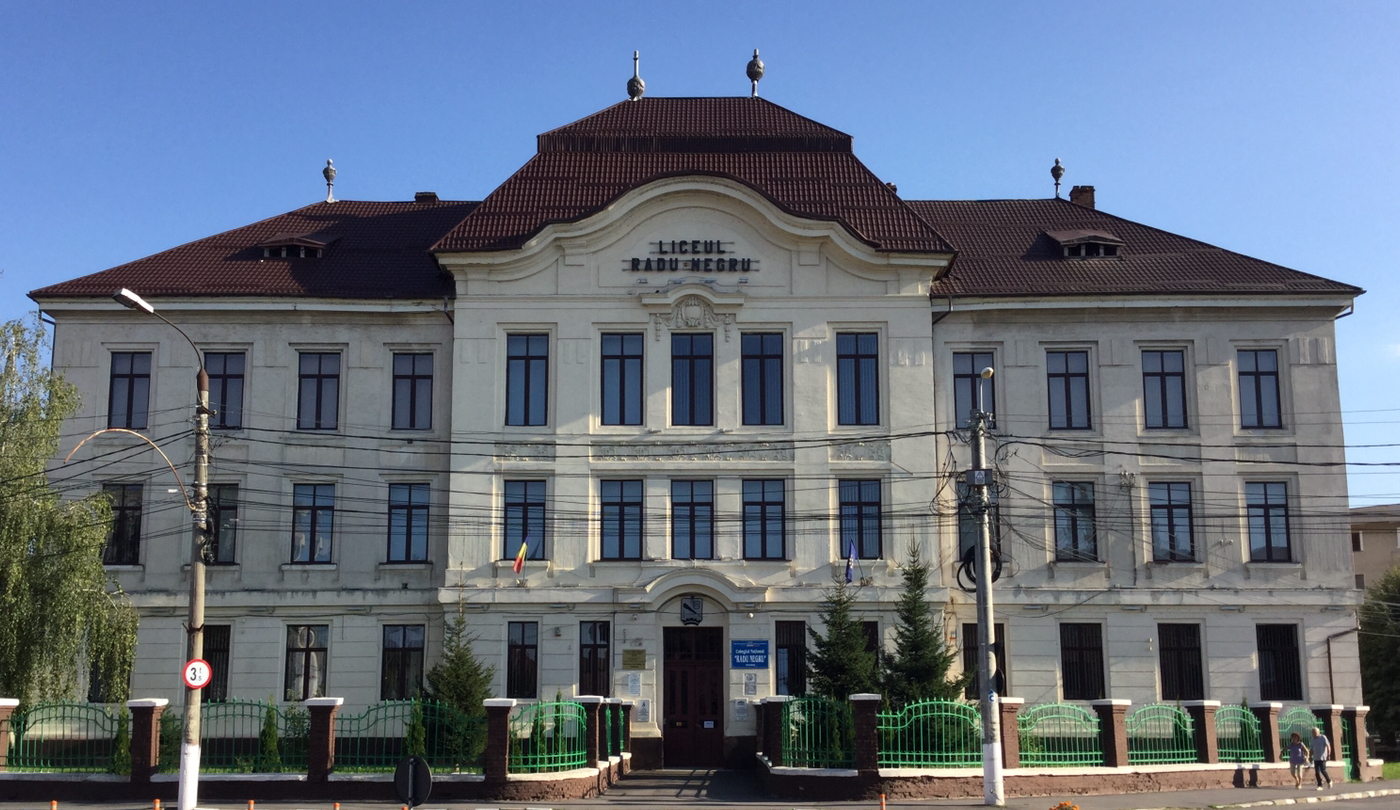
Radu Negru National College

Radu Negru National College (Romanian: Colegiul Național Radu Negru) is a high school located at 1 Școlii Street, Făgăraș, Romania.

== History ==
=== Origins in Austria-Hungary ===
The school traces its origins to 1869, when writer Ion Codru-Drăgușanu founded a Romanian-language school in what was then Austria-Hungary, naming it after the legendary ruler Radu Negru. Affiliated with the Romanian Orthodox Church, it operated from a building adjacent to a church, featuring four grades and three teachers. Subsequently, two high-school classes and a school for adults were added. Leading Romanian cultural figures donated funds, as did peasants from the surrounding Țara Făgărașului, the Parliament of Romania and four counties of the Romanian Old Kingdom. In 1873, the school was forced to close for lack of money. A church school with one teacher did continue to exist in the building until 1922.

From 1877, a multi-ethnic state school functioned in various rented buildings, with a boys’ and a girls’ section. In 1898, the institution was converted into a gymnasium with eight grades, the equivalent of today's grades 5-12. The upper grades started being introduced in 1902, with the full complement ready by 1905. The current building, on three levels in Baroque Revival style, dates to 1907–1909; it was designed by Hungarian architect Ignác Alpár. The boys of the gymnasium moved into the new building in autumn 1909.

=== Romanian period ===
Shortly after the 1918 union of Transylvania with Romania, the school was taken over by the Romanian state, initially by the Directing Council in Sibiu. It was formally named after Radu Negru in October 1919, with classes being taught only in Romanian from that point. During the interwar period, the school became an elite institution, with rigorous admission standards and strict grading. Thus, of 175 pupils who started in 1920, only 27 were left for the final year of study. Among the scholars who visited and reported a positive evaluation were Nicolae Iorga, Ovid Densusianu and Mihail Dragomirescu. A military hospital functioned inside the building during World War II.

In 1948, the new communist regime dropped the Radu Negru name. Soon after, former student Ion Gavrilă Ogoranu formed an armed group, part of the Romanian anti-communist resistance movement; several of its leaders had been classmates at Radu Negru. Various changes followed through the late 1960s, including the admission of girls in 1956 and a constant oscillation between 10, 11 and 12 grades being offered. Meanwhile, the school retained its prestige, supplying most of the local economic, educational, medical and administrative elite.

In 1970, Radu Negru's name was restored. In 1977, the high school students and teachers of what is now Doamna Stanca National College were transferred to Radu Negru, further enhancing its academic reputation, highlighted during national olympiads. In 1982, after being made an industrial high school, it underwent a thorough modernization process, with a number of science and language laboratories being opened. The industrial profile was shelved after the Romanian Revolution, and the school was declared a national college in 1996.

== Alumni ==
- Remus Răduleț (1923)
- Traian Herseni (1924)
- Virgil Fulicea (1925)
- Horia Sima (1926)
- Nicolae Lupu
- Gheorghe Mociorniță (1938)
- Ion Gavrilă Ogoranu
- Mircea Malița
- Octavian Paler (1945)
- Paul Goma (1953)
- Laurențiu Streza (1965)
- Nicușor Dan (1988)
