= Mărgăuța =

- Location within Romania

Location
- Country: Romania
- Counties: Cluj County
- Villages: Mărgău

Physical characteristics
- Mouth: Săcuieu
  - coordinates: 46.7644°N 22.8955°E
- Length: 12 km (7.5 mi)
- Basin size: 33 km^{2} (13 sq mi)

Basin features
- Progression: Săcuieu→ Crișul Repede→ Körös→ Tisza→ Danube→ Black Sea
- River code: III.1.44.4.3

The Mărgăuța is a right tributary of the river Săcuieu in Romania. It flows into the Săcuieu near Scrind-Frăsinet. Its length is 12 km (7.5 mi) and its basin size is 33 km^{2} (13 sq mi).
