= Iosif Capotă =

Romanian resistance fighter (1912–1958)

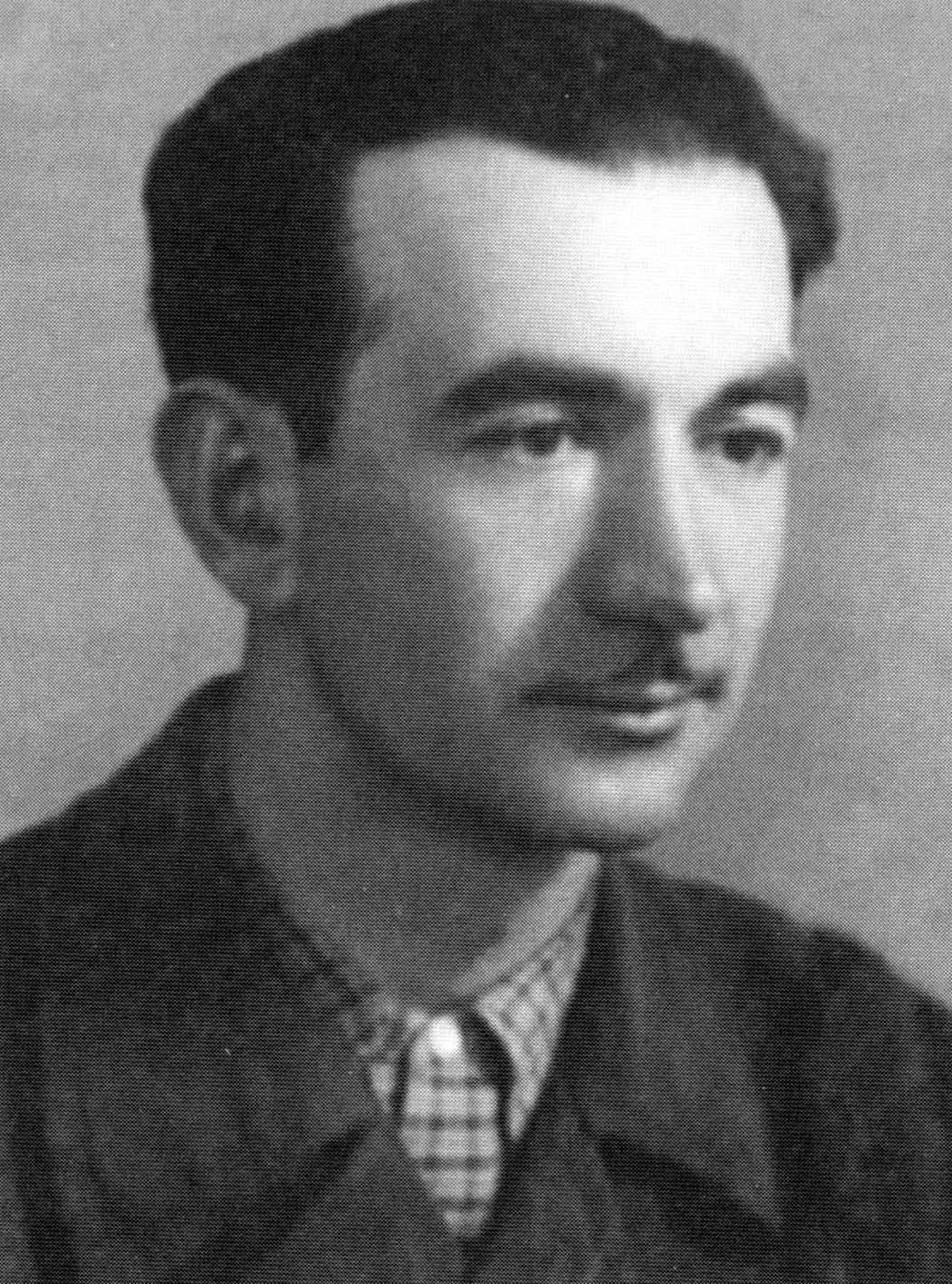
Iosif Capotă, around 1930

Iosif Capotă (January 24, 1912 – September 2, 1958) was a physician who, after the Soviet occupation of Romania, became the leader of an anti-communist resistance group in the Mărgău–Huedin area.

Capotă was born in the village of Mărgău, Cluj County in a family of Greek-Catholic peasants. He was one of five siblings (along with Ana, Gheorghe, Victor, and Susana) in a family led by Gheorghe and Susana Capotă. He attended the George Barițiu High School in Cluj and the Faculty of Veterinary Medicine in Bucharest, after which he settled in Huedin to practice his specialty.

In September 1940, after the annexation of Northern Transylvania by Hungary, he and his family moved to Câmpia Turzii. After returning to Huedin in 1944, he joined the National Peasants' Party and ran for office in the 1946 parliamentary elections, in which a communist-dominated coalition won. Subsequently, he was harassed and arrested for 10 days in March 1947; fearing for his life, he decided to leave Huedin and go underground on May 9, 1947.

Finally caught by Securitate troops on December 7, 1957, Capotă was condemned to death on July 8, 1958, and executed by firing squad on September 2, 1958, at Gherla Prison.
