= Samoilă Mârza =

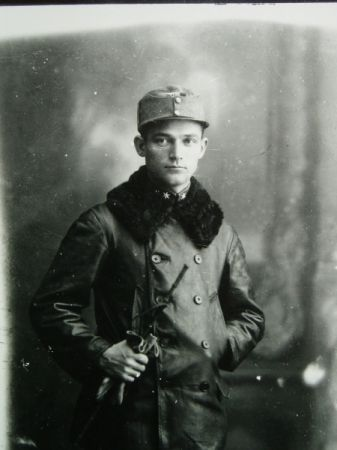
- Mârza at around 1918
- Born: 18 September 1886; Galtiu, Austria-Hungary
- Died: 9 December 1967 (aged 81); Alba-Iulia, Socialist Republic of Romania
- Occupation: Photographer
- Known for: taking the only photographs of the Great National Assembly of Alba Iulia

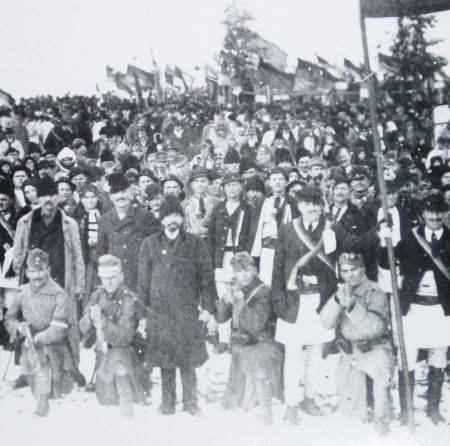
Crowd scene from the December 1, 1918 Alba Iulia assembly (detail)

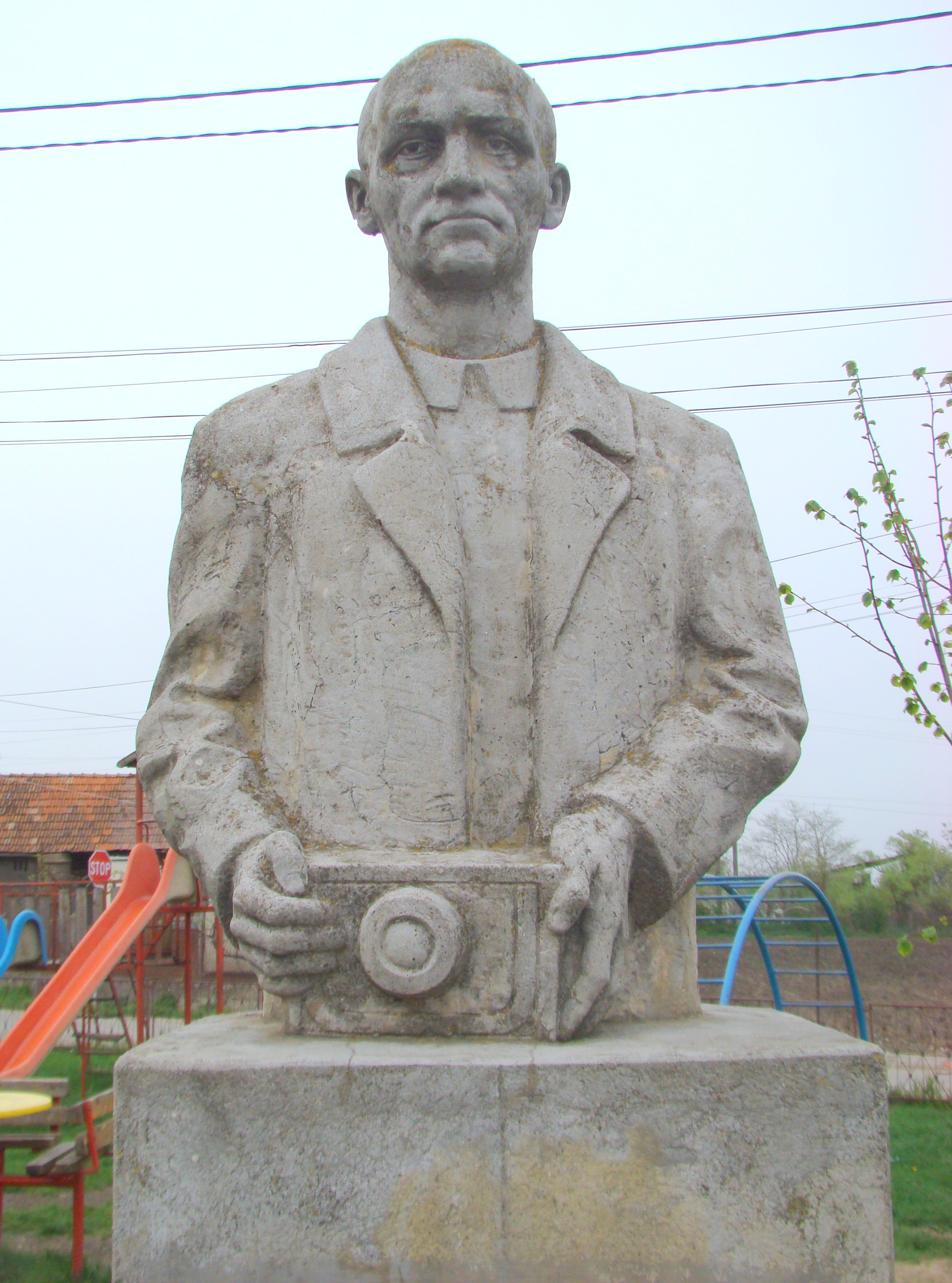
Bust of Samoilă Mârza in his native village Galtiu

Samoilă Mârza (Romanian pronunciation: [samoˈilə ˈmɨrza]; 18 September 1886 – 19 December 1967) was an Austro-Hungarian-born Romanian photographer. A native of Transylvania region and a veteran of World War I, he is best known for taking the only photographs of the Great National Assembly of Alba Iulia that proclaimed the Union of Transylvania with Romania on 1 December 1918. The day is celebrated as Romania's national holiday, and, with time, Mârza's images acquired political and documentary significance.

== Biography ==
Born to peasant parents Ștefan and Ana in Galtiu village, Sântimbru Commune, Alba County, Mârza attended a Greek-Catholic primary school in the village and high school in Alba Iulia. Between 1909 and 1911, his parents sent him as apprentice to a photographer in Sibiu, where he learned the profession. With the outbreak of World War I in 1914, he was mobilized and sent into battle as a soldier in the Austro-Hungarian Army, where he served first on the Austrian front in Galicia, reaching as far north as Riga, before being transferred to the Italian Front in 1916. As part of the army's topographic and photographic service for over three years, he took pictures of fighting soldiers and scenes of the war's devastation, likely making him the first Romanian war photographer.

As the war drew to a close in late 1918, Mârza was in Trieste, whence he left for Vienna together with many other Transylvanian Romanian soldiers. He arrived there in early November, planning to head home. That month in the Austrian capital, he took three pictures depicting the blessing of the first tricolor flag belonging to the Central National Romanian Council, in the presence of General Ioan Boieriu, of political leader Iuliu Maniu and the assembled troops. Together with several thousand soldiers, he returned to Transylvania from Vienna in order to participate at the Alba Iulia assembly. The road through Budapest and Arad was blocked by Hungarian forces hostile to the Council, so they went instead via Zagreb, Belgrade and Timișoara, where Serbian forces allowed them to pass provided they were disarmed.

The Great National Assembly at Alba Iulia proclaimed the Union of Transylvania with Romania on 1 December. That morning, Mârza took three pictures of his fellow villagers before heading for the city. Arriving with a delegation from Galtiu around 11 a.m. on a cloudy day, he carried his camera, then about fifteen years old, in a sheepskin bag, his tripod and glass plates on a bicycle. Not being accredited, he was not admitted into the hall where the act of union was signed, and the photographer hired for the occasion did not show up. (According to local legend, he was an ethnic Hungarian who did not wish to participate at the event.) Despite the bad weather and the difficulty of using the camera, Mârza managed to take five pictures of the assembly. Three showed the assembled crowds, and the other two the podium from which the act was read in public by the politician Aurel Vlad and the Greek-Catholic Bishop Iuliu Hossu. These are the only pictures of the assembly. That day, he took fourteen pictures in all; he later explained that he was unable to take more because the glass plates were expensive and heavy, and the poor light required people to stand still for his shots.

At the beginning of 1919, he included the pictures in an album called Marea Adunare de la Alba Iulia în chipuri ("The Great Assembly at Alba Iulia in Pictures"), mentioned in the newspaper Alba Iulia on 10 March. This album was presented by the Romanian delegation to the Paris Peace Conference and during negotiations on the Treaty of Trianon as part of its attempt to justify the country's incorporation of Transylvania, stating the pictures indicated ethnic Romanians' self-determination to unite with Romania. Other copies were sent to leading figures such as King Ferdinand, Prime Minister Ion I. C. Brătianu, Maniu (by then president of the Directing Council of Transylvania) and General Henri Mathias Berthelot. The album met with appreciation, including from Nicolae Iorga, who made a note of receiving it in his diary. Copies of the pictures were also owned by numerous peasant households in the vicinity of Alba Iulia.

Mârza continued to travel around his county and further afield in Transylvania on his bicycle, photographing other patriotic events, including the 1919 visit of King Ferdinand to Alba Iulia, Abrud and Câmpeni; the October 1922 coronation of Ferdinand and Queen Marie at Alba Iulia; the 1924 celebrations at Ţebea marking the centenary of Avram Iancu's birth; and the 1929 festivities at Alba Iulia marking a decade of union, where he was decorated by officials. His photographs included both dignitaries and ordinary people in traditional costumes, weddings, baptisms and traditional celebrations. In 1924, following an audience with Brătianu, he managed to obtain funding for continuing the painting at the Alba Iulia Orthodox Cathedral, which had been abandoned after the coronation in 1922.

In 1967, the head of the National Museum of the Union bought from Mârza the camera he used and the pictures he took at the assembly. The photographer noted that he had been forced to sell other pictures due to financial need, earning money from the special glass they were made of. He planned to design a new album for 1968 and with funds from the museum purchased a working camera that he intended to use at the upcoming semicentennial. However, he died at the end of 1967 and was buried in Alba Iulia. In 2003, a monument was erected over his grave, a bust of him unveiled in his native village, and a biography published.
