= Gheorghe Arsenescu =

Romanian Army officer and anti-communist resistance fighter

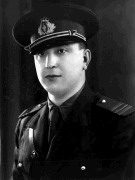
- Born: 31 May 1907; Câmpulung, Argeș County, Kingdom of Romania
- Died: 29 May 1962 (aged 54); Jilava Prison, Ilfov County, Romanian People's Republic
- Education: Carol I National Defence University
- Military career
- Allegiance: Kingdom of Romania
- Branch: Army
- Service years: 1924–1946
- Rank: Colonel
- Unit: 2nd Mountain Division
- Conflicts: World War II
- Awards: Order of the Star of Romania; Order of the German Eagle
- Other work: Leader of Haiducii Muscelului resistance group (1948–1960)

Gheorghe Arsenescu (May 31, 1907 – May 29, 1962) was a Romanian Army officer who led an anti-communist resistance movement in post-World War II Romania.

== Biography ==
=== Early years and World War II ===
He was born in Câmpulung. His father, Captain Ion Arsenescu, fought in World War I and was killed in action at the Battle of Mărășești. Gheorghe Arsenescu graduated from the "Dinicu Golescu" High School in his hometown, and then, following in the military tradition of his father, enrolled in the Higher War School, in Bucharest. After graduating in 1924, he joined the 30th Regiment Dorobanți from Câmpulung.

At the start of World War II he was Operations Chief for the 2nd Mountain Division (Vânători de munte), under the command of General Ioan Dumitrache. He fought in the Crimean campaign, was wounded, and then returned to the front. During the war he rose to the rank of colonel. He was decorated in 1940 with the Order of the Star of Romania, 3rd Class, and in 1941 with the Order of the German Eagle. After being discharged in 1946, he joined the National Liberal Party–Tătărescu. He started a small farm to provide milk to the Câmpulung market; accused of economic sabotage, he went into hiding.

=== Anti-communist resistance ===
In the summer of 1947 Arsenescu hid firearms at the Cetățuia Monastery in Cetățeni. The following spring, he set up the "Dragoslavele" rebel group, which included Gheorghe Hachenzelner, Petre Cojocaru, Longhin Predoiu, Ion Mică, and Ion and Gheorge Purnichescu, and had the support of the monastery abbot, Pimen Bărbierul. In the fall of 1948, the group dispersed, and Arsenescu, after spending some time hidden in Câmpulung-Muscel, went to Bucharest. There, together with a fellow army officer, Toma Arnăuțoiu, he formed in December 1948 a group named "Haiducii Muscelului" (Romanian for "The Hajduks from Muscel"). In March 1949, the two of them went to Nucșoara, where they found shelter with Arnăuțoiu's parents and brother. Arsenescu started recruiting locals, arguing that he possessed armament, that he had personal contacts with the French Embassy, and that the West was bound to start a war with the Soviet Union, therefore the days of the Communist regime were numbered (a belief popularly known as Vin americanii!).

His resistance group operated out of the Southern Făgăraș Mountains; according to reports by the Communist authorities, the group was responsible for a number of robberies and murders. On the night of June 18, 1949, members of Arsenescu's group were ambushed by troops of the Securitate; in the ensuing firefight, two officers were killed, but the group of partisans escaped through a security cordon thrown around the area. After this close call, Arnăuțoiu and Arsenescu decided to split into two separate groups, so as to minimize chances the resistance in the area would be decapitated if they were caught together. Later that year, Arsenescu narrowly escaped capture yet again, once in Bughea de Sus and once in Mățău, after being betrayed by some neighbors.

In 1950, the Pitești branch of the Securitate demonstratively executed, without trial, at Izvoarele, one of Arsenescu's aides, Traian Marinescu Geagu, a peasant student from Dâmbovița County. In the fall of 1951, Arsenescu was ambushed by the security forces while crossing Râul Târgului; badly wounded by gunfire, he managed to hide in the woods and found refuge in the home of Apostol Postoaca.

=== Capture and death ===
Arsenescu was finally captured by the Securitate on February 1, 1960. In February 1962 he was sentenced to death by the Bucharest Military Tribunal for "terrorist acts perpetrated as organizer of an armed group of anti-communist resistance", and was executed on May 29, 1962 at Jilava Prison. A notable member of Arsenescu's resistance movement was Elisabeta Rizea, who was captured by the Securitate at the same time as he was.
