= Leon Șușman =

Romanian fascist and anti-communist militant

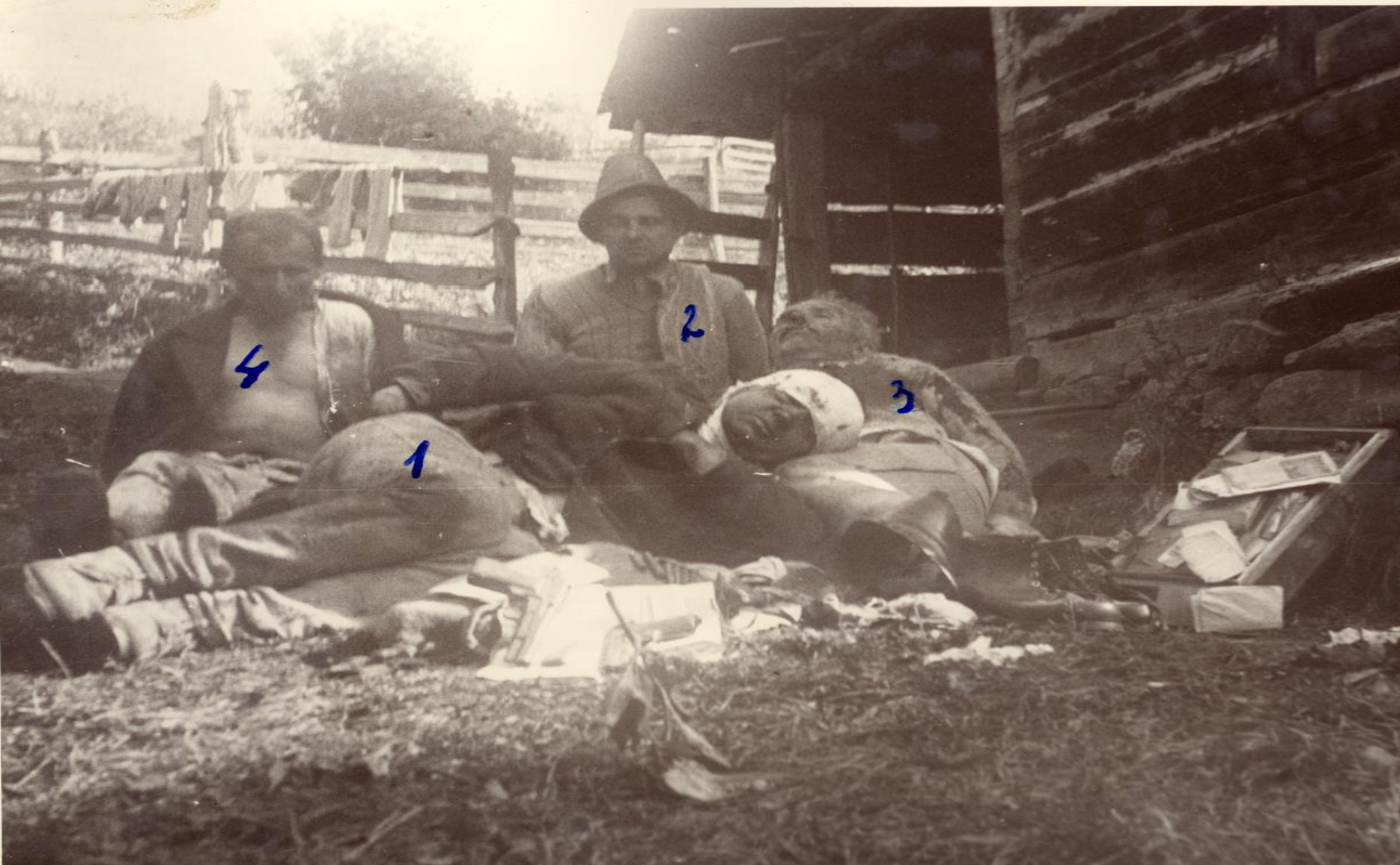
Dead bodies of Leon Șușman (1) and Father Simion Roșa (3) after being ambushed by the Securitate in Poșaga; photographed alongside two of their comrades, who had been captured alive

Leon Șușman (June 10, 1910 – July 19, 1957) was a member of the fascist paramilitary organization the Iron Guard who, following the Soviet occupation of Romania and establishment of the Romanian People's Republic, became the leader of an anti-communist paramilitary group in the Apuseni Mountains.

Șușman was born in Măhăceni, Alba County on June 10, 1910, in a family of Greek-Catholic peasants. After graduating with a law degree from the University of Cluj, he joined the Iron Guard. In 1941 he was sentenced to 10 years in prison for his participation in the Legionnaires' rebellion and Bucharest pogrom; however, he escaped capture and fled to the Apuseni Mountains. In 1945, following an agreement between Iron Guard leader Nicolae Petrașcu and Interior Minister Teohari Georgescu which granted Iron Guard members amnesty in exchange for turning in their weapons, Șușman returned to civilian life and practiced law in Ocna Mureș; he did so until May 15, 1948, when the Communist authorities started to arrest ex-members of the Iron Guard and fascist sympathizers.

At that time, Leon and his brother, Gheorghe Șușman, went underground, hiding from the authorities in the area between Turda, Ocna Mureș, Aiud, and Blaj. From 1949 to 1950 Leon led an anti-communist paramilitary group in the Măhăceni–Aiud area. Between 1950 and 1957, he was the leader of the resistance group in the Poșaga area, together with the Greek-Catholic priest Simion Roșa. The Securitate secret police sent 10 officers in the area, headed by Major Constantin Vieru, under cover of being geologists. To eliminate the Șușman resistance group, the Romanian security forces used informers against them and intercepted the correspondence of family members. One informer, code-named "Maxim Ionescu", informed the Securitate that the Șușman brothers were going to celebrate Saint Elijah together with Ilie Brad and Simion Roșa in the house of Vasile Crișan from the Poșaga village of Săgagea. Șușman died in Poșaga de Sus of wounds sustained in a shootout with Securitate troops during the night of July 18–19, 1957.

Roșa also died that night, as did the chief of the Securitate detachment; two other members of the resistance group, Gheorghe Șușman and Crișan, were caught alive. In the aftermath of the Poșaga shootout, dozens of supporters of the Șușman–Roșa anti-communist resistance group were arrested and tried by the Cluj Military Tribunal. Gheorghe Șușman and Vasile Crișan were sentenced to death in April 1958. They were both executed at Gherla Prison on August 4 of that year. Also executed at Gherla around that time were Ilie Vlad, Teodor Trânca, Vasile Răfăilă, and Andrei Bicuț, peasants from the area found guilty of being supporters of the Șușman group. Others were sent to prison, and numerous families were deported to the Bărăgan and had their properties confiscated.
