= Gumuțeasca =

Argot spoken in the commune of Mărgău in Romania

Location of the commune of Mărgău in Romania, where Gumuțeasca is spoken

Gumuțească or Gomuțeasca (sometimes referred to as limba gumuțească, "Gumutseascan language", (Note: Anglification of the name of the argot, which lacks an actual name or translation in English.) or limba de sticlă, "the glass language") is an argot (a speech form spoken by a group of people to prevent outsiders from understanding them) used exclusively in the commune of Mărgău in Cluj County, Romania. The people of Mărgău traditionally worked with glass for centuries, making mirrors, windows and religious icons and selling them to other parts of the country such as Bucharest, the capital of Romania, or Brăila and Constanța. The people of Mărgău wandered all over the country to practice their profession, and in order to warn each other of possible dangerous people on the way to cities or to be able to put prices to their glass products without outsiders being able to understand them, they invented Gumuțeasca as a form of speech that only they could understand.

Although Gumuțeasca has been spoken for more than 100 years and it has been passed from generation to generation, today only a few people continue to speak it. This is because the practice of the traditional profession of Mărgău has been reduced considerably and because part of the local population has left the place. The emergence of insulated glazing and glass-manufacturing companies also caused the people of Mărgău to lose customers. Some linguists from Cluj County have defined the argot as a "rural professional argot", which would be the only one of this type known in Romania. Gheorghe Braica, former protopope of Cluj-Napoca and a native of Mărgău, explained in his Monografia Mărgăului ("Monograph of Mărgău") that Gumuțeasca first developed at the base of the Apuseni Mountains and that it spread from there to nearby villages.

Gumuțeasca has thousands of words and a rich vocabulary that is very different from standard Romanian. Some examples of the argot are:

- Tălăuz ("Glass", sticlă in Romanian).
- Munuc ("Hey", "dude" or "lad", băi in Romanian).
- Munuc, s-asface spurav! ("Be careful, he/she is a dangerous person!", Fii atent că e om rău! in Romanian).
- Munuc, s-asface deapsă! ("He/she is a good person!", E un om bun! in Romanian).
- Munuc, atină gădineală! ("Ask for food!", Să ceri mâncare! in Romanian).
- Tălăuzești? ("Do you understand?", Înțelegi? in Romanian; or "Do you speak Gumuțeasca?", Vorbești gumuțeasca? in Romanian).

== See also ==
- Totoiana, an inverted speech form spoken in Romania
- Romanian dialects, even if Gumuțeasca does not represent a dialect
