= Poșaga =

- Commune
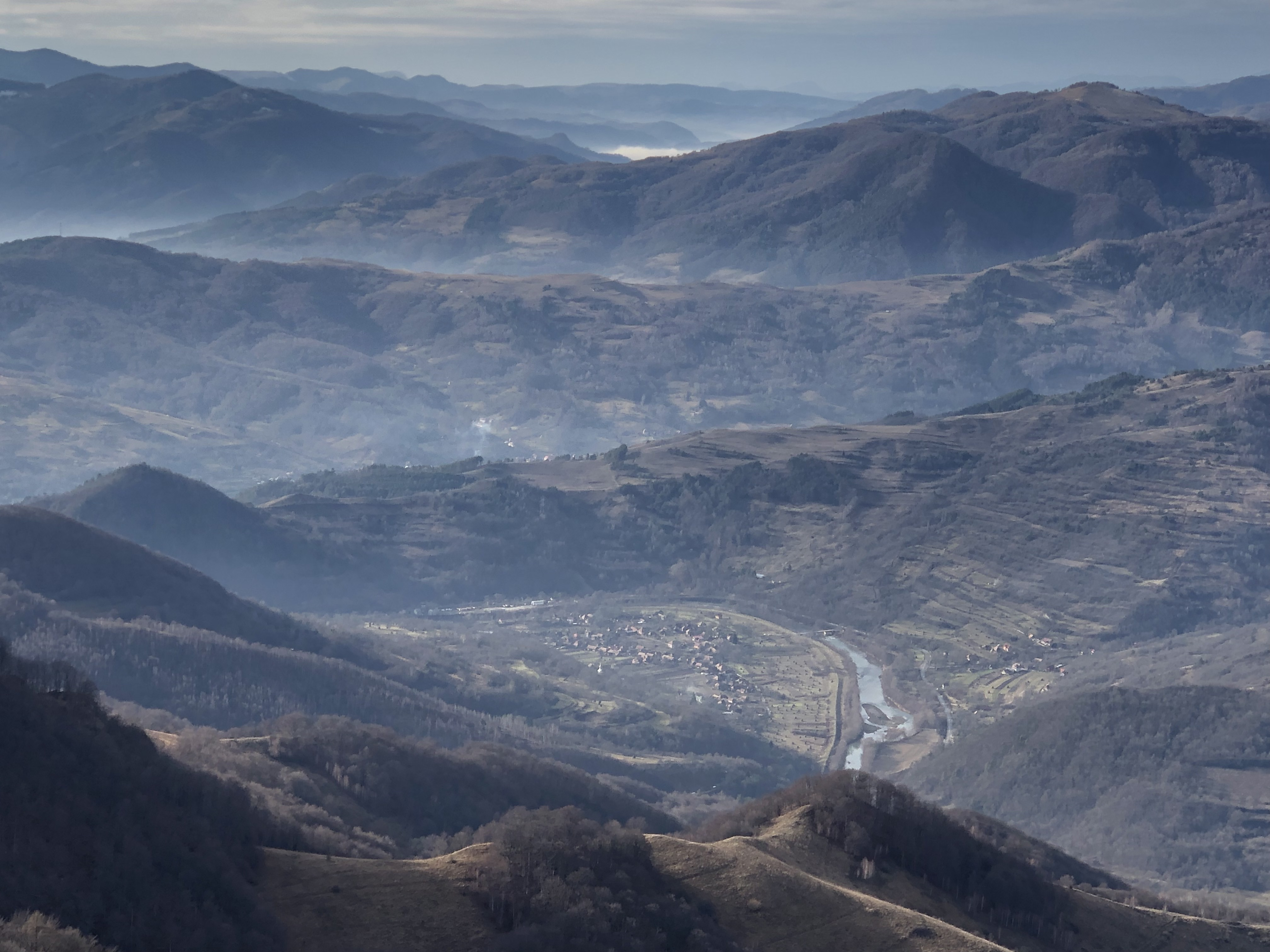
- Lunca Arieșului (Poșaga), seen from Ugerului Peak

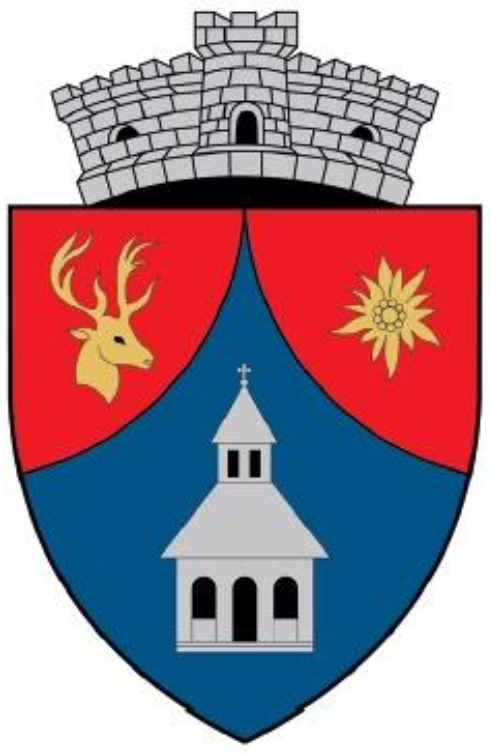
- Coat of arms

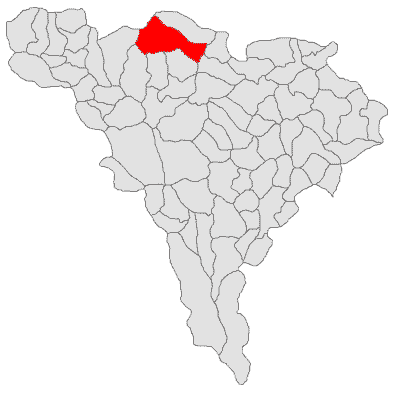
- Location in Alba County

- Location in Romania
- Coordinates: 46°28′N 23°23′E
- Country: Romania
- County: Alba

Government
  - Mayor (2020–2024): Ionel Bulgăr (PNL)
- Area: 136.28 km^{2} (52.62 sq mi)
- Elevation: 455 m (1,493 ft)
- Population (2021-12-01): 835
  - Density: 6.13/km^{2} (15.9/sq mi)
- Time zone: UTC+02:00 (EET)
  - Summer (DST): UTC+03:00 (EEST)
- Postal code: 517575
- Area code: +40 x58
- Vehicle reg.: AB
- Website: comunaposaga.ro

Poșaga (German: Puschendorf; Hungarian: Podsága) is a commune located in Alba County, Transylvania, Romania. It has a population of 835 as of 2021, and is composed of seven villages: Corțești, Incești (Jencsest), Lunca (Aranyoslonka), Orăști (Orest), Poșaga de Jos (the commune center; Alsópodsága), Poșaga de Sus (Felsőpodsága), and Săgagea (Szegázs).

The commune is situated in the Apuseni Mountains, between the Trascău Mountains and Muntele Mare, at the confluence of the Poșaga and Arieș rivers. It is located in the northern part of the county, on the border with Cluj County. The villages of Lunca and Poșaga de Jos are crossed by national road DN76; Baia de Arieș is 23 km (14 mi) to the west and Turda is 40 km (25 mi) to the east. The Poșaga Gorge is a 10 ha (25 acres) protected area along the river Poșaga, between Poșaga de Jos and Poșaga de Sus.

Leon Șușman, the leader of an armed anti-communist resistance group from the 1950s, died in Poșaga de Sus in a shootout with Securitate troops in July 1957.

Historical population
Year	Pop.	±%
2002	1,383	—
2011	1,048	−24.2%
2021	835	−20.3%
Source: Census data
