= Poșaga (river) =

- Location within Romania

Location
- Country: Romania
- Counties: Alba County
- Villages: Poșaga

Physical characteristics
- Mouth: Arieș
  - location: Poșaga de Jos
  - coordinates: 46.426°N 23.455°E
- Length: 24 km (15 mi)
- Basin size: 111 km^{2} (43 sq mi)

Basin features
- Progression: Arieș→ Mureș→ Tisza→ Danube→ Black Sea
- Tributaries
  - left: Incești, Săgagea, Belioara

The Poșaga is a small river in the Apuseni Mountains, Alba County, western Romania. It is a left tributary of the river Arieș. It flows through the municipality Poșaga, and joins the Arieș near the village Poșaga de Jos. It is fed by several smaller streams, including Incești, Săgagea and Belioara. Its length is 24 km (15 mi) and its basin size is 111 km^{2} (43 sq mi).
