= Totoiana =

Inverted speech form spoken in the village of Totoi in Romania

Location of the village of Totoi in Romania, where Totoiana is spoken

Totoiana ("Totoian"), also known as the "Totoian language" (Romanian: Limba totoiană) or the "inverted language" (Romanian: Limba întoarsă), is a speech form used in the village of Totoi in Alba County, Romania. It is unique to the village and not spoken in the other villages that form part of the commune of Sântimbru, to which Totoi belongs. Totoiana was created with the purpose of being unintelligible for normal Romanian speakers, although its origins or the reason why this would be needed are unknown. It has been said that, since the inhabitants of Totoi were good wood artisans who traded with their products, Totoiana could have been created so that other merchants could not understand them. However, George Cadar, a member of the Romanian Association of Semiotic Studies, claims to have recorded a similar form of speech far from Alba County, although he did not elaborate on this. Some also say it was created by servants so that their boyar employers in the nobility class could not understand them.

Totoiana is still spoken in the village, and its inhabitants recall that Totoiana was once more widely spoken than standard Romanian in Totoi, even if it is now only used for fun "with a beer". To speak Totoiana, the Romanian word is said from the middle to the end and then the beginning is added to it. For simple two-syllable words, the syllables are inverted. For example, masă ("table") would become săma. A "u" is generally added for words that are harder to pronounce when inverted. This is the case of pahar ("cup"), which becomes harupa in Totoiana. Other examples of Totoiana are Fanuște, Laenico and Anio ("Ștefan", "Nicolae" and "Ioan", Romanian names), cava ("cow", vaca in Romanian) and nudru nubu ("farewell", drum bun in Romanian).

An inverted speech form similar to Totoiana also exists in the French language and is known as verlan (from l'envers, "the inverse", but inverted).

== See also ==
- Gumuțeasca, an argot spoken in Romania
- Romanian dialects, even if Totoiana does not represent a dialect
