= The Russians are coming =

Phrase attributed to James Forrestal

"The Russians are coming" is a phrase attributed to United States Secretary of Defense James Forrestal in 1949. In full, Forrestal said "The Russians are coming. The Russians are coming. They're right around. I've seen Russian soldiers."

Forrestal allegedly uttered those words while suffering from mental illness, not long before committing suicide. The allegation originated with Forrestal's bitter political enemy, columnist Drew Pearson, and has been verified by no other person. This is what Townsend Hoopes and Douglas Brinkley have to say about the episode in their 1992 book, Driven Patriot, the Life and Times of James Forrestal:

Pearson had, in fact, decided to fire his heaviest ammunition in a radio broadcast on April 9. He charged that Forrestal, awakened by the sound of a fire siren (on the night of April 1 at Hobe Sound), had rushed out of his cottage screaming, "The Russians are attacking." He defined Forrestal's condition as "temporary insanity." In subsequent newspaper columns he asserted that Forrestal made three suicide attempts while in Florida – by drug overdose, by hanging, and by slashing his wrists. According to a later statement by [Navy psychiatrist Captain George] Raines, all of these assertions were lies.

— pp. 455–456.

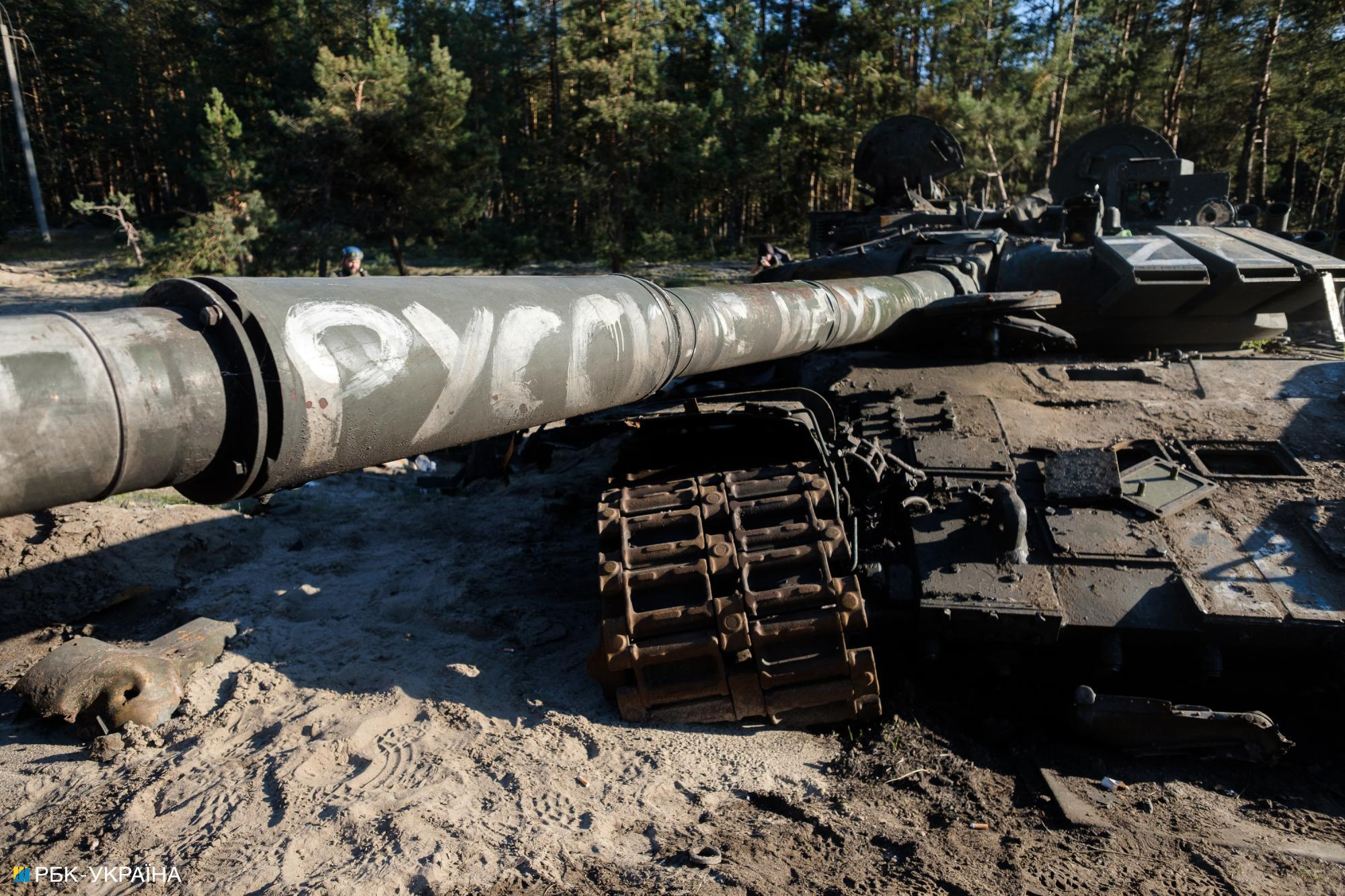
The phrase on a tank left by Russian army while retreating from Kupiansk, Ukraine

Since then the phrase has been used in various contexts.

== See also ==
- "The British are coming"
- "Vin americanii!"
