= Sântimbru, Alba =

Sântimbru
- Commune
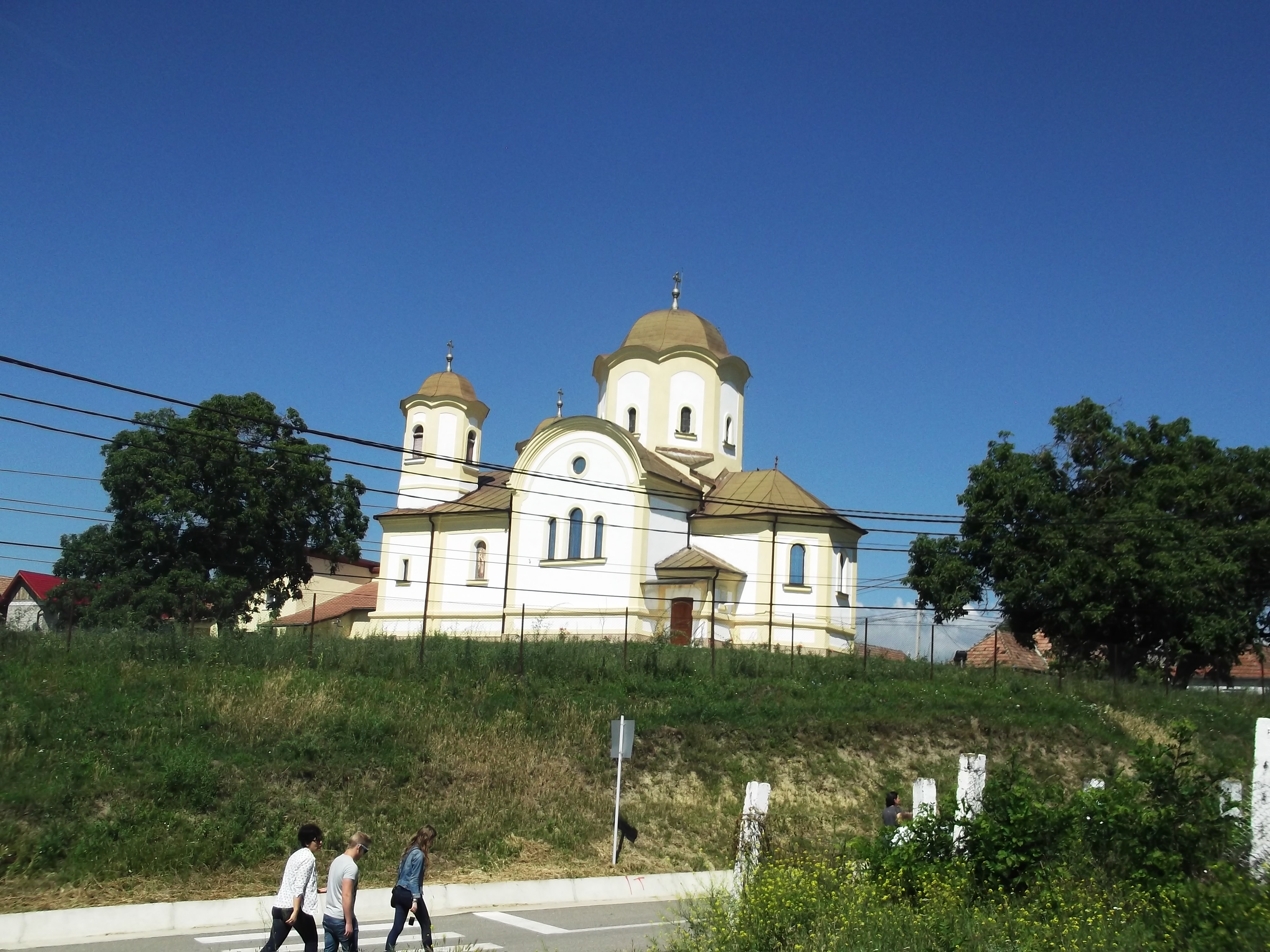
- Romanian Orthodox church

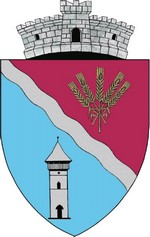
- Coat of arms

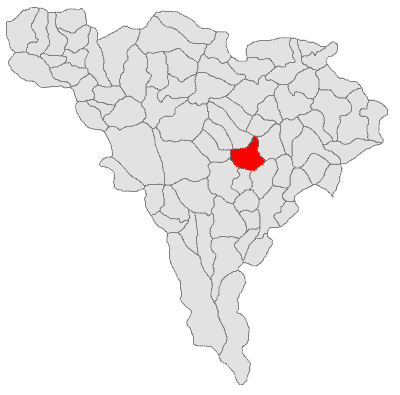
- Location in Alba County

- Location in Romania
- Coordinates: 46°8′N 23°39′E
- Country: Romania
- County: Alba

Government
  - Mayor (2020–2024): Ioan Iancu Popa (PNL)
- Area: 44.28 km^{2} (17.10 sq mi)
- Elevation: 216 m (709 ft)
- Population (2021-12-01): 3,032
  - Density: 68.47/km^{2} (177.3/sq mi)
- Time zone: UTC+02:00 (EET)
  - Summer (DST): UTC+03:00 (EEST)
- Postal code: 517675
- Area code: (+40) 02 58
- Vehicle reg.: AB
- Website: comunasantimbru.ro

Sântimbru (Hungarian: Marosszentimre; German: Sankt Emmerich or Emerichsdorf) is a commune located in Alba County, Transylvania, Romania. It has a population of 3,032 as of 2021 and is composed of five villages: Coșlariu (Koslárd), Dumitra (Demeterpataka; German: Myttersdorf), Galtiu (Gáldtő), Sântimbru, and Totoi (Táté; German: Taters).

== Geography ==
The commune is located in central Alba County, 9 km (5.6 mi) north of the county seat, Alba Iulia. It is situated on the Transylvanian Plateau, at an altitude of 216 m (709 ft). It lies on the banks of the river Mureș; the river Galda flows into the Mureș in Sântimbru.

The national road DN1 and the European route E81 pass through the western side of the commune. The Podu Mureș train station in Coșlariu serves the CFR main line 300, which connects Bucharest with the Hungarian border near Oradea.

== History ==
Following the Mongol invasion of Europe, Transylvanian Saxons settled in Sântimbru in the 13th century. Driven out by the Ottomans in the 16th century, they were replaced by Hungarians, who practised woodcutting. Ethnic Romanians have been in the majority since the 19th century, and today, the inhabitants mainly build bricks and raise poultry.

The village of Totoi has developed a speech form known as Totoiana which consists in the inversion of Romanian words so that other speakers of normal Romanian cannot understand it. It is unique to the village, and it is not spoken in other parts of Sântimbru.

== Points of interest ==
The commune has a Hungarian Reformed church founded by John Hunyadi in 1449.

== Natives ==
Historical population
Year	Pop.	±%
1850	2,304	—
1900	2,960	+28.5%
1941	3,565	+20.4%
1992	2,661	−25.4%
2002	2,740	+3.0%
2011	2,723	−0.6%
2021	3,032	+11.3%
Source: INS, Census data

- Samoilă Mârza (1886–1967), photographer
- Andrei Socaci (born 1966-2026), weightlifter
