= Nucșoara =

- Commune
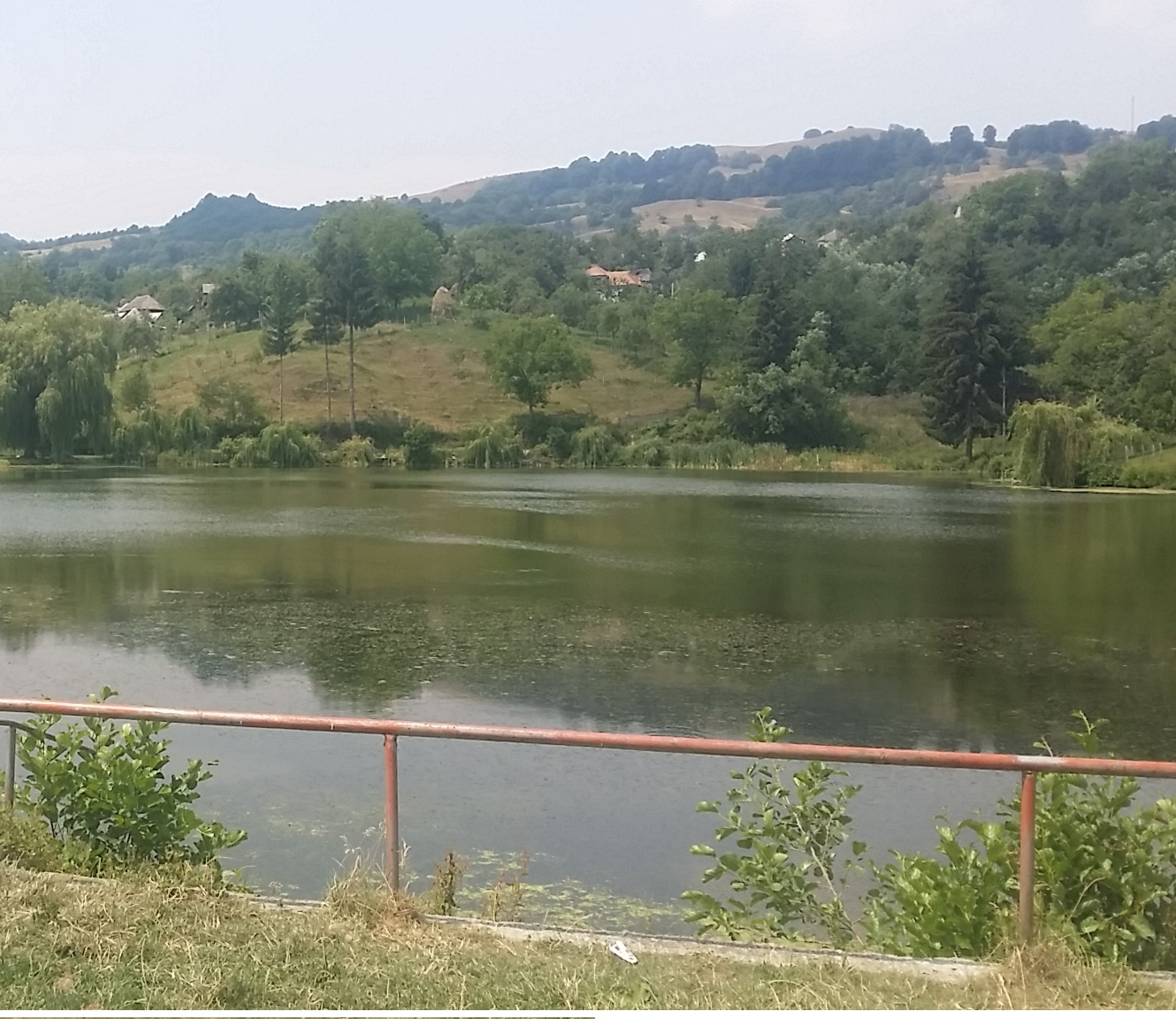
- Lake in Nucșoara

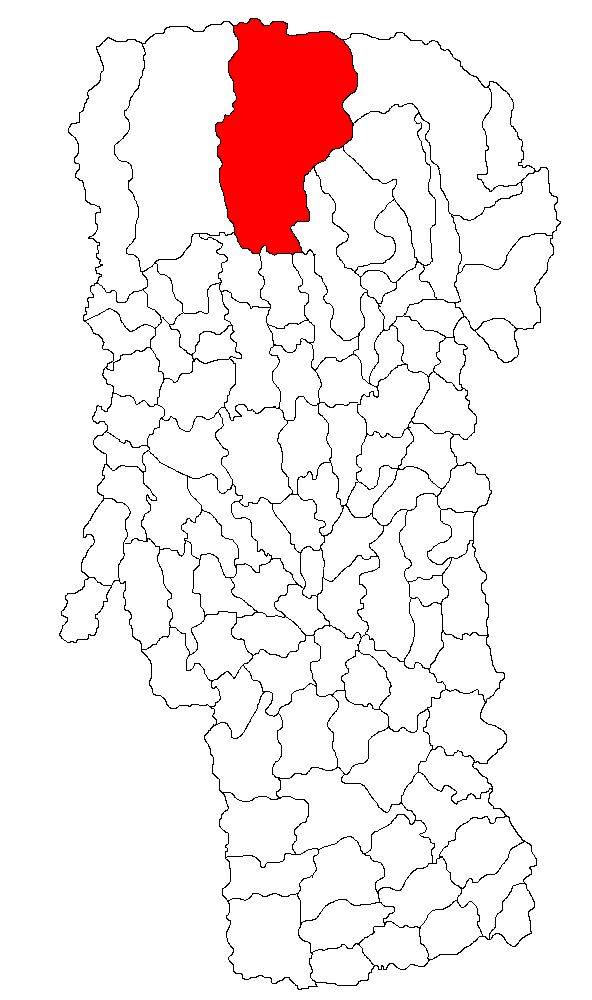
- Location in Argeș County

- Location in Romania
- Coordinates: 45°20′N 24°47′E
- Country: Romania
- County: Argeș

Government
  - Mayor (2020–2024): Ion Cojocaru (PSD)
- Area: 437.09 km^{2} (168.76 sq mi)
- Population (2021-12-01): 1,222
  - Density: 2.796/km^{2} (7.241/sq mi)
- Time zone: UTC+02:00 (EET)
  - Summer (DST): UTC+03:00 (EEST)
- Postal code: 117540
- Vehicle reg.: AG
- Website: primarianucsoara.ro

Nucșoara is a commune in Argeș County, Muntenia, Romania. It is composed of four villages: Gruiu, Nucșoara, Sboghițești and Slatina.

The commune is located in the northern part of the county, on the border with Brașov County. It is nestled on the southern slopes of the Făgăraș Mountains, at the foot of Moldoveanu Peak, the highest mountain peak in Romania. The Râul Doamnei river has its source in the area, and runs through Slatina and Sboghițești.

With a surface area of 437.09 km^{2} (168.76 sq mi), Nucșoara is the largest commune in Romania.

== Notable residents ==
- Toma Arnăuțoiu
- Elisabeta Rizea
- Bogdan Suceavă
