= Elisabeta Rizea =

Romanian activist (1912–2003)

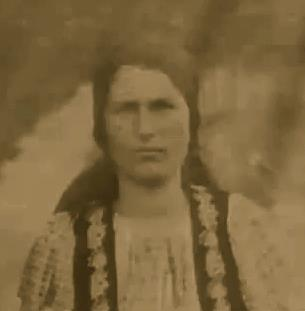
- Elisabeta Rizea, circa 1950
- Born: June 28, 1912; Domnești, Argeș County, Kingdom of Romania
- Died: October 4, 2003 (aged 91); Pitești, Romania
- Known for: Symbol of Romania's anti-communist resistance

Elisabeta Rizea (28 June 1912 – 4 October 2003) was a Romanian anti-communist partisan in the Făgăraș Mountains of northern Wallachia. After the Romanian Revolution of 1989, she became the symbol of Romania's anti-communist resistance. She was twice imprisoned for her activities, suffering extensive torture on the second occasion.

== Life ==
Rizea was born in 1912 in Domnești, a village in Argeș County in the Southern Carpathians, to a family of peasants, Ion and Maria Șuța, who lived off a plot of cultivated land. At the age of 19 she moved to a nearby village, Nucșoara, where she married Gheorghe Rizea, an employee of her uncle, Gheorghe Șuța.

After World War II, the Soviet Army imposed a Communist government in Romania. Rizea's uncle, a local leader of the National Peasants' Party, was reportedly killed by the secret police on the day of the elections, though sources disagree whether this happened in 1946 or 1948. This led Rizea's husband to join an anti-communist guerrilla group, Haiducii Muscelului, led by Colonel Gheorghe Arsenescu. Elisabeta provided the group with food and supplies. On the night of June 18, 1949, members of Arsenescu's group were ambushed by troops of the Securitate; in the ensuing firefight, two officers were killed, and the group escaped through a security cordon thrown around the area. As a result, a massive search was launched by Securitate troops and two army battalions. She was arrested for aiding the partisan group, beaten, and taken to Pitești Prison, where she was held for 18 months before being put on trial, and sentenced to seven year's imprisonment.

After being released from prison, she continued to provide food and information to the anti-communist fighters in the mountains. When Arsenescu was arrested in 1961, she was again tried, declared "dușman al poporului" (enemy of the people) and sentenced to 25 years, and she was sent to a penitentiary for female political prisoners in Mislea. Three years later, in 1964, she was freed under the terms of a general amnesty.

During the twelve years Rizea spent in prison, she was subjected to various forms of torture: according to her own declarations, she was hung by her hair from a hook and beaten until she fainted due to broken ribs, and was also scalped, burned, and beaten with a shovel. Upon her release from prison, she had no hair and she couldn't walk, as her knees had been destroyed by the torture.

After the fall of Communism in 1989, her story became known following an interview included in the 1992 documentary Memorialul Durerii by Lucia Hossu-Longin. In May 2001 the former King Michael I of Romania visited Rizea at her home in Nucșoara. During the visit, she told reporters, "When these wretched Communists came to power, they took everything from us, the land, the wooden carts — the hair off our heads. Still, what they could not take was our soul."

Rizea died in 2003 of viral pneumonia, at a hospital in Pitești.

== Legacy ==
In a 2006 poll conducted by Romanian Television to identify the "100 greatest Romanians of all time", she came in 58th. When there was a proposal to build a monument in memory of the anti-communist resistance, Rizea's name was the first on the list, and received the most support from Romanian civic organizations. As of 2019, there are plans to turn her house in Nucșoara into a museum. Today, one of her grandsons is a professor of differential geometry, Bogdan Suceava.

Streets in Iași, Nucșoara, Timișoara, and Voluntari are named after Rizea.
