= Toma Arnăuțoiu =

Romanian military officer

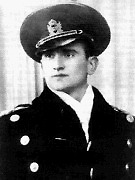
- Toma Arnăuțoiu in the uniform of the King’s Horse Guard Regiment – 1946
- Born: 14 February 1921; Nucșoara, Muscel County, Kingdom of Romania
- Died: 18 July 1959 (aged 38); Jilava Prison, Ilfov County, Romanian People's Republic
- Children: Ioana Raluca Voicu-Arnăuțoiu
- Relatives: Ion and Laurenția Arnăuțoiu (parents)
- Military career
- Allegiance: Kingdom of Romania
- Branch: Army
- Service years: 1942–1946
- Rank: Lieutenant
- Conflicts: World War II
- Awards: Order of the Crown (Romania)
- Other work: Leader of Nucșoara group of anti-communist resistance fighters (1949–1958)
- Website: www.tomaarnautoiu.ro

Toma Arnăuțoiu (14 February 1921 – 18 July 1959) was a Romanian officer who led a small group of anti-communist resistance fighters in the Southern Carpathian foothills between 1949 and 1958. It ended up as one of the most enduring resistance groups in Eastern Europe.

== Biography ==
=== Early life ===
Arnăuțoiu was born in the village of Nucșoara, Muscel County (now Argeș), Kingdom of Romania. He was the second son of schoolteacher Ion Arnăuţoiu and his wife, Laurenția. Starting in 1942 he attended the Cavalry School "King Ferdinand I" in Târgoviște, graduating fourth in his class in April 1944 with the rank of second lieutenant. He saw action in the fall of 1944, after Romania joined the Allied campaign against Germany as a result of King Michael's Coup. For his actions he was awarded on 4 November the Order of the Crown of Romania, knight class.

On 26 December 1944 Arnăuțoiu was wounded in action in Hungary. After spending three months in a hospital, he resumed military duties in the "Roșiori 5" cavalry regiment. On 20 June 1946 he was transferred to the King’s Horse Guard Regiment. Having been promoted to lieutenant on 6 August 1947, he was discharged only days later in a political purge of royalist officers.

=== Resistance years (1949–1958) ===
In January 1949, Arnăuțoiu met Gheorghe Arsenescu, a discharged colonel who had fought on the Eastern Front, to discuss the possibility of mounting an anti-communist resistance. They both resented the way the communist regime had been imposed by Moscow and the strong Soviet presence and influence in the country. They believed a war between the West and the Soviet Union was imminent, and partisans would be able to neutralise the local authorities and speed up the overthrow of the regime. In March, Colonel Arsenescu, having failed in a first attempt to organise a local resistance around Câmpulung and fearing arrest, joined Arnăuțoiu in Nucșoara to set up a group of anti-communist partisans in the surrounding hills. There they were joined by Toma’s brother Petre and his father Ion (Iancu) Arnăuțoiu, the teacher Alexandru Moldoveanu, the priest Ion Drăgoi and his student son, Cornel Drăgoi. Some of the meetings took place at the home of Gheorghe and Elisabeta Rizea. They were followed by 16 villagers, including four women. His sister, Elena Arnăuțoiu, also provided support to the resistance group.

The authorities got wind of what was being planned and first arrested Arnăuțoiu’s parents. Securitate (security police) troops then ambushed four members of the group; in the ensuing shoot-out two sub-officers were killed and Arnăuțoiu was wounded. The partisans managed to flee, but from then on there was hardly any way back for them. By July, they split fearing the group was too big to be able to hide from the troops combing the area. Disagreements over tactics also played a part. Some villagers stayed with Arsenescu, while others followed Arnăuțoiu. In November 1949 Arsenescu left his men, most of whom were later captured. He went into hiding at a farm until 1960, when he was caught and sentenced to death.

The Arnăuțoiu followers carried on for nine years. Constantly harassed by Securitate troops, their ranks were gradually depleted. Towards the end, the group was reduced to Arnăuțoiu, his younger brother Petre, Maria Plop (who had fled her village, Prisăcani, in Iași County when the Red Army arrived in 1944), and Constantin Jubleanu, whose mother had been killed while trying to flee a platoon, and whose father was in prison serving a 25-year sentence. They were constantly on the move and, with the support of villagers, managed to survive nine winters in the mountains. Their final hiding place was carved out on a rocky hillside, where a daughter was born in 1956 to Toma Arnăuțoiu and Maria Plop.

On 20 May 1958, the Arnăuțoiu brothers were ambushed and captured. They had been betrayed by Grigore Poenăreanu, a former school mate of Toma Arnăuțoiu who had given the two brothers a laced drink. Maria Plop, and the two year-old child were summoned to surrender and came down a ladder from the hideout the partisans had carved in a hill close to the village of Corbi. Jubleanu died in a shoot-out with the Securitate troops. A military court sentenced the Arnăuțoiu brothers to be shot alongside 14 villagers who had supplied them with food, medicine, clothing, a radio set, or weapons. The brothers were convicted of “acts of terror committed as part of an armed anti-communist resistance group”. The group was executed in the Jilava Prison on the night of 18/19 July 1959; Arnăuțoiu was shot at the order of the prison commander, lieutenant colonel Mihai Gheorghiu. More than 100 locals were sentenced to prison terms ranging from one year to hard labour for life. Elena Arnăuțoiu spent 7 years in detention. Maria Plop and Laurenția Arnăuțoiu died in the Miercurea Ciuc prison, while Ion Arnăuțoiu died in the Botoșani prison.

Ioana Raluca Voicu Arnăuțoiu, Maria Plop and Toma Arnăuțoiu's daughter, survived and in 2009 published a book about the group with photographs and documents from the Securitate archives.
