= Mărgău =

- Commune
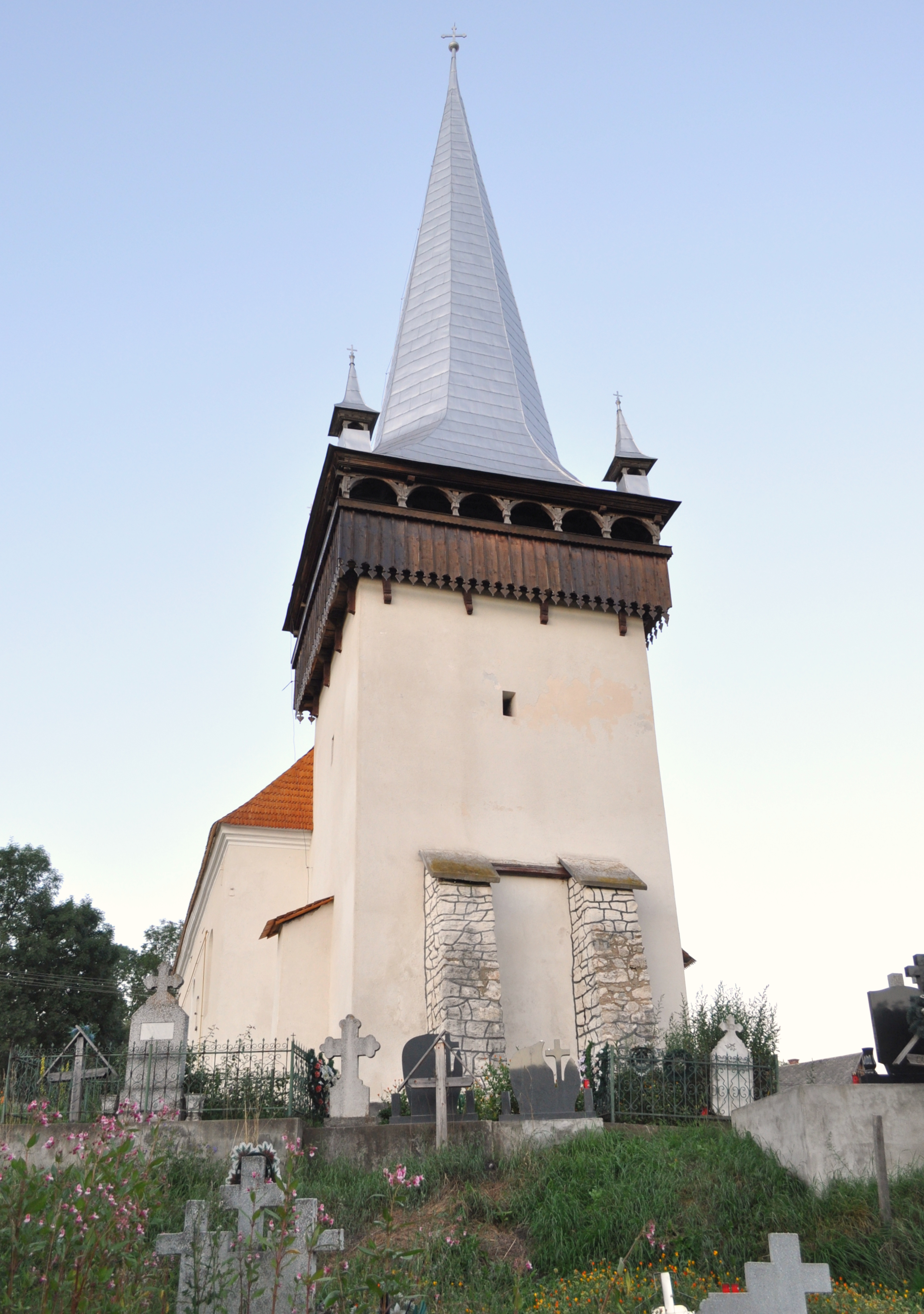
- Archangels church in Mărgău

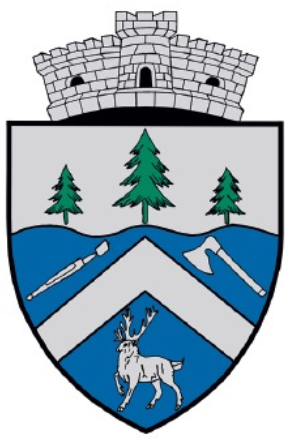
- Coat of arms

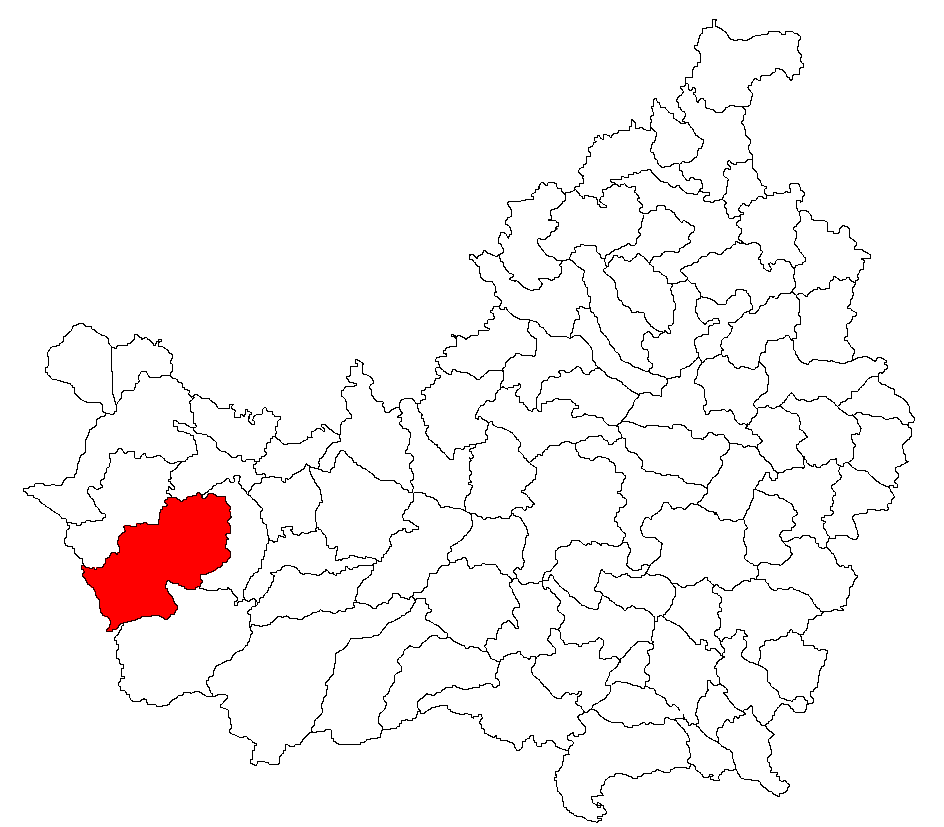
- Location in Cluj County

- Location in Romania
- Coordinates: 46°44′35″N 22°57′51″E
- Country: Romania
- County: Cluj
- Subdivisions: Bociu, Buteni, Ciuleni, Mărgău, Răchițele, Scrind-Frăsinet

Government
  - Mayor (2024–2028): Mircea-Sorin Suciu (PNL)
- Area: 211.68 km^{2} (81.73 sq mi)
- Elevation: 762 m (2,500 ft)
- Population (2021-12-01): 1,363
  - Density: 6.439/km^{2} (16.68/sq mi)
- Time zone: UTC+02:00 (EET)
  - Summer (DST): UTC+03:00 (EEST)
- Postal code: 407380
- Area code: (+40) 0264
- Vehicle reg.: CJ
- Website: primariamargau.ro

Mărgău (German: Meregau; Hungarian: Meregyó) is a commune in Cluj County, Transylvania, Romania. It is composed of six villages: Bociu (Bocs), Buteni (Kalotabökény), Ciuleni (Incsel), Mărgău, Răchițele (Havasrekettye), and Scrind-Frăsinet (Kőrizstető).

Răchițele village is the birthplace of former Romanian Prime Minister Emil Boc, currently Mayor of Cluj-Napoca, while Mărgău village is the birthplace of Iosif Capotă, a noted anti-communist resistance fighter from the early Communist era.

Mărgău is notable for the Gumuțeasca, an argot spoken in the commune created by the natives to speak between each other without outsiders understanding them when travelling around the country to sell their glass products, a traditional profession of the commune.

== Geography ==
Mărgău is located in the western part of Cluj County, on the border with Bihor County. It is situated at an altitude of 762 m (2,500 ft), in an area dominated by the Vlădeasa Massif.

== Demographics ==
According to the census from 2002, there were 1,869 people living in this commune; of this population, 99.62% were ethnic Romanians, 0.26% ethnic Hungarians, and 0.10% ethnic Roma. At the 2021 census, Mărgău had a population of 1,363, of which 88.63% were Romanians.

== Natives ==
- Emil Boc (born 1966), politician
- Iosif Capotă (1912–1958), physician, leader of an anti-communist resistance group
