= Romanian anti-communist resistance movement =

1944–1962 armed resistance movement against communist rule in Romania

- Part of World War II, the Cold War and anti-communist insurgencies in Central and Eastern Europe
- Map of Romania with armed resistance areas marked in red
Date	1944–1962
Location	Romania
Result	Romanian government victory; Insurgency suppressed; Anti-communist insurgency decisively defeated; Restoration of order and state control; Strengthening of postwar socialist consolidation

Belligerents
Kingdom of Romania (until 1947); Romanian People's Republic (from 1947); Romanian Communist Party; Securitate; Supported by: Soviet Union	Anti-communist groups; Nationalists; Monarchists; National Peasantists; Iron Guards; Supported by: United States; United Kingdom; CNR

Commanders and leaders
Gheorghe Gheorghiu-Dej; Gheorghe Pintilie; Alexandru Drăghici	Ion Gavrilă Ogoranu; Ioan Carlaonț # Vasile Motrescu (executed); Iosif Capotă (executed); Toma Arnăuțoiu (executed); Leon Șușman (DOW); Teodor Șușman †; Nicolae Dabija (executed); Aurel Aldea # Constantin Eftimiu # Victor Lupșa (executed); Gogu Puiu †

Units involved
Securitate; Directorate for Security Troops; Miliția	Haiducii lui Avram Iancu; Haiducii Muscelului; National Defence Front...and others

Strength
Several battalions	10,000 rebels

Casualties and losses
Unknown, but most likely light	2,000 killed Most of the army rebels executed Rest of them imprisoned

The Romanian anti-communist resistance movement began in 1944 as Soviet troops entered Romania and was active from the late 1940s to the mid-1950s, with isolated individual fighters remaining at large until the early 1960s. Armed resistance was the first and most structured form of resistance against the Romanian People's Republic, which in turn regarded the fighters as "bandits". It was not until the overthrow of Nicolae Ceaușescu in late 1989 that details about what was called "anti-communist armed resistance" were made public. It was only then that the public learned about the several small armed groups, which sometimes termed themselves "hajduks", that had taken refuge in the Carpathian Mountains, where some hid for ten years from authorities. The last fighter was eliminated in the mountains of Banat in 1962. The Romanian resistance was one of the longest lasting armed movements in the former Eastern Bloc.

Some academics argue that the extent and influence of the movement is often exaggerated in the post-communist Romanian media, memoirs of the survivors, and even historiography, while the authoritarian, antisemitic and/or xenophobic ideology of part of the groups are generally overlooked or minimized. Others, generally civic associations and former dissidents, argue that had external circumstances been different, and had the Western powers not permitted the Soviet Union to incorporate Romania and other countries from Eastern Europe into its sphere of domination, the anti-communist armed resistance could have led a successful war of national liberation. Still others, mainly former officials, former members of the Securitate secret police, as well as sympathizers of the communist government, label these clandestine groups as fascist, criminal, or anti-national elements subordinate to foreign Western interests seeking to destabilize the country. Some former resistance fighters (such as Ion Gavrilă Ogoranu, Gavrilă Vatamaniuc, and Lucreția Jurj) acknowledged after 1989 that they never posed a real threat to the communist government, and that their role was rather limited in maintaining an anti-communist climate in their local communities in the event of an American intervention.

== Preliminaries ==
=== Early resistance ===
In March 1944, the Red Army set foot in Bukovina, advancing into Romania, at the time an ally of Nazi Germany. Hundreds of people went into the forests forming anti-Soviet guerrilla groups of 15–20 people. A battalion was created and trained by the Wehrmacht to fight the NKVD; consisting exclusively of local volunteers, this unit, which reached up to 1,378 fighters, could not stem the tide. By August 1944, most were captured by the NKVD, who considered them "political war criminals", and deported them to forced labor camps in Siberia; the surviving partisans were killed or captured by March 1945. Scholar Andrei Miroiu notes that at least part of the partisans may have actually been German troops trapped behind enemy lines. As soon as September 12, 1944, the Romanian authorities were actively cooperating with the NKVD in capturing the partisans, surrendering them to the Soviet Army. According to Soviet sources, between 1944 and 1946, local authorities lost 2000 men in fights with the partisans, and the USSR had to use its forces to suppress them.

After the Allied armistice with Romania (11–12 September 1944), the Red Army had a free run in Romania and the Romanian government did not have authority over Northern Bukovina. In late 1944 and early 1945, some small armed groups were formed in Romania, with a mission of harassing the Red Army in a future war between the Soviets and the West. After the war, most of these groups dissolved while others remained in the mountains until 1948 when they became active. In May 1946, General Aurel Aldea, the former Minister of the Interior of the first Sănătescu cabinet, was arrested and charged with "bringing together various subversive organizations under his command". It appears, however, that the "National Resistance Movement", which he coordinated, did not pose much of an obstacle to the establishment of a pro-Soviet communist government.

=== Anti-communist demonstrations in Bucharest ===
On 8 November 1945, the last large-scale anticommunist demonstration occurred in Bucharest; tens of thousands of people, most of them members and supporters of the opposition parties, gathered in front of the Royal Palace to show their support for King Michael I of Romania and protest against the Petru Groza communist-dominated government. After the communists also sent in armed workers, violence erupted between the two groups; the Romanian soldiers in the Soviet Army fired warning shots and ultimately the crowd dispersed. During the event, 11 were killed and dozens injured, however, the shooters were not identified, with the government and opposition accusing each other. Later documents indicated that the communist Gheorghe Pintilie was among the ones who fired. After the elections of 1946, a coalescence of anti-communist forces led to a structure reuniting generals, senior officers, and politicians preparing and coordinating armed groups under a single command. The central coordinating structure inside Romania reported on this initiative to the Romanian National Committee residing in Paris, which in turn informed the Western governments. The project was eventually intercepted by the Romanian authorities, which subsequently carried out massive arrests in spring 1948, comprising up to 80% of those who were implicated in the movement. Thus, the coordinated national resistance was decapitated.

== Onset of the armed resistance movement ==
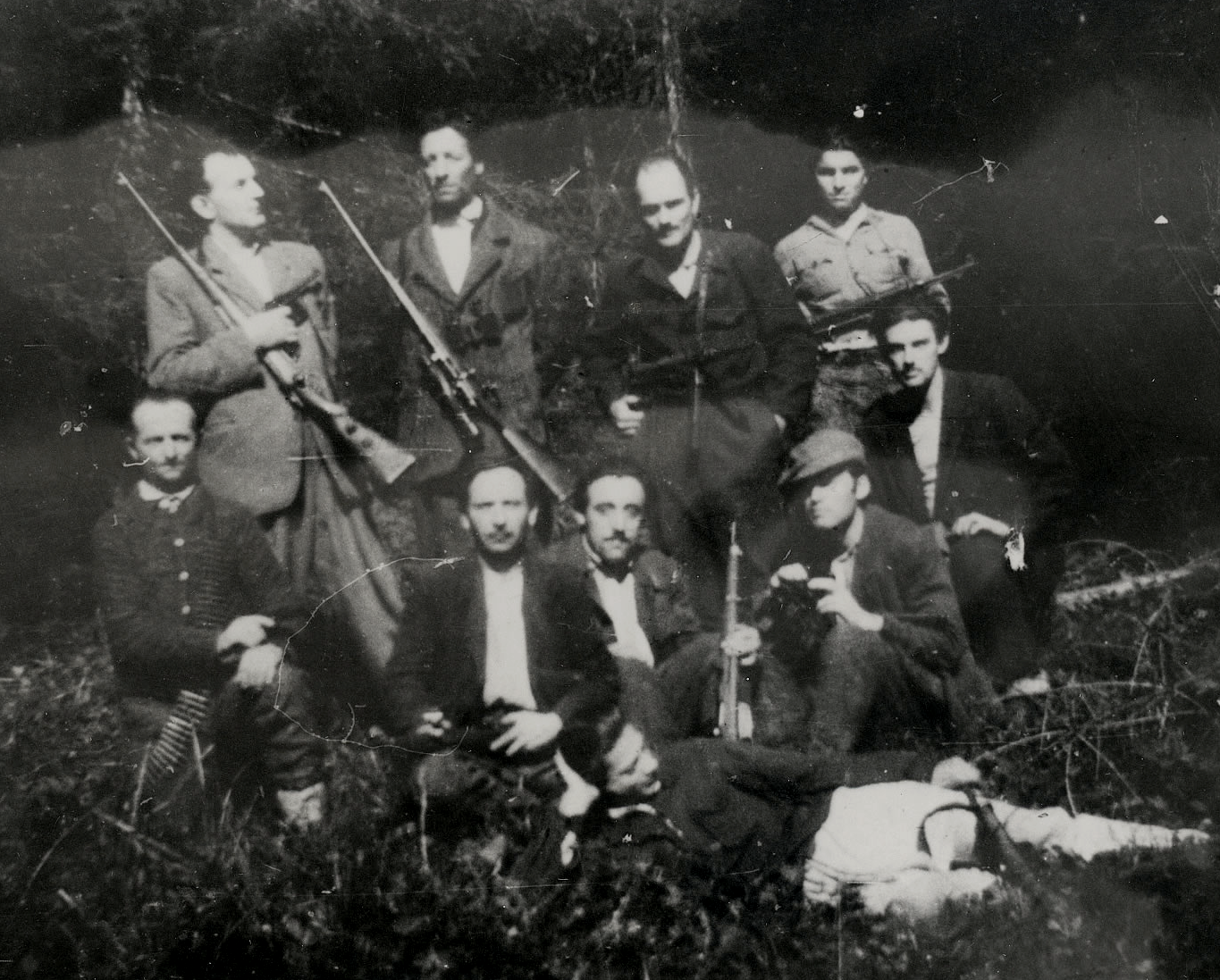
Gărzile lui Decebal, an anti-communist resistance group formed by members and sympathizers of the Iron Guard near Vatra Dornei. Photograph taken in September 1949 by an unknown Gărzile member, and preserved by the Securitate

However, starting with the summer of 1948, individuals or small groups went underground in the Carpathians, forming various units of armed resistance in what was a relatively large movement, gathering several thousand people. The rebels came from all social strata and all areas of the country, spreading everywhere the terrain could shield them. The movement was related to the spate of mass arrests hitting the country after the communists seized power on 30 December 1947, as well as to the political and economical measures which ruined a sizable part of the peasantry and the middle class.

There were several reasons for people seeking shelter in the mountains. While some went underground to escape imminent arrest, more generally people fled as they abandoned hope for surviving after being economically ruined and risking detention or worse. Significantly, entire families took flight in late 1948 and early 1949. Thus, the British consular official in Cluj, reporting on 1 May 1949 on the situation of partisans under the leadership of General Corneliu Dragalina noted that:

clothing and medicine are short and this is probably true as their numbers have been increased by a considerable proportion of women and children since the March 1st land expropriation. I have been given a figure as high as 20,000 as the number who has joined since the expropriation (...) The increase in the number of women and children will create problems of survival next winter (...) I am told now and again of lorries of army supplies going over to the partisans, sometimes by capture and sometimes by desertion, but I cannot say to what extent..."

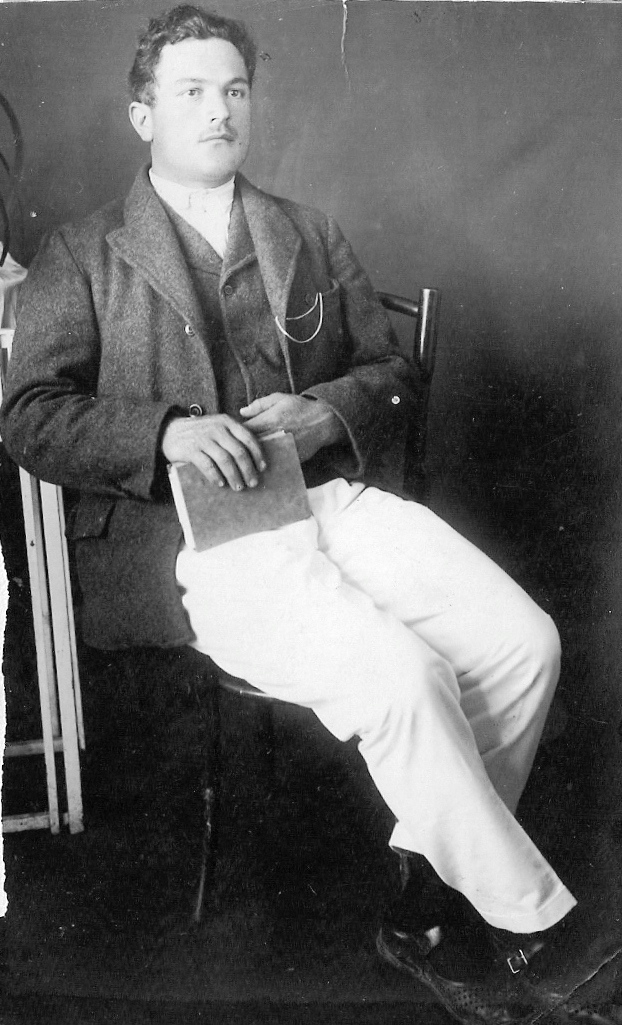
Teodor Șușman – anticommunist resistant of Apuseni Mountains

The members of the armed resistance did not identify themselves as "partisans", but hajduks, a word for generous highwaymen, considered folk heroes. A further major component of the armed resistance consisted of individuals and groups motivated by anti-communist convictions and persuaded that only an armed engagement could contain increasing terror and prevent an irrevocable communist takeover. Some of the resistance groups were led by ex-army officers and acted in a more coordinated and planned way. It appears that they put their hope in stirring up a more general armed insurrection, which never came to life. A smaller category of insurgents were Romanian refugees recruited in Europe by the Office of Policy Coordination (OPC), trained in France, Italy, and Greece and then dropped in the Carpathians. It seems, however, that most of them, not being able to create local contacts imperative for survival, were soon captured.

=== Rebel co-operation with the Central Intelligence Agency ===
The rebels had links with the Central Intelligence Agency (CIA), which conducted parachute missions in Romania in the early post-war years. At the beginning of 1949, the CIA through its Office of Policy Coordination (OPC) began to recruit displaced Romanians from West Germany, Austria, and Yugoslavia. Gordon Mason, the CIA station chief in Bucharest from 1949 to 1951, said that the smuggling of weapons, ammunition, radio transmitters, and medicine was organized. Agents smuggled into Romania by the CIA were to help organize the sabotage of factories and transport networks. Among the Romanian volunteers recruited by the CIA at the beginning of 1951 were Constantin Săplăcan, Wilhelm Spindler, Gheorghe Bârsan, Matias Bohm, and Ilie Puiu. They were the first to be parachuted, on the night of October 18 to 19, 1951, in the Făgăraș Mountains, but they were soon caught by the Securitate and executed (except for Bârsan, who committed suicide while in custody). The Securitate discovered that these men had been recruited in Italy by a former Romanian pilot. Following this, the Romanian Government sent a note to the United States protesting interference in the country's internal affairs, and that the captured CIA agents had been "sent to carry out acts of terrorism and espionage against the Romanian Army."

Later on, a two-man team was parachuted into Romania by the CIA on 2 October 1952 near Târgu Cărbunești in Oltenia. Three American-trained agents were sent in June 1953 to the Apuseni Mountains; they were later captured, but not executed, as the Romanian authorities intended to use them as double agents. In the Oradea-Satu Mare region, three airdropped agents were killed, one of them in a firefight and two others later executed.

== Resistance groups ==
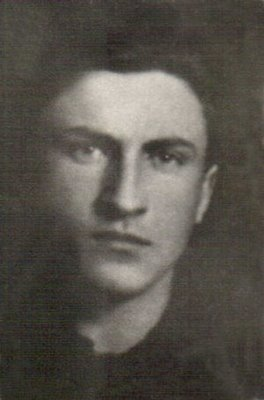
Ion Gavrilă Ogoranu, leader of Făgăraș Mountains movement

=== Ion Gavrilă Ogoranu ===
Ion Gavrilă Ogoranu, a member of the Iron Guard's youth wing who led a resistance group in the Făgăraș Mountains from 1948 to 1956, and remained undetected until 1976, worked out a set of defining traits of the typical Romanian resistance group. According to this author, such a group was rather small but could number up to 200 men, located in a mountainous/forested area which comprised some communities. Ogoranu further stated that such groups were supported by a significant number of inhabitants (up to several thousand), who provided shelter, food, and information.

=== Leon Șușman's resistance group ===
In the Apuseni Mountains region of Transylvania, the most active group was led by Leon Șușman, a former member of the Iron Guard who had been sentenced for his participation in the Legionnaires' rebellion and Bucharest pogrom. The group mainly hid in the woods and acquired part of its armament from an Iron Guard band that the Germans parachuted in the area in 1944–45. Suspicion within the group was high, and one of the members was shot in 1954 by his comrades. To eliminate this resistance group, the Securitate used informers against them and intercepted the correspondence of family members. The group was eliminated after an attack by Securitate troops, both sides suffering a casualty each during the battle. An armed group called "The National Defense Front-The Haiduc Corps" was headed by a former officer of the Royal Army who participated in the war against the Soviet Union on the Eastern Front, Major Nicolae Dabija. Resistants from this group robbed the Tax Office in Teiuș, armed with a rifle and handguns. The Securitate learned about the location of this group after an arrested resistant revealed their location on Muntele Mare and about their strength. The Securitate decided to attack the rebels on the morning of 4 March 1949; Securitate forces led by Colonel Mihai Patriciu charged the peak where the rebels were located, with a gunfight and later hand-to-hand combat occurring. The Securitate suffered three deaths and three others wounded, possibly also due to friendly fire. Seven or eleven partisans died in the battle, and further twelve were captured. Dabija escaped along with two others; however, he was arrested on 22 March 1949 after a local villager, whose barn he was sleeping in, notified the authorities of his presence. On 28 October 1949, seven members of the group, including Major Nicolae Dabija, were executed in Sibiu.

=== Infiltration of the resistance movement ===
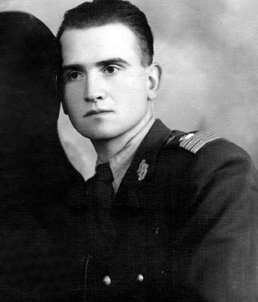
Lieutenant Toma Arnăuțoiu, leader of "Haiducii Muscelului", one of the most long-lived groups

Resistance groups were the target of systematic and enduring military actions from fully armed regular troops of the Securitate. The strength of the Securitate troops could vary from platoon to battalion up to regiment, including armoured vehicles, artillery, and occasionally even aviation. The insurgent groups sustained losses consisting of dead and wounded captured by the Securitate. They also fell victim to treason from supporters or infiltrated persons, which led to losses and captures. Gavrilă-Ogoranu states that some of the arrested rebels and their supporters were killed during interrogation, while other members of resistance groups were indicted in public or secret trials, and sentenced to death or prison. He estimates that several thousands of convictions were imposed. Capital punishment was carried out – either secretly, with bodies thrown into unknown common graves, or publicly in order to intimidate the local population. A significant number of detained rebels, who had not been sentenced to death, were killed outside prisons, under unexplained circumstances. In areas where the rebels were active, the population underwent systematic intimidation and terror from the state authorities.

== Structure and function ==
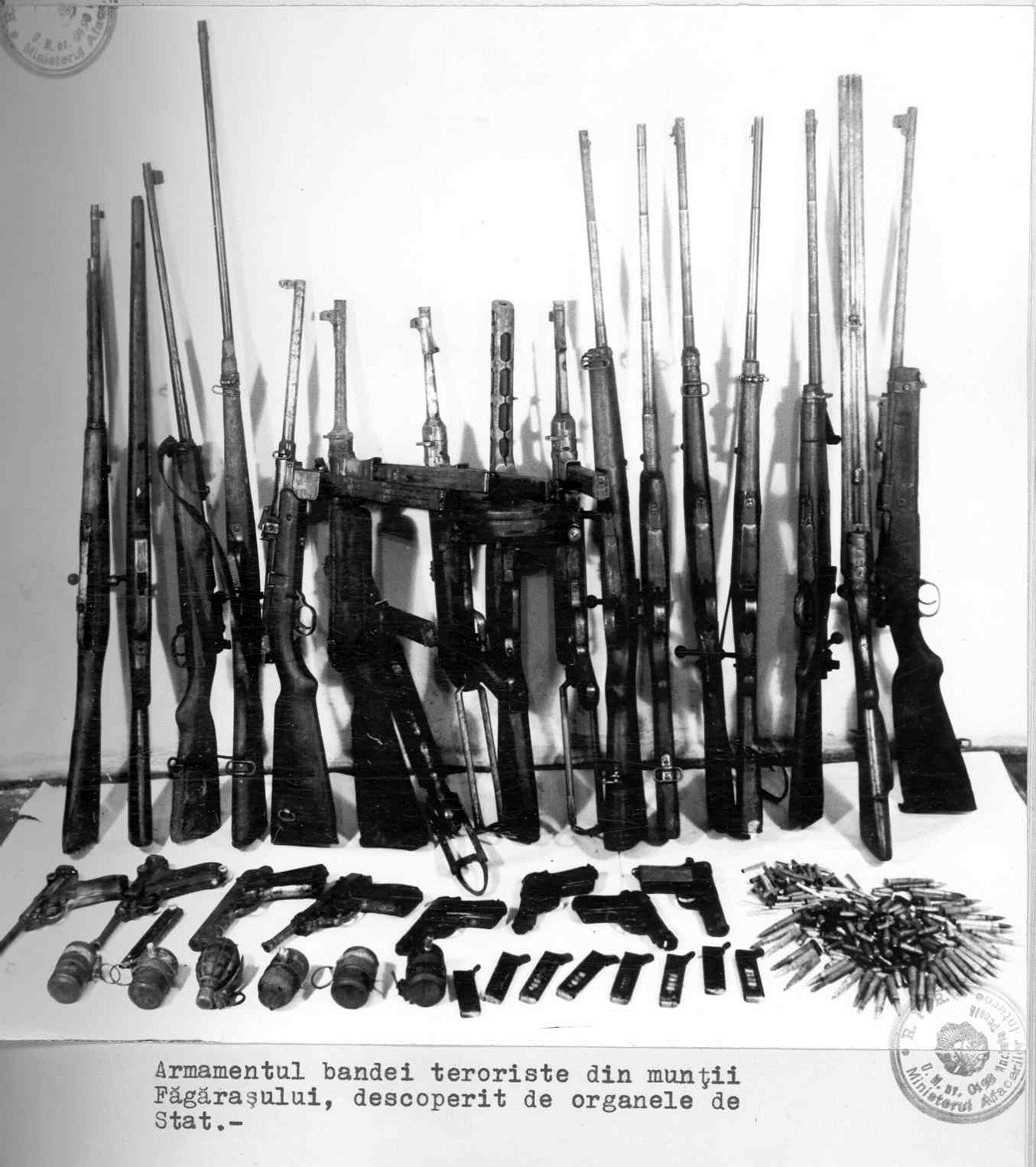
Weapons and ammunition of the anti-communist resistance group "Grupul Carpatin Făgărășan" seized by the Securitate around 1952

Dispersal, extent, and duration of the resistance rendered research after 1990 more difficult in ascertaining structural information on the movement. Evaluating the archives of the Securitate the CNSAS (National Council for the Study of the Securitate Archives) has assessed a provisional figure of 1196 resistance groups acting between 1948 and 1960. The size of the groups varied from small groupings of less than 10 members to intermediate sized groups counting around 40 fighters up to larger detachments of more than 100 men, with the highest distribution density placed around a strength of 15–20 men. According to these assumptions, the total number of active resistance fighters may not fall below 10,000 rebels, with an estimated figure of at least 40–50,000 supporting civilians. The number of killed victims on the insurgents' side could be established according to both archive data and various memoirs published after 1990. The archives revealed several hundred death penalties, yet a much larger number of resisters had been killed, either in battle or during different phases of detention. An estimated figure could amount to 2,000 lost lives.

The social structure of the insurgent groups was heterogeneous, comprising a considerable part of peasants, many students, and intellectuals as well as several army officers. A report of the Securitate from 1951 containing information on 804 arrested resistance members ranking among 17 "mountain bands" reveals the following: 63% of people who participated in the anti-communist insurgency had no political affiliation. 37% of people who participated in the insurgency had a political affiliation: 11% National Peasants' Party, 10% Ploughmen's Front, 9% Iron Guard, 5% Communist Party, 2% National Liberal Party.

== List of resistance groups ==
The territorial structure of the resistance covered mainly the mountainous and heavy forested parts of the country. A list of some of the most important resistance groups and their location:

Area	Name of the group/group leader
Maramureș	Aristina Pop-Săileanu (in the Țibleș Mountains); Gavrilă Mihali Ștrifundă; Vasile Popșa; Ilie Zubașcu; Ion Ilban; Nicolae Pop; Vasile Dunca; Gavrila Iusco; group of Uniate priests
Bucovina	Bucovina Regional Battalion; Constantin Cenușă, Vasile Motrescu; Col. Vasile Cârlan; Grigore Sandu; Vasile Cămărușă; Partisan group Gavril Vatamaniuc (Gavril Vatamaniuc; Ion Vatamaniuc), Vladimir Macoveiciuc, Petru Maruseac, Ion Chiraș, and Gheorghe Chiraș; Gărzile lui Decebal (Gheorghe Vasilache, Filaret Gămălău), Dragoș Flocea, Andrei Ghivnici, and Silvestru Harsmei.
Crișul Alb River and Arad	National Liberation Movement; Valer Șirianu; Adrian Mihuțiu; Gligor Cantemir; Ion Lulușa
Bistrița-Năsăud/Rodna Mountains	Haiducii lui Avram Iancu–Sumanele Negre (Capt. Gavril Olteanu); White Guard (Leonida Bodiu)
Apuseni Mountains	National Defence Front – Hajduk Corps (Maj. Nicolae Dabija, brothers Macavei); Leon Șușman group (Simion Roșa, Gheorghe Șușman, Vasile Crișan, Ilie Vlad, Teodor Trânca, Vasile Răfăilă, Andrei Bicuț); Teodor Șușman group (Teodor Șușman (junior), Avisalon Șușman, Traian Șușman); Acft. Capt. Diamandi Ionescu group (Gheorghe Spulbatu); Capotă-Dejeu group (Dr. Iosif Capotă, Dr. Alexandru Dejeu); Ștefan Popa group; Sandu Maxim group; Cross and Sword Organization (Gheorghe Gheorghiu Mărășești); Ion Cârja; Ioan Robu; Ioan Crișan and Leon Abăcioaiei; Aron and Vasile Spaniol
Cluj	Gheorghe Pașca; Alexandru Podea; Maj. Emil Oniga; Cornel Deac; White Army (Capt. Alexandru Suciu)
Bacău	Vasile Corduneanu; Uturea group (Gheorghe Ungurașu, Petre Baciu)
Banat	Col. Ion Uță; Spiru Blănaru; Aurel Vernichescu; Acft. Cdr. Petru Domășneanu; Nicolae Popovici; Gheorghe Ionescu; Petru Ambruș; Great Romania Partisans; brothers Blaj; Ion Tănase; Dumitru Isfănuț (Sfârlogea); Nicolae Doran; Ion Vuc; Ioan Ienea
Hunedoara	Lazăr Caragea; Petru Vitan
Sibiu	Resistance point Fetea
Covasna	Vlad Țepeș Organization (Victor Lupșa, Gheorghe Corneliu Szavras)
Brașov	Vlad Țepeș Organization
Vrancea Mountains	Vrancea group (brothers Paragină); Gheorghe Militaru; Vlad Țepeș Organization (Victor Lupșa); Acft. Capt. Mândrișteanu
Neamț County	Iustin Pârvu, Grigore Caraza, Gen. Dumitru Coroamă, Ioasaf Marcoci, Nicolae Grebenea
Bârlad	Constantin Dan
Northern Făgăraș Mountains	Dumitru (Ionele Ion); Făină; Ion Cândea; Făgăraș Carpathian Group (Ion Gavrilă Ogoranu)
Southern Făgăraș Mountains	Haiduks of Muscel (Col. Gheorghe Arsenescu, Toma Arnăuțoiu, Petru Arnăuțoiu, Elisabeta Rizea); Șerban-Voican group in Muscel area between 1951 and 1957; Dumitru Apostol group
Gorj	Capt. Mihai Brâncuși
Vâlcea	Arnota partisans (Gheorghe Pele, Ion Oprițescu); Șerban Secu; Ion Jijie
Craiova	Gen. Ioan Carlaonț; Col. Gheorghe Cărăușu; Col. Ștefan Hălălău; Radu Ciuceanu; Marin Dumitrașcu
Dobruja	Haiducii Dobrogei (Gogu Puiu; Nicolae Ciolacu; Fudulea brothers); Vulturii Daciei

Rather than a planned action, the resistance movement was a spontaneous reaction in response to the wave of terror initiated by the authorities after the seizure of power in early 1948. The spontaneous nature of the movement explains its marked fragmentation and the lack of coordination between the resistance groups. However, acting isolated and on a local basis conferred the groups a multiformity and flexibility which rendered the annihilation of the entire movement more difficult, and ensured a remarkable staying power for some groups. Furthermore, in some areas a notable reproducibility occurred, exterminated groups being replaced by new cores of resistance.

A characteristic trait of the movement was its defensive nature. Indeed, few offensive actions such as sabotages or occupation of localities have been recorded. While the groups did not pose a major material threat to the authorities, their dangerousness for the government resided in the symbol they represented: as long as the resisters remained free, they created a tangible challenge to the government's claim of exercising total control over the country.

== Repression ==
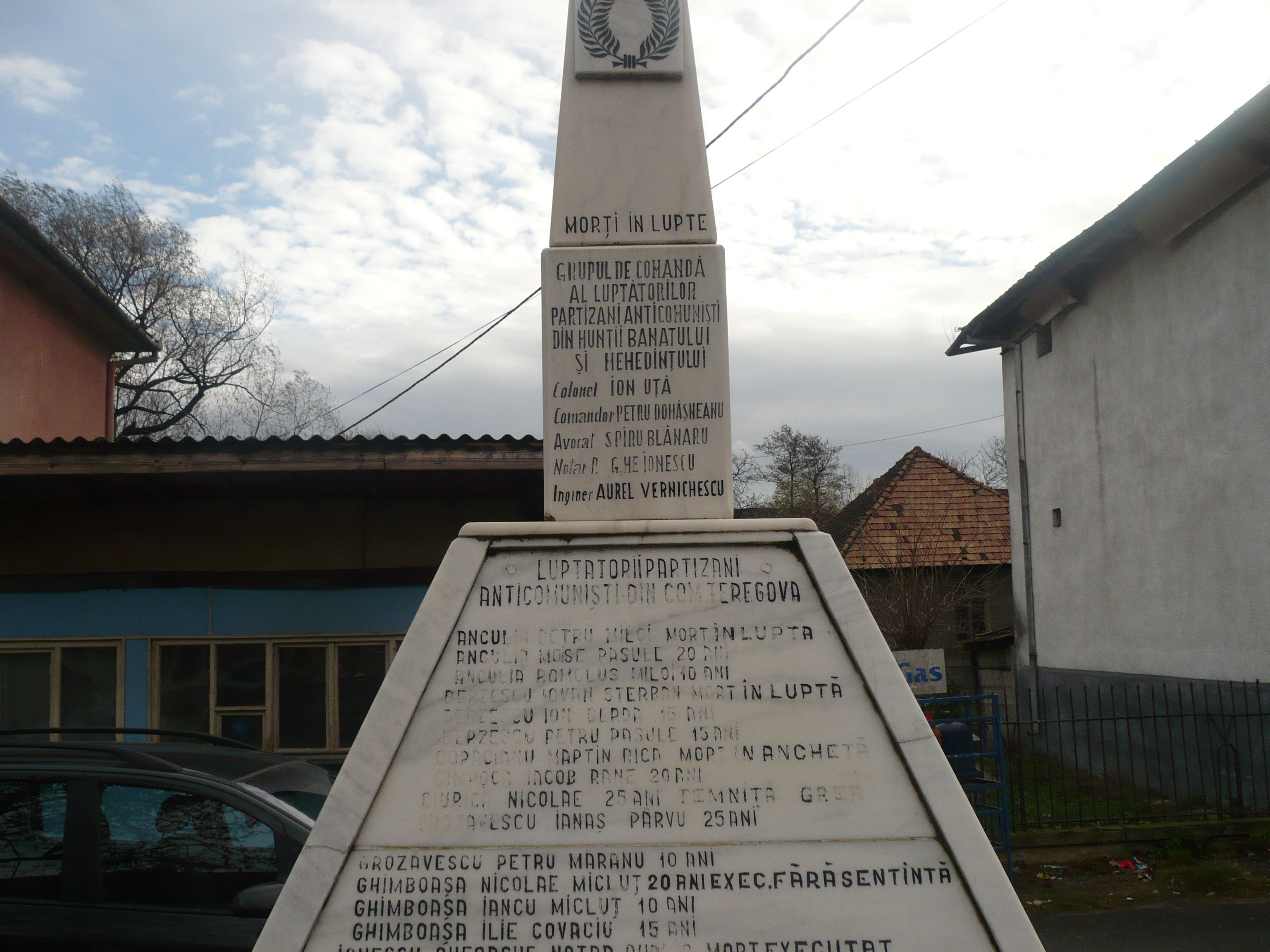
Memorial in Teregova commemorating anti-communist partisans in the Banat Mountains and the Mehedinți Mountains

Adriana Georgescu Cosmovici was one of the first people to be arrested for belonging to the resistance movement. In July 1945, the 28-year-old woman was arrested in Bucharest, and severely beaten by the secret police investigators. In a statement made in Paris in 1949, she named three investigators as having threatened her with guns, one of them being Alexandru Nicolschi. According to a 1992 article for Cuvântul, Nicolschi ordered in July 1949 the murder of seven prisoners (allegedly the leaders of an anti-communist resistance movement) in transit from Gherla Prison.

Elisabeta Rizea and her husband, two peasants opposed to the government's policy of forced collectivization, joined the guerrilla group "Haiducii Muscelului" led by Colonel Gheorghe Arsenescu, providing food and supplies. Caught in 1952, she served 12 years in prison, during which time she was subjected to torture. Historian Radu Ciuceanu joined the "National Resistance Movement" in 1946; centered in Craiova, the resistance group was led by general Ioan Carlaonț and colonels Gheorghe Cărăușu and Ștefan Hălălău. Arrested in 1948 and held in prison until 1963, Ciuceanu was subjected to a re-education program which involved severe beatings and harsh conditions of detention.

By the late 1950s, the resistance movement was in shambles. Romanian counter-insurgency operations had almost completely destroyed the guerrilla insurgency.

On 18 July 1958, Vasile Motrescu was executed in Botoșani. In 1959, 80 people led by Vasile Blănaru were tried for "armed insurrection" in the area of Câmpulung Muscel.

By the early 1960s, most of the anti-communist partisans in Romania were either killed or arrested. All influential or popular rebel leaders had been executed or captured. There were a few isolated guerrillas, but they either gave up fighting, went into hiding, or were simply executed after being captured by the Romanian Securitate.

The Romanian Security Forces succeeded in defeating rebel forces due to coordination between the Securitate and militia forces, as well the penetration of the insurgent groups with the use of informers, intelligence gathering, and persuasion. The implacable chase of the authorities on the resisters as well as the gag order on the existence of the resistance show how concerned the government was, that the symbol of political insubordination might become contagious.

== In memoriam ==
Anti-communist resistance monument in front of the House of the Free Press

In 2016, a monument dedicated to the anti-communist resistance in Romania and Bessarabia was unveiled in front of the House of the Free Press, in Bucharest, close to the spot where a statue of Vladimir Lenin was between 1960 and 1990. The sculpture, which is 20 metres (66 ft) tall and weighs 100 tons, is called "Wings" (Aripi); it was done by sculptor Mihai Buculei, whose father was a political prisoner at Aiud Prison.

The Monument to the Anti-Communist Resistance in Cluj-Napoca was inaugurated in 2006 and is the work of architect Virgil Salvanu. It is a cube made of concrete, covered with white marble; on its sides, on plaques made of black marble, are the names of those prisons where members of the anti-communist resistance were incarcerated. There is also a memorial in Teregova commemorating anti-communist partisans in the Banat and Mehedinți mountains.

The Memorial of the Victims of Communism and of the Resistance in Sighetu Marmației houses the Sighet Memorial Museum, honoring the political prisoners who were detained at Sighet Prison, many of whom died there.

== See also ==
- Brașov Rebellion
- Romanian Revolution
- Anti-Soviet partisans
- Vin americanii!
- Anti-communist insurgencies in Central and Eastern Europe
- Ioanid Gang
