= Păun =

Păun (meaning "peacock") may refer to:

- Păun, a village in Mihălăşeni Commune, Botoşani County, Romania
- Păun, a village in Bârnova Commune, Iaşi County, Romania
- Păun (surname), Romanian
- Romanian given name
  - Păun Otiman (born 1942), Romanian agricultural scientist and economist

== See also ==
- Paun Rohovei (born 1970), Ukrainian Romanian diplomat
