= Mironescu =

Mironescu is a Romanian surname. Notable people with the surname include:

- Alexandru Mironescu (1903–1973), Romanian prose writer
- Gheorghe Mironescu (1874–1949), Romanian politician
- I. I. Mironescu (1883–1939), Romanian prose writer and physician
