= Lucia Apolzan =

Romanian ethnographer (1911–2001)

Lucia Florica Apolzan (15 February 1911 – 2001) was a Romanian anthropologist, educator, ethnologist, geographer, folklorist, memorialist, educator, poet, and sociologist, an interdisciplinary researcher of the Romanian hill and mountain village, of the ancestral civilization on the territory of Romania, as well as of its uninterrupted continuity in the territories where the Romanian language is spoken. She was considered the right-hand collaborator of sociologist Dimitrie Gusti, but with her own distinct personality. Called by many the Lady of the Carpathians, Apolzan was a thorough and tenacious researcher of the Romanian village.

== Biography ==
Apolzan was born in 1911 in Sibiu. She was an orphan raised by a grandmother and came from a family of fierce Transylvanian peasants.

She graduated in geography from the Babeș-Bolyai University of Cluj, where she was a close collaborator of Romulus Vuia, creator of the Ethnographic Museum of Transylvania. She went on to study at the University of Bucharest, and earn her doctorate in sociology (magna cum laude) with her mentor Dimitrie Gusti.

With her doctorate in hand, she began field research.

"Between 1942 and 1943, she was sent by the Central Institute of Statistics to Plasa Câmpeni in the Apuseni Mountains, where she researched with great success the scattered settlements – grove settlements. She was part of the team of sociologists and ethnographers coordinated by Henri H. Stahl and Anton Golopenția, after the Second World War, when she studied the popular costume from Hodac and the Maramureș region."

Apolzan was one of the many interwar Romanian intellectuals and people of value who were persecuted (in various forms, from abuse and harassment to imprisonment and death sentences) by the communist state of Romania. When she was ostracized by the communist regime, she was punished by being sent to do "low-level work," at the Apaca weaving mill, where she spent several years until 1956 when she was allowed to return to the Central Institute of Statistics.

In 1967 she became a member of the complex research team of the Danube Gorge – called Iron Gates I, studying ethnography in the area of the Almaju and Mehedinți Mountains in Romania.

== Interdisciplinary research ==
=== Land of stone ===
Lucia Apolzan's most important revelations are found in the complex field of anthropological interdisciplinary study of the continuity of habitation of the Carpathian lands for thousands of years. Her first complex study was on the Land of Moților or the Land of Stone, an ethnogeographical region of the Apuseni Mountains. She published her research on folk costumes, myths, landscapes and animals only after she had traveled the entire region on foot.

=== The Luncan Platform ===
This platform is part of the Șureanu Mountains. It was shaped throughout the Pliocene to the Early Pleistocene, resulting in an undulating surface. According to her writings, Apolzan was warmly urged by geographer Ion Conea, author of the work Clopotiva, a village in Hațeg, to visit the Luncan Platform, promising Apolzan that she "will be disturbed."

Her resulting work, published in 1987, The Carpathians, a treasure trove of history: The Perpetuity of settlements scattered on the heights, shows clear evidence of her deep anthropological, cultural and ethnological study of the area. She held a firm belief that "the Carpathians were inhabited steadily, uninterruptedly."

== Personal life ==
Apolzan was married to Horia Sebastian Stanca. She died in 2001 and he followed a few months later.

== Selected honors ==
The Orăștie Museum of Ethnography and Folk Art, a section of the Museum of Dacian and Roman Civilization in Deva, opened a temporary exhibit in December 2022 called: "The Great Lady of Romanian Ethnography – Lucia Apolzan."

== Selected works ==
- 1975 – The Iron Gates Complex Atlas, Bucharest
- 1977 – The Luncani Platform. Aspects of the antiquity and continuity of the settlements, in "Sargetia", Deva Museum Yearbook", pages 487–508
- 1979 – Grouping of settlements according to economic and social evolution. The Iron Gates area, between Baziaș and Drobeta Turnu-Severin, Bucharest, in "Studies and Communications in Ethnography and History", Caransebeș, pages 83–108
- 1980 – Dimitrie Gusti: critical studies, Bucharest, Scientific and Encyclopedic Publishing House, 383 pages, Coordinator Henri H. Stahl; authors: Lucia Apolzan, Ovidiu Bădina, Alexandru Bărbat, et al.; chapter "Editorial activity of professor D. Gusti"
- 1987 – The Carpathians, a treasure trove of history. The Perpetuity of Settlements Scattered on the Heights, Bucharest. Scientific and Encyclopedic Publishing House, 383 pages
- 1998 – Roads, trials, accomplishments. Memoirs, Bucharest, Romanian Cultural Foundation Publishing House, 341 pages
