= Cantemir Vodă National College =

- Colegiul Național "Cantemir Vodă"
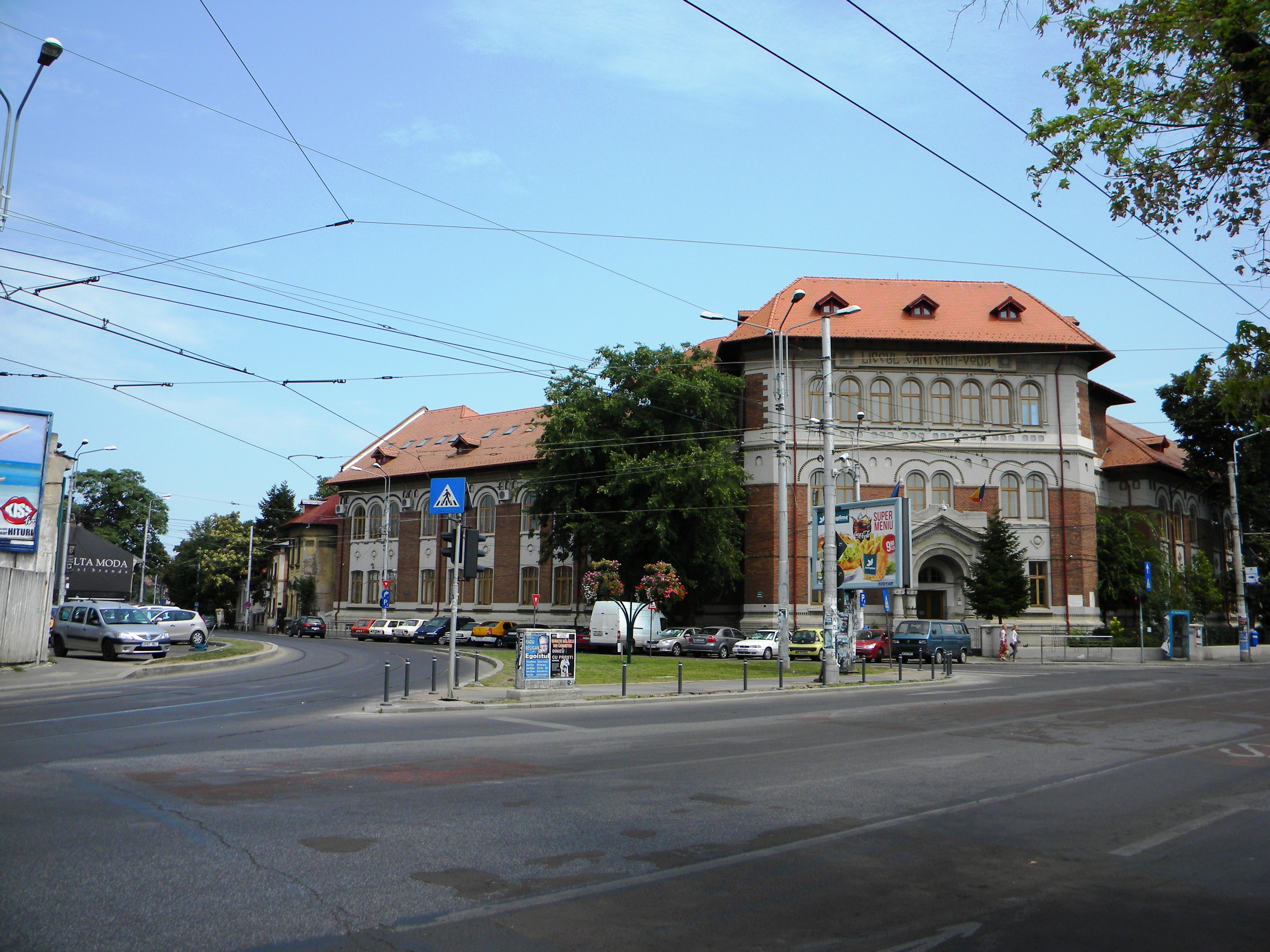

Location
- Strada Viitorului, Nr. 60, Sector 2 Bucharest; Romania
- Coordinates: 44.445519°N 26.112772°E

Information
- Former name: Liceul Dimitrie Cantemir
- Type: Public
- Established: 1868
- Director: Mihai Alexandru
- Nickname: Cantemir
- Website: www.cncv.ro

The Cantemir Vodă National College (Romanian: Colegiul Național Cantemir Vodă) is a high school located at 60 Viitorului Street Bucharest, Romania. It was founded on October 27, 1868. At the 2024 evaluation of Romanian secondary schools, it came in 13th place, with a score of 9.41/10.

The school building is listed as a historic monument by Romania's Ministry of Culture and Religious Affairs.

== Notable alumni ==
- Petre Antonescu
- Ștefan Bănică Sr.
- Radu Boroianu
- Nicolae Brânduș
- George Călinescu
- Anda Călugăreanu
- Mircea Cărtărescu
- Vladimir Colin
- Mihai Constantin
- Ion G. Duca
- Emil Hossu
- George Iacobescu
- Haralamb Lecca
- Ștefan Luchian
- Alexandru Mironescu
- Șerban Papacostea
- Cincinat Pavelescu
- Lucian Pintilie
- Vlad Rădescu
- Șerban Rădulescu-Zoner
- Henri H. Stahl
- Răzvan Theodorescu
- Mihai Zamfir
- George Mihail Zamfirescu

== Notable teachers ==
- Nicolae Bănescu
- Dan Barbilian
- Gheorghe Bogdan-Duică
- Charles Drouhet
- Constantin Giurescu
- Traian Lalescu
- Vasile Păun
- Horia Stamatu
- I. E. Torouțiu
