= I. E. Torouțiu =

Romanian literary historian

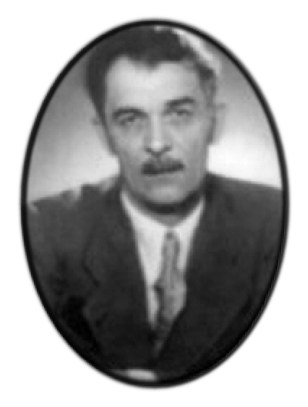
Ilie Toroutiu

Ilie E. Torouțiu (June 17, 1888 – November 24, 1953) was an Austro-Hungarian-born Romanian literary historian.

Born into a poor peasant family in Solca, then part of Austrian-ruled Bukovina, he did well in primary school, and a teacher advised him to leave for Suceava and learn a trade. He did so at age fourteen, finding work at a printing press, where the boss noticed his interest in books and helped him obtain a scholarship. He entered the local Greek Orthodox High School in the autumn of 1902. He excelled as a student, including in German language and literature, while having to spend his free time at the press so as not to lose his scholarship. After graduating in 1910, he enrolled at the literature and philosophy faculty of Czernowitz University. A gifted student, he drew notice from rector Matthias Friedwagner, who arranged a scholarship at the Academy for Social and Commercial Studies in Frankfurt. In 1913, he taught Romanian there. He then became a teacher at Cantemir High School in Bucharest, capital of the Romanian Old Kingdom. Until 1916, he edited Bucovina, a newspaper for emigrants from his home province. His first book appeared in 1911; this was A fost odată, a collection of folk tales and songs. Magazines that published his work include Convorbiri Literare, Sămănătorul, Ramuri, Făt-Frumos, Floarea-soarelui, Litere and Pagini de istorie și critică literară.

When Bucharest was occupied by the Central Powers at the end of 1916, he withdrew to Iași. There, he agitated against the spring 1918 Treaty of Bucharest. After the war, he returned to the national capital, where he established Bucovina publishing house, which he put to effective use for the benefit of other writers. He headed Convorbiri Literare during the last phase of its first run (1939-1944). Torouțiu published numerous works of literary history. His magnum opus is the thirteen-volume Studii și documente literare, which appeared between 1931 and 1946, spanning some 8,000 pages and leading Perpessicius to call him "a Hurmuzachi of literary history". The first volume was done in collaboration with Gheorghe Cardaș; the remainder, alone. The work includes documents and pieces of literary history he found in his personal library, in archives and in institutions. He was elected a corresponding member of the Romanian Academy in 1936; the new communist regime stripped him of membership in 1948. Additionally, due to the pro-Nazi Germany line Convorbiri Literare had taken during World War II, he was barred from publishing in 1945. Wracked by terminal illness, he died at his Bucharest home; his wife committed suicide the following day.

He translated works by Ludwig Anzengruber, John Bunyan, Otto Funcke, Franz Grillparzer, Christian Friedrich Hebbel, Plato and J. C. Ryle. He collected folklore from Bukovina and published studies about its economy, as well as writing literary criticism. Since 1991, the library in Torouțiu's native town has borne his name.
