= Gheorghe Cardaș =

Romanian literary historian (1899–1983)

Gheorghe Cardaș (1899 – 1983) was a Romanian literary historian.

Born in Drăgușeni, Suceava County, his parents were Gheorghe Cardaș and his wife Amalia (née Camondo), and he came from an intellectual family. He attended primary school in his native village and the nearby rural localities Topile and Siliștea. Cardaș then attended high school at Fălticeni (1913–1915), Bucharest (1915–1916) and Roman (1917–1921). In 1924, he obtained a degree from the literature and philosophy faculty of the University of Bucharest. He later took specialized courses on the history of Romanian literature at Bucharest and in comparative literature at the University of Paris from 1926 to 1927. A high-level clerk at the Romanian Academy Library from 1921 to 1933, he was a teaching assistant at the University of Bucharest from 1932 to 1943 and a scientific researcher at the Romanian Academy's history institute from 1950 to 1953; also a Member of the Writers' Union of Romania. From 1958 to 1964, under the communist regime, Cardaș was imprisoned at Jilava and Gherla prisons.

Cardaș' first published work consisted of folkloric texts that appeared in the Bârlad magazine Ion Creangă in 1916. He was an editor at Mișcarea literară (1924–1925), Albina (1921–1941), and the Buftea Revista Liceului Internat (1934–1939). His contributions appeared in Adevărul literar și artistic, Boabe de grâu, Convorbiri Literare, Cugetul românesc, Făt-Frumos, Manuscriptum, Mitropolia Olteniei, Neamul românesc pentru popor, Prietenii istoriei literare, Revista de etnografie și folclor, Revista istorică, Revista macedo-română, Universul literar, Vestitorul satelor, and Viața Românească.

Cardaș authored a compendium on the history of Romanian literature. He put together numerous anthologies with good judgment and philological rigor, prefacing them with detailed studies. He devoted a good part of his activity to document-based literary history. He was the first to publish two works by Ion Budai-Deleanu: the second variant of Țiganiada in 1925, and the poem Trei viteji in 1928. He supervised publication of document collections, alone (Documente literare, vol. I, 1971; vol. II, 1973) or together with I. E. Torouțiu (Studii și documente literare, vol. I, 1931). He also published collections featuring poems by Bogdan Petriceicu Hasdeu and the tales of Ion Creangă and Petre Ispirescu.
