= Păun (surname) =

The Romanian-language surname Păun (meaning "peacock") may refer to:

- Emilian Galaicu-Păun
- Gabriel Badea-Päun
- Georgian Păun
- Gheorghe Păun
- Ion Păun
- Ion Păun-Pincio
- Nicolae Păun (politician)
- Nicolae Păun (footballer)
- Paul Păun, Romanian and Israeli avant-garde poet and visual artist
- Vasile Păun
