= Drăgușeni, Suceava =

Drăgușeni
- Commune
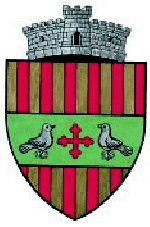
- Coat of arms

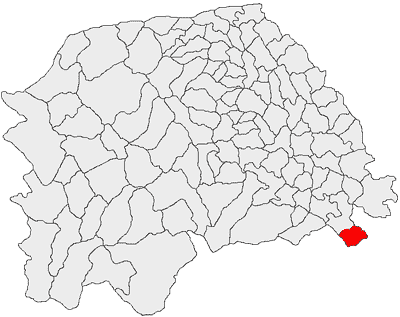
- Location in Suceava County

- Location in Romania
- Coordinates: 47°17′N 26°30′E
- Country: Romania
- County: Suceava
- Subdivisions: Drăgușeni, Broșteni, Gara Leu

Government
  - Mayor (2024–2028): Vasile Cepoi (PSD)
- Area: 29 km^{2} (11 sq mi)
- Elevation: 303 m (994 ft)
- Population (2021-12-01): 2,324
  - Density: 80/km^{2} (210/sq mi)
- Time zone: EET/EEST (UTC+2/+3)
- Postal code: 727220
- Area code: (+40) x30
- Vehicle reg.: SV
- Website: comunadragusenisv.ro

Drăgușeni is a commune located in Suceava County, Romania. It is composed of three villages: Broșteni, Drăgușeni and Gara Leu.

== Natives ==
- Gheorghe Cardaș
