= Dimitrie Gusti National Village Museum =

Museum in Bucharest, Romania

National Village Museum "Dimitrie Gusti"
- Muzeul Național al Satului "Dimitrie Gusti"
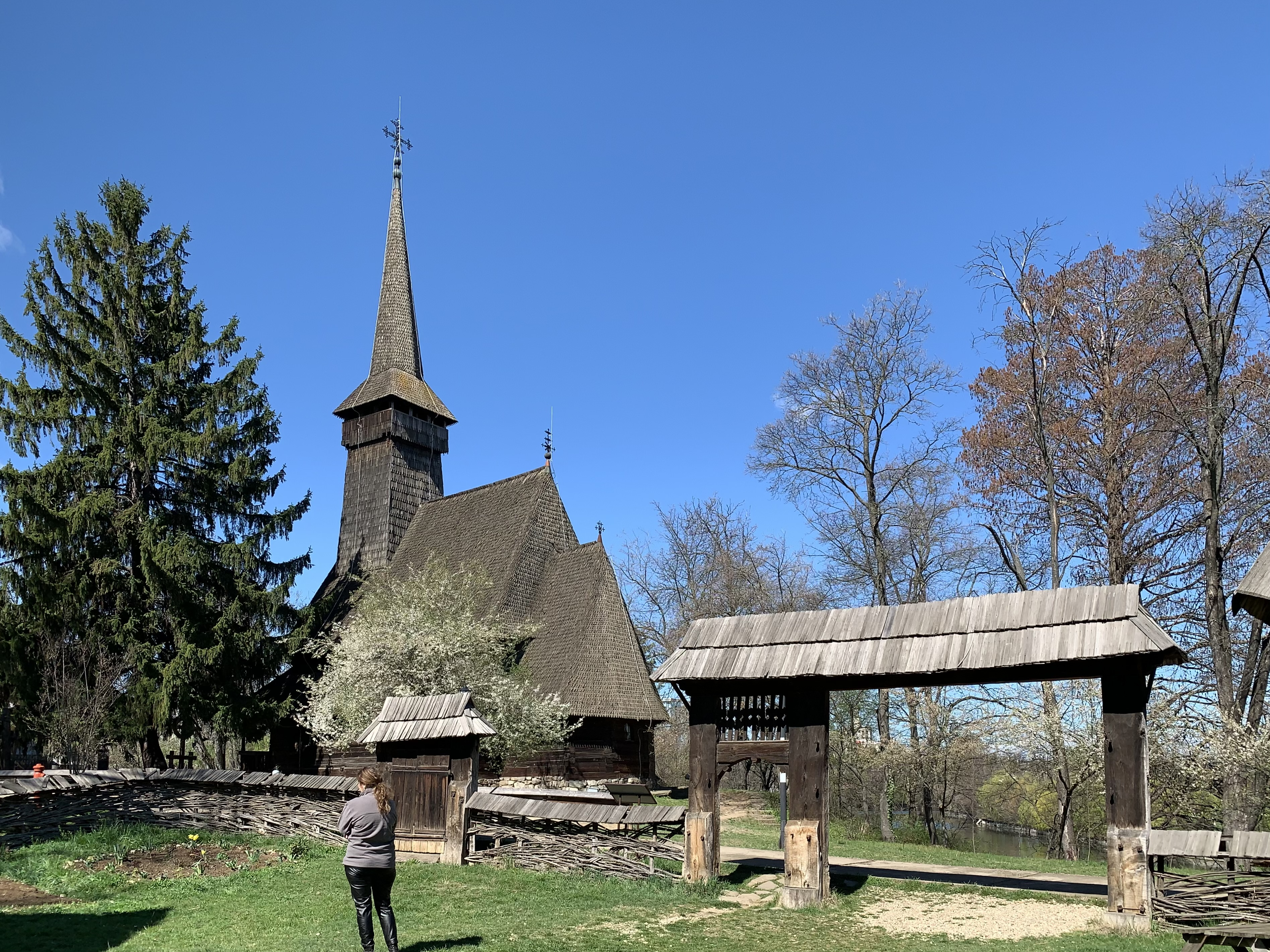
- Maramureș wooden church from Dragomirești, Maramureș County, 17th century
- Established: 1936
- Location: King Michael I Park, Bucharest, Romania
- Coordinates: 44.47336°N 26.07656°E
- Type: open-air ethnographic museum
- Collection size: 123 settlements, 363 monuments, over 50,000 artefacts
- Founder: Dimitrie Gusti
- Website: www.muzeul-satului.ro

The Village Museum or formally National Museum of the Village "Dimitrie Gusti" (Romanian: Muzeul Național al Satului "Dimitrie Gusti") is an open-air ethnographic museum located in the King Michael I Park, Bucharest, Romania. The museum showcases traditional Romanian village life. The museum extends to over 100,000 m^{2}, and contains 123 authentic peasant settlements, 363 monuments and over 50,000 artefacts from around Romania. Structures in the museum ranged from the 17th to the 20th century, representative of different ethnographic regions including Banat, Transylvania, Moldavia, Maramures, Oltenia, Dobrogea, Muntenia.

The village was a creation of the folklorist and sociologist Dimitrie Gusti. The location plans were executed by the writer, playwright, director Victor Ion Popa and set designer Henri H. Stahl. The necessary financial funds were provided by the Royal Cultural Foundation and in the presence of King Carol II of Romania the museum was inaugurated on 10 May 1936. At the time of its inauguration, it was the fourth open-air museum of Europe after Skansen (Stockholm, Sweden), Norsk Folkemuseum at Bygdøy (Oslo, Norway), and the Ethnographic Museum of Transylvania at Hoia Forest in Cluj-Napoca. The museum initially was 4.5 ha in size with 33 authentic settlements that were transferred from the researched villages. Among them was the Maramures wooden church from Dragomirești, Maramures county. The building remains the central piece and is incorporated into the logo of the museum.

== Gallery ==
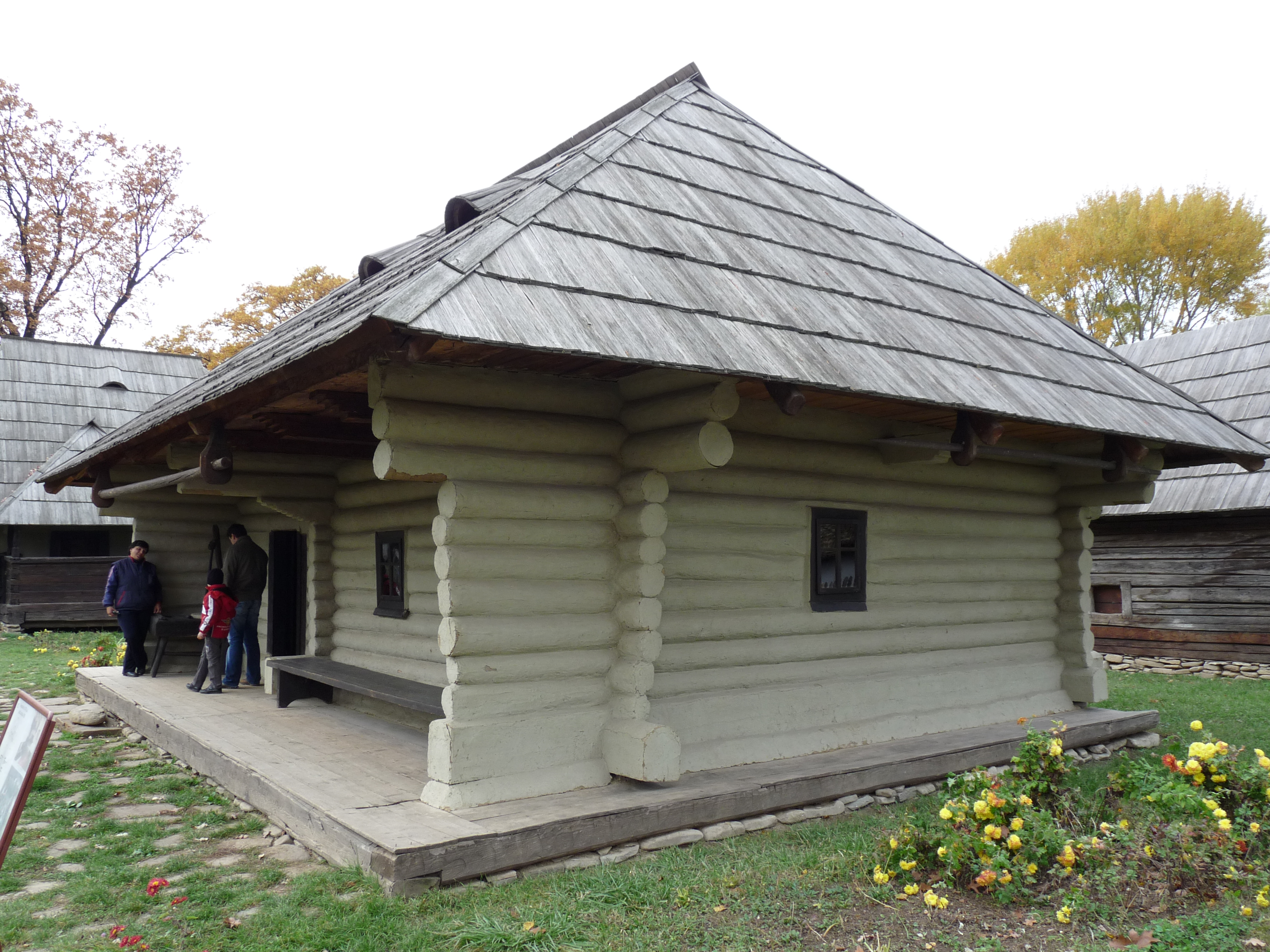
18th century Suceava County house

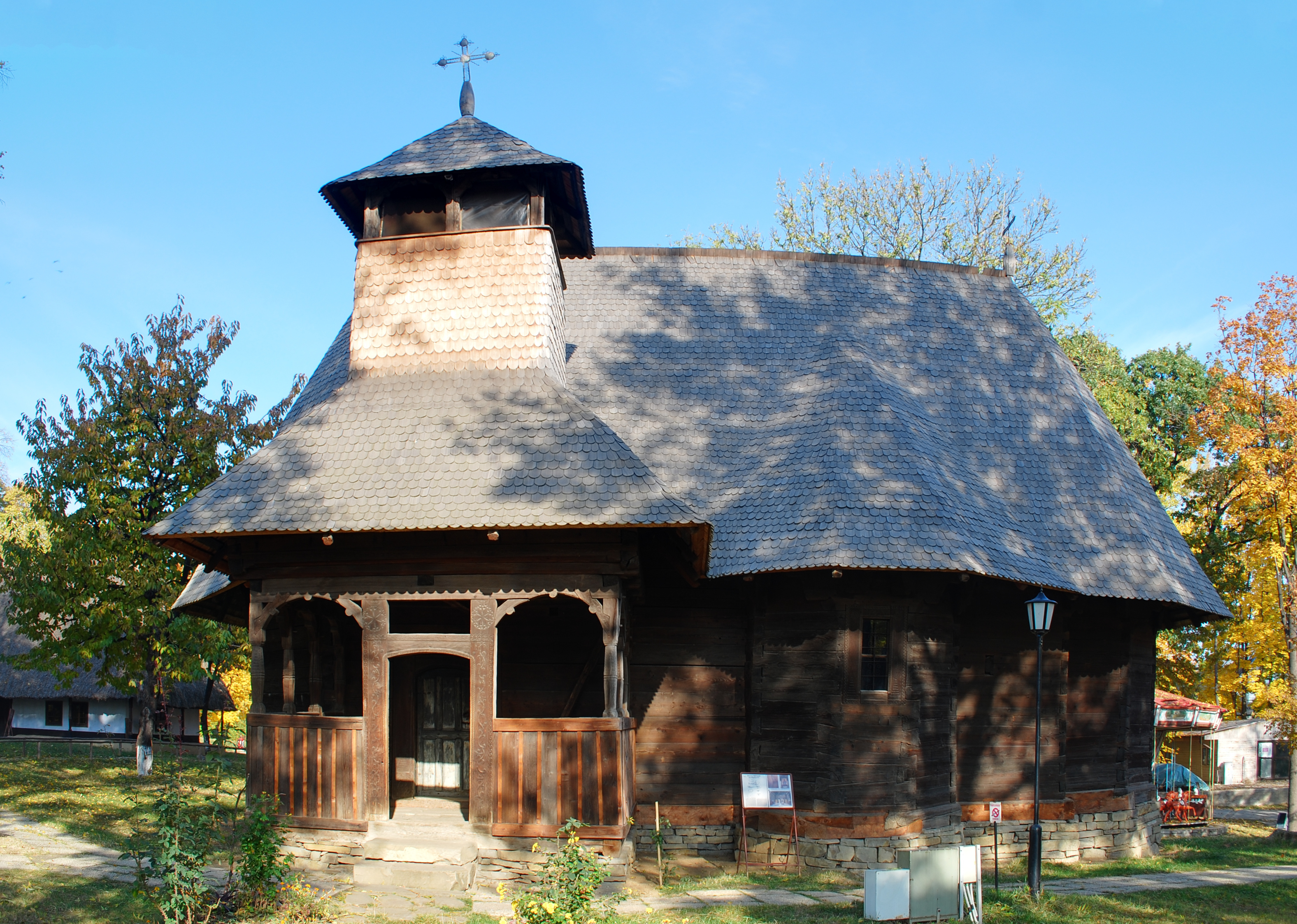
18th century Neamț County church

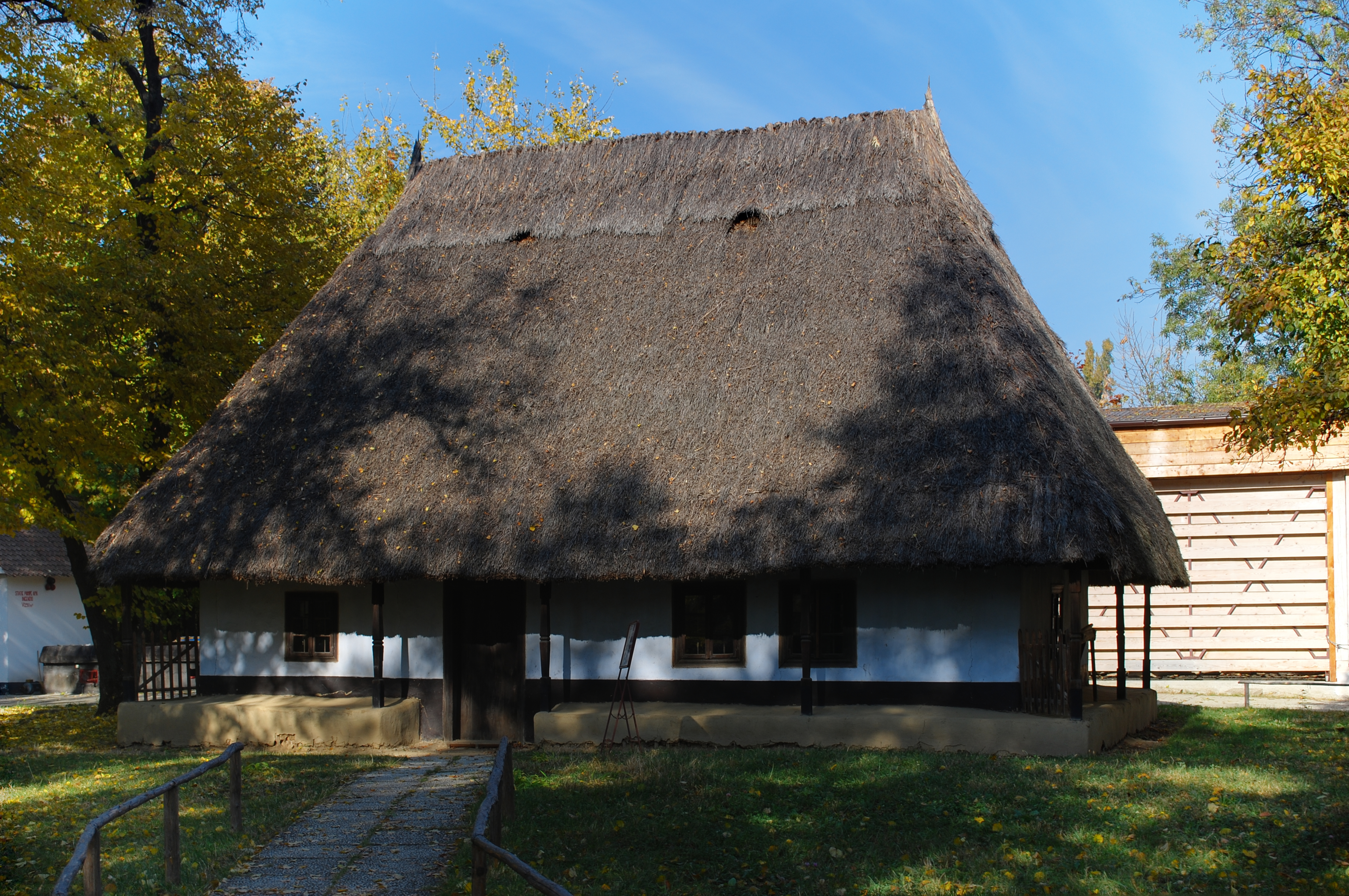
19th century Suceava County house

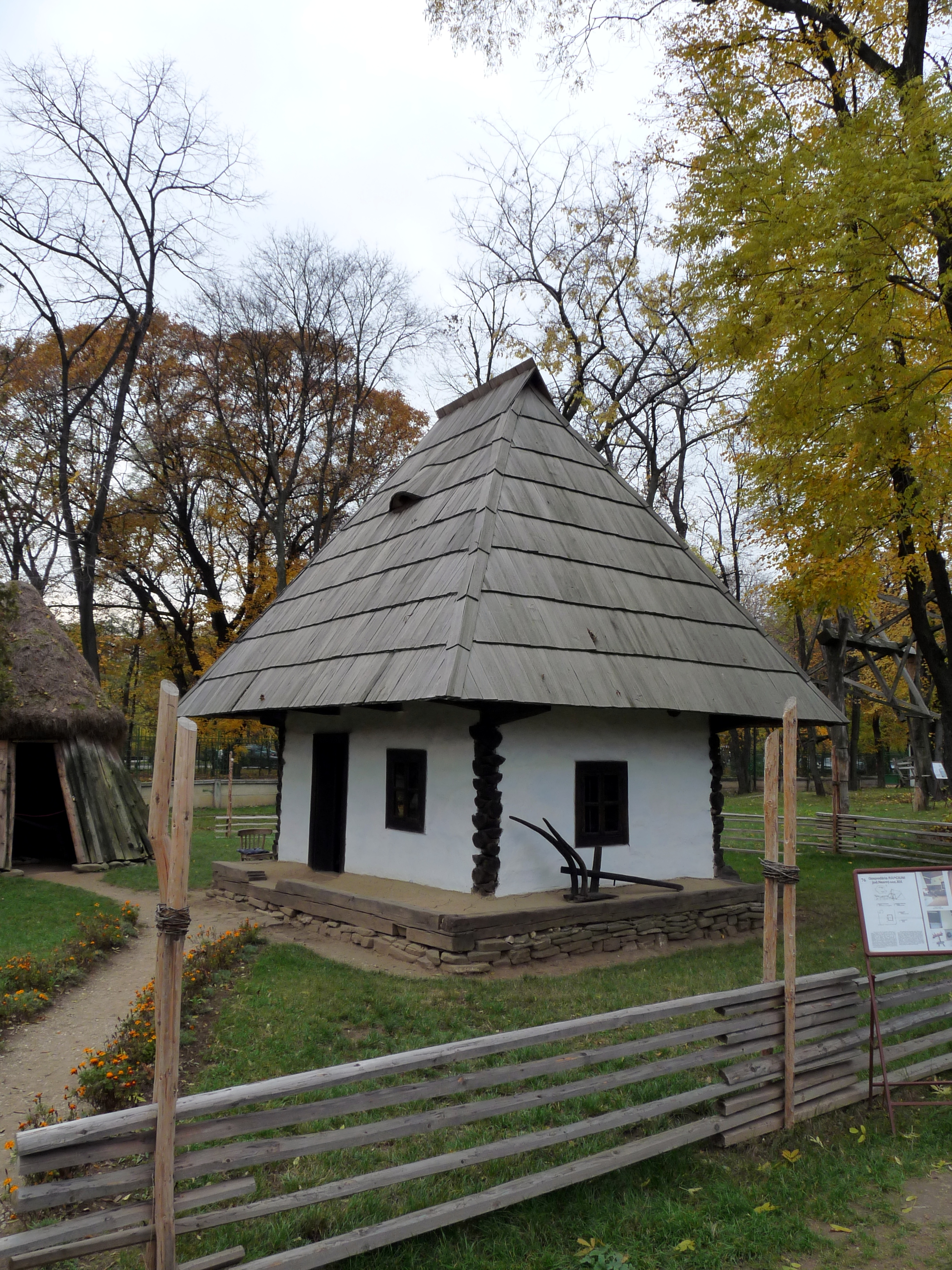
19th century Neamț County house

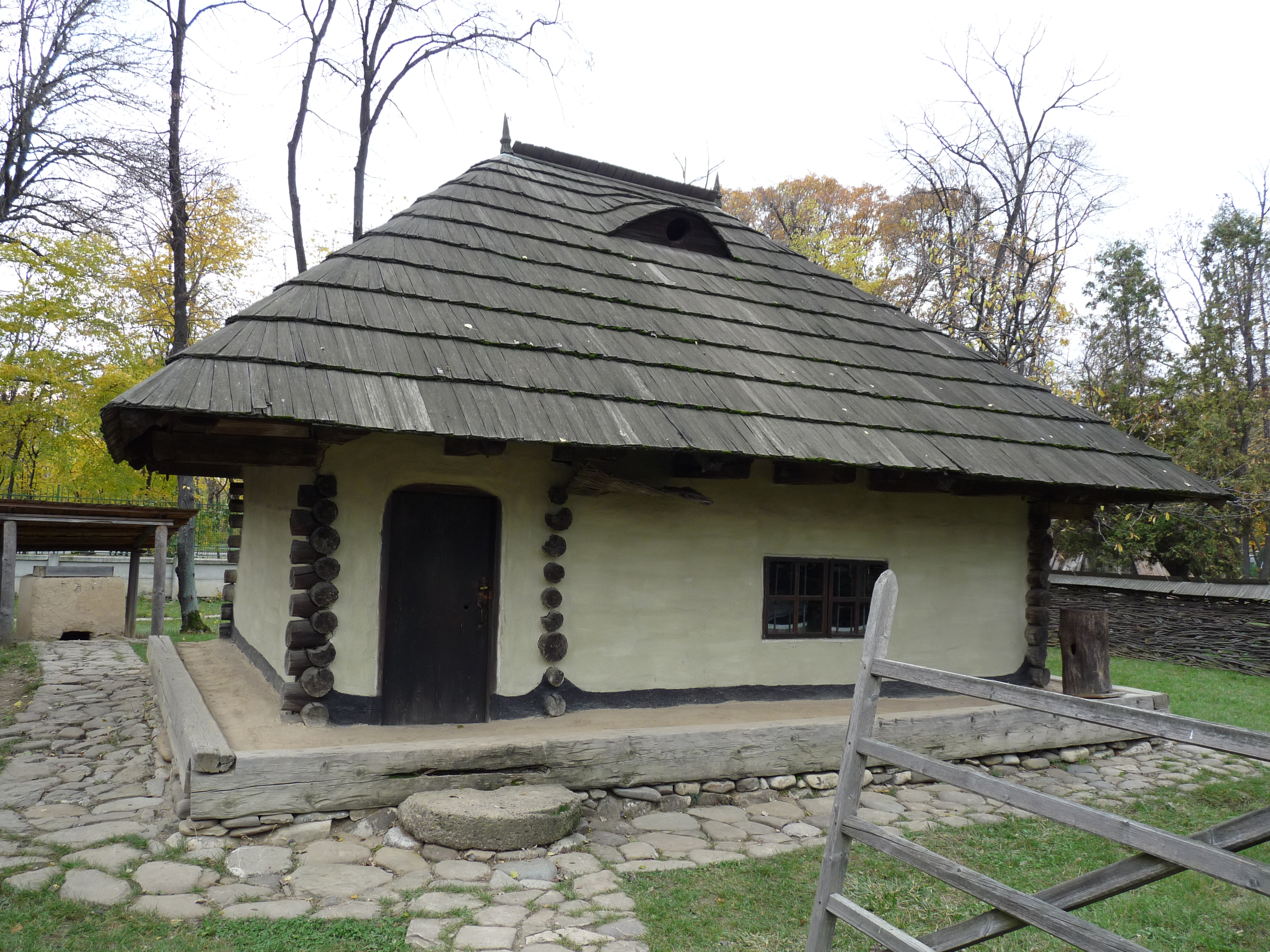
19th century Neamț County house

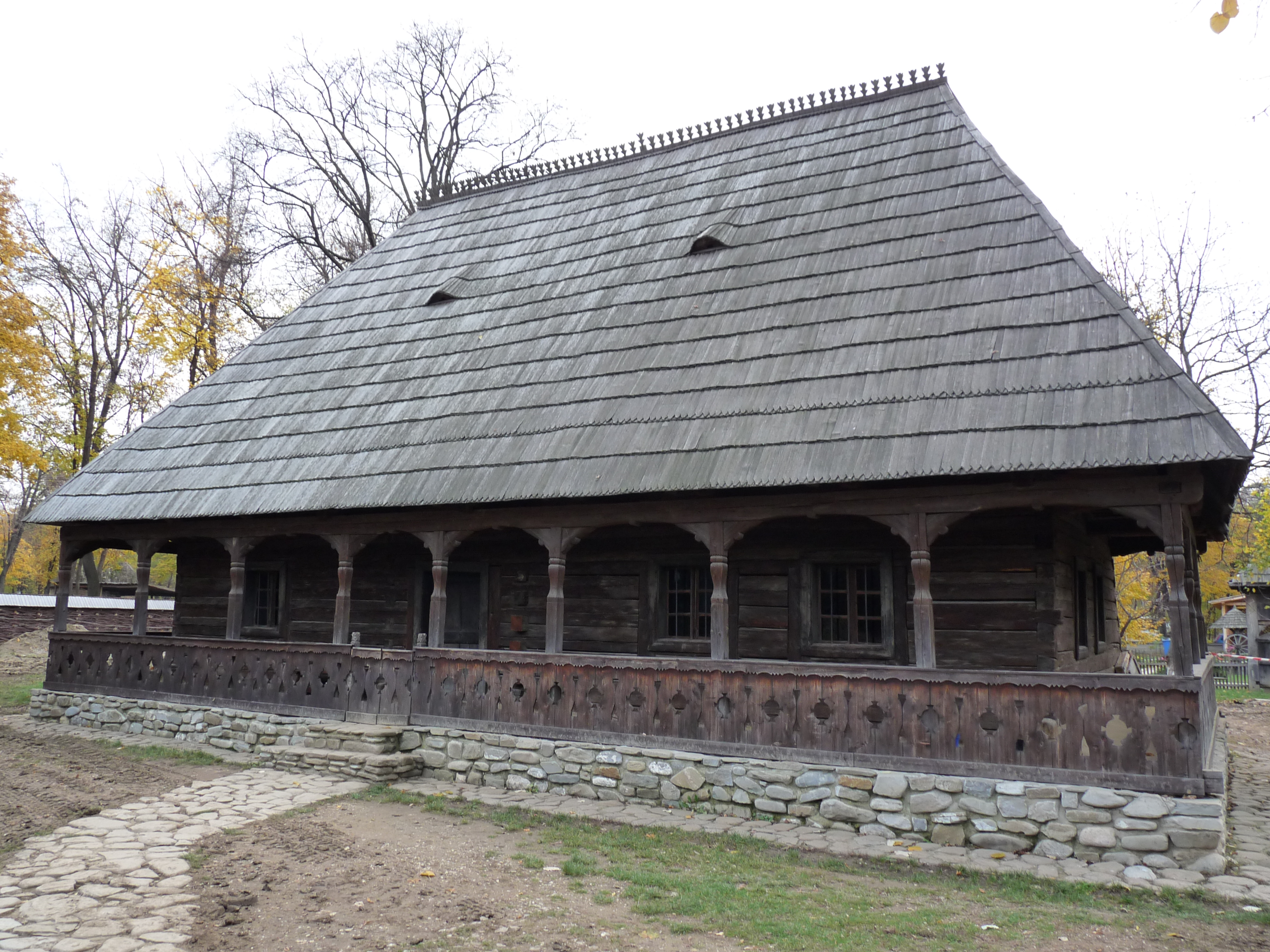
19th century Maramureș house

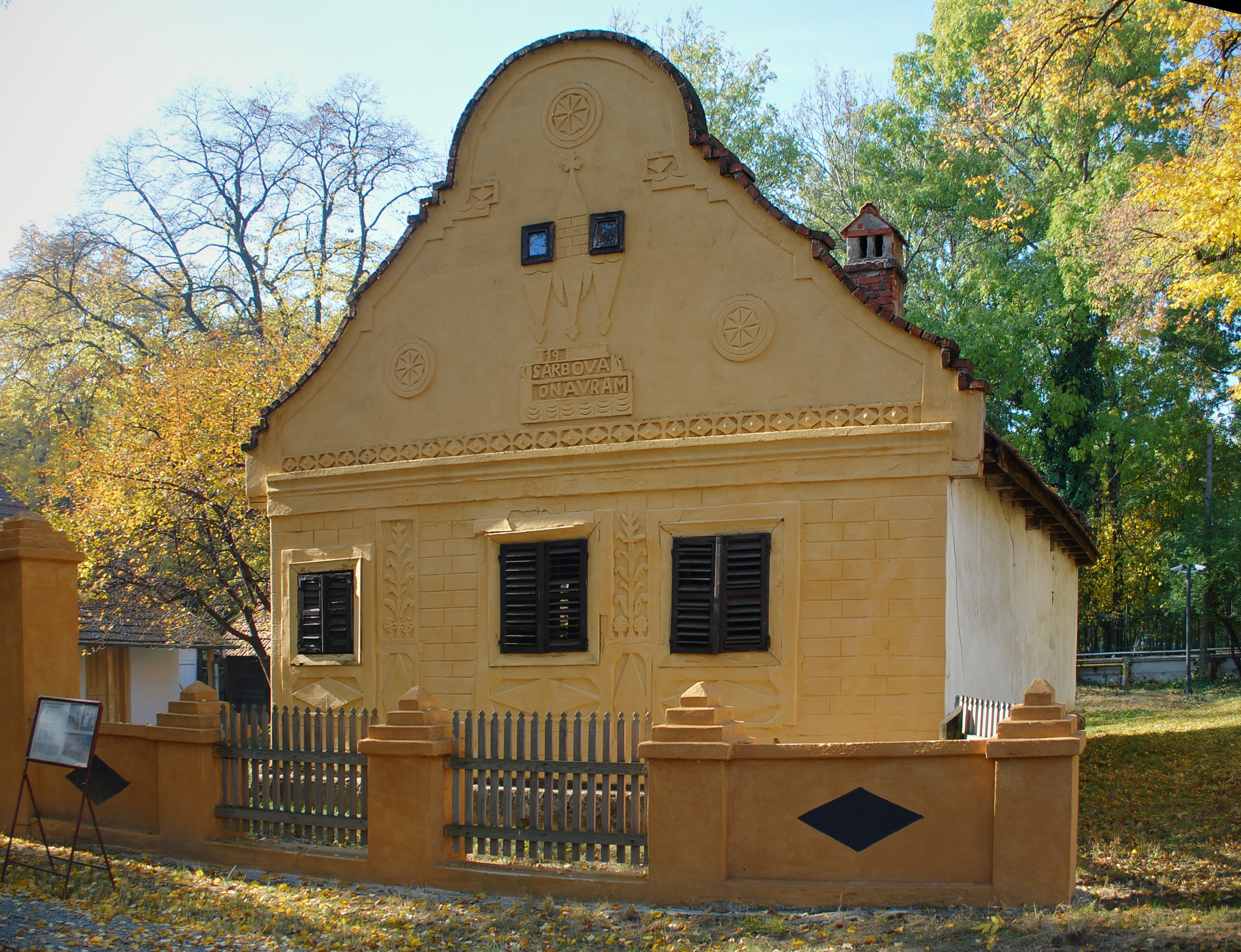
19th century Timiș County house

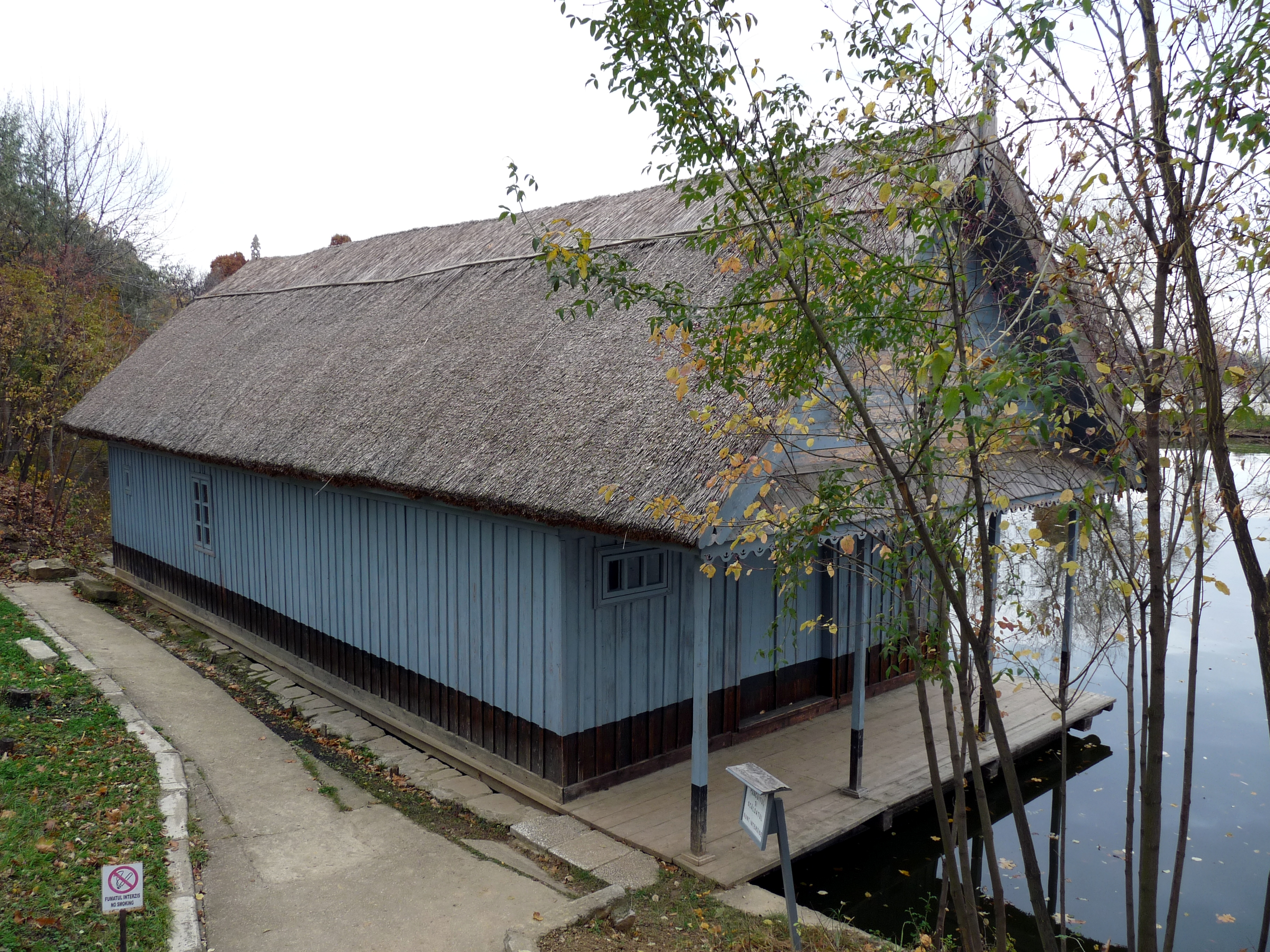
Tulcea County fishery

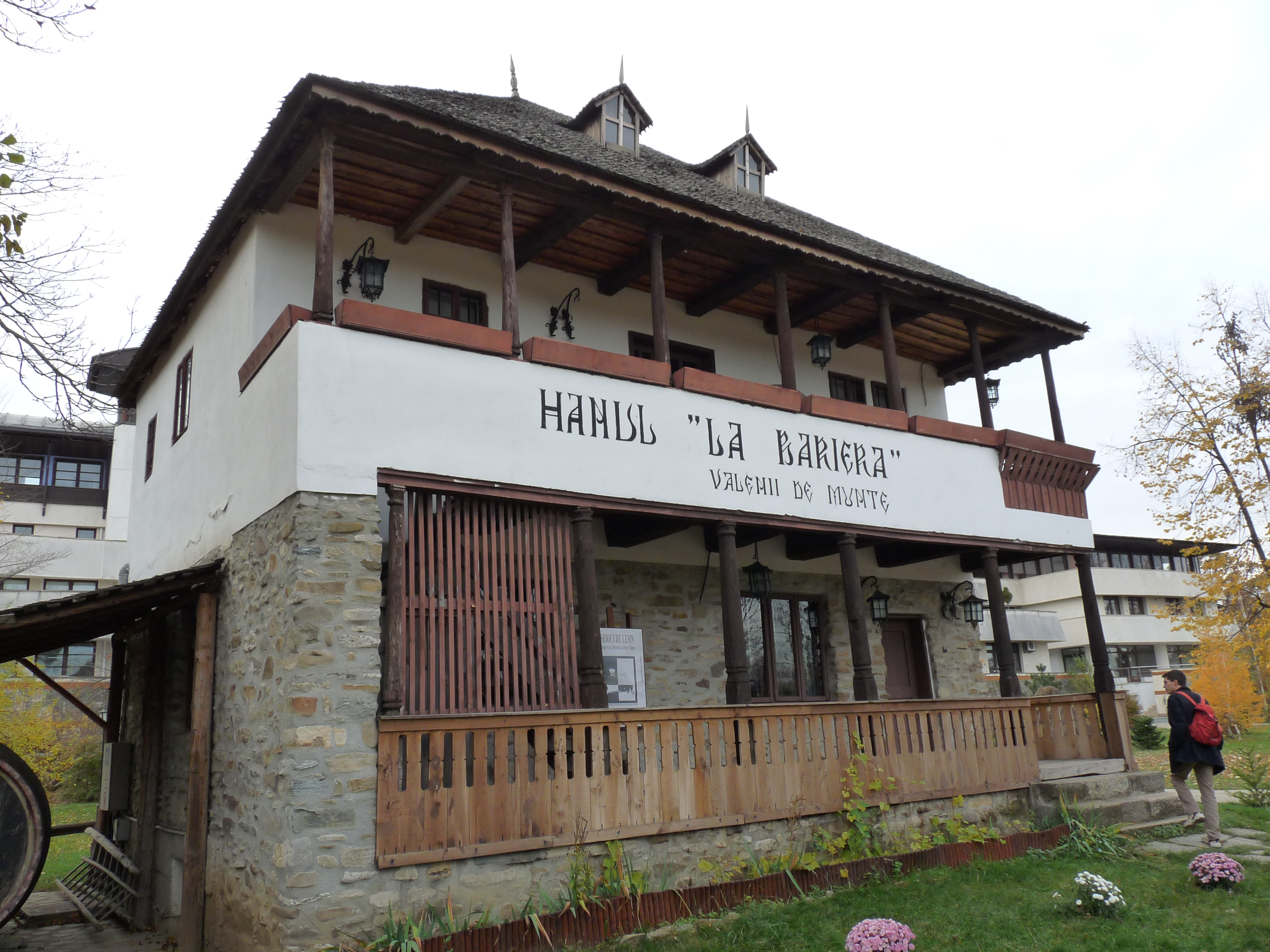
Inn

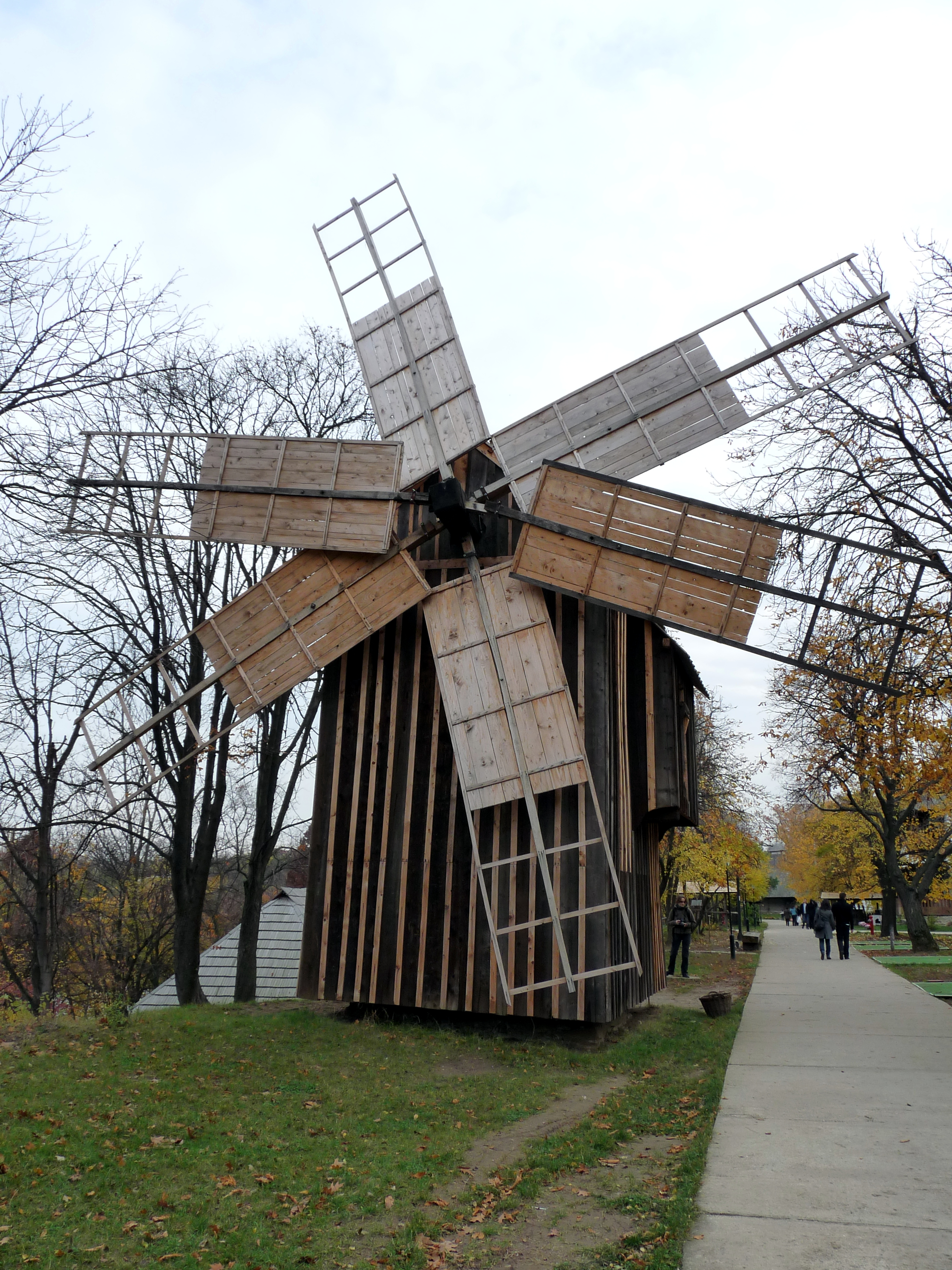
Mill

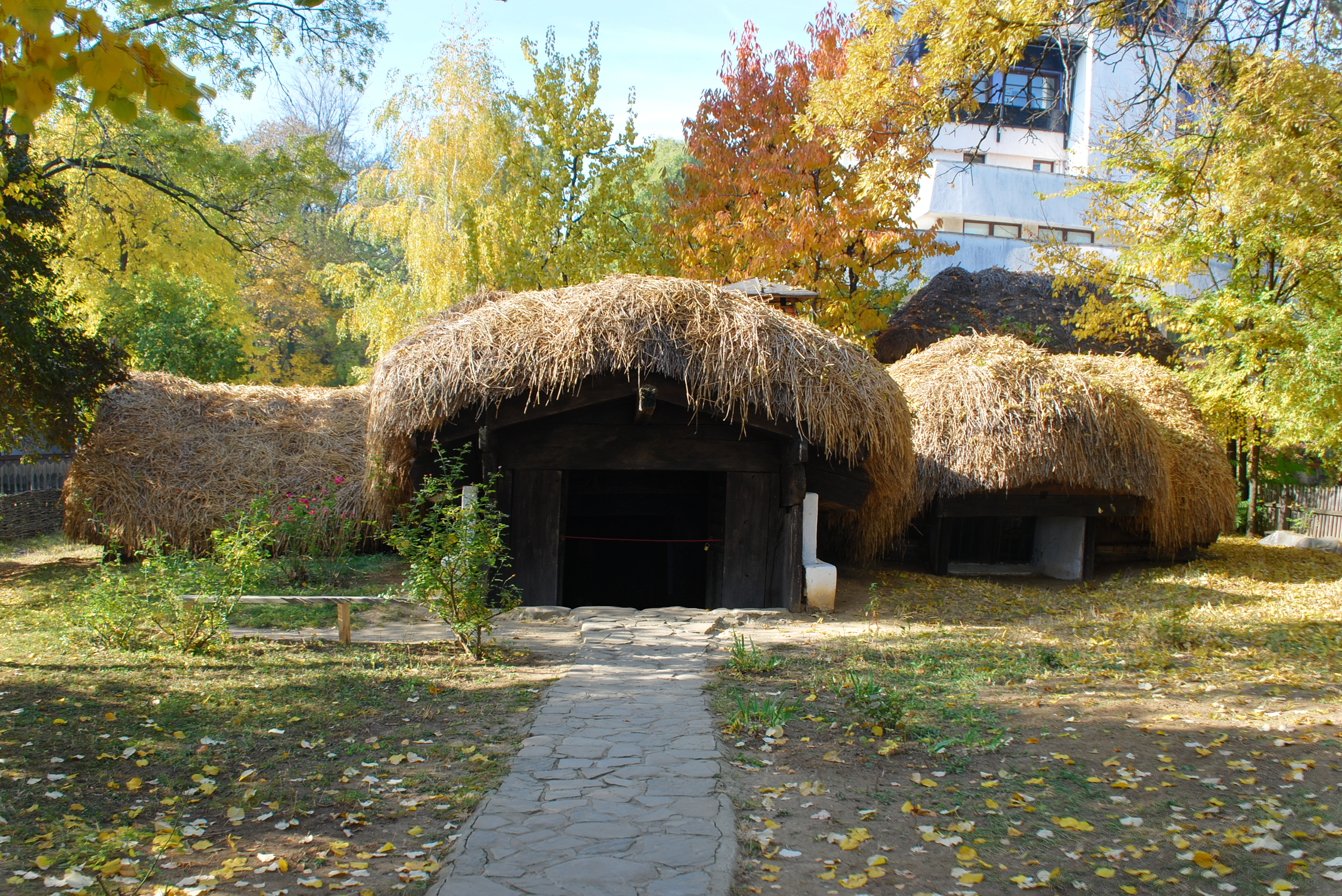
19th century Olt County mud hut

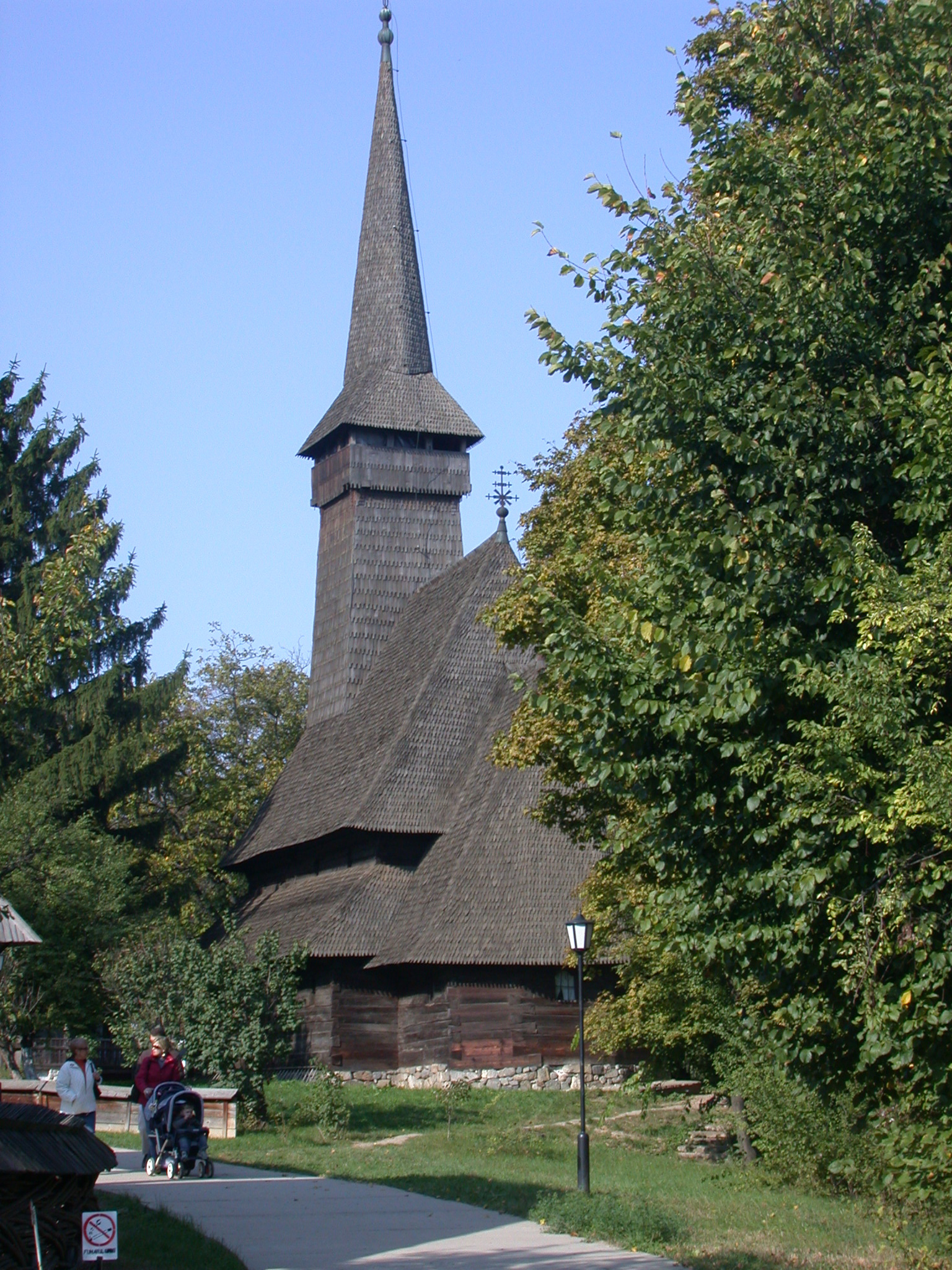
18th century Maramureș church

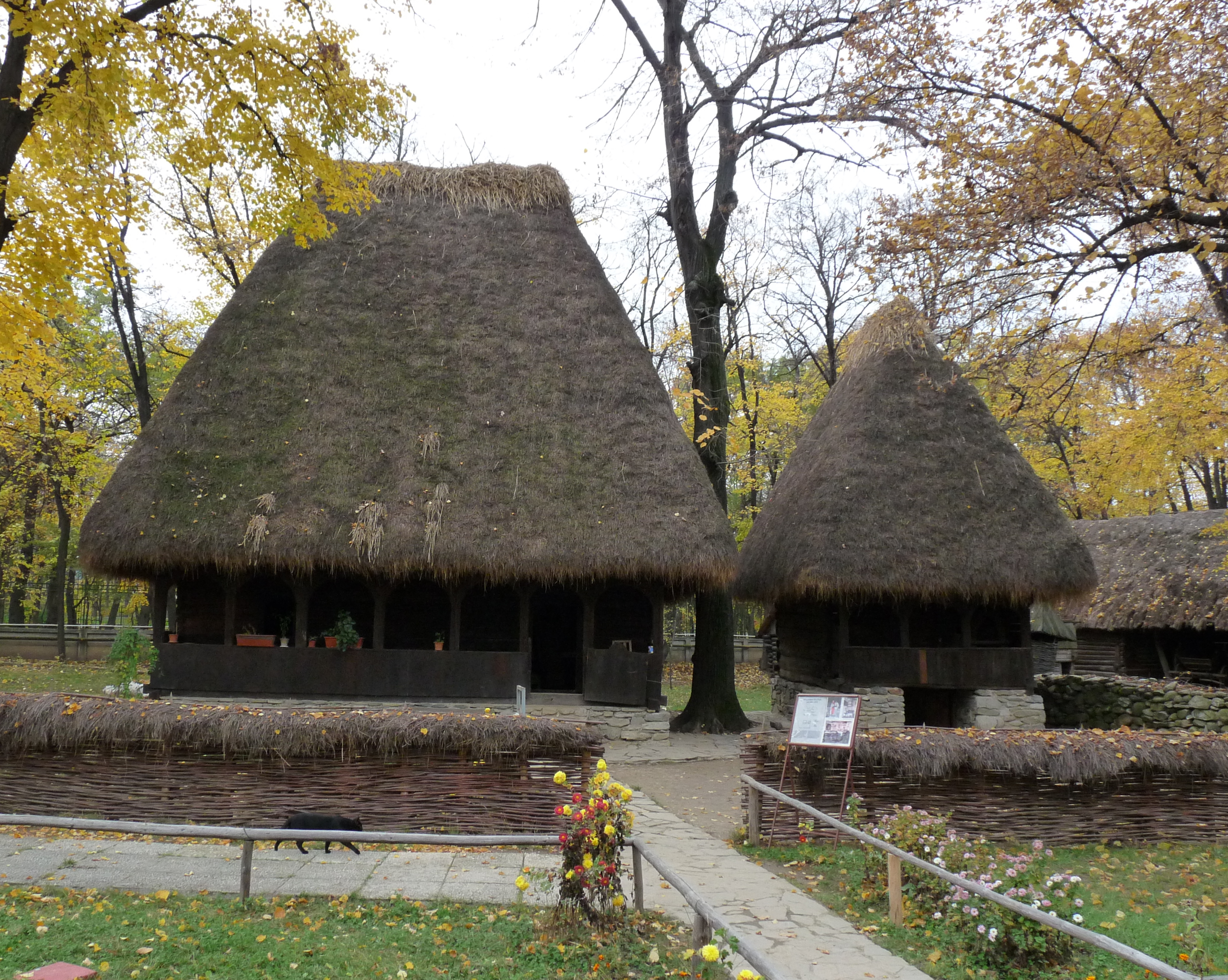
19th century Alba County house

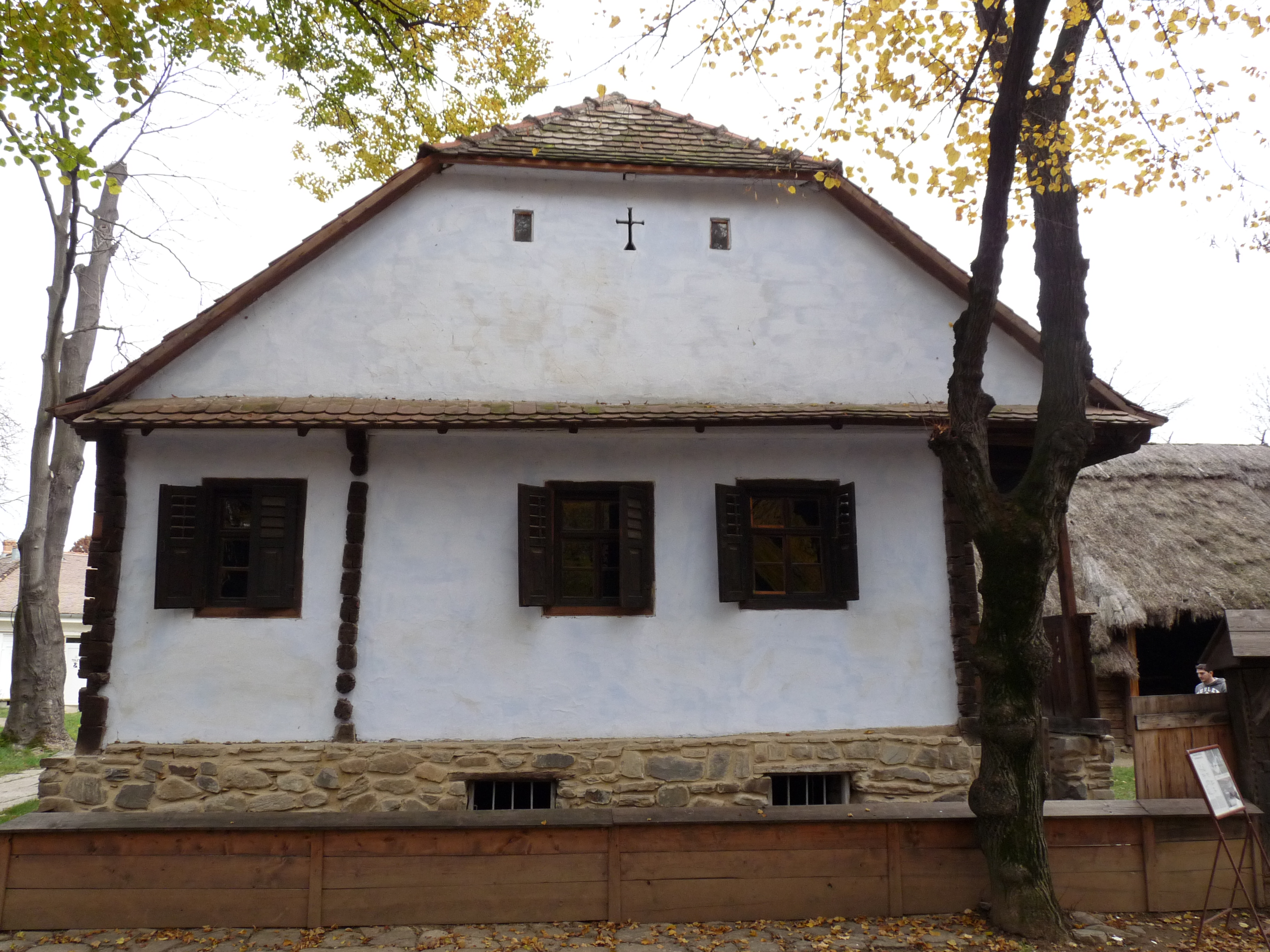
19th century Brașov County house

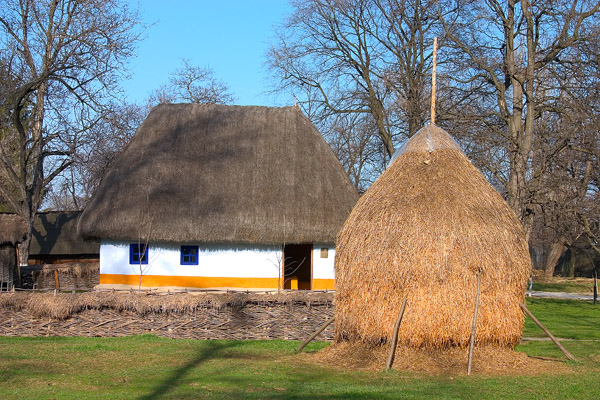
19th century Alba County house

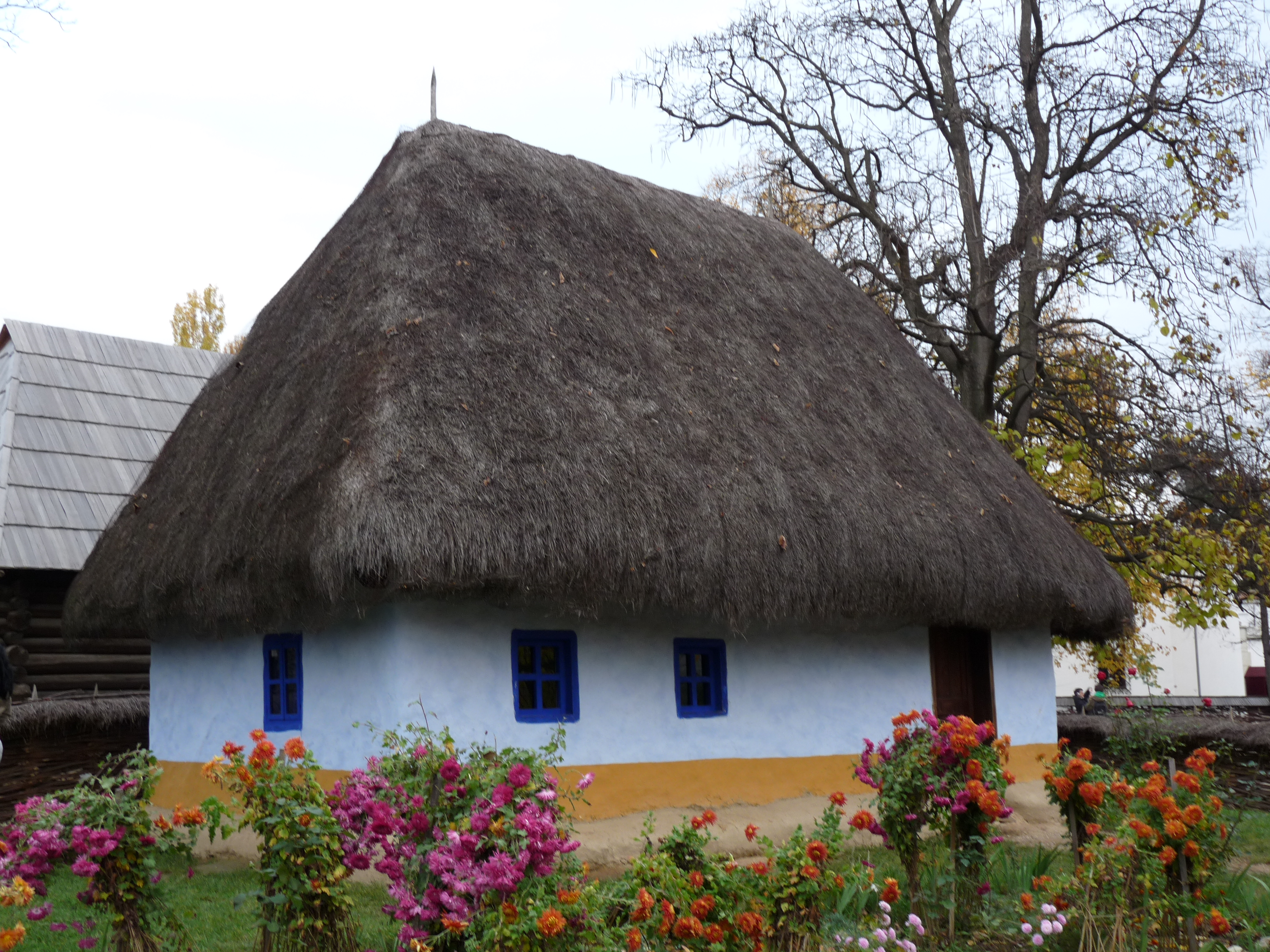
19th century Alba County house

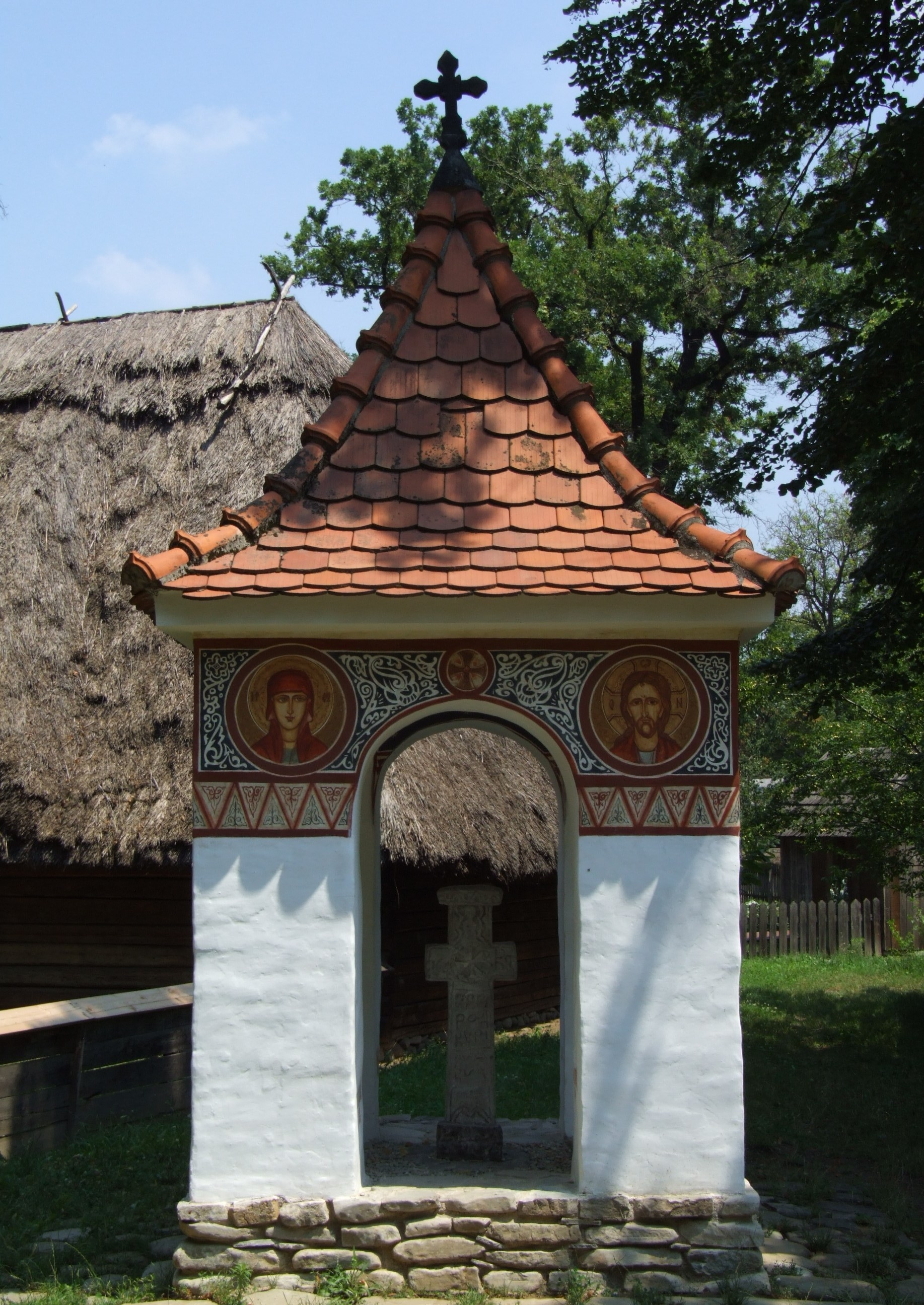
Shrine

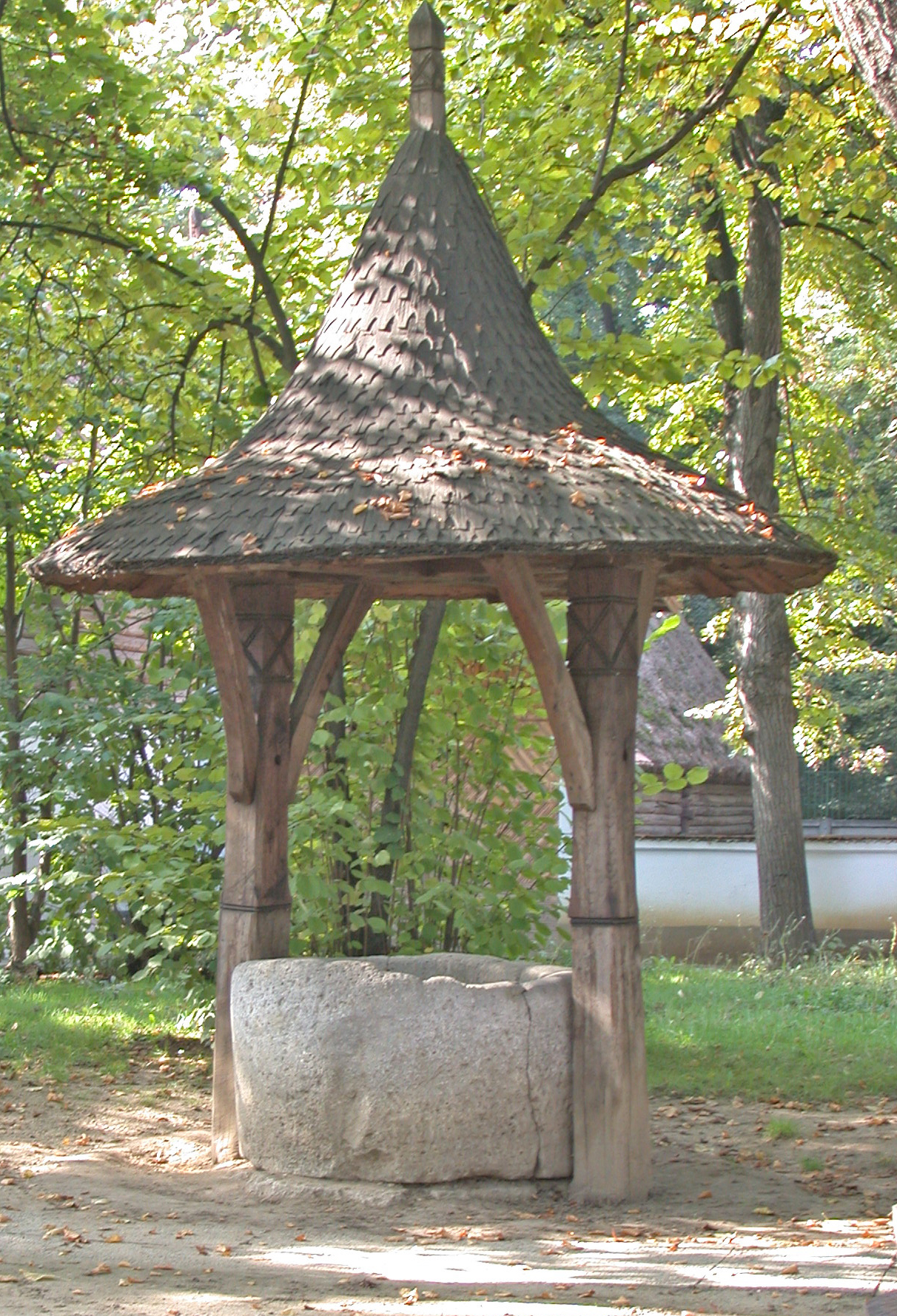
Well

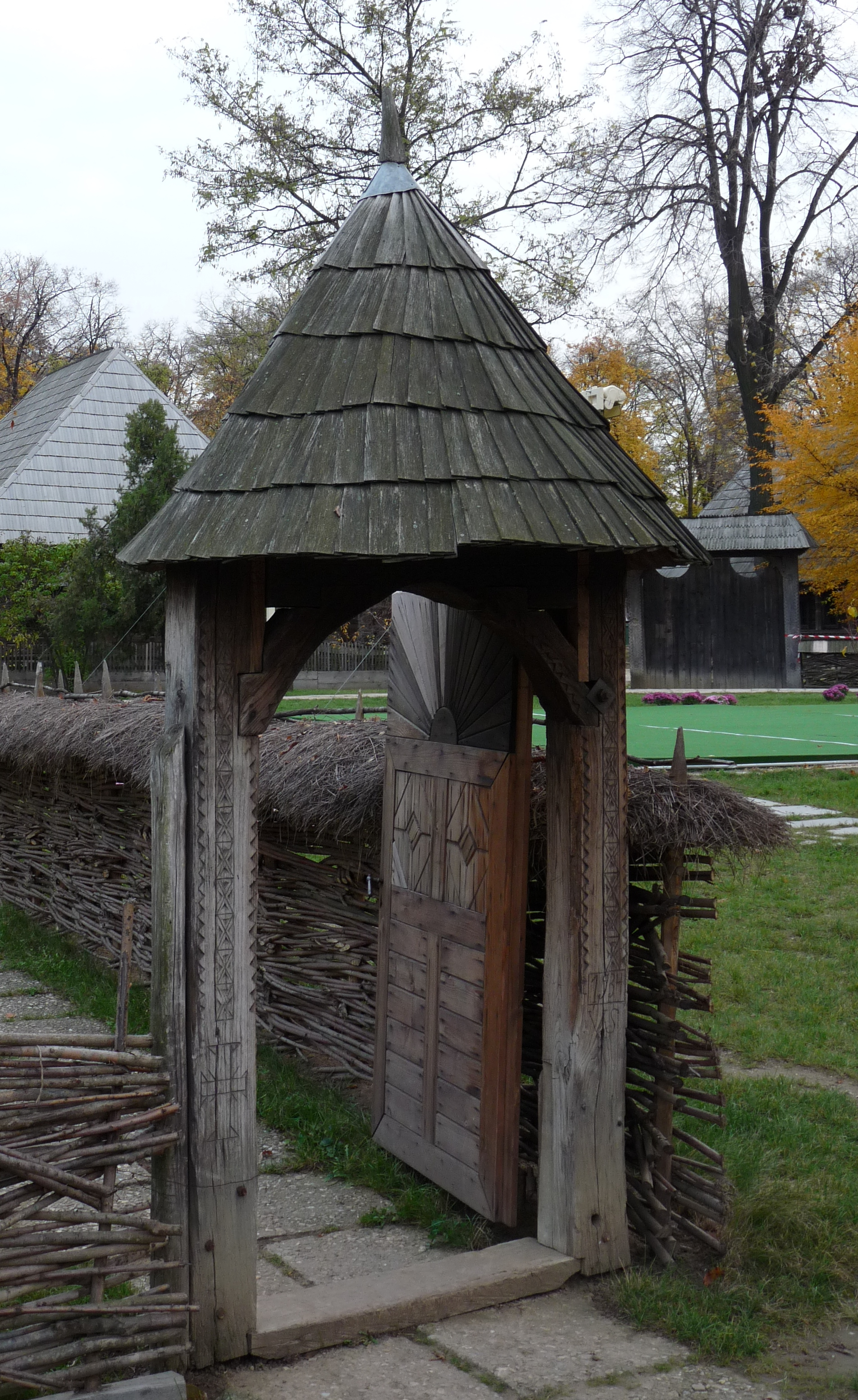
Gate

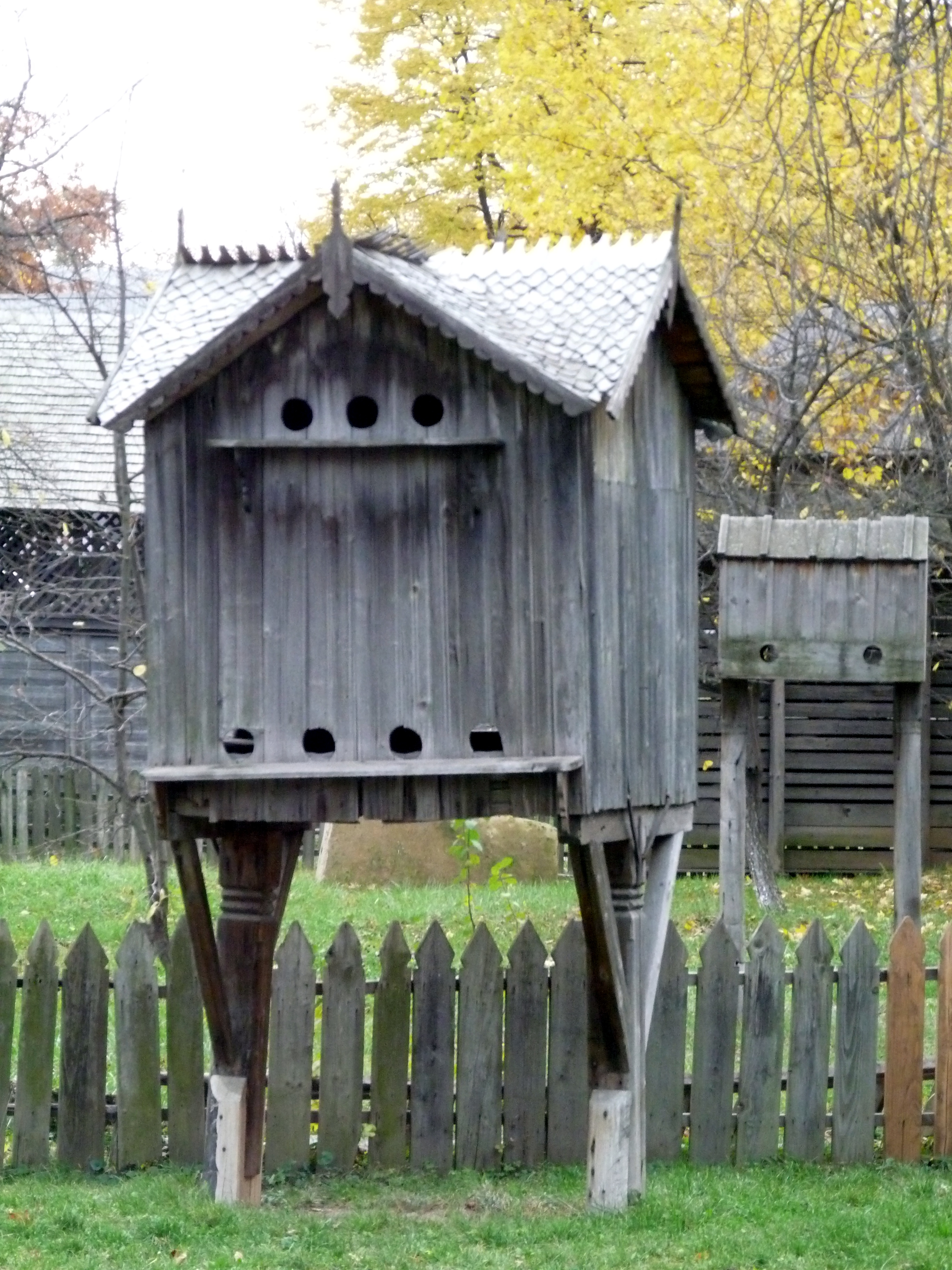
Pigeonry

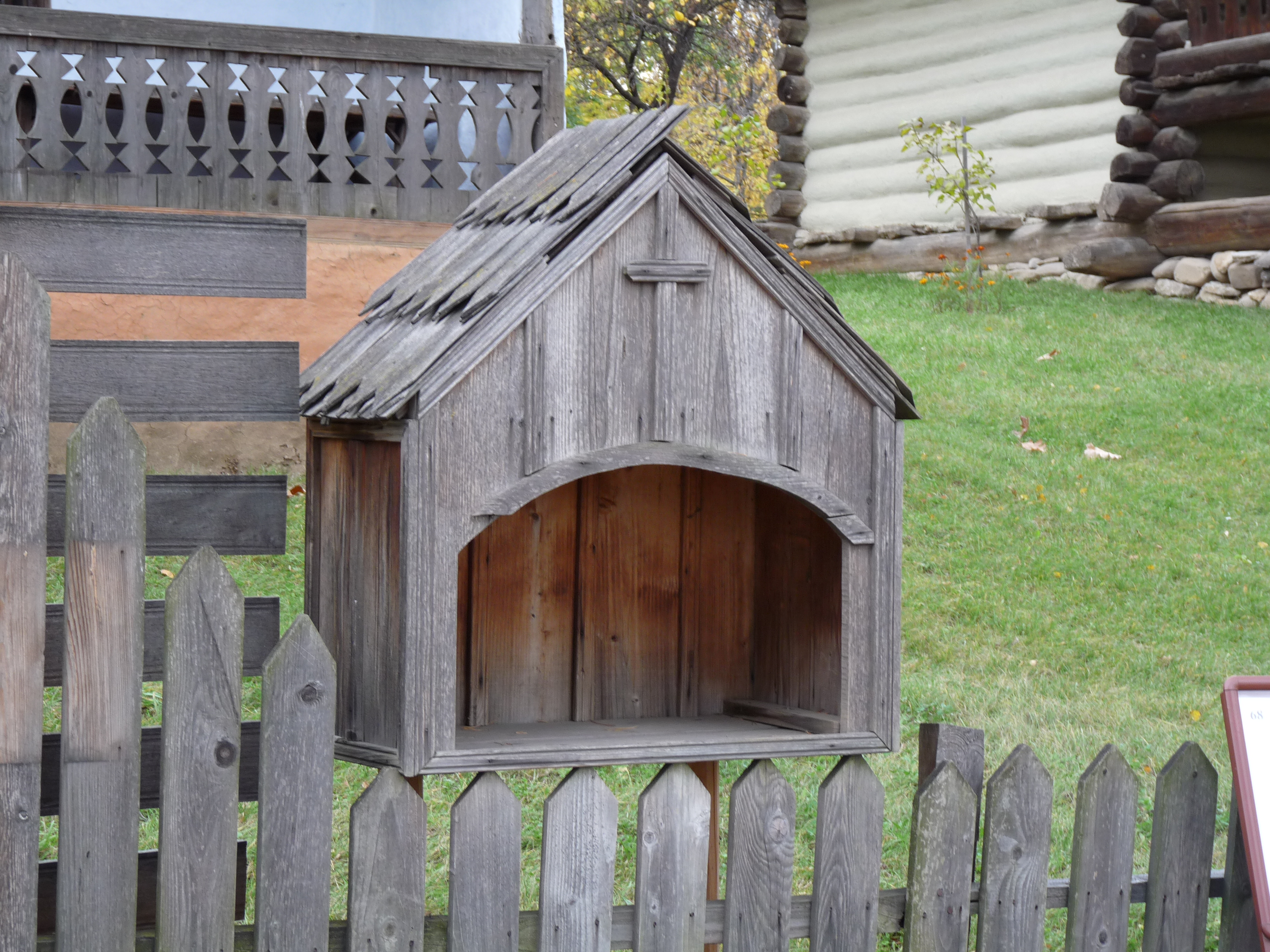
Food box

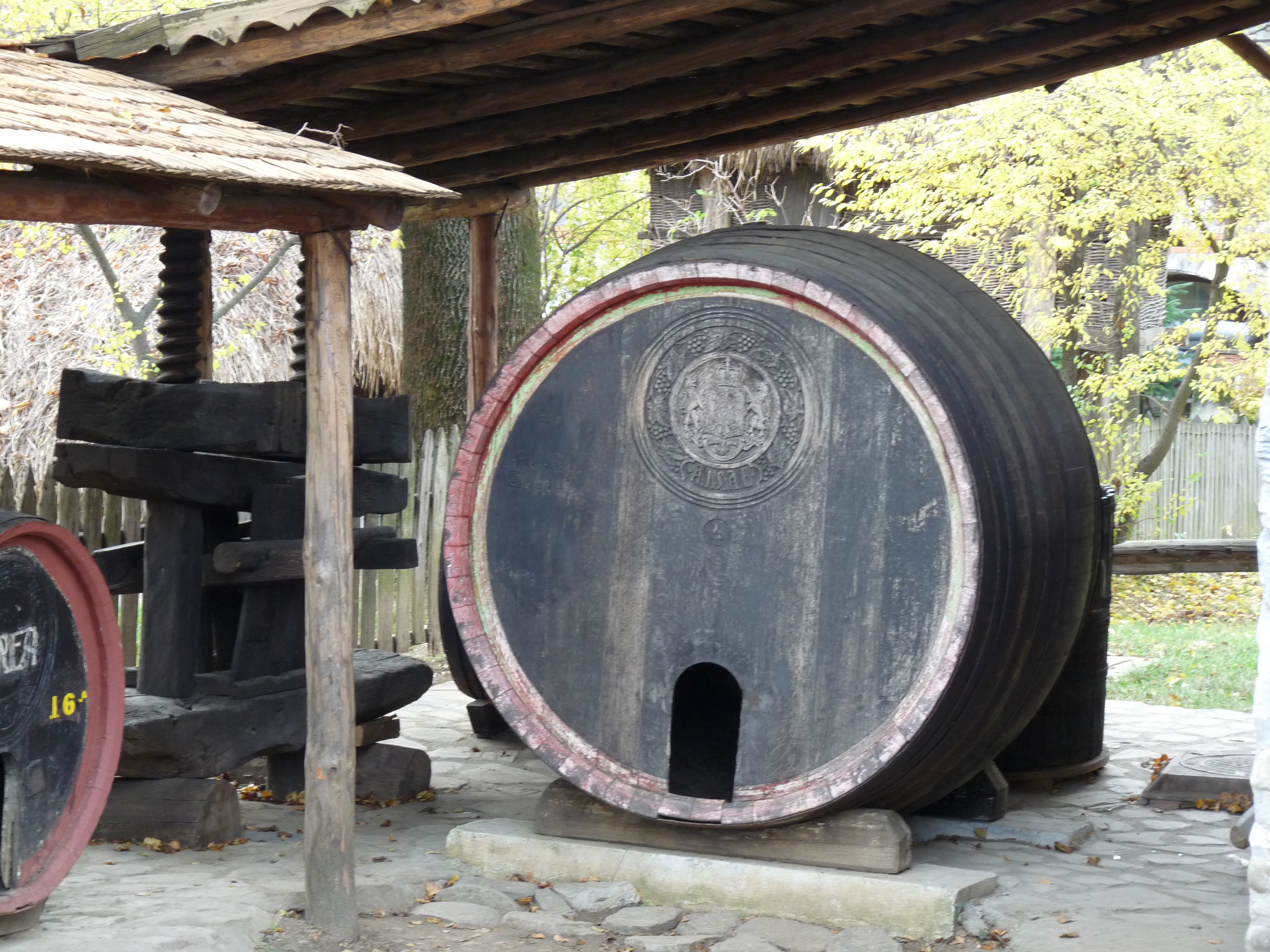
Wine barrel

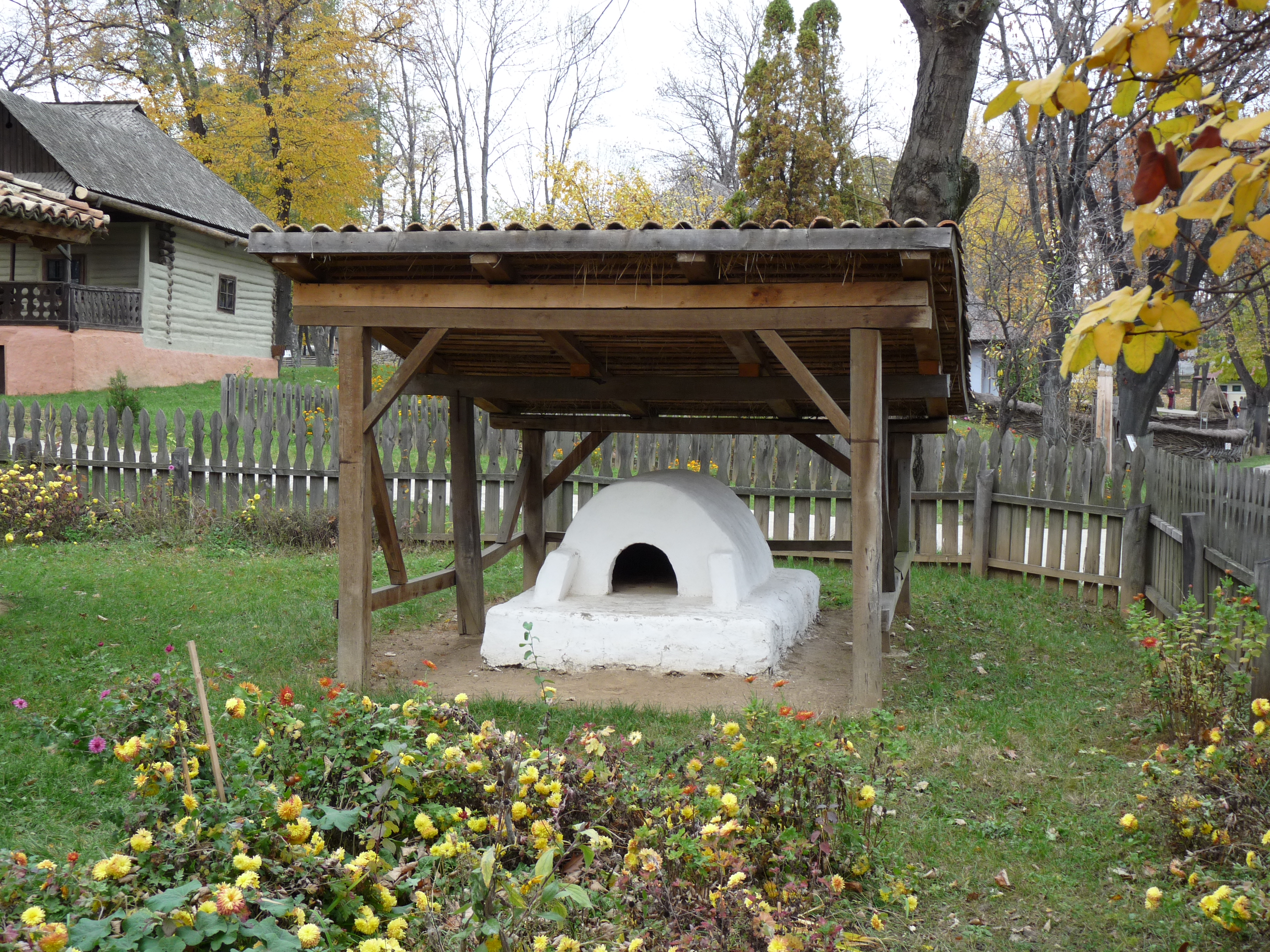
Oven

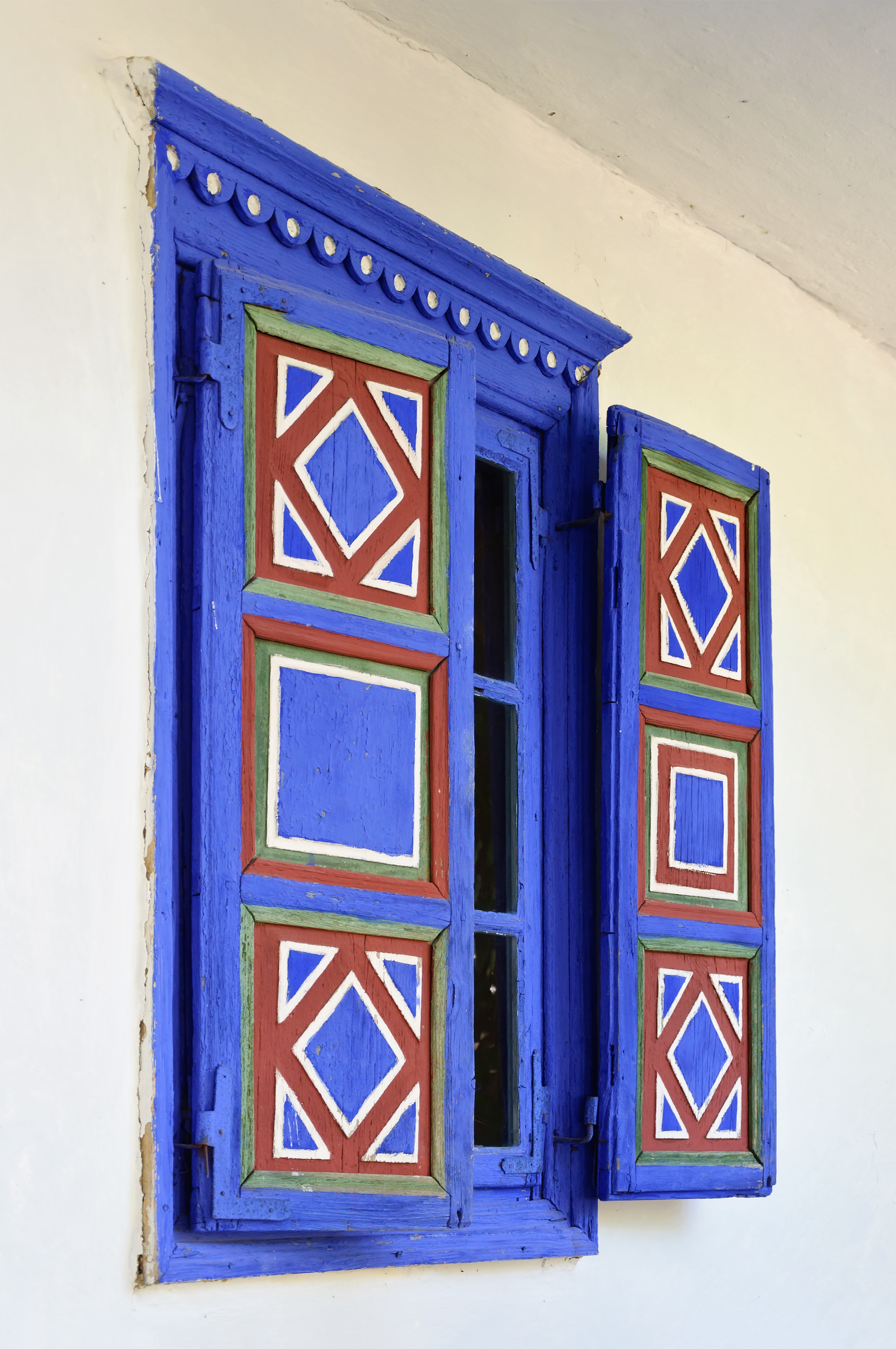
Window

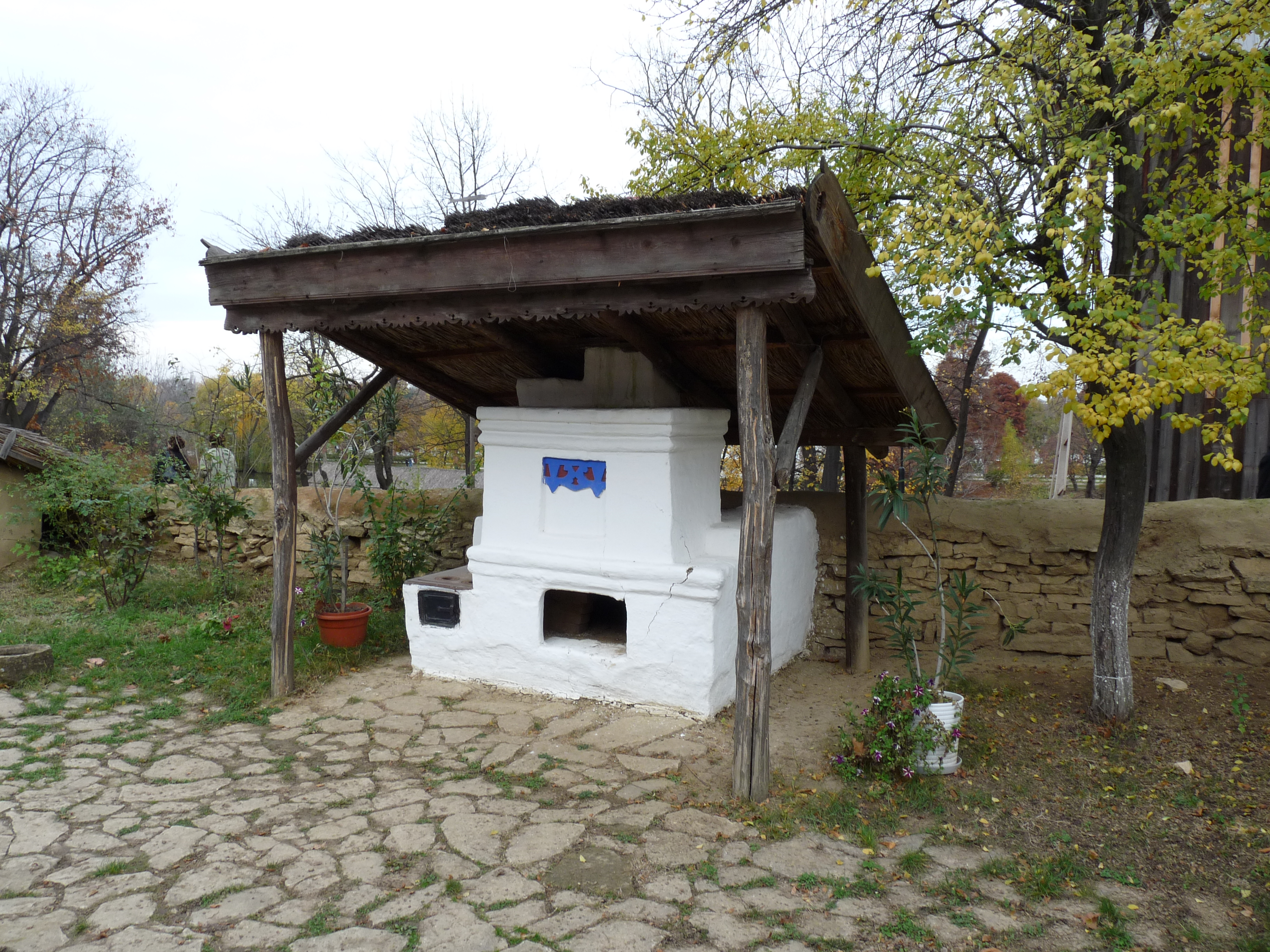
Summer kitchen

== See also ==
- Open-air museum
