= George Mihail Zamfirescu =

Romanian prose writer and playwright (1898–1939)

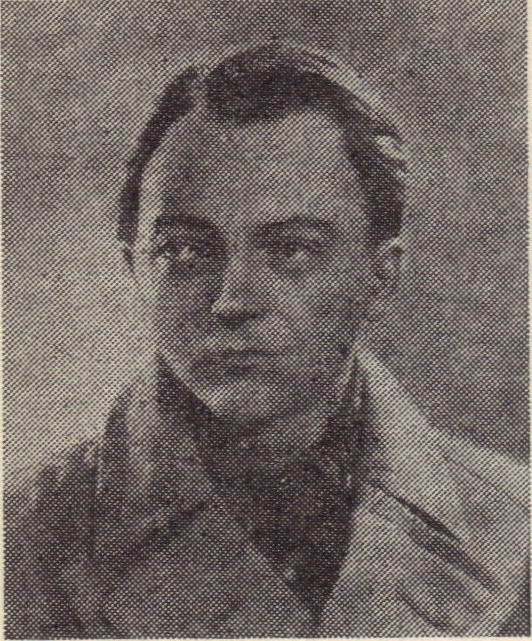
- Born: 13 October 1898; Bucharest, Kingdom of Romania
- Died: 8 August 1939 (aged 40); Bucharest, Kingdom of Romania
- Education: Cantemir Vodă National College
- Occupations: Playwright, critic, editor, civil servant
- Writing career
- Language: Romanian
- Genre: Poetry

George Mihail Zamfirescu (born Gheorghe Petre Mihai; 13 October 1898 – 8 August 1939) was a Romanian prose writer and playwright.

He was born in Bucharest, the son of Petre Mihai, a drayman, and his wife Lina (Raluca) Costache. Between 1905 and 1916, he attended primary school and six grades at Cantemir High School. From 1917 to 1918, he went to a Botoșani school for training reserve officers, and saw action in World War I in 1918. That year, he made his literary debut with the poem "Versurile mele" in Literatorul, and became a frequent participant in Alexandru Macedonski's circle. In 1920, he founded the Association of young Romanian writers and Eroii patriei magazine.

From 1922 to 1924, he was a civil servant handling social insurance in Satu Mare, in the recently acquired Transylvania province. While there, he founded the Society for Romanian theatre and culture, and published his first volume, the 1924 Flamura albă. Back in Bucharest, he obtained a post as librarian at the Libertatea Circle. A period of intense journalistic activity followed, including the drama column in Vremea review. In 1929, he was a director at the national theatre in Cernăuți. At Bucharest, he founded the dramatic companies Masca (1931) and 13+1 (1932), seeking to create a revolution in the theatrical milieu.

As a director at the Iași National Theatre from 1933 to 1939, he staged twenty-five plays. He was an editor at Facla (1932), Adevărul and Dimineața (1937-1938). He authored the prose volumes Gazda cu ochii umezi (1926) and Miss (1942), the novel Madona cu trandafiri (1931) and the epic cycle Bariera (Maidanul cu dragoste, 1933; Sfânta mare nerușinare, 1936; Cântecul destinelor, 1939). His plays include Cuminecătura (1925), Domnișoara Nastasia (1927), Sam (1929), Adonis (1930) and Idolul și Ion Anapoda (1935). His 1938 book Mărturii în contemporaneitate, which contains articles about the theatre, reflects the concerns of a prominent figure of the interwar Romanian stage. His last play, Cântecul vieții ('Life's song'), whose manuscript is dated January 1938 - July 1939, remained unfinished due to his illness and untimely death.

His daughter was the actress Raluca Zamfirescu.
