= Dimitrie Gusti =

Romanian sociologist, ethnologist, historian, and voluntarist philosopher

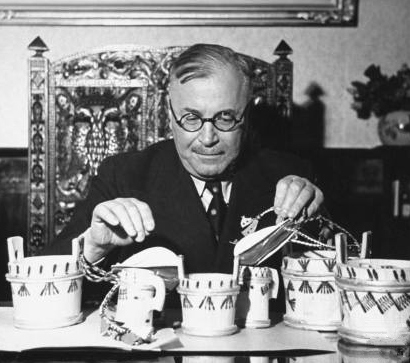
- Gusti in 1938
- Born: 13 February 1880; Iași, Kingdom of Romania
- Died: 30 October 1955 (aged 75); Bucharest, Romanian People's Republic
- Resting place: Eternitatea Cemetery, Iași
- Occupation: Academic
- Known for: Dimitrie Gusti National Village Museum

Academic background
- Education: University of Iași; Humboldt University of Berlin; University of Leipzig

Academic work
- Discipline: Sociology
- Institutions: University of Iași; University of Bucharest
- Doctoral students: Petre Andrei; Lucia Apolzan
- Notable students: Mircea Vulcănescu; Miron Constantinescu; Henri H. Stahl; Lena Constante

Minister of Public Instruction, Religious Affairs and the Arts
- In office 9 June 1932 – 13 November 1933
- Prime Minister: Alexandru Vaida-Voevod; Iuliu Maniu
- Preceded by: Ion Lugoșianu
- Succeeded by: Constantin Angelescu

Dimitrie Gusti (Romanian pronunciation: [diˈmitri.e ˈɡusti]; 13 February 1880 – 30 October 1955) was a Romanian sociologist, ethnologist, historian, and voluntarist philosopher; a professor at the University of Iași and the University of Bucharest, he served as Romania's Minister of Education in 1932–1933. Gusti was elected a member of the Romanian Academy in 1919, and was its president between 1944 and 1946. He was the main contributor to the creation of a new Romanian school of sociology.

He was a prominent member of the Peasants' Party, and later of the National Peasants' Party into which the former had merged.

== Biography ==
Born in Iași, he began studying Letters at the University of Iași before moving on to the Universität unter den Linden in Berlin and the University of Leipzig, where he studied and completed a doctorate in Philosophy (1904). In 1905, he began the study of Sociology, Law, and Political economy at the Universität unter den Linden.

Gusti was appointed to the Department of Ancient History, Ethics, and Sociology of the University of Iași in 1910, and was one of the main contributors to the creation of a new Romanian school of sociology. He moved to Bucharest in 1920, and began work as a professor at the University of Bucharest, in the Department of Sociology, Ethics, Politics, and Aesthetics of the latter's Faculty of Letters and Philosophy. His lectures became a center of interest inside the academic community, and he attracted students with diverse backgrounds and political convictions, such as the far right Mircea Vulcănescu, the communist Miron Constantinescu, the Austromarxist Henri H. Stahl, and the left-wing artist Lena Constante.

Creator of the Bucharest School of Sociology and several Institutes, he also led, between 1925 and 1948, the intense research of Romanian villages and the publishing of its results as detailed monographs, a work in which he was notably assisted by Gheorghe Vlădescu-Răcoasa and Stahl. In 1936, together with Stahl and Victor Ion Popa, Gusti created the Village Museum in Bucharest, which now bears his name.

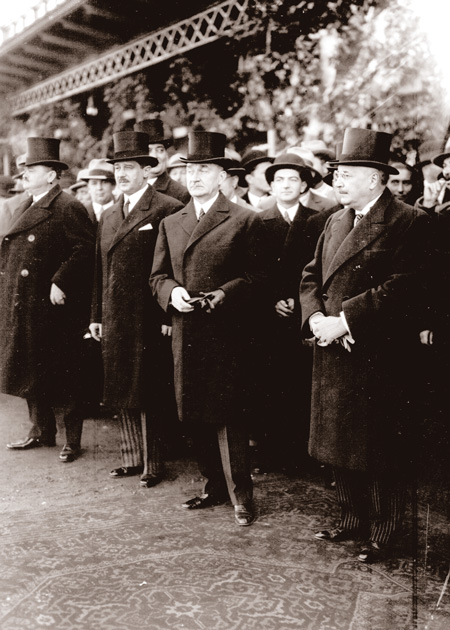
Iuliu Maniu (center) with Gusti (next on the left), in the 1930s

From 9 June 1932 to 13 November 1933 he was Minister of Public Instruction, Religious Affairs and the Arts in the cabinets of Alexandru Vaida-Voevod and Iuliu Maniu. He left the National Peasants' Party after 1938, disagreeing with its decision to oppose the authoritarian regime of King Carol II, and collaborated with the newly created National Renaissance Front. Consequently, he was threatened by the rise of the fascist Iron Guard (with the late 1940 establishment of the National Legionary State); following the Legionary Rebellion and the Guard's defeat, he sent a congratulatory telegram to Conducător Ion Antonescu.

After the end of World War II, Gusti was approached by the new Communist government with offers of collaboration. He was invited to attend official ceremonies inside the Soviet Union, and was a member of the Romanian Society for Friendship with the Soviet Union.

He died in Bucharest in 1955, and was buried at Eternitatea Cemetery in Iași.

== Theory ==
Gusti defined his view on society as dependent on a set of principles:

- Society is composed of "social units", as groups of humans linked by a voluntary organizing activity and interconnected spiritually.
- The essence of life is "social will".
- "Social will" is expressed in economics and spirituality, both of which are regulated by law and politics.
- "Social will" is conditioned by factors which are included in four fundamental and parallel categories: cosmical, biological, psychological, and historical.
- The changes engineered by the factors are known as "social processes".
- The premises of development one can observe in present society, and thus can predict with some accuracy, are known as "social trends".

A creator of the sociological monographic method (as still used by his Bucharest School), Gusti favored and theorised first-hand intensive observation of social units and phenomena, as well as interdisciplinarity, with the research work being carried out through intensive collaboration within the field of social sciences, but also with doctors, agronomists, schoolteachers, etc.

== Main works ==
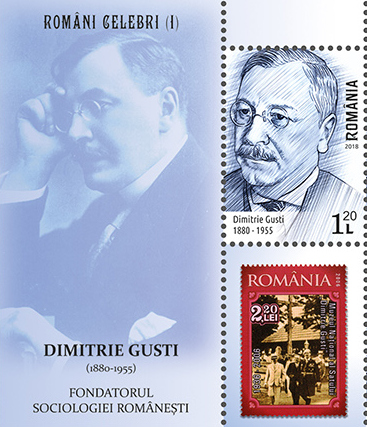
Gusti on a 2018 stamp sheet of Romania

- Egoismus und Altruismus, 1904
- Die soziologischen Betrehungen in der neuen Ethik, 1908
- Cosmologia elenă, 1929
- Sociologia militans, vol. 1, 1935; vols. 2–3, 1946
- Enciclopedia României, vols. I–IV, Bucharest, 1938, 1943
- Cunoaștere și acțiune în serviciul națiunii, 2 vols., 1939
- Problema sociologiei, 1940
- La science de la réalité sociale, 1941

== See also ==
- Dimitrie Gusti National Village Museum

== Cited sources ==
- Lucian Boia, ed. (1998) Miturile comunismului românesc (The Myths of Romanian Communism), Editura Nemira, Bucharest.
  - Ovidiu Bozgan, "Traiectorii universitare: de la stânga interbelică la comunism" ("University Trajectories: from Interwar Left to Communism"), pp. 309–335
  - Adrian Cioroianu, "Lumina vine de la Răsărit. "Noua imagine" a Uniunii Sovietice în România postbelică, 1944–1947" ("The Light Arises in the East. The Soviet Union's "New Image" of Postwar Romania, 1944–1947"), p. 21–68
- (in Romanian) Mircea Vulcănescu, Școala sociologică a lui Dimitrie Gusti ("Dimitrie Gusti's Sociological School")
- Ioan Scurtu, "PNL și PNȚ: Rezerve, nemulțumiri, proteste. Partidele istorice sub guvernarea antonesciano-legionară" ("PNL and PNȚ: Reserves, Dissatisfactions, Protests, Historical Parties under the Antonescu-Legionary Government"), in Dosarele Istoriei, 9/2000
