= Alexandru Mironescu =

Romanian writer

- Born: July 23, 1903; Tecuci, Tecuci County, Kingdom of Romania
- Died: January 20, 1973 (aged 69); Bucharest, Socialist Republic of Romania
- Education: University of Bucharest; Sorbonne University
- Occupation: Prose writer

Alexandru Mironescu (July 23, 1903 – January 20, 1973) was a Romanian prose writer.

Born in Tecuci, his parents were Victor Mironescu and his wife Elena. After attending Dimitrie Cantemir High School in Bucharest, he obtained degrees in chemistry and philosophy from the University of Bucharest. In 1926, he went to Paris to pursue his studies at the Sorbonne, graduating in 1929 with a Ph.D. in physical chemistry. He later obtained a doctorate in philosophy from the University of Bucharest. From 1929, he was a lecturer at the Chemistry Faculty of the University of Bucharest and a teacher at Saint Sava National College. In 1935 he was elected corresponding member of the Romanian Academy of Sciences. He was editor at Semnalul newspaper. Mironescu's first journalistic contribution appeared in Credința newspaper in 1935; exploring both domestic and foreign affairs, he neither commented on daily events as such, nor held firm to a particular ideology, but took the stance of an independent observer, condemning the intellectual elites' isolation with regard to the national, socioeconomic and cultural interest.

Mironescu's first book was the 1937 novel Oamenii nimănui. His work appeared in Evenimentul zilei, Fapta, Familia, Azi, Țara noastră, Vremea, and Revista Fundațiilor Regale. He also wrote the novel Destrămare (1939), the unpublished play Joc în umbră and a few philosophical works. He authored a number of organic chemistry textbooks and treatises, and translated André Gide's Retour de l'U.R.S.S.

A devoted practitioner of hesychasm, Mironescu was, from 1945 to 1948 and again from 1953 to 1958, an adherent of the "Burning Bush" (Rugul Aprins) group within the Romanian Orthodox Church. He stopped publishing after the advent of the Communist regime, and in 1958, together with his son, Șerban, was arrested for his clandestine religious activity. In November of that year, he was sentenced to twenty years' imprisonment for "conspiracy against the social order" by the Bucharest Military Tribunal. After spending time at the Jilava and Aiud prisons, he was freed in November 1963. Even in 1968, at the height of Nicolae Ceaușescu's popularity, he confided in his diary that he viewed the regime as disastrous and doomed to fall.

Mironescu died in Bucharest at age 69. In 2017, he was made Honorary Citizen of his native city, Tecuci.
