= Henri H. Stahl =

Romanian anthropologist

Henri H. Stahl (also known as Henry H. Stahl or H. H. Stahl; 1901 – 9 September 1991) was a Romanian Marxist cultural anthropologist, ethnographer, sociologist, and social historian.

== Biography ==
Born in Bucharest to a family of Alsatian and French-Swiss ancestry, he was the son of Henri Stahl (a promoter of stenography), as well as the younger brother of the sociologist and Social Democratic Party activist Șerban Voinea, and of the novelist Henriette Yvonne Stahl. He was married to Margareta, a known painter.

After attending a local high school, he completed law studies and was awarded a doctorate. Stahl became interested in the work of Dimitrie Gusti, and was consequently one of his most prominent collaborators. Joining the staff of the Department of Sociology, Ethics, Politics, and Aesthetics at the University of Bucharest's Faculty of Letters and Philosophy (where he later became a professor emeritus), Stahl first assisted Gusti and Gheorghe Vlădescu-Răcoasa in the vast interdisciplinary enterprise of creating monographs dedicated to Romanian villages. In 1936, Gusti and Stahl, together with Victor Ion Popa, established the Bucharest Village Museum.

A member of the Criterion society, he made himself known for supporting Austromarxist positions, and, around 1932, was involved in a polemic with the Leninist Lucrețiu Pătrășcanu. In 1934, alongside Alexandru Cristian Tell, Mircea Eliade, Mircea Vulcănescu, and Petru Comarnescu, he sat on the board of Criterion magazine (which claimed not to be linked with the former society). He contributed to Dreapta, a nationalist magazine, but left it after the latter attacked Nicolae Iorga, and cited a conflict in political opinions. By 1938, contrary to the prevalent choices of his generation, Stahl declared himself an anti-fascist.

After World War II and the onset of the communist regime, Stahl was involved in projects to revive the sociology field; he was successful only after 1960, when he began working on Miron Constantinescu's staff at the Romanian Academy's Bibliotheca Historica Romaniae.

In 1990, he was elected a member of the Romanian Academy.

== Works ==
- Tehnica monografiei sociologice (1934)
- Nerej, un village d'une région archaïque, 3 vols. (1939)
- Sociologia satului devălmaș românesc (1946)
- Contribuţii la studiul satelor devălmașe românești, 3 vols. (1950–1965)
- Les anciennes communautés villageoises roumaines; asservissement et pénétration capitaliste (1966)
- Sociologia "concretă" și istorie, in Teorie şi metodă în științele sociale, Vol. VII: Filozofia istoriei. Studii, Editura Politică, Bucarest (1969)
- Teoria și practica investigărilor sociale, 2 vols. (1975)
- Traditional Romanian Village Communities: The Transition from the Communal to the Capitalist Mode of Production in the Danube Region, Cambridge University Press, 1979
- Teorii și ipoteze privind sociologia orânduirii tributale, 1980
- Amintiri şi gânduri din vechea şcoală a monografiilor sociologice, 1981
- Eseuri critice. Despre cultura populară românească, 1983
- Dimitrie Gusti. Studii critice, 1986
- Probleme confuze în istoria socială a României, 1992
- Zoltán Rostás, Monografia ca utopie. Interviuri cu Henri H. Stahl (interviews), 2000
