= Vasile Păun =

Wallachian-Romanian poet, theorist and critic

Vasile Păun (Romanian pronunciation: [vaˈsile pəˈun]; February 9, 1850 – March 1, 1908) was a Wallachian, later Romanian poet, theorist and literary critic.

== Biography ==
Born in Bucharest, he attended gymnasium (Gheorghe Lazăr) and high school (Saint Sava) in his native city. He briefly worked as a government clerk, then graduated from the literature and philosophy faculty of the University of Bucharest. In 1877, he began teaching Romanian and Latin at Cantemir Vodă Gymnasium, becoming its director in 1878. In 1879, he was hired to teach at Saint Sava. Named "principal preceptor" to Prince Ferdinand, heir to the Romanian throne, Păun spent a number of years with the prince in Germany, where he took the occasion to further his own studies. From 1890, he was a professor at Gheorghe Lazăr High School, where he served as director from 1892 to 1903.

=== Literary work ===
He made his literary debut in 1868 with Umbra lui Mihai, a poem in three cantos that appeared in Grigore H. Grandea's Albina Pindului, to which he continued to contribute, sometimes under the pen names Basiliu Dimitrescu and Vasile Demetrescu. Together with Anghel Demetrescu, another prestigious schoolteacher, he belonged to Orientul, a literary society organized around Grandea, and through which he became acquainted with Mihai Eminescu. By 1870, the latter was appealing to Iacob Negruzzi on behalf of his "discouraged friend" Păun, whose poems Negruzzi had declined to publish in Convorbiri Literare. Other magazines to which he submitted poems, as well as prose, criticism and literary reviews include Traian, Columna lui Traian, Foaia Societății "Românismul", Foaia Societății "Renașterea", Povestitorul, România Literară and Românul literar. His first published book was the 1877 Odă la resbel.

=== Other interests ===
After 1890, Păun's interests shifted away from poetry and toward criticism, as well as literary and art theory. He published the biographical sketch Ferdinand de Hohenzolern (1889); Catastrofa Nibelungilor, a "literary critical analysis" (1896); Ficțiune, imagine și comparațiune. Studiu comparativ de literatură poetică (1896); Sihastrul. Poveste poetică (1896) and Înrudirea poeziei cu celelalte arte frumoase (muzica, pictura, plastica și arhitectura) (1898). He wrote for Vatra and for Literatură și artă română, edited by his friend N. Petrașcu. From 1897 to 1899, he was editor-in-chief of Revista societății "Tinerimea română", and co-edited Apărarea națională, where he sometimes signed as Davus or Pavo Zorilă. Until the year of his death, he wrote a weekly review column, "Note și reflexiuni", in Secolul.
