= Tulcea County =

County of Romania

Tulcea County Județul Tulcea
- County
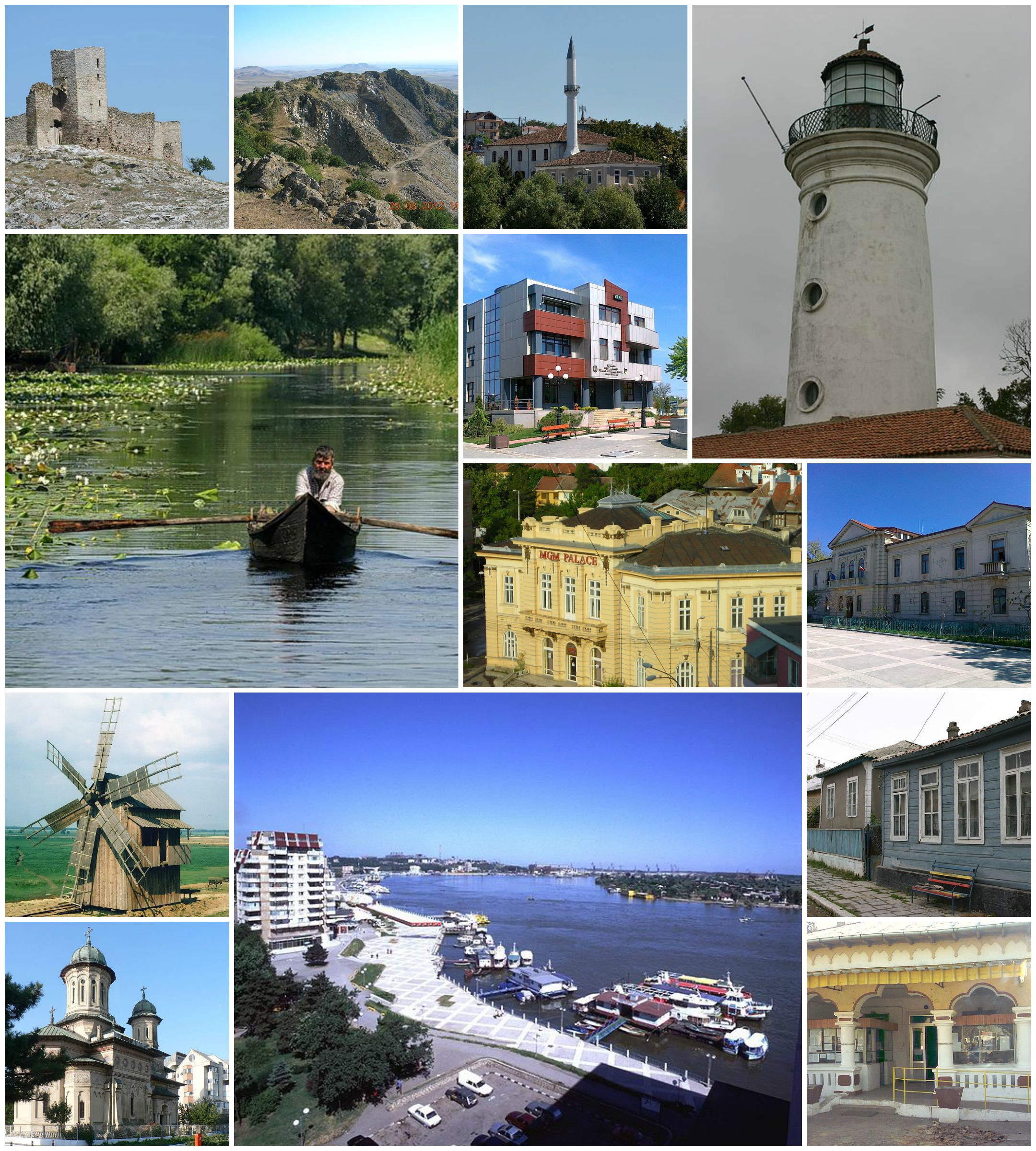

- Flag Coat of arms

- Coordinates: 44.98°N 28.77°E
- Country: Romania
- Development region: Sud-Est
- Historical region: Northern Dobruja
- Capital: Tulcea

Government
  - President of the County Board: Horia Teodorescu (PSD)
  - Prefect: Alexandru Dan Munteanu

Area
  - Total: 8,484 km^{2} (3,276 sq mi)
  - Rank: 4th

Population (2021-12-01)
  - Total: 193,355
  - Rank: 40th
  - Density: 22.79/km^{2} (59.03/sq mi)
- Telephone code: (+40) 240 or (+40) 340
- ISO 3166 code: RO-TL
- GDP (nominal): US$ 1.378 billion (2015)
- GDP per capita: US$ 6,838 (2015)
- Website: County Council; County Prefecture

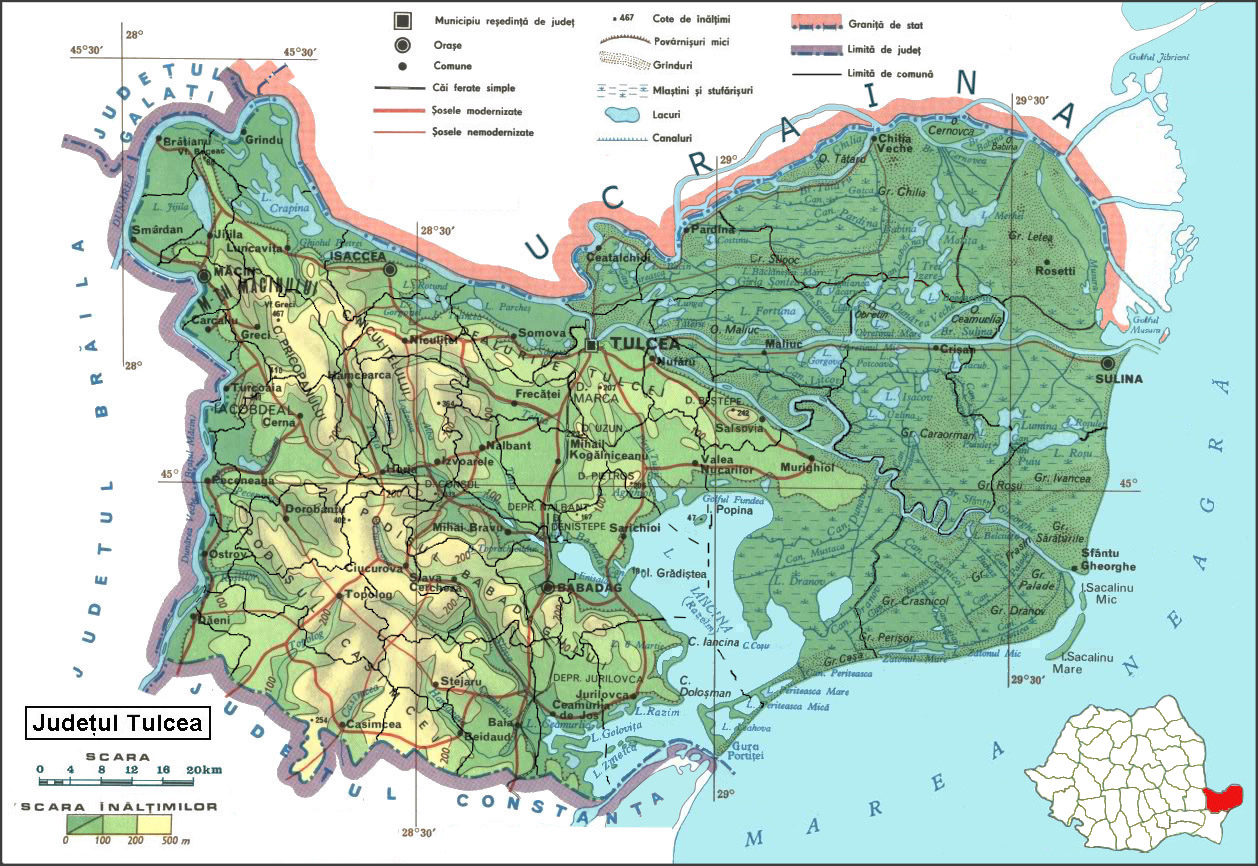
Map of Tulcea County.

Tulcea County (Romanian pronunciation: [ˈtult͡ʃe̯a]) is a county (județ) of Romania, in the historical region Northern Dobruja, with the capital city at Tulcea. It includes in its northeast corner the large and thinly-populated delta of the Danube.

== Demographics ==
In 2021, Tulcea County had a population of 193,355. The population density was 22.8/km^{2}, the lowest among the counties of Romania, due to the inclusion within the area of the lowly-populated Danube estuarial wetlands. The county is also the least populous in the country.

- Romanians - 79.18%
- Russians (Lipovans) - 4.14%
- Roma - 2.05%
- Turks - 0.51%
- Ukrainians - 0.47%
- Greeks - 0.14%
- Tatars - 0.05%
- Bulgarians - 0.02%

In the Danube Delta there is an important community of Russians (Lipovans). In the south of the county there are communities of Turks. The region once was a centre of Islam in Romania.

Year	County population
1948	192,228
1956	223,719 ▲
1966	236,709 ▲
1977	254,531 ▲
1992	270,197 ▲
2002	256,492 ▼
2011	201,462 ▼
2021	193,355 ▼

Ethnicity	2002	2011	2021
Total	256,492	213,083	193,355
Romanian	230,843 (90%)	180,496 (84.71%)	153,094 (79.18%)
Lipovan	16,350 (6.4%)	10,342 (4.85%)	8,010 (4.14%)
Roma	2,272 (0.88%)	3,423 (1.61%)	3,963 (2.05%)
Turks	3,334 (1.3%)	1,674 (0.78%)	993 (0.51%)
Ukrainian	1,279 (0.5%)	1,083 (0.51%)	900 (0.47%)
Greek	1,680 (0.64%)	1,181 (0.55%)	266 (0.14%)
Tatar	179 (0.07%)	119 (0.06%)	106 (0.05%)
Bulgarian	61 (0.02%)	23 (0.01%)	34 (0.02%)
Others	494 (0.19%)	14,742 (6.92%)	25,989 (13.44%)

== Geography ==
The county has a total area of 8,484 km^{2} (3,276 sq mi).

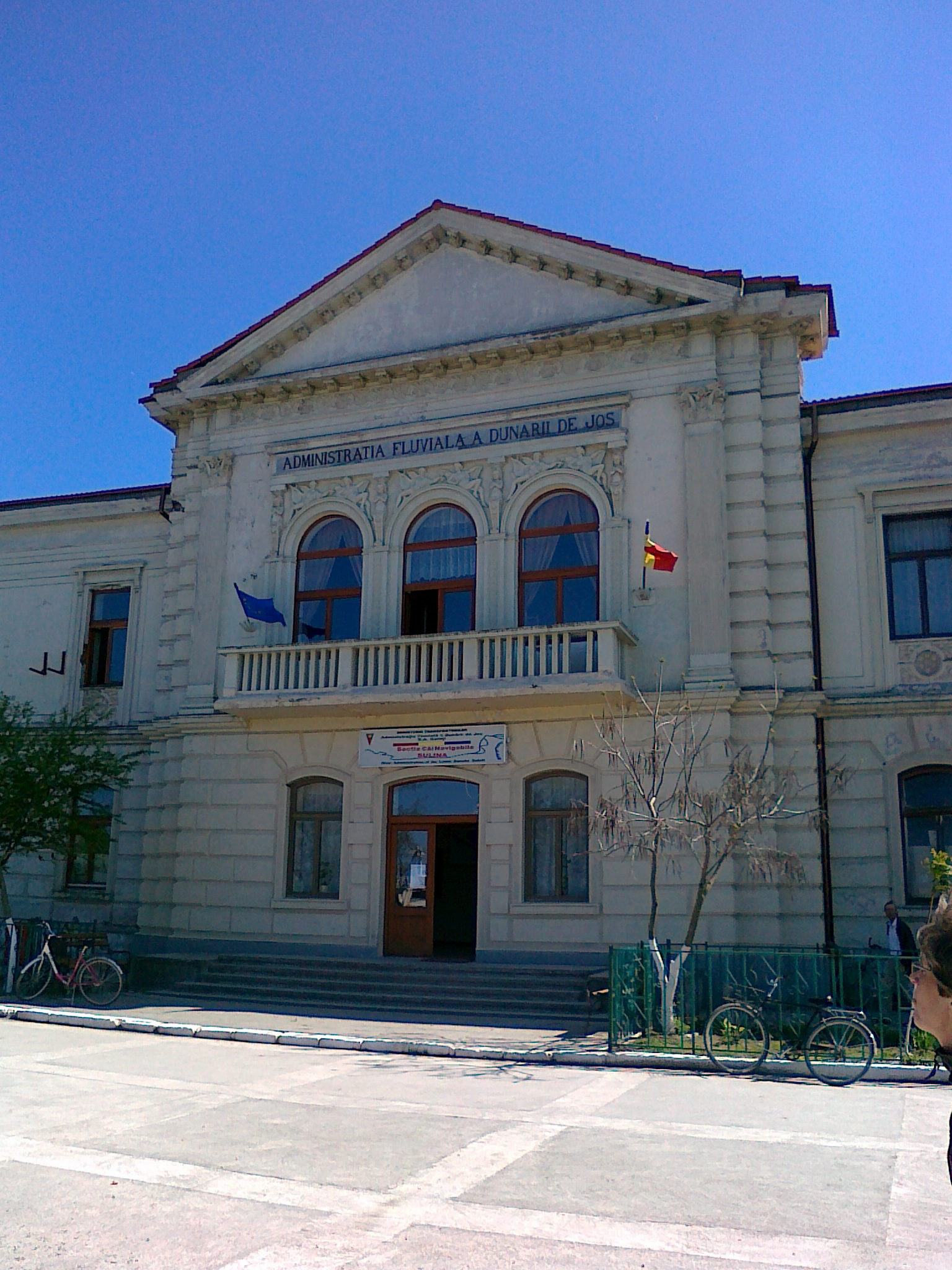
The Palace of the Danube Commission in Sulina, Tulcea County, Romania, from 1868 to 1921

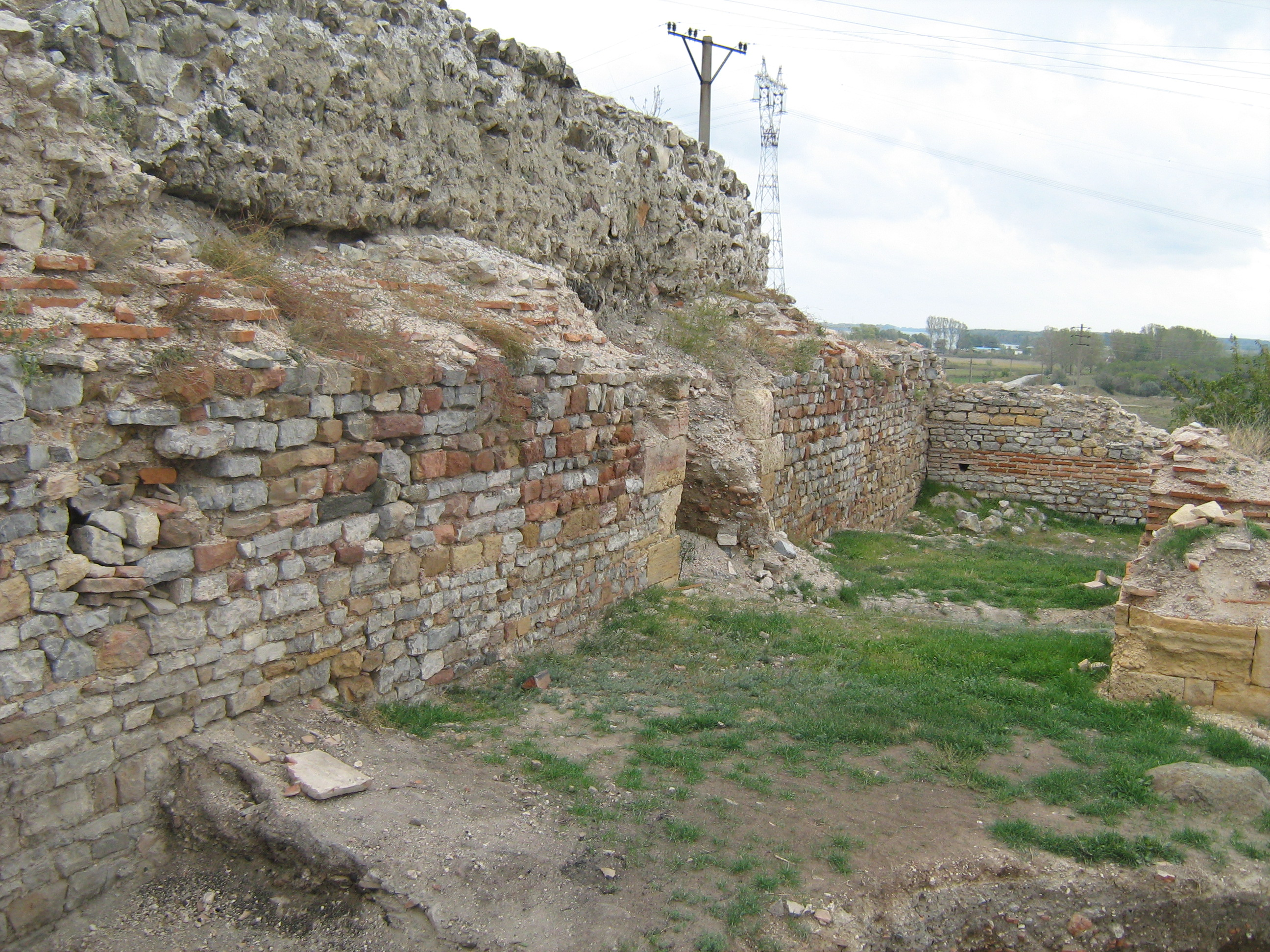
Ruins of the Noviodunum fortress

The most significant feature of Tulcea County is the Danube Delta, which occupies about one third of the entire surface and is located in the north-east side of the county. The Delta has three main branches: the Sulina branch (the only one navigable by large ships) in the middle, the Chilia branch in the north (along the border with Ukraine) and the Sfântu Gheorghe branch in the south.

In the south-east of the county there are two lagoons: Lake Razelm and Lake Sinoe. In the Danube Delta and in the south—in the area between the Sfântu Gheorghe Channel and Lake Razelm—there are countless channels and small lakes. The entire area is included in the UNESCO list of World Heritage Sites and Biosphere reserves.

The Danube River flows around the county in the west and north side. In the west, there is the Măcin Branch which flows on the east side of the Great Brăila Island. From Smârdan (on the opposite side from Brăila) to Pătlăgeanca (close to Tulcea), the Danube has only one large flow of water, around which there is an immense number of lakes and small channels.

In the center of the county, there is the Casincea Plateau and the Măcin Mountains—the remains of a prehistorical mountains range (more than 400 million years old), with the greatest height at about 400 m.

=== Neighbours ===
- Black Sea in the east.
- Brăila County in the west.
- Galați County in the north-west
- Ukraine in the North — the Odesa Oblast.
- Republic of Moldova in the North - Cahul District.
- Constanța County in the south.

== Economy ==
Agriculture and fishing are the main occupations, involving about 48% of the population. Industry is concentrated in the large towns only.

The predominant industries in the county are:

- Food industry;
- Textile industry;
- Ship building industry;
- Metallurgy — aluminium;
- Chemical industry;
- Construction materials.

== Tourism ==
Tourism is an important activity in the county, the Danube Delta being one of the most visited areas in Romania.

The main destinations for tourists are:

- The Danube Delta
  - The town of Sulina—the lowest town downstream of the Danube.
  - The areas around Sfântu Gheorghe, Mahmudia, Crișan, Caraorman, Chilia Veche.
- The city of Tulcea.
- The Roman fort of Halmyris.

== Politics ==
The Tulcea County Council, renewed at the 2024 local elections, consists of 30 counsellors, with the following party composition:

Party	Seats	Current County Council
Social Democratic Party (PSD)	13	
National Liberal Party (PNL)	11	
Alliance for the Union of Romanians (AUR)	6	

2020 local elections

Party	Seats	Current County Council
National Liberal Party (PNL)	13	
Social Democratic Party (PSD)	12	
PRO Romania (PRO)	3	
People's Movement Party (PMP)	2	

== Administrative divisions ==
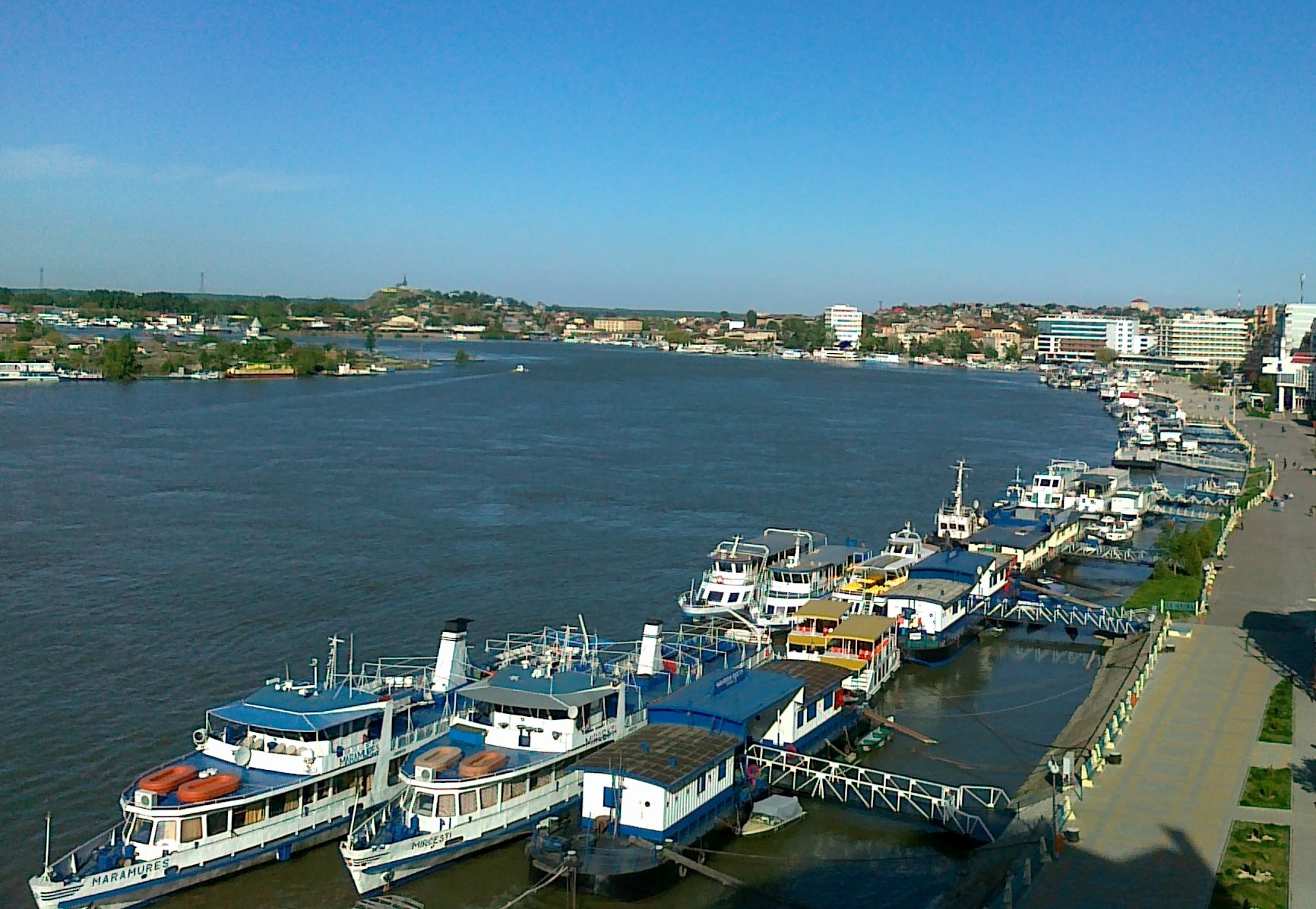
Tulcea harbour

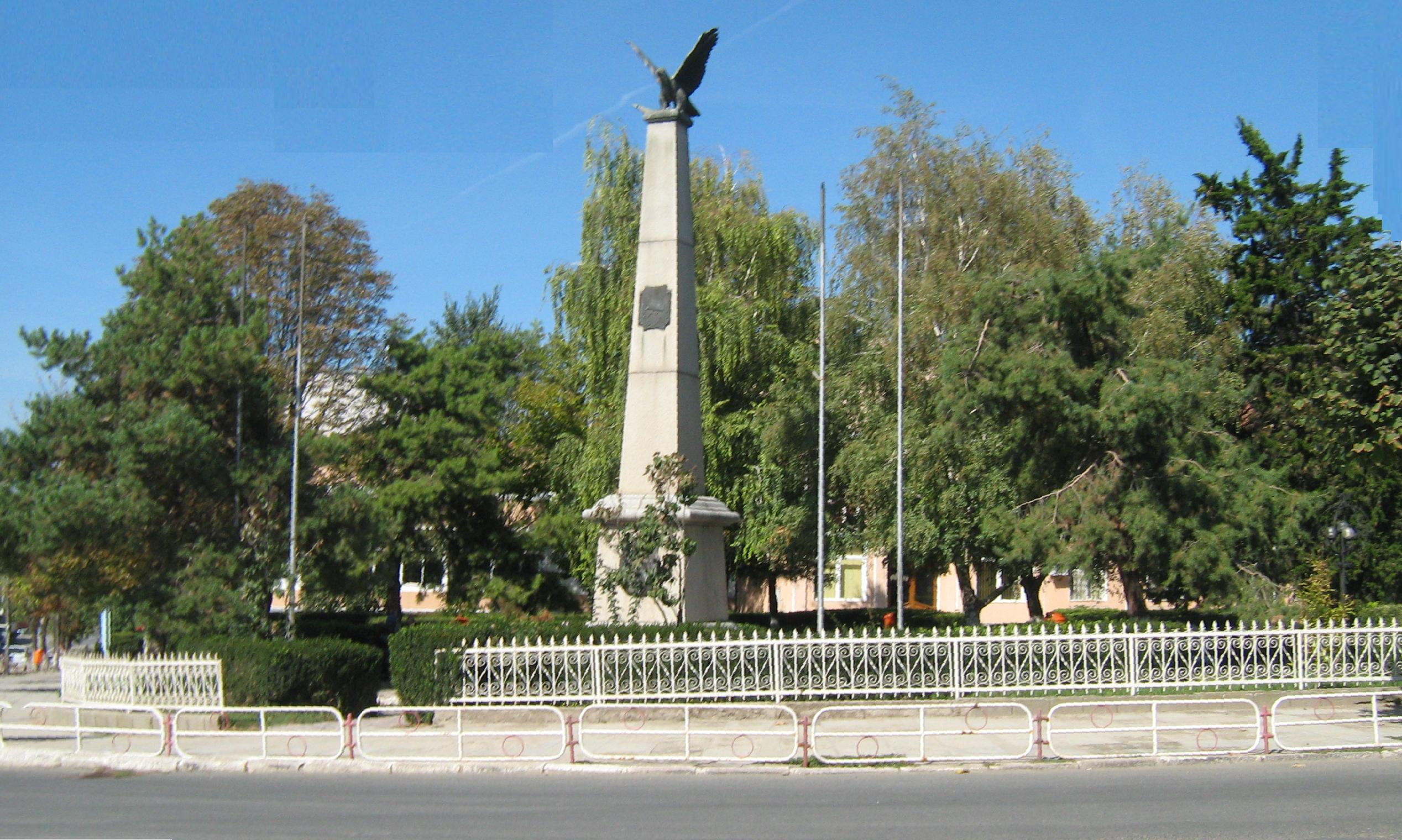
Măcin

Tulcea County has 1 municipality, 4 towns and 46 communes.

Municipalities

- Tulcea — capital city; population: 65,624 (as of 2021)

Towns

- Babadag
- Isaccea
- Măcin
- Sulina

Communes

- Baia
- Baidaud
- Beștepe
- C. A. Rosetti
- Carcaliu
- Casimcea
- Ceamurlia de Jos
- Ceatalchioi
- Cerna
- Chilia Veche
- Ciucurova
- Crișan
- Dăeni
- Dorobanțu
- Frecăței
- Greci
- Grindu
- Hamcearca
- Horia
- I. C. Brătianu (Zaclău, 23 August)
- Izvoarele
- Jijila
- Jurilovca (Unirea)
- Luncavița
- Mahmudia
- Maliuc
- Mihai Bravu
- Mihai Kogălniceanu
- Murighiol (Independența)
- Nalbant
- Niculițel
- Nufăru
- Ostrov
- Pardina (1 Mai)
- Peceneaga
- Sarichioi
- Sfântu Gheorghe
- Slava Cercheză
- Smărdan
- Somova
- Stejaru
- Topolog
- Turcoaia
- Valea Nucarilor
- Valea Teilor
- Văcăreni

== Historical county ==
Județul Tulcea
- County (Județ)
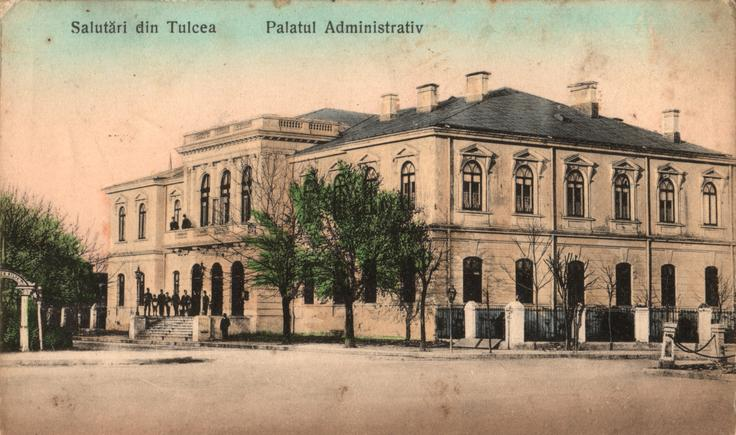
- The Tulcea prefecture building from the interwar period, now the Tulcea Art Museum.

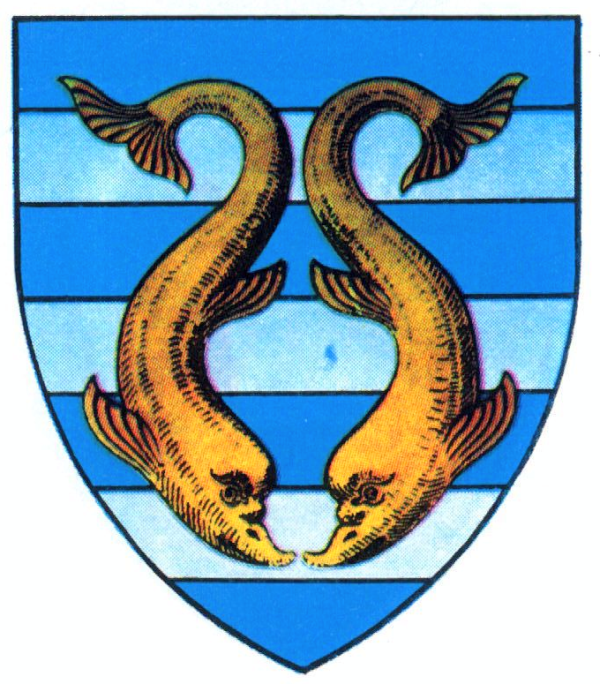
- Coat of arms

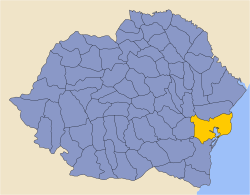
- Country: Romania
- Historic region: Dobrogea
- Capital city (reședință de județ): Tulcea

Area
  - Total: 8,628 km^{2} (3,331 sq mi)

Population (1930)
  - Total: 184,038
  - Density: 21.33/km^{2} (55.25/sq mi)
- Time zone: UTC+2 (EET)
  - Summer (DST): UTC+3 (EEST)

Historically, the county was located in the southeastern part of Greater Romania, in the region of north Dobruja. The borders of the historic county coincide with those of the present county. It bordered on the west with Brăila County, northwest with Covurlui County, to the north with Ismail County, to the south by Constanța County, and to the east and south-east with the Black Sea.

=== Administration ===
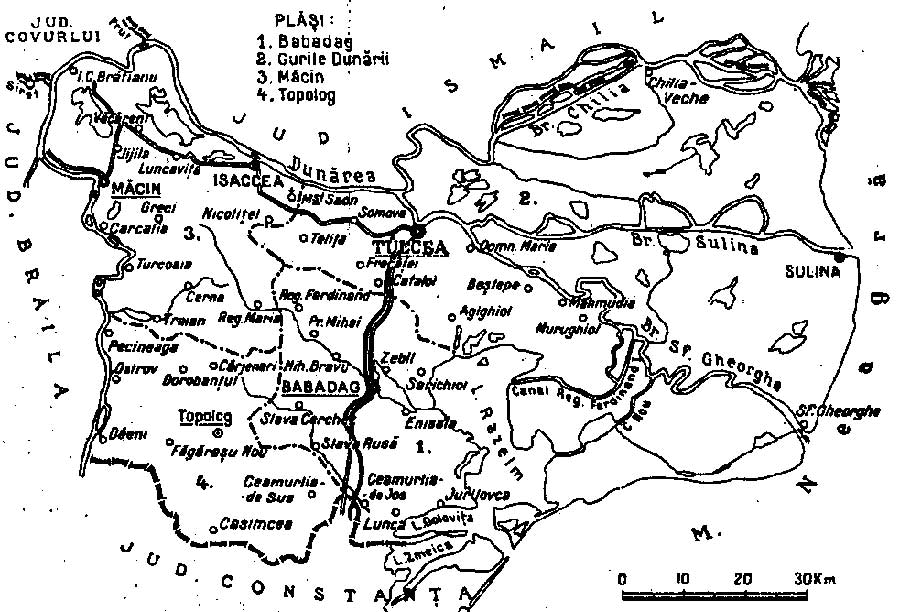
Map of Tulcea County as constituted in 1938.

The county was originally divided administratively into four districts (plăși):

1. Plasa Babadag, headquartered at Babadag
2. Plasa Gurile Dunării, headquartered at Tulcea
3. Plasa Măcin, headquartered at Măcin
4. Plasa Topolog, headquartered at Topolog

As in the present day there were five towns (cities): Tulcea (county headquarters), Babadag, Măcin, Isaccea and Sulina.

=== Population ===
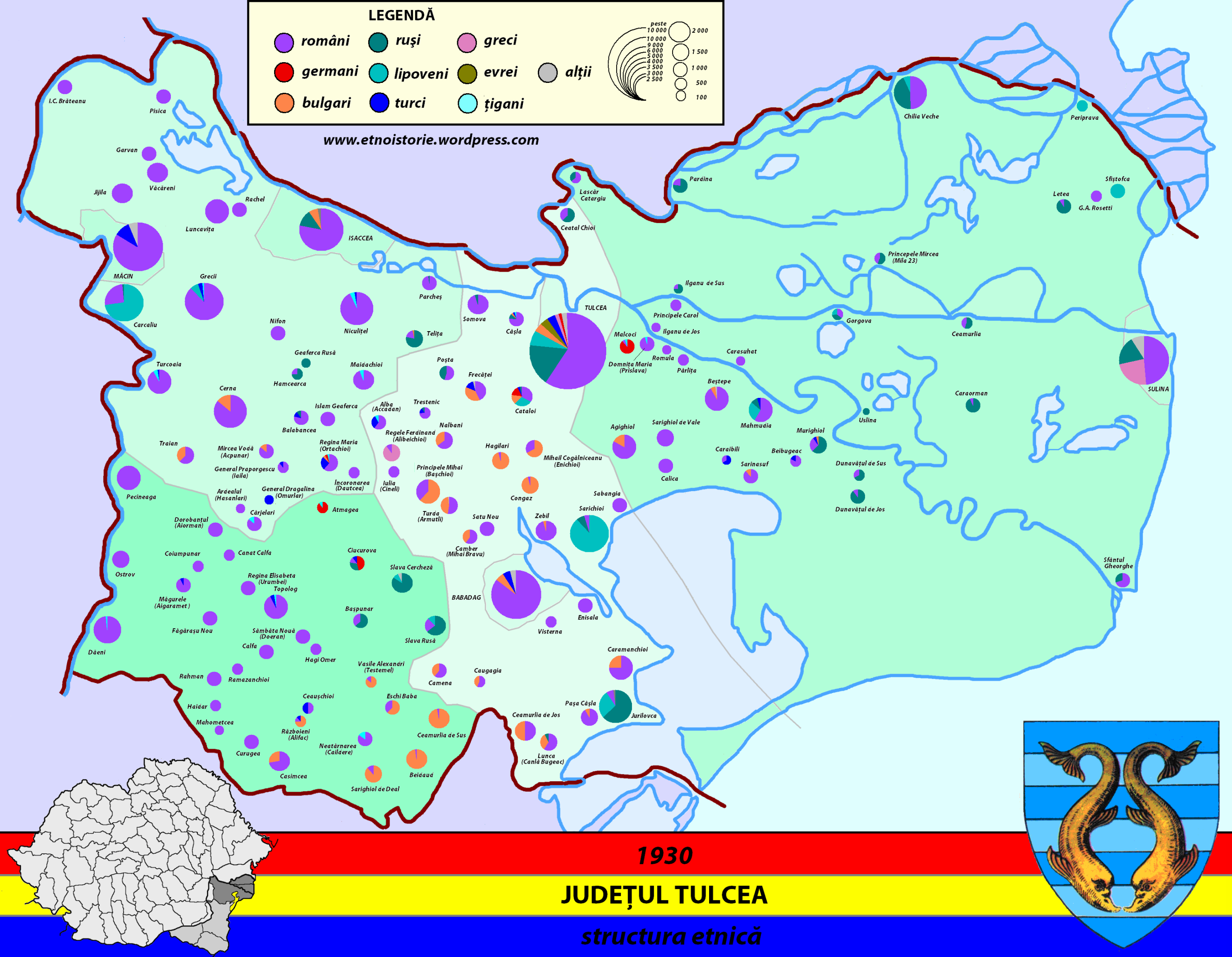
Map of Tulcea County's ethnic groups as reported in the 1930 census.

According to the 1930 census data, the county population was 184,038 inhabitants, ethnically divided as follows: 62.6% Romanians, 12.2% Russians, 10.6% Bulgarians, 2.5% Turks, 1.7% Greeks, 1.3% Germans, as well as other minorities. From the religious point of view, the population was 85.8% Eastern Orthodox, 8.3% Old-Rite Lipovan Orthodox, 2.8% Muslim, 1.5% Roman Catholic, 0.6% Lutheran, as well as other minorities.

==== Urban population ====
In 1930, the county's urban population was 41,632 inhabitants, comprising 64.7% Romanians, 12.8% Russians, 5.5% Turks, 4.4% Greeks, 3.3% Bulgarians, 2.5% Jews, 0.8% Germans, as well as other minorities. Mother tongues among the urban population were Romanian (69.4%), followed by Russian (15.0%), Turkish (5.5%), Greek (3.9%), Yiddish (1.5%), as well as other minorities. From the religious point of view, the urban population was composed of 87.5% Eastern Orthodox, 5.7% Muslim, 2.6% Jewish, 1.9% Roman Catholic, as well as other minorities.
