= Filimon Sîrbu (disambiguation) =

From 1948 to 1964, three places in Romania were named after communist activist Filimon Sârbu (using the orthography of the day):

- Herepeia, a village in Vețel Commune, Hunedoara County, and Sârbu's birthplace
- Izvoarele, a commune in Tulcea County
- Moviliţa, a village in Topraisar Commune, Constanţa County
