= Alum Tulcea Power Station =

Alum Tulcea Power Plant
- Country: Romania
- Location: Tulcea County
- Status: Approved
- Owner: Alum Tulcea

Thermal power station
- Primary fuel: Natural gas

Power generation
- Units operational: 5
- Nameplate capacity: 250 MW

The Alum Tulcea Power Station will be a large electricity producer in Romania, having 5 natural gas-fired groups of 50 MW each totalling an installed capacity of 250 MW and an electricity generation capacity of around 0.6 TWh/year.

The power plant will be situated in the Tulcea County (Eastern Romania) near Alum Tulcea's industrial facility in Tulcea.
