= Sfântu Gheorghe, Tulcea =

Sfântu Gheorghe
- Commune
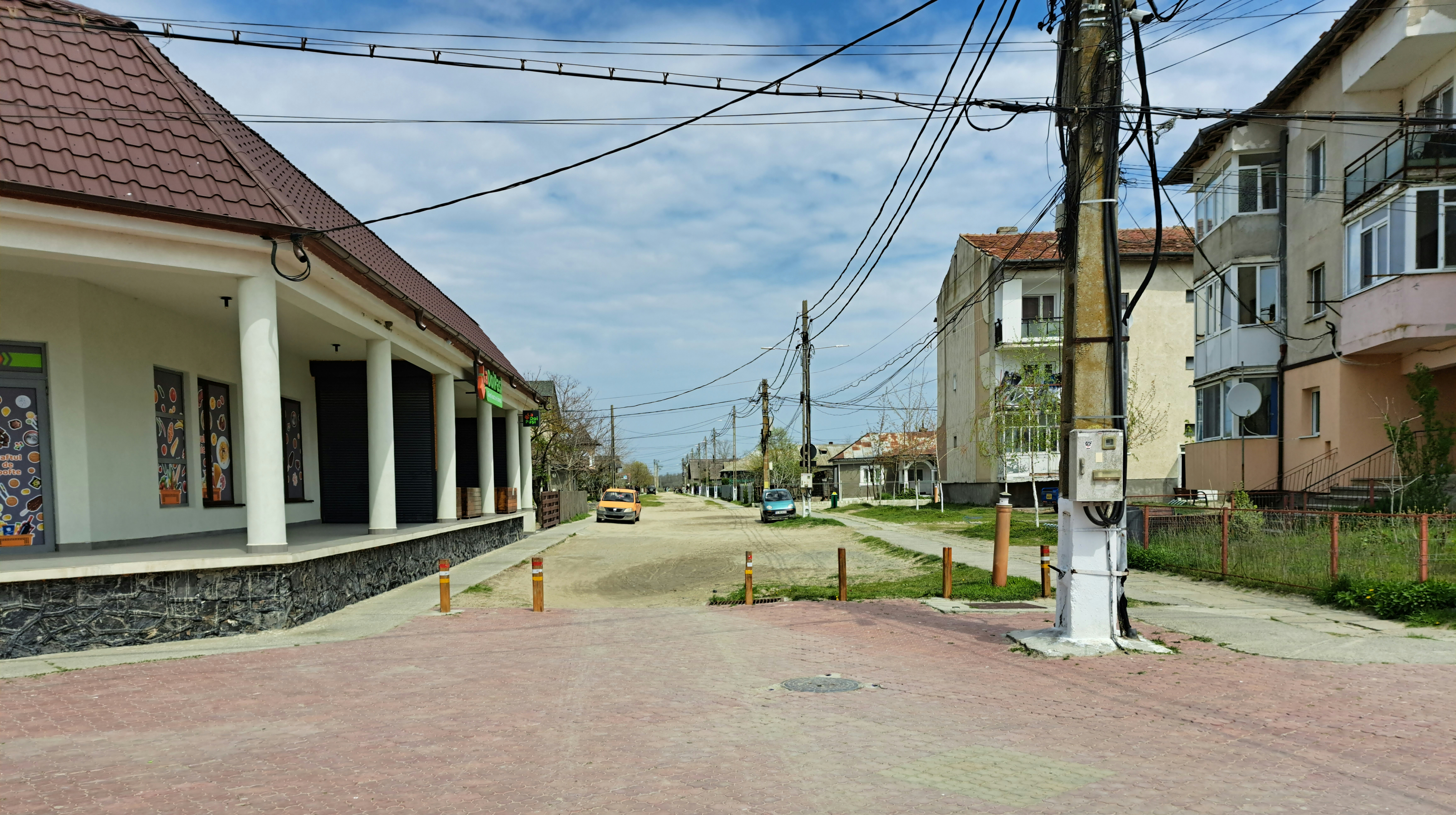
- Street in Sfântu Gheorghe

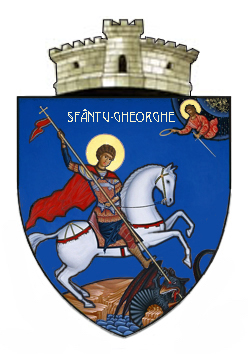
- Coat of arms

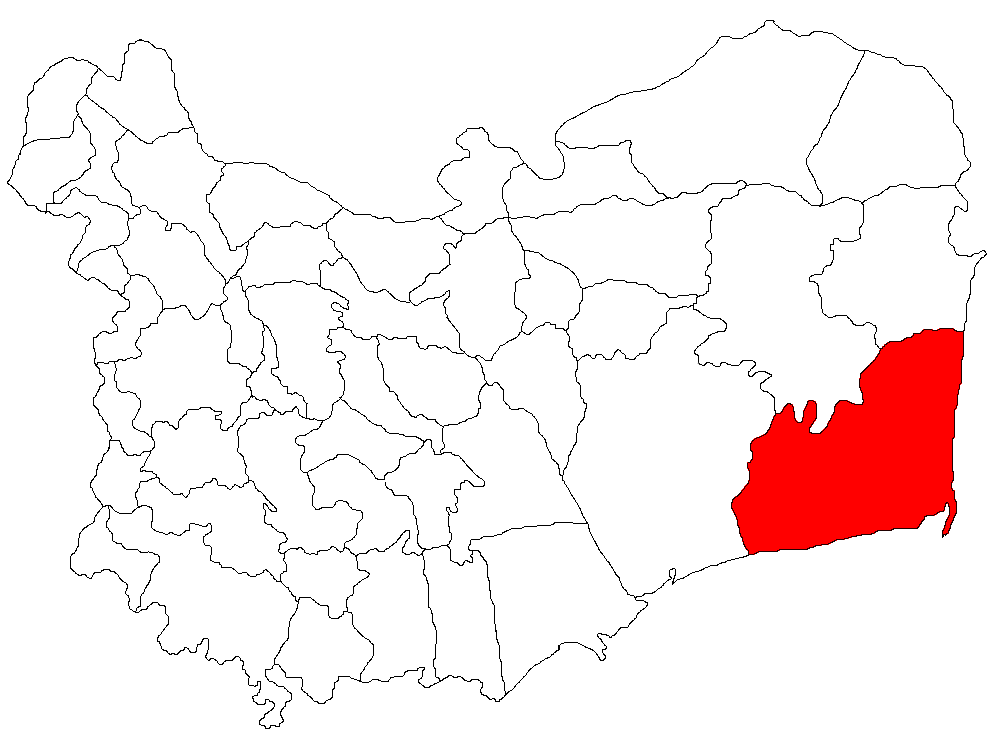
- Location in Tulcea County

- Location in Romania
- Coordinates: 44°54′N 29°36′E
- Country: Romania
- County: Tulcea

Government
  - Mayor (2024–2028): Claudiu-Dragoș Cladiade (PNL)
- Area: 605.76 km^{2} (233.89 sq mi)
- Elevation: 1 m (3.3 ft)
- Population (2021-12-01): 639
  - Density: 1.05/km^{2} (2.73/sq mi)
- Time zone: UTC+02:00 (EET)
  - Summer (DST): UTC+03:00 (EEST)
- Postal code: 827195
- Area code: +40 x40
- Vehicle reg.: TL
- Website: www.primariasfantugheorghetulcea.ro

Sfântu Gheorghe (Turkish: Kadirlez) is a commune in Tulcea County, Northern Dobruja, Romania. On older maps, other names for the locality appear, such as Kidrillis, Cadîrlez, or Catarlezi, which derive from the Turkish name Kadırler meaning "The Galleys", or Aios Iorgos, which derives from the Greek name. It is located at the end of the southern arm of the Danube near the Black Sea, in the Dobruja region. It is composed of a single village, Sfântu Gheorghe.

== Description ==
Sfântu Gheorghe has a center with a town hall, a pub and some food stores. It is surrounded by one-storey houses, some of which have a Byzantine influence.

== Name ==
An old fishing settlement, Sfântu Gheorghe is documented in historical records from the 14th century, when economic development increased the role of Italian (Genoese) merchants, especially around the Sfântu Gheorghe branch (of the Danube). During that period, the Genoese held a true monopoly over the Black Sea waters, trading fish caught at the mouths of the Danube. For this reason, the locality of San-Giorgio also appears on the map of the Genoese cartographer Visconti from the year 1318.Another legend says that in the year 1821, a Turkish warship carrying a pasha arrived in the village. On that day, the sound of the shepherds' flutes (caval) and the fishermen's songs echoed through the village. It happened to be St. George's Day, and in honor of this holiday, the pasha named the village "Katarlez" (where the "z" is pronounced like "ț" [ts]), meaning St. George.After bearing the two names, San-Giorgio and Katarlez, the locality eventually reached its current name, Sfântu Gheorghe, which originates from the patron saint celebration of the old church. Officially, the name was adopted much later, after 1883, as evidenced by land endowment documents.

== History ==
According to the elders, the village was formed, in part, by political refugees arriving from Russia during the reign of Empress Catherine the Great, fleeing the military conscription that used to last for 25 years. Fishermen and hunters by trade, they settled at the mouth of the St. George branch and reached an understanding with Greek merchants, to whom they gave their catch in exchange for the necessities of life. Around the year 1735, Zaporozhians (Ukrainians), "hoholi" or "Cossacks," also arrived here. Following them, as a result of other official colonizations driven by the interests of the Ottoman and Tsarist Empires, Lipovans came from Russia, having been driven away by Patriarch Nikon. After some time, conflicts arose between them and the Ukrainians, leading the Lipovans to leave and establish the villages of Jurilovca and Sarichioi. The first Romanians settled in these parts at the beginning of the 19th century, specifically in the year 1810. In that year, a few shepherds with their flocks, coming from the foothills of the Făgăraș Mountains and led by a head shepherd named Niculea, settled on the sandbank (grind) that today bears the name of Grindul Nicu. The name of the sandbank comes from the shepherd's name, except that, over time, the last syllable was lost. During Napoleon Bonaparte's campaign in Russia, the Russian authorities retreated from his path. Russian serfs took advantage of this and fled to Dobruja, and some, moving down toward the sea, coexisted with Niculea's shepherds. At that time, the Black Sea was teeming with Greek ships trading with Moldavia along the Sulina branch. In 1820, some of these ships began to detour to Sfântu Gheorghe with all kinds of fruit, which the fishermen took in exchange for fish. Over time, fish production increased due to people coming from other villages who remained here. The fishermen began to transport the fish to Galați on their own. In the beginning, there was only one fish-processing facility (cherhana), belonging to Costenco, but around 1862, two more were established by the brothers Costache and Neculache Valsamache. Around that time, Iani Melanos came from Tulcea and traded in alcohol. He took possession of two of the facilities, generating large profits. In 1876, the fishermen established an association that lasted for 6 years. In 1920, the "Marea Neagră" (Black Sea) Cooperative was established with 82 members to protect the interests of the fishermen and to supply the village with food, fishing gear, clothing, etc. After a few prosperous years, the institution went bankrupt in 1929.

The village's first church was built in 1820 but burned down in 1880. It was rebuilt that same year. In 1896, the second one also burned down, but was rebuilt once again.

By 1879, the Sfântu Gheorghe Post Office had already been established for light mail. Runs were made by light carts (cariole) and carriages on the Sfântu Gheorghe–Sulina route once a week. During the winter, however, due to ice, mail could not be transported on the Danube or through the Delta channels. The only solution was to transport it by cart to Gârla Împuțita, where it would be picked up by a cart sent from Sulina. In 1882, a military outpost (pichet) was built in Sfântu Gheorghe. In 1892, the telegraph was introduced with limited service, followed by the telephone in 1894. The telegraph office also had a bureau, and the village was in telephone contact with all other rural and urban communes. The village has had a school since 1904. During World War II, the telephone network was disrupted due to bombings. The local administration was forced to take measures to reinforce the poles and maintain the telephone network in good condition.

In 1934, the gendarmerie post operated under the leadership of Dumitru Jianu in rented premises. In 1939, the construction of a new facility was approved, and a fire pump was acquired.

In the year 1942, a 500-meter-long flood defense dike was built in Sfântu Gheorghe. In 1978, during a storm, the village filled with water, forcing people to get around by boat. The waters receded after three days. The authorities continued the diking process, and today the village is surrounded by a 6.5 km dike that protects it from the waters of the Danube and the Black Sea. Also in 1942, a weather station was built, and a weaving and reed-mat workshop was established. Between 1963 and 1970, the weather station was relocated, and it has had its own dedicated building since 1969.

== Climate ==
Sfântu Gheorghe has a cold semi-arid climate (BSk) according to the Köppen climate classification. It has warm and humid summers, tropical nights not being uncommon and very warm winters by Romanian standards. The highest temperature ever recorded at the Sfântu Gheorghe meteorological station is 35.8 °C, measured on 7 August 2012, and the lowest temperature ever recorded is −18.6 °C, on 10 January 2017. The town has very low precipitation, that amounts to only 380mm, being one of the lowest in Romania, and it is very sunny, averaging 2300 hours of sunshine per year, going as far as 2600 hours in clear years.

Climate data for Sfântu Gheorghe (elevation 1m, 2014–2026 normals, extremes 1981–present)
Month	Jan	Feb	Mar	Apr	May	Jun	Jul	Aug	Sep	Oct	Nov	Dec	Year
Record high °C (°F)	14.5 (58.1)	17.9 (64.2)	26.7 (80.1)	28.4 (83.1)	30.1 (86.2)	33.7 (92.7)	36.3 (97.3)	35.8 (96.4)	34.3 (93.7)	28.7 (83.7)	24.0 (75.2)	17.6 (63.7)	36.3 (97.3)
Mean daily maximum °C (°F)	5.7 (42.3)	7.0 (44.6)	10.1 (50.2)	15.0 (59.0)	20.3 (68.5)	26.1 (79.0)	28.4 (83.1)	28.4 (83.1)	24.0 (75.2)	17.8 (64.0)	12.3 (54.1)	8.0 (46.4)	16.9 (62.5)
Daily mean °C (°F)	2.4 (36.3)	3.9 (39.0)	6.7 (44.1)	11.3 (52.3)	16.4 (61.5)	21.8 (71.2)	23.6 (74.5)	23.4 (74.1)	19.2 (66.6)	13.6 (56.5)	8.9 (48.0)	4.8 (40.6)	13.0 (55.4)
Mean daily minimum °C (°F)	−0.9 (30.4)	0.8 (33.4)	3.3 (37.9)	7.5 (45.5)	12.5 (54.5)	17.4 (63.3)	18.8 (65.8)	18.4 (65.1)	14.4 (57.9)	9.4 (48.9)	5.4 (41.7)	1.6 (34.9)	9.0 (48.3)
Record low °C (°F)	−18.6 (−1.5)	−18.5 (−1.3)	−13.7 (7.3)	−2.5 (27.5)	4.4 (39.9)	8.6 (47.5)	10.9 (51.6)	7.7 (45.9)	2.1 (35.8)	−5.5 (22.1)	−8.6 (16.5)	−17.0 (1.4)	−18.6 (−1.5)
Average precipitation mm (inches)	33.6 (1.32)	23.9 (0.94)	22.4 (0.88)	31.3 (1.23)	23.8 (0.94)	27.7 (1.09)	28.3 (1.11)	29.2 (1.15)	31.8 (1.25)	53.6 (2.11)	49.7 (1.96)	30.6 (1.20)	385.9 (15.18)
Average precipitation days (≥ 1.0 mm)	5.8	4.9	4.3	4.7	4.7	3.8	3.3	2.2	3.2	4.8	6.2	6.1	54
Mean monthly sunshine hours	44.9	70.2	189.0	201.7	295.6	350.5	342.3	275.5	206.5	152.6	123.9	46.1	2,298.8
Source 1: Meteomanz (2014–2026); Infoclimat (1980–2010)
Source 2: Clima comunei Sfântu Gheorghe

== Economy ==
Inhabitants fish and work as tourist guides for visitors of the channels of the Danube.

== The Sfântu Gheorghe Film Festival ==
Sfântu Gheorghe hosts the Anonimul International Independent Film Festival.

== Sightseeing ==
- The Danube channels

== Gallery ==
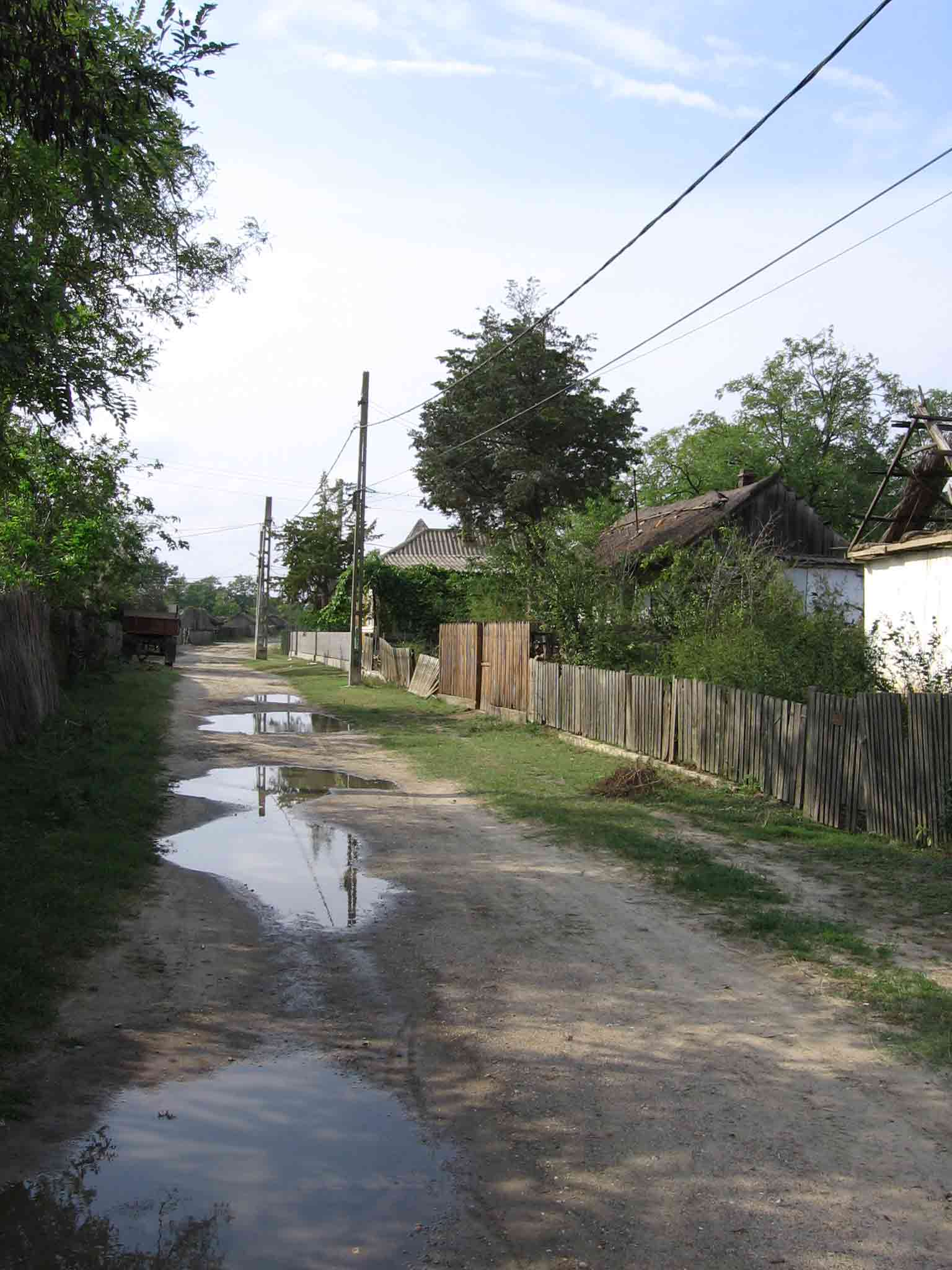
Street in Sfântu Gheorghe

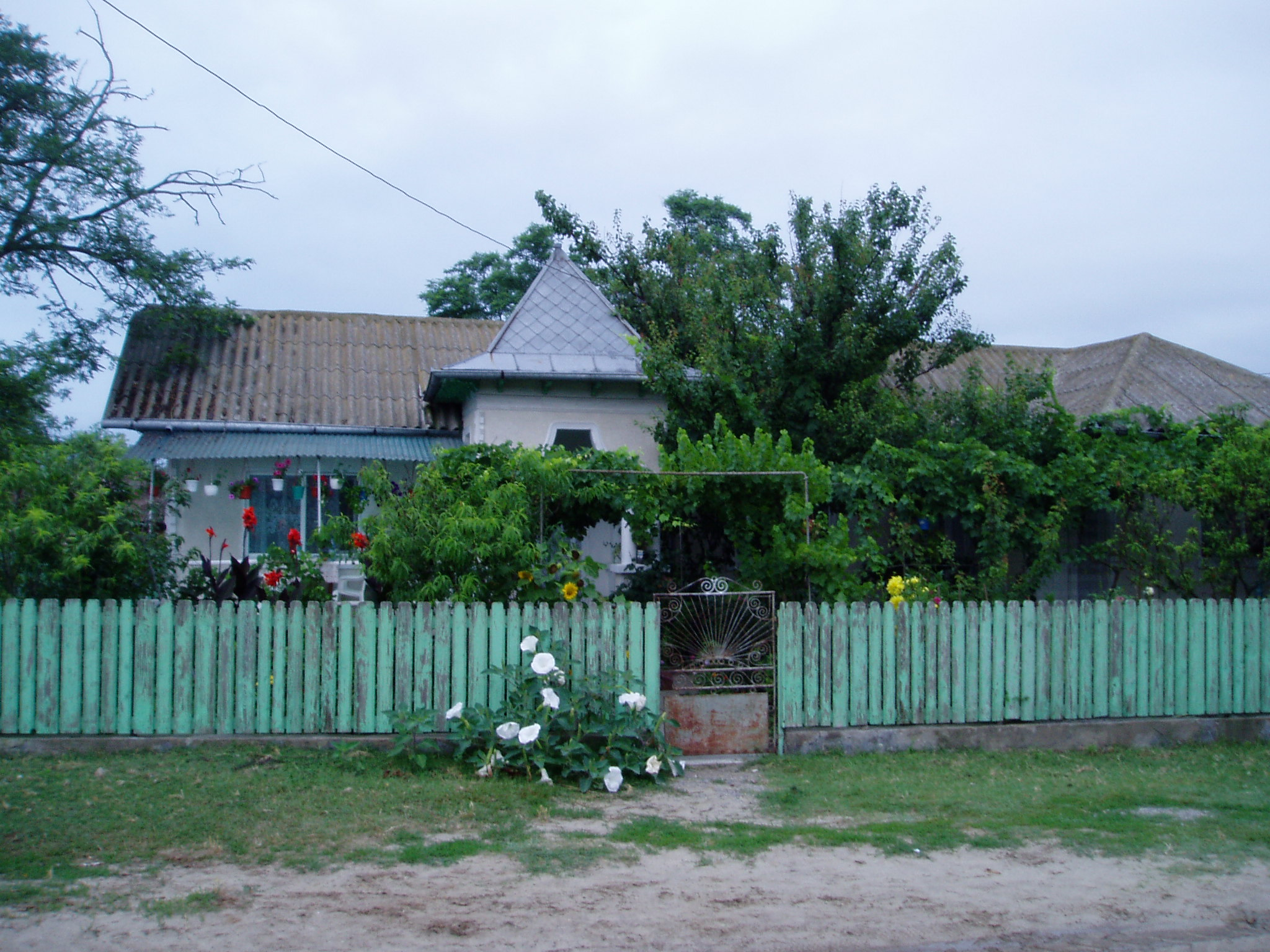
House in Sfântu Gheorghe

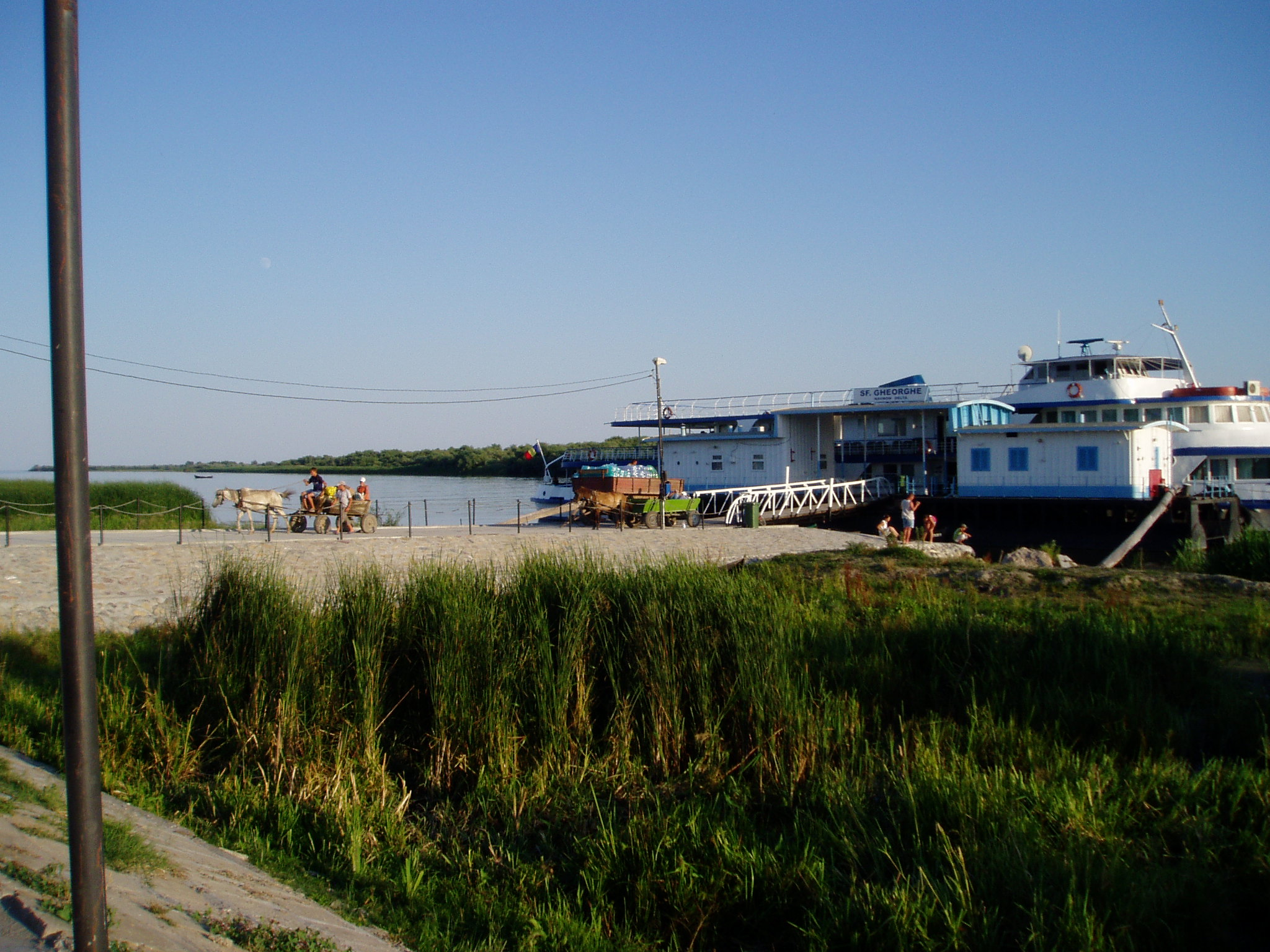
Port of Sfântu Gheorghe
