= Armutlia =

Armutlia may refer to several places in Romania:

- Turda, a village in Mihai Bravu commune, Tulcea County
- Periș, a former village in Independența commune, Constanța County
