= Izvoarele, Tulcea =

Izvoarele
- Commune
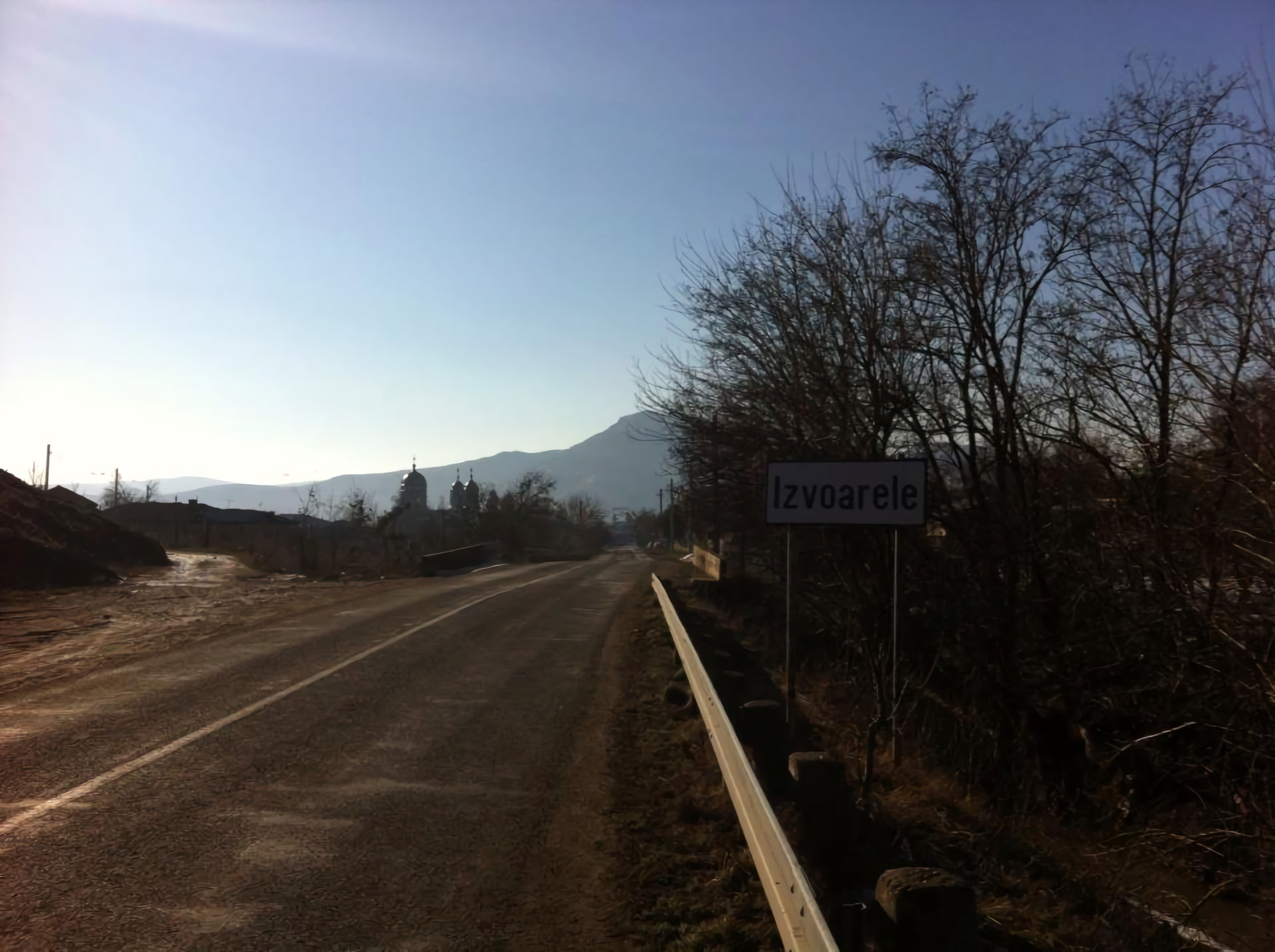
- Entrance to Izvoarele

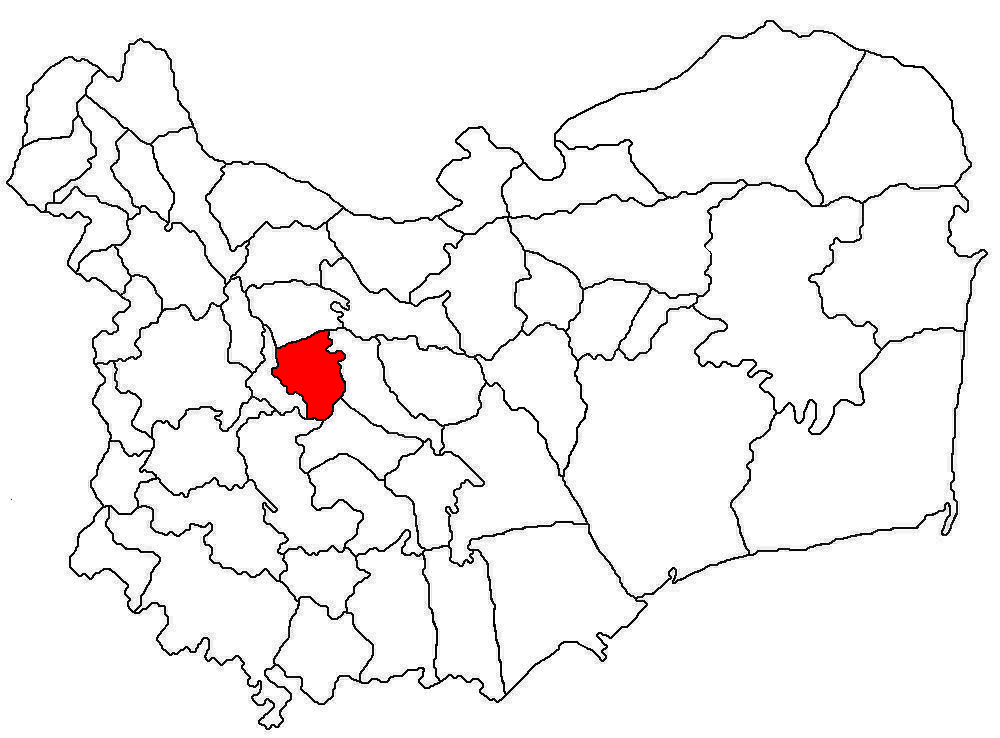
- Location in Tulcea County

- Location in Romania
- Coordinates: 45°3′N 28°32′E
- Country: Romania
- County: Tulcea
- Subdivisions: Izvoarele, Alba, Iulia

Government
  - Mayor (2024–2028): George Ghiorghe (PNL)
- Area: 52 km^{2} (20 sq mi)
- Elevation: 77 m (253 ft)
- Population (2021-12-01): 1,760
  - Density: 34/km^{2} (88/sq mi)
- Time zone: UTC+02:00 (EET)
  - Summer (DST): UTC+03:00 (EEST)
- Postal code: 827105
- Area code: +40 x40
- Vehicle reg.: TL
- Website: www.primaria-izvoarele.ro

Izvoarele (historically Alibeichioi and then Regele Ferdinand; called Filimon Sîrbu from 1948 to 1964, Izvoarele since 1965; Greek: Ιζβοάρελε; Turkish: Alibeköy) is a commune in Tulcea County, Northern Dobruja, Romania. It is composed of three villages: Alba, Iulia, and Izvoarele.

== Location ==
The commune is located in the central-west part of the county, 30 km (19 mi) southwest of the county seat, Tulcea. It is crossed by national road DN22F, which starts in Nalbant, 7 km (4.3 mi) to the east (where it meets DN22A) and ends in Horia, 7.5 km (4.7 mi) to the west (where it meets DN22D).

== History and Greek community ==
Izvoarele was founded by Greeks from Saranta Ekklisies, when they, in order to avoid Turkish retaliation during the Greek Revolution of 1821, followed the Imperial Russian Army (which had reached Edirne) and settled in the area. Initially, their plan was to settle in the Russian Empire, but in 1830 they decided to return to Greece. On their way to their homeland, they were stopped in this area and remained there. This became perhaps the largest purely Greek community in Europe excluding Greece.

In Izvoarele, a church operates in the Greek language and there is a Greek school that has been banned at times. Greek school classes continue today at the Cultural Center of the Greek Community. There is also a new Greek restaurant in Izvoarele named "ELINIKO" (meaning Greek) that opened in 2024. The main road of Izvoarele is "Str. Megas Alexandros" (Romanized Greek for Alexander the Great).

On January 22, 2023, a twinning ceremony was held between the municipality of Paionia (of Kilkis, Greece) and the community of Izvoarele.

== Demographics ==
At the 2011 census, the commune has 2,049 inhabitants; of the residents for whom data were available, 54.4% were Romanians and 45.3% Greeks. By the 2021 census, the population had decreased to 1,760; of those, 89.77% were Romanians and 2.05% Greeks.

== Natives ==
- Ilie Floroiu (born 1952), long-distance runner
