= Maliuc =

- Commune
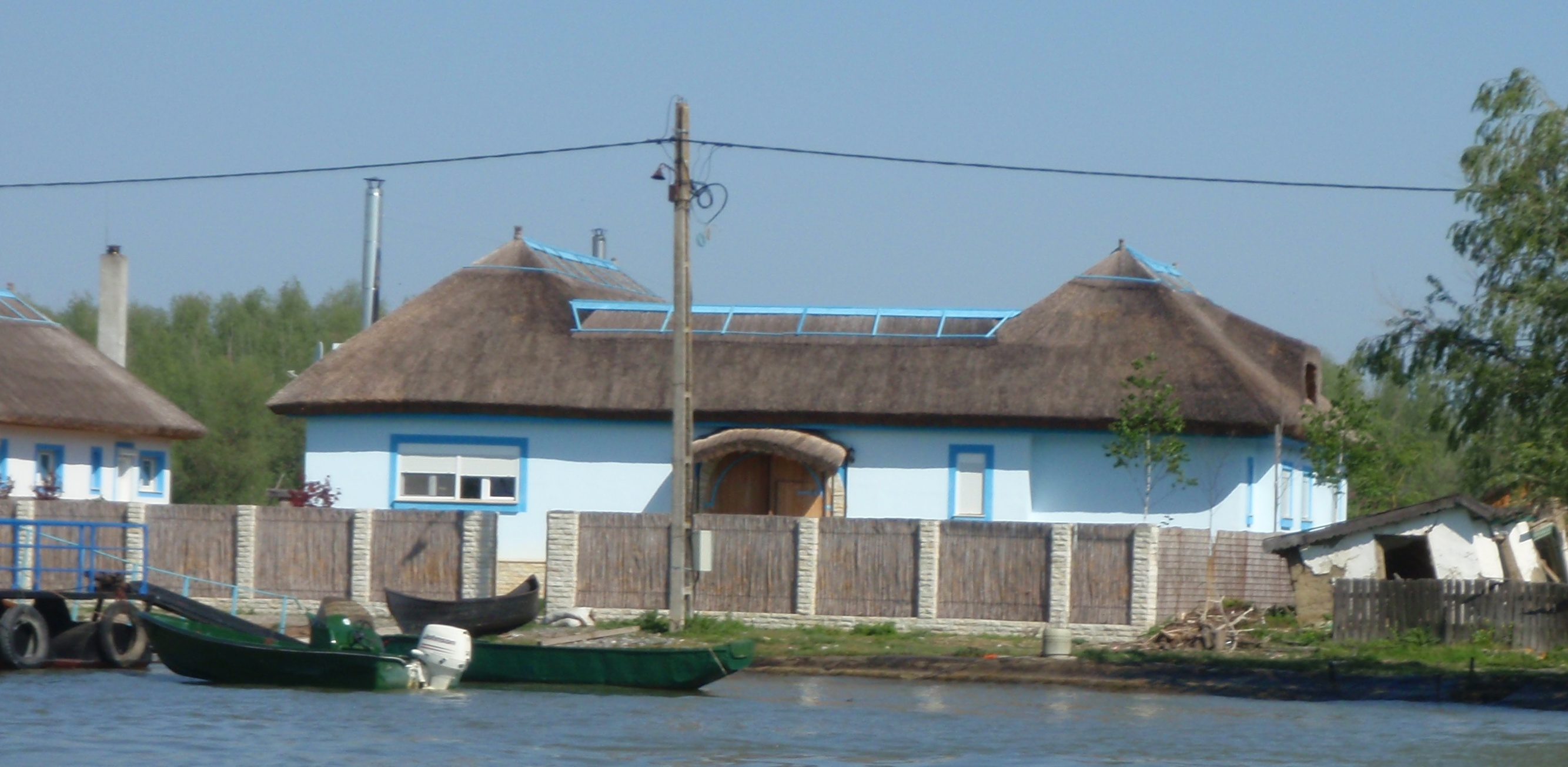
- Lipovan house in Partizani

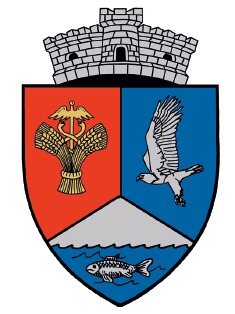
- Coat of arms

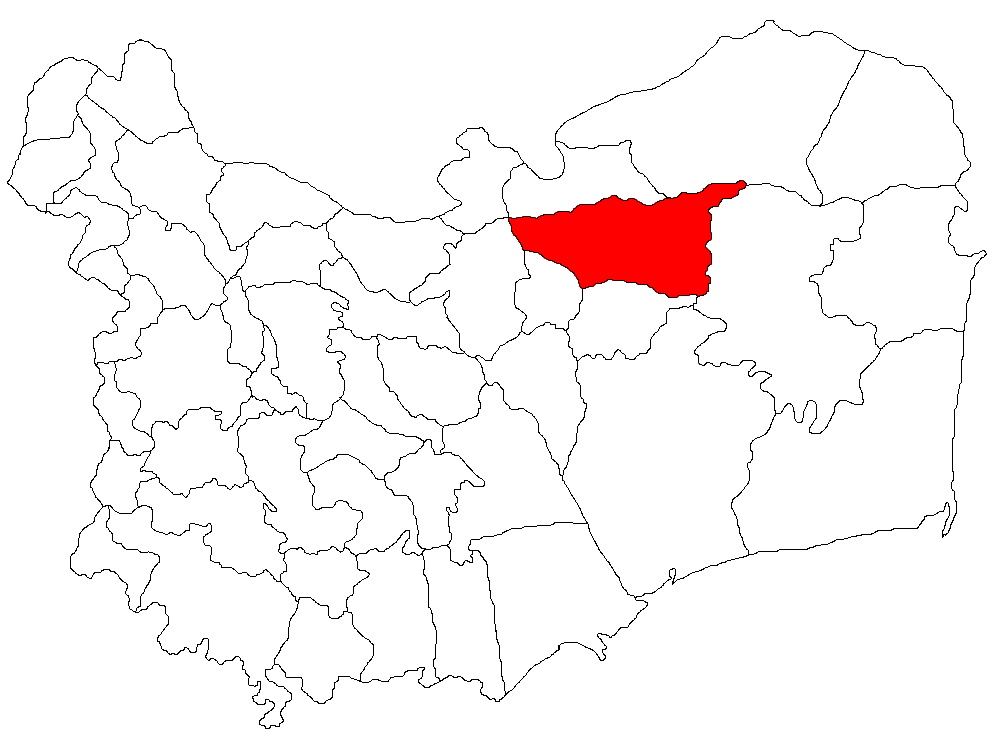
- Location in Tulcea County

- Location in Romania
- Coordinates: 45°10′N 29°5′E
- Country: Romania
- County: Tulcea
- Subdivisions: Gorgova, Ilganii de Sus, Maliuc, Partizani, Vulturu

Government
  - Mayor (2020–2024): Nicoleta Sevastian (PNL)
- Area: 257.76 km^{2} (99.52 sq mi)
- Elevation: 2 m (6.6 ft)
- Population (2021-12-01): 813
  - Density: 3.15/km^{2} (8.17/sq mi)
- Time zone: UTC+02:00 (EET)
  - Summer (DST): UTC+03:00 (EEST)
- Postal code: 827135
- Area code: +40 x40
- Vehicle reg.: TL
- Website: www.comuna-maliuc.ro

Maliuc is a commune in Tulcea County, Northern Dobruja, Romania. It is composed of four villages: Gorgova, Ilganii de Sus, Maliuc, Partizani, and Vulturu.

The commune lies on the Sulina branch of the river Danube, in the western third of the Danube Delta. It is located about 25 km (16 mi) east of the county seat, Tulcea.

== Demographics ==
According to the 2021 census, Maliuc had 813 inhabitants; of those, 90.77% were Romanians and 1.11% Russians. At the 2011 census, the commune had a population of 856; the majority of the inhabitants were Romanians (91.94%), with a minority of Russians (1.99%), and for 4.91% the ethnic affiliation was unknown. From a religious point of view, the majority of the inhabitants were Orthodox (85.33%), with a minority of Roman Catholics (4.34%), and for 8.49% the denominational affiliation was unknown.

Ethnic composition of Maliuc
1. Romanians (90.8%)
2. Russian Lipovans (1.11%)
3. Other (0.62%)
4. Unknown (7.50%)
Religious composition of Maliuc
1. Orthodox (87.3%)
2. Roman-Catholics (2.34%)
3. Other (1.85%)
4. Unknown (8.49%)

Historical population
Year	Pop.	±%
2002	1,060	—
2011	856	−19.2%
2021	813	−5.0%
Source: Census data

== Politics ==
The commune of Maliuc is administered by a mayor and a local council composed of 9 councilors. The mayor, Nicoleta Sevastian, a member of the National Liberal Party, has been in office since October 2020.

== Climate ==
Maliuc has a cold semi-arid climate (BSk) according to the Köppen climate classification.

Climate data for Gorgova (altitude 1m, 2014–2026 normals, sun 2001–2010, extremes 1981–present)
Month	Jan	Feb	Mar	Apr	May	Jun	Jul	Aug	Sep	Oct	Nov	Dec	Year
Record high °C (°F)	17.9 (64.2)	22.8 (73.0)	26.9 (80.4)	30.1 (86.2)	33.6 (92.5)	37.0 (98.6)	37.7 (99.9)	38.6 (101.5)	33.6 (92.5)	33.1 (91.6)	25.4 (77.7)	19.4 (66.9)	38.6 (101.5)
Mean daily maximum °C (°F)	5.2 (41.4)	7.4 (45.3)	11.8 (53.2)	17.2 (63.0)	22.6 (72.7)	27.5 (81.5)	30.3 (86.5)	30.4 (86.7)	25.2 (77.4)	18.3 (64.9)	11.9 (53.4)	7.2 (45.0)	17.9 (64.2)
Daily mean °C (°F)	1.6 (34.9)	3.7 (38.7)	7.4 (45.3)	12.2 (54.0)	17.2 (63.0)	22.1 (71.8)	24.2 (75.6)	23.9 (75.0)	19.2 (66.6)	13.1 (55.6)	8.0 (46.4)	3.8 (38.8)	13.0 (55.5)
Mean daily minimum °C (°F)	−2.0 (28.4)	−0.1 (31.8)	3.0 (37.4)	7.2 (45.0)	11.9 (53.4)	16.8 (62.2)	18.2 (64.8)	17.5 (63.5)	13.1 (55.6)	8.0 (46.4)	4.1 (39.4)	0.4 (32.7)	8.2 (46.7)
Record low °C (°F)	−20.1 (−4.2)	−16.7 (1.9)	−13.2 (8.2)	−2.0 (28.4)	3.4 (38.1)	8.0 (46.4)	9.8 (49.6)	6.9 (44.4)	0.8 (33.4)	−5.3 (22.5)	−10.5 (13.1)	−16.1 (3.0)	−20.1 (−4.2)
Average precipitation mm (inches)	34.8 (1.37)	28.5 (1.12)	27.1 (1.07)	34.7 (1.37)	43.2 (1.70)	45.4 (1.79)	33.9 (1.33)	21.4 (0.84)	24.6 (0.97)	42.3 (1.67)	52.1 (2.05)	32.9 (1.30)	420.9 (16.58)
Average precipitation days (≥ 1.0 mm)	6.0	4.6	4.8	5.3	5.6	4.5	4.2	2.5	2.8	5.2	6.2	6.2	57.9
Mean monthly sunshine hours	91.0	119.0	175.4	232.8	304.4	321.1	375.8	330.7	223.3	172.2	111.2	83.3	2,540.2
Source 1: Meteomanz (2014-2026); Infoclimat (1980-2017)
Source 2: Bioclima Deltei Dunării
