= Valea Teilor =

- Commune
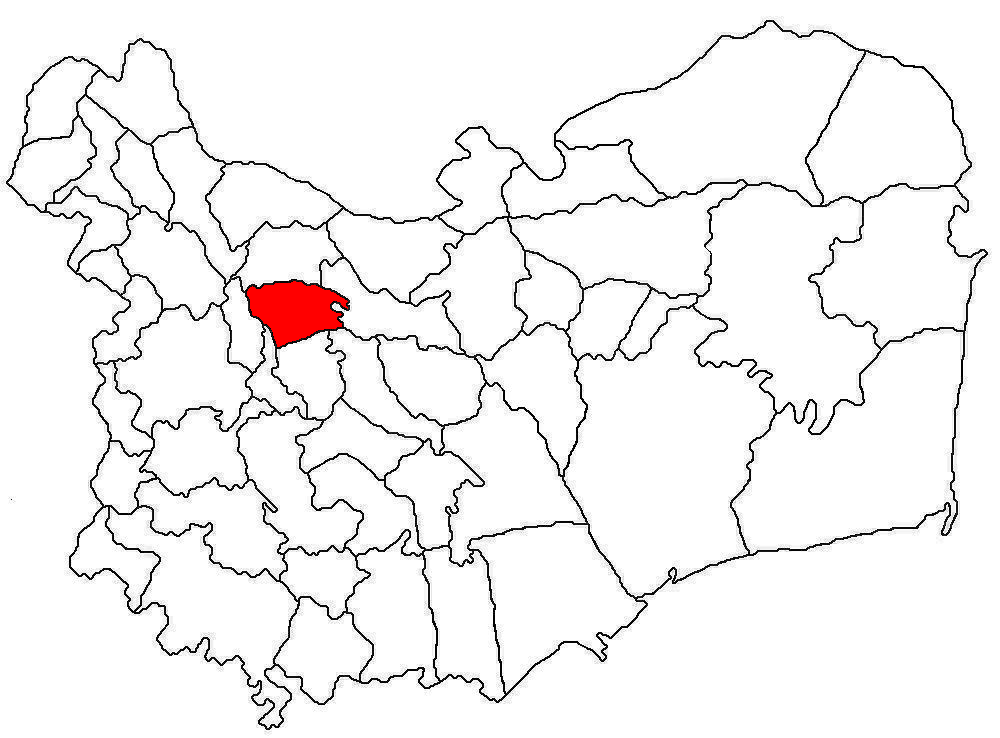
- Location in Tulcea County

- Location in Romania
- Coordinates: 45°06′N 28°29′E
- Country: Romania
- County: Tulcea

Government
  - Mayor (2020–2024): Violeta Andrei (PNL)
- Area: 15.27 km^{2} (5.90 sq mi)
- Elevation: 159 m (522 ft)
- Population (2021-12-01): 1,289
  - Density: 84.41/km^{2} (218.6/sq mi)
- Time zone: UTC+02:00 (EET)
  - Summer (DST): UTC+03:00 (EEST)
- Postal code: 827108
- Area code: +40 x40
- Vehicle reg.: TL
- Website: www.primaria-valea-teilor.ro

Valea Teilor (formerly Meidanchioi) is a commune in Tulcea County, Northern Dobruja, Romania. It is composed of a single village, Valea Teilor.

Historical population
Year	Pop.	±%
2002	1,567	—
2011	1,447	−7.7%
2021	1,289	−10.9%
Source: Census data
