= Pardina, Tulcea =

Pardina
- Commune
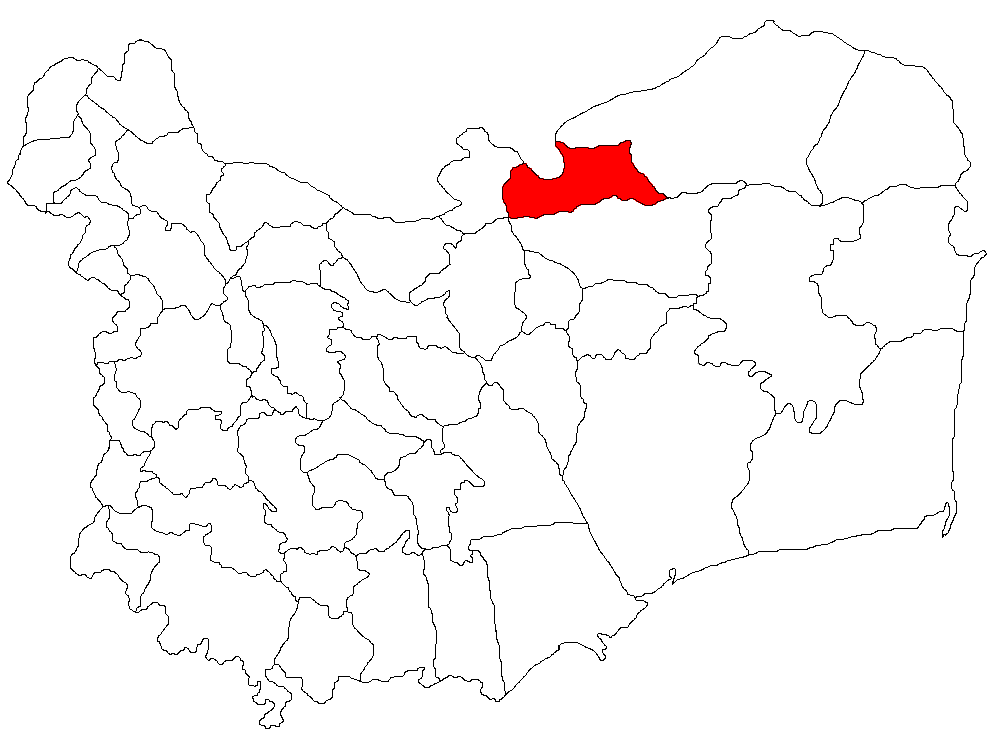
- Location in Tulcea County

- Location in Romania
- Coordinates: 45°18′N 28°58′E
- Country: Romania
- County: Tulcea

Government
  - Mayor (2020–2024): Dumitru Pocora (PSD)
- Area: 311.41 km^{2} (120.24 sq mi)
- Population (2021-12-01): 489
  - Density: 1.6/km^{2} (4.1/sq mi)
- Time zone: EET/EEST (UTC+2/+3)
- Postal code: 827180
- Vehicle reg.: TL
- Website: www.primariapardina.ro

Pardina (1 Mai from 1983 to 1996) is a commune in Tulcea County, Northern Dobruja, Romania. It is composed of a single village, Pardina.
