= Dorobanțu, Tulcea =

Dorobanțu
- Commune
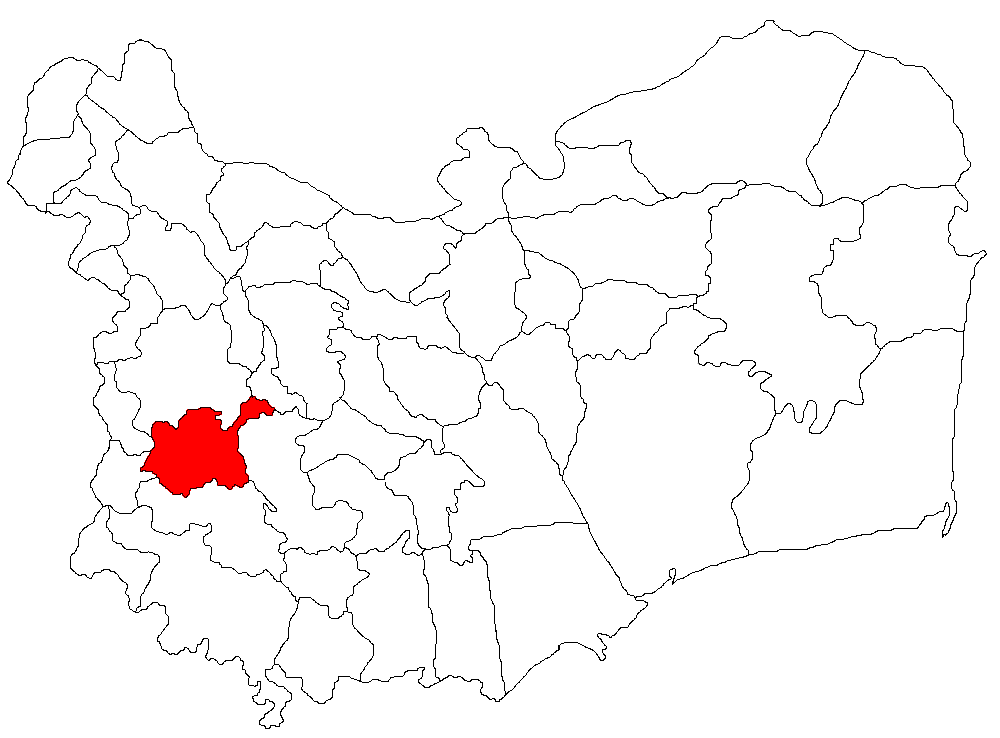
- Location in Tulcea County

- Location in Romania
- Coordinates: 44°57′N 28°16′E
- Country: Romania
- County: Tulcea
- Subdivisions: Ardealu, Cârjelari, Dorobanțu, Fântâna Oilor, Meșteru

Government
  - Mayor (2020–2024): Valentin Munteanu (PSD)
- Area: 118.79 km^{2} (45.87 sq mi)
- Population (2021-12-01): 1,202
  - Density: 10/km^{2} (26/sq mi)
- Time zone: EET/EEST (UTC+2/+3)
- Vehicle reg.: TL
- Website: primariadorobantu.paginadestart.com

Dorobanțu is a commune in Tulcea County, Northern Dobruja, Romania. It is composed of five villages: Ardealu (depopulated as of 2002, historical name: Asînlar), Cârjelari, Dorobanțu, Fântâna Oilor (historical name: Coiumbunar or Coiumpunar) and Meșteru (historical name:Canat Calfa).
