= Topolog, Tulcea =

Topolog
- Commune
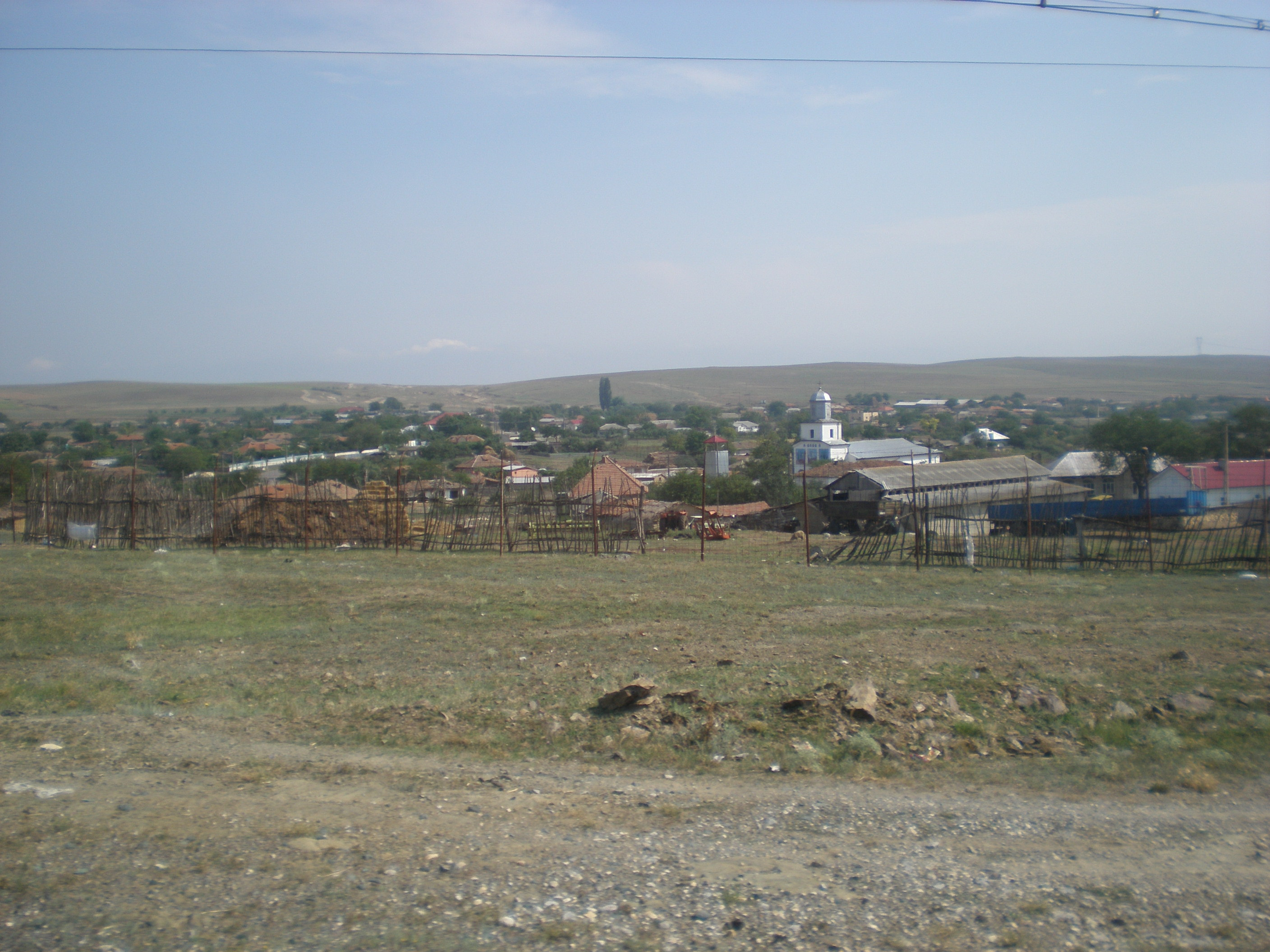
- Sâmbăta Nouă

- Coat of arms

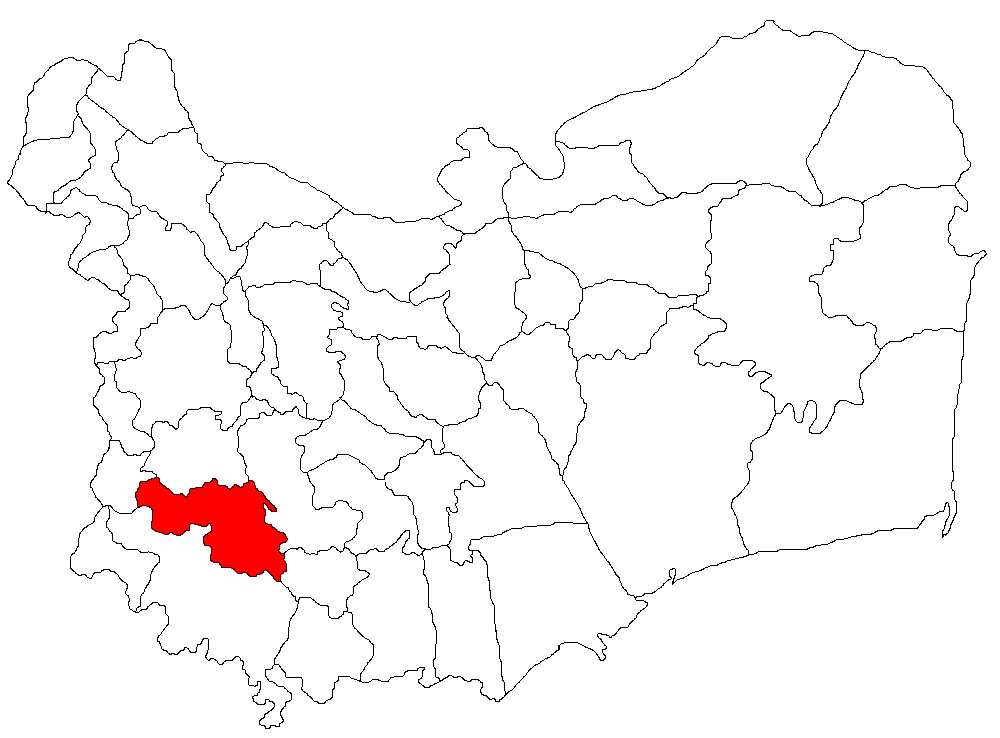
- Location in Tulcea County

- Location in Romania
- Coordinates: 44°53′N 28°22′E
- Country: Romania
- County: Tulcea
- Subdivisions: Calfa, Cerbu, Făgărașu Nou, Luminița, Măgurele, Sâmbăta Nouă, Topolog

Government
  - Mayor (2020–2024): Marian Ciobanu
- Area: 198.29 km^{2} (76.56 sq mi)
- Elevation: 221 m (725 ft)
- Population (2021-12-01): 3,958
  - Density: 19.96/km^{2} (51.70/sq mi)
- Time zone: UTC+02:00 (EET)
  - Summer (DST): UTC+03:00 (EEST)
- Postal code: 827220
- Area code: +40 x40
- Vehicle reg.: TL
- Website: primaria-topolog.ro

Topolog is a commune in Tulcea County, Northern Dobruja, Romania. It is composed of seven villages: Calfa, Cerbu (historical name:Hagiomer), Făgărașu Nou, Luminița (historical names: Rum Ali, Urumbei – until 1925, Regina Elisabeta – until 1948, Elena Pavel – until 1964), Măgurele, Sâmbăta Nouă, and Topolog.

Făgărașu Nou ("New Făgăraș") was founded around 1880 by Mihai Popa Radu, a former captain in the Austro-Hungarian Army. Naming the new village after his hometown, he brought along seventeen families from Transylvania, part of a broader migration of Mocani.

Historical population
Year	Pop.	±%
2002	5,039	—
2011	4,698	−6.8%
2021	3,958	−15.8%
Source: Census data

== Link ==
- https://primaria-topolog.ro/
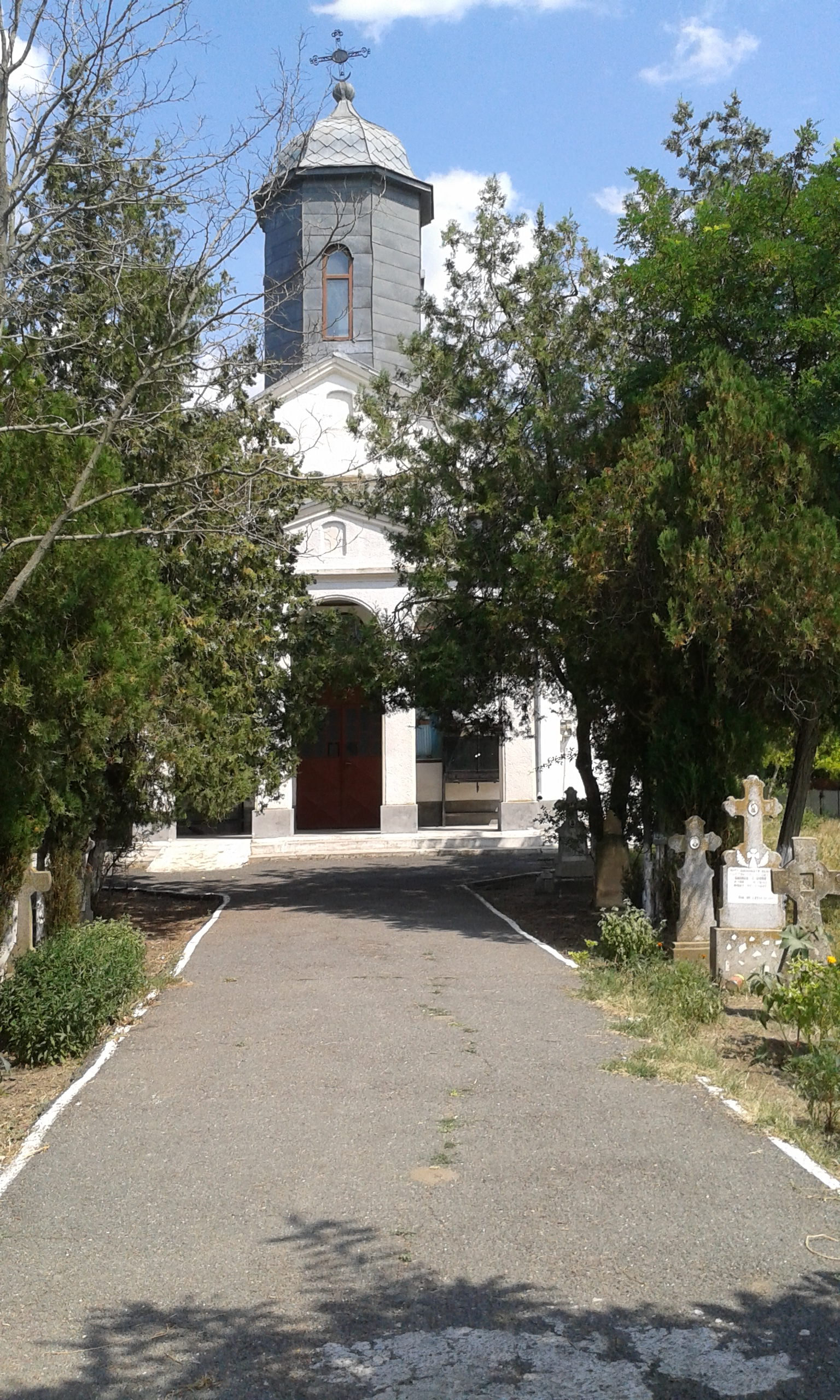
Church in Făgărașu Nou
