= Carcaliu =

- Commune
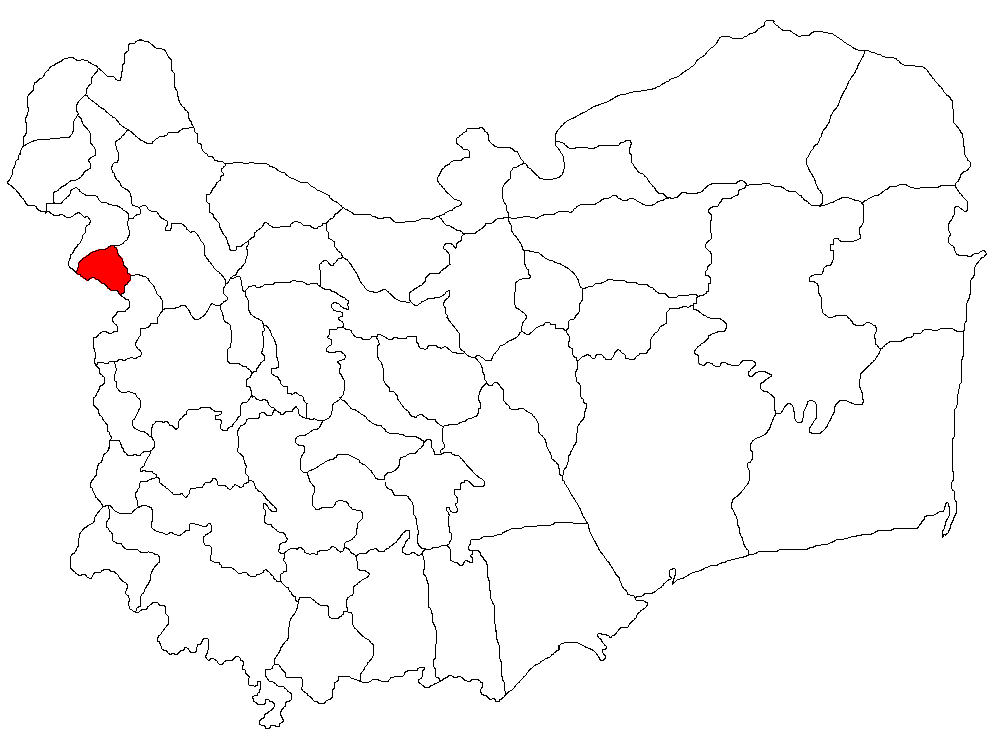
- Location in Tulcea County

- Location in Romania
- Coordinates: 45°11′N 28°09′E
- Country: Romania
- County: Tulcea

Government
  - Mayor (2020–2024): Gheorghe Panfil (PSD)
- Area: 29.48 km^{2} (11.38 sq mi)
- Population (2021-12-01): 2,136
  - Density: 72.46/km^{2} (187.7/sq mi)
- Time zone: UTC+02:00 (EET)
  - Summer (DST): UTC+03:00 (EEST)
- Postal code: 827020
- Vehicle reg.: TL
- Website: Official website

Carcaliu (Romanian pronunciation: [karkaˈli.u]) is a commune in Tulcea County, Northern Dobruja, Romania. It is composed of a single village, Carcaliu. At the 2011 census, 91% of inhabitants were Lipovans and 8.9% Romanians.
