= Sulina branch =

One of three distributaries of the Danube River

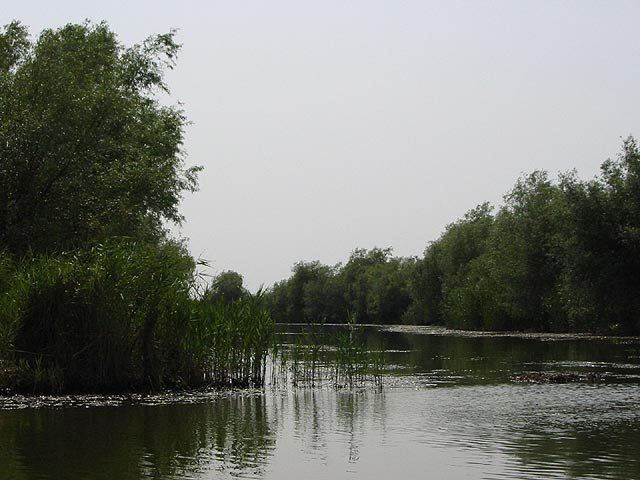
- Sulina branch

Physical characteristics
- Mouth
  - location: Danube Delta
  - coordinates: 45°09′28″N 29°39′13″E
- Length: 71.75 km (44.58 mi)

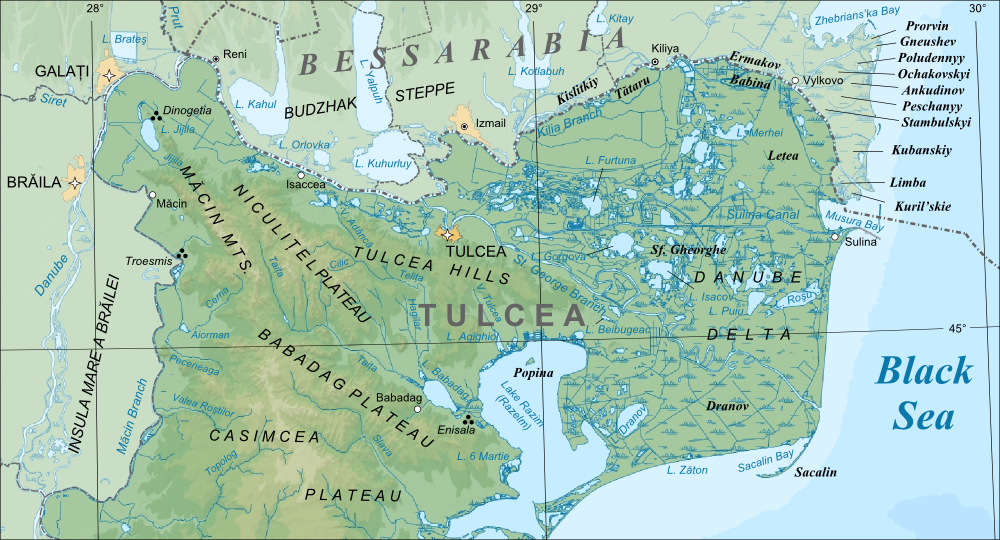
Danube Delta full map with its distributaries identified

The Sulina branch is a distributary of the river Danube that contributes to forming the Danube Delta.

The other two main branches of the Danube are the Chilia branch to the north and the Sfântu Gheorghe branch to the south. The Sulina branch starts at a bifurcation of the Tulcea distributary, at Sfântu Gheorghe, Tulcea, runs east for 71.7 km (44.6 mi), and reaches the Black Sea at the port of Sulina. Its outflow comprises about 20% of the Danube's discharge.

== Early history ==
Until 1857, the Sulina Branch was in its initial state. Its path was 83 kilometres (52 mi) long, and sinuous, its width varying between 120 metres (390 ft) and 250 metres (820 ft), and the depth of its thalweg was between 2.5 metres (8.2 ft) and 9 metres (30 ft) below the local water level.

The Crimean War guaranteed its importance. From about 1850 to 1900, its importance for shipping grew as it stood at the confluence of European shipping routes. As the Sulina Branch was wide and shallow, between 1858 and 1872 jetties were built. They were lengthened, between 1925 and 1932, and again from 1944 to 1956 and 1956 to 1986. The jetties currently reach to 9,300 metres (30,500 ft) from the shore. The bar was deepened.

== The Rostock shipwreck ==
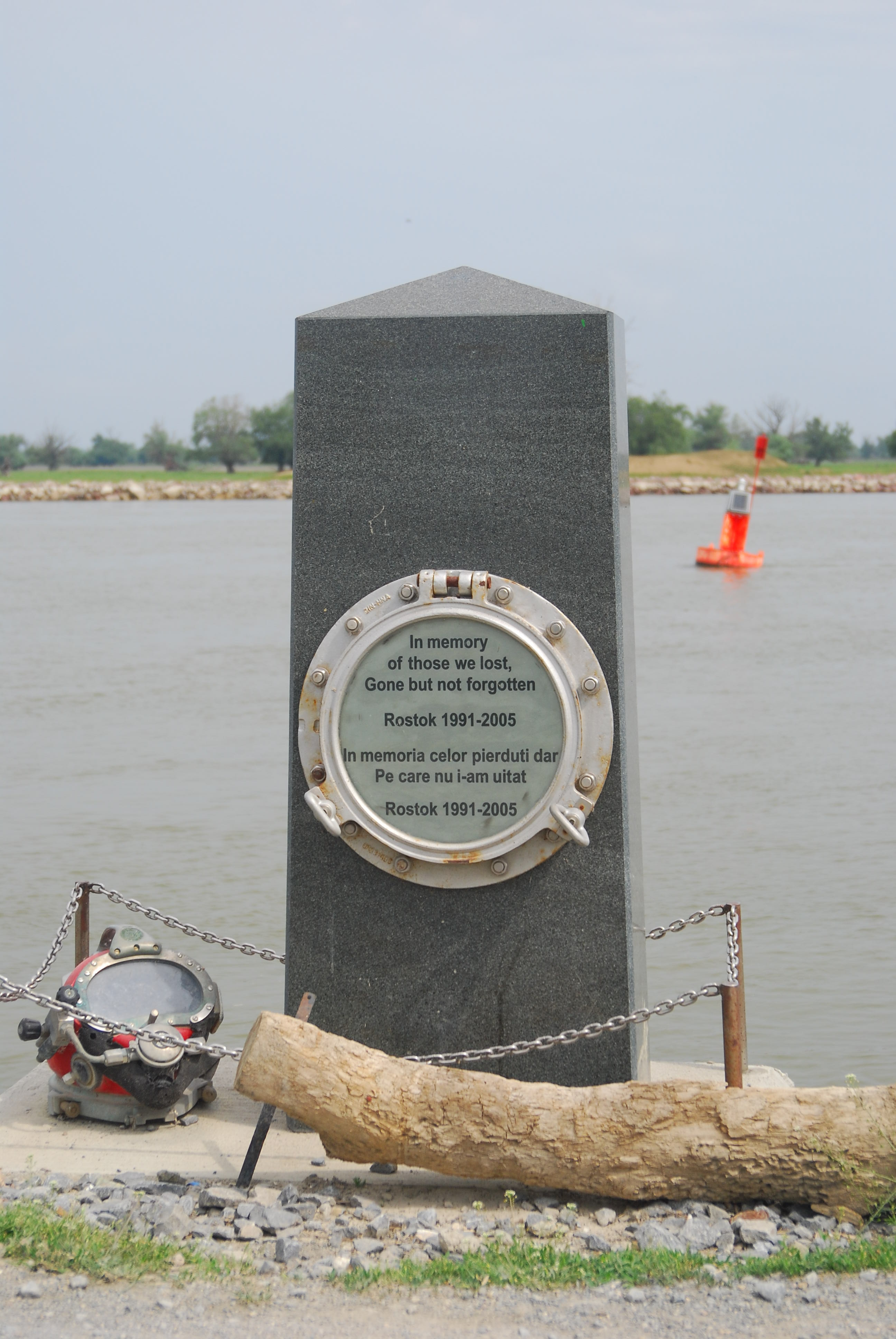
Rostock Memorial in Partizani village

In September 1991, the Ukrainian-flagged vessel Rostock ran aground and sank in the Sulina branch at Mila 31, near Partizani village, partially blocking traffic; the last piece of the wreck of the ship was finally brought to the surface in 2015. In the course of removing the wreck of the Rostock, three divers lost their lives, including John Whitekettle (from the United States) and Anthony James Eke (from England); a memorial dedicated to them was erected on the right bank of the Sulina branch, next to the shipwreck site.
