= Nalbant =

- Commune
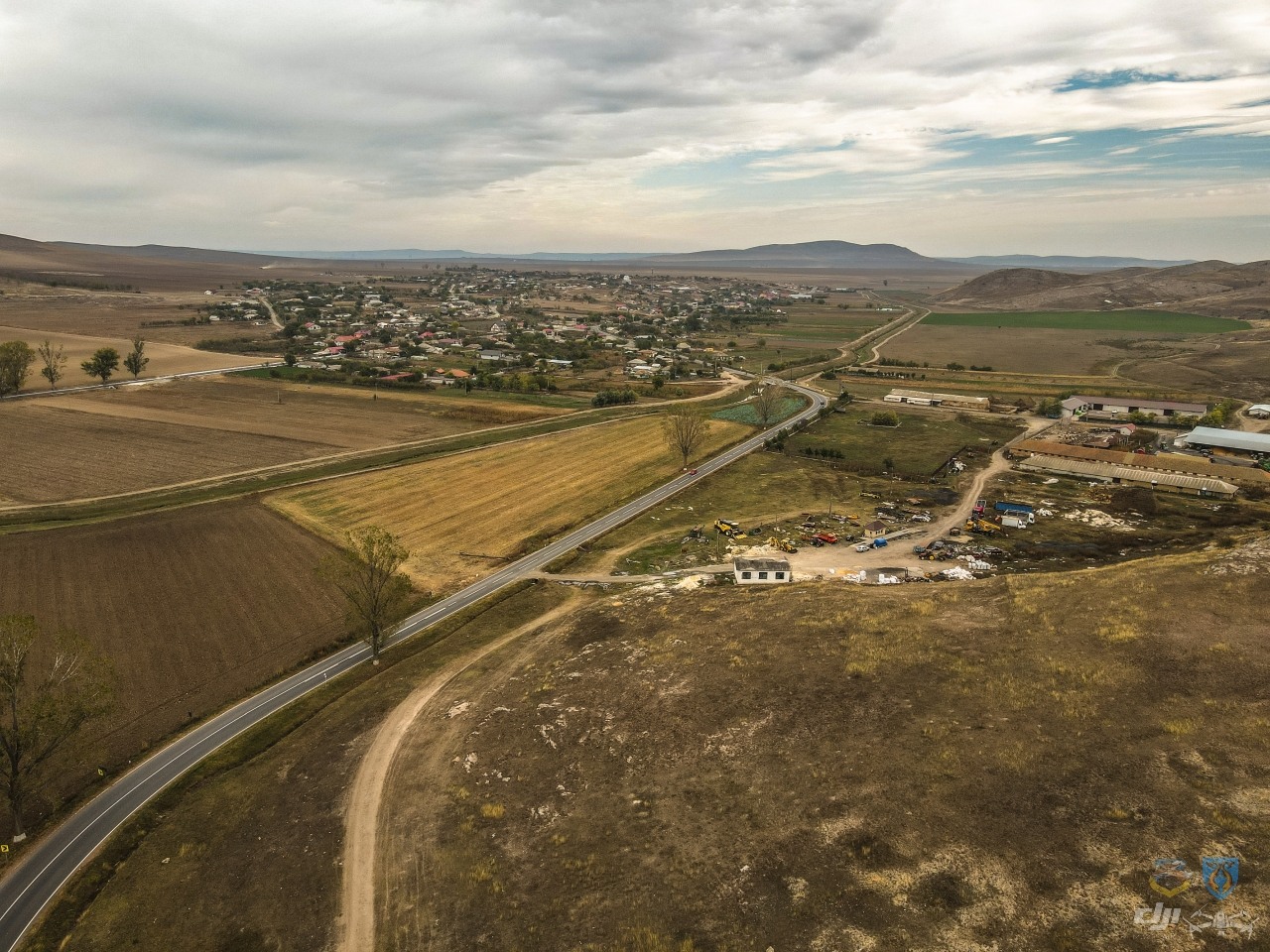
- Aerial view of Nicolae Bălcescu village

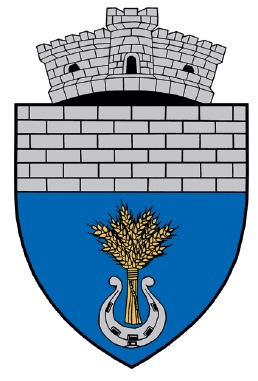
- Coat of arms

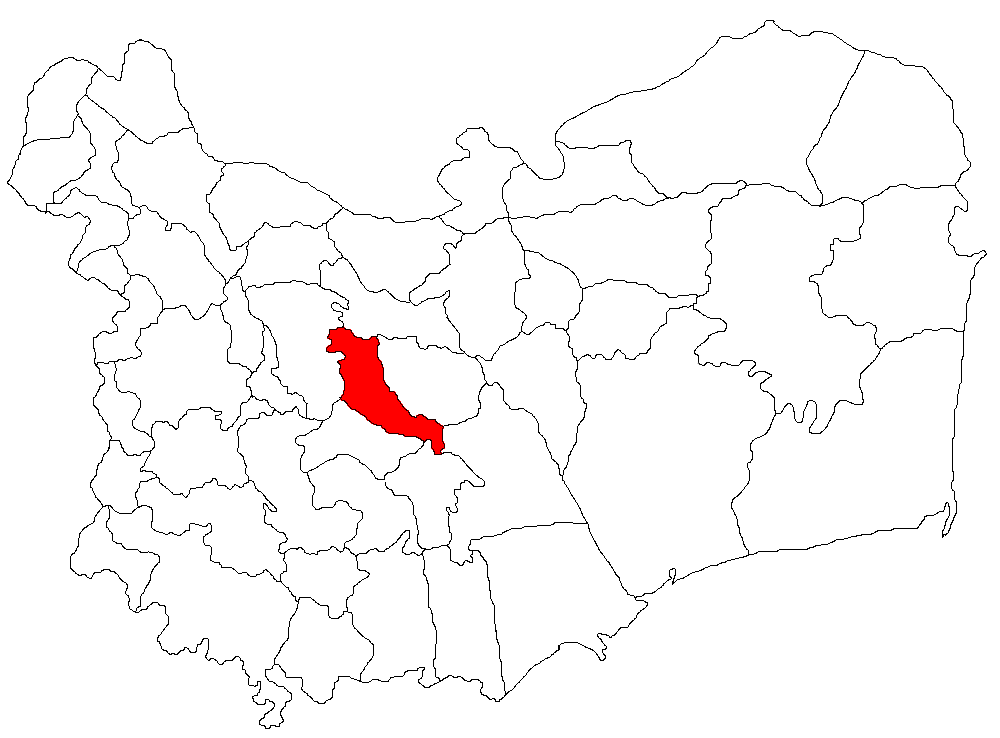
- Location in Tulcea County

- Location in Romania
- Coordinates: 45°03′N 28°37′E
- Country: Romania
- County: Tulcea
- Subdivisions: Nalbant, Nicolae Bălcescu, Trestenic

Government
  - Mayor (2020–2024): Ion Nicolae (PNL)
- Area: 119.43 km^{2} (46.11 sq mi)
- Elevation: 68 m (223 ft)
- Population (2021-12-01): 2,113
  - Density: 17.69/km^{2} (45.82/sq mi)
- Time zone: UTC+02:00 (EET)
  - Summer (DST): UTC+03:00 (EEST)
- Vehicle reg.: TL
- Website: nalbant.judetul-tulcea.ro

Nalbant is a commune in Tulcea County, Northern Dobruja, Romania. It is composed of three villages: Nalbant, Nicolae Bălcescu (since 1948; until 1923 Bașchioi; Principele Mihai from 1923 to 1948) and Trestenic.

The commune's name comes from Turkish, nalbant from Persian nal-band meaning blacksmith (nal – nail, horse shoe, band – to bond, to tie).

Nalbant is located in the central part of the county, 24 km (15 mi) southwest of the county seat, Tulcea. It is crossed by national roads DN22A, which runs from Tulcea to Hârșova, and DN22F, which connects Nalbant to Horia.
