= Horia, Tulcea =

Horia
- Commune
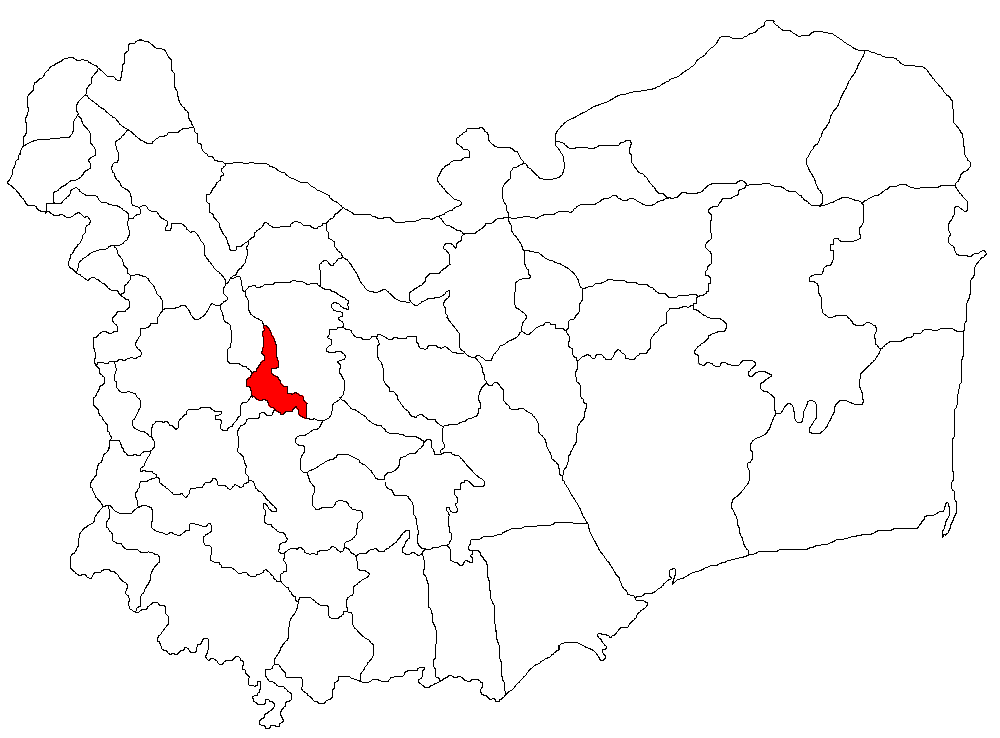
- Location in Tulcea County

- Location in Romania
- Coordinates: 45°01′N 28°27′E
- Country: Romania
- County: Tulcea
- Subdivisions: Cloșca, Florești, Horia

Government
  - Mayor (2020–2024): Marian Taifas (PSD)
- Area: 42.00 km^{2} (16.22 sq mi)
- Population (2021-12-01): 1,256
  - Density: 30/km^{2} (77/sq mi)
- Time zone: EET/EEST (UTC+2/+3)
- Vehicle reg.: TL
- Website: www.primariahoria.ro

Horia is a commune in Tulcea County, Northern Dobruja, Romania. It is composed of three villages: Cloșca (formerly called Dautcea and, after 1912, Încoronarea), Florești (formerly called Islam Geaferca) and Horia (formerly called Ortachioi, and Regina Maria from 1924 to 1947).

== History ==
The village Horia was first mentioned on the maps of the 18th century, as a small community with a few villages. In the 19th century it had the Turkish name Ortachioi, and at the beginning of the 20th century, the village received the name "Regina Maria" (after Queen Marie of Romania). From 1947 to the present days, the village bears the name Horia.

== Ethnic structure ==
Horia was grounded by a Muslim community, to which added in time Romanians and Bulgarians. Nowadays it comprises mostly Romanian population.

== Cultural personalities of the village ==
- Gheorghe C. Mihalcea, PhD in philology, folklorist and teacher at the school in Horia.
