= Mihai Bravu, Tulcea =

Mihai Bravu
- Commune
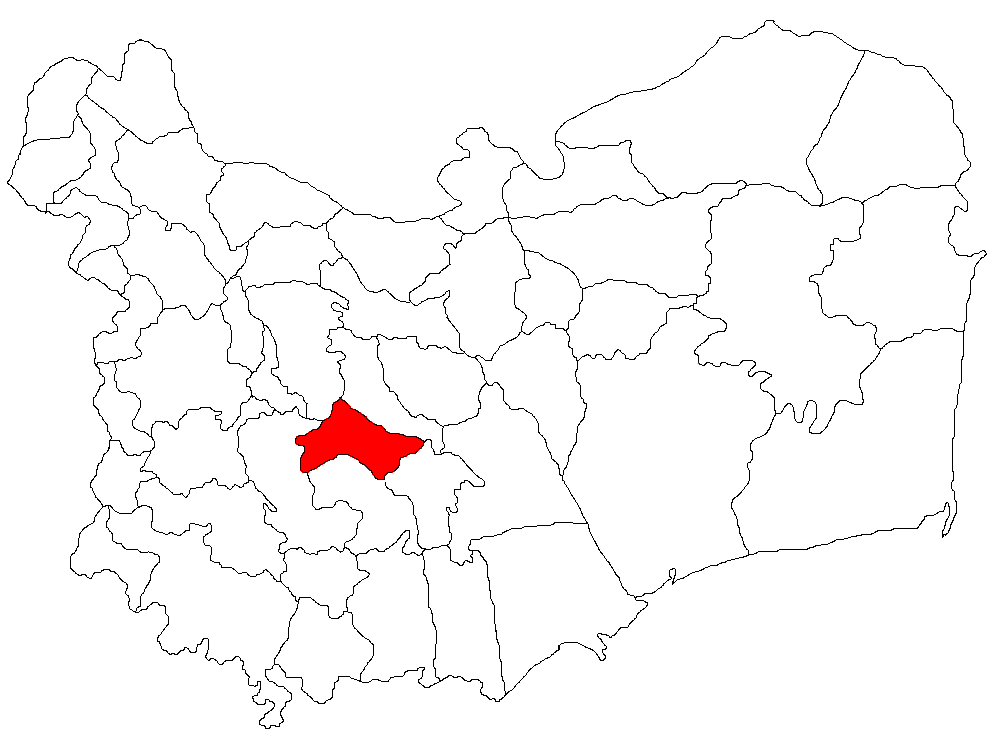
- Location in Tulcea County

- Location in Romania
- Coordinates: 44°57′N 28°39′E
- Country: Romania
- County: Tulcea
- Subdivisions: Mihai Bravu, Satu Nou, Turda

Government
  - Mayor (2020–2024): Tănase Răducan (PSD)
- Area: 73.47 km^{2} (28.37 sq mi)
- Population (2021-12-01): 2,245
  - Density: 30.56/km^{2} (79.14/sq mi)
- Time zone: UTC+02:00 (EET)
  - Summer (DST): UTC+03:00 (EEST)
- Vehicle reg.: TL
- Website: www.primaria-mihaibravu.ro

Mihai Bravu is a commune in Tulcea County, Northern Dobruja, Romania. It is composed of three villages: Mihai Bravu (formerly Camber), Satu Nou and Turda (formerly Armutlia).
