= Chilia branch =

Branch of the Danube River; part of the Ukraine-Romania border

Coordinates: 45°13′44″N 28°44′10″E

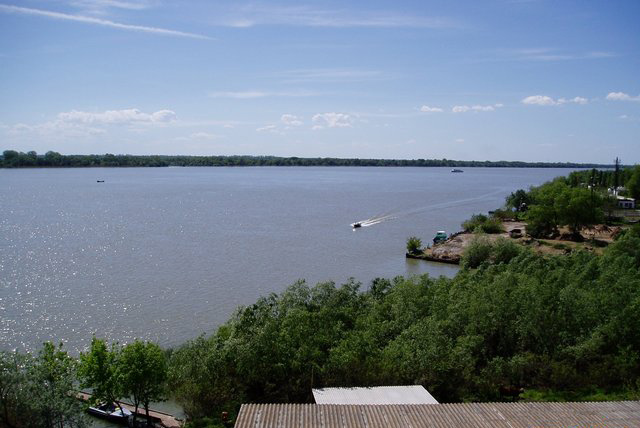
- Etymology: twin cities of Kiliia (Ukraine) and Chilia Veche (Romania)
- Native name: Brațul Chilia (Romanian); Кілійське гирло (Ukrainian)

Location
- Countries: Romania, Ukraine

Physical characteristics
- Source: Danube
- Mouth: Black Sea
- Length: 117 kilometres (73 mi)

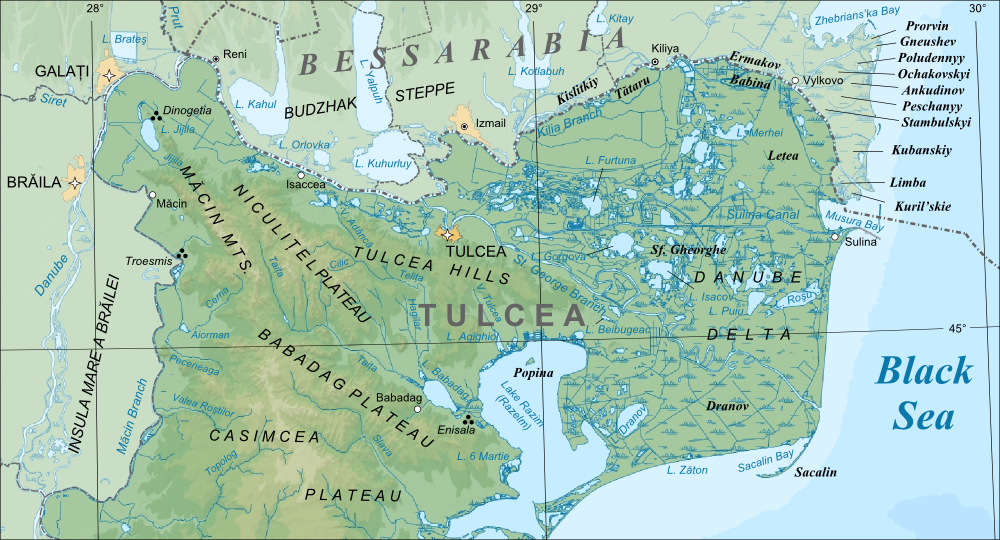
Danube Delta full map with its distributaries identified

The Chilia branch (Romanian: Brațul Chilia; Ukrainian: Кілійське гирло, romanized: Kiliiske hyrlo) is one of three main distributary channels of the river Danube that contribute to forming the Danube Delta. Lying at the northernmost area of the delta, the distributary creates a natural border between Romania and Ukraine (see Romania-Ukraine border) and is named after the two towns carrying the same name, located across from one another on both banks: Kiliia, on the northern, Ukrainian bank and Chilia Veche (Old Chilia) on the southern, Romanian bank.

The other two main branches of the Danube are the Sulina branch and the Sfântu Gheorghe branch.

== Geography ==
The Chilia branch begins at the start of the Danube Delta, where Danube splits into the Chilia and Tulcea distributaries. It carries approximately half of the Danube's discharge. It ends near the town of Vylkove where Chilia branch splits further into Ochakove distributary (eastward) and Old Stambul distributary (southward). The flow at the entrance into the delta is of 6,350 m^{3}/s.

== History ==
The Chilia branch is the youngest distributary of the Danube, dating back around 2000 years. It originally drained into a lagoon, called the Thiagola, until sometime after 1000 CE, when the lagoon filled and the river drained directly into the Black Sea. By the late 14th century, the Chilia branch had become the primary navigation route for getting across the Danube Delta, and Genoese traders had set up a major trading post along this branch. It remains a major route for Danube-bound cargo ships in modern times, especially for Ukrainian shipping, since the ports on the Black Sea have been targets in the Russian invasion of Ukraine.

Along the Chilia branch is located the former Ottoman fortress in today's Ukrainian city of Izmail. The fall of Izmail in 1789 led the Ottomans' loss of complete control over the northern Pontic shores (today southern Ukraine) and to the expansion the Russian Empire to this part of the Black Sea, with the continuation of struggles and warring between the Ottoman and Russian Empires.
