= Sfântu Gheorghe branch =

Coordinates: 44°52′48″N 29°37′00″E

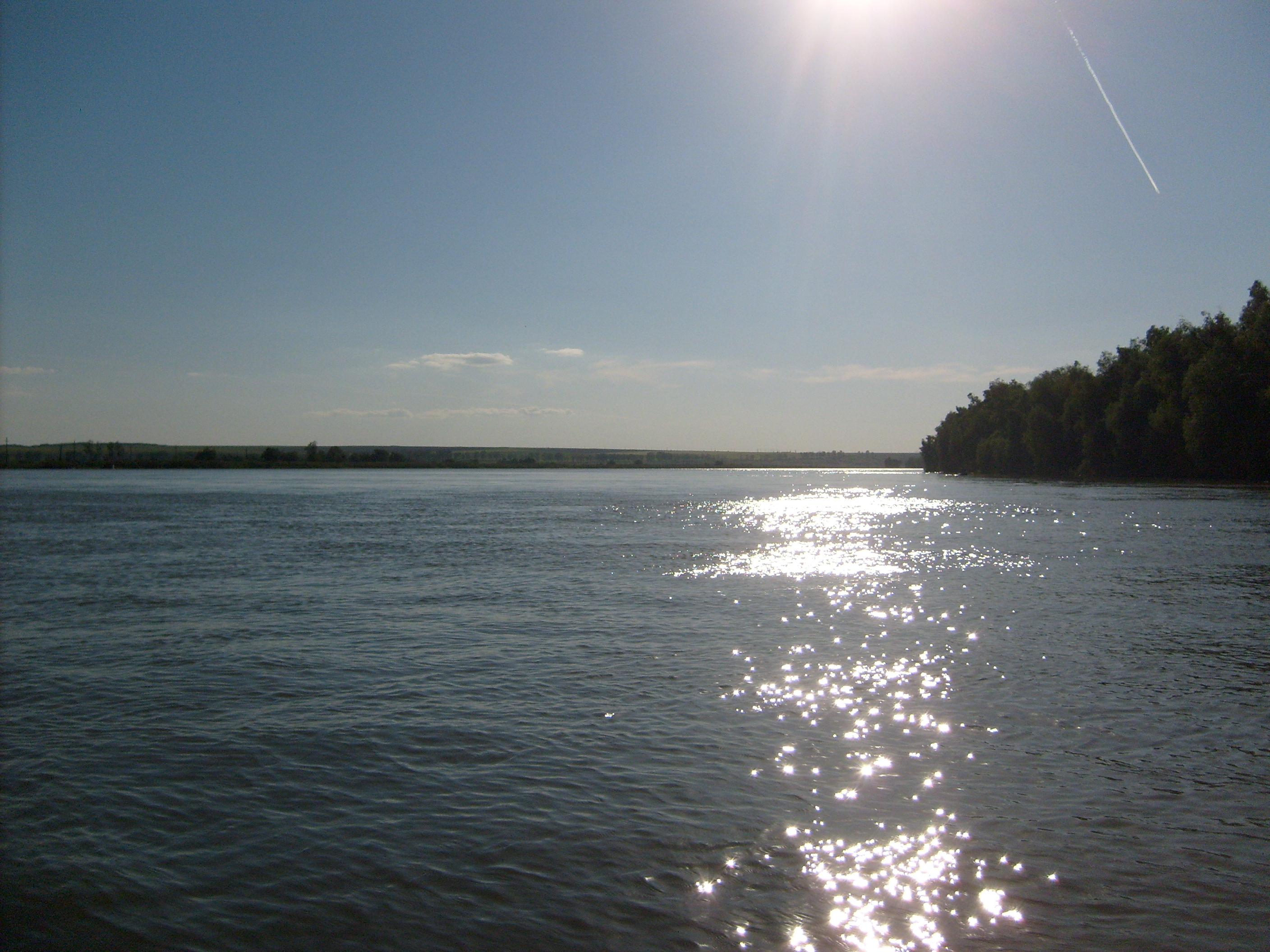

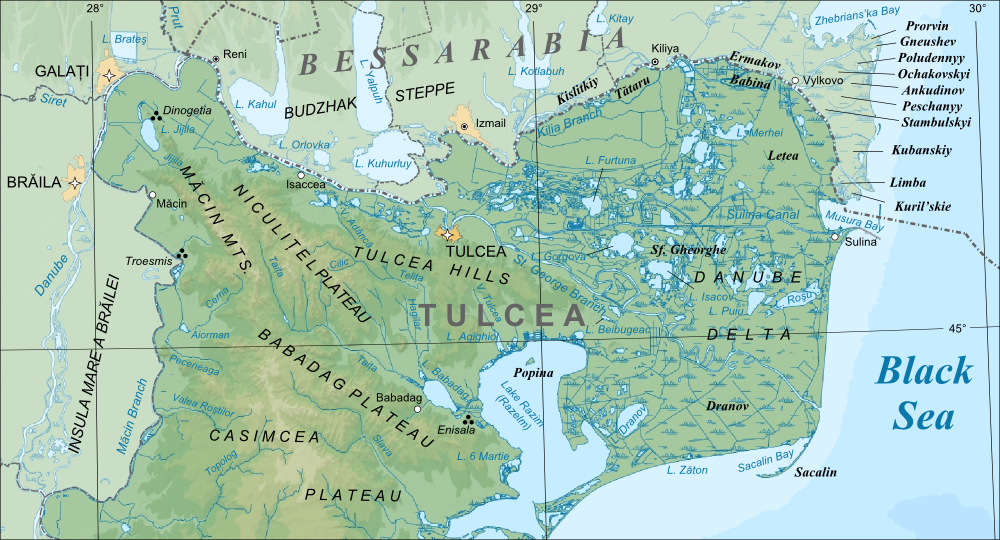
Danube Delta full map with its distributaries identified

The Sfântu Gheorghe branch (Romanian: Brațul Sfântu Gheorghe; Ukrainian: Георгіївське гирло, romanised: Heorhiivske hyrlo) is a distributary of the river Danube, that contributes in forming the Danube Delta.

This is the southernmost branch of the Danube; the other two main branches are the Chilia branch and the Sulina branch. The Sfântu Gheorghe branch runs on a length of 64 kilometres (40 mi), in a southeasterly direction. Its outflow comprises about 22% of the Danube's discharge.

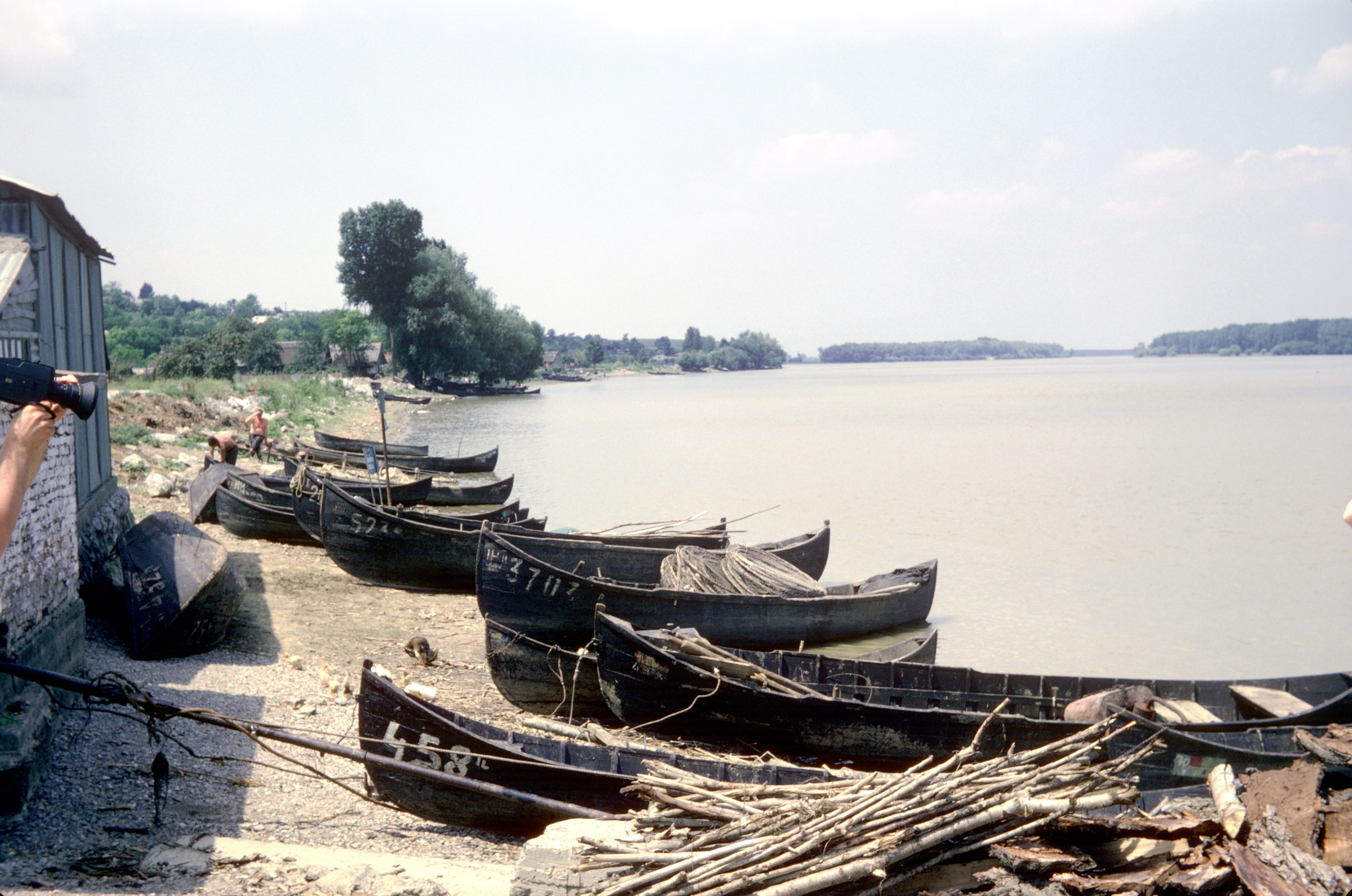
Fishing boats between Nufăru and Mahmudia
