= Slava (river) =

- Location within Romania

Location
- Country: Romania
- Counties: Tulcea County
- Villages: Fântâna Mare, Slava Rusă, Ceamurlia de Jos

Physical characteristics
- Mouth: Lake Golovița
  - coordinates: 44.7194°N 28.7856°E
- Length: 38 km (24 mi)
- Basin size: 356 km^{2} (137 sq mi)

Basin features
- Tributaries
  - left: Ciucurova
  - right: Camena

The Slava is a river in Tulcea County, Romania. Near Lunca it discharges into Lake Golovița, a former lagoon of the Black Sea. Its length is 38 km (24 mi) and its basin size is 356 km^{2} (137 sq mi).
