= Hamangia (river) =

- Location within Romania

Location
- Country: Romania
- Counties: Tulcea County
- Villages: Vasile Alecsandri, Beidaud, Baia

Physical characteristics
- Mouth: Lake Golovița
  - coordinates: 44.6947°N 28.7732°E
- Length: 33 km (21 mi)
- Basin size: 224 km^{2} (86 sq mi)

The Hamangia is a river in Tulcea County, Romania. Near Lunca, it discharges into Lake Golovița, a former lagoon of the Black Sea. Its length is 33 km (21 mi) and its basin size is 224 km^{2} (86 sq mi).
