= Babadag Training Area =

Military training area in Romania

- Centrul Secundar de Instruire pentru Luptă Babadag
- Babadag, Tulcea County in Romania
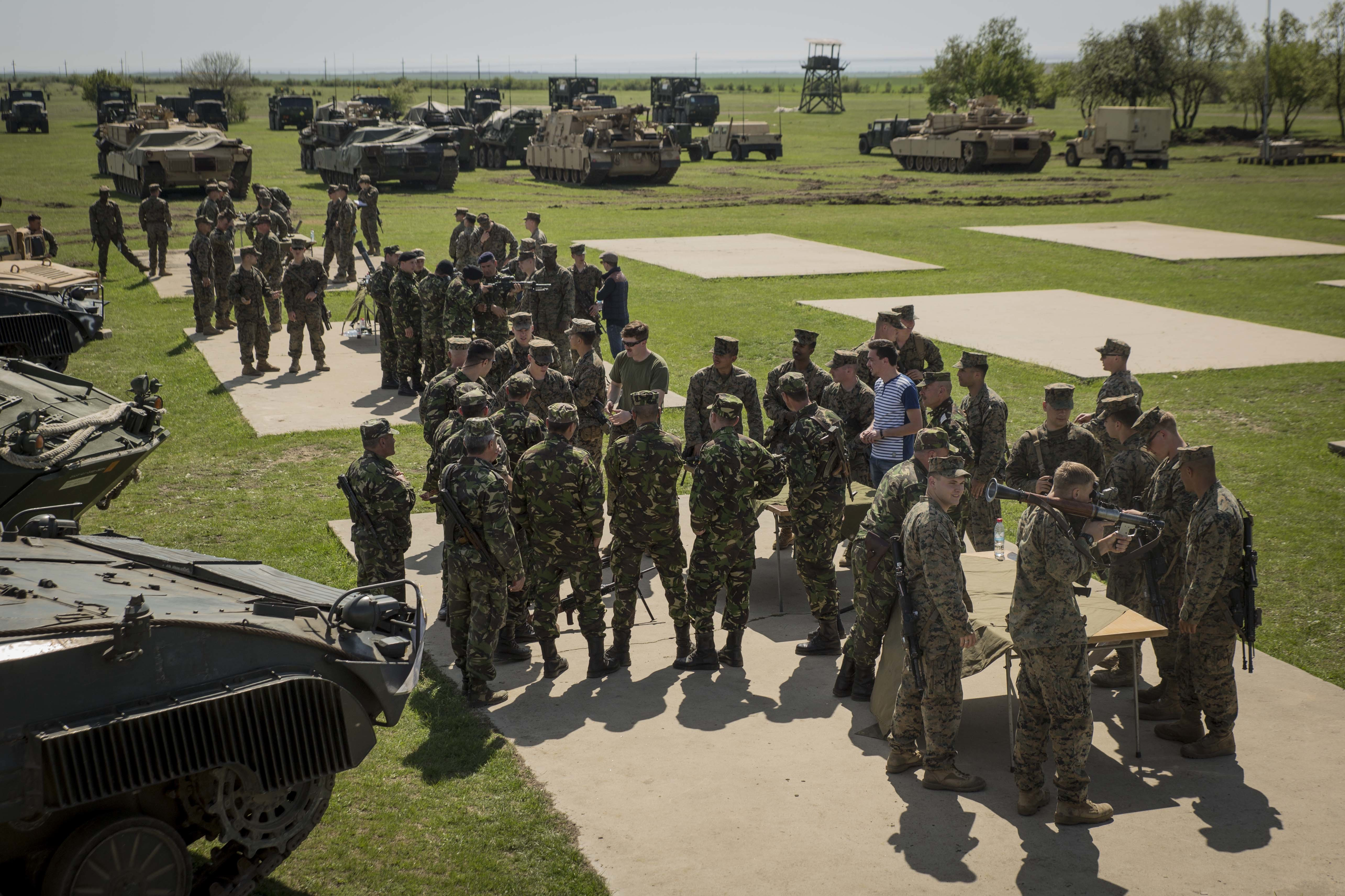
- Black Sea Rotational Force Marines and Romanian soldiers at the Babadag Training Area in 2016

Site information
- Controlled by: Romanian Land Forces; NATO

Location
- Coordinates: 44°51′1.0″N 28°52′30.4″E
- Area: 2,700 ha (27 km^{2}; 10 sq mi)

The Babadag Training Area, officially the Babadag Secondary Combat Training Center (Romanian: Centrul Secundar de Instruire pentru Luptă Babadag) is a military training area north of Jurilovca, Tulcea County, Romania, southeast by east of Babadag, operated by the Romanian Land Forces. The area opens to the Lake Razelm lagoon of the Black Sea.

With a total surface area of 2,700 ha (27 km^{2}; 10 sq mi), the area can accommodate live-fire exercises for infantry and tanks at company level as well as artillery subunits. The facility is subordinated to the Cincu Training Center.

== Activities ==
In 2008, United States Army forces started to train at Babadag as part of Romania's integration into NATO.

In 2022, units of the 101st Airborne Division (that had returned to Europe for the first time since the end World War II) deployed to the Mihail Kogălniceanu Air Base have been training at the Babadag base, near the border with Ukraine.

In 2026, the ground exercises of the first part of the Exercise Sea Breeze were carried out in the area.
