= Ciucurova (river) =

Ciucurova Slava Cercheză
- Location within Romania

Location
- Country: Romania
- Counties: Tulcea County
- Villages: Ciucurova, Slava Cercheză

Physical characteristics
- Mouth: Slava
  - location: Slava Rusă
  - coordinates: 44.8544°N 28.5976°E
- Length: 24 km (15 mi)
- Basin size: 119 km^{2} (46 sq mi)

Basin features
- Progression: Slava→ Lake Golovița

The Ciucurova (also: Slava Cercheză) is a left tributary of the river Slava in Romania. It flows into the Slava in Slava Rusă. Its length is 24 km (15 mi) and its basin size is 119 km^{2} (46 sq mi).
