= Hamangia =

Hamangia may refer to:

- Hamangia, the former name of Baia, Tulcea, a commune in Tulcea County, Romania
- Hamangia culture
- Hamangia (river), a river in Tulcea County, Romania
