= Popina Island =

Protected natural reserve in Romania

Coordinates: 45.3°N 29.65°E

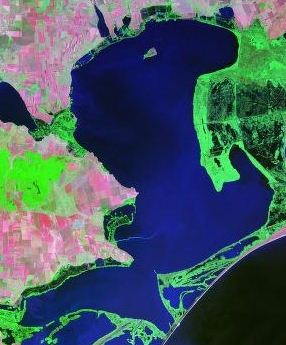
Lake Razelm. Popina Island is located towards the lake's northern shore

Popina Island is a Romanian island in the northern part of the Razelm Lake (Razim). The island spans 98 ha (240 acres) and it is a protected reserve, hosting an important nesting area for shelducks. Razelm Lake is the largest natural lake in Romania, and the largest permanent water expanse in the Danube Delta, separated from the Black Sea by two long grinds, and flows into Lake Golovița through a 3.1 km (1.9 mi) channel to the south.

== Fauna ==
Popina Island constitutes an important resting place for migratory birds and the nesting place for shelduck (Tadorna tadorna). In spring, one can find here swamp and forest birds like: nightingales (Luscinia megarhynchos), calandra larks (Melanocorypha calandra) and others. The invertebrate fauna comprises rarities like the European black widow (Latrodectus tredecimguttatus) and the giant myriapod (Scolopendra cingulata).

== Geology ==
Geologically speaking, Popina Island consists of Triassic limestones which crop out over the island. Some parts are covered by loess.

== Relevant literature ==
- Ungureanu, Daniel (2021). "Report of Paleontological Investigations in Popina Island". Academia.edu.
