= Sarighiol =

Sarighiol may refer to several places:

- Albești village, Constanța County, Romania
- Valea Nucarilor village, Tulcea County, Romania
- Sarighiol de Deal, a village in Beidaud Commune, Tulcea County, Romania
- Tarnovtsi, Tutrakan Municipality, Bulgaria
