= Argamum (castra) =

- Orgame
- Location within Romania
- 44.758231°N 28.940212°E
- Location: Jurilovca, Tulcea, Romania

Site notes
- Elevation: 19 m (62 ft)
- Condition: Ruined

Argamum was a coastal fort in the ancient Roman province of Moesia. It was near the ancient Greek and Roman city of Argamum. It is located on Cape Dolosman in Romania. It covered two and a half hectares.

== See also ==
- List of castra
