= Area Support Group Black Sea =

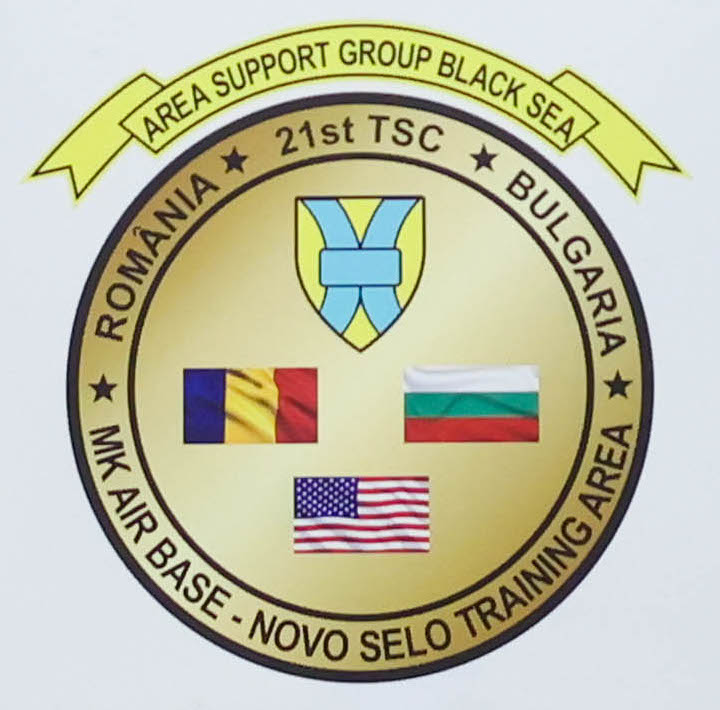
- Emblem of Area Support Group Black Sea
- Active: 2007 – 2010 (as Task Force East); 2010 – present
- Country: United States; Romania; Bulgaria
- Allegiance: United States European Command; U.S. Army Europe and Africa
- Branch: United States Army
- Part of: 21st Theater Sustainment Command
- Garrison/HQ: Mihail Kogălniceanu Air Base

Commanders
- Current Commander: COL Steven R. Overby
- Command Sergeant Major: CSM Thomas C. Schur

Area Support Group Black Sea is a United States European Command initiative executed by U.S. Army Europe (USAREUR) designed to strengthen relationships between the United States and its Eastern European allies. Area Support Group Black Sea is part of 21st Theater Sustainment Command, and provides base operations support and services for military personnel, civilians, and contractors in the Black Sea region, enabling readiness of permanent, rotational, allied, and expeditionary forces in Romania and Bulgaria.

ASG-BS involves a bilateral, long-term investment in both Romania and Bulgaria that strives to have a positive impact in the local areas by providing jobs for the local populace through service and support contracts in support of the operations; providing construction and medical humanitarian civil assistance projects in the local areas; and having a positive impact on the local economy by the presence of U.S. and other host nation-invited NATO forces.

Black Sea Area Support Group was established in 2007 as Joint Task Force-East. This program was an innovative element of the Theater Security Cooperation program that focuses on enhancing partner capacity and fostering regional cooperation. TF-East provided the U.S. and its partners in Romania and Bulgaria with training facilities and a periodic integrated combined staff that facilitated combined training.

Operations in Romania and Bulgaria also provided the U.S. and its partners the opportunity to engage in and demonstrate the continuance of peaceful and friendly international relations through combined training using host nation installations to support and facilitate rotational training activities. The used facilities include the Romanian Air Force Mihail Kogălniceanu Air Base (MKAB) located in the village of the same name and the Romanian Land Forces Babadag Training Area located approximately 70 km to the north. In Bulgaria, the primary facility is located in the Novo Selo Training Area (NSTA) located near Mokren, Bulgaria. These are sovereign host nation bases with co-located U.S. funded constructed facilities that the U.S. military uses on a consignment basis as stipulated in the Defense Cooperation Agreement signed by the governments involved. The U.S. military units training at the facilities are guests; they remain under a clear U.S. chain of command.

== History ==
=== Origin ===
While discussing initiatives directing the transformation of the U.S. military, Marine Gen. James L. Jones, Commander, U.S. European Command and Supreme Allied Commander Europe, testified before Congress in April 2003 of the need for the European Command to "shift west" (back to the continental U.S.), "shift south" (Africa), and "shift east" to forward operating bases with our new NATO partners.

The Eastern European Task Force (EETAF) concept envisioned a joint capable, deployable command and control headquarters that would not have permanently assigned combat forces, but which would command rotational forces operating out of sites in Romania (up to 1700 personnel) and Bulgaria (up to 2500 personnel). The EETAF HQ would be primarily responsible for supporting security cooperation activities throughout Eastern Europe. The Army component of EETAF would be a Brigade Combat Team (BCT) rotating on a four to six-month basis from the continental U.S. or Europe. The March 2006 Strategic Planning Guidance modified the presence requirement from a full-time BCT to a “periodic rotational force.”

U.S. Secretary of State Condoleezza Rice signed the Defense Cooperation Agreement with Romania in 2005, and Bulgaria in 2006 dictating the stipulations of the two bi-lateral agreements.

The EETAF concept described a two-phased process to "start small and grow" the objective capability. Phase I, from November 2004 to June 2007, involved USAREUR securing the necessary host nation agreements and constructing the facilities. Phase II would begin with the first "Proof of Principle" battalion-sized rotation in June 2007 and eventually followed by a full brigade combat team as the facilities, training areas and agreements were established and validated.

The 2007 Phase I "Proof of Principle" and the 2008 Rotation were successful in validating the EETAF concept and provided key insights for further development. Key construction tasks identified for accomplishment in Phase I were not completed and insights were gained indicating significant improvement and expansion of facilities and training areas was required to meet the original brigade-sized concept; but, the plans had been developed, a timeline established, and funding allocated to complete construction of the identified Permanent Forward Operating Site (PFOS) in Romania and, later, one in Bulgaria.

=== Facilities ===
In Romania prior to the first rotation in 2007, existing Mihail Kogălniceanu Airfield facilities were improved and temporary (prefabricated) facilities constructed to provide offices, billets, storage facilities, recreation and other life support needs to the JTF-East staff and rotational units. Most of these same temporary facilities, in addition to some remodeled structures, are what JTF-E used at MKAB through the 2009 rotation. In 2007, construction commenced in the former Romanian 34th Mechanized Brigade area in Mihail Kogălniceanu for a "permanent forward operating site” to provide necessary life and training support facilities on a more permanent basis for up to 1,600 troops. This $47.4 million facility was expected to be completed and fully operational before the 2010 rotation.

In the Romanian Land Forces Babadag Training Area, temporary facilities were constructed for the 2009 rotation that would accommodate up to 1,100. Similar facilities in Novo Selo Training Area, Bulgaria were also constructed to support the 2009 staff and rotational units there. - Both of these facilities were for joint and coalition use.

The new facilities in both Bulgaria and Romania include barracks, battalion and brigade headquarters, chapel, dining facility, community center, fire and military police stations, first-aid station, retail or department store, post office, movie theater, fitness center, maintenance shops, showers and restrooms, and other support buildings for training and storage.

In Bulgaria construction on a similar PFOS in the Novo Selo Training Area in Mokren, Bulgaria commenced construction in the winter of 2009 and was expected to be completed in 2012. The $54 million facility was designed for 2,500 troops, providing 77 fully functional, turn-key type facilities with associated roads and infrastructure.

=== After Proof of Principle ===
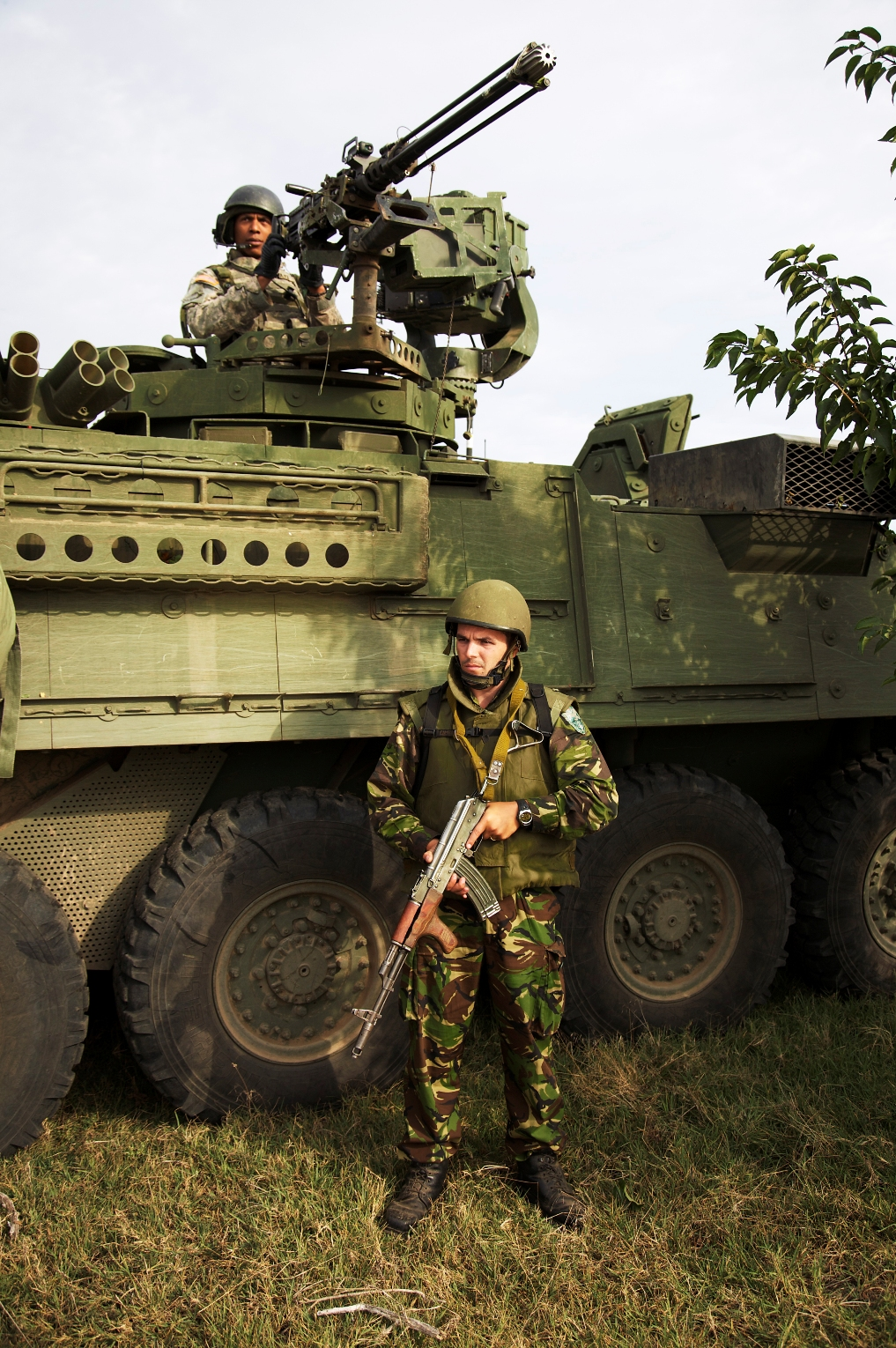
Romanian soldier stands in front of Stryker vehicle during training demonstration, 2009.

The original 2007 Proof of Principle was originally planned to be conducted by a battalion-sized element from the 2nd Stryker Cavalry Regiment (2SCR) that had deployed to Germany in 2006. Following the Proof of Principle, the construction and rotations would continue until the brigade combat team headquarters could be established by January 2008, followed by a full-up BCT-sized rotation in summer 2008. However, in May 2007, the Pentagon announced that the 2SCR would be participating in the surge of U.S. forces to Iraq. USAREUR replaced 2SCR's participation in the Proof of Principle with 1-94th Field Artillery battalion, a unit well-prepared to conduct the type of training envisioned to help prepare the Romanian and Bulgarian units scheduled to deploy to Iraq and Afghanistan. Approximately 350 U.S. and 100 Romanian troops participated in the Proof of Principle.

After the Proof of Principle exercise was completed, U.S. Army Europe issued an order for JTF-East to begin a period of "warm-basing" at the Mihail Kogălniceanu Airfield, Romania. The driver for this decision was the absence of any available rotational forces to occupy JTF-East due to the 2007 "surge" in Iraq, which significantly increased the number of troops deployed there. This decision to go to a warm-basing status was reinforced by the perception that the impact on rotational force availability would be temporary and that construction of the PFOS was not yet complete. As operational impacts grew clearer, in February 2008, USAREUR announced that the originally intended brigade-sized rotation would be downsized to a battalion for 2008. Due to the lack of forces available in Europe, the rotation was adjusted to a battalion-sized active component/reserve component mix. The 2008 Rotation was executed sequentially with training operations first in Romania then in Bulgaria. Approximately 3,100 total U.S., Romanian, and Bulgarian personnel participated in the first rotation. Of the 2,100 that participated in Romania, the U.S. units included the 1-200 Infantry of the New Mexico Army National Guard, the 541st Engineer Company and B Company, 1-4th Infantry Regiment and 1st Battalion, 94th Field Artillery from Germany; Romanian Land Forces included the 341st Infantry Battalion. Nearly 1,000 participants in Bulgaria included members of the 5th Battalion, 7th Air Defense Artillery out of Germany.

=== Concept of Warm-Basing ===
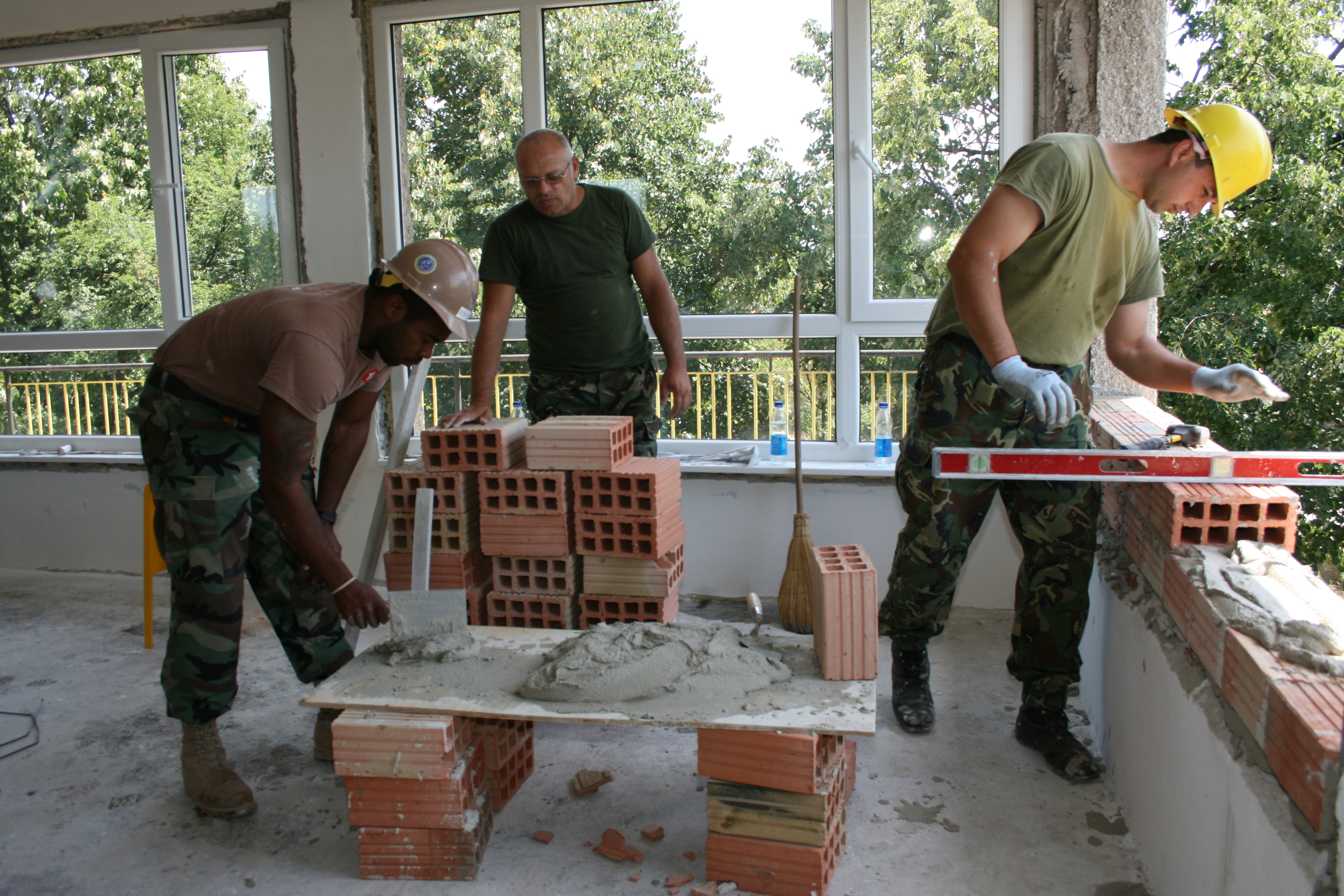
US and Bulgarian troops renovate a kindergarten

USAREUR directed the execution of "warm-basing" at JTF-East in November 2007 to maintain the facilities and facilitate various training missions and on-going humanitarian civil assistance (HCA) missions. The site at NSTA in Bulgaria was closed completely, while the area of the Temporary Forward Operating Site and PFOS construction at MKAB, Romania became the focal point of JTF-East efforts. The plan directed that USAREUR designate a lieutenant colonel as the warm-basing commander. The first commander was Lt. Col. John Moon for 2007–08 and second was Lt. Col. Tina Kracke for the winter of 2008–2009. The plan also directed a colonel be assigned as the commander to assume "full command authority" over all U.S. personnel operating on or from MKAB and NSTA during rotations. The first colonel designee was Col. Peri A. Anest. The staff was assigned as necessary to accomplish the mission. On occasion, USAREUR staff sections would surge additional personnel to JTF-East when required for a specific task or during a rotation.

During the 2009 rotation, the name "Joint Task Force-East" was formally changed to "Task Force-East" to more accurately depict the fact that the task force was led by a single U.S. military service component.

In 2008–2010 during the warm-basing period, the facility at Mihail Kogălniceanu Airfield hosted about 20 to 30 U.S. support personnel including U.S. Army personnel, U.S. government civilian employees, local national contract employees, and US Army Corps of Engineers employees who manage the construction of the PFOS. Most personnel are assigned for about a one to two-year tour of duty. In addition, since the summer of 2007, U.S. Navy Seabees detachments of 25 to 30 construction-men and women have been stationed in MKAB. They have been on six-month tours conducting HCA projects in the areas TF-East operates in both Romania and Bulgaria.

There was no significant personnel presence in Bulgaria during the off-season in 2010. The TF-East headquarters in Romania managed both operations except during the rotational exercises when a JTF-East “Forward” headquarters was stood up. The Bulgarian TF-East Forward headquarters was responsible to the TF-East commander in Romania.

=== Training ===
Training conducted at TF-East starts at the individual level and continues up to company-level in both Romania and Bulgaria. U.S. troops along with their host nation counterparts conduct both situational training exercises and live-fire exercises. In addition, staff elements are integrated at varying degrees for the duration of the operation to foster interoperability and working relationships.

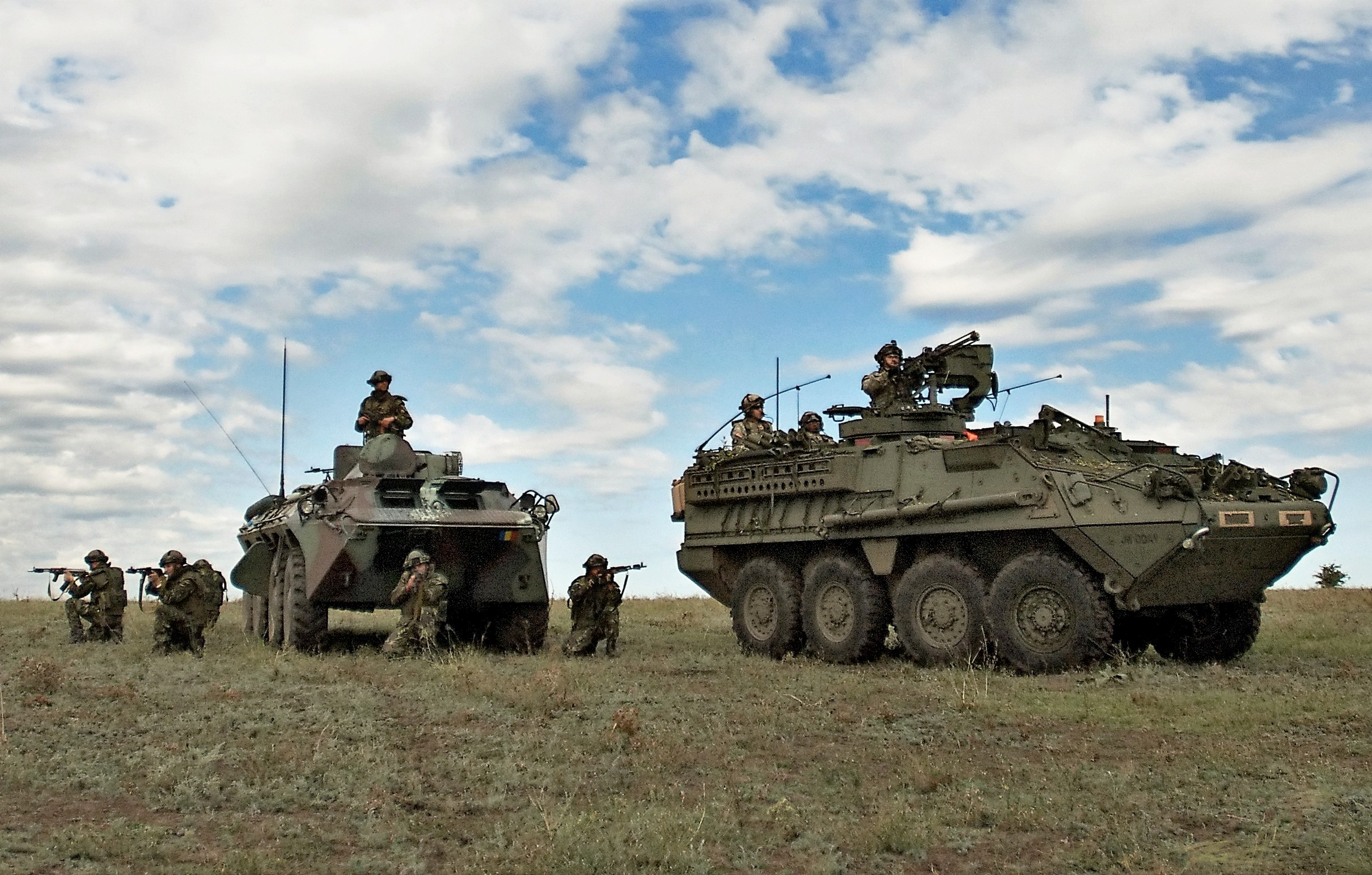
Romanians and Americans train together

Integrated training includes conducting individual and crew-served weapons qualification, mounted and dismounted situational training, live-fire training, mounted patrolling, combat lifesaver training, and familiarization and training on the use of non-lethal weapon systems.

Training equipment and vehicles have included High Mobility Multipurpose Wheeled Vehicles (HMMWV or Humvee), the Romanian's VAMTAC (Vehículo de Alta Movilidad Táctico; a Spanish-made 4-wheel drive military vehicle), variants of the U.S. Stryker Light Armored Vehicle, the Romanian and Bulgarian armored personnel carriers in addition to various logistical support vehicles and equipment to include the Reverse Osmosis Water Purification Unit and UH-60 Black Hawk helicopters. In addition, JTF-East provides training tools to include the Engagement Skills Trainer 2000 (EST 2000) and the HMMWV Egress Assistance Trainer (HEAT).

=== Headquarters ===
The rotational TF-E headquarters have been a combined staff of U.S.-Romanian (in Romania) and U.S.-Bulgarian (in Bulgaria) forces. Troops from the Romanian and Bulgarian Land Forces and U.S. Soldiers and civilians from throughout U.S. Army Europe filled the bulk of the manning requirements. U.S. Army Reserve individual augmentees, as well as a few service members from other U.S. service components and the National Guard, have rounded-out various positions as well. Several local national contracted employees also fill a number of the positions both during the rotational period and year-round.

== Joint Task Force-East/Task Force-East 2009 ==
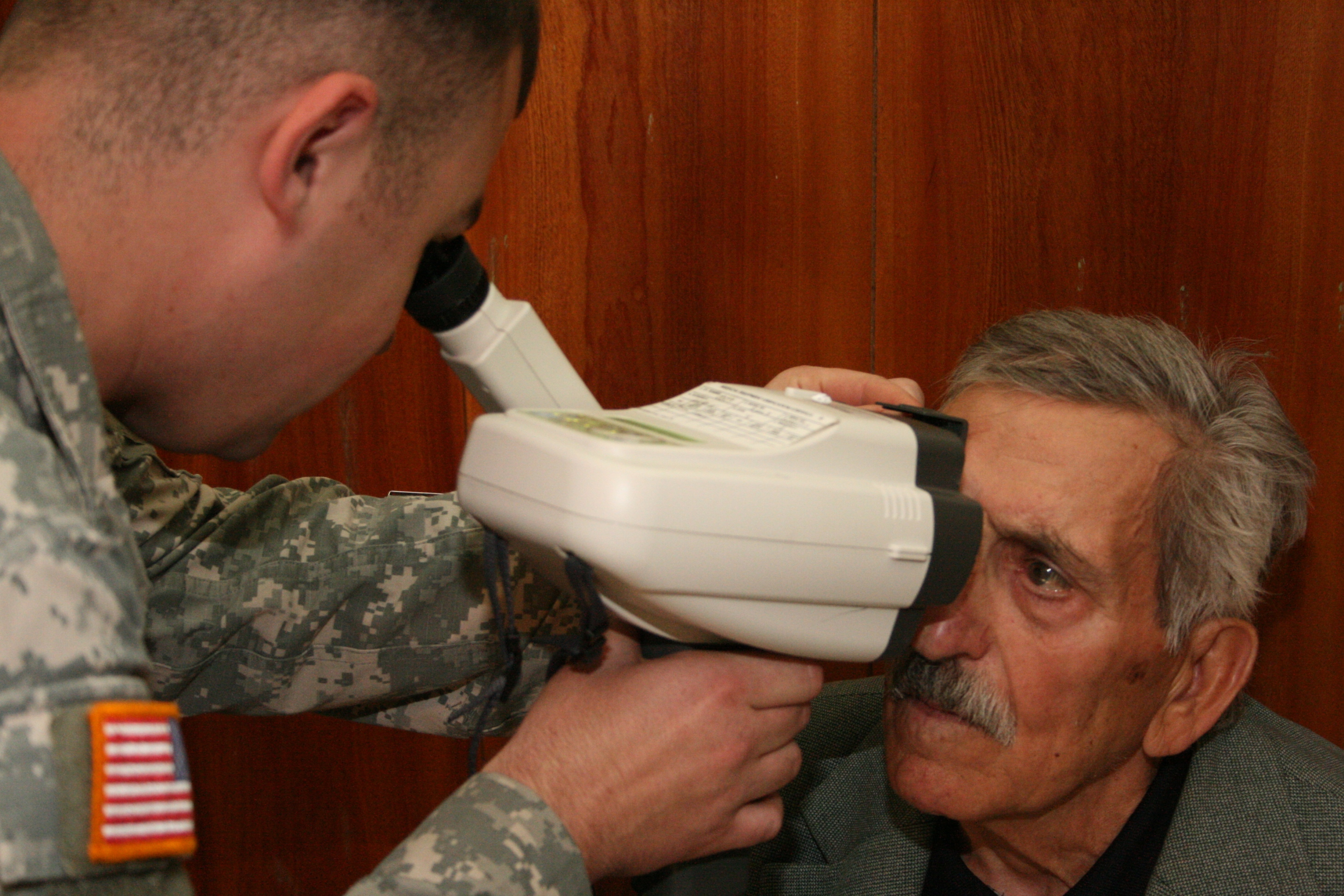
US military medics provide medical assistance in Bulgaria.

Commanded by Col. Gary R. Russ, the 2009 TF-East rotation in both Romania and Bulgaria included, for the first time, inclusion of approximately 30 Stryker combat vehicles in each country along with about the same number of Romanian and Bulgarian armored personnel carriers. The 2009 rotation was the first rotation with concurrent training for the duration of the rotation in both countries from the first week of August to the end of October.

In Romania, the rotation included approximately 1,600 personnel including U.S., Romanian military and civilian support and the rotational units. Approximately 180 soldiers were from the Tennessee Army National Guard’s 176th Combat Sustainment Support Battalion headquartered in Johnson City, Tenn.; nearly 450 soldiers were from the 4th Squadron, 2nd Stryker Cavalry Regiment from Vilseck, Germany. Romanian personnel numbered about 600 with service members from the 1st Infantry Division to include the 33rd Mountain Troop Battalion, Posada.

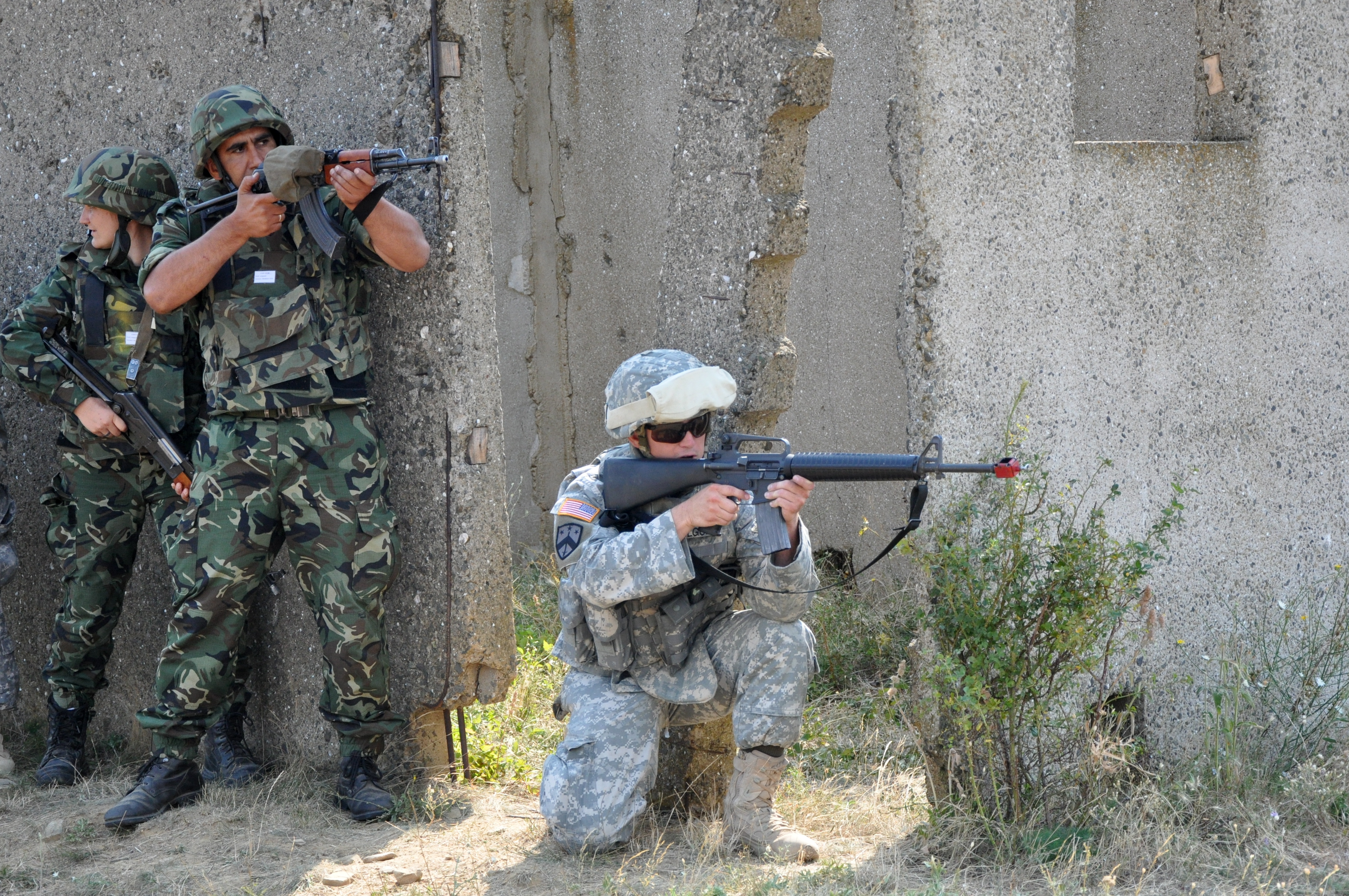
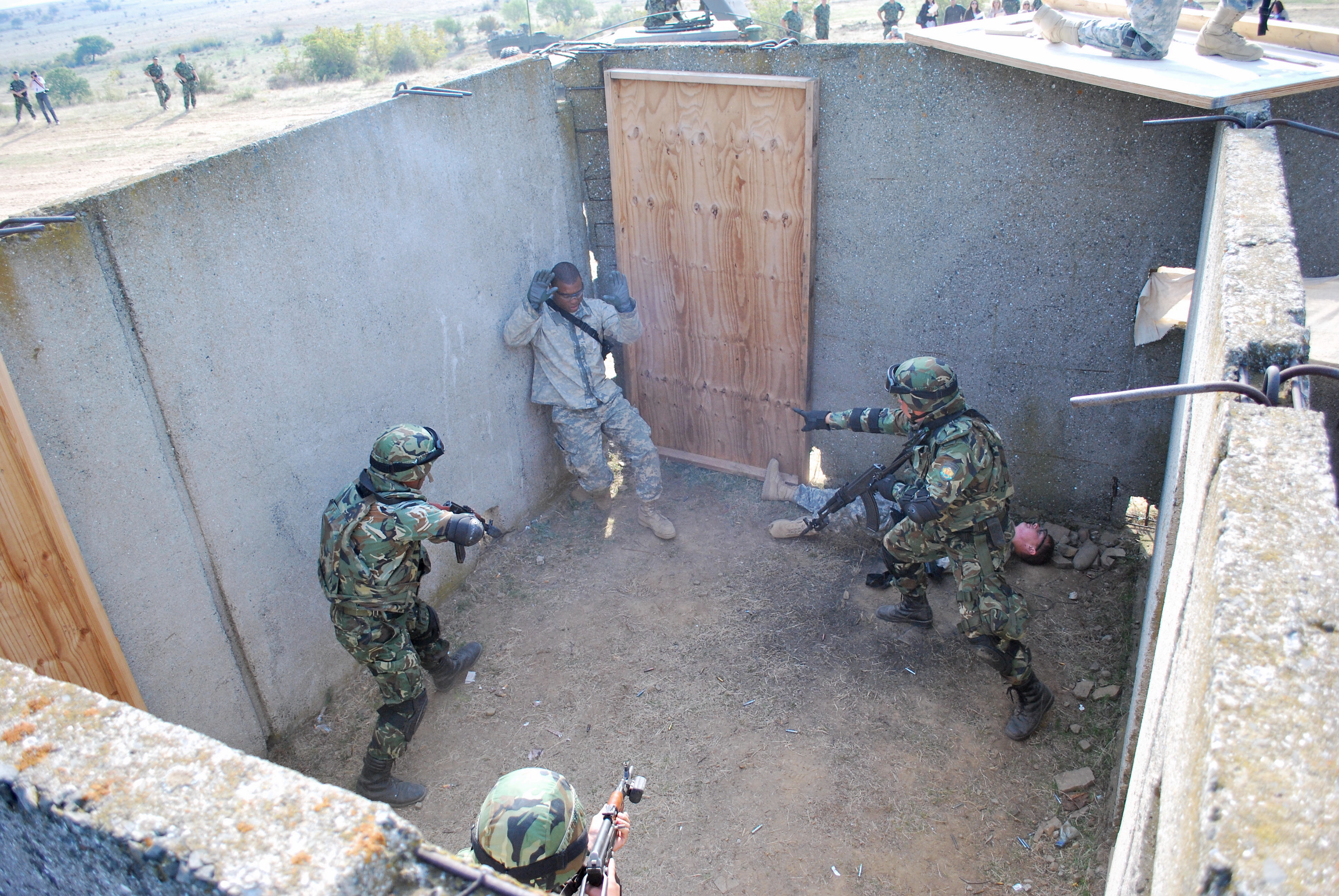
Bulgarian Land Forces, U.S. Soldiers train on military operations on urban terrain tactics.

U.S. units training in Bulgaria included over 1,400 personnel including soldiers from the Tennessee Army National Guard's 1-181st Field Artillery Battalion out of Chattanooga, Tenn.; 2nd Squadron, 2nd Stryker Cavalry Regiment, from Vilseck, Germany, and the Tennessee Army National Guard's 117th Military Police Battalion. Over 500 Bulgarian Land Forces participated including the 4th Artillery Regiment of Asenovgrad; 68th Special Forces Brigade from Plovdiv; 61st Mechanized Brigade of Karlovo; 5th Mechanized Brigade of Pleven; and Center for Preparation of Tank Specialists out of Sliven.

Other rotational activities included humanitarian civic assistance construction missions conducted by U.S. Navy Seabees in partnership with Romanian and Bulgarian Land Force engineers. With an average cost of approximately $15,000 in materials per project over the last two years, the program executed locally by TF-East included renovations of public facilities to include kindergartens, community centers, medical facilities and school fences.

During the 2009 rotation, approximately $185,000 in HCA funds were spent supporting five projects in Bulgaria and four in Romania. Since 2007, about 38 projects have been completed in the communities around the TF-East operational areas in Bulgaria and Romania. The HCA missions are intended to help the local communities, build positive relations, and help set conditions for the success of TF-East.

TF-East also executed medical HCA missions during 2009 rotation helping approximately 3,700 local people in 17 different communities in and around the JTF-East operational area in both Bulgaria (9 villages) and Romania (8 villages). In partnership with Romanian and Bulgarian military and community medical professionals, an 11-member U.S. medical team provided medical and dental screenings, public health education and optometry screenings to include distributing nearly 3,400 eyeglasses to people who couldn't otherwise afford them. In addition, TF-East acquired and distributed $18,000 of locally purchased HCA program-funded pharmaceuticals for dispensing to locals free of charge by the community medical professionals in Romania. The drugs were specifically purchased to target the main health issues identified by the HCA medical team during the screenings.

== 2009–2010 ==
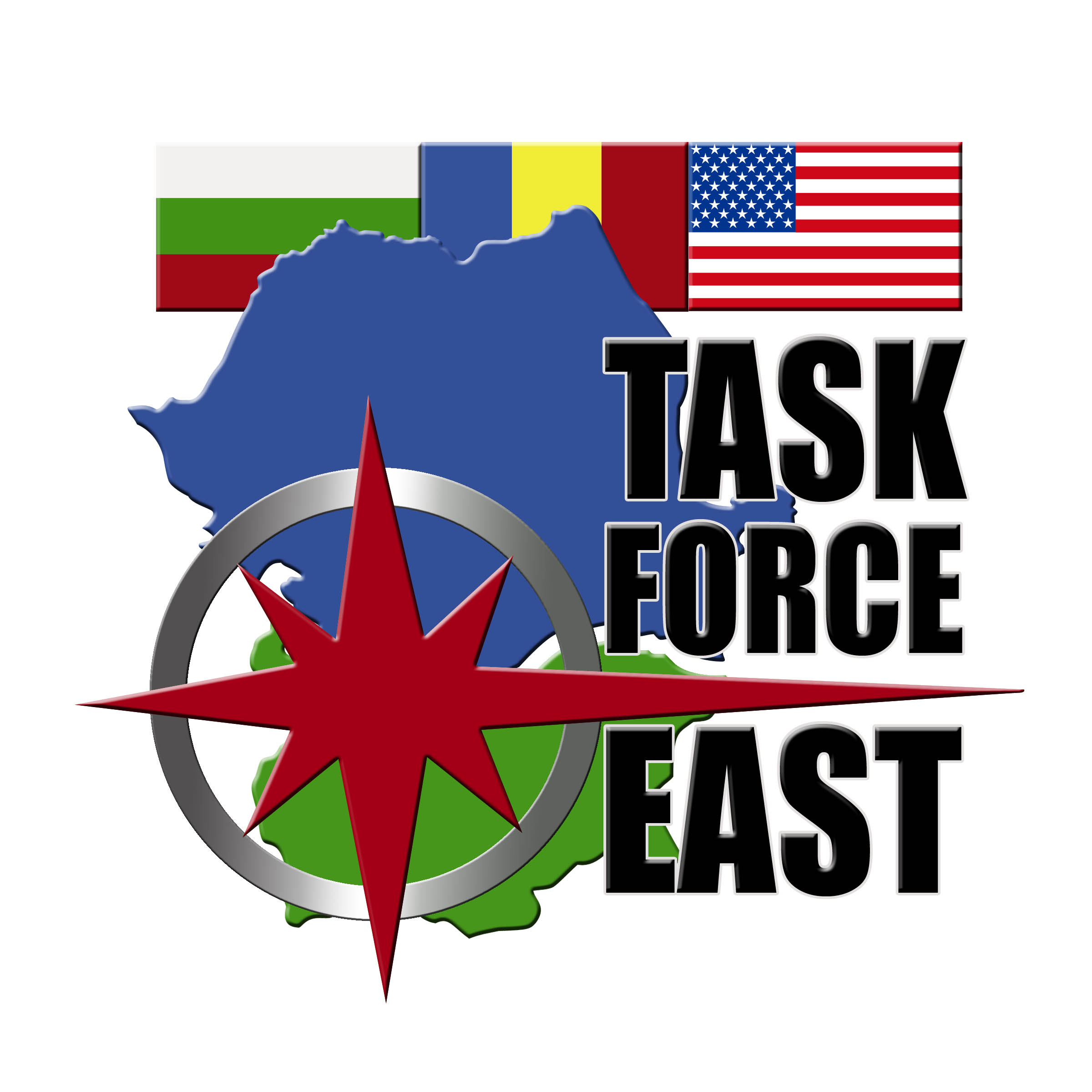
Task Force East logo

The year 2009 marked the third rotation of JTF-E/TF-East. It continued to be one of the USAREUR commander's strategic priorities, playing a key role in EUCOM's theater security cooperation program. Romania and Bulgaria are strong and important allies of the U.S. and have provided consistent support to U.S. overseas contingency operations. Training together hones and develops techniques, tactics, and procedures that assist tactical units in working together in combat. Building interoperability, professional, and personal relationships are essential for the success of current coalitions.

Planners continued to work the details to expand the success TF-East has had over the past three years. With the anticipated completion of the facility in Mihail Kogălniceanu, Romania in 2010 and the facility in Novo Selo Training Area, Bulgaria in 2012, even more opportunities for combined training will emerge allowing the already strong U.S.-RO and U.S.-BU relationships to grow even further.

In 2010 the programme changed its name to the 'Black Sea Area Support Team' (BS-AST). The mission of the Black Sea Area Support Team became to provide base operations support to U.S. Forces in the Black Sea theater of operations. This includes, but is not limited to, providing life support, logistics support, base camp operations, reception, staging, fiscal management and budgetary activities, and coordination of force protection of U.S. military and government civilians in the area of responsibility. Also in 2010, the Black Sea Rotational Force of the United States Marine Corps began its deployments in the Black Sea region. These deployments lasted until 2018.

== 2010–present ==
In January 2016, Major General William Gayler, the deputy commanding general U.S. Army Europe, visited MK Air Base and conducted a site assessment of capability, capacity and potential for expansion of the logistic hub. On 1 October 2016, the Headquarters, Black Sea Area Support Team was established to provide O6 level command authority over the mission. The same year, the Army Support Activity-Black Sea (ASA-Black Sea) was established as part of Installation Management Command with the mission of delivering base operations support, logistics, and administrative services. ASA-Black Sea assumed responsibility for the quality of life and infrastructure services from BS-AST.

In September 2018, Colonel Wesley Murray assumed command over Black Sea Area Support Team, succeeding Colonel James McGlaughn. In 2019, the Area Support Group Black Sea (ASG-BS) began to oversee operations in Romania, Bulgaria and Greece. The operations in Greece involved the Army installations in Volos, Thessaloniki, and Alexandroupolis.

== Russian reaction ==
The JTFE resulted in numerous declaration and policy changes from the Russian Federation:

- At the Munich Security Conference in 2007, Vladimir Putin made an unexpectedly confrontational speech denouncing "the so-called flexible frontline American bases".
- Thereafter Foreign Minister Sergei Lavrov suspended Russia's participation in the Conventional Forces in Europe Treaty, arguing that "U.S. bases in Romania and Bulgaria [...] only complicate arms control in Europe".
- In 2008 Russia increased its defense spending, multiplied airspace incursions by its bombers, and engaged in arms sales to countries opposed to US policies, such as Iran and Venezuela. The pinnacle of this defiant attitude was the Russia–Georgia war. Defending the Russian invasion, Dmitry Medvedev argued that NATO, unlike Russia, was "broadening the borders of military presence" by "creating new bases."
