= Argamum =

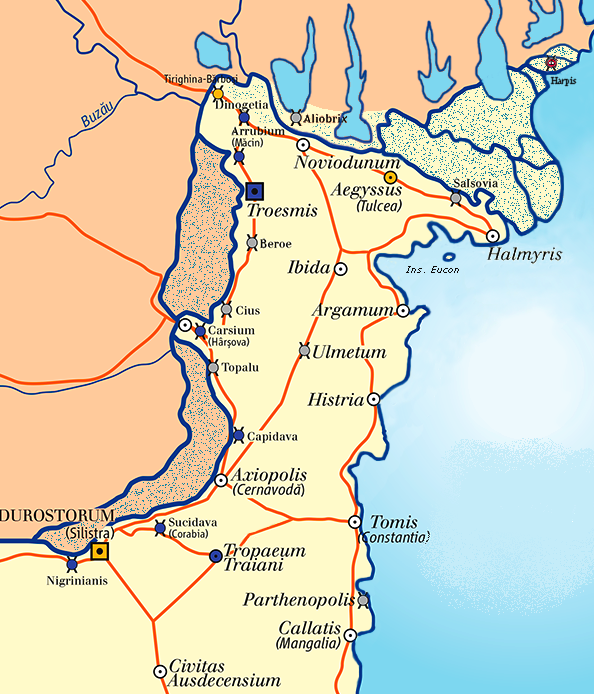
Ancient towns and colonies in part of Moesia Inferior (ancient coastline)

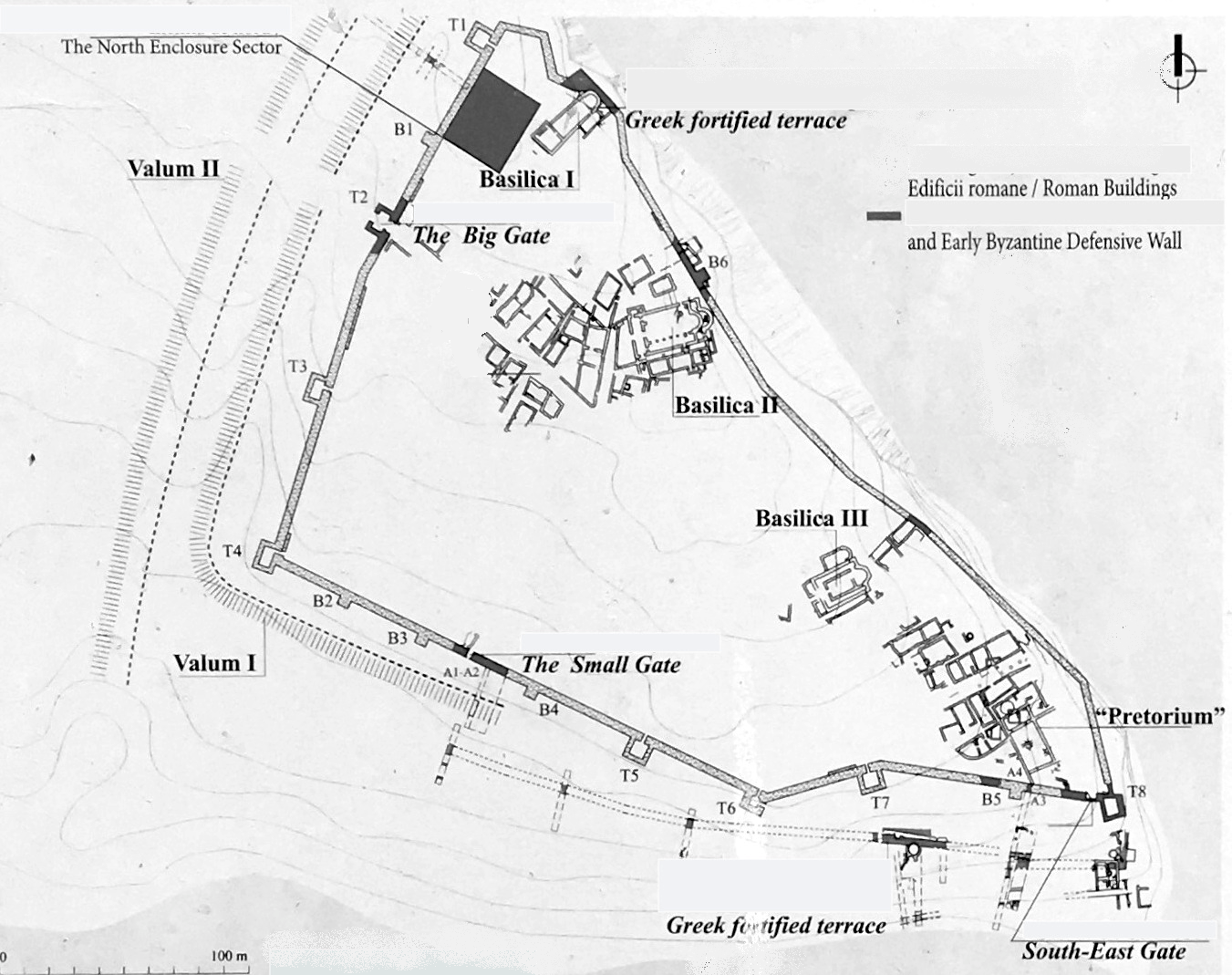
Argamum plan

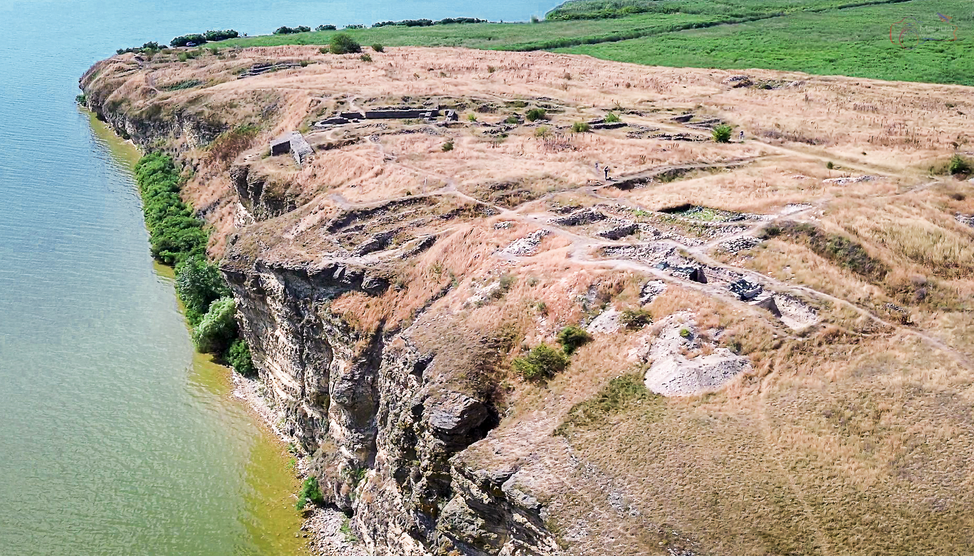
Argmamum

Argamum (Orgame in ancient Greek) was originally an ancient Greek city located on the coast of the Black Sea on the present Cape Dolosman in Romania near Jurilovca, on the coastal lagoon that in ancient times was the open sea. It was founded by Greek colonists from Asia Minor together with other nearby cities (Histria, Tomis, and Kallatis).

Orgame is the oldest city mentioned by Hecataeus of Miletus (c. 550-476 BC) and excavations at the site show the earliest Greek presence on the western shore of the Black Sea. It was probably founded in the 7th century BC and chosen for its good defensive strategic position on cliffs, with easy access to the Danube Delta, rich in fish, and to the interior for trade.

Orgame was destroyed by fire in the same period as Histria (520-490 BC) probably during the Scythian campaign of Darius I or due to an earthquake.

In 71 BC the Romans under Marcus Terentius Varro Lucullus, the proconsul of Macedonia, occupied the city and the rest of Dobrogea, but did not leave garrisons afterwards.

In 29 BC Orgame came under Roman domination when Marcus Licinius Crassus, proconsul of Macedonia, annexed the whole of Dobrogea after his military campaign against the Bastarnae who had crossed the Danube and threatened Roman allies in Thrace. This was part of Augustus's strategy after establishing himself as sole ruler of the Roman state, of advancing the empire's south-eastern European border to the Danube to increase strategic depth between the border and Italy and also to provide a major fluvial supply route between the Roman armies in the region. It became a Roman city in the province of Moesia, later Scythia Minor.

In the 7th century, the entry of the Bulgars into the Byzantine Empire and the closure of the Gulf of Argamum which became the Iancina river (today Razim) caused the city to be abandoned and fall into ruins.

== The city ==
The necropolis was outside the walls to the north-west. The oldest burial dates from the middle of the 7th century BC and was also the most important tumulus belonging to a very important person, maybe the founder of the city whose cremated bones were placed in a larnax (wooden box).

City walls dating from the 6th c. BC were built to the south of the later southern Roman wall.

In an area southwest of the walls that had been a Hellenistic necropolis, Roman buildings were developed and street 9 m wide. This area was destroyed in the Gothic invasion of 378 AD and was later used again as a burial ground.

4 large paleo-christian basilicas from the 5-6th centuries AD have been excavated and can be seen today, showing the city's importance in this period. In the northwestern corner of the city a barracks was also built in the 5th-6th centuries.

In Lake Razim opposite Argamum lies Bisericuta Island, 360 m long and 58 m wide, half of which is occupied by a limestone hill 9 m high. Archaeological remains were discovered on the island on several layers from the Hellenistic era (5th - 4th centuries BC) and the Roman era.

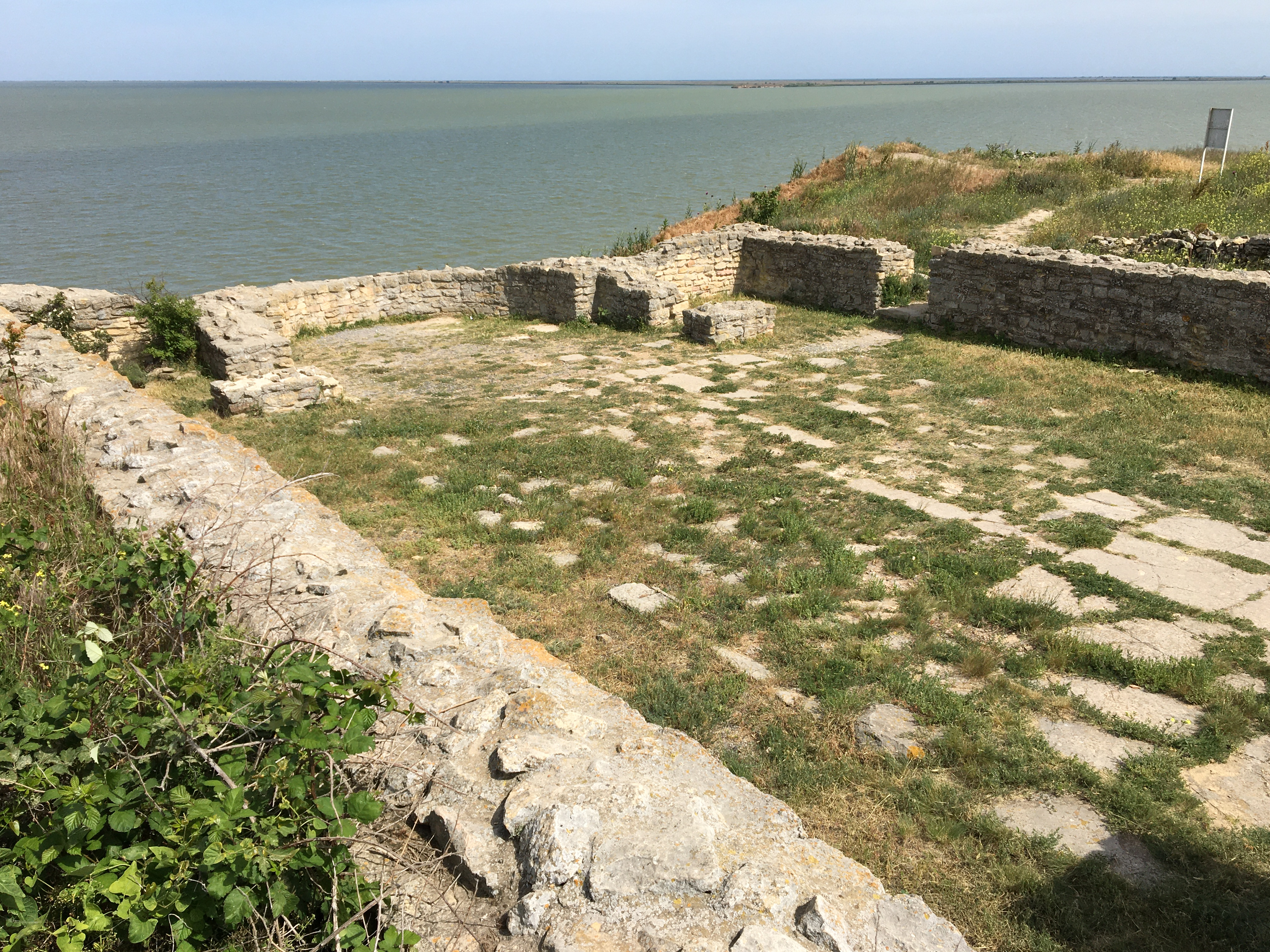
Basilica 1

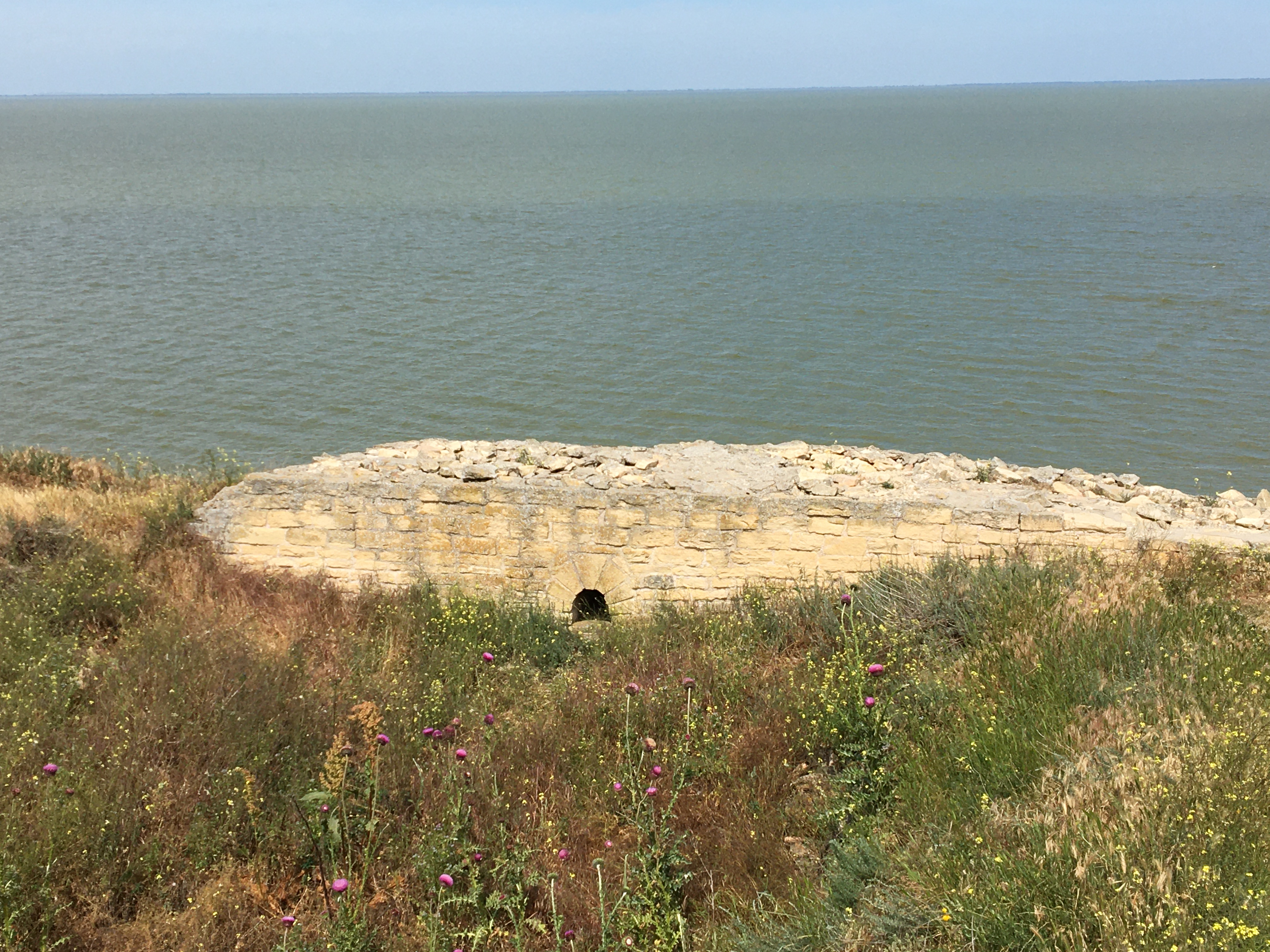
Northern walls

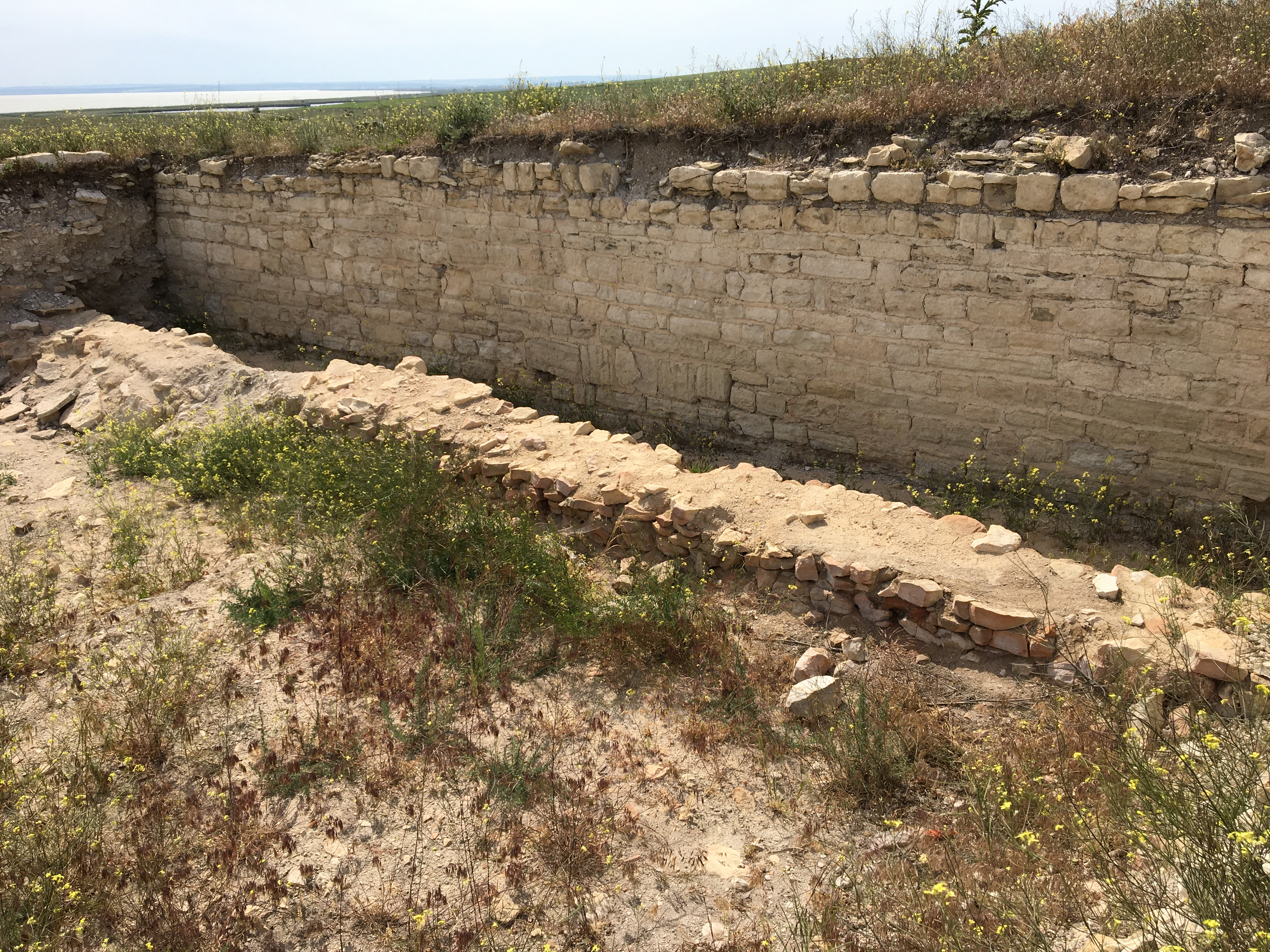
Western walls

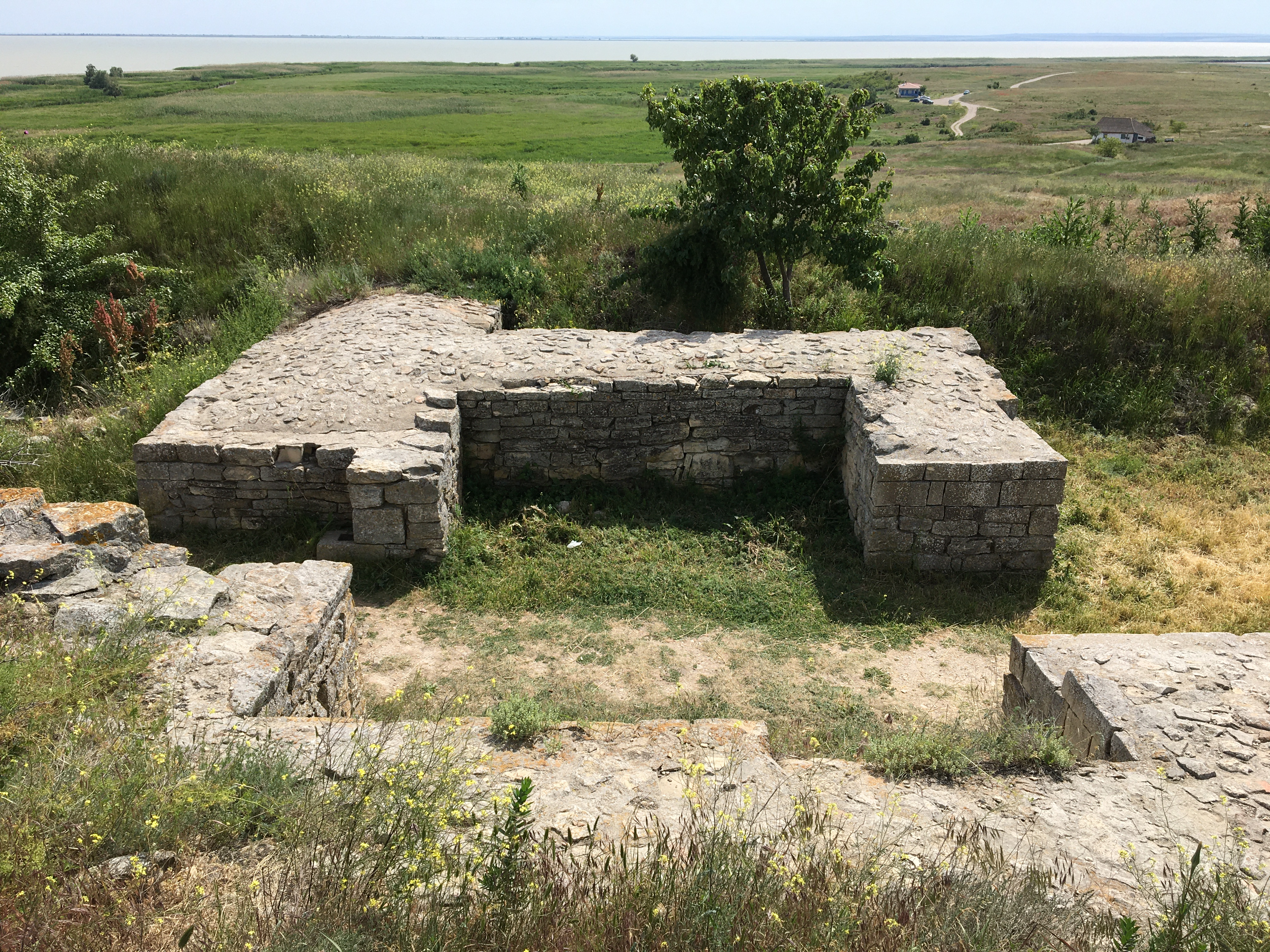
Western gate

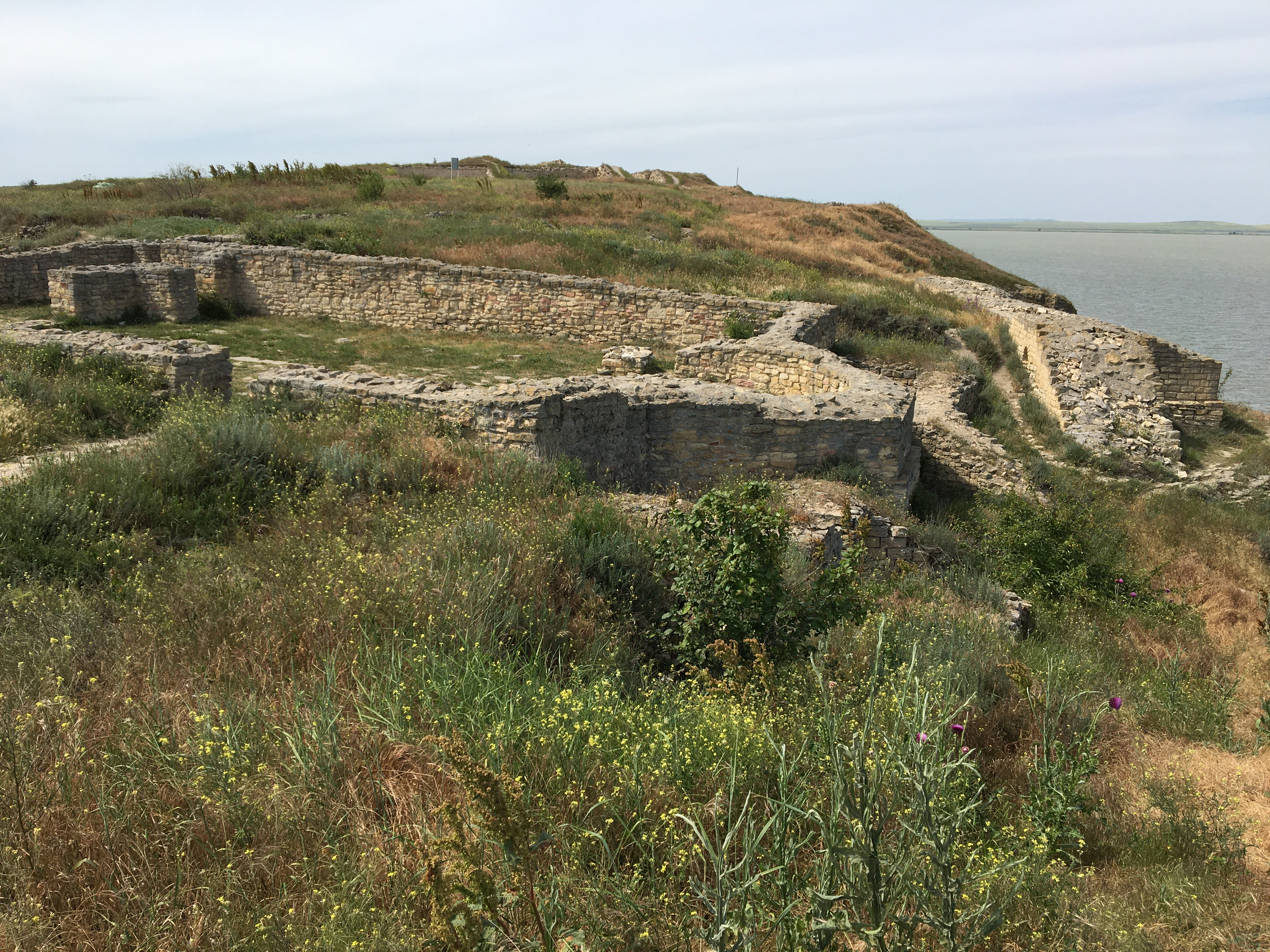
Basilica 2

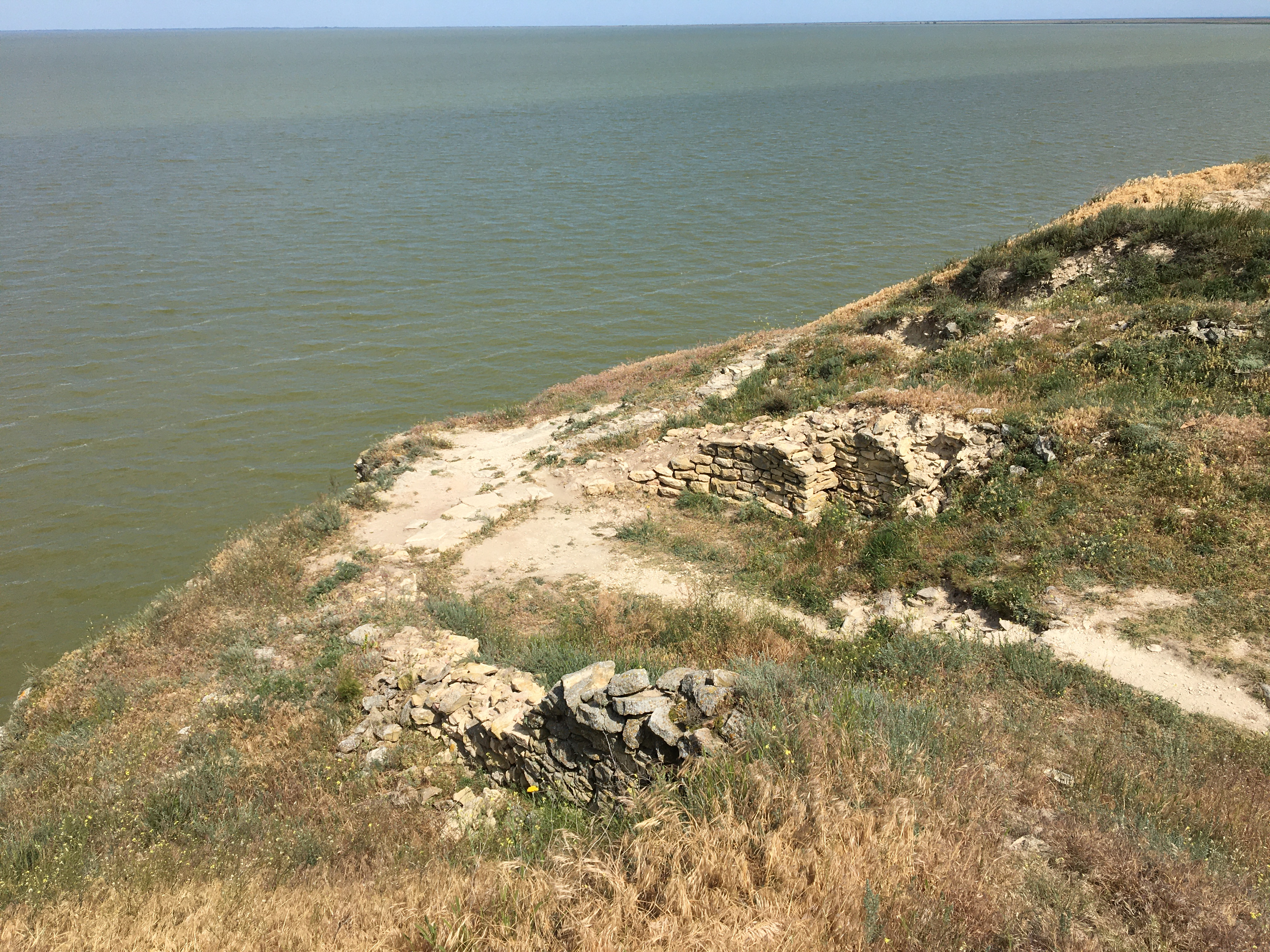
Basilica 3

== Sources ==
- COJA 1972 – M. Coja, Cercetări noi în așezarea greco-romană de la capul Doloșman – Argamum?, BMI 41, 1972, 3, 33–42.
