= Jubë =

- Village
- Location within Albania
- Coordinates: 41°25′23″N 19°30′50″E
- Country: Albania
- County: Durrës
- Municipality: Durrës
- Administrative unit: Katund i Ri
- Time zone: UTC+1 (CET)
  - Summer (DST): UTC+2 (CEST)

Jubë is a village in the Durrës County, western Albania. At the 2015 local government reform it became part of the municipality Durrës.
