= Baia, Tulcea =

Baia
- Commune
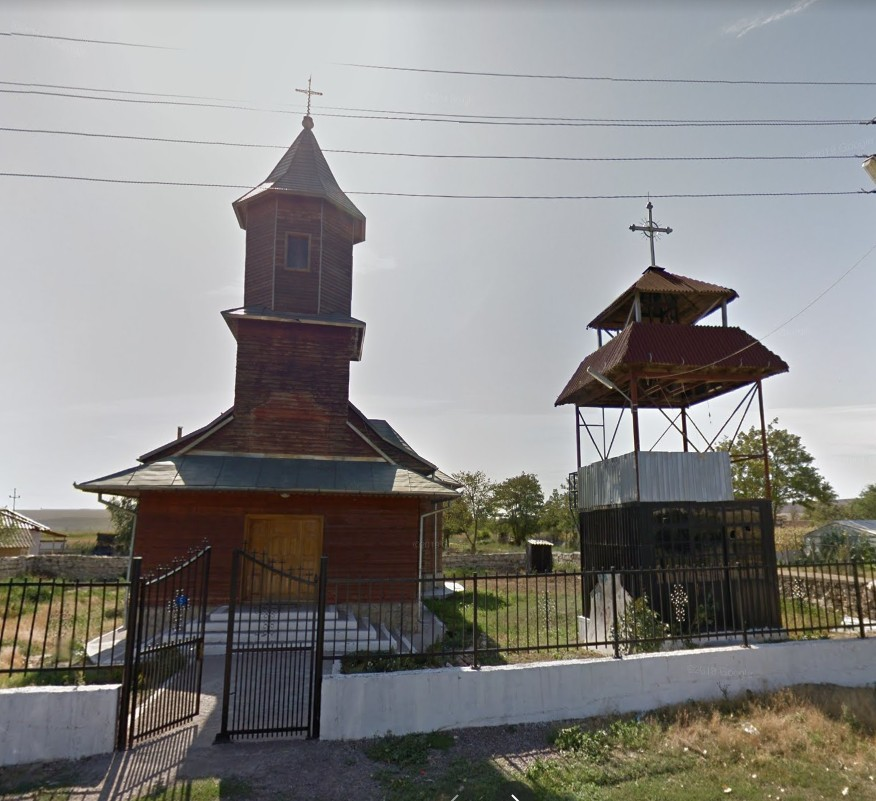
- St. Demetrius Church in Camena

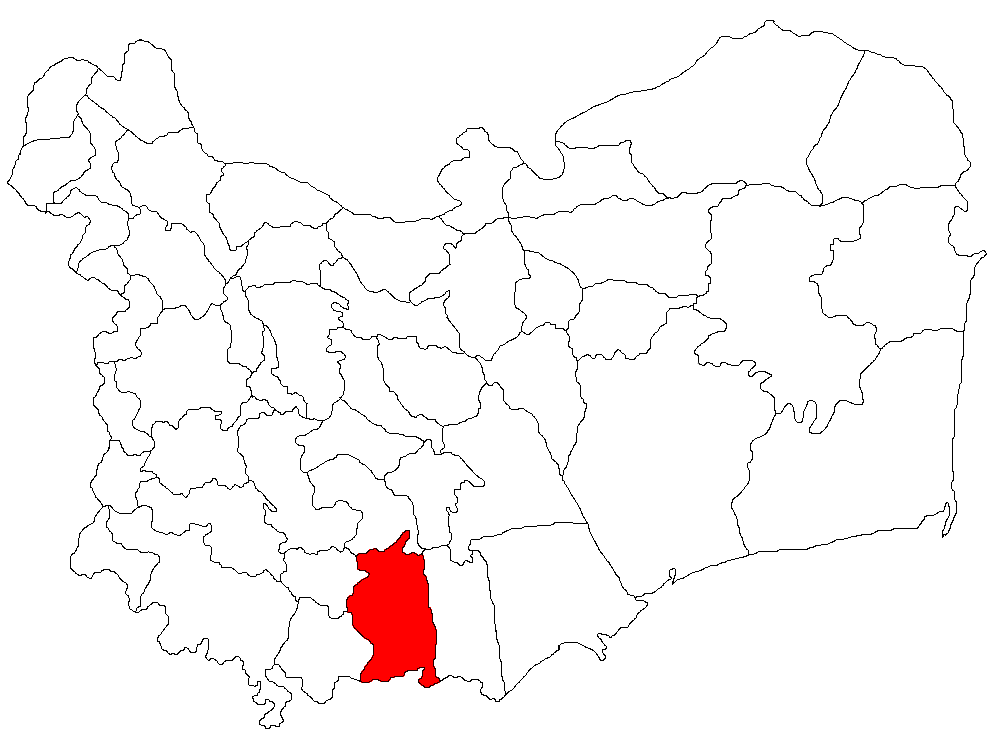
- Location in Tulcea County

- Location in Romania
- Coordinates: 44°43′N 28°40′E
- Country: Romania
- County: Tulcea
- Subdivisions: Baia, Camena, Caugagia, Ceamurlia de Sus, Panduru

Government
  - Mayor (2020–2024): Mugurel Marșavela (PSD)
- Area: 198.29 km^{2} (76.56 sq mi)
- Elevation: 10 m (33 ft)
- Population (2021-12-01): 4,161
  - Density: 20.98/km^{2} (54.35/sq mi)
- Time zone: UTC+02:00 (EET)
  - Summer (DST): UTC+03:00 (EEST)
- Postal code: 827005
- Area code: +40 x40
- Vehicle reg.: TL
- Website: www.primarie-comuna-baia.ro

Baia (Romanian pronunciation: [ˈbaja]) is a commune in Tulcea County, Northern Dobruja, Romania.

== Villages ==
The commune includes five villages:

- Baia (Hamangia until 1929, Turkish: Hamamci)
- Camena
- Caugagia (Turkish: Kavgaci)
- Ceamurlia de Sus (Yeni Kazak until ca. 1855)
- Panduru (Potur until 1929)

== History ==
In 1953, archaeological excavations on a site along the Lake Golovița, near Baia, led to the discovery of a new Middle Neolithic culture, named after the commune. Further research has shown that the culture, with Mediterranean origins, extended across Dobruja and North-Eastern Bulgaria. The culture's most notable artefact is an anthropomorphic statuette in terra cotta, known as The Thinker, which was discovered at Cernavodă.
