= Black Sea Rotational Force =

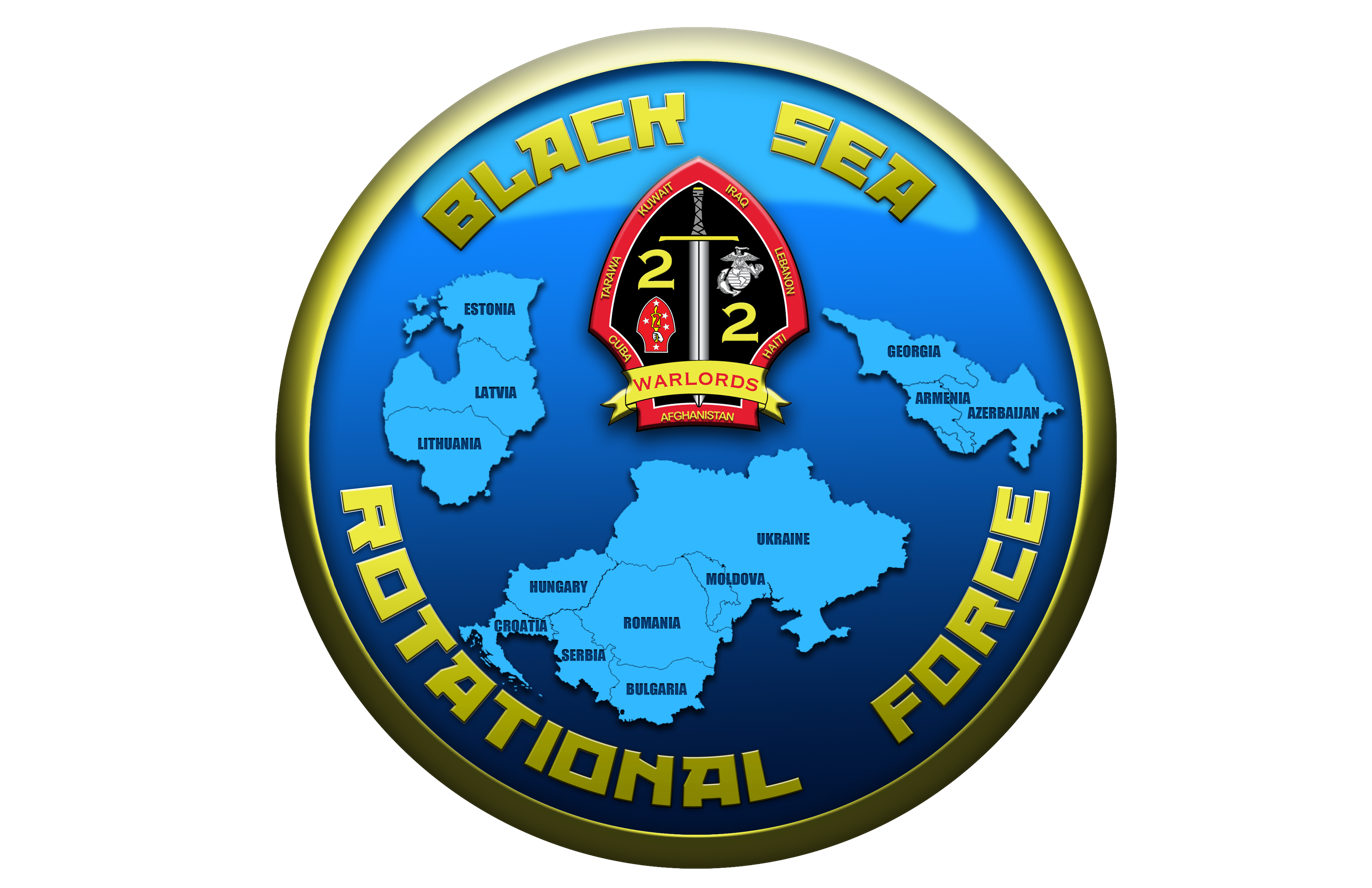
- Black Sea Rotational Force insignia
- Active: 2010–2018
- Country: United States
- Branch: United States Marine Corps
- Type: Special-Purpose Marine Air Ground Task Force
- Role: Promote regional stability, increase interoperability, build and maintain enduring partnerships with allied and partner nations and maintain collective security in the region.
- Part of: United States European Command
- Garrison/HQ: Romanian Land Forces Mihail Kogălniceanu Airbase

Commanders
- Current commander: Lt. Col. David M. Fallon

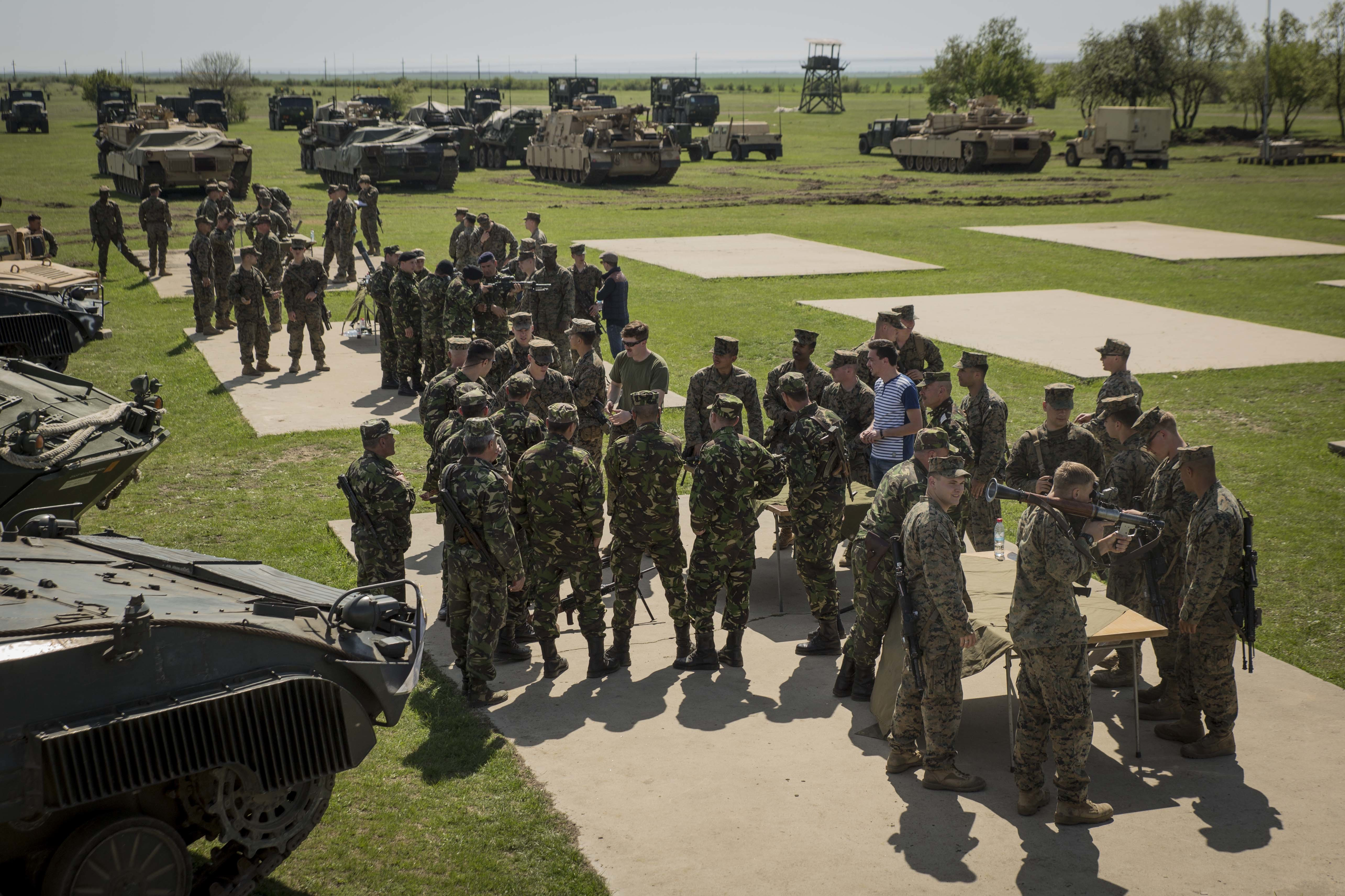
Black Sea Rotational Force Marines and Romanian soldiers at the Babadag Romanian Army Training Area, 2016

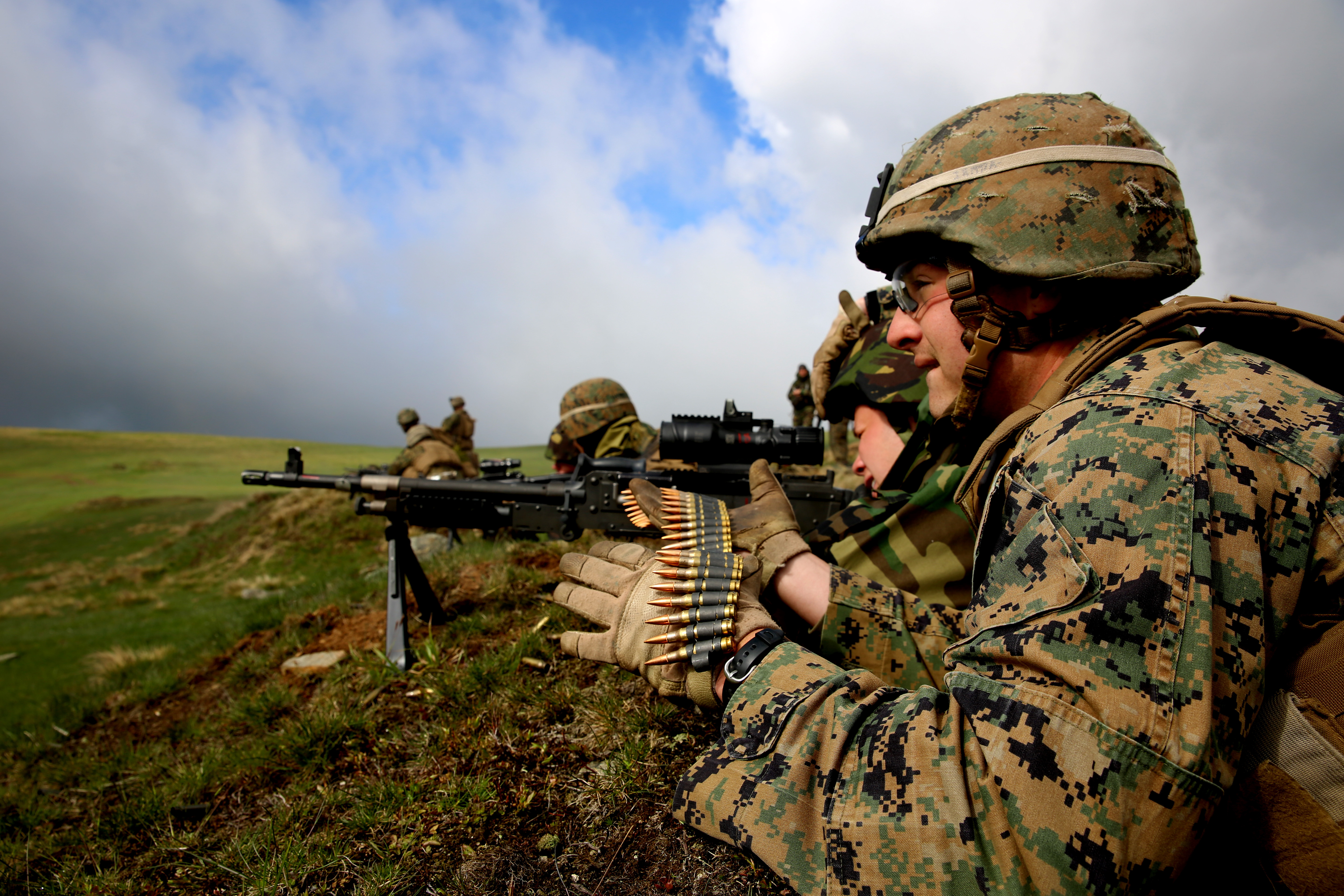
A Romanian soldier with the 17th Vânători de munte Battalion fires an M240B machine gun with a U.S. Marine with Black Sea Rotational Force, during a live-fire exercise in the Carpathian Mountains, 2014

Black Sea Rotational Force began in 2010 with the purpose to form a Security Cooperation Marine Air-Ground Task Force. The forward postured troops' ability to conduct military-to-military engagements with partner nations in Eastern Europe while providing the capacity for rapid crisis response made it an essential year-round mission to U.S. European Command (EUCOM) and their partners in the Eastern European Theater. The biannual rotation of Marines and sailors with BSRF are postured at the Mihail Kogălniceanu Airbase, Romania, which enables the continuation of promoting regional stability, increasing interoperability, and building and maintaining enduring partnerships with allied and partner nations.

It is an outgrowth of the previous Joint Task Force East, which was planned to be a rotational brigade-sized Army force.

In 2010, the first year of the program, more than 100 Marines from across the United States deployed to form a Security Cooperation Marine Air-Ground Task Force, primarily based at Romania's Mihail Kogălniceanu International Airport.

Black Sea Rotational Force 13 deployed for six months from February to August 2013 as a Special Purpose Marine Air-Ground Task Force (SP-MAGTF) and consisted of almost 300 United States Marines and United States Navy sailors primarily from 2nd Battalion, 2nd Marine Regiment, 2nd Marine Division. The unit trained with 21 partner nations in the region, including Romania, Georgia, Ukraine, Bulgaria, Macedonia, Bosnia and Herzegovina, Serbia, Albania, Greece, Azerbaijan, Montenegro, and Croatia.

Training evolutions consisted of counterinsurgency and peacekeeping operations, communications, logistics, non-lethal weapons employment, military decision-making processes and non-commissioned officer development. The unit also participated in larger exercises such as Agile Spirit 13 in the Republic of Georgia. BSRF-13 will also conduct community relations and civic action projects in and around the port city of Constanța, e.g., improving schools and hospitals, as well as in Bulgaria, Georgia, and Ukraine.

Roughly 500 Marines and sailors from 2nd Battalion, 8th Marine Regiment, 2nd Marine Division were assigned to the 2015 iteration, BSRF-15.1.

BSRF-15.1 engaged with more than 20 countries to include: Romania, Bulgaria, Latvia, Slovenia, Azerbaijan, Macedonia, Serbia, Estonia, Kosovo, Georgia, Lithuania, Hungary, Armenia, Czech Republic, Poland, Moldova, Albania, Macedonia, and Bosnia. The military engagements consist of military-to-military familiarization events in the areas of basic infantry skills, communications, logistics, non-lethal systems employment, combat life-saving and emergency first aid techniques, the military decision-making process, and noncommissioned officer and junior officer development.

The targeted security cooperation activities with partner-nations in the Black Sea, Balkan, and Caucasus regions enhance professional military capacity and increase interoperability. These engagements, along with several joint-level training exercises bolster the United States' relationships with partner nations in order to collectively address common security challenges in the region.

In 2015 the effort included a Combined Arms Company, bringing tanks for training. In late August of that year one-hundred and sixty Marines arrived at the Novo Selo Range in eastern Bulgaria, along with armor, artillery, and reconnaissance vehicles, to train with allied forces. Training will involve anti-tank tactics and other weapons skills and involve three six-month rotations.

The Black Sea Rotational Force finished its deployment to Romania in 2018. Following the end of the Black Sea Rotational Force, the Marine Corps deployed to Norway as part of the Marine Rotational Force-Europe, where marines will carry out cold weather and mountain warfare training.

== See also ==
- Task Force East
- United States Marine Forces Europe and Africa
