= Lake Razelm =

Lagoon in Romania

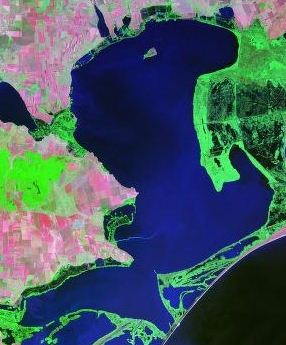

- Location in Romania
- Coordinates: 44°49′36″N 28°59′05″E
- Primary outflows: Lake Golovița
- Basin countries: Romania
- Max. length: 28.5 km (17.7 mi)
- Max. width: 15 km (9.3 mi)
- Surface area: 511 km^{2} (197 sq mi)
- Residence time: 300–600 days
- Islands: Popina Island
- Settlements: Sarichioi

Lake Razelm or Lake Razim (Romanian: Limanul Razim, Limanul Razelm) is a large freshwater lagoon on the shores of the Black Sea in Romania, south of the Danube Delta and part of its World Heritage Site. It is the largest liman in Romania.

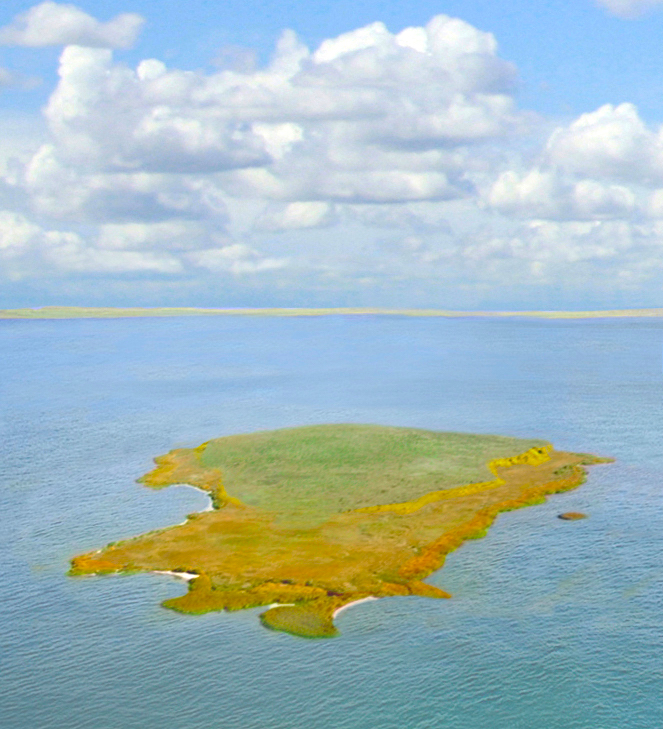
Popina Island

The name is also sometimes applied to the complex it forms with several other limans and lagoons. This complex can be separated into two subgroups. The northern subgroup contains fresh water Razelm and Lake Golovița, which are connected by a channel 3.1 km (1.9 mi) wide, whereas the southern group is made up of salt lakes. All these lakes cover an area of about 1,000 km^{2} (390 sq mi), of which 400 km^{2} (150 sq mi) is the area of Lake Razelm alone.

== Ecology ==
When the Razelm/Golovița system was closed off from the sea in the late 1970s, this resulted in several changes to the ecological conditions of the system, including a decrease in salinity to almost zero, an increase in refreshment time to over a year, and episodes of eutrophication. Despite this environmental degradation, the system remains an important habitat. Three families of cockles could be found in Romania in the 1960s, and the two that remain are found only in Razelm (albeit at reduced densities). Popina Island at the north end of the lake is an important refuge for many bird species and invertebrates. The recent ecological study suggests that the Razim-Sinoie lagoon system is close to the good ecological status according to the requirements of the Water Framework Directive.

== Climate ==
The region's climate is temperate-continental with Pontic climatic influences. The average annual temperature is high, at around 11°C, and rainfall is low, at 400–450 mm/year.

== Tourism ==
In the Danube Delta Biosphere Reserve, there is the "Grindul Lupilor" pasture, a marshy area covering approximately 800 ha (2,000 acres).The Sinoe Lagoon, Lake Golovița, and Zmeica Lagoon are also part of the Danube Delta Biosphere Reserve.

The main economic activities in the biosphere reserve are fishing, hunting, animal husbandry, subsistence agriculture, reed harvesting, as well as tourism. Since ancient times, fishing has been the main occupation of the inhabitants of the Danube Delta, and although today the fish supply has decreased and changed in quality, it continues to be a fundamental trade.

Roman fortification layout on Razelm's Insula Bisericuței
