= Ciucurova =

- Commune
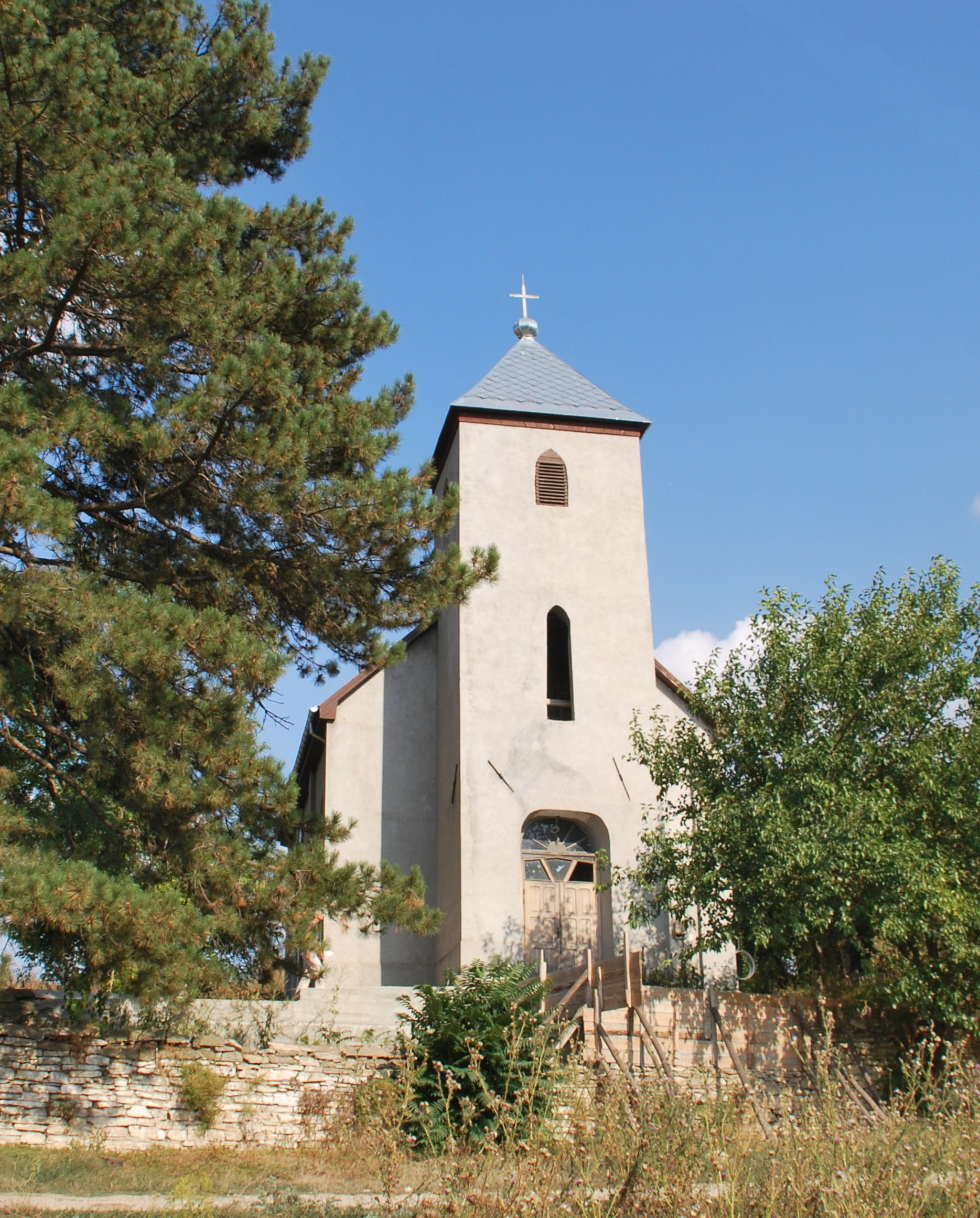
- Church in Atmagea

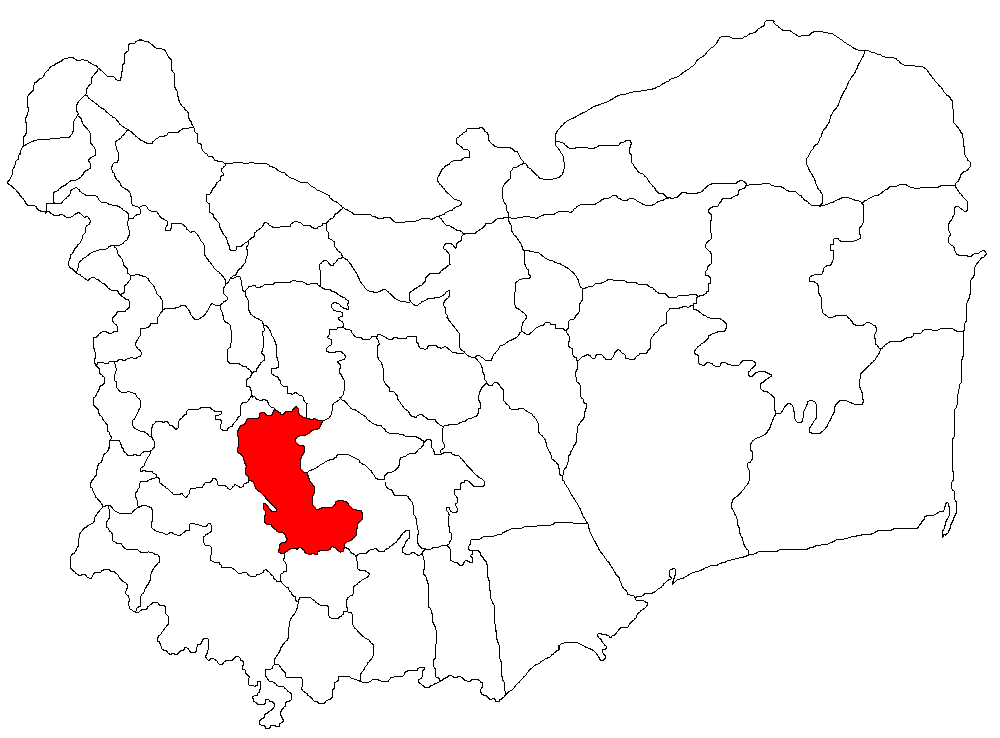
- Location in Tulcea County

- Location in Romania
- Coordinates: 44°56′N 28°29′E
- Country: Romania
- County: Tulcea
- Subdivisions: Ciucurova, Atmagea, Fântâna Mare

Government
  - Mayor (2024–2028): Marin Șerban (PNL)
- Area: 151.65 km^{2} (58.55 sq mi)
- Elevation: 137 m (449 ft)
- Population (2021-12-01): 1,725
  - Density: 11.37/km^{2} (29.46/sq mi)
- Time zone: UTC+02:00 (EET)
  - Summer (DST): UTC+03:00 (EEST)
- Postal code: 827055
- Area code: +40 x40
- Vehicle reg.: TL
- Website: www.primariaciucurova.ro

Ciucurova is a commune in Tulcea County, Northern Dobruja, Romania. It is composed of three villages: Atmagea, Ciucurova, and Fântâna Mare (historical name: Başpunar).

The commune's name comes from Turkish, Çukurova meaning low-plain (çukur - low, ova - plain).

Ciucurova is located in the southwestern part of Tulcea County, 47 km (29 mi) from the county seat, Tulcea. It is crossed by national road DN22d, which connects the town of Măcin, 50 km (31 mi) to the northwest, to the port city of Constanța, 106 km (66 mi) to the south.

At the 2021 census, the commune had a population of 1,725; of those, 62.14% were Romanians, 20,99% Roma, and 1.97% Turks.
