= Jurilovca =

Jurilovca Журиловка
- Commune
- Jurilovca viewed from Lake Golovița

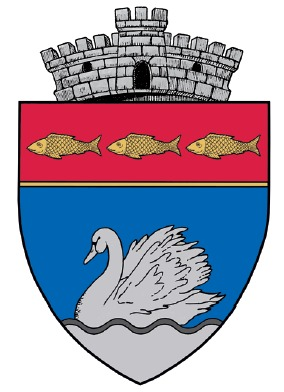
- Coat of arms

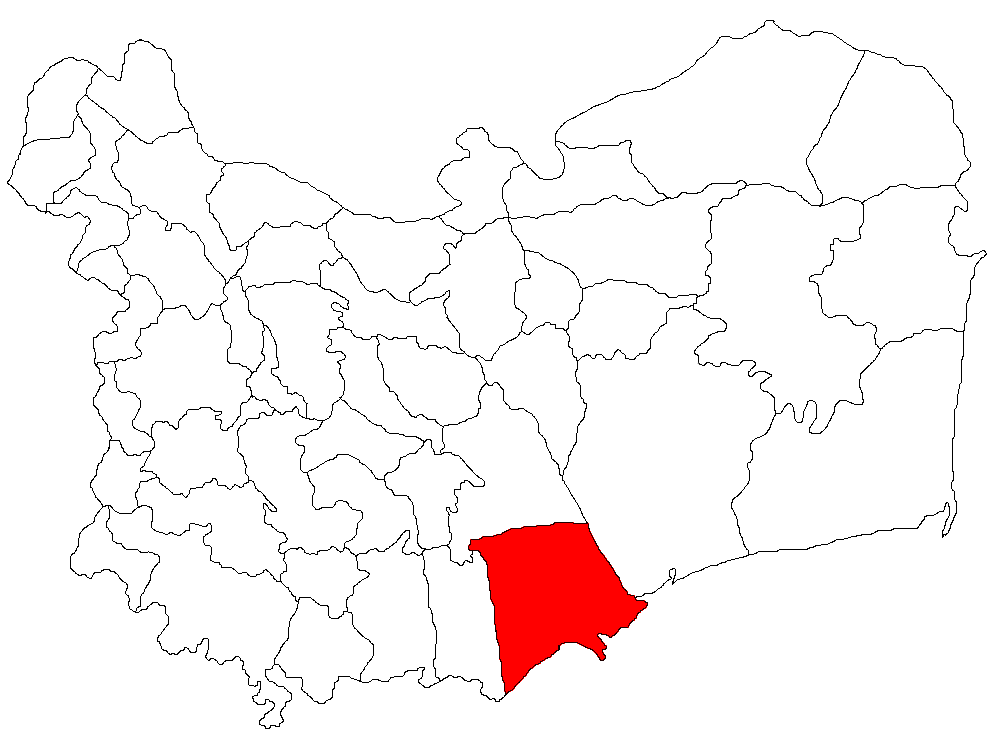
- Location in Tulcea County

- Location in Romania
- Coordinates: 44°46′N 28°52′E
- Country: Romania
- County: Tulcea
- Subdivisions: Jurilovca, Sălcioara, Vișina

Government
  - Mayor (2024–2028): Eugen Ion (PSD)
- Area: 299.87 km^{2} (115.78 sq mi)
- Elevation: 22 m (72 ft)
- Population (2021-12-01): 3,694
  - Density: 12.32/km^{2} (31.91/sq mi)
- Time zone: UTC+02:00 (EET)
  - Summer (DST): UTC+03:00 (EEST)
- Postal code: 827115
- Area code: +40 x40
- Vehicle reg.: TL
- Website: primariajurilovca.ro

Jurilovca (Russian: Журиловка; Unirea from 1983 to 1996) is a commune in Tulcea County, Northern Dobruja, Romania. It is composed of three villages: Jurilovca, Vișina, and Sălcioara (Caramanchioi until 1934; Vintilă Brătianu from 1934 to 1947; 6 Martie from 1947 to 1996).

It was founded by Lipovans at the beginning of the 19th century; the first documentary attestation is from 1826. Although at its beginnings it was a small village, the settlement grew and become, at the end of the 19th century, an important fishing centre in Danube Delta area. Nowadays it has the biggest community of fishermen in Romania, and it has the most modern fish processing factory in the country and Eastern Europe.

Jurilovca is also a tourist center. At about 15 km across the Lake Golovița is Gura Portiței, a beach resort at Black Sea. You can reach there by little vessel and by boat. Other tourist attractions are Argamum Citadel and Cape Doloșman. The entire area is a part of Danube Delta Biosphere Reservation.

== Demographics ==
At the 2011 census, Jurilovca had 3,935 inhabitants; 60.7% were Romanians and 38.8% Russian Lipovans. At the 2021 census, the commune had a population of 3,694; of those, 52.9% were Romanians and 39.66% Lipovans.

The Lipovans are Russians by ethnicity and Old Believers Orthodox by confession. This confession is the result of Nikonite Reform. In 1652, Nikon, the Patriarch of Russian Orthodox Church, initiated a religious reform which had in view adaptation of Russian Church at the rest of the Orthodox Churches, in fact a formal reform. The result was the division of Russian society in two: Nikonites, those who accepted the Reform, and Starovers (Old Believers), those who did not accept the Reform. The last ones, being chased, emigrated outside Russia, a part of them arriving on Romanian territory, north of Moldavia and Dobruja.

Historical population
Year	Pop.	±%
2002	5,184	—
2011	3,935	−24.1%
2021	3,694	−6.1%
Source: Census data

== Climate ==
Jurilovca has a cold semi-arid climate (BsK) according to the Köppen climate classification. The town has hot summers and mild winters with strong blizzards. It is one of the driest towns in Romania, averaging only 400mm of yearly precipitation.

Climate data for Jurilovca (altitude 38m, 2014–2026 normals, extremes 1981–present)
Month	Jan	Feb	Mar	Apr	May	Jun	Jul	Aug	Sep	Oct	Nov	Dec	Year
Record high °C (°F)	18.3 (64.9)	24.0 (75.2)	24.9 (76.8)	30.9 (87.6)	33.6 (92.5)	34.9 (94.8)	37.4 (99.3)	37.3 (99.1)	34.8 (94.6)	32.7 (90.9)	24.7 (76.5)	19.7 (67.5)	37.4 (99.3)
Mean daily maximum °C (°F)	4.9 (40.8)	6.8 (44.2)	10.8 (51.4)	15.7 (60.3)	21.2 (70.2)	26.9 (80.4)	29.3 (84.7)	29.5 (85.1)	24.6 (76.3)	17.8 (64.0)	11.6 (52.9)	7.1 (44.8)	17.2 (62.9)
Daily mean °C (°F)	1.5 (34.7)	3.3 (37.9)	6.6 (43.9)	11.0 (51.8)	16.3 (61.3)	21.8 (71.2)	24.2 (75.6)	24.5 (76.1)	19.8 (67.6)	13.5 (56.3)	8.3 (46.9)	3.9 (39.0)	12.9 (55.2)
Mean daily minimum °C (°F)	−1.9 (28.6)	−0.2 (31.6)	2.5 (36.5)	6.2 (43.2)	11.4 (52.5)	16.7 (62.1)	19.2 (66.6)	19.4 (66.9)	15.0 (59.0)	9.3 (48.7)	5.0 (41.0)	0.7 (33.3)	8.6 (47.5)
Record low °C (°F)	−19.3 (−2.7)	−17.8 (0.0)	−14.8 (5.4)	−3.2 (26.2)	3.0 (37.4)	8.1 (46.6)	11.0 (51.8)	8.0 (46.4)	4.1 (39.4)	−3.5 (25.7)	−10.8 (12.6)	−16.2 (2.8)	−19.3 (−2.7)
Average precipitation mm (inches)	34.5 (1.36)	28.8 (1.13)	23.9 (0.94)	37.5 (1.48)	29.4 (1.16)	48.1 (1.89)	28.6 (1.13)	22.7 (0.89)	31.1 (1.22)	49.6 (1.95)	62.2 (2.45)	32.1 (1.26)	428.5 (16.86)
Average precipitation days	4.8	4.4	4.2	5.1	5.7	4.1	3.5	2.2	2.5	4.1	5.8	5.7	52.1
Average snowy days	5.0	3.6	1.5	1.8	0	0	0	0	0	0	0.5	1.4	13.8
Source: Meteomanz; Infoclimat

== See also ==
- Argamum (castra)

== Natives ==
- Petre Ceapura (born 1942), rower
- Gheorghe Danielov (1948–2017), sprint canoeist
- Vasile Dîba (1954–2024), sprint canoeist
