= Beidaud =

- Commune
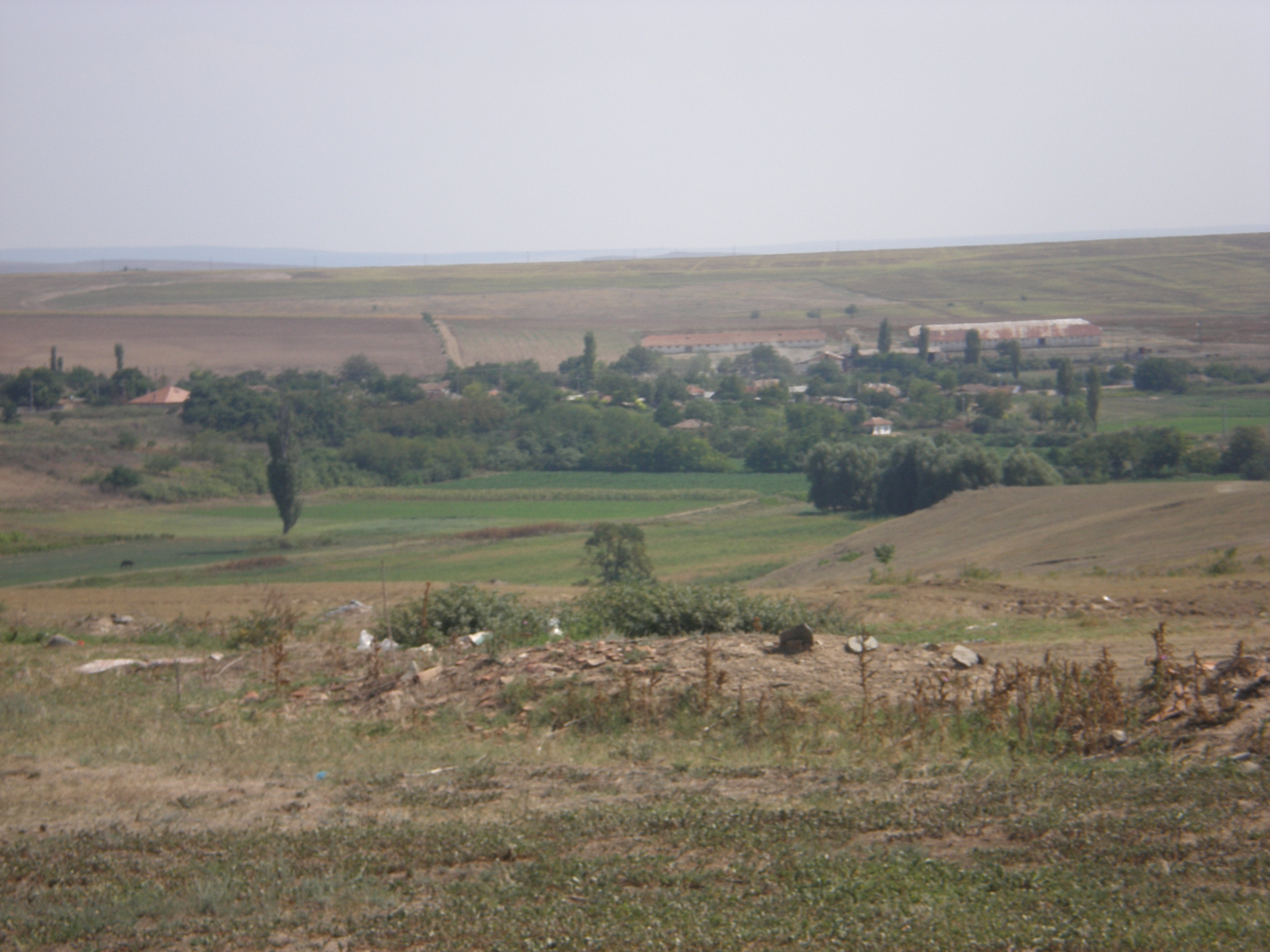

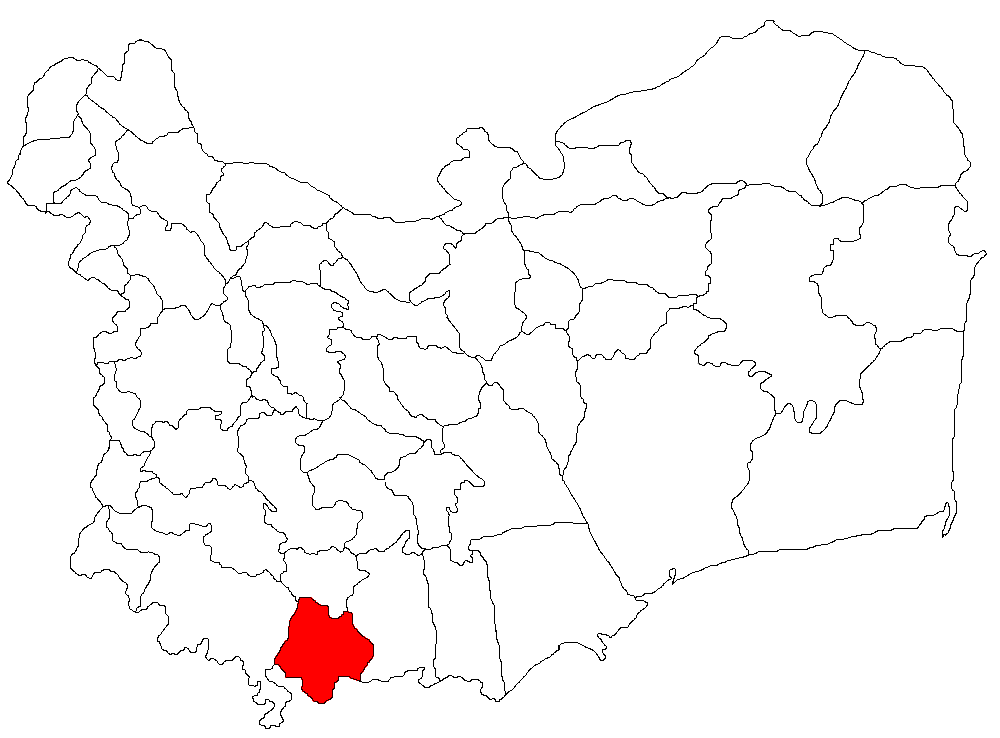
- Location in Tulcea County

- Location in Romania
- Coordinates: 44°43′N 28°34′E
- Country: Romania
- County: Tulcea
- Subdivisions: Beidaud, Neatârnarea, Sarighiol de Deal

Government
  - Mayor (2020–2024): Mihai Culina (PSD)
- Area: 127.99 km^{2} (49.42 sq mi)
- Elevation: 80 m (260 ft)
- Population (2021-12-01): 1,599
  - Density: 12.49/km^{2} (32.36/sq mi)
- Time zone: UTC+02:00 (EET)
  - Summer (DST): UTC+03:00 (EEST)
- Postal code: 827010
- Area code: +40 x40
- Vehicle reg.: TL
- Website: www.primariabeidaud.ro

Beidaud (Romanian pronunciation: [bejdaˈud]) is a commune in Tulcea County, Northern Dobruja, Romania. The commune includes three villages: Beidaud, Neatârnarea (Caildere until 1908), and Sarighiol de Deal.

The commune's name is of Turkish origin, being a compound of the words bey and Daut, derived from David. Thus, the name means "village of the bey David".
