= Ceamurlia de Jos =

- Commune
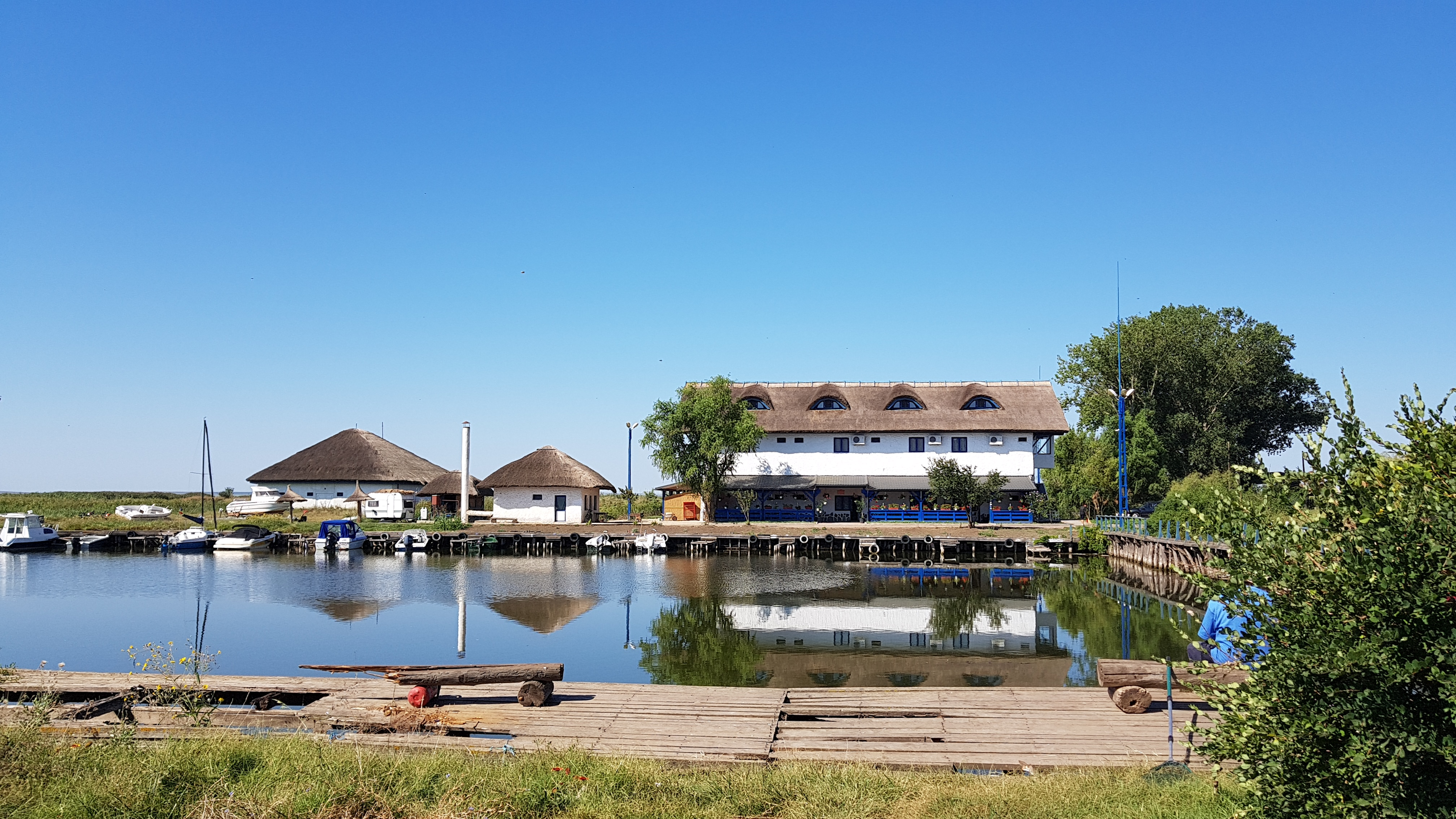

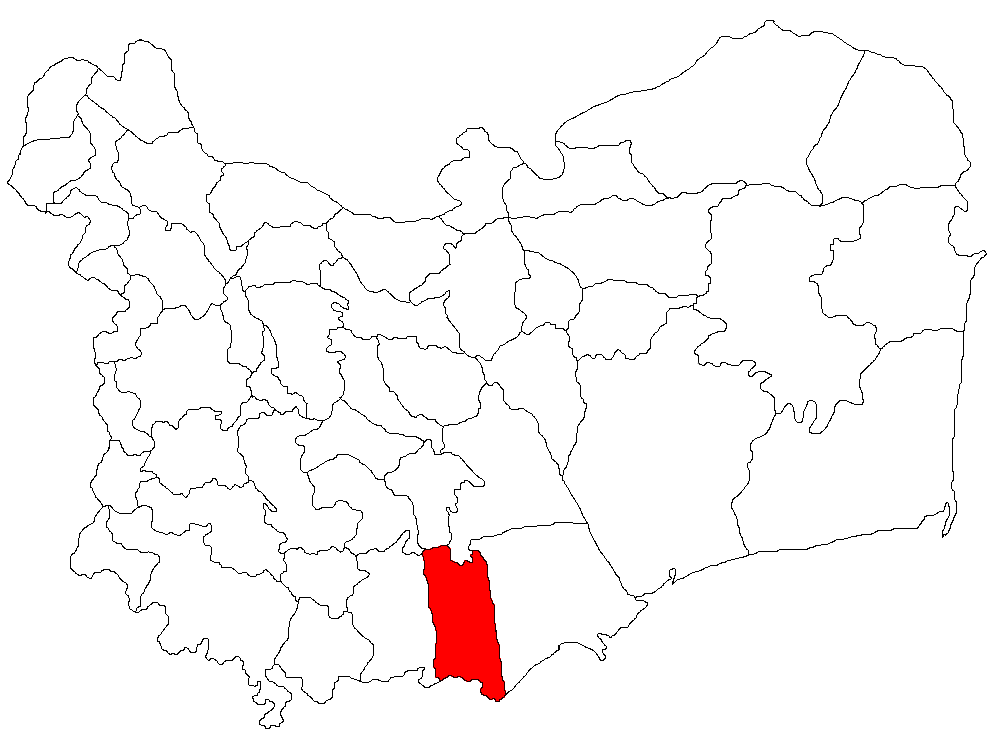
- Location in Tulcea County

- Location in Romania
- Coordinates: 44°44′N 28°43′E
- Country: Romania
- County: Tulcea
- Subdivisions: Ceamurlia de Jos, Lunca

Government
  - Mayor (2024–2028): Dumitru Stan (PSD)
- Area: 119.43 km^{2} (46.11 sq mi)
- Elevation: 6 m (20 ft)
- Population (2021-12-01): 2,122
  - Density: 17.77/km^{2} (46.02/sq mi)
- Time zone: UTC+02:00 (EET)
  - Summer (DST): UTC+03:00 (EEST)
- Postal code: 827035
- Area code: +40 x40
- Vehicle reg.: TL
- Website: www.primariaceamurliadejos.ro

Ceamurlia de Jos (Romanian pronunciation: [t͡ʃe̯amurˈli.a de ʒos]; meaning "Lower Ceamurlia") is a commune in the southeast of Tulcea County, Northern Dobruja, Romania. It has a total population of 2,620 and it has an area of 119,43 km². The Golovița Lake is located south of this commune. Its name is derived from Turkish Çamurlu, meaning "muddy".

A part of the inhabitants of this commune are Aromanians that were deported from Southern Dobruja, where they settled from the Southern Balkans during the Romanian rule of the region, after it was ceded back to Bulgaria in 1940 according to the terms of the Treaty of Craiova.

At the 2021 census Ceamurlia de Jos had a population of 2,122 with a majority of Romanians (92.37%) and a minority of Bulgarians (0.51%), others (0.19%) and unknown (6.93%).

Ceamurlia de Jos commune is composed of two villages:

- Ceamurlia de Jos, with a population of 1,258 and an area of 1,69 km²
- Lunca, with a population of 1,362 and an area of 1,66 km², located 4 km east of the Ceamurlia de Jos village.

Ceamurlia de Jos was the place where the H5N1 strain of the avian influenza was found for the first time in Europe, being brought by migrating birds from Asia that passed through the nearby Danube Delta.
