= Lake Golovița =

- Lacul Golovița (Romanian)
- Map showing the location of Lake Golovița within Tulcea County, Romania

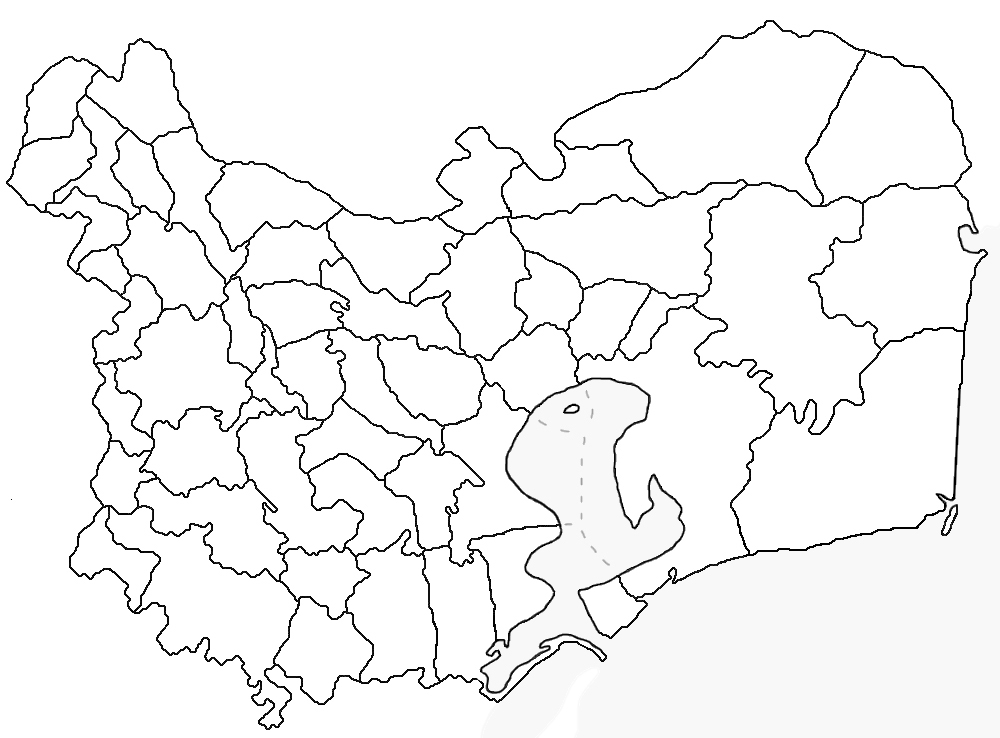
- Location of Lake Golovița in Romania Lake Golovița (Romania)
- Location: Tulcea County, Romania
- Coordinates: 44°42′51″N 28°46′36″E
- Type: Freshwater Lagoon
- Basin countries: Romania
- Max. length: 7.2 kilometres (4.5 mi)
- Max. width: 18 kilometres (11 mi)
- Surface area: 7,500 hectares (29 sq mi)
- Residence time: 300–600 days
- Settlements: Lunca, Jurilovca

Lake Golovița is part of a complex of lagoons on Romania's Black Sea coast. It is connected to the larger Lake Razelm on the north by a channel 3.1 kilometres (1.9 mi) wide, to Lake Zmeica on the south by three narrow channels, and separated from the Black Sea's salt water by a narrow spit of sand no more than 46 metres (151 ft) wide at some points along its eastern margin. This closure was completed artificially in the 1970s, and has caused the lagoon to lose all salinity, increase renewal times to over a year, and develop eutrophication. It is part of the Danube Delta Biosphere Reserve.

Because of their wide connection, Golovița is often subsumed under Lake Razelm in official documents. The Lake Razelm/Golovița complex is the largest lake in Romania.
