= U.S. Army Garrison Black Sea =

United States Army Garrison Black Sea
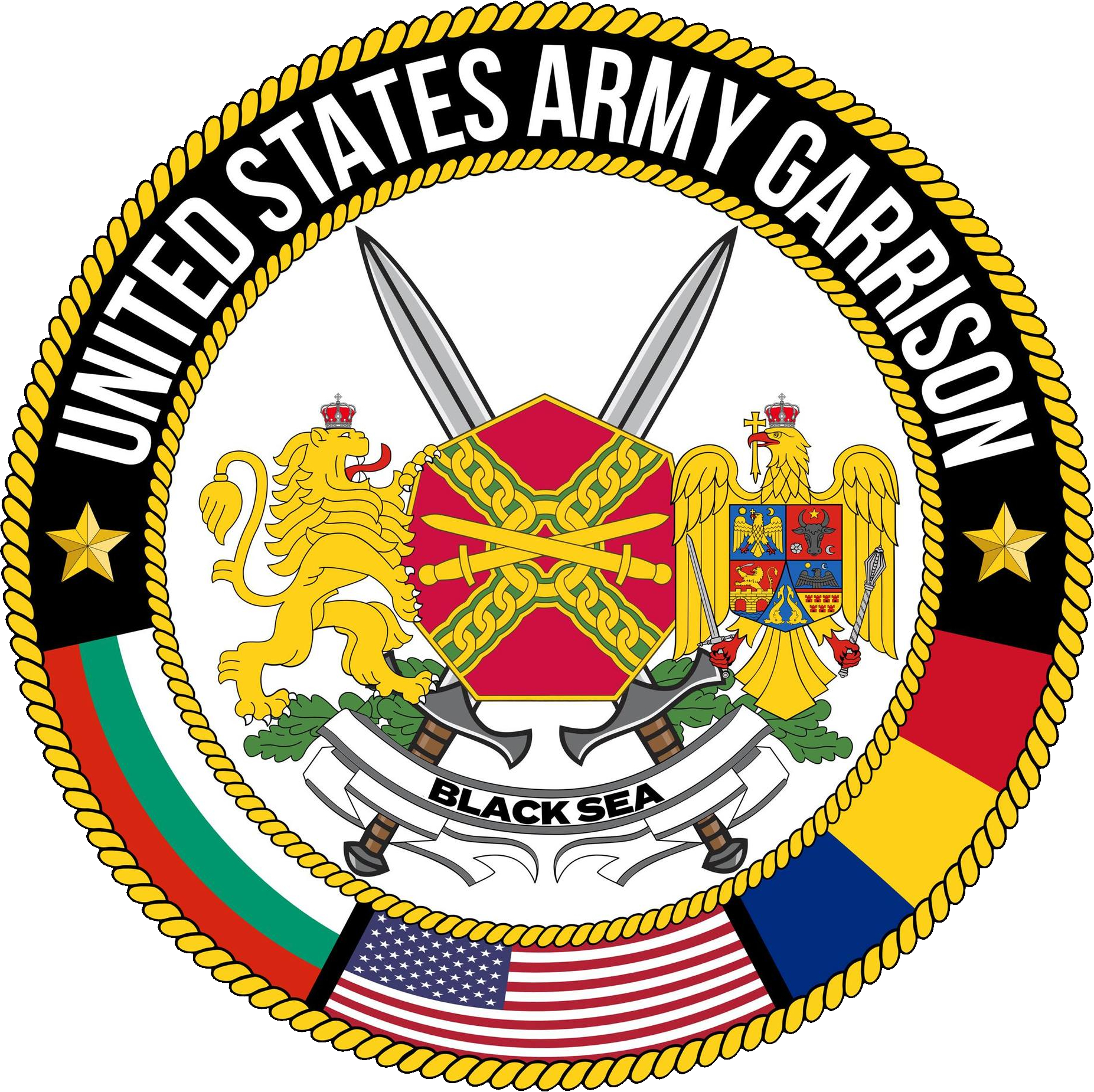
- Army Garrison Black Sea logo
- Country: Romania; Bulgaria
- Allegiance: United States
- Branch: United States Army
- Part of: United States Army Europe, United States Army Installation Management Command
- Garrison/HQ: Mihail Kogălniceanu Air Base, Romania; Novo Selo Range, Bulgaria
- Website: home.army.mil/blacksea

Commanders
- Current Commander: LTC Jeffery Fritz
- Command Sergeant Major: CSM Nathan Hunsaker

United States Army Garrison Black Sea (USAG Black Sea) is a United States Army garrison of the Installation Management Command (IMCOM) located at the Mihail Kogălniceanu Air Base (MKAB) in Romania and Novo Selo Training Area (NSTA) in Bulgaria. USAG Black Sea also manages several other sites across the two countries, including the Babadag Training Area in Romania, and the Aytos and Chubra Training Areas in Bulgaria.

USAG Black Sea delivers garrison services and enables readiness of permanent, rotational, allied and expeditionary forces in Romania and Bulgaria. Its task is to support and secure the total force community, enabling power projection in the area of operations (AO) Victory South for V Corps. U.S. Army Garrison Black Sea is the furthest east US Army installation in Europe and is a pivotal location for the US National Security Strategy.

== History ==
U.S. Army Garrison Black Sea was established on 15 June 2024 as the US Army's 9th garrison in Europe and the 81st overall, being the first American garrison in Romania and Bulgaria. USAG Black Sea was preceded by the Army Support Activity Black Sea (ASA-Black Sea) which was established in 2016 after IMCOM took over the responsibility for the quality of life and infrastructure services from Area Support Group Black Sea, an organization under the command of the 21st Theater Sustainment Command.

Initially, ASA-Black Sea was under the headquarters of USAG Ansbach and was later moved under USAG Rheinland-Pfalz. In May 2024, before the establishment of USAG Black Sea, the USAG Poland's area of responsibility was expanded to include both Romania and Bulgaria, thus uniting the "Army's Home on the Eastern Flank".

The mission of Army Support Activity Black Sea was to deliver base operations support, logistics, and administrative services to enhance US military activities in the area. It also managed and maintained facilities and improved infrastructure, while working closely with the host nation military and civilian authorities to facilitate cooperation.

== Facilities ==
=== Mihail Kogălniceanu Air Base ===
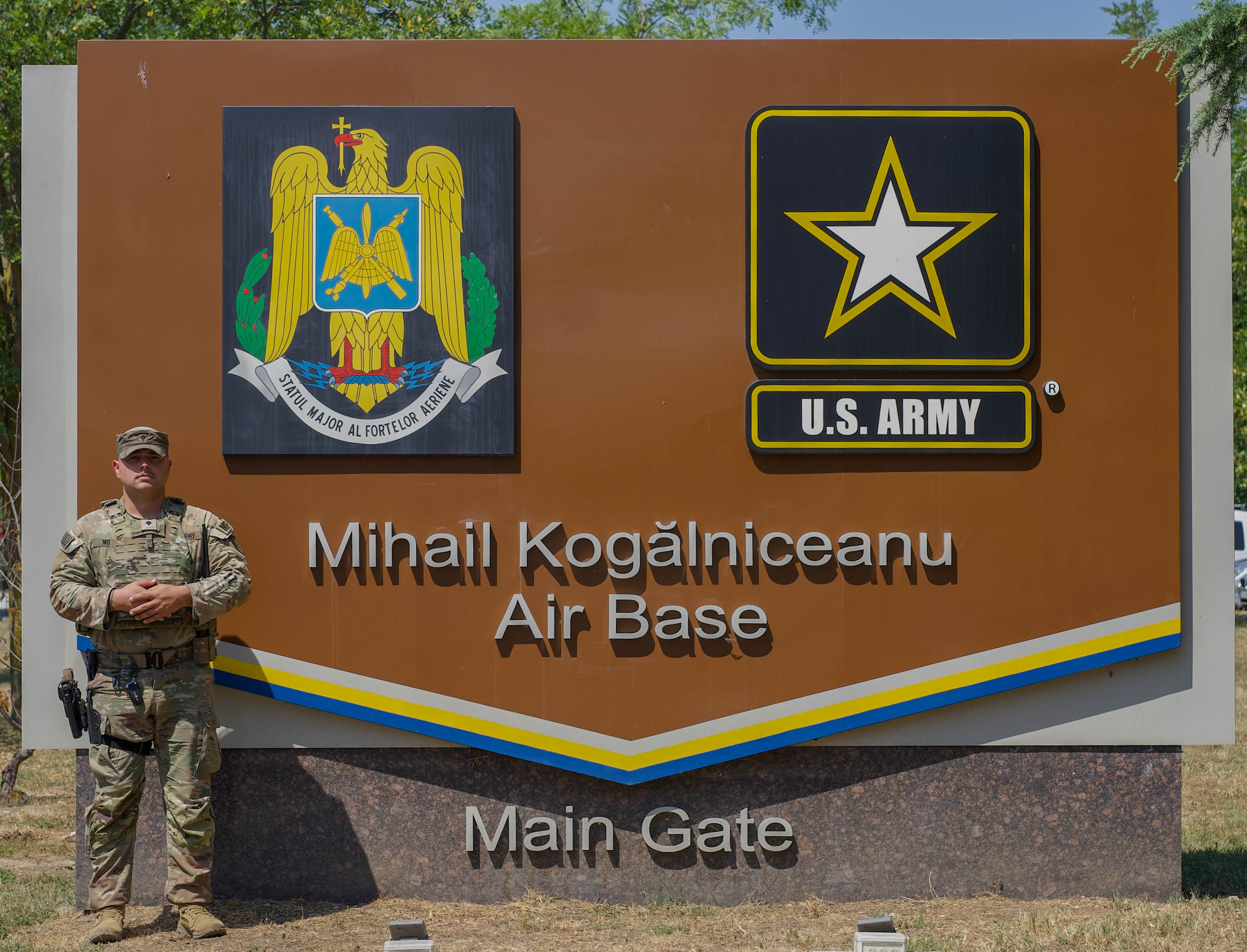
MKAB main gate sign

Mihail Kogălniceanu Air Base (MKAB) has been used by the U.S. Department of Defense since 1999. During the U.S. phase of the Iraq War from 2003 to 2010, MKAB was one of four Romanian military facilities utilized as a staging area by US military forces. The MK Air Base also became one of the main operating bases of United States Army Europe's Task Force East. After construction works were completed on the new United States Army base on the site of the former 34th Territorial Mechanized Brigade garrison, the United States began operating a Permanent Forward Operating Site. By that point, the United States had spent $48 million on upgrading the base.

In 2014, MKAB was used as a stopover for military deployments to Afghanistan and other locations after the closure of the Transit Center at Manas. The United States Army 21st Theater Sustainment Command and Air Force 780th Expeditionary Airlift Squadron were responsible for US operations at that time.

Currently, MK Air Base supports the NATO Enhanced Air Policing missions, multiple rotary-wing elements from the current Regionally Aligned Forces rotation force Mechanized Infantry Battalion and other support elements. The Senior Responsible Role is assigned to the V Corps and division-sized elements are located at the base. In 2022, after the Russian invasion of Ukraine, the French-led Battle Group was established at the base, before moving to Cincu. The Battle Group continues to maintain a presence at the base.

The infrastructure includes barracks, DFAC and MWR facilities, an Aid Station as well as a Fire & MP Station, a Troop Medical Center, a gym and a post exchange facility. The 3,500 m (11,500 ft) airfield runway can accommodate rotary-wing through C-5 aircraft. The base has a rail connection with side-loading ramps. Training facilities have company-size maneuver training capabilities and include live-fire shooting ranges for MPMG, Sniper, and Combat Pistol Qualification Course (CPQC).

As of 2024, the Mihail Kogălniceanu Air Base is going through major upgrade and expansion works. Under a 2 billion euro project launched by the Romanian Armed Forces, the base will become the largest air base in Europe, and will include a military town similar to Ramstein Air Base. It will be capable of hosting more than 10,000 NATO servicemen permanently, with another 10,000 stationed for temporary deployments.

=== Novo Selo Training Area ===
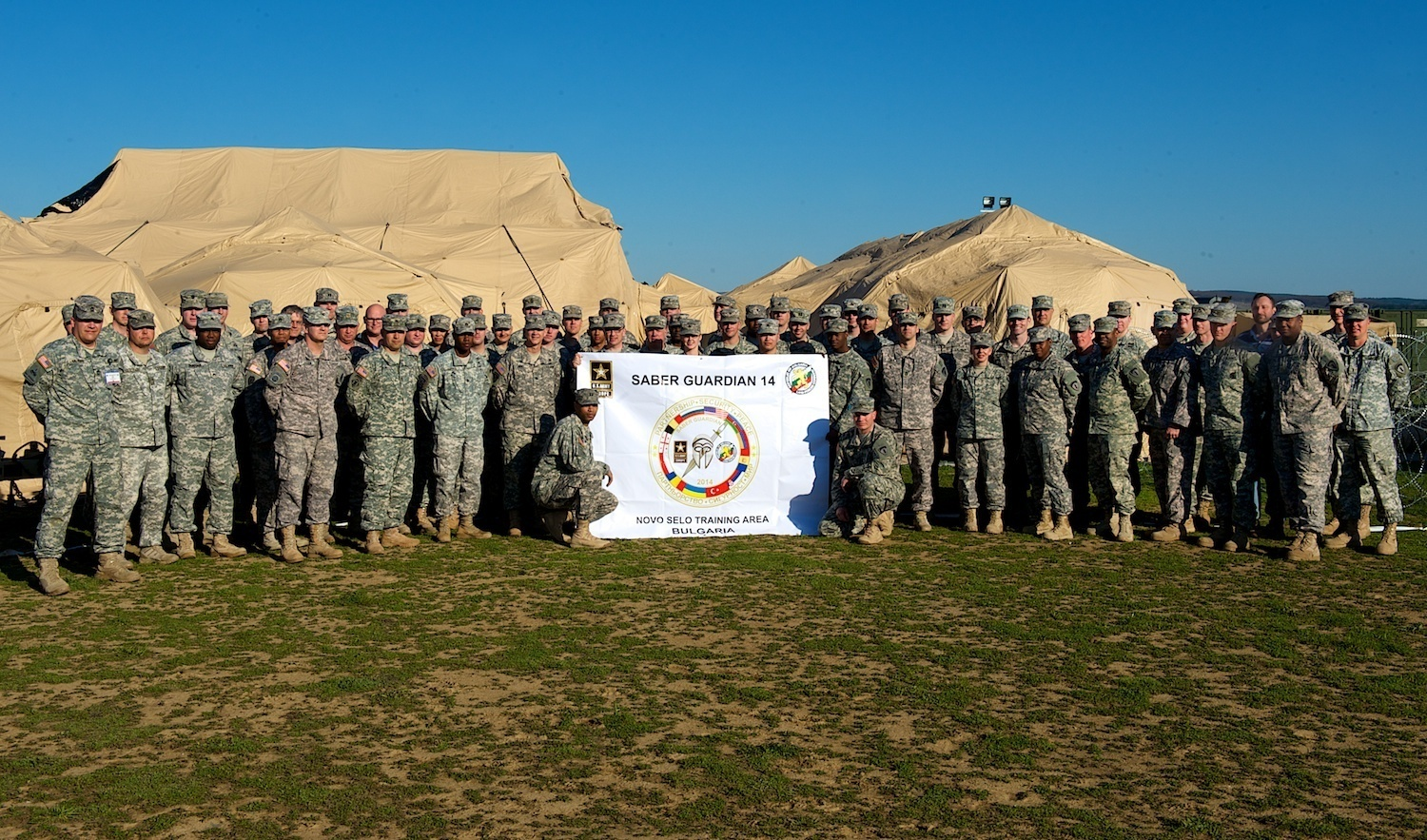
Contingency Command Post Company at NSTA during Saber Guardian 2014

Novo Selo Training Area (NSTA) has been used for joint American and Bulgarian exercises since Bulgaria joined NATO in 2004. Following the signing of the Defense Cooperation Agreement between the United States and Bulgaria, the base was used as one of the Bulgarian–American Joint Military Facilities. Starting from 2008, the US Army began investing in new infrastructure and soldier housing at the base.

The Department of Defense invested more than $80 million in a wide variety of base upgrades and other improvements. The current base has designated sectors for tank shooting, CBRN defense and reconnaissance training. Other facilities include an Aid Station, barracks, billeting, DFAC, Fire & MP Station, fuel points, MWR, and a post exchange. The base also has a helipad with up to 5 additional landing zones on or near the training area and a parking apron for up to five aircraft. It also has a rail connection with side-loading ramps. Novo Selo can support live-fire and maneuver exercise of Bradley, Abrams, and Stryker crews as well as light infantry teams up to company level.

There are no permanent units housed at Novo Selo Range, as according to the 2006 agreement, the soldiers deployed to Novo Selo must stay for limited periods of time. The base is used for short-term training sessions.

=== Other facilities ===
Other facilities managed by the United States Army Garrison Black Sea include the Babadag Training Area in Romania, as well as the Aytos and Chubra Training Areas in Bulgaria.

== Commanders ==
LTC Brian Fiddermon unfurling the USAG Black Sea colors during a change of command ceremony in 2024

- LTC Jeffery M. Fritz July 2026 – present
- LTC Christopher P. Kuszniaj August 2024 – July 2026
- LTC Brian C. Fiddermon June 2024 – August 2024

== See also ==
- U.S. Army Garrison Bavaria
- Camp Kościuszko
- U.S. Army Garrison Vicenza
