= RoAF 57th Air Base =

Air base in Romania

RoAF 57th Air Base
- Baza 57 Aeriană "Căpitan Aviator Constantin Cantacuzino"
- Mihail Kogălniceanu, Constanța County; Near Constanța in Romania
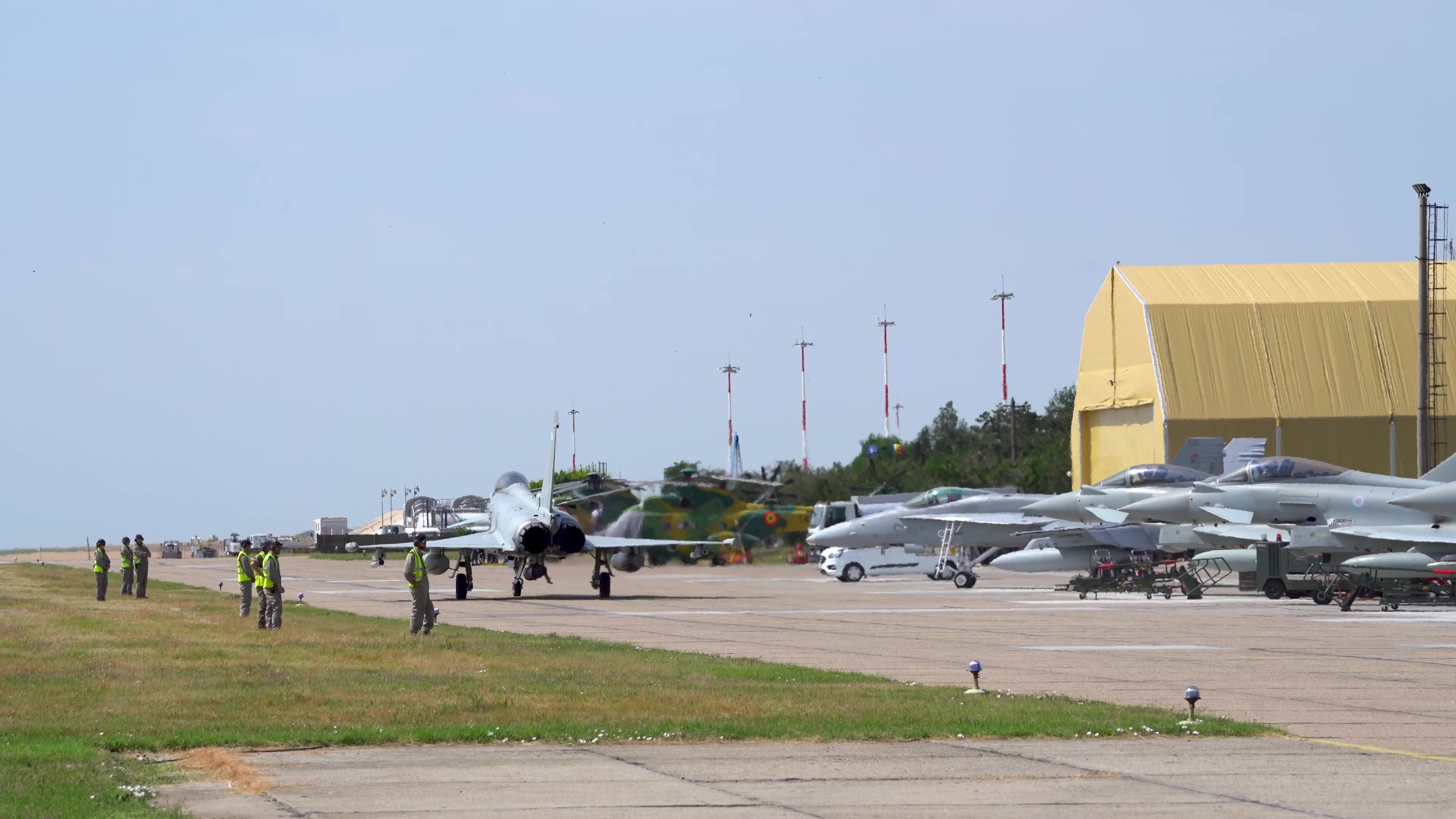
- British and Finnish fighter jets prepare to scramble during exercise Ramstein Legacy 2024

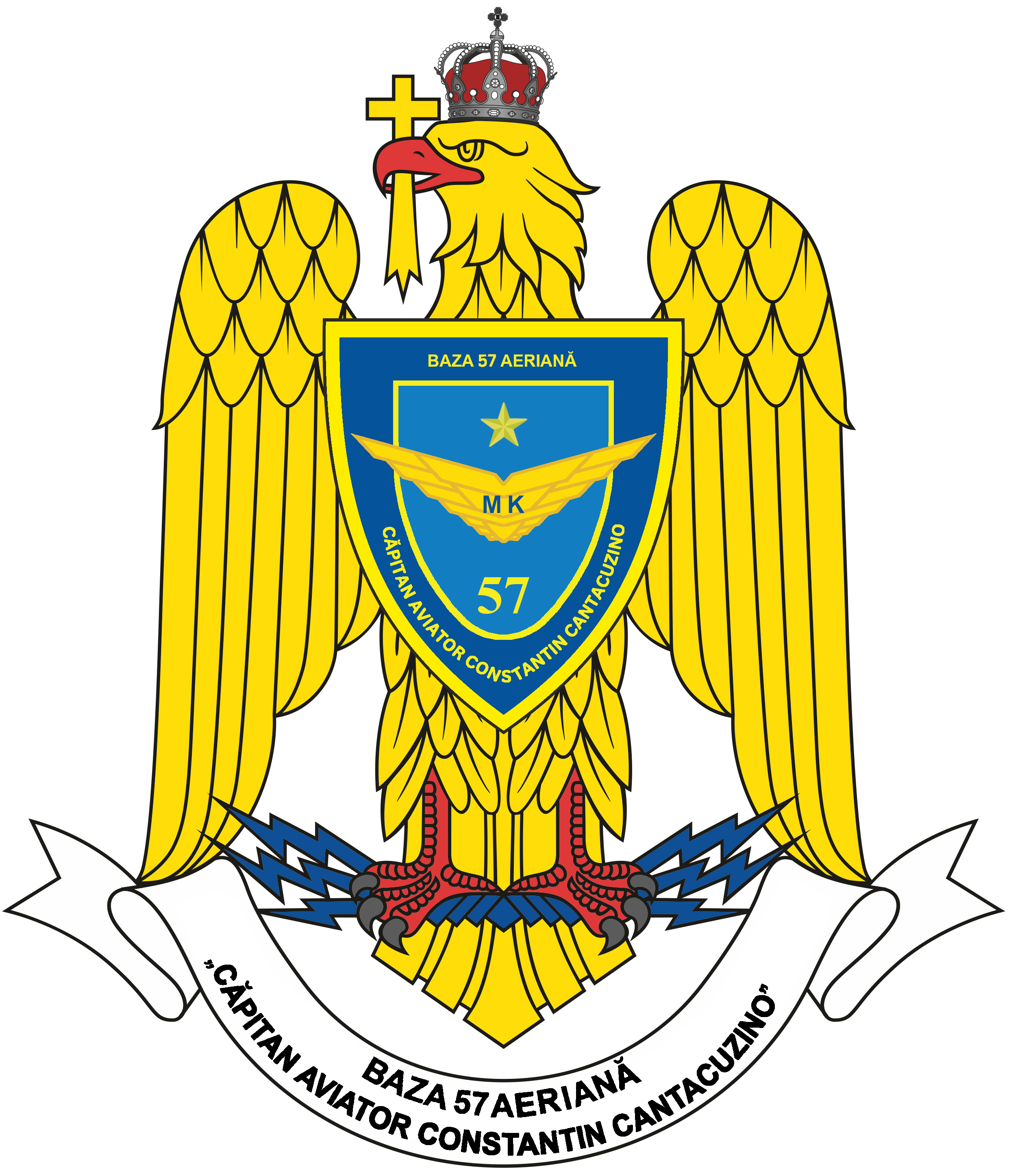
- Coat of arms of the 57th Air Base

Site information
- Owner: Ministry of National Defence
- Operator: Romanian Air Force; United States Army

Location
- Location within Romania Location within Europe
- Coordinates: 44°21′46.79″N 28°29′13.19″E

Site history
- Built: 1955
- In use: 1955–present

Garrison information
- Current commander: Comandor Gabriel Goagă
- Occupants: 572nd Helicopter Squadron

Airfield information
- Identifiers: IATA: CND, ICAO: LRCK
- Elevation: 107 metres (351 ft) AMSL
Runways
Direction	Length and surface
18/36	3,500 metres (11,483 ft) Concrete

The 57th Air Base "Captain Aviator Constantin Cantacuzino" (Romanian: Baza 57 Aeriană "Căpitan Aviator Constantin Cantacuzino"), also known as Mihail Kogălniceanu Air Base, is a Romanian Air Force base located near Constanța, at the Mihail Kogălniceanu International Airport. It is home to the 572nd Helicopter Squadron, while the 58th Fighter Squadron is forming at Câmpia Turzii until the base improvements are completed. The air base also has a significant US military presence, being the location of the US Army Garrison Black Sea and Area Support Group Black Sea, hosting 700 US troops.

In 2024, construction began on a project aimed at modernizing and expanding the base. Under the same project, it is planned to build a military city similar to Ramstein Air Base, where more than 10,000 NATO servicemen will live together with their families, although this number could be doubled to 20,000 soldiers of which half would be stationed permanently and half on temporary deployments.

The current base commander is Comandor Gabriel Goagă.

== History ==
=== Cold War era ===
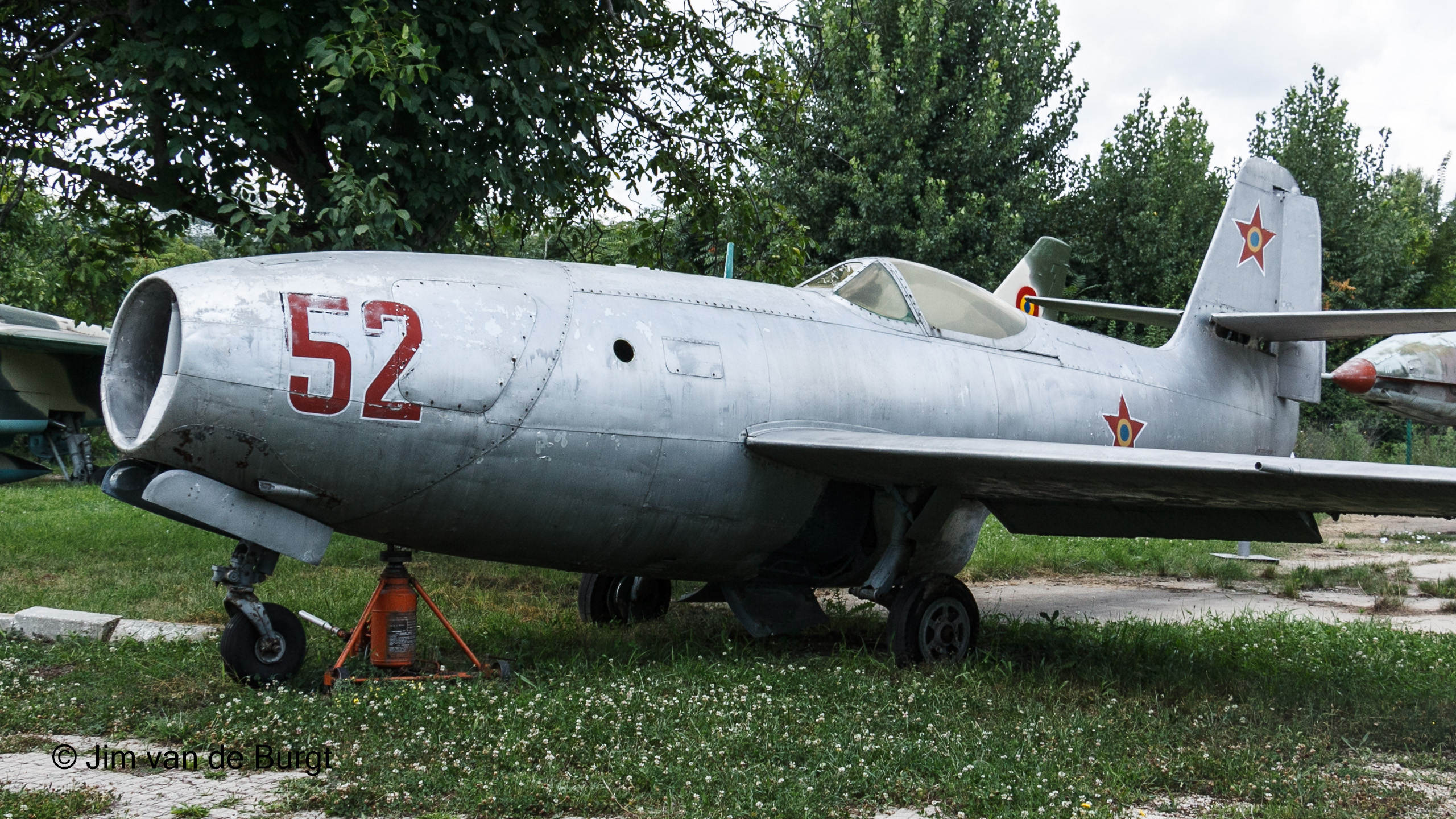
A Romanian Yak-23 fighter

The 57th Air Base was first formed as Regimentul 14 Aviație Vânătoare Reactivă, soon to be renamed to Regimentul 172 Aviație Vânătoare, on 15 April 1951 at the Pipera Aerodrome. It was equipped with Po-2, Yak-11, Yak-23 and Yak-17 aircraft.

The fighter regiment moved to the Mihail Kogălniceanu Aerodrome in 1955, following the escape by seaplane of two aviators from Escadrila 131 Hidroaviație Palazu Mare. On 1 November 1959, it was renamed to Regimentul 57 Aviație Vânătoare (57th Fighter Aviation Regiment). The name was kept until 1995. The base received MiG-17 fighters in 1960, followed by MiG-21F-13s in 1962. By 1972, the base was equipped only with MiG-21 fighters.

In 1979, the first MiG-23s arrived at the base. These equipped the 1st Squadron of the Regiment. The 2nd Squadron converted to the MiG-23 in 1980. From 1989, the Regiment started receiving MiG-29s. The MiG-29s were assigned to the 2nd and 3rd Squadrons of the Regiment.

=== Post-1990 ===
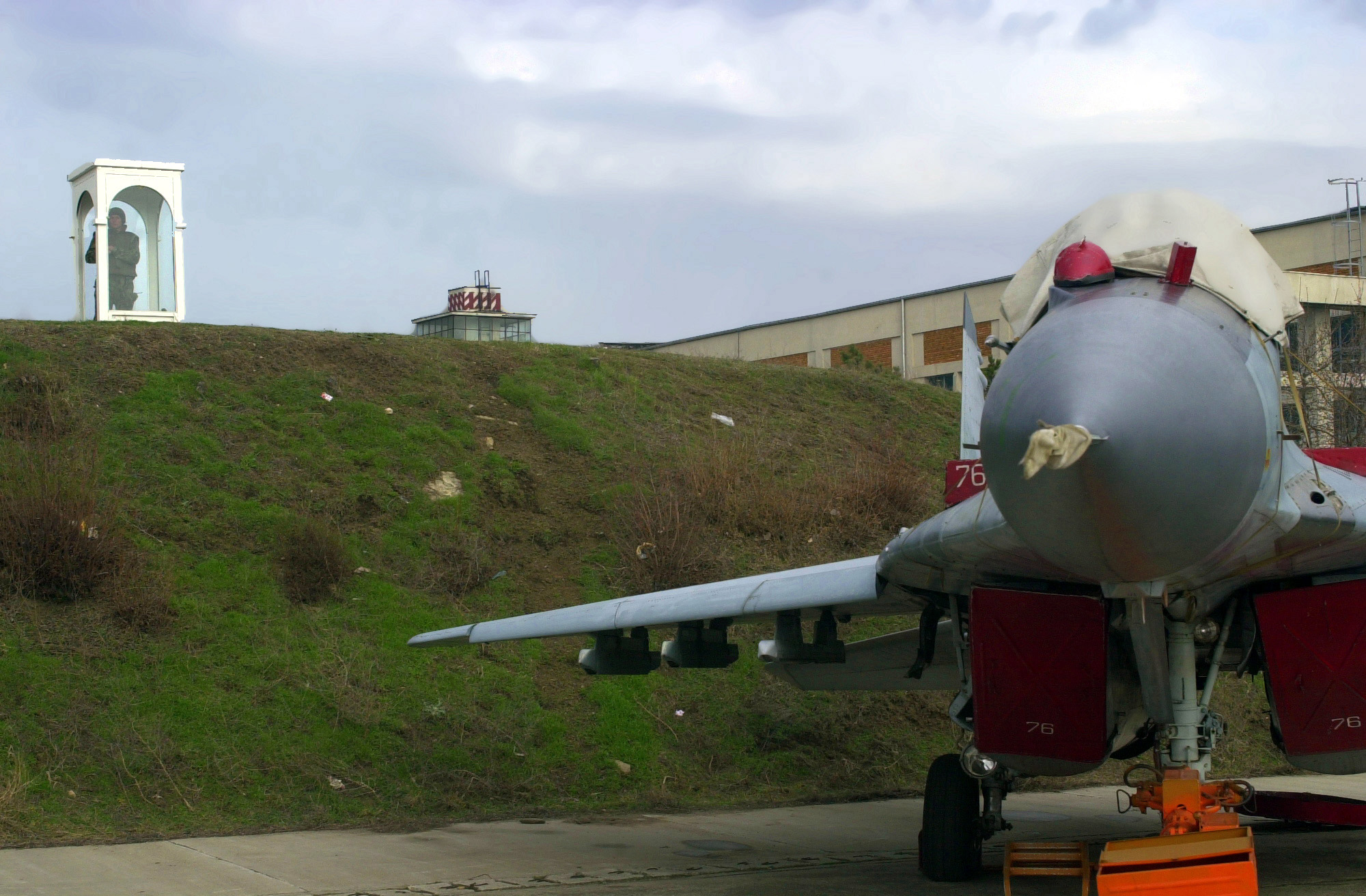
A MiG-29 parked at the base

In July 1995, the 57th Fighter Aviation Regiment was disbanded and replaced by the 57th Air Base, with the 57th Fighter Aviation Group. The group had two MiG-29 squadrons and one MiG-23 squadron. In 2002, the 59th Helicopter Regiment from Tuzla was disbanded and its personnel and equipment were integrated into the 57th Fighter Aviation Group.

Parts of the U.S. Department of Defense, principally from United States European Command, started to use the base in 1999. The airport and the former military garrison of the 34th Territorial Mechanized Brigade became the first US base to open in Romania. In 2003, it became one of four Romanian military facilities that U.S. military forces have used as a staging area for the invasion of, and counter-insurgency efforts in Iraq, operated by the 458th Air Expeditionary Group. During the first three months of the 2003 invasion of Iraq, the airport was transited by 1,300 cargo and personnel transports towards Iraq, comprising 6,200 personnel and about 11,100 tons of equipment. The base retains an important role, given added weight by the annexation of Crimea by the Russian Federation.

The base was disbanded in April 2004, following the retirement of the MiG-29s, becoming an annex to the 86th Air Base. All the MiG-29s remain in open storage at the base. The 863rd Helicopter Squadron remained the only permanent unit of the base. Before it was disbanded, the base also received MiG-21 LanceR fighters with personnel from the 86th Air Base. Until the retiring of the LanceRs in 2023, the base hosted the 861st Fighter Squadron of the 86th Air Base. In 2006, the MiGs from Mihail Kogalniceanu took part the Viper Lance 2006 exercise together with F-16 Fighting Falcons of the 22nd Fighter Squadron which were deployed at the base for the duration of the exercise. This was also the first time American F-16 crews trained in Romania.

On 1 May 2007, the Mihail Kogălniceanu aerodrome was established, with the mission to coordinate the aeronautical activities in the area of responsibility, to ensure the Support of the Host Nation for the armed forces in transit, and to represent the interface between the foreign armed forces that carried out activities on the aerodrome and the public authorities represented locally. On 1 June, the Administrative Center-Mihail Kogălniceanu Airport (Military Unit 01837) was established and took responsibility of the location. In January 2014, Mihail Kogălniceanu Aerodrome changed its organizational structure by assimilating the Mihail Kogălniceanu Administrative Center subordinated to the General Staff of the Land Forces.

In 2007 and 2011, the air base hosted the USAF Thunderbirds during the air shows that took place at the airport. With the closure of the Transit Center at Manas in Kyrgyzstan, the United States military transferred processing operations for military deploying to Afghanistan and other locations to the base. The United States Army 21st Theater Sustainment Command and Air Force 780th Expeditionary Airlift Squadron were responsible for US operations there.

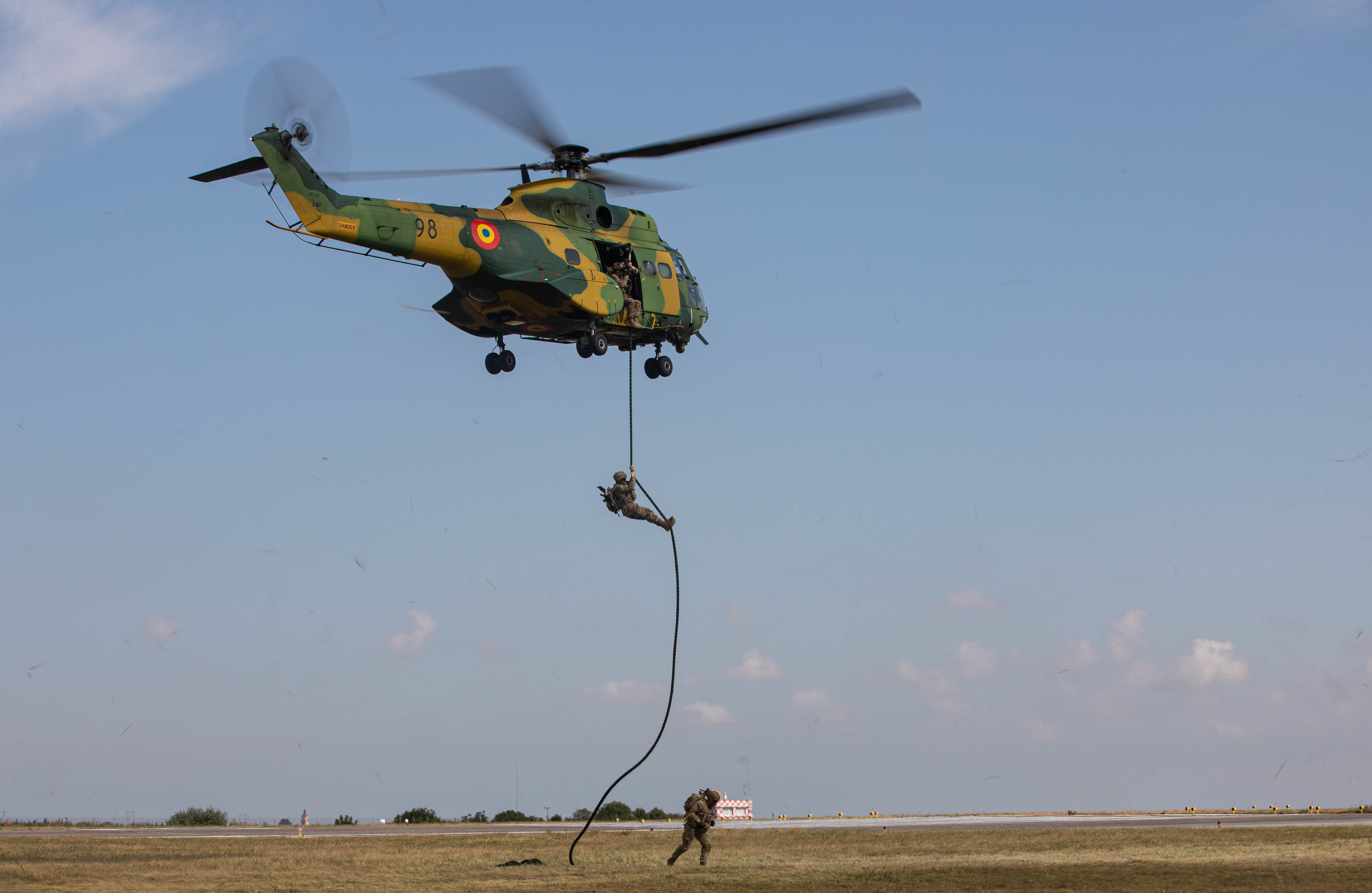
An IAR 330 of the 572nd Helicopter Squadron unloads troops of the 502nd Infantry Regiment, 101st Airborne by fast rope

In July 2018, during the restructuring and modernization of the Romanian Army, the 57th Air Base was re-established and placed under the command of the Air Force Staff.

In October 2019, a detachment of 4 IAR 330L helicopters from the 572nd Helicopter Squadron was sent to participate in the UN mission to Mali. The Carpathian Pumas detachment carried out medical evacuation missions, transport of troops and materials, air patrols, and observation missions. The detachment completed 380 missions until 2020. During the deployment, one helicopter was damaged by a storm while refueling at the UN base in Douentza.

Several unidentified unmanned aerial vehicles were detected flying close to the base in April 2024. The drones, determined to be small civilian types, were subsequently brought down with electronic warfare equipment, although no remains were found. The military prosecutor's office started an investigation following the events. Similar events also occurred over other Romanian air bases since 2022.

On the occasion of Her Majesty Margareta, Custodian of the Romanian Crown and Prince Radu's visit to the base on 17 May 2024, it was announced that the 57th Air Base received the name "Captain Aviator Constantin Cantacuzino", in honor of Romania's top scoring ace of World War II, Prince Constantin "Bâzu" Cantacuzino. The 57th Fighter Aviation Group previously held this honorific name from its establishment in 1995 until the disbanding of the 57th Air Base in 2004.

In January 2025, the base was targeted by fake news spread by far-right politician Călin Georgescu. Georgescu claimed that the base was going to be used to launch an attack on Russia and start World War III before the inauguration of Donald Trump on 20 January. Such news were dismissed by the Romanian Ministry of National Defence and by James C. O'Brien, the Assistant Secretary of State for European and Eurasian Affairs.

Starting from May 2025, the 58th Fighter Squadron which is to be based at Mihail Kogălniceanu began forming at the 71st Air Base from Câmpia Turzii. The 58th is to remain there until the base upgrades are completed at Mihail Kogălniceanu.

It has been suggested that the base would play a significant role in supporting the peacekeeping effort in Ukraine. Since Prime Minister Ilie Bolojan has stated that Romania is ready to offer its military infrastructure for securing peace in Ukraine and as one of the largest air bases in Eastern Europe, Mihail Kogălniceanu could accommodate heavy transport and tanker aircraft of the United States such as the C-5 Galaxy or the KC-135 Stratotanker, providing the logistical foundation of a US-backed mission.

On 11 March 2026, the Supreme Council of National Defense (CSAT) and the Parliament of Romania approved the US request for deploying aerial refueling airplanes, monitoring equipment and satellite communications systems, as well as additional military personnel for security and maintenance at the base. Other assets will also be deployed at the Câmpia Turzii and Deveselu bases. The temporary deployment will support the US military operations against Iran. According to minister Radu Miruță, up to 15 tankers will be stationed in Romania. The first aircraft arrived on 15 March at the Otopeni Air Base and began flying their first missions on 20 March. The first tankers arrived at Mihail Kogălniceanu from Ramstein in June 2026.

== Expansion project ==
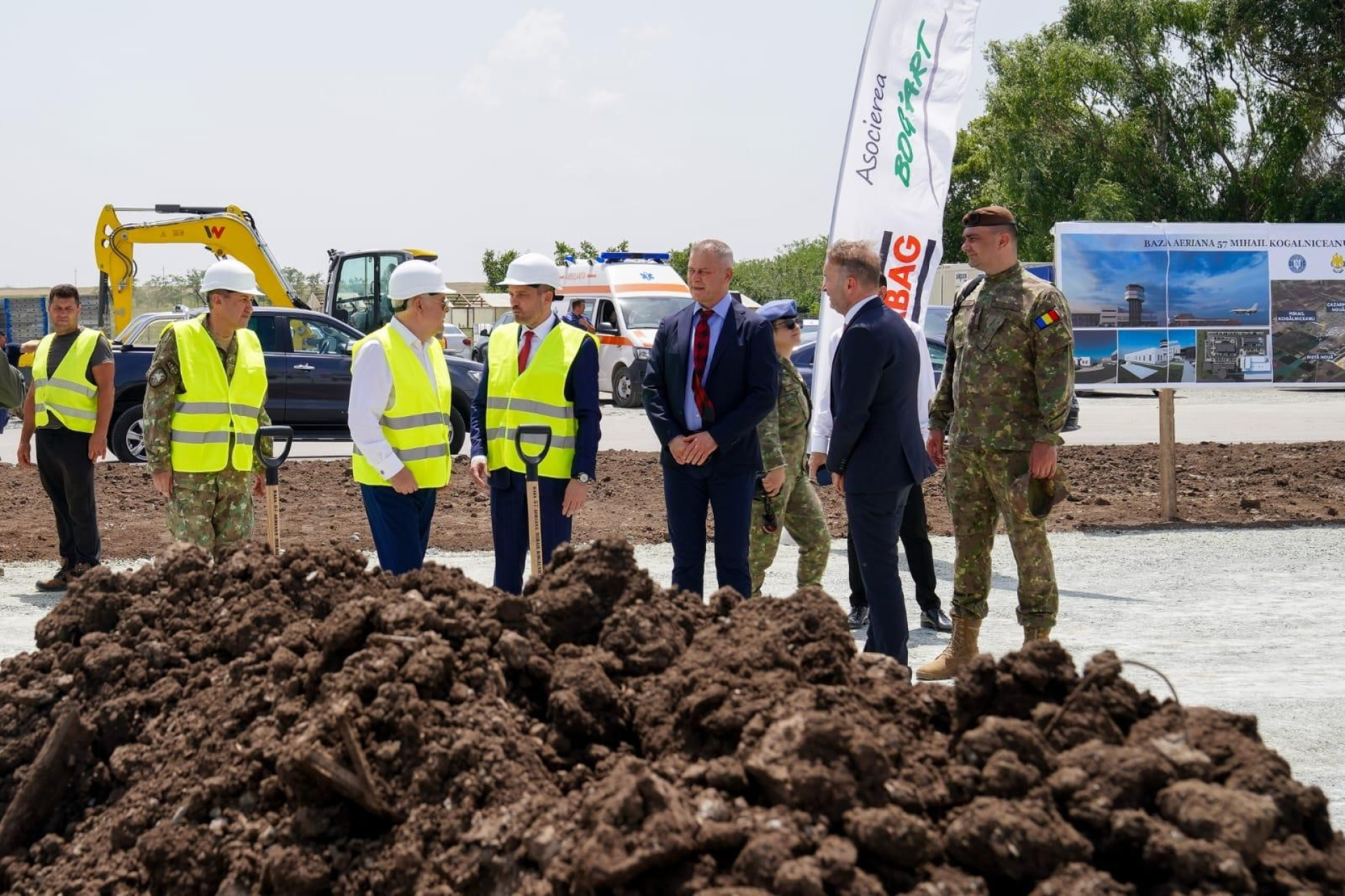
The groundbreaking ceremony held on 11 June 2024

In 2021, the first stage of a 2 billion euro project was launched by the Romanian Armed Forces to modernize and expand the base as a response to the 2014 Russian annexation of Crimea. Under this project, approved by the Romanian Government in 2019, plans are to build a small military city, similar to Ramstein Air Base. This project will house around 50,000 NATO troops and civilians, with a total area of around 2,800 ha (6,900 acres). Geopolitical analyst Dorin Popescu considers it will become a "permanent NATO military structure." and a Romanian Defence Ministry official told Euractiv that as a result of the "decision to expand NATO's military base. Romania will have stronger security guarantees."

The project includes expanding the areas of barracks 888, 1288, 3494, and 2354, and building regular and protective aircraft hangars, maintenance hangars, an engine testing area, administrative and social centers, a photovoltaic park, and two new runways. The military city will include schools, kindergartens, shops, and a hospital. The project is divided into four stages, which will be implemented over 20 years. Mihail Kogălniceanu is set to become NATO's biggest airbase in Europe.

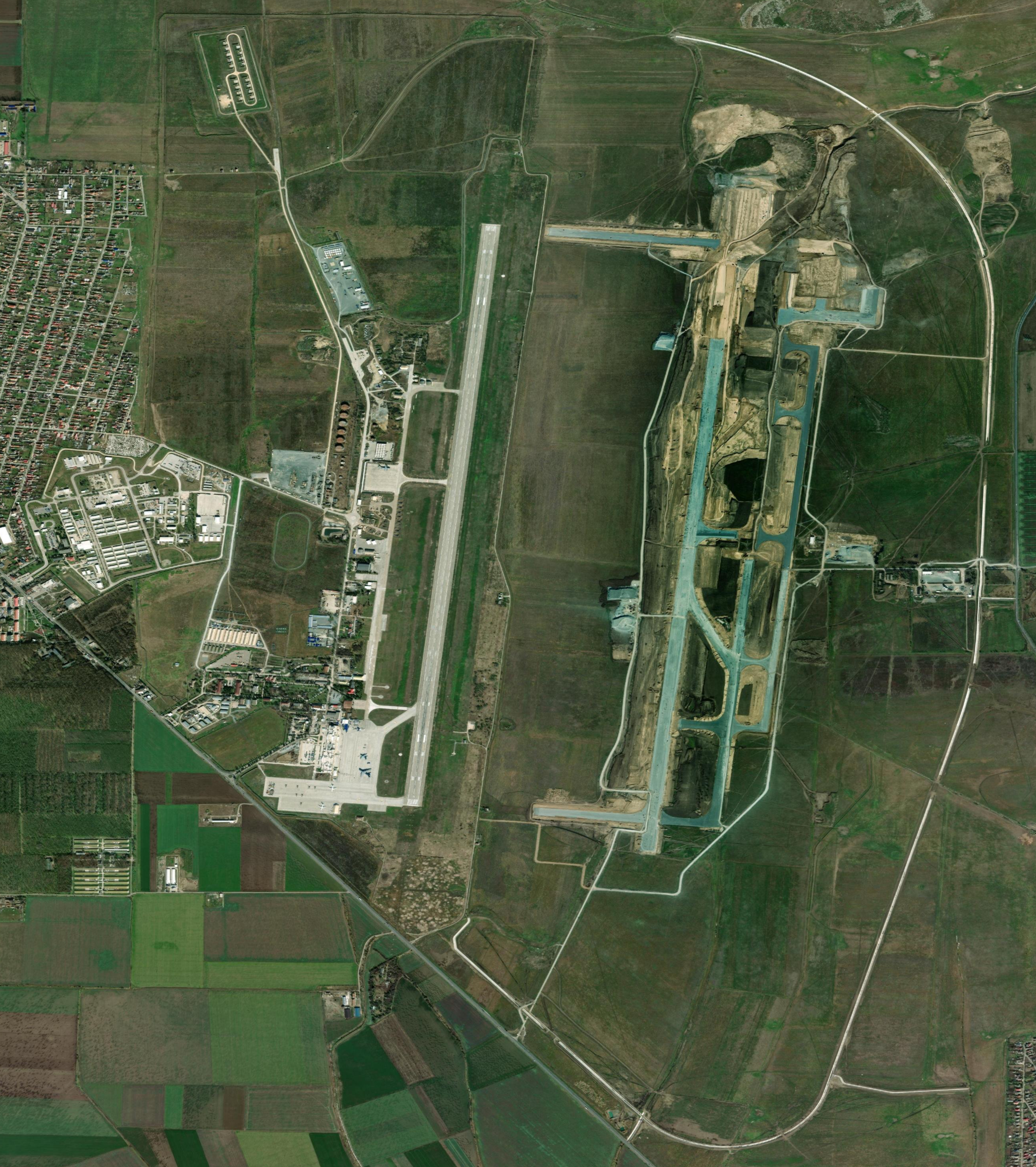
Satellite view of the base c. March 2025

In June 2022, the Ministry of Defence announced the winners of the first stage of the contract for the base upgrades. Three companies and 22 subcontractors will participate in the works. The state secret-level classified project is set to finish in almost nine years.

Construction began in 2024 on the south side of the future base, where a high-capacity electrical network and access roads are being built. On 11 June 2024, construction started on the first runway of the base after a groundbreaking ceremony attended by the Minister of National Defence, the Deputy Chief of the Defense Staff, the Air Force Chief of Staff, and the head of the Domains and Infrastructures Directorate. The construction of the runway is set to finish in 2027.

The news of the base expansion project has caused concern among Russian officials. As early as March 2024, Russian politicians have issued warnings to Romania over the project, with Andrey Klimov, deputy Chairman of the Federation Council Committee on Foreign Affairs, calling it a "threat for Bucharest" and warning that the base is "more likely to be among the first targets for retaliatory strikes."

== Foreign deployments ==
=== NATO Enhanced Air Policing ===
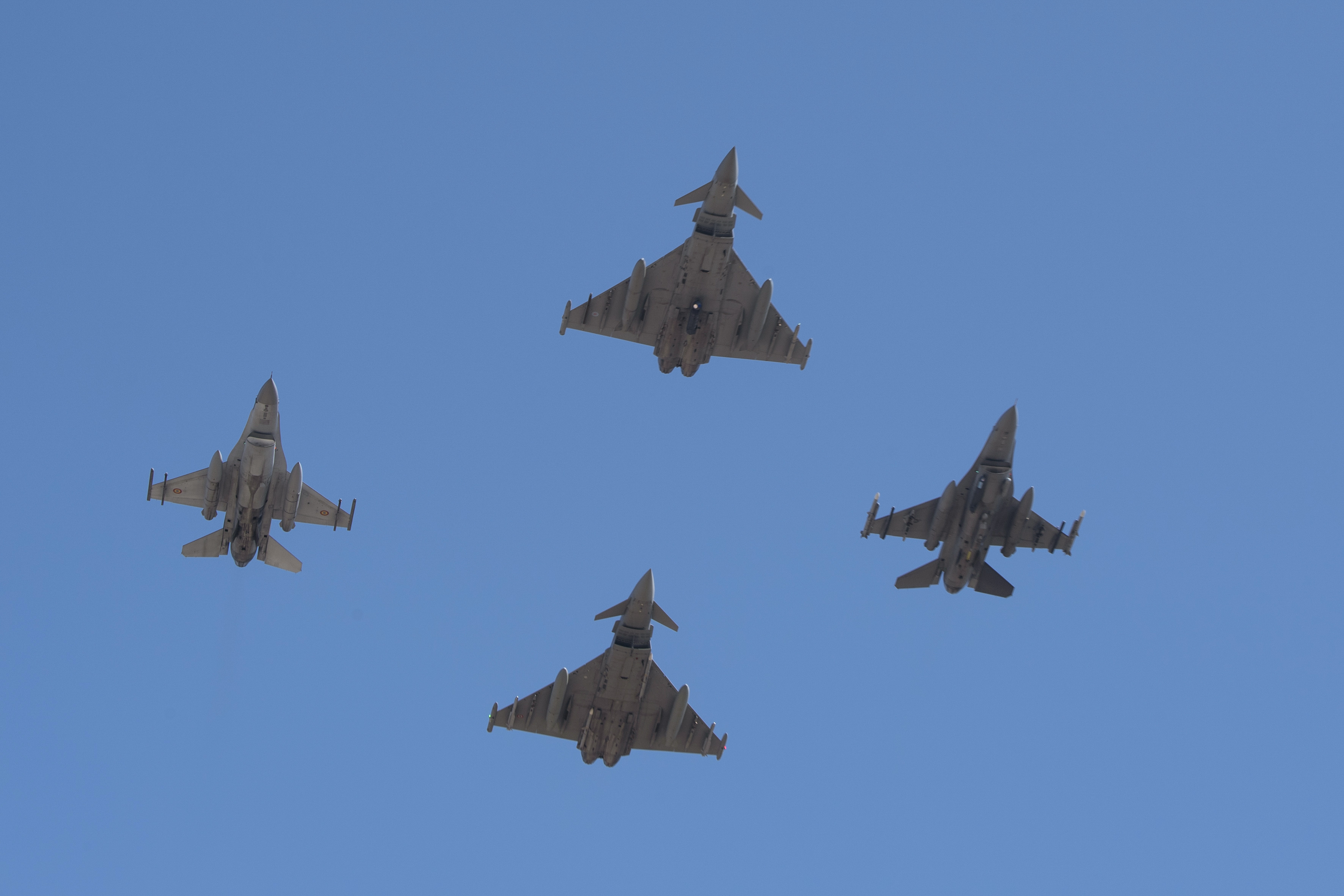
Romanian and US F-16s fly in formation alongside British and Italian Typhoons.

The Enhanced Air Policing (eAP) mission was established in 2014 as NATO's response to Russia's annexation of Crimea. Since then several NATO member nations have deployed to the base to participate in this mission:

- The Royal Air Force, has participated with its Eurofighter Typhoons in the mission since 2017.
- The Royal Canadian Air Force, participated in the mission with CF-18 Hornets since 2017.
- The Italian Air Force Eurofighter Typhoons started its deployments in the mission in 2019.
- The Spanish Air Force Eurofighter Typhoons began participating in the mission in 2021. From 2022, Spanish F-18 Hornets have also participated in the mission.
- The German Air Force started conducting air policing missions from Mihail Kogălniceanu with Eurofighter Typhoons in 2022.
- The Finnish Air Force began deployments on the eAP mission with F/A-18 Hornets in 2024.

The first deployment to Mihail Kogălniceanu as part of the NATO enhanced Air Policing mission was a detachment of four Eurofighter Typhoons of the United Kingdom's Royal Air Force. The detachment, part of No. 135 Expeditionary Air Wing under the code-named Operation Biloxi, arrived at the air base on 24 April 2017. Until August 2017, these Eurofighters belonging to No. 3 Squadron, conducted over 280 sorties in support of the NATO training operations in the region and one sortie in response to Russian Air Force activity over the Black Sea. On 15 August 2018, four Eurofighter Typhoons of No. 1 Squadron, 135 Expeditionary Air Wing were scrambled to intercept six Russian Su-24 Fencer bombers over the Black Sea.

In August 2017, the Royal Canadian Air Force replaced the RAF on the eAP mission with a detachment of four CF-18 Hornet fighters. The personnel belonged to the 409 Tactical Fighter Squadron, and were supported by the 2 Air Expeditionary Wing and 17 Wing Winnipeg. The Canadian mission is part of Operation Reassurance. The first deployment lasted from August to December 2017. On 5 September 2020, Canada's Air Task Force contributed six CF-18s to the eAP mission. In 2022, eight CF-18s were brought to the base.

On 3 June 2024, seven Finnish F/A-18 Hornets of 31 Squadron from Rissala Air Base arrived at Mihail Kogălniceanu for a two-month deployment as part of the enhanced Air Policing mission. This marked the first Finnish Air Force deployment on a NATO mission since the country's accession to the alliance.

=== US Army Garrison ===
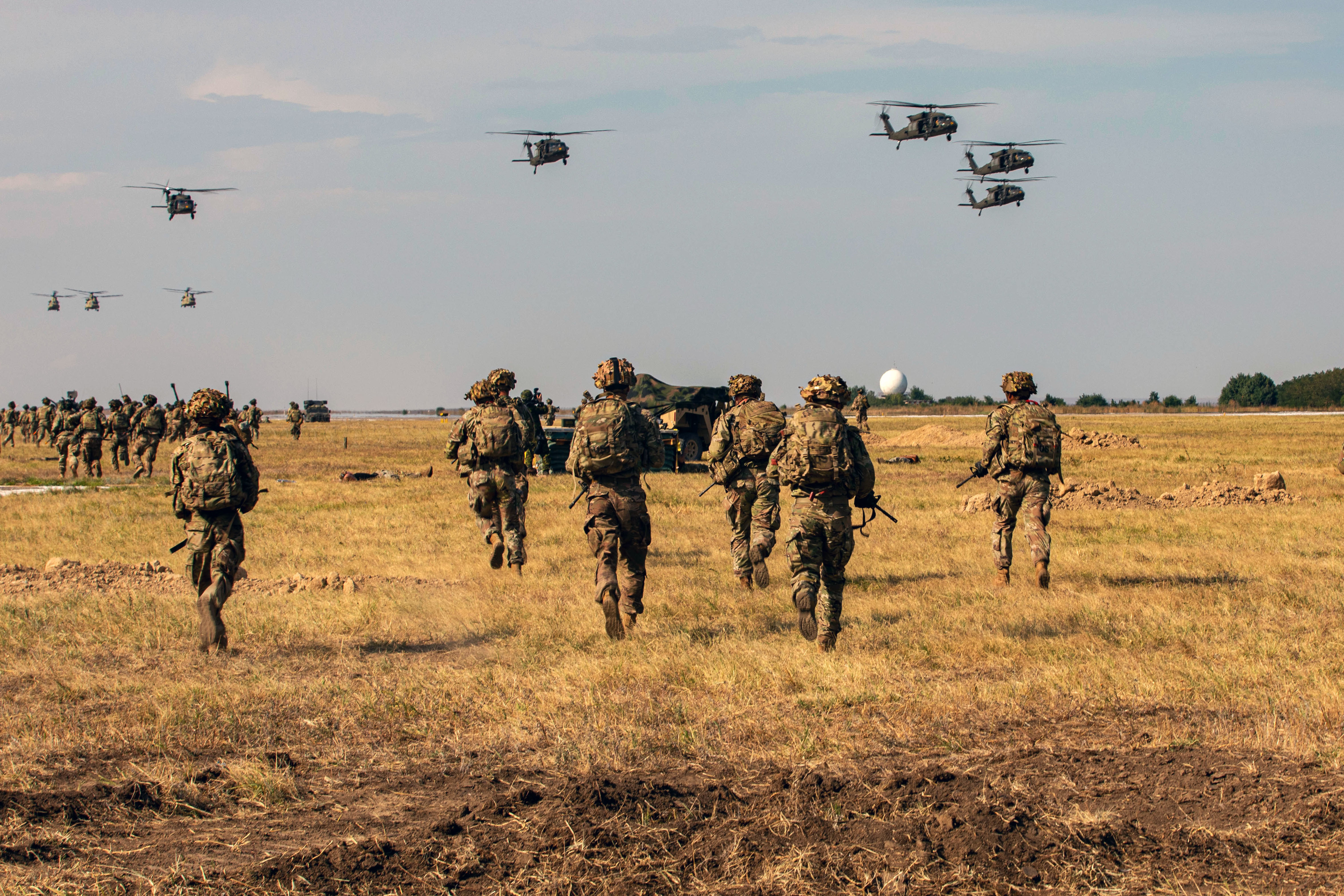
Soldiers of the 101st Airborne Division conduct an air assault demonstration in July 2022

In 2009, construction for the new United States Army base on the site of the former 34th Territorial Mechanized Brigade garrison was completed. The Permanent Forward Operating Site (PFOS) operated by the United States was intended to become one of the main operating bases of United States Army Europe's Joint Task Force East (JTF-E), a rotating task force initially to be provided by the U.S. 2nd Cavalry Regiment, which was to eventually grow to a brigade-sized force. The JTF-E concept was reduced to the Army-only Task Force East. Task Force East has since been transformed into Area Support Group Black Sea (ASG-BS) of the 21st Theater Sustainment Command.

In 2016, the Army Support Activity-Black Sea (ASA-Black Sea) was established with the role of supporting the American soldiers deployed at the base as well as those deployed to the Novo Selo Range in Bulgaria. ASA-Black Sea was first part of US Army Garrison Ansbach then moved under US Army Garrison Rheinland-Pfalz. In June 2024, the Army Support Activity was transformed into the US Army Garrison Black Sea (USAG Black Sea) of the United States Army Installation Management Command, the ninth US Army Garrison in Europe.

As part of Operation Atlantic Resolve, a US Army Light Division is deployed at the base on a nine-month rotation basis. With the reactivation of the US Army V Corps, the unit came under its command. As of 2023, the Division comprises an Infantry Brigade Combat Team, and a Sustainment Brigade. Multiple rotary-wing elements from the Regionally Aligned Forces rotation force are also deployed at the base. As of March 2025, over 1,400 American soldiers were stationed at Mihail Kogălniceanu. By March 2026, there were around 700 American soldiers at Mihail Kogălniceanu after the number of US soldiers in Romania had been reduced from 1,700 troops to 1,000 troops in late 2025.

In June 2022, elements of the 101st Airborne Division were deployed at the base. On 30 July 2022, they uncased their colors and conducted an air assault demonstration together with the Romanian 9th Mechanized Brigade. As of October 2022, about 4,700 soldiers from Fort Campbell were deployed on NATO's eastern flank, 2,400 of which were at the Mihail Kogălniceanu base, marking the first deployment of the 101st Division to Europe in nearly 80 years. In July 2024, the 101st Division completed its first rotations and was replaced by the 10th Mountain Division.

=== Other deployments ===
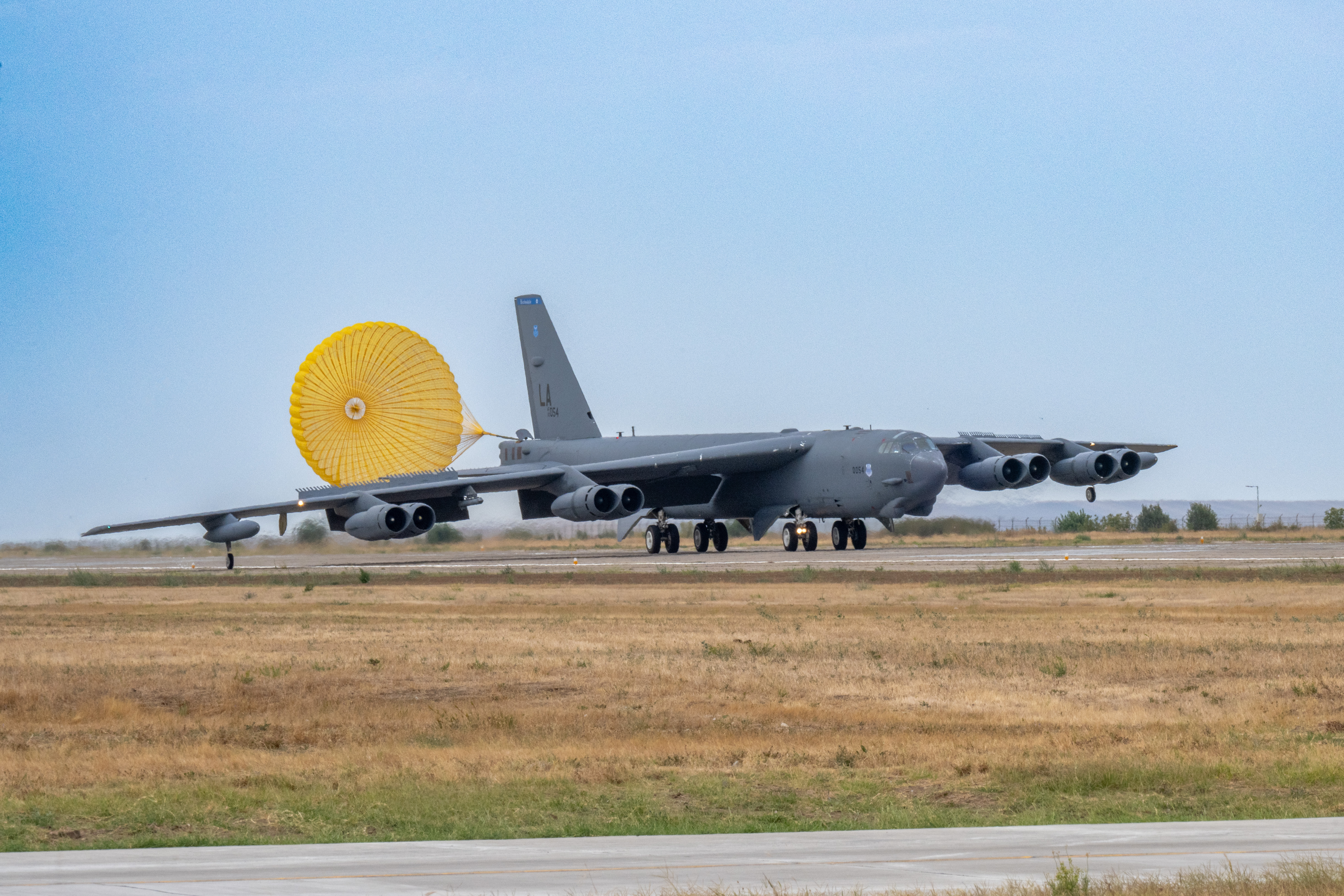
A B-52H Stratofortress landing at the air base

The United States Marine Corps Black Sea Rotational Force was headquartered at the base from 2010 until 2018, when the Corps was moved to Norway. In 2016, two F-22 Raptors arrived at the base as part of a Rapid Response program training exercise. After a few hours at the base, the F-22s flew back to the United Kingdom.

In March 2016, four CF-188 Hornets of the Royal Canadian Air Force 425 Tactical Fighter Squadron were deployed at the base for about a month, to participate in the Resilient Resolve 2016 exercise.

Starting from 2022, an ARTEMIS special mission aircraft of the United States Army deployed here for reconnaissance of Eastern Europe. Elements of the French-led Multinational Battlegroup headquartered at Cincu under Mission Aigle are also deployed at the base since 2022. In 2023, an Italian Air Force G550 CAEW was also deployed at the base.

On 12 June 2023, two B-1B Lancers of the 7th Bomb Wing stopped at the base for a hot-pit refuel. The aircraft were taking part in the Air Defender 23 exercise. On 21 July 2024, two B-52 Stratofortress bombers arrived at the air base as part of Bomber Task Force 24-4. Operating as the 20th Expeditionary Bomb Squadron, this was the first time Stratofortress bombers operated out of Romania. While flying over the Barents Sea, the two bombers were intercepted by Russian MiG-29 and MiG-31 fighters but continued on their flight path to Romania, being escorted by Finnish F/A-18s, German Eurofighters and Romanian F-16s until their arrival at Mihail Kogălniceanu.

== Alleged CIA black site ==
It was alleged to be one of the black sites involved in the CIA's network of "extraordinary renditions". According to Eurocontrol data, it has been the site of four landings and two stopovers by aircraft identified as probably belonging to the CIA's fleet of rendition planes, including at least one widely used Gulfstream V executive jet N379P, later registered, and more commonly cited, as N44982.

European, but not U.S., media have widely distributed reports of a fax intercepted by Swiss intelligence, datelined 10 November 2005, that "was sent by the Egyptian foreign minister, Ahmed Aboul Gheit, in Cairo, to his ambassador in London. It revealed that the United States had detained at least 23 Iraqi and Afghan captives at a military base called Mihail Kogălniceanu in Romania, and added that similar secret prisons were to be found in Poland, Ukraine, Kosovo, Macedonia, and Bulgaria."

== Infrastructure and facilities ==
The US military base infrastructure includes barracks, DFAC and MWR facilities, an Aid Station as well as a Fire & MP Station, a Troop Medical Center, a gym and a post exchange facility. The airfield runway can accommodate rotary-wing through C-5 aircraft. The base has a rail connection with side-loading ramps. Training facilities have company-size maneuver training capabilities and include live-fire shooting ranges.

== Based units ==
The following flying and non-flying units are located at Mihail Kogălniceanu.

=== Romanian Air Force ===
Air Force General Staff

- 57th Air Base Command
  - 57th Air Operations Center
  - 57th Operational Group
    - 572nd Helicopter Squadron
  - 57th Force Protection Group
    - Anti-Aircraft Artillery Battalion
    - 578th Military Police Company
  - 57th Support Group
    - 573rd Cargo and Personnel Processing Company
    - Transport Company

=== NATO ===
Supreme Headquarters Allied Powers Europe (SHAPE)

- Allied Air Command
  - Combined Air Operations Centre Torrejón
    - NATO Enhanced Air Policing Romania

=== United States Army ===
United States Army Europe and Africa (USAREUR-AF)

- V Corps
  - Rotational Light Division
    - Rotational Infantry Brigade Combat Team
    - Rotational Sustainment Brigade
- Area Support Group Black Sea
- US Army Garrison Black Sea

== Gallery ==
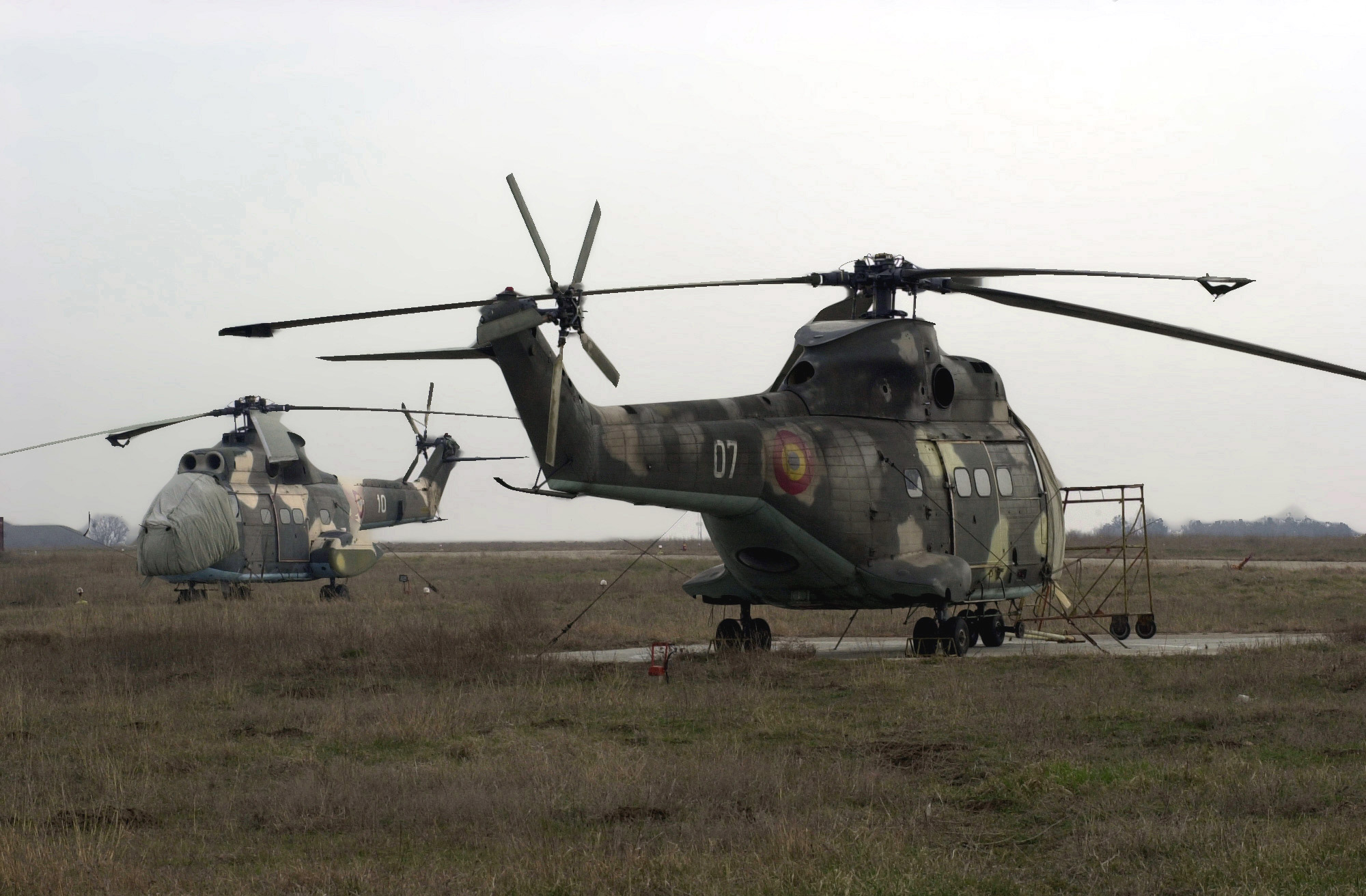
IAR 330L Puma helicopters at the base in 2003

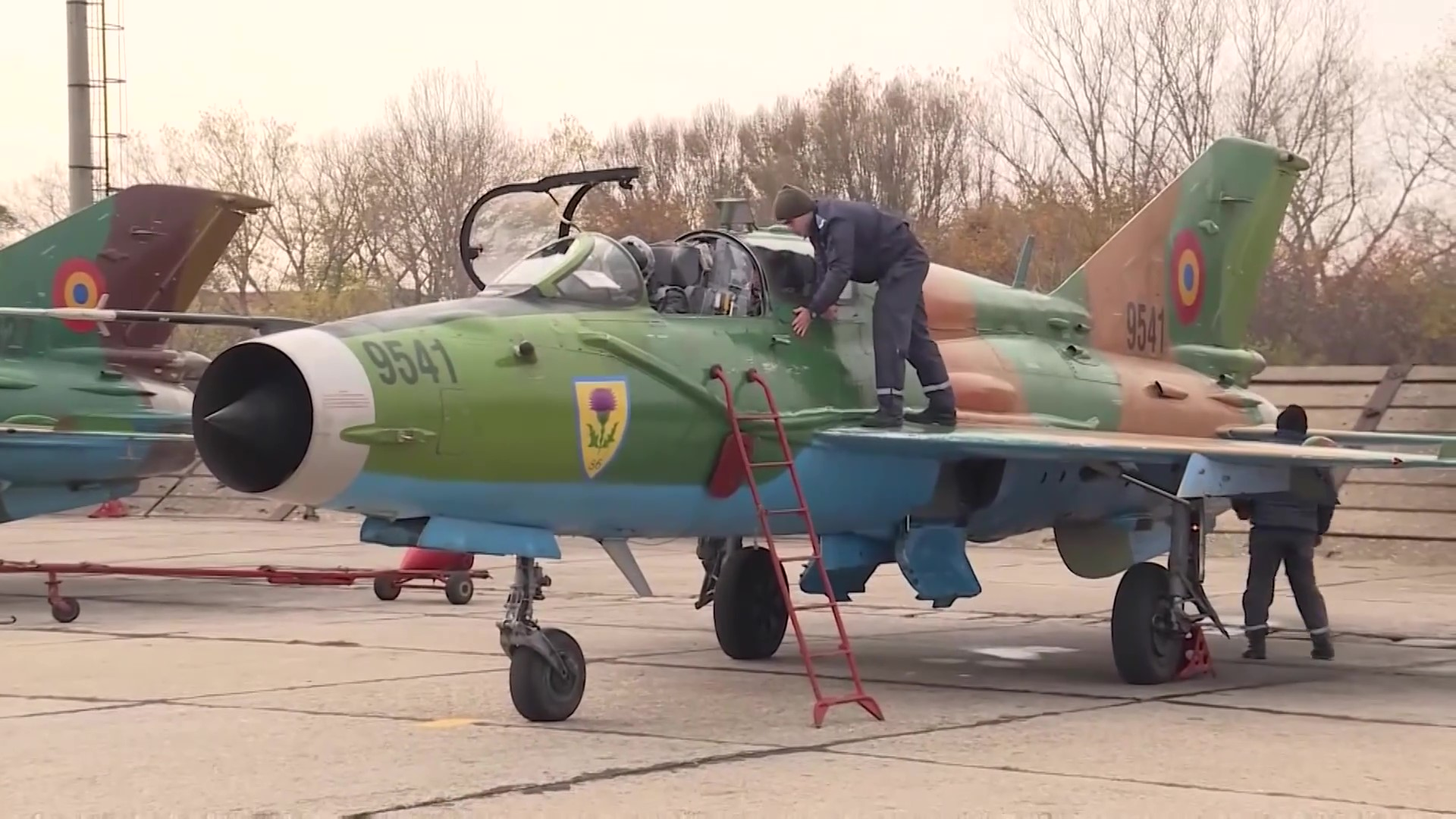
MiG-21 LanceR B at the base in 2020

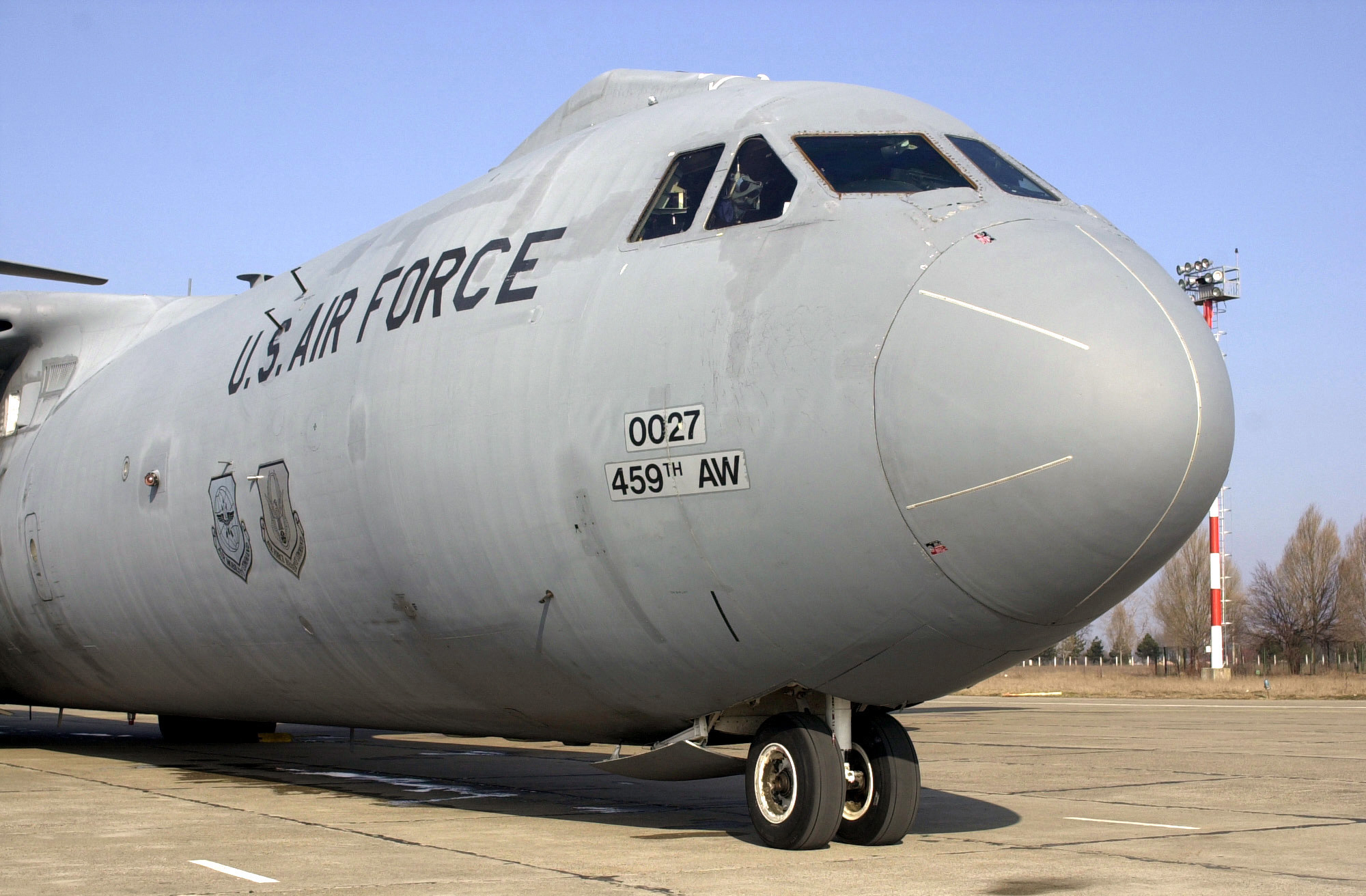
A Lockheed C-141B Starlifter during Operation Enduring Freedom

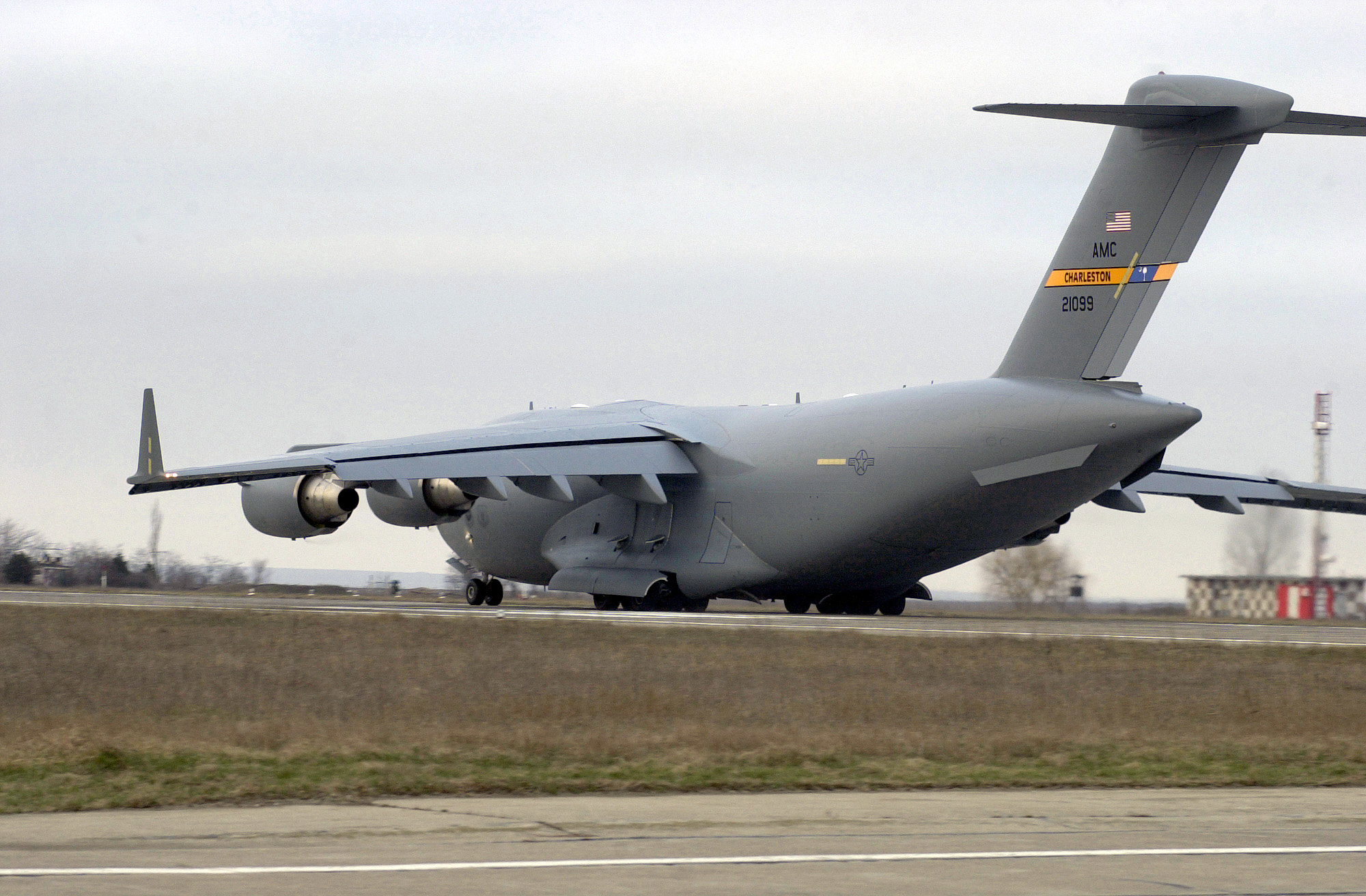
A Boeing C-17A Globemaster III of the 458th Air Expeditionary Group during Operation Iraqi Freedom

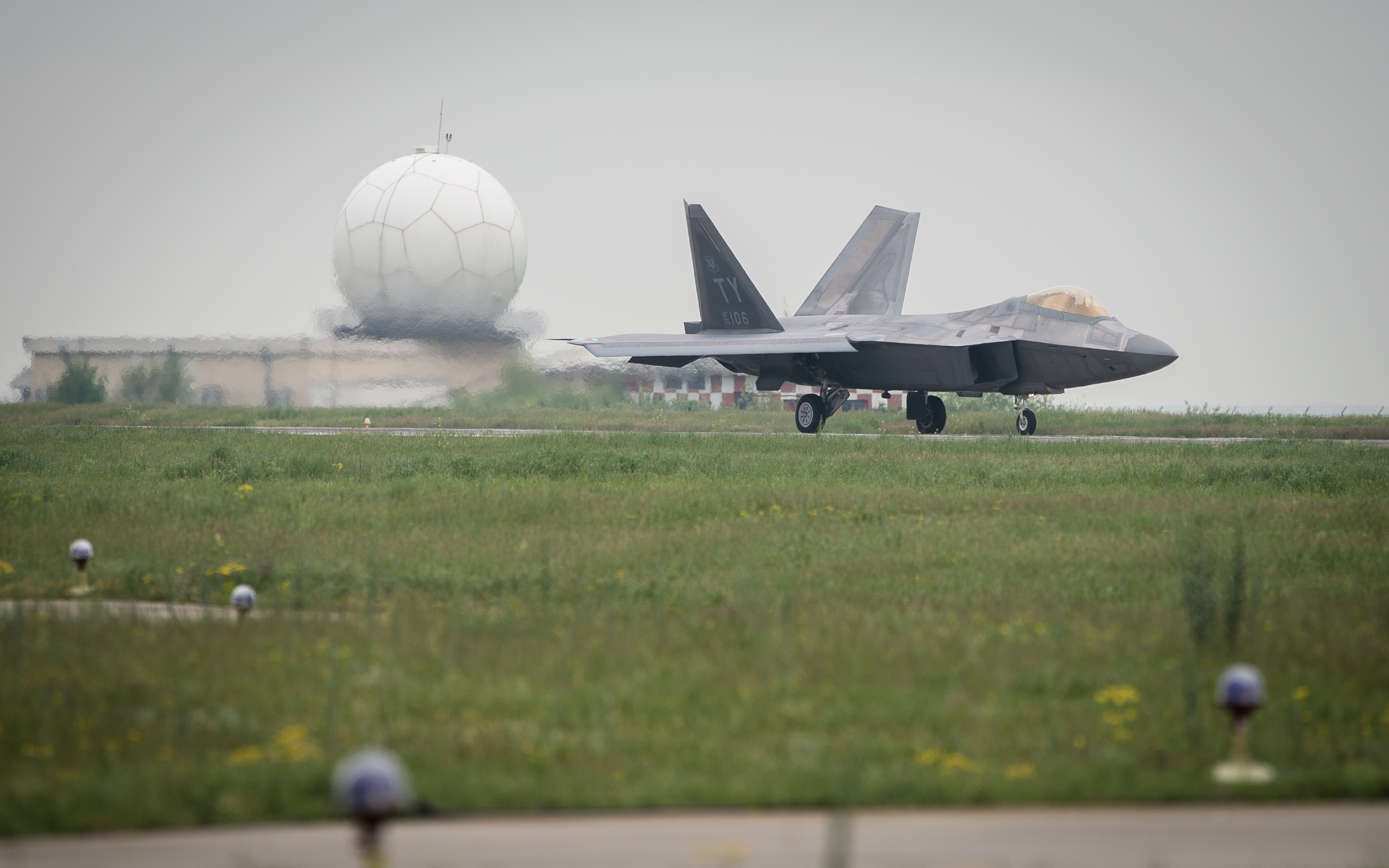
A F-22A Raptor taxis at Mihail Kogalniceanu, with a radar station radome in the background.

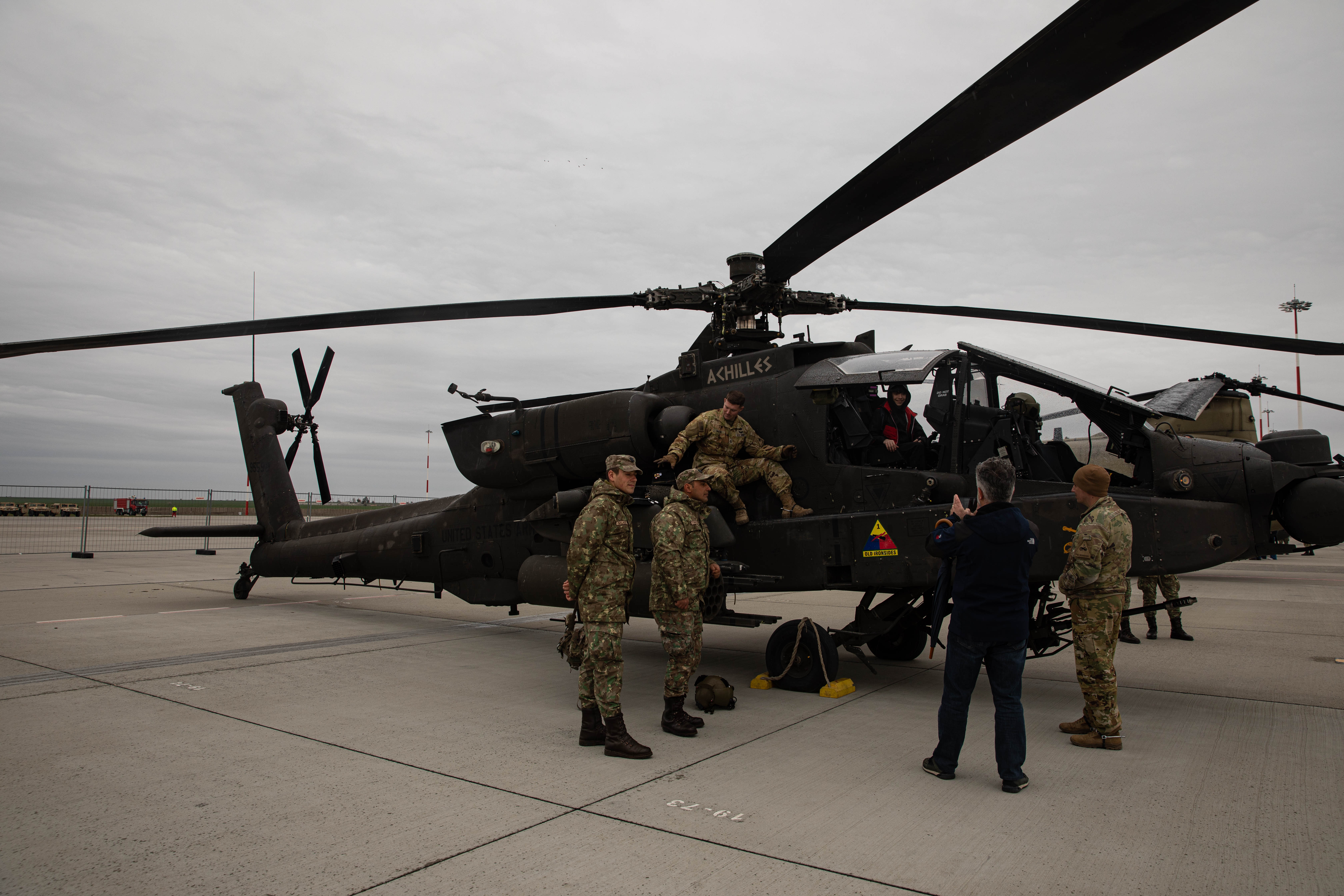
An Boeing AH-64 Apache of the Combat Aviation Brigade, 1st Armored Division

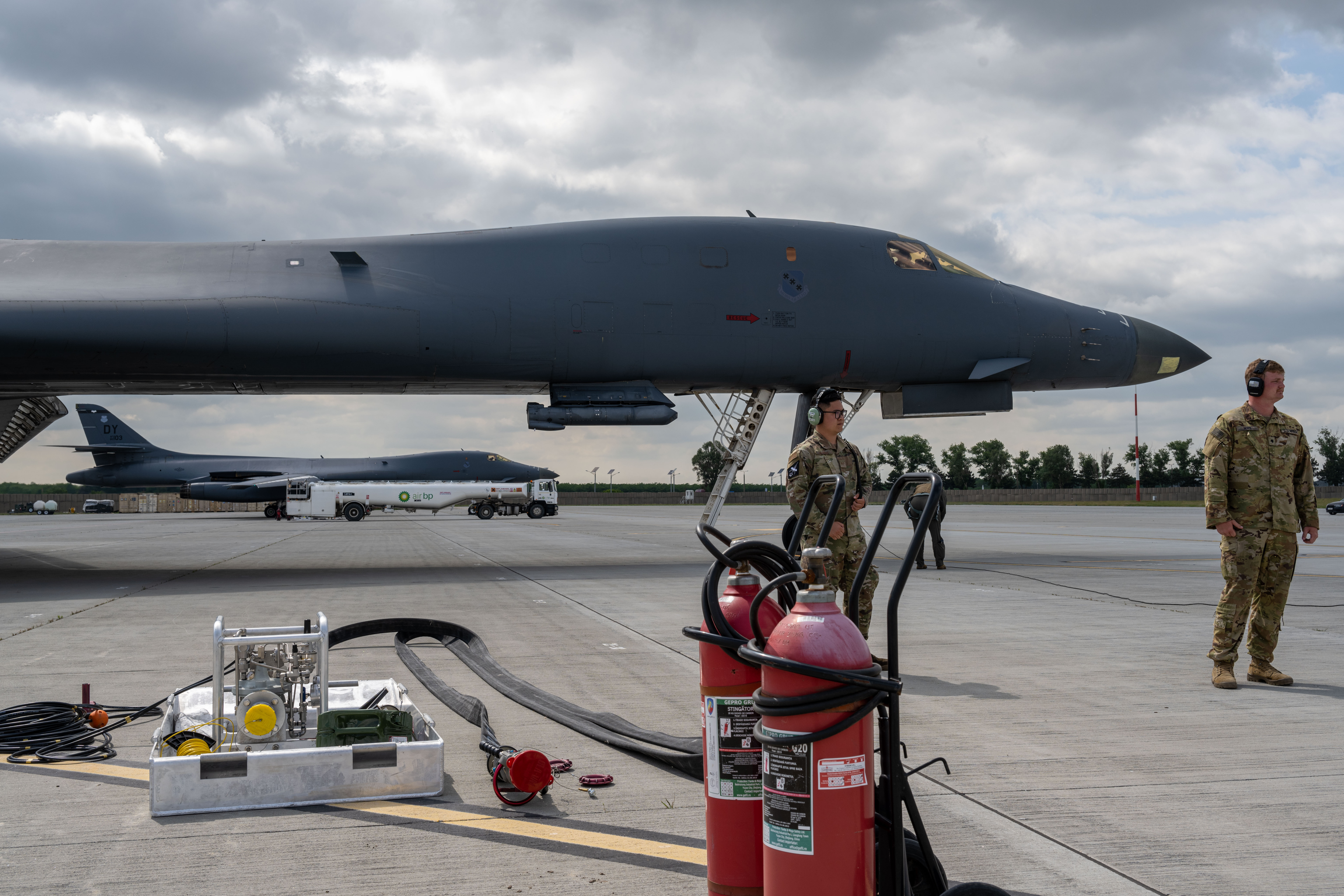
Rockwell B-1B Lancers from the 7th Bomb Wing refueling at the base during Air Defender 23

== See also ==
- 99th Military Base Deveselu
- Ramstein Air Base
- Aviano Air Base
- List of American military installations
- Romania–United States relations
- Vin americanii!
