= Novo Selo Range =

Bulgarian military training area

- Военен Полигон Ново Село
- Mokren, Sliven Province; Near Kotel in Bulgaria
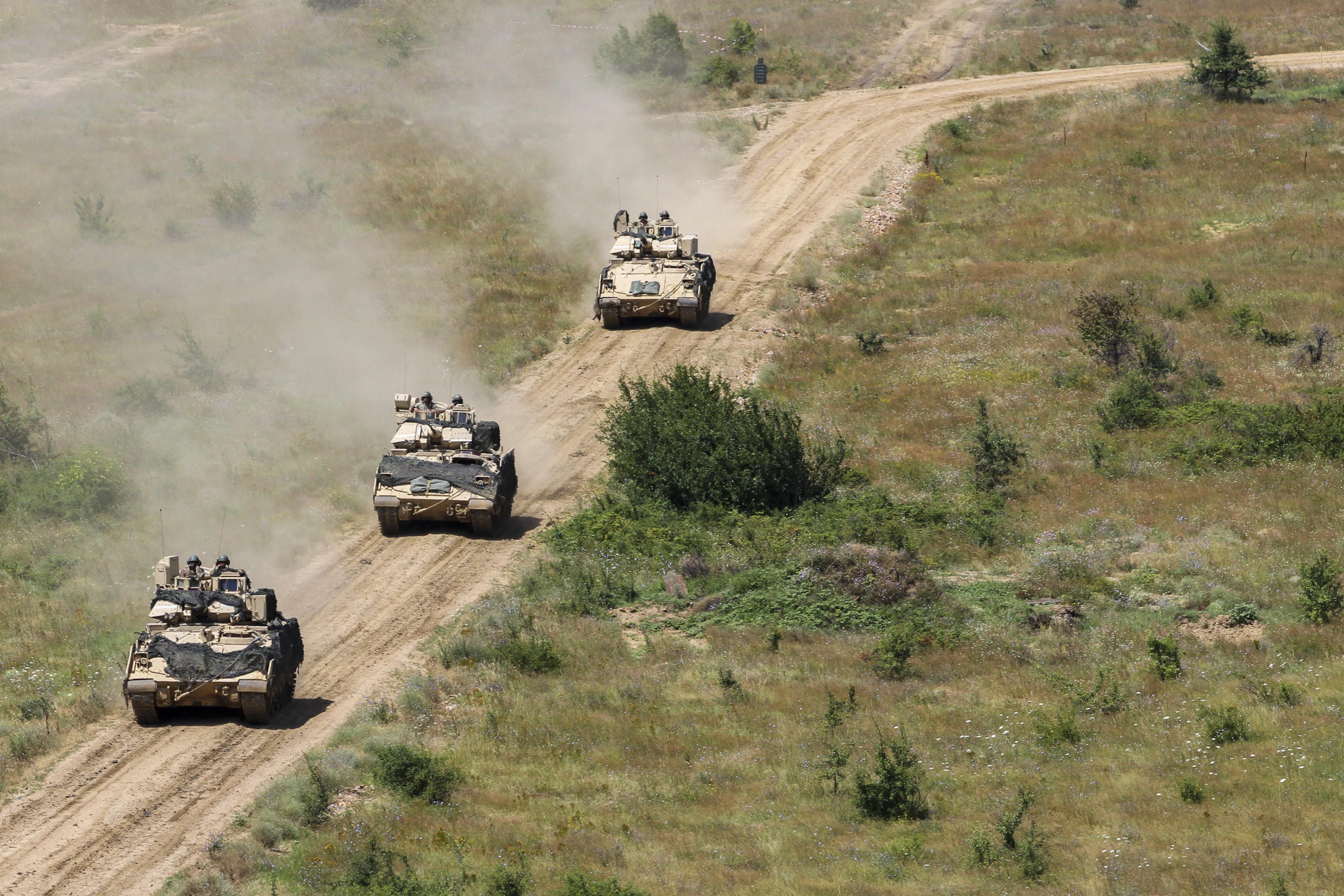
- United States Army M3 Bradleys exiting the training area after a live-fire exercise during Platinum Lion 19

Site information
- Controlled by: Bulgarian Land Forces; United States Army

Location
- Coordinates: 42°43′13″N 26°35′31″E
- Area: 144 km^{2} (55.6 mi^{2})

Site history
- Built: 1962
- In use: 1962–Present

The Novo Selo Training Area (Bulgarian: Военен Полигон Ново Село) is a major Bulgarian military training facility established in 1962, presently used by other NATO nations as well. The range has a surface area of 144 km^{2} (55.6 mi^{2}), and is situated 45 km (28 mi) from Bezmer Air Base, and 70 km (43.5 mi) from the port of Burgas in Sliven Province, Bulgaria.

== History ==
The facility has its designated areas and sectors for tank shooting, and nuclear, biological, and chemical defense and reconnaissance training. The Novo Selo Training Area is highly appreciated by NATO experts and troops, and has become the favored site of annual joint US and Bulgarian troops exercises since 2004. It supports live-fire and maneuver exercises of Bradley, Abrams, and Stryker units.

The Novo Selo Training Area is among the joint US-Bulgarian military bases established according to the 2006 Defense Cooperation Agreement between the United States and Bulgaria. The US Army started in late 2008 a $61.15 million investment in the development of new housing and other infrastructure for the American troops training at Novo Selo Training Area. The training area has a single helipad with five additional landing zones on or near the training area as well as a parking apron for up to five aircraft. Other infrastructure facilities include fuel points, barracks, an Aid Station as well as DFAC and MWR facilities.

Since 2016, the Area Support Group Black Sea (ASA-Black Sea) supported the American soldiers deployed at Novo Selo. In June 2024, ASA-Black Sea was transformed into the US Army Garrison Black Sea (USAG Black Sea) headquartered at the Mihail Kogălniceanu Air Base in Romania and subordinated to the United States Army Installation Management Command.

As of 2024, around 100-150 soldiers work as staff at the training site, less than the maximum of 2,500 personnel allowed.

== Notable Visits ==
- 19 December 2024 - Secretary General of NATO Mark Rutte
- 11 March 2025 - President of Montenegro Jakov Milatović

== See also ==
- Bulgarian–American Joint Military Facilities
- List of American military installations
