= 780th Expeditionary Airlift Squadron =

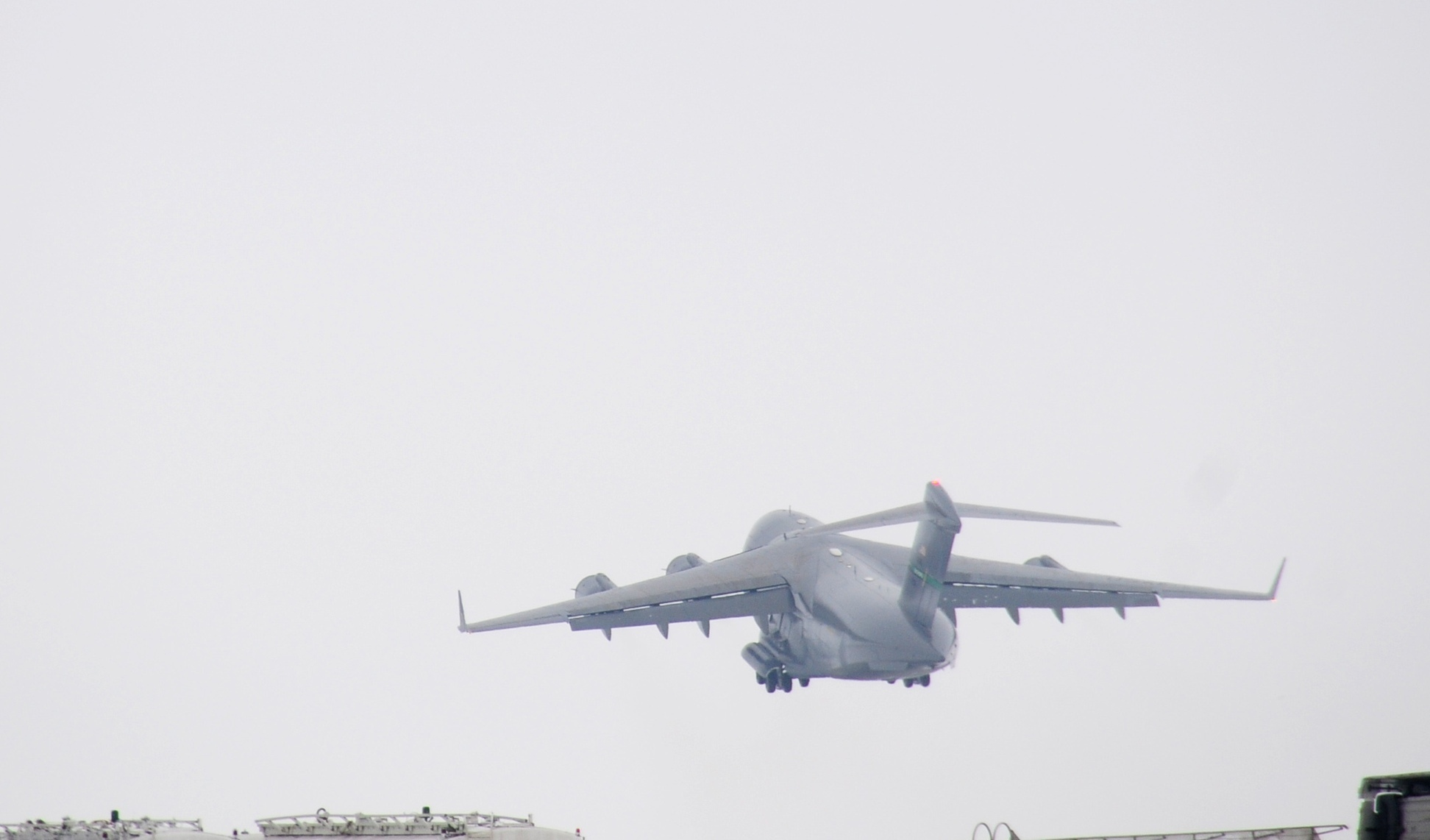
- A C-17 Globemaster III of the 780th taking off from Mihail Kogălniceanu Air Base
- Active: 1943–1945; 1953–1958; 2014
- Country: United States
- Branch: United States Air Force
- Role: Airlift
- Part of: Air Mobility Command
- Engagements: Mediterranean Theater of Operations
- Decorations: Distinguished Unit Citation; Air Force Outstanding Unit Award

Insignia
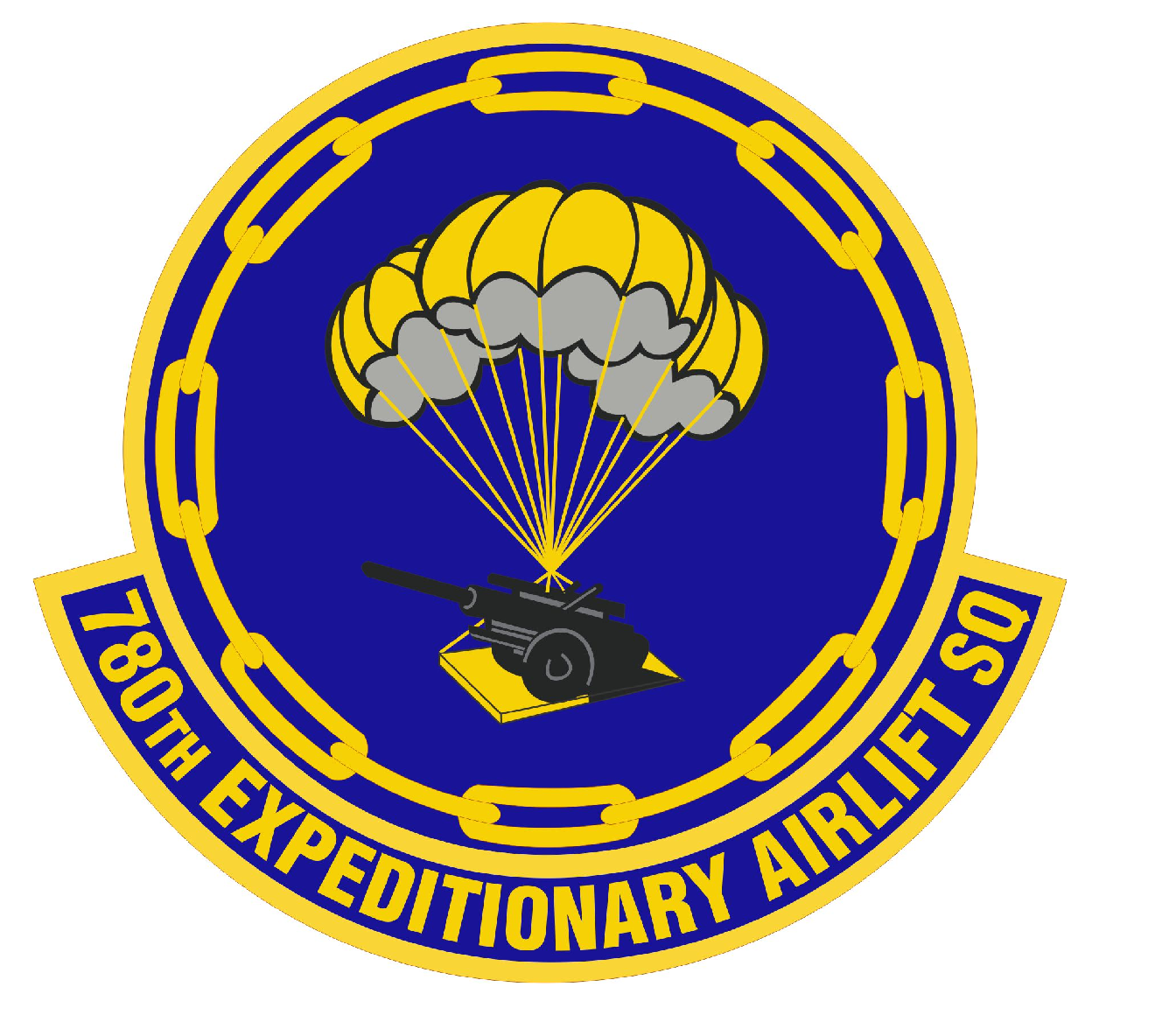
- 780th Expeditionary Airlift Squadron emblem

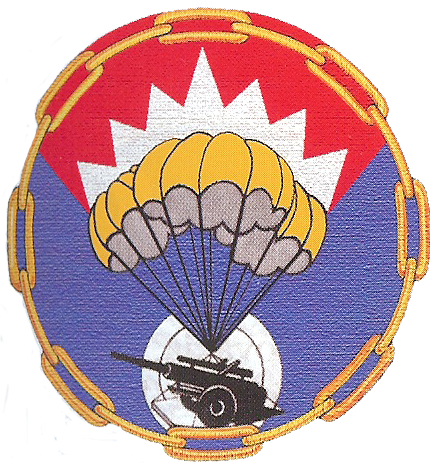
- 780th Troop Carrier Squadron emblem (Note: Approved 17 June 1955. Description: Over and through a disc partitioned per pile, red and medium blue, a border of eight gold chain links over all the base area of the red segment of the disc, a white, arched impact point of seven points, radiating upward, surmounted by an Air Force yellow parachute, in perspective, the lining gray, all detail and lines black; suspended from the parachute an artillery piece of the last color, highlighted white, all surmounting an annulet in base of the last color.)

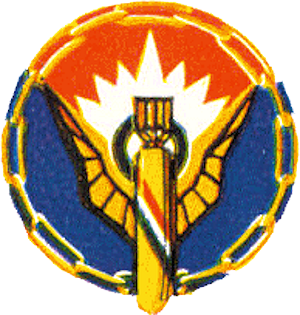
- 780th Bombardment Squadron emblem

The 780th Expeditionary Airlift Squadron is a provisional active United States Air Force unit. It is assigned to Air Mobility Command to activate or inactivate as needed for contingency operations. It was last active at the Mihail Kogălniceanu Air Base, Romania in 2014.

The squadron was first activated in 1943 as the 780th Bombardment Squadron. It served in combat in the Mediterranean Theater of Operations as a Consolidated B-24 Liberator unit, earning two Distinguished Unit Citations for its actions. After V-E Day, the squadron served in Air Transport Command, ferrying men from the combat theater back to the United States.

The squadron was activated again in 1953, when it replaced a reserve squadron that had been mobilized for the Korean War. It moved to France, where it provided theater airlift until inactivating in 1958. The squadron was converted to provisional status in 2002 and was activated in 2014.

== History ==
=== World War II ===
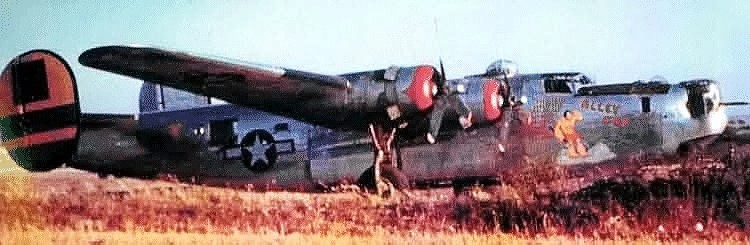
Squadron B-24H at Pantanella (Note: Aircraft is Consolidated B-24H-15-CF Liberator, serial 41-29347, Alley Oop. This plane was lost on 28 July 1944, on a mission over Yugoslavia. Baugher, Joe (18 April 2023). "1941 USAF Serial Numbers". Joe Baugher., Missing Air Crew Report 7106. The red markings on the engine cowlings identify the plane as assigned to the 780th Squadron. Watkins, pp. 114–115.)

The squadron was first activated at Alamogordo Army Air Field, New Mexico as the 780th Bombardment Squadron, one of the four original Consolidated B-24 Liberator heavy bomber squadrons of the 465th Bombardment Group. After training under Second Air Force, the squadron deployed to the Mediterranean Theater of Operations in February 1944.

The squadron arrived in the Mediterranean Theater of Operations, where it was stationed at Pantanella Airfield, Italy in March 1944. The air echelon halted in Tunisia for additional training before completing its move to Italy, where it became part of Fifteenth Air Force. It flew strategic bombardment combat missions over France, Germany, Italy, Austria and the Balkans, attacking targets such as marshalling yards, docks, aircraft factories and oil production facilities. On 8 July 1944 the squadron attacked an oil refinery and marshalling yards near Vienna, Austria despite heavy flak and fighter opposition, earning the unit a Distinguished Unit Citation. It was awarded a second citation for an attack on 3 August 1944 against a steel plant in Friedrichshafen, Germany.

The squadron was occasionally diverted from the strategic campaign. It attacked troop concentrations in May 1944 to assist partisan forces in Yugoslavia and performed interdiction missions to support the advance on Rome. Prior to Operation Dragoon, the invasion of southern France, it attacked bridges, railroads and gun emplacements near the landing area. It supported Red Army and Romanian Army forces advancing in the Balkans in October 1944 and Allied forces in Northern Italy in April 1945.

The squadron moved to Waller Field, Trinidad and became part of Air Transport Command in June 1945. It used its Liberators as transports, flying personnel from Trinidad to Florida. The unit was inactivated in Trinidad during July 1945. The squadron was redesignated as very heavy bomber squadron in 1945, but remained inactive.

=== Airlift operations ===
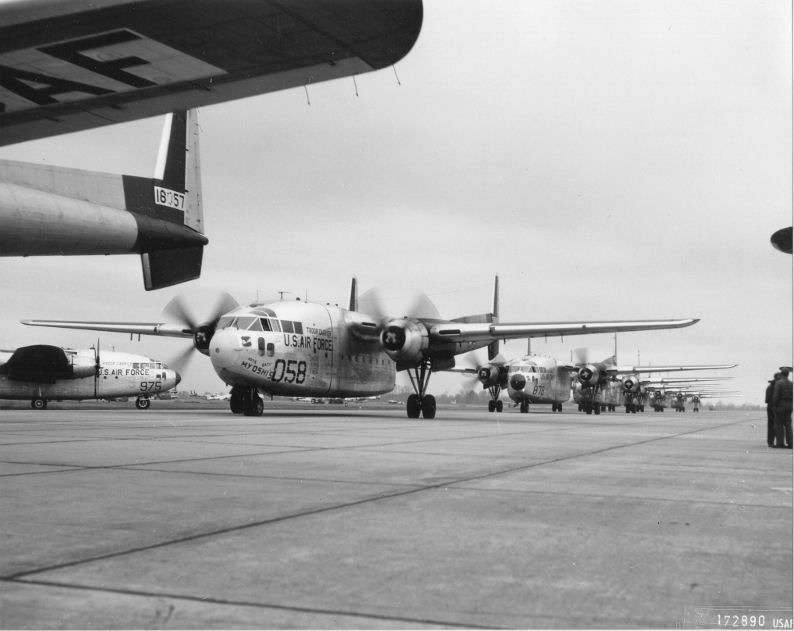
465th Troop Carrier Group C-119Gs

In February 1953, Tactical Air Command activated the 465th Troop Carrier Group at Donaldson Air Force Base, South Carolina to replace the 433d Troop Carrier Group, a reserve unit that had been mobilized for the Korean War. The squadron was redesignated the 780th Troop Carrier Squadron and assumed the personnel, mission and aircraft of the 309th Troop Carrier Squadron, which was simultaneously inactivated. The 443d Group was in the process of converting to the Fairchild C-119 Flying Boxcar from the Curtiss C-46 Commando it was flying when mobilized at the time it was replaced by the 465th.

The squadron's intended base at Évreux-Fauville Air Base, France was still under construction, so in December, the 465th Group and the squadron moved to Toul-Rosières Air Base, France. In November the squadron's ground echelon sailed on the USS General Alexander M. Patch, while the air echelon departed Donaldson with their C-119s at the beginning of December. Although construction at Toul had progressed, it could only accommodate a single flying squadron, and the group's other squadrons moved to bases in Germany. By April 1954, construction at Toul was advanced enough that its parent 465th Troop Carrier Wing and the other flying squadrons could join it. (Note: The 465th Wing and Group had been operating separately since their activation in February 1953. Maurer, Combat Squadrons, pp. 340-341; Ravenstein, pp. 260-261.) The squadron participated in airlift operations, tests and exercises in Europe. Although the squadron mission was troop carrier, there were few American airborne troops in Europe, and it focused on theater airlift flights, particularly supporting fighter units deploying to Wheelus Air Base for training at the ranges there.

In March 1957, the 465th Wing reorganized under the dual deputy model. The 465th Group was inactivated and the 780th was reassigned directly to the 465th Wing. Four months later, the 465th Wing inactivated and transferred its operational squadrons to the 317th Troop Carrier Wing, which had moved to Évreux-Fauville Air Base from its former station at Neubiberg Air Base, Germany. The squadron continued airlift operations in France until inactivating in March 1958.

=== Expeditionary operations ===
The 780th was converted to provisional status in June 2002 as the 780th Expeditionary Airlift Squadron. It was reactivated in 2014 to facilitate the U.S. and NATO withdrawal in Afghanistan. During its activity from January 2014 until the end of the mission in December 2014, the 780th EAS transported more than 83,000 US and coalition personnel and more than 5,800 tons of cargo through the Mihail Kogălniceanu Air Base transportation hub.

== Lineage ==
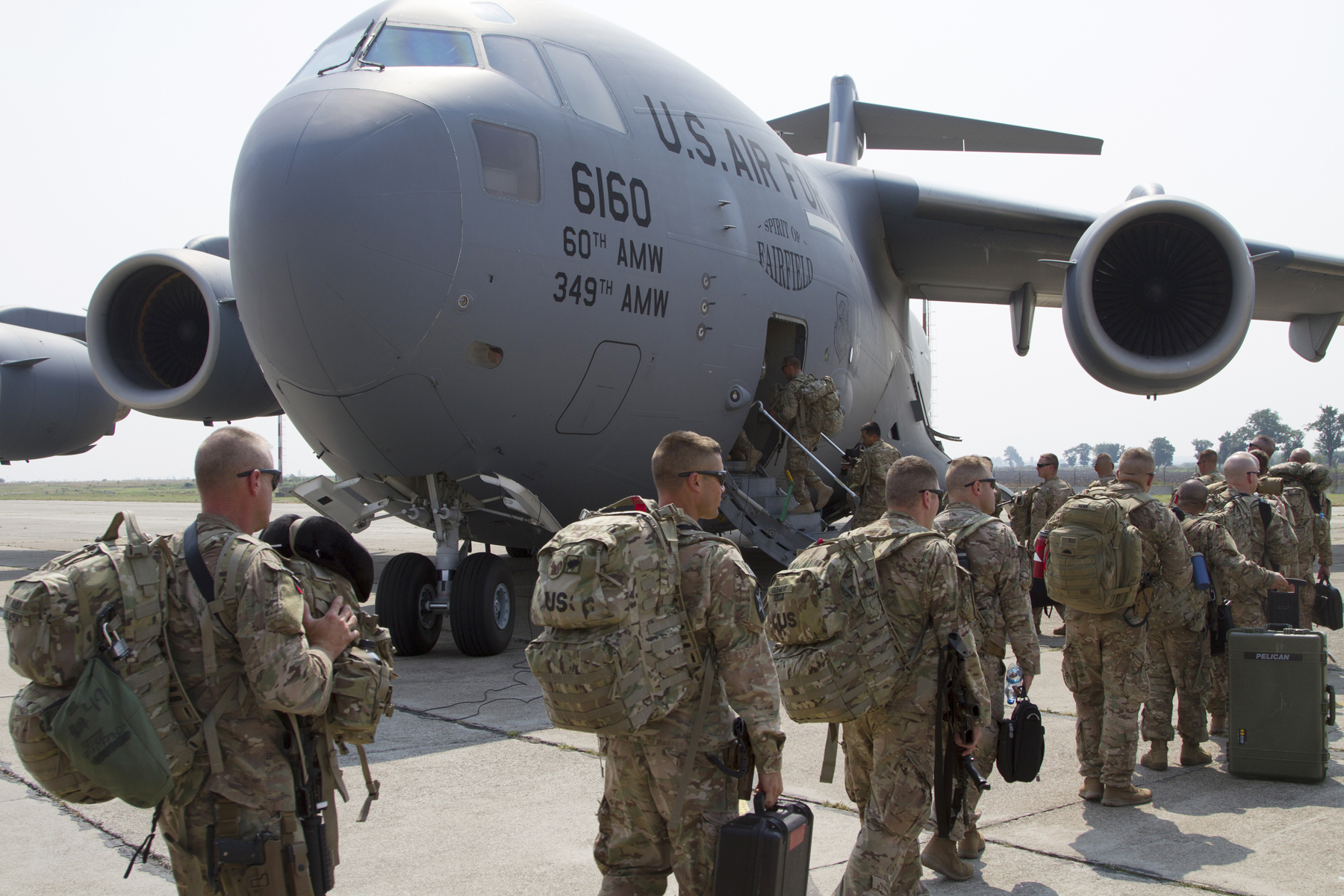
Soldiers of the 41st Infantry Brigade Combat Team board a C-17 aircraft of the 780th EAS

- Constituted as the 780th Bombardment Squadron (Heavy) on 19 May 1943

Activated on 1 August 1943
Redesignated 780th Bombardment Squadron, Heavy 20 August 1943
Inactivated on 31 July 1945

- Redesignated 780th Bombardment Squadron, Very Heavy on 14 November 1945

Redesignated 780th Troop Carrier Squadron, Medium on 22 December 1952
Activated on 1 February 1953
Inactivated on 8 March 1958

- Redesignated 780th Expeditionary Airlift Squadron and converted to provisional status on 18 June 2002

Activated c. 15 January 2014

=== Assignments ===
- 465th Bombardment Group, 1 August 1943 – 31 July 1945
- 465th Troop Carrier Group, 1 February 1953
- 465th Troop Carrier Wing, 12 March 1957
- 317th Troop Carrier Wing, 8 July 1957 – 8 March 1958
- Air Mobility Command to activate or inactivate as needed on 18 June 2002

=== Stations ===
- Alamogordo Army Air Field, New Mexico, 1 August 1943
- Kearns Army Air Base, Utah, c. 13 September 1943
- McCook Army Air Field, Nebraska, c. 5 October 1943 – 1 February 1944
- Pantanella Airfield, Italy, 15 March 1944 – June 1945
- Waller Field, Trinidad, c. 15 June – 31 July 1945
- Donaldson Air Force Base, South Carolina, 1 February 1953 – December 1953
- Toul-Rosières Air Base, France, 26 December 1953
- Évreux-Fauville Air Base, France, 6 December 1954 – 8 March 1958
- Mihail Kogălniceanu Air Base, Romania, 15 January 2014 – 29 December 2014

=== Aircraft ===
- Consolidated B-24 Liberator, 1943–1945
- Fairchild C-119 Flying Boxcar, 1953–1957
- Lockheed C-130A Hercules, 1957–1958
- McDonnell Douglas C-17A Globemaster III, 2014

=== Awards and campaigns ===
Award streamer	Award	Dates	Notes
	Distinguished Unit Citation	8 July 1944	Vienna, Austria, 780th Bombardment Squadron
	Distinguished Unit Citation	3 August 1944	Germany, 780th Bombardment Squadron
	Air Force Outstanding Unit Award	29 October 1956-16 December 1956	780th Troop Carrier Squadron

Campaign Streamer	Campaign	Dates	Notes
	Air Offensive, Europe	15 March 1944 – 5 June 1944	780th Bombardment Squadron
	Air Combat, EAME Theater	15 March 1944 – 11 May 1945	780th Bombardment Squadron
	Central Europe	22 March 1944 – 21 May 1945	780th Bombardment Squadron
	Rome-Arno	10 April 1944 – 9 September 1944	780th Bombardment Squadron
	Normandy	6 June 1944 – 24 July 1944	780th Bombardment Squadron
	Northern France	25 July 1944 – 14 September 1944	780th Bombardment Squadron
	Southern France	15 August 1944 – 14 September 1944	780th Bombardment Squadron
	North Apennines	10 September 1944 – 4 April 1945	780th Bombardment Squadron
	Rhineland	15 September 1944 – 21 March 1945	780th Bombardment Squadron
	Po Valley	3 April 1945 – 8 May 1945	780th Bombardment Squadron
