= 1st Maneuver Support Brigade =

1st Maneuver Support Brigade "Argedava"
- Brigada 1 Sprijin Manevră "Argedava"
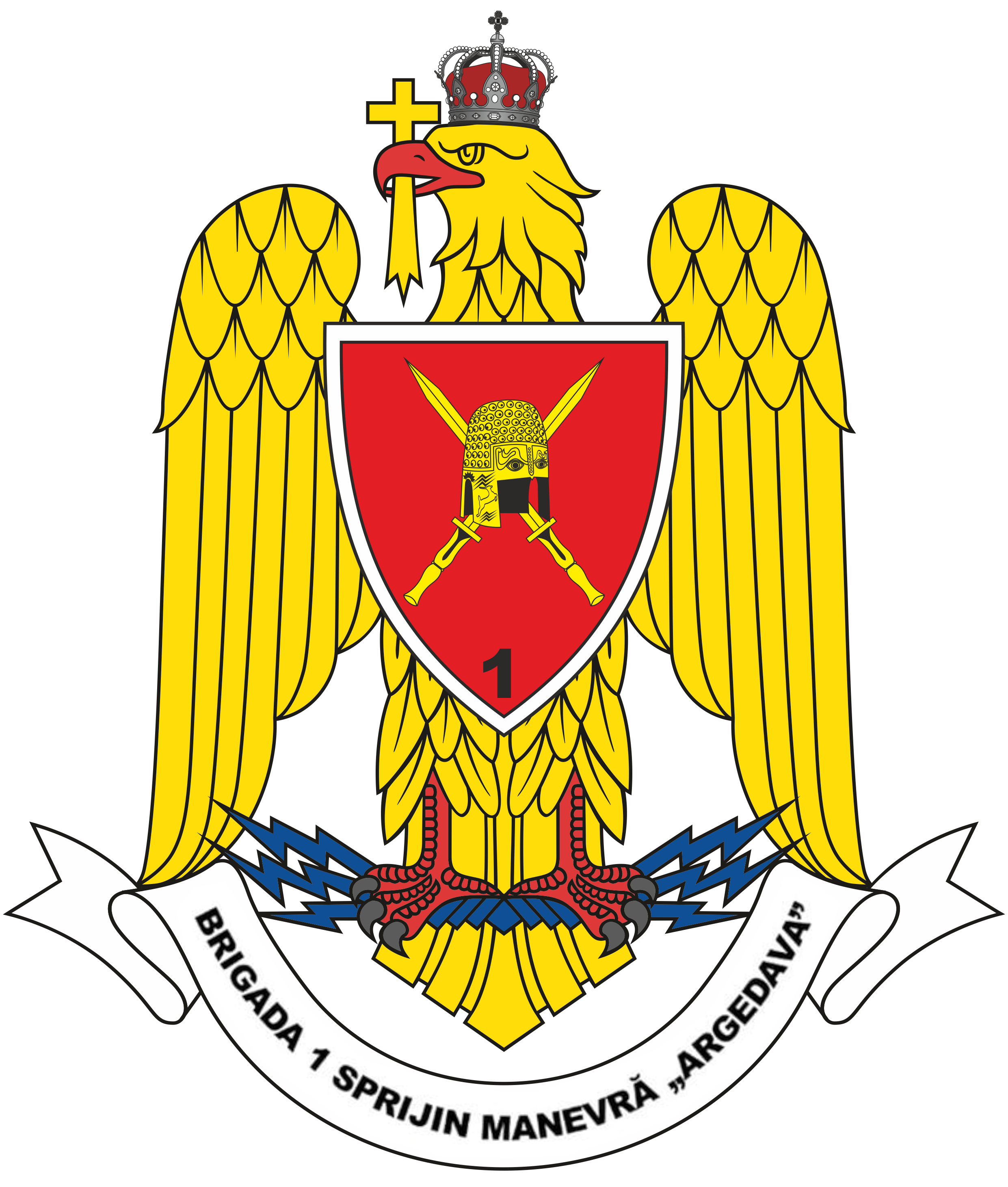
- Active: 1 April 1909–1947 (as the 36th Infantry Regiment); 1 June 2005–present (current form)
- Country: Romania
- Branch: Romanian Land Forces
- Size: 5 battalions + other supporting companies
- Part of: Romanian General Headquarters
- Garrison/HQ: Bucharest
- Anniversaries: 1 April
- Engagements: Second Balkan War; First World War: Romanian 1916 campaign; Battle of Mărășești; Second World War

Commanders
- Current commander: Colonel Liviu Vasilca

The 1st Maneuver Support Brigade "Argedava" (Brigada 1 Sprijin Manevră "Argedava") is a brigade of the Romanian Land Forces. It was initially formed as the 36th Infantry Regiment, and named after the Moldavian Voivode Vasile Lupu.

The brigade is considered the best and most modern infantry brigade in the Romanian Land Forces; its headquarters are located in Bucharest. The 1st Brigade is formed around a command with a multifunctional staff, intended to ensure the conduct of operations in the rear area and includes structures of paratroopers, CBRN, CIMIC, engineering, military police, anti-aircraft defense, as well as logistical support. The unit is under structural reorganization which is set to complete in 2024.

== History ==
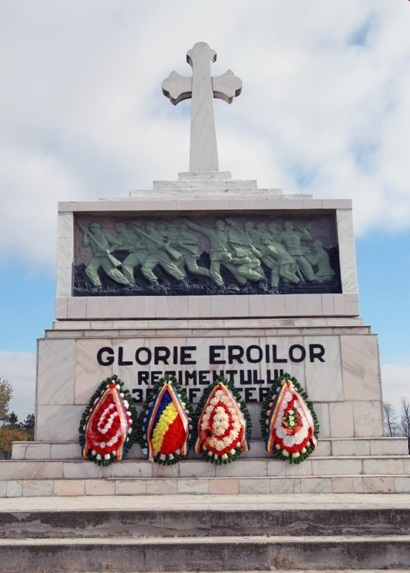
Monument for the 36th Infantry Regiment in Mihail Kogălniceanu, Constanța

=== Origins to World War I ===
On 1 April 1909, the 36th Infantry Regiment "Vasile Lupu" was established. In 1910, the Regiment was assigned to the 18th Infantry Brigade, at the same time being moved to Cernavodă. It participated in the Second Balkan War, and was assigned to the Turtucaia garrison after its conclusion.

During World War I, the 36th Infantry Regiment took part in the Battle of Turtucaia suffering heavy losses. The regiment continued to fight in the 1916 campaign being merged with the 76th Infantry Regiment into the 36/76th Infantry Regiment. From December 1916 to May 1917, the Regiment was reorganized and rearmed, and it participated in the Battle of Mărășești during the summer. In December 1917, the 36th Regiment ensured the public order and the disarmament of the Russian troops in Northern Moldavia. From July 1918, it was deployed to the Dnister border where it defeated a Bolshevik uprising in January 1919 in the Ataki area. It returned to Turtucaia in 1920.

=== World War II to present day ===
After the Treaty of Craiova, it was relocated to Cernavodă. From September 1942, the Regiment participated in the battles on the Don bend, where it repelled Soviet attacks until 19 November when it was forced to retreat and suffered heavy losses during the general offensive of the Soviet forces. By 21 November, the disorganized troops escaped the encirclement and withdrew, eventually being moved to Transnistria between January and February 1943, and returning to Cernavodă in September. After King Michael's Coup, the 36th Regiment participated in the disarmament of the German troops in Dobrogea, then in the battles in Northern Transylvania. The Regiment continued with the campaigns in Hungary and Czechoslovakia until 12 May 1945.

The 36th Regiment was disbanded in 1947, being reestablished as the 42nd Mechanized Regiment in 1951. In 2001, the unit became the 34th Territorial Mechanized Brigade, and on 1 June 2005, after moving to Clinceni from Mihail Kogălniceanu, it changed its name to the 34th Light Infantry Brigade "Vasile Lupu". Between 2009 and 2010, the brigade was transformed into the 1st Mechanized Brigade, receiving the honorary name "Argedava". Between 2023 and 2024, the brigade was reorganized as the first maneuver support brigade of the Romanian Army. The 226th Maneuver Enhancement Brigade of the Alabama Army National Guard aided in the reorganization process.

== Organization ==
- 1st Maneuver Support Brigade "Argedava", in Bucharest
  - 1st CIMIC Battalion "General de corp de armată Ștefan Holban", in Bucharest
  - 49th CBRN Battalion "Argeș" in Pitești
  - 265th Military Police Battalion "Tudor Vladimirescu", in Bucharest, with Wolf Armoured Vehicle and Otokar Cobra II
  - 635th Anti-aircraft Defence Battalion "Precista", in Negoiești, with KP-SAM Chiron
  - 117th Logistic Support Battalion "Colonel Alexandru Polyzu", in Bucharest
  - 112th Engineer Company
  - 118th Reconnaissance Company, with Otokar Cobra II
  - 120th Support Company
  - 370th Communications and Information Technology Company
  - 377th CBRN Defence Company

== Decorations ==
The 1st Brigade "Argedava" has received the following decorations:

- Order of Military Virtue, Peacetime (Knight – 2017)
