= Regionally aligned forces =

Initiated in 2013 by the 38th Chief of Staff of the United States Army, Raymond T. Odierno, regionally aligned forces (RAF) provide combatant commands (CCMDs), scalable and tailorable Army capabilities for all requirements, including operational missions, bilateral and multilateral military exercises and security cooperation activities. Army regional alignment is an organizing principle that improves the Army's ability to provide units and capabilities. Regional alignment provides focus and direction for unit training and preparation. RAFs are drawn from the Army Total Force, which includes active United States Army, the Army National Guard and the United States Army Reserve. Corps and divisions are aligned to ensure joint task force capability to every geographic combatant command (GCC). Through regional alignment, the Army maintains its war-fighting skills and complements these skills with language, regional expertise and cultural awareness training.

== Overview ==
The 2010 U.S. National Security Strategy calls for strong security partnerships with allies and partners. The defense strategic guidance directs the U.S. military services to strengthen allied and partner relationships and to pursue new partnerships. The DOD asserts that regionally aligned, mission-tailored forces play an essential role in the defense strategic guidance, which rebalances forces towards the Asia-Pacific region while maintaining Army commitment to partners in and around the Middle East. Believing that partnerships are fundamental to regional and global security, and to ensure better and faster Army responsiveness to GCC security cooperation and operational requirements, the Chief of Staff of the Army, General Raymond T. Odierno, directed the Army to improve its ability to engage regionally with partners while remaining globally responsive.

The Army plans to remain capable of fighting and winning America's wars, by ensuring that it “… shall be organized, trained and equipped primarily for prompt and sustained combat incident to operations on land.” To better accomplish this Congressional directive within a global area of responsibility, DOD claims that regional alignment allows Army Forces to more efficiently organize themselves in strength and composition to best support each geographic combatant commander, and to quickly deploy and sustain operations in support of combatant command requirements. Importantly, DOD expected Army regional alignment to improve the Army's ability to provide soldiers and capabilities to the GCCs, to help support the United States Department of State efforts to promote greater security and stability in regions and countries whose interests share a common vision of freedom and prosperity. Following Department of State direction, and at GCC request for training and mentoring capabilities, Army Forces committed to devote resources to helping improve partner capacity to provide security to their populations; to serve as part of United Nations or coalition efforts; and to build stronger military institutions that are accountable to civilian authority and that respect the rule of law.

The regionally aligned force concept was to work within U.S. legal authorities established by the United States Congress, the Department of State, and the Office of the Secretary of Defense.

== Regional alignment ==
Some Army formations were regionally and habitually aligned before the new strategic directive. This includes soldiers within the United States Army Special Operations Command and the United States Army Civil Affairs and Psychological Operations Command, Foreign Area Officers and the Army National Guard State Partnership Program. These units have traditionally focused on specific countries and regions. They have either required or encouraged their soldiers to learn the languages of those regions. Some of these persons and units focus on a single region for most of their service. Some units are assigned to a particular GCC, such as 2nd Infantry Division(2ID) and 25th Infantry Division (25ID) to U.S. Pacific Command. Assigned units remain regionally aligned to the same GCC, although Army personnel assigned to them continue the normal rotation cycle.

The Army decided to align a brigade to each GCC to provide them with consistent, dedicated and regionally focused Army Forces and capabilities to support their security cooperation and partnering requirements, and to respond more quickly and effectively to a potential crisis or contingency. The brigades were to rotate yearly. The 2nd Armored Brigade Combat Team (BCT), 1st Infantry Division (commonly called 2-1ID), stationed in Fort Riley, Kansas, is the first BCT to be aligned to a combatant command, namely Africa Command. Additional brigades were to be aligned in subsequent fiscal years and a corps and/or division was to be aligned to each GCC. Another example is the US Army, Europe. The regionally aligned units to this Command are the 1st Brigade Combat Team, 1st Cavalry Division and the 3rd Infantry Division.

=== Preparation ===
Army RAF Forces were expected to receive a basic introduction to the culture and history of their region. Training occurs primarily at a unit's home station through on-line courses, or taught by traveling training teams. This training is important for helping U.S. Army soldiers better appreciate their region, though they were not expected to become regional or linguistic experts. U.S. Army special operations forces have historically worked with U.S. partner nation military forces and was expected to continue to do so. These Army personnel attain a high degree of cultural awareness and language capability and develop specialized, regionally focused areas of expertise. Conventional forces were directed to support the geographic combatant commanders with logistics, maintenance, communication, finance, administration, military rule of law and other services critical for sustaining and maintaining security forces that can participate in multinational operations, who remain answerable to their civilian authorities, and who respect the rule of law.

=== Employment ===
As in the past, soldiers will continue to support security cooperation programs of varying size and duration. They can travel in teams as small two persons to support military-to-military traveling contact teams (M2M TCT) that provide expertise to the host nation in areas such as logistics, intelligence, common core soldier skills such as land navigation and first aid, or critical skills such as communications. The Army could also provide several hundred soldiers to support and participate in military exercises at the request of the host nation. M2M TCTs are generally no longer than five days; exercise support could require some soldiers to remain in country for a month or more; and participation in some U.S. Department of State funded capacity building programs can last longer.

== Way ahead ==
Aligning Army forces with regions allows the integration of planning and training for GCC contingencies, focuses language and cultural training and provides predictable and dependable capabilities to GCC and Army Service Component Command (ASCC) commanders. In addition, the Army expected to consider how to manage, train and develop soldiers to support regional alignment and to ensure appropriate investments.
