= Gura Dobrogei =

- Location within Romania

Location
- Country: Romania
- Counties: Constanța County
- Villages: Târgușor

Physical characteristics
- Mouth: Casimcea
  - location: near Casian
  - coordinates: 44.4781°N 28.4964°E
- Length: 11 km (6.8 mi)
- Basin size: 46 km^{2} (18 sq mi)

Basin features
- Progression: Casimcea→ Lake Tașaul
- River code: XV.1.10.6

The Gura Dobrogei is a right tributary of the river Casimcea in Romania. It flows into the Casimcea near the village Casian. Its length is 11 km (6.8 mi) and its basin size is 46 km^{2} (18 sq mi).
