= Topolog =

Topolog may refer to the following features in Romania:

- Topolog (Danube), a tributary of the Danube in Tulcea and Constanța Counties
- Topolog (Olt), a tributary of the Olt in Argeș and Vâlcea Counties
- Topolog, Tulcea, a commune in Tulcea County
- Topolog Viaduct, a railway viaduct in Vâlcea County
