= Casimcea =

- Commune
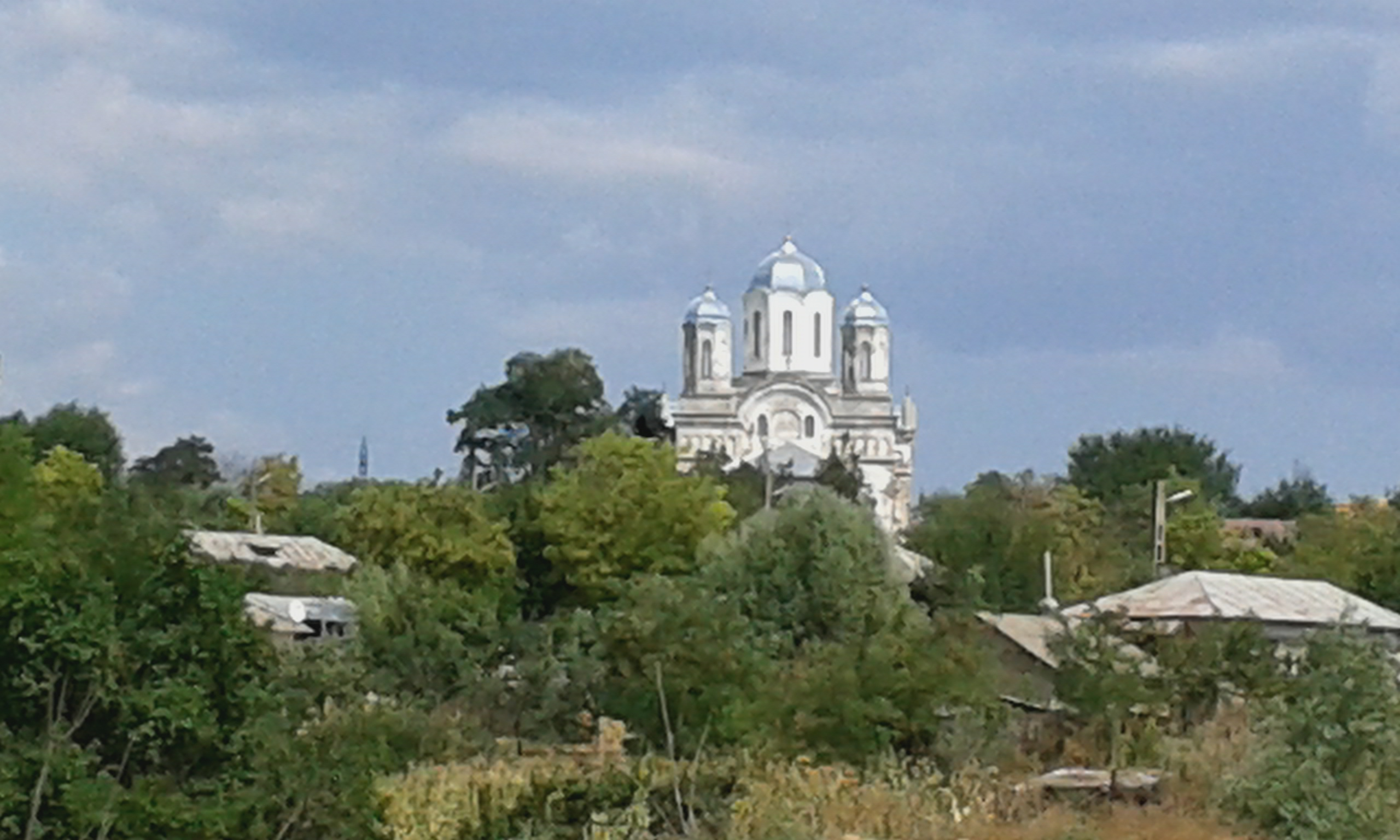

- Coat of arms

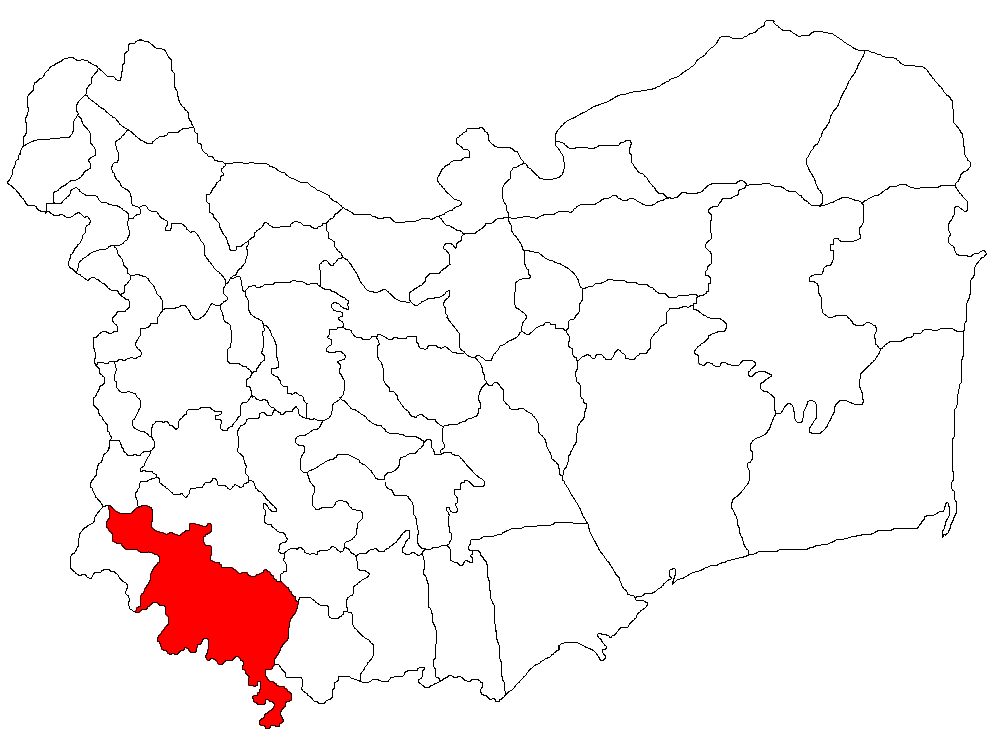
- Location in Tulcea County

- Location in Romania
- Coordinates: 44°44′N 28°22′E
- Country: Romania
- County: Tulcea
- Subdivisions: Casimcea, Cișmeaua Nouă, Corugea, Haidar, Rahman, Războieni, Stânca

Government
  - Mayor (2024–2028): Gheorghe Țilincă (PNL)
- Area: 204.47 km^{2} (78.95 sq mi)
- Elevation: 138 m (453 ft)
- Highest elevation: 300 m (980 ft)
- Lowest elevation: 87 m (285 ft)
- Population (2021-12-01): 2,555
  - Density: 12.50/km^{2} (32.36/sq mi)
- Time zone: UTC+02:00 (EET)
  - Summer (DST): UTC+03:00 (EEST)
- Postal code: 827025
- Area code: +40 x40
- Vehicle reg.: TL
- Website: primariacasimcea.ro

Casimcea (Romanian pronunciation: [kaˈsimt͡ʃe̯a]) is a commune in Tulcea County, Northern Dobruja, Romania. It is composed of six villages: Casimcea, Cișmeaua Nouă (historical name: Ramazanchioi), Corugea, Haidar, Rahman, and Războieni (historical name: Alifacâ).

The commune also included the village of Stânca (historical name: Mahomencea), located at 44.75°N 28.2833°E, which is currently deserted.

The name of the commune is of Turkish origin, being derived from the word Kasım, itself from the Arabic Qasim, "one who distributes". The suffix "cea" is a Romanianization of the Turkish -ça.

The commune is located in the southern part of the county, 80 km (50 mi) from the county seat, Tulcea, on the border with Constanța County. The river Casimcea has its source in Războieni village, at an altitude of 300 m (980 ft), and flows southeast through Casimcea village, discharging in Lake Tașaul, close to the Black Sea coast. The river Topolog flows through Rahman village, discharging further south into the Danube.

== Climate ==
Casimcea has a temperate-continental climate with pronounced steppe influences, characteristic of the central Dobruja Plateau. The locality lies within the Casimcea Plateau, at an altitude of approximately 138 m (453 ft), in one of the driest regions of Romania. The climate is marked by relatively low annual precipitation, high sunshine duration, hot summers, and cold winters.

According to data from the Corugea Meteorological Station (4 km away from the town of Casimcea) , the multiannual average air temperature is 10.2 °C (50.4 °F). The highest temperature recorded at the station was 40.2 °C (104.4 °F) on 23 July 2007, while the lowest was −21.7 °C (−7.1 °F) on 23 January 2006.

The area experiences a relatively high degree of aridity due to the combination of low precipitation totals and high evapotranspiration rates. Average annual precipitation is approximately 450 mm (17.7 in), although considerable year-to-year variability occurs. The wettest year on record was 2005, when 814.7 mm (32.1 in) of precipitation were measured. Intense convective storms occasionally produce torrential rainfall, hail, and strong winds during the warm season. The highest 24-hour precipitation total recorded at Casimcea was 114.8 mm (4.5 in) on 3 July 2005.

Sunshine duration is among the highest in Romania, averaging between 2,200 and 2,300 hours annually. The surrounding landscape consists of agricultural land and steppe grasslands typical of the Dobrujan Plateau.

Casimcea is also periodically affected by severe weather events, including winter blizzards and summer thunderstorms. Notable events include a destructive blizzard on 7 January 1966, major snowstorms accompanied by wind gusts of 18–21 m/s on 29–30 January 2014, and several episodes of torrential rainfall, including 85.7 mm in 24 hours on 3 September 1999 and 52.2 mm in a single hour on 19 June 2020.

Climate data for Corugea (altitude 219m, 2014–2026 normals, extremes 1981–present)
Month	Jan	Feb	Mar	Apr	May	Jun	Jul	Aug	Sep	Oct	Nov	Dec	Year
Record high °C (°F)	18.0 (64.4)	22.2 (72.0)	26.4 (79.5)	31.6 (88.9)	33.5 (92.3)	36.9 (98.4)	40.2 (104.4)	38.5 (101.3)	33.7 (92.7)	30.9 (87.6)	23.6 (74.5)	18.1 (64.6)	40.2 (104.4)
Mean daily maximum °C (°F)	3.7 (38.7)	6.1 (43.0)	11.0 (51.8)	16.3 (61.3)	21.5 (70.7)	27.2 (81.0)	29.9 (85.8)	30.1 (86.2)	24.9 (76.8)	17.5 (63.5)	10.7 (51.3)	5.6 (42.1)	17.0 (62.7)
Daily mean °C (°F)	0.4 (32.7)	2.5 (36.5)	6.2 (43.2)	10.7 (51.3)	15.9 (60.6)	21.3 (70.3)	23.7 (74.7)	24.1 (75.4)	19.3 (66.7)	12.7 (54.9)	7.2 (45.0)	2.7 (36.9)	12.2 (54.0)
Mean daily minimum °C (°F)	−3.0 (26.6)	−1.1 (30.0)	1.5 (34.7)	5.1 (41.2)	10.4 (50.7)	15.5 (59.9)	17.5 (63.5)	18.0 (64.4)	13.6 (56.5)	8.0 (46.4)	3.7 (38.7)	−0.3 (31.5)	7.4 (45.3)
Record low °C (°F)	−21.7 (−7.1)	−18.0 (−0.4)	−17.5 (0.5)	−4.0 (24.8)	−1.0 (30.2)	7.1 (44.8)	8.7 (47.7)	8.1 (46.6)	2.1 (35.8)	−0.8 (30.6)	−12.5 (9.5)	−12.0 (10.4)	−21.7 (−7.1)
Average precipitation mm (inches)	22.4 (0.88)	18.6 (0.73)	21.9 (0.86)	28.8 (1.13)	35.5 (1.40)	61.2 (2.41)	51.6 (2.03)	27.6 (1.09)	31.7 (1.25)	40.1 (1.58)	40.2 (1.58)	27.8 (1.09)	407.4 (16.03)
Average precipitation days (≥ 1.0 mm)	5.4	3.7	4.3	5.0	6.3	5.7	4.8	3.2	3.3	4.2	5.3	5.4	56.6
Average snowy days	5.5	4.4	2.5	0.5	0	0	0	0	0	0	0.8	2.6	16.3
Source: Meteomanz (2014-2026); Infoclimat (1980-2010); ANM

== Natives ==
- Ion Jalea (1887-1983), sculptor, academician
