= Cartal =

- Location within Romania

Location
- Country: Romania
- Counties: Constanța County
- Villages: Vulturu, Runcu

Physical characteristics
- Mouth: Casimcea
  - location: Pantelimon de Jos
  - coordinates: 44.5717°N 28.3744°E
- Length: 26 km (16 mi)
- Basin size: 128 km^{2} (49 sq mi)

Basin features
- Progression: Casimcea→ Lake Tașaul
- River code: XV.1.10.2

The Cartal is a right tributary of the river Casimcea in Romania. It flows into the Casimcea in Pantelimon de Jos. Its length is 26 km (16 mi) and its basin size is 128 km^{2} (49 sq mi).
