= Dobruja Plateau =

Land formation in eastern Romania

Coordinates: 44°00′N 28°15′E

The Dobruja Plateau or Dobrogea Plateau (Romanian: Podișul Dobrogei) is a plateau in eastern Romania located in the Dobruja (Romanian: Dobrogea) region, surrounded to the north and west by the Danube and to the east by the Danube Delta and the Black Sea.

Its average altitude is around 200–300 metres, higher in the northern part. The highest point is the Țuțuiatu/Greci Peak in the Măcin Mountains, at a height of 467 m.

The low height is generally due to exogenous processes that acted by eroding the constituent material of the rocks exposed to atmospheric agents.The rocks currently on the surface of the plateau were at its base when the mountain range was formed.

From a geographical point of view, the range of heights of the Dobrogea Mountains leads to their classification as a plateau, forming the only large extra-Carpathian unit, with the oldest geomorphological structures in Romania. On the surface, the oldest rocks are the Proterozoic green schists of the Casimcea Plateau, which are over 600 million years old. In the underground of Southern Dobrogea, there are older rocks, identified in drillings and currently covered by Paleozoic, Mesozoic, and Neozoic sedimentary layers, which are much older (1.6 billion years).

From a tectonic point of view, the Dobruja Plateau belongs to different microplates: in the north, the Black Sea microplate, which is undergoing subduction (along a Benioff plane) beneath the Curvature Carpathians, and in the south, the Moesica microplate (comprising the foundation of the Romanian Plain and Southern Dobrogea). Associated with these are landforms influenced by petrography and structure: a "granitic" relief, with scree slopes and cliffs in the Măcin Mountains, old peneplains preserved on the eroded surface of green schists, small karst forms on Jurassic limestones, structural surfaces adapted to the broad undulations of the Neogene formations in Southern Dobrogea. There is also, in the north (Măcin Mountains, Tulcea Hills, and Babadag Plateau), a set of sedimentation landforms (inselbergs, erosion glacis), and on the loessoid substrate, forms of compaction and suffusion.

The Casimcea River and Taița River flow through it from west to east. There are several lakes, including some lagoons, the most important being Oltina Lake, Bugeac Lake, Mangalia Lake, Techirghiol Lake, Siutghiol Lake, Lake Tașaul, and Razim Lake.

== Subdivisions ==
Its main subdivisions are:

- Măcin Mountains
- Casimcea Plateau
- Tulcea Hills
- Medgidia Plateau
- Negru Vodă Plateau
- Oltina Plateau
- Istria Plateau
