= Taita =

Taita may refer to:

- Taita people, a Bantu ethnic group in Kenya
- Taita language, a Bantu language
- Taitā, New Zealand, a suburb of Lower Hutt City
- Taita Hills, a mountain range in Kenya
- Taita Cushitic languages, an extinct pair of Afro-Asiatic languages spoken in the Taita Hills
- Taita falcon, a small falcon found in central and eastern Africa
- Taita Line, a railway line in Gifu prefecture, Japan
- Taița, a tributary of Lake Babadag in Romania
- Taița, a former village in Hamcearca Commune, Romania
- Taita I, king of ancient Palistin
- Taita, another name for the leavened flatbread injera popular in Ethiopia and Eritrea
- Taita, a fictional character from The Egyptian Series, beginning with the novel River God, by Wilbur Smith
- Taita, another name for a yage shaman in Colombia.

== See also ==
- National Taiwan University, colloquially called "Taita" by locals
