= Șerbăneasa (river) =

- Location within Romania

Location
- Country: Romania
- Counties: Vâlcea County
- Villages: Măzăraru, Șerbăneasa

Physical characteristics
- Mouth: Topolog
  - coordinates: 44.9648°N 24.3949°E
- Length: 9 km (5.6 mi)
- Basin size: 10 km^{2} (3.9 sq mi)

Basin features
- Progression: Topolog→ Olt→ Danube→ Black Sea

The Șerbăneasa is a right tributary of the river Topolog in Romania, itself a tributary of the river Olt. Its length is 9 km (5.6 mi) and its basin size is 10 km^{2} (3.9 sq mi).
