= Lodzova =

- Location within Romania

Location
- Country: Romania
- Counties: Tulcea County

Physical characteristics
- Source: Măcin Mountains
- Mouth: Taița
  - coordinates: 45.0232°N 28.4756°E
- Length: 15 km (9.3 mi)
- Basin size: 45 km^{2} (17 sq mi)

Basin features
- Progression: Taița→ Lake Babadag→ Lake Razim

The Lodzova is a left tributary of the river Taița in Romania. It flows into the Taița near Horia. Its length is 15 km (9.3 mi) and its basin size is 45 km^{2} (17 sq mi).
