= Râmnic =

- Location within Romania

Location
- Country: Romania
- Counties: Constanța County
- Villages: Râmnicu de Sus, Râmnicu de Jos, Pantelimon de Jos

Physical characteristics
- Mouth: Casimcea
  - location: Pantelimon de Jos
  - coordinates: 44.5812°N 28.3808°E
- Length: 20 km (12 mi)
- Basin size: 87 km^{2} (34 sq mi)

Basin features
- Progression: Casimcea→ Lake Tașaul
- Tributaries
  - left: Zandan
- River code: XV.1.10.1

The Râmnic is a left tributary of the river Casimcea in Romania. It flows into the Casimcea in Pantelimon de Jos. Its length is 20 km (12 mi) and its basin size is 87 km^{2} (34 sq mi).
