= Lacurile =

Lacurile may refer to several villages in Romania:

- Lacurile, a village in Ciofrângeni Commune, Argeș County
- Lacurile, a village in Bisoca Commune, Buzău County
