= Topolog Viaduct =

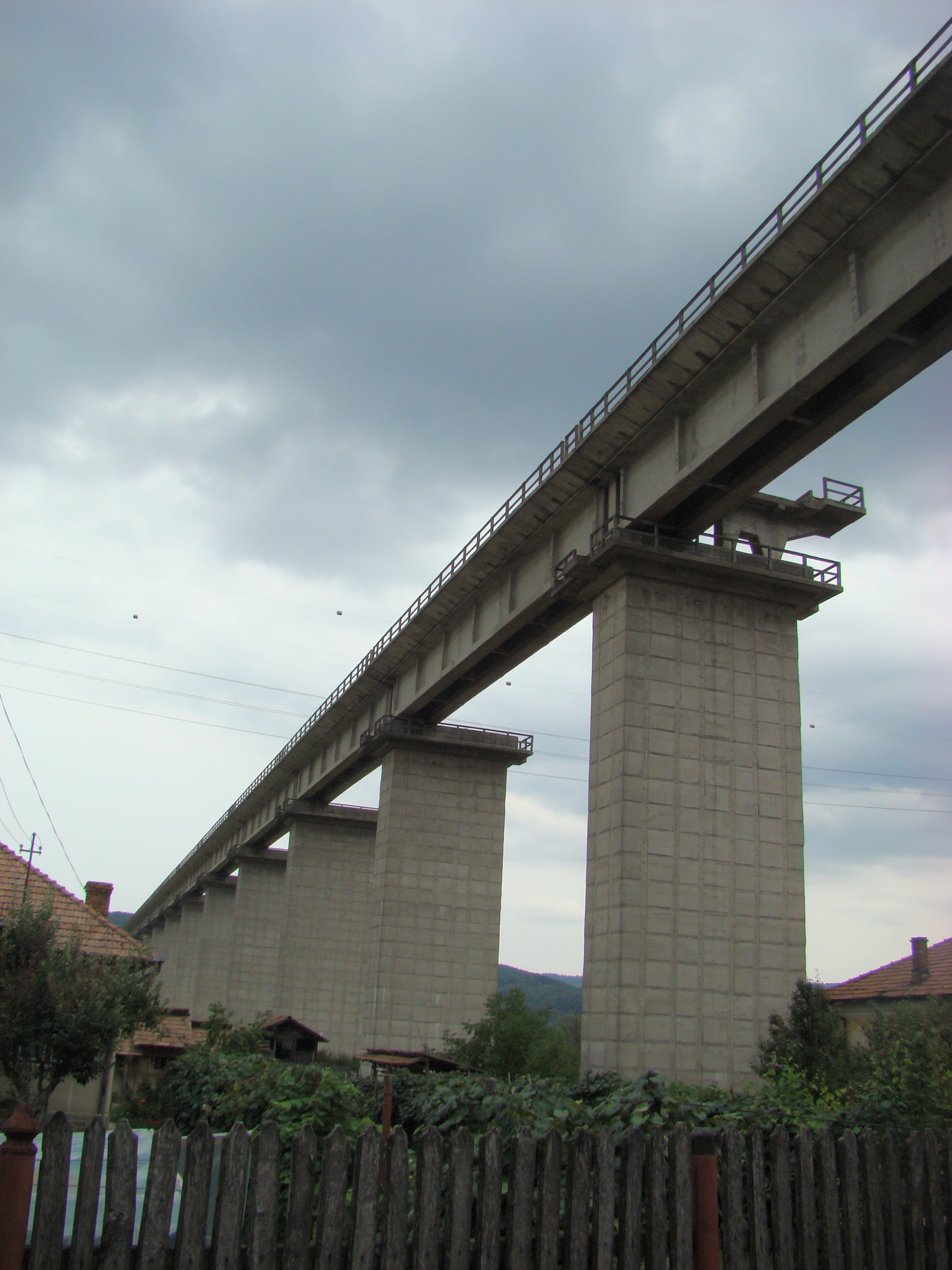
- The viaduct in Ciofrângeni
- Coordinates: 45.08946°N 24.55135°E
- Carries: railway track
- Crosses: Topolog
- Locale: east of Râmnicu Vâlcea

Characteristics
- Total length: 1,440 m

History
- Opened: 1989

The Topolog Viaduct is a viaduct east of Râmnicu Vâlcea over the river Topolog. The bridge was opened in 1989. It is crossed by an abandoned railway line that runs from Vâlcele, Argeș County to Bujoreni, Vâlcea County.

The viaduct is 1,440 m (4,720 ft) in length; it has a main height of around 50 m (160 ft), being constructed out of reinforced concrete.
