= Râmnicu =

Râmnicu may refer to several places in Romania:

- Râmnicu Vâlcea, the capital city of Vâlcea County
- Râmnicu Sărat, a city in Buzău County
- Râmnicu de Jos and Râmnicu de Sus, villages in Cogealac Commune, Constanța County

and to:

- Râmnic, a river in Tulcea and Constanța Counties
- Râmnicul Sărat, a river in Vrancea, Buzău, and Galați Counties
