= Ulmetum (castra) =

Fort in Moesia, Ancient Rome

- Castra of Pantelimon
- Location within Romania
- 44.5476°N 28.3417°E
- Location: Pantelimon, Constanța, Romania

History
- Founded: 2nd century AD

Site notes
- Elevation: 113 m (371 ft)
- Condition: Ruined

Ulmetum was a fort in the Roman province of Moesia near the present village of Pantelimonul de Sus.

The first mixed civil and military settlement dates from the 2nd c. AD. The walls were greatly strengthened at the end of the 4th century (during the reign of Emperor Theodosius I (379-395). It had an important strategic role to protect the road for the transport of goods between the Roman cities of Noviodunum and Durostorum.

After a period of abandonment due to the Hunnic attacks between the last quarter of the 5th century and the middle of the 6th century, it was partially rebuilt.

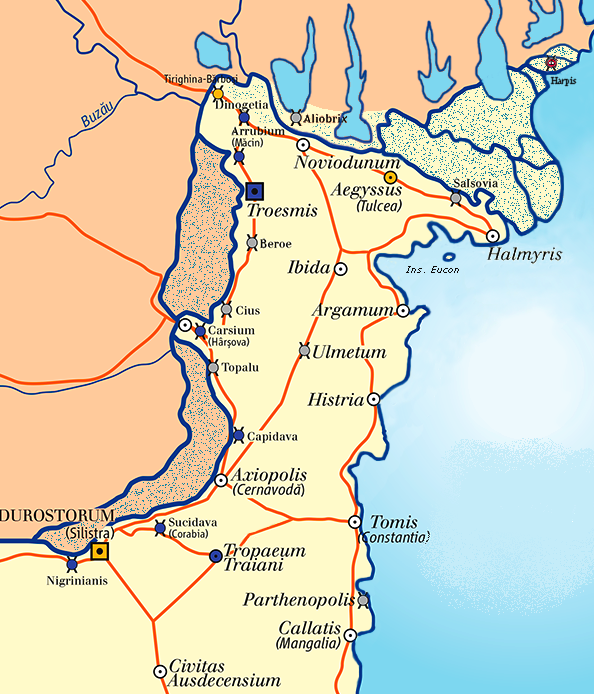
Eastern Moesia

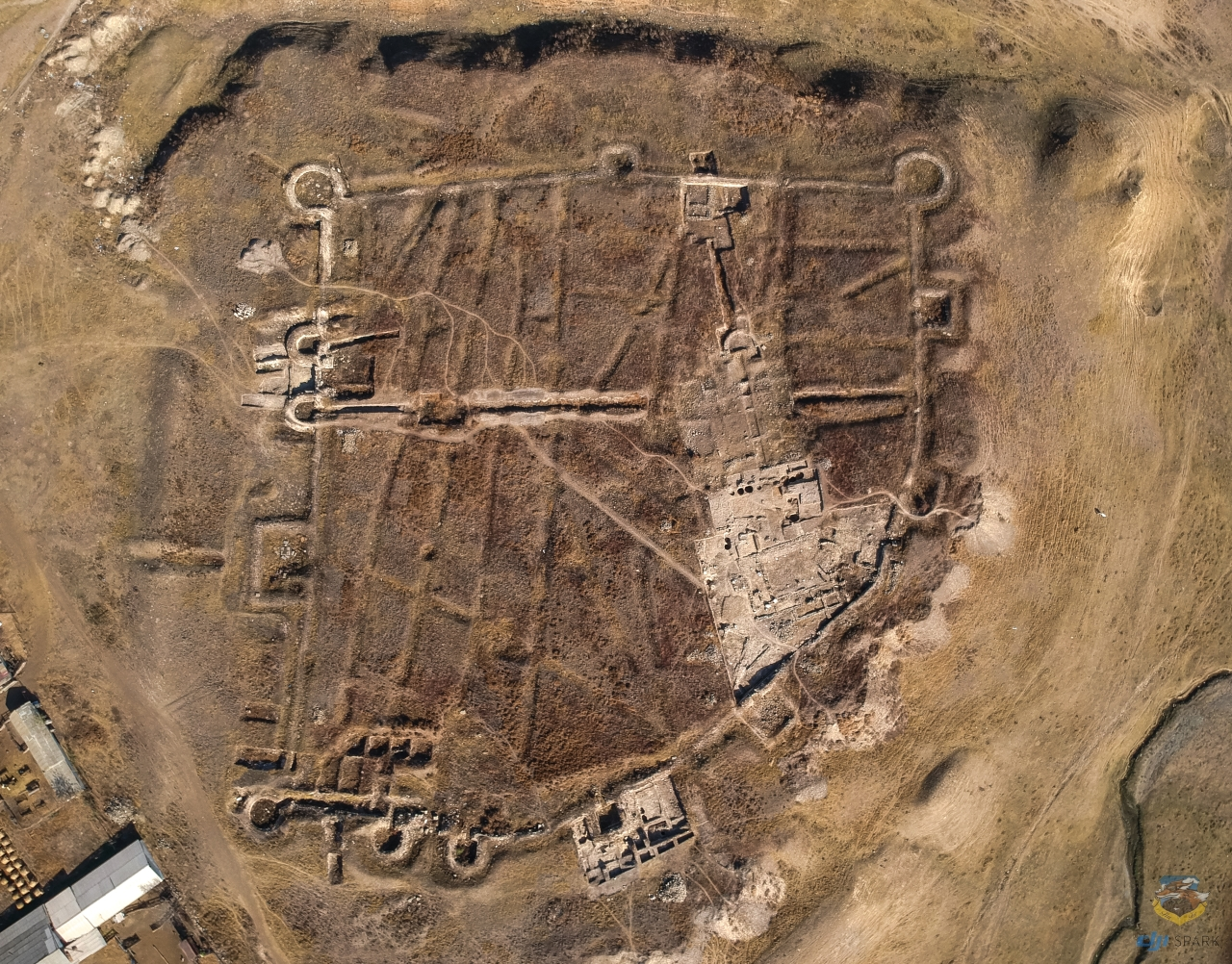
Ulmetum

== Gallery ==
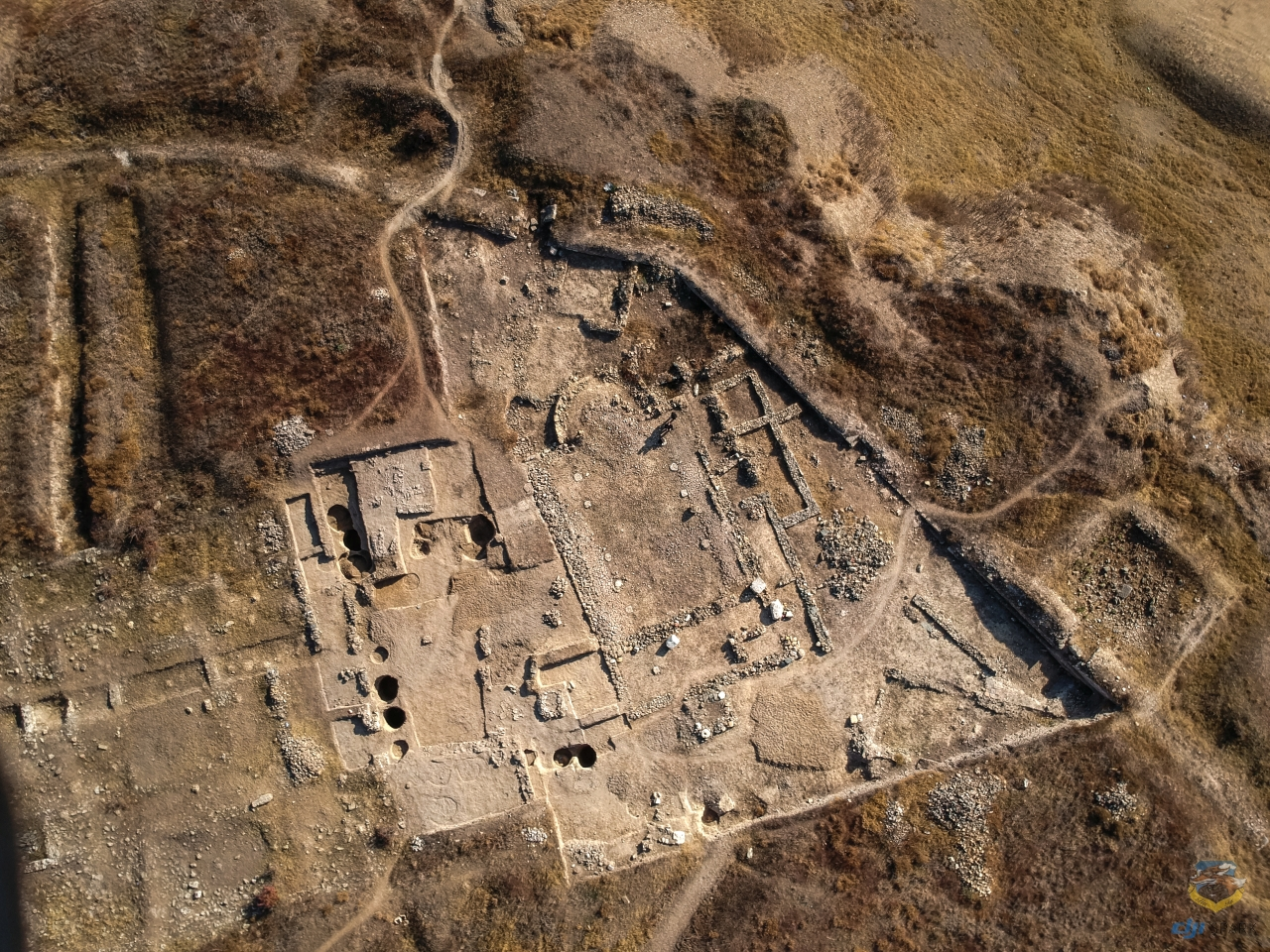

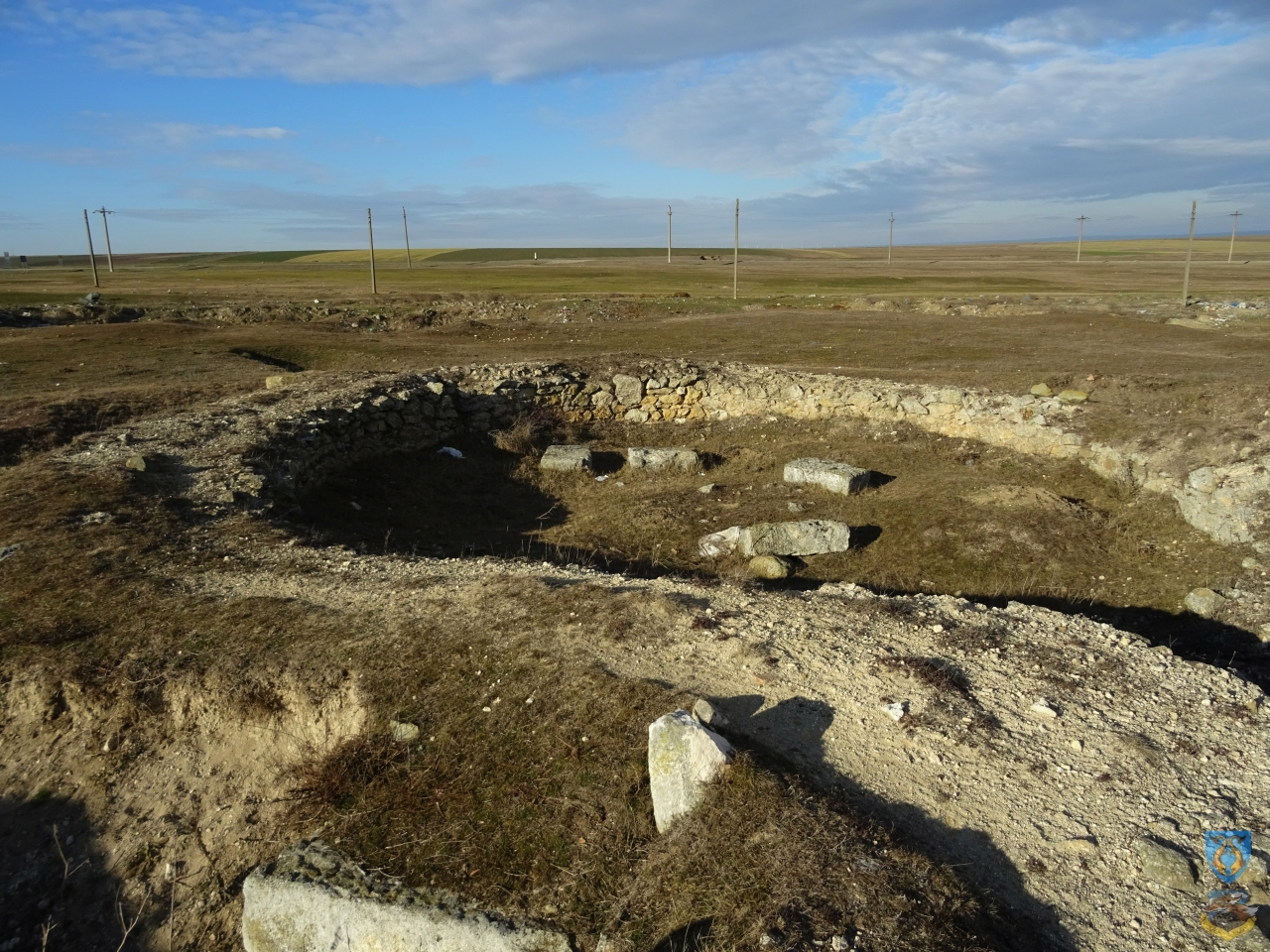

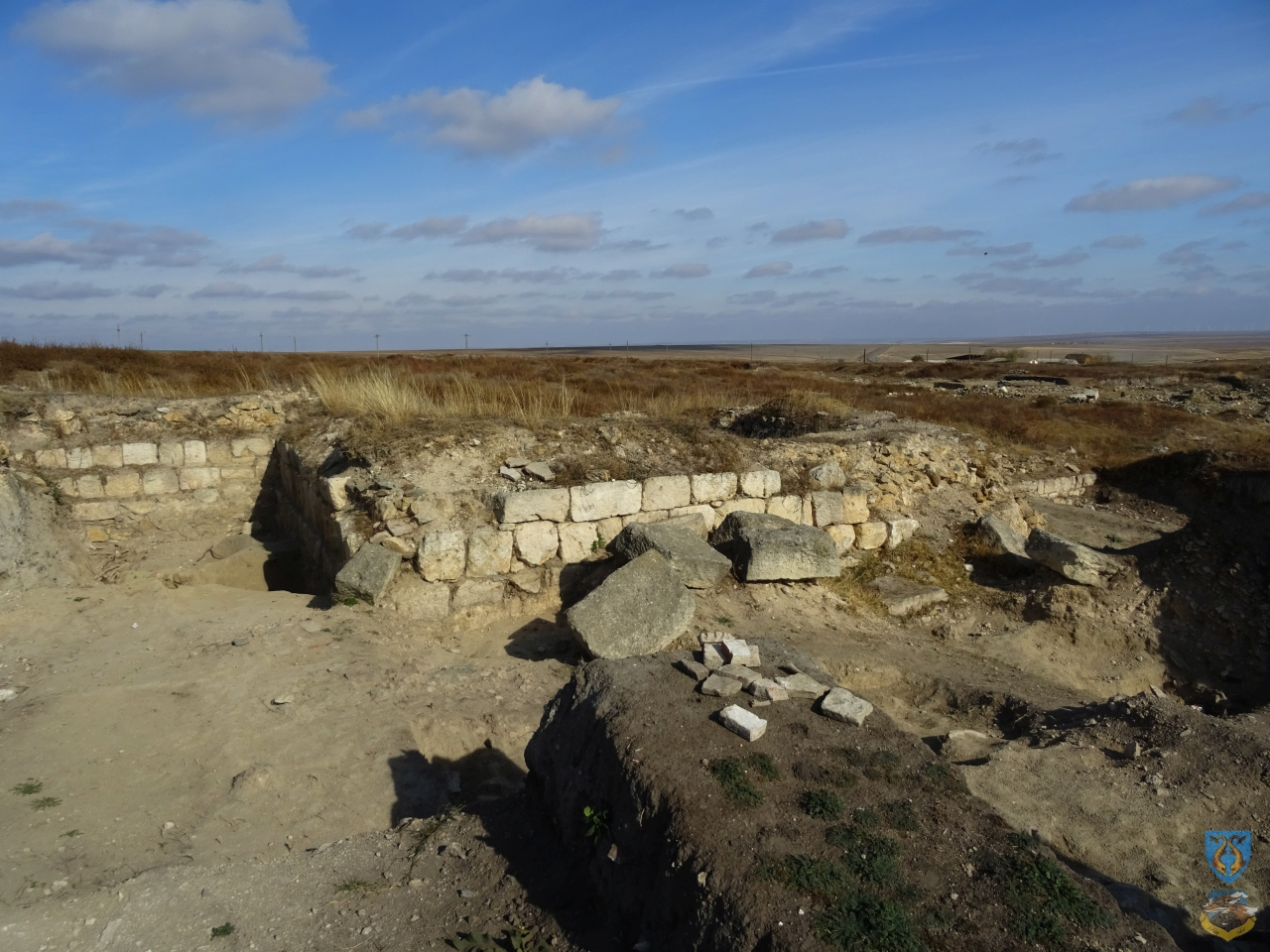

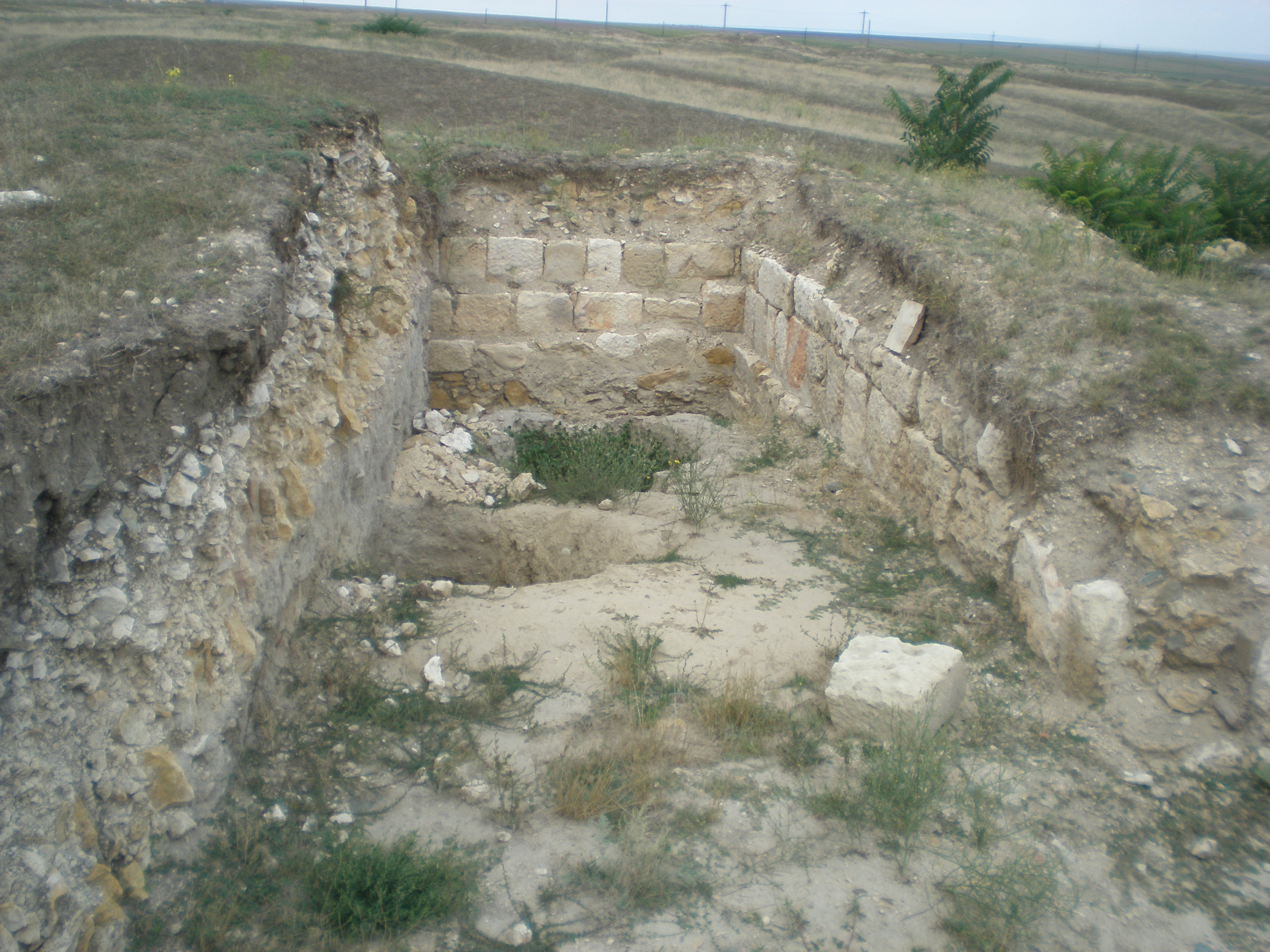

== See also ==
- List of castra
