= Saraiu =

- Commune
- Coat of arms

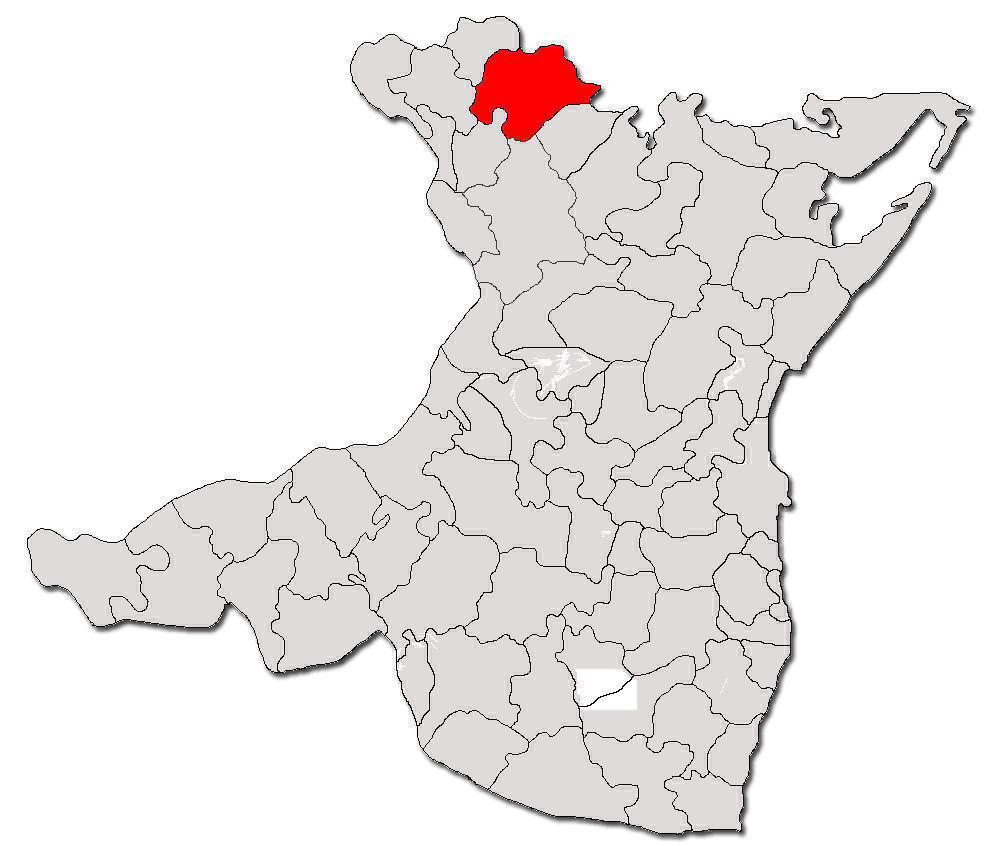
- Location in Constanța County

- Location in Romania
- Coordinates: 44°43′N 28°9′E
- Country: Romania
- County: Constanța
- Subdivisions: Saraiu, Dulgheru, Stejaru

Government
  - Mayor (2020–2024): Dorinela Irimia (PSD)
- Area: 113.57 km^{2} (43.85 sq mi)
- Population (2021-12-01): 1,082
  - Density: 9.527/km^{2} (24.68/sq mi)
- Time zone: UTC+02:00 (EET)
  - Summer (DST): UTC+03:00 (EEST)
- Vehicle reg.: CT
- Website: www.primaria-saraiu.ro

Saraiu (Romanian pronunciation: [saˈraju]) is a commune in Constanța County, Northern Dobruja, Romania.

The commune includes three villages:

- Saraiu (historical name: Turkish: Saray)
- Dulgheru (Turkish: Dülger)
- Stejaru (historical name: Carapelit, Turkish: Karapelit)

The territory of the commune also includes the former village of Albina (historical name: Balgiu), located at 44°43′36″N 28°12′00″E, disestablished by Presidential Decree in 1977.

== Demographics ==
At the 2011 census, Saraiu had 1,231 Romanians (99.84%), 2 others (0.16%).
