= Casimcea (river) =

- Location within Romania

Location
- Country: Romania
- Counties: Tulcea, Constanța

Physical characteristics
- Source: Războieni
  - elevation: 300 m (980 ft)
- Mouth: Lake Tașaul
  - coordinates: 44.3900°N 28.5530°E
- Length: 69 km (43 mi)
- Basin size: 740 km^{2} (290 sq mi)

Basin features
- River code: XV.1.10

The Casimcea is a river in southeastern Romania. Near the village Piatra, it discharges into Lake Tașaul, which was formerly connected with the Black Sea. It flows through the villages Războieni, Casimcea, Călugăreni, Nistorești, Pantelimon de Jos, Cheia, Casian, Palazu Mic and Piatra. It discharges into Lake Tașaul near Piatra. Its length is 69 km (43 mi) and its basin size is 740 km^{2} (290 sq mi).

== Tributaries ==
The following rivers are tributaries to the Casimcea (from source to mouth):

- Left: Valea cu Piatră, Râmnic, Grădina Mucova
- Right: Cartal, Pantelimon, Valea Seacă, Gura Dobrogei, Sitorman
