= Târgușor =

- Commune
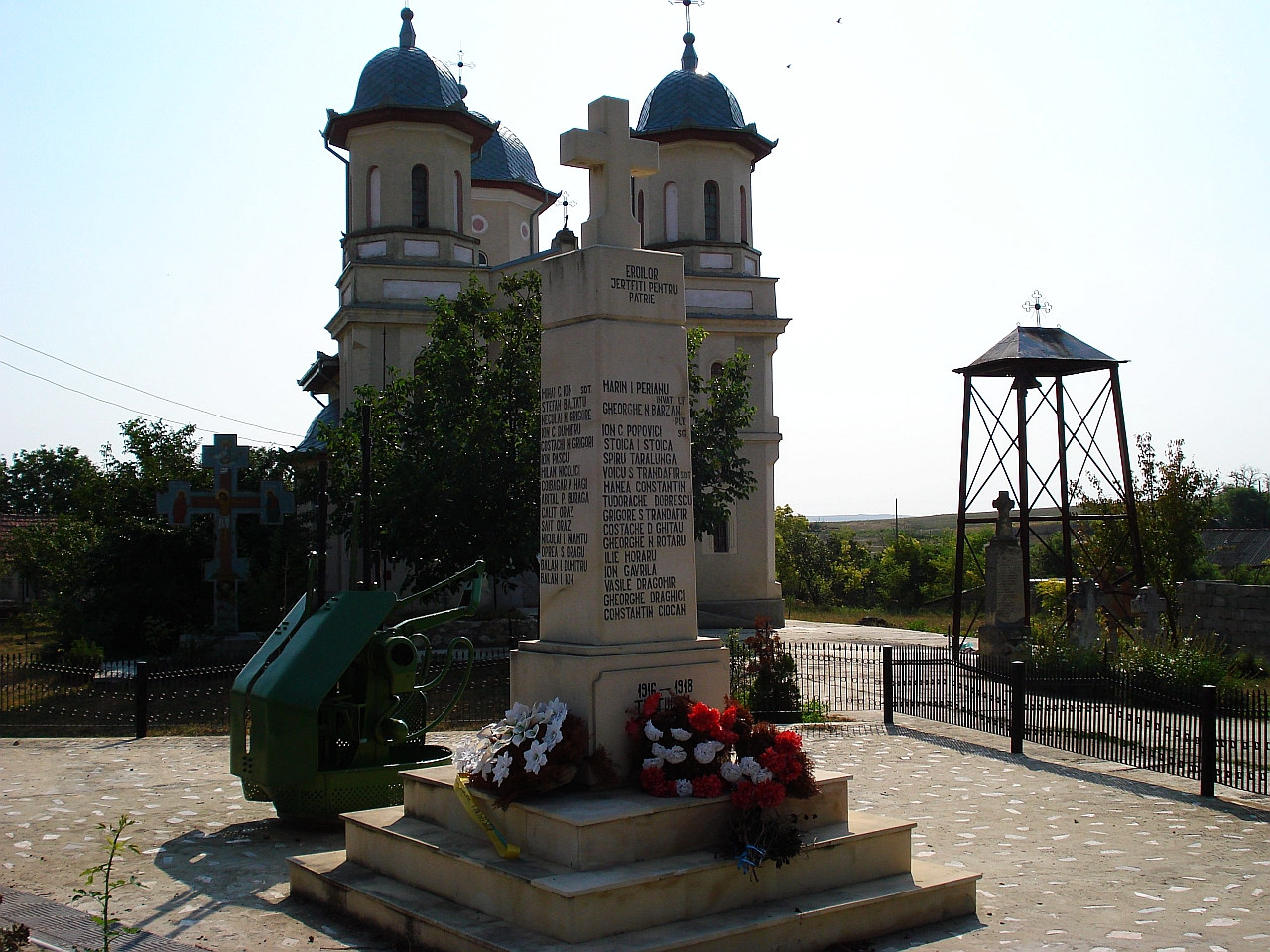
- World War I monument in Târgușor

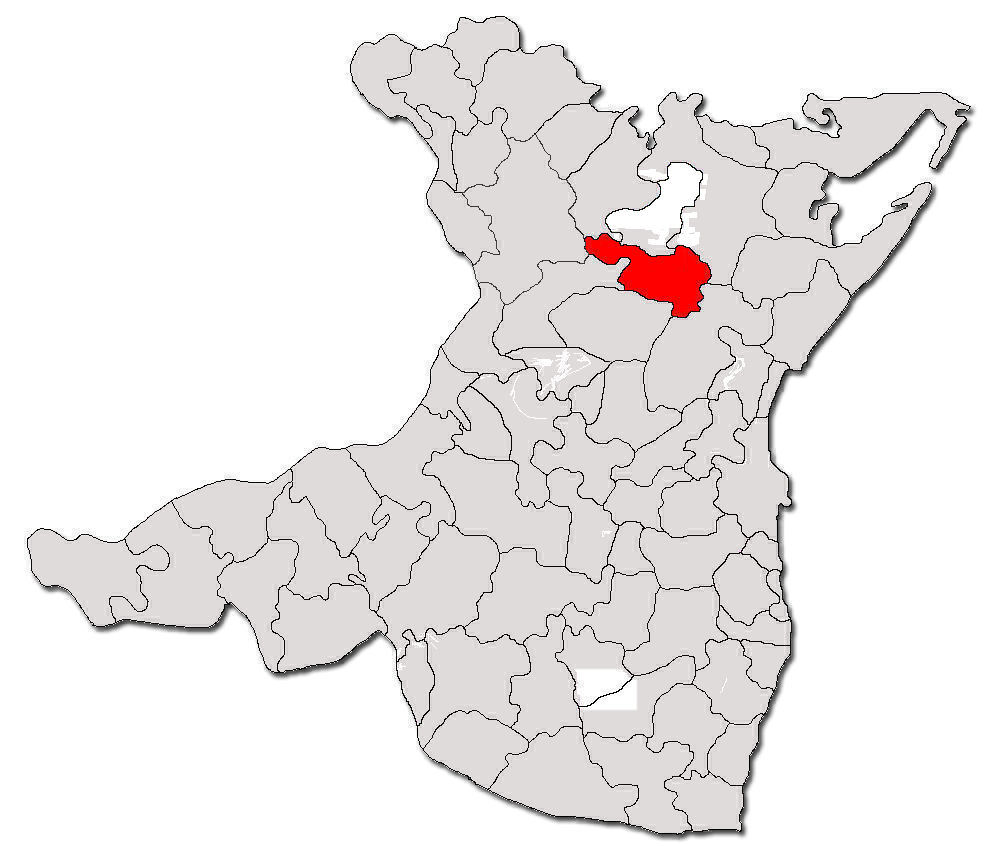
- Location in Constanța County

- Location in Romania
- Coordinates: 44°27′N 28°25′E
- Country: Romania
- County: Constanța
- Subdivisions: Târgușor, Mireasa

Government
  - Mayor (2020–2024): Mădălina Negru (PSD)
- Area: 169.54 km^{2} (65.46 sq mi)
- Elevation: 100 m (330 ft)
- Population (2021-12-01): 1,375
  - Density: 8.110/km^{2} (21.01/sq mi)
- Time zone: UTC+02:00 (EET)
  - Summer (DST): UTC+03:00 (EEST)
- Postal code: 907275
- Area code: +(41) x41
- Vehicle reg.: CT
- Website: primariatirgusor.ro

Târgușor (Romanian pronunciation: [tɨrɡuˈʃor]) is a commune in Constanța County, Northern Dobruja, Romania. It includes two villages:

- Târgușor (historical name: Pazarlia, Turkish: Pazarlı)
- Mireasa (historical names: Cheia; Ghelengic, Turkish: Gelincik)

The commune is located in the northern part of the county, 40 km (25 mi) northwest of the county seat, the port city of Constanța.

== Demographics ==
At the 2011 census, Târgușor had a population of 1,616; of those, 96,23% were Romanians. At the 2021 Romanian census, there were 1,375 inhabitants, 88,8% of which were Romanians.
