= Topolog (Danube) =

- Location within Romania

Location
- Country: Romania
- Counties: Tulcea, Constanța
- Villages: Topolog, Rahman, Stejaru, Saraiu

Physical characteristics
- Source: Casimcea Plateau
- Mouth: Lake Hazarlâc
  - coordinates: 44.7188°N 28.0659°E
- Length: 50 km (31 mi)
- Basin size: 342 km^{2} (132 sq mi)

Basin features
- Progression: Lake Hazarlâc→ Danube→ Black Sea
- Tributaries
  - left: Valea Dulgherului, Cișmelei, Bentu
- River code: XIV.1.47

The Topolog is a river in Dobruja, Romania, a right tributary of the Danube. It rises near the commune of Topolog, in the Casimcea Plateau of Tulcea County forming the Topolog Depression, which divides the Plateau in two parts: the Casimcea Plateau proper (to the east) and the Hârșova Plateau (to the west). Initially, it flows from northwest toward southeast, but eventually, it changes to east-west, spilling into Lake Hazarlâc, which is connected with the Danube. Its length is 50 km (31 mi) and its basin size is 342 km^{2} (132 sq mi).
