= Topologel =

- Location within Romania

Location
- Country: Romania
- Counties: Vâlcea County

Physical characteristics
- Mouth: Topolog
  - coordinates: 45.4611°N 24.4850°E
- Length: 9.5 km (5.9 mi)
- Basin size: 17 km^{2} (6.6 sq mi)

Basin features
- Progression: Topolog→ Olt→ Danube→ Black Sea

The Topologel is a right tributary of the river Topolog in Romania. Its length is 9.5 km (5.9 mi) and its basin size is 17 km^{2} (6.6 sq mi).
