= Vulturu, Constanța =

Vulturu
- Commune
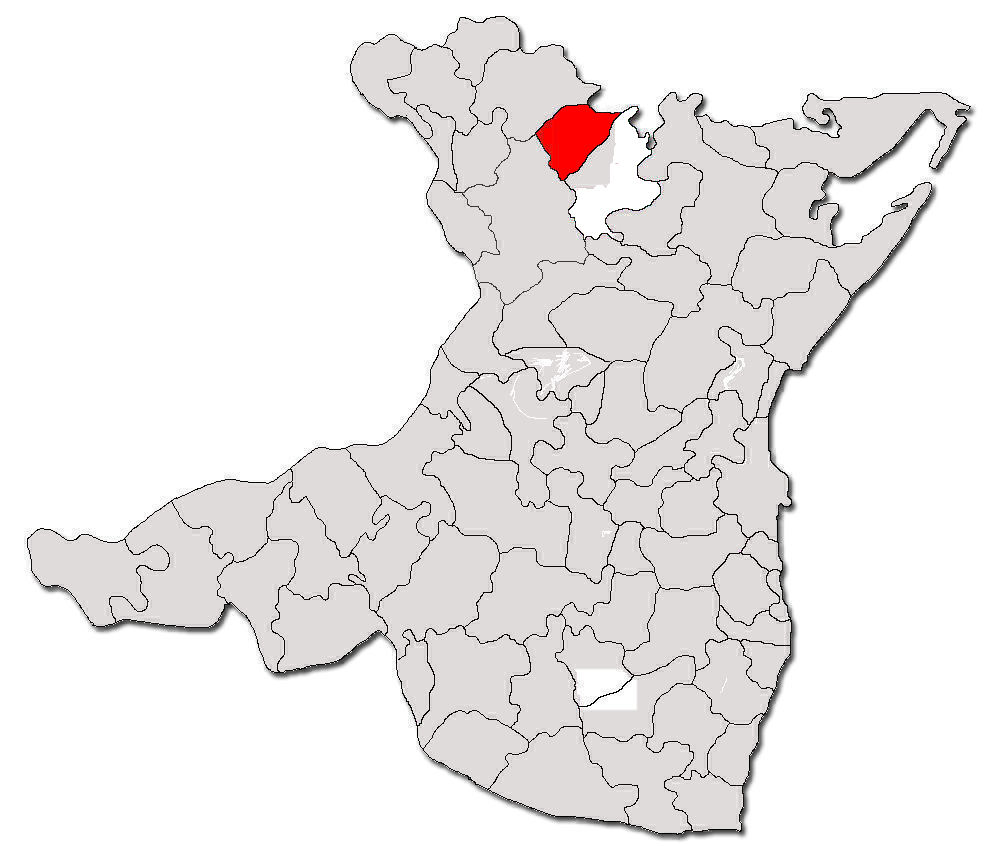
- Location in Constanța County

- Location in Romania
- Coordinates: 44°39′N 28°16′E
- Country: Romania
- County: Constanța

Government
  - Mayor (2020–2024): Eugen Marius Berbec (PSD)
- Area: 71.71 km^{2} (27.69 sq mi)
- Population (2021-12-01): 679
  - Density: 9.47/km^{2} (24.5/sq mi)
- Time zone: UTC+02:00 (EET)
  - Summer (DST): UTC+03:00 (EEST)
- Postal code: 907305
- Vehicle reg.: CT

Vulturu (Romanian pronunciation: [ˈvulturu]; historical name: Cartal, Turkish: Kartal) is a commune in Constanța County, Northern Dobruja, Romania, including the village with the same name.

== Demographics ==
At the 2011 census, Vulturu had 610 Romanians (100.00%).
