= Cumpăna (Topolog) =

Tributary of the river Topolog, Romania

- Location within Romania

Location
- Country: Romania
- Counties: Argeș County

Physical characteristics
- Mouth: Topolog
  - coordinates: 45.3664°N 24.4999°E
- Length: 12 km (7.5 mi)
- Basin size: 26 km^{2} (10 sq mi)

Basin features
- Progression: Topolog→ Olt→ Danube→ Black Sea
- Tributaries
  - left: Peneș

The Cumpăna is a left tributary of the river Topolog in Romania. It flows into the Topolog north of Sălătrucu. Its length is 12 km (7.5 mi) and its basin size is 26 km^{2} (10 sq mi).
