= Hamcearca =

- Commune
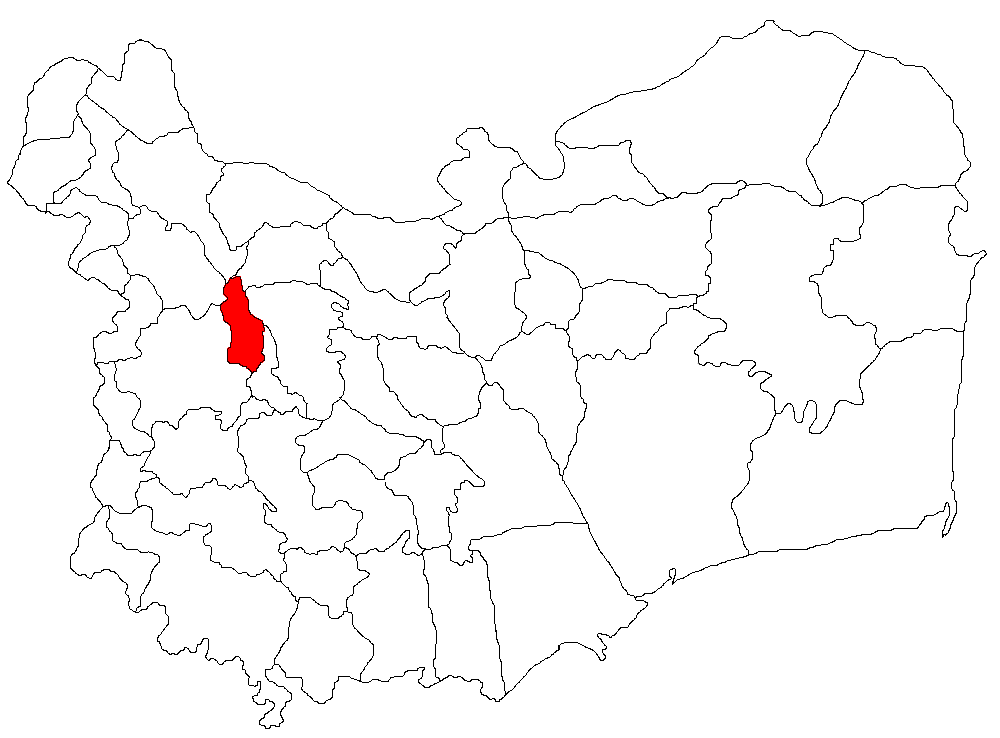
- Location in Tulcea County

- Location in Romania
- Coordinates: 45°07′N 28°22′E
- Country: Romania
- County: Tulcea
- Established: ca. 1800 (first attested)
- Subdivisions: Balabancea, Căprioara, Hamcearca, Nifon

Government
  - Mayor (2020–2024): Ion Acceleanu (PNL)
- Area: 198.29 km^{2} (76.56 sq mi)
- Population (2021-12-01): 1,334
  - Density: 6.7/km^{2} (17/sq mi)
- Time zone: EET/EEST (UTC+2/+3)
- Vehicle reg.: TL
- Website: www.primariahamcearca.ro

Hamcearca is a commune in Tulcea County, Northern Dobruja, Romania. It is composed of four villages: Balabancea, Căprioara (historical name: Geaferca-Rusă), Hamcearca and Nifon.

The commune formerly included Taiţa village, mainly Russian-inhabited prior to 1877, but this had been depopulated by 1930.

Reportedly, the commune's name derives from Hamcerencu, the surname of the brothers who settled there around 1812.
