= Grădina =

- Commune
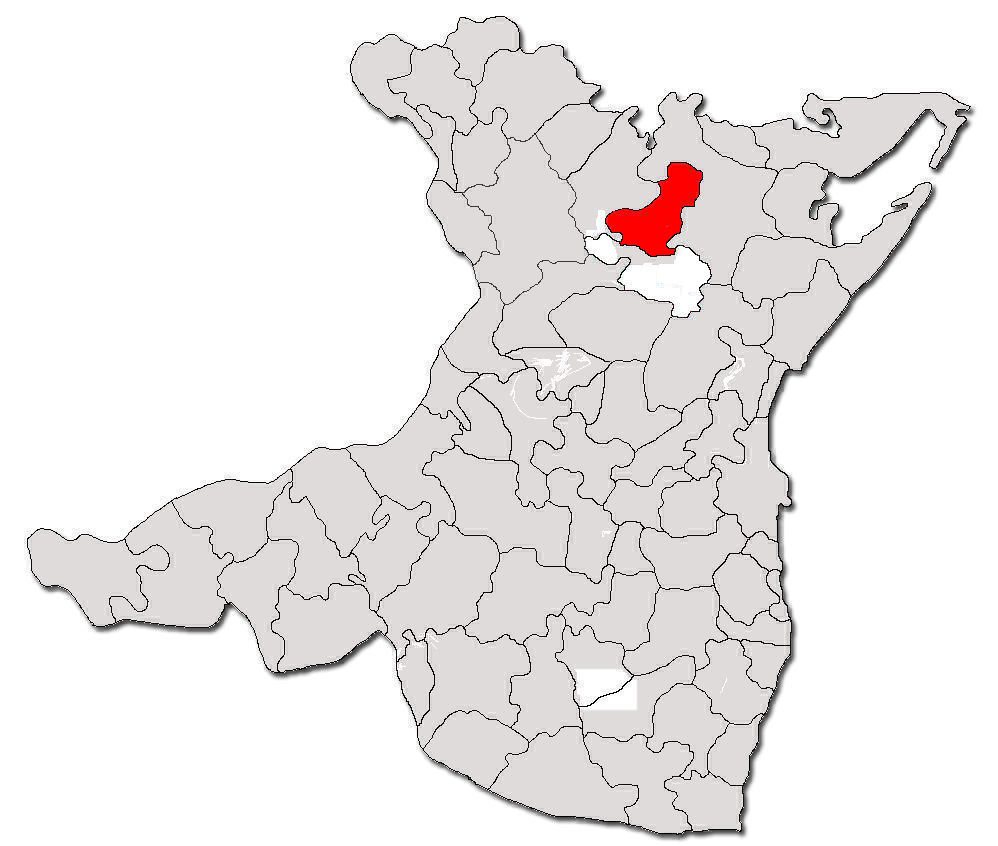
- Location in Constanța County

- Location in Romania
- Coordinates: 44°33′N 28°26′E
- Country: Romania
- County: Constanța
- Subdivisions: Grădina, Casian, Cheia

Government
  - Mayor (2020–2024): Gabriela Iacobici (PSD)
- Area: 71.54 km^{2} (27.62 sq mi)
- Population (2021-12-01): 940
  - Density: 13/km^{2} (34/sq mi)
- Time zone: UTC+02:00 (EET)
  - Summer (DST): UTC+03:00 (EEST)
- Vehicle reg.: CT
- Website: www.primariagradina.ro

Grădina (Romanian pronunciation: [ɡrəˈdina]) is a commune in Constanța County, Northern Dobruja, Romania.

The commune includes three villages:

- Grădina (historical names: Toxoff or Tocsof, Turkish: Dokuzsofu)
- Casian (historical name: Șeramet)
- Cheia (historical name: Chirișlic, Turkish: Kirişlik)

== Demographics ==
At the 2011 census, Grădina had 973 Romanians (94.93%), 3 Turks (0.29%), 47 Tatars (4.59%), 2 others (0.20%).
