= Topolog (Olt) =

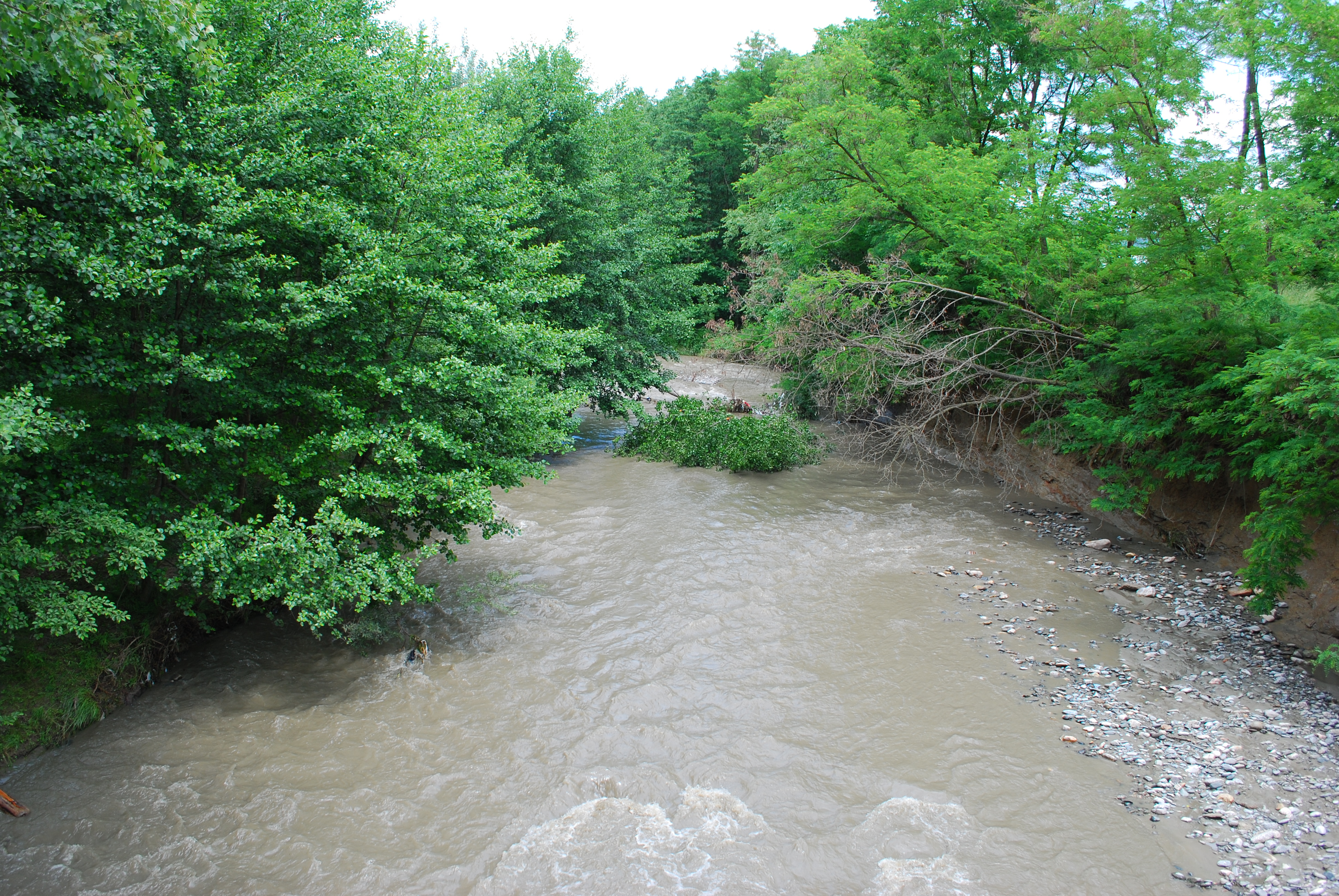

- Location within Romania

Location
- Country: Romania
- Counties: Argeș, Vâlcea

Physical characteristics
- Source: Făgăraș Mountains
  - location: confluence of headwaters Negoiu and Scara
  - elevation: 1,340 m (4,400 ft)
- Mouth: Olt
  - location: Ostroveni
  - coordinates: 44.9424°N 24.2647°E
  - elevation: 184 m (604 ft)
- Length: 111.5 km (69.3 mi)
- Basin size: 546.3 km^{2} (210.9 sq mi)

Basin features
- Progression: Olt→ Danube→ Black Sea

The Topolog is a left tributary of the river Olt in Romania. It discharges into the Olt (Băbeni Reservoir) in Ostroveni. It is formed by two source rivers that come from the southern slopes of the Făgăraș Mountains: Negoiu and Scara. It flows through the communes Sălătrucu, Șuici, Cepari, Tigveni, Ciofrângeni, Poienarii de Argeș, Milcoiu, Nicolae Bălcescu and Galicea. Including its longest source river, Negoiu, its total length is 111.5 km (69.3 mi) and its basin size is 546.3 km^{2} (210.9 sq mi). For much of its length it forms the border between the counties Argeș and Vâlcea.

== Tributaries ==
The following rivers are tributaries to the river Topolog (from source to mouth):

- Left: Negoiu, Izvorul Podeanului, Marginea, Cumpăna, Valea Plopilor, Valea Satului
- Right: Scara, Mâzgavu, Izvorul Coastelor, Topologel, Cărpeniș, Bădislava, Ciutești, Șerbăneasa
