= Nicolae Bălcescu, Vâlcea =

Nicolae Bălcescu
- Commune
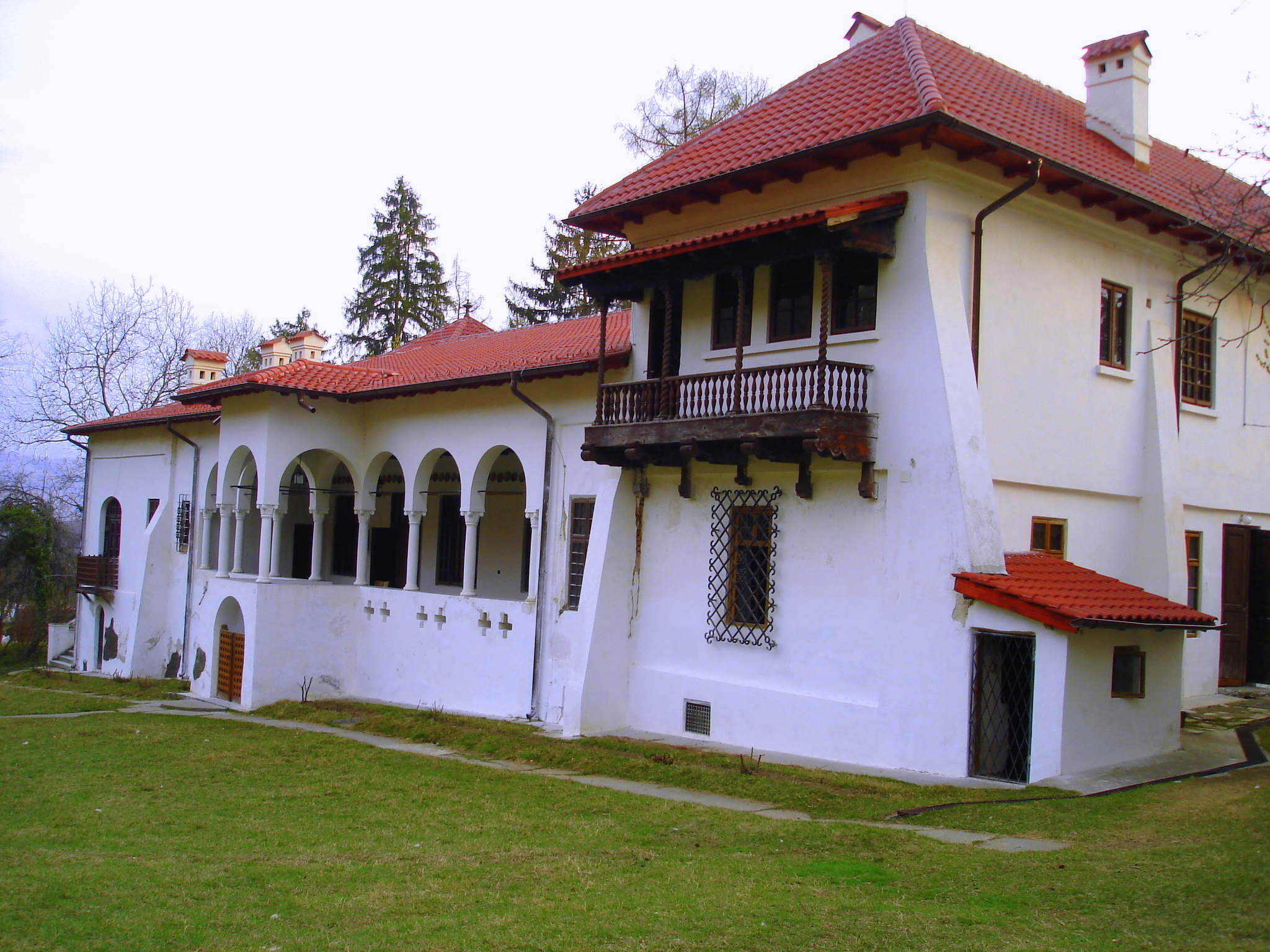
- Nicolae Bălcescu memorial museum in Valea Bălcească

- Coat of arms

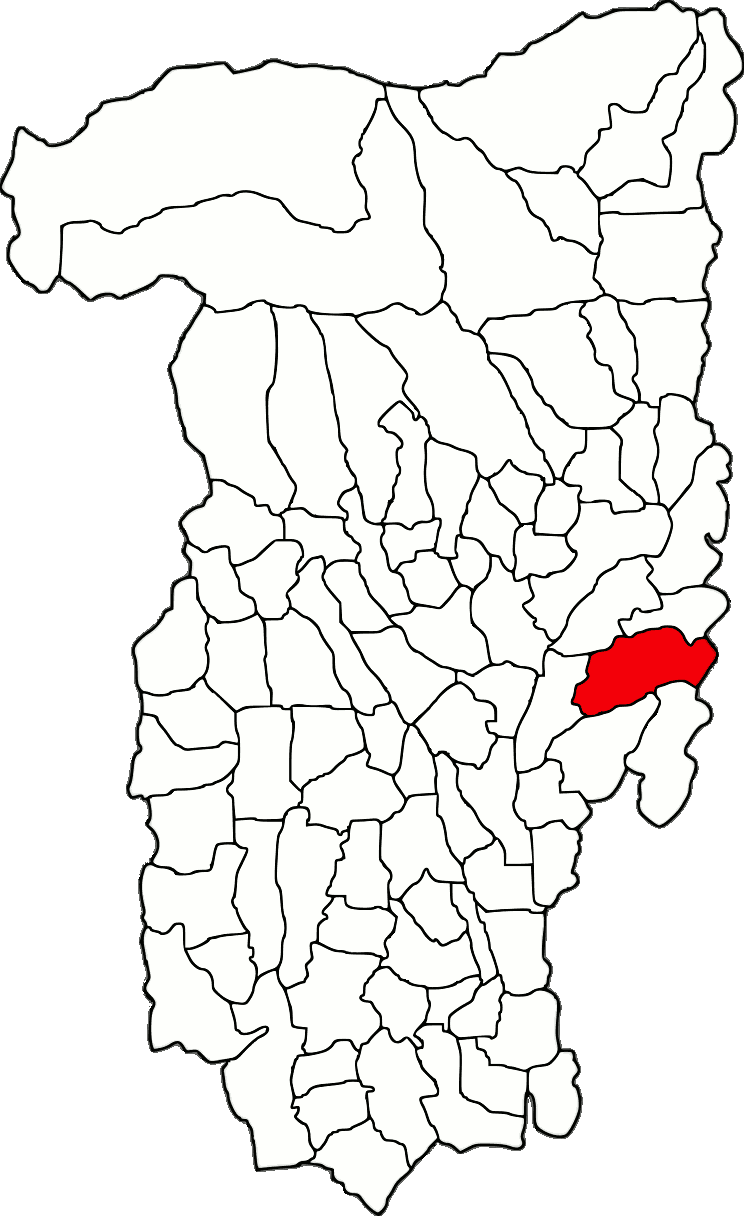
- Location in Vâlcea County

- Location in Romania
- Coordinates: 45°00′N 24°26′E
- Country: Romania
- County: Vâlcea

Government
  - Mayor (2024–2028): Landor Moșteanu (PSD)
- Area: 77.08 km^{2} (29.76 sq mi)
- Elevation: 286 m (938 ft)
- Population (2021-12-01): 3,253
  - Density: 42.20/km^{2} (109.3/sq mi)
- Time zone: UTC+02:00 (EET)
  - Summer (DST): UTC+03:00 (EEST)
- Postal code: 247429
- Area code: +(40) 250
- Vehicle reg.: VL
- Website: nicolae-balcescu.ro

Nicolae Bălcescu is a commune located in Vâlcea County, Muntenia, Romania. It is composed of seventeen villages: Bănești, Corbii din Vale, Dosu Râului, Ginerica, Gâltofani, Linia Hanului, Măzăraru, Mângureni, Pleșoiu, Popești, Predești, Rotărăști (the commune centre), Schitu, Șerbăneasa, Tufanii, Valea Bălcească, and Valea Viei. The commune received its current name in 1968, when the former communes of Stoiceni and Bălcești were merged.

The commune is named after the 19th century Romanian historian and revolutionary Nicolae Bălcescu.
