= Măcin Mountains =

Protected area in Romania

Coordinates: 45°12′36″N 28°21′21″E

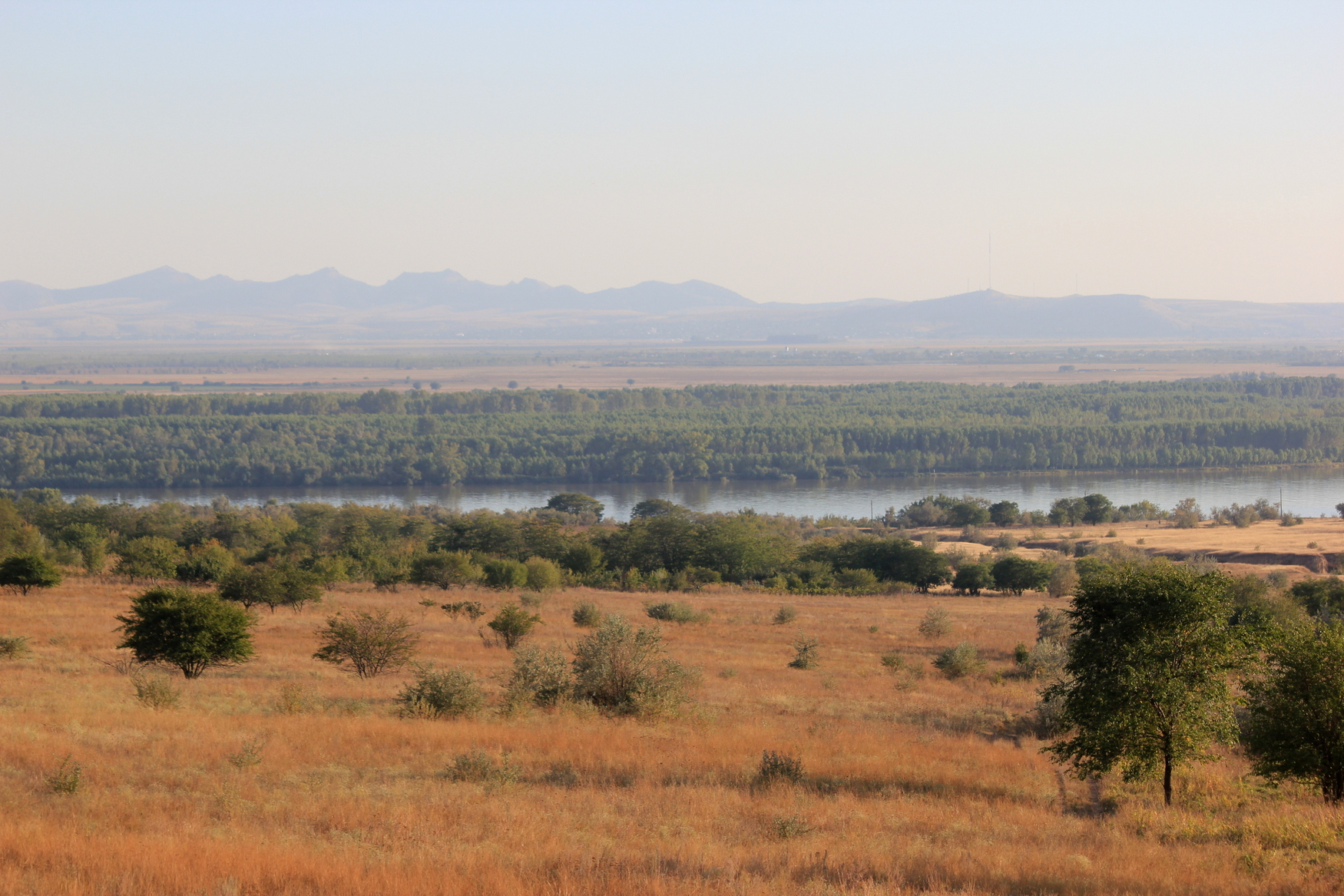
The Danube and Măcin Mountains in the background

The Măcin Mountains (Romanian: Munții Măcin) is a mountain range in Tulcea County, Romania. Part of the Northern Dobruja Massif, they are located between Danube River to the north and west, Taița River and Culmea Niculițelului to the east and Casimcea Plateau to the south. Seen from the Danube, they seem only low hills. However, they are a mountainous region.

The Măcin Mountains are one of the oldest in Romania, being formed in the second part of the Paleozoic, in the Carboniferous and Permian, during the Hercynian orogeny. The predominant rock is granite. Erosion (caused by the difference of temperature) has created steep slopes, with the aspect of ruins.

They are divided in Culmea Măcinului (the southern part) and Culmea Pricopanului (the northern part). The highest peak is Țuțuiatu (also called Greci), which has a height of 467 meters. Other important peaks are Priopcea Hill (410 m) and Muntele lui Iacob (Iacob's Mountain – 341 m).

== Vegetation and avifauna ==
Besides the Balkanic and sub-Mediterranean forests, the Măcin Mountains also have a considerable swathe of steppe, making it a delightful site for birds. The area is a staging point for various migratory bird species, especially raptors, who arrive here in autumn. The region is home to species such as European turtle dove, red-rumped swallow, common and isabelline wheatears, ortolan bunting and several others. Măcin Mountains are also the hunting grounds of the long-legged buzzard (Buteo rufinus), one of Europe's largest buzzards. It shares the mountains with other birds of prey such as short-toed eagle, booted eagle, Levant sparrowhawk and saker falcon.

== See also ==
- Măcin
