= Taița =

- Location within Romania

Location
- Country: Romania
- Counties: Tulcea County
- Villages: Nifon, Hamcearca, Balabancea, Horia, Izvoarele, Nicolae Bălcescu, Mihai Bravu

Physical characteristics
- Source: Măcin Mountains
- Mouth: Lake Babadag
  - coordinates: 44.9299°N 28.7328°E
- Length: 57 km (35 mi)
- Basin size: 591 km^{2} (228 sq mi)

Basin features
- Progression: Lake Babadag→ Lake Razim
- Tributaries
  - left: Pârlita, Islam, Lodzova, Tăița
  - right: Curături, Valea Purcăreți, Valea Vinului, Crapcea

The Taița is a river in Tulcea County, Romania. North of the town Babadag it discharges into Lake Babadag, which is connected with Lake Razim, a former lagoon of the Black Sea. Its length is 57 km (35 mi) and its basin size is 591 km^{2} (228 sq mi).
