= Ciofrângeni =

- Commune
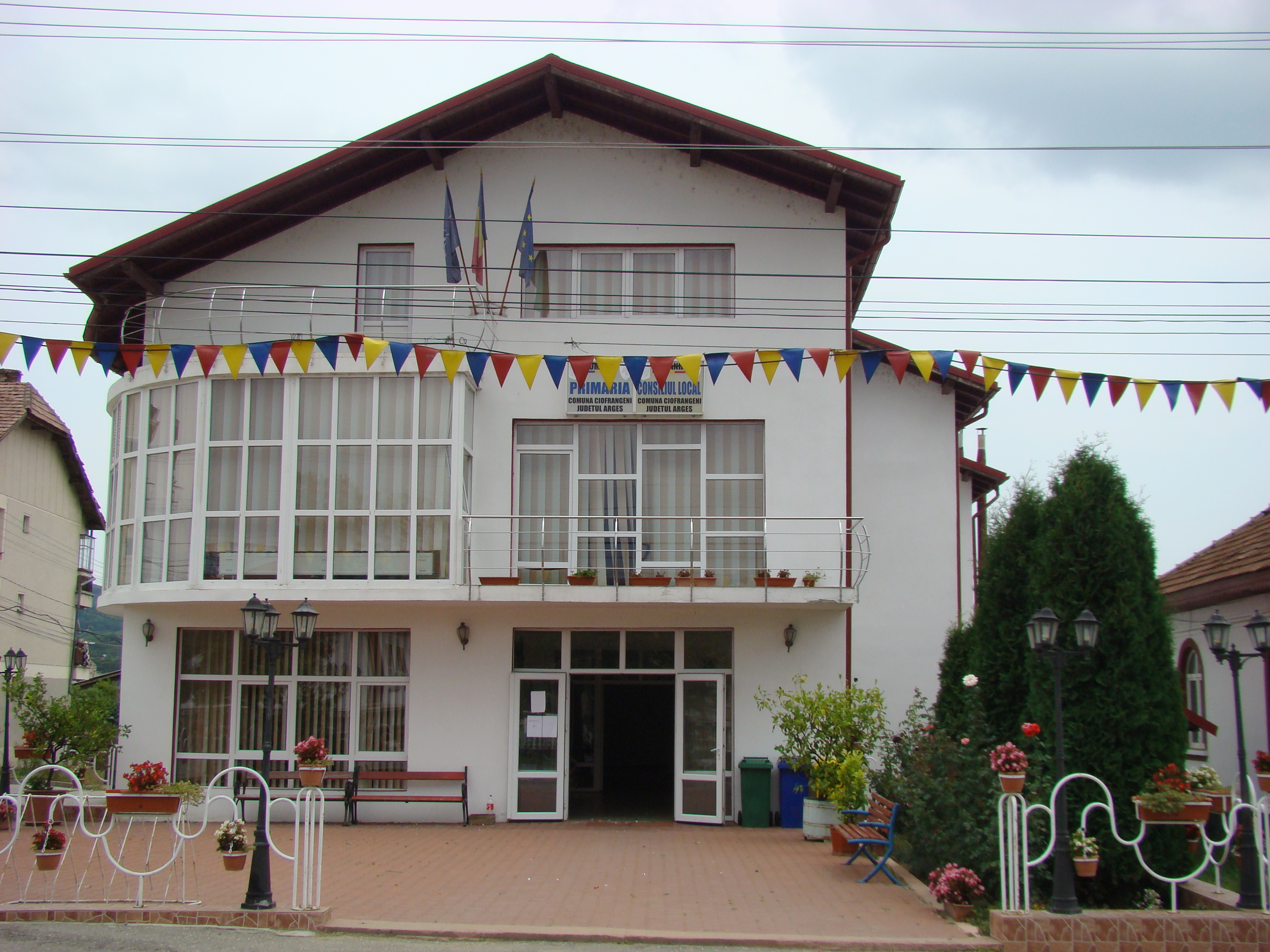
- Ciofrângeni townhall

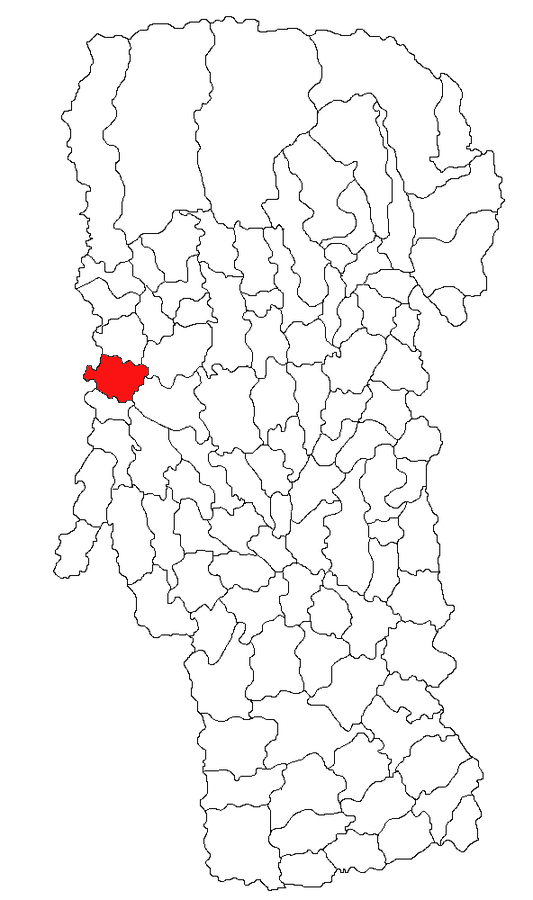
- Location in Argeș County

- Location in Romania
- Coordinates: 45°5′N 24°32′E
- Country: Romania
- County: Argeș

Government
  - Mayor (2024–2028): Dorin-Florin Panțeru (PSD)
- Area: 43.35 km^{2} (16.74 sq mi)
- Elevation: 374 m (1,227 ft)
- Population (2021-12-01): 1,980
  - Density: 45.7/km^{2} (118/sq mi)
- Time zone: UTC+02:00 (EET)
  - Summer (DST): UTC+03:00 (EEST)
- Postal code: 117250
- Area code: +(40) 248
- Vehicle reg.: AG
- Website: www.cjarges.ro/en/web/ciofrangeni

Ciofrângeni is a commune in Argeș County, Muntenia, Romania. It is composed of five villages: Burluși, Ciofrângeni, Lacurile, Piatra, and Schitu-Matei.

The commune lies in the Wallachian Plain, on the banks of the Topolog River. It is located in the western part of Argeș County, 43 km (27 mi) northwest of the county seat, Pitești, on the border with Vâlcea County.

Ciofrângeni is crossed by the national road DN73C, which starts in Câmpulung, runs through Curtea de Argeș (16 km (9.9 mi) to the east), and ends in Râmnicu Vâlcea (21 km (13 mi) to the west).
