= Pantelimon, Constanța =

Pantelimon
- Commune
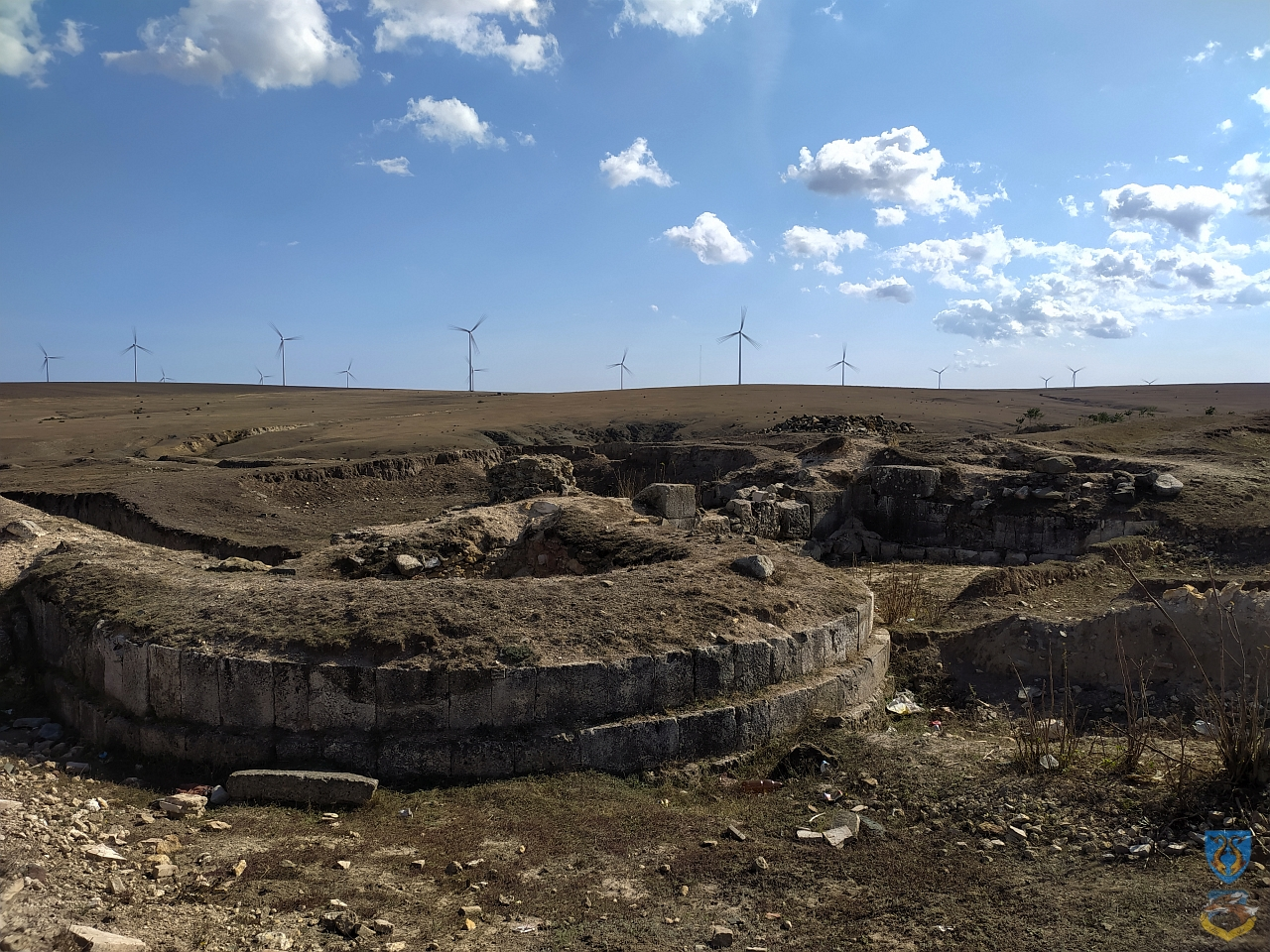
- Ulmetum fortress in Pantelimon

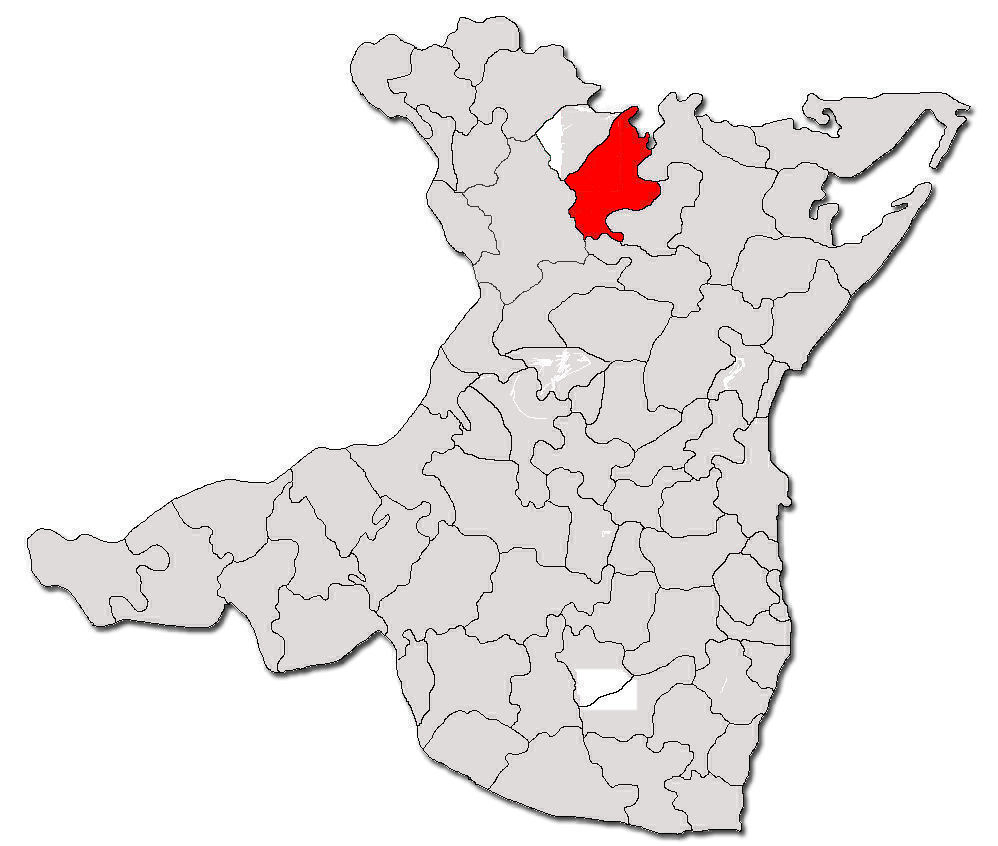
- Location in Constanța County

- Location in Romania
- Coordinates: 44°33′N 28°20′E
- Country: Romania
- County: Constanța
- Subdivisions: Pantelimon, Călugăreni, Nistorești, Pantelimon de Jos, Runcu

Government
  - Mayor (2020–2024): Costel Armășescu (PNL)
- Area: 134.83 km^{2} (52.06 sq mi)
- Elevation: 142 m (466 ft)
- Population (2021-12-01): 1,632
  - Density: 12.10/km^{2} (31.35/sq mi)
- Time zone: UTC+02:00 (EET)
  - Summer (DST): UTC+03:00 (EEST)
- Postal code: 907230
- Area code: +40 x41
- Vehicle reg.: CT
- Website: www.pantelimonct.ro

Pantelimon (Romanian pronunciation: [panteliˈmon]) is a commune in Constanța County, Northern Dobruja, Romania.

The commune includes five villages:

- Pantelimon (historical name: Pantelimon de Sus until 1968)
- Călugăreni (historical name: Caceamac, Turkish: Kaçamak)
- Nistorești (historical name: Cuciuc-Chioi, Turkish: Küçük Köy)
- Pantelimon de Jos
- Runcu (historical name: Terzichioi, Turkish: Terziköy)

== Demographics ==
Historical population
Year	Pop.	±%
2002	1,894	—
2011	1,608	−15.1%
2021	1,632	+1.5%
Source: Census data

At the 2011 census, Pantelimon had 1,608 inhabitants, of which 88.56% were Romanians. At the 2021 census, the commune had a population of 1,632; of those, 88.54% were Romanians and 1.41% Roma.
