= Northern Dobruja =

Northern Dobruja Dobrogea de Nord / Dobrogea (Romanian)
- Historical region of Romania
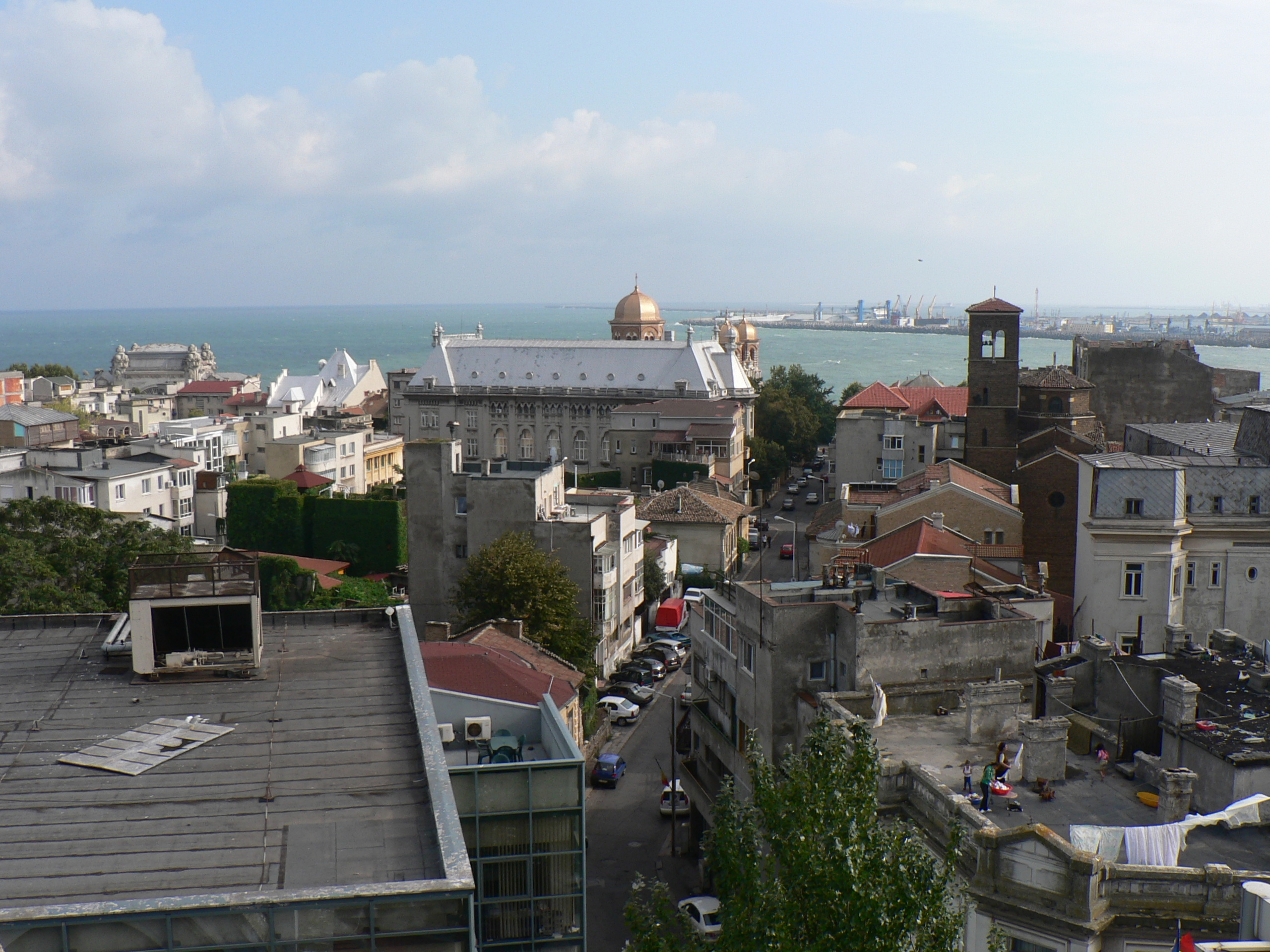
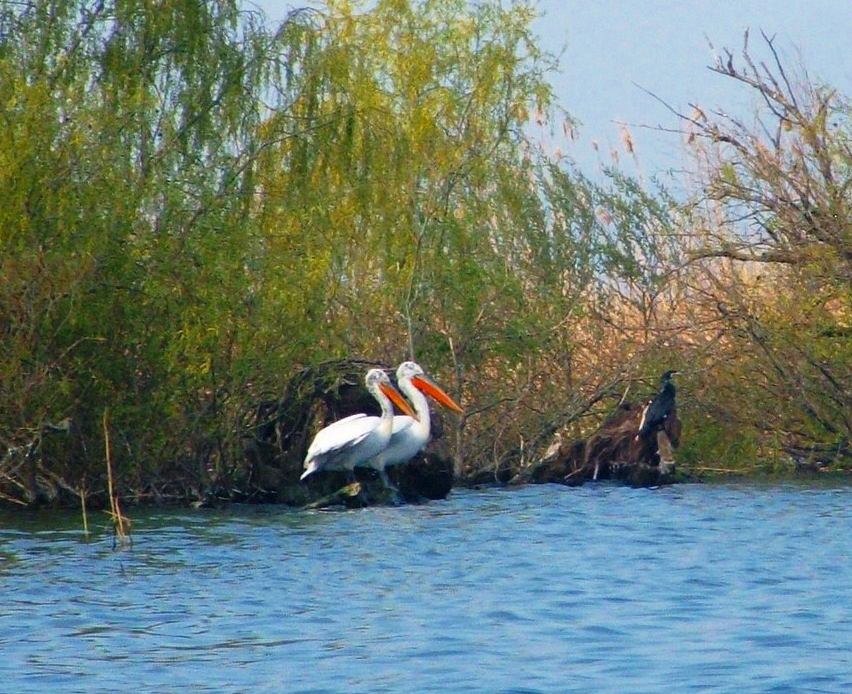
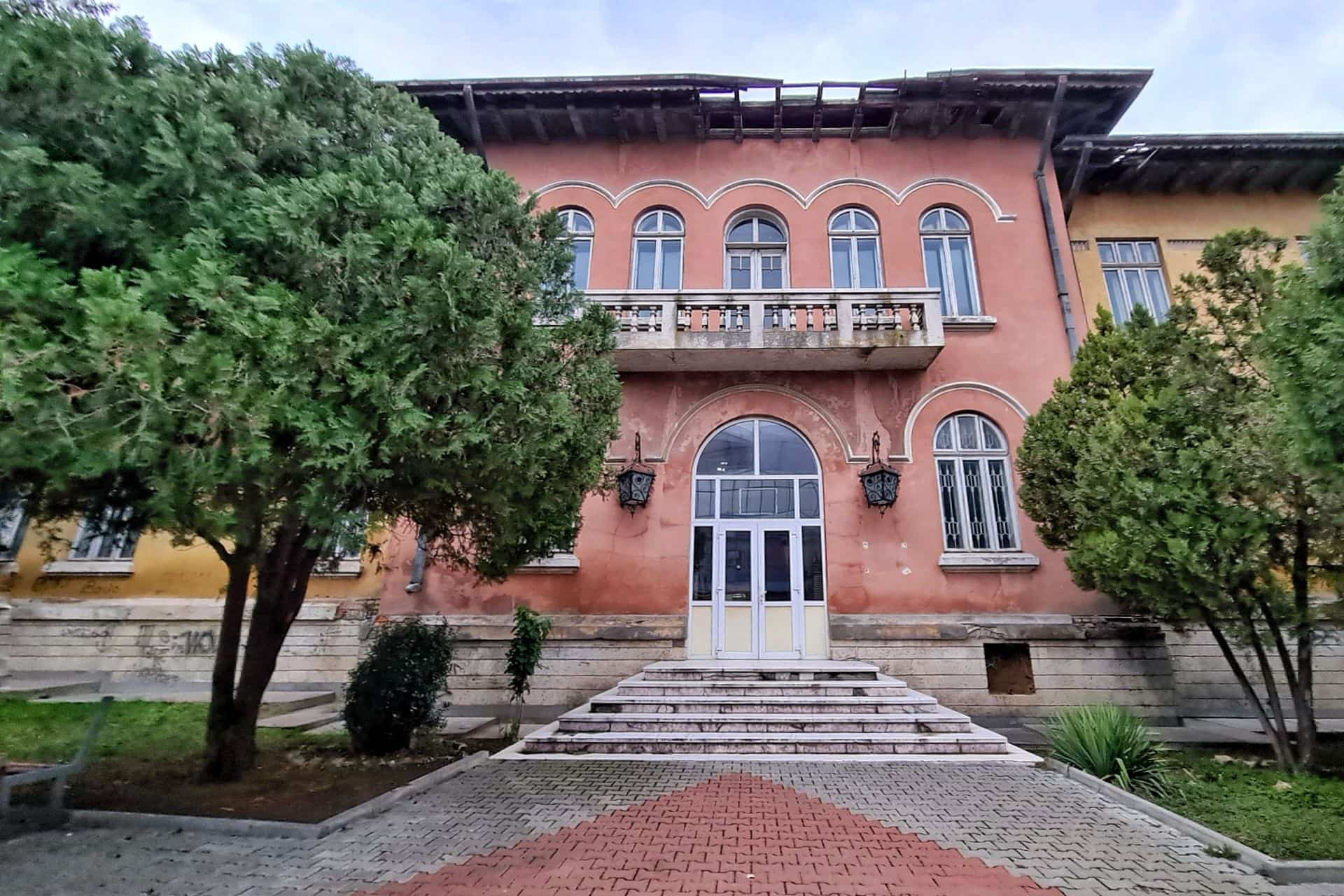
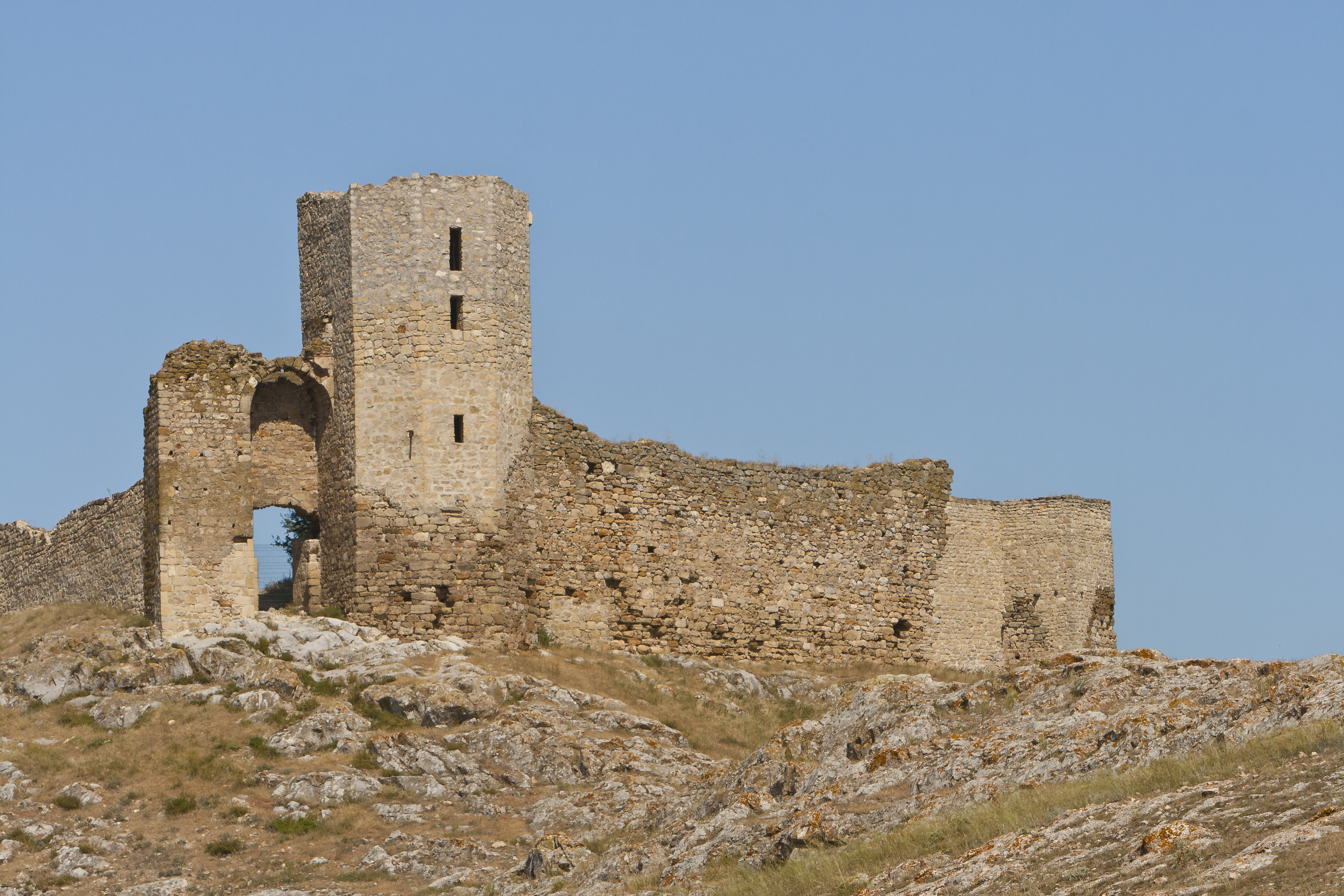
- Constanța Danube Delta Medgidia Art Museum Enisala Fortress

- Coat of arms

- Dobruja Muntenia, Western Moldavia, Oltenia, Bukovina, Transylvania, Banat and Crișana
- Country: Romania
- Largest city: Constanța

Population (2021)
  - Total: 849,352
- Time zone: UTC+2 (EET)
  - Summer (DST): UTC+3 (EEST)

Northern Dobruja (Romanian: Dobrogea de Nord or simply Dobrogea; Bulgarian: Северна Добруджа, Severna Dobrudzha) is the part of Dobruja within the borders of Romania. It lies between the lower Danube River and the Black Sea, bordered in the south by Southern Dobruja, which is a part of Bulgaria.

== History ==
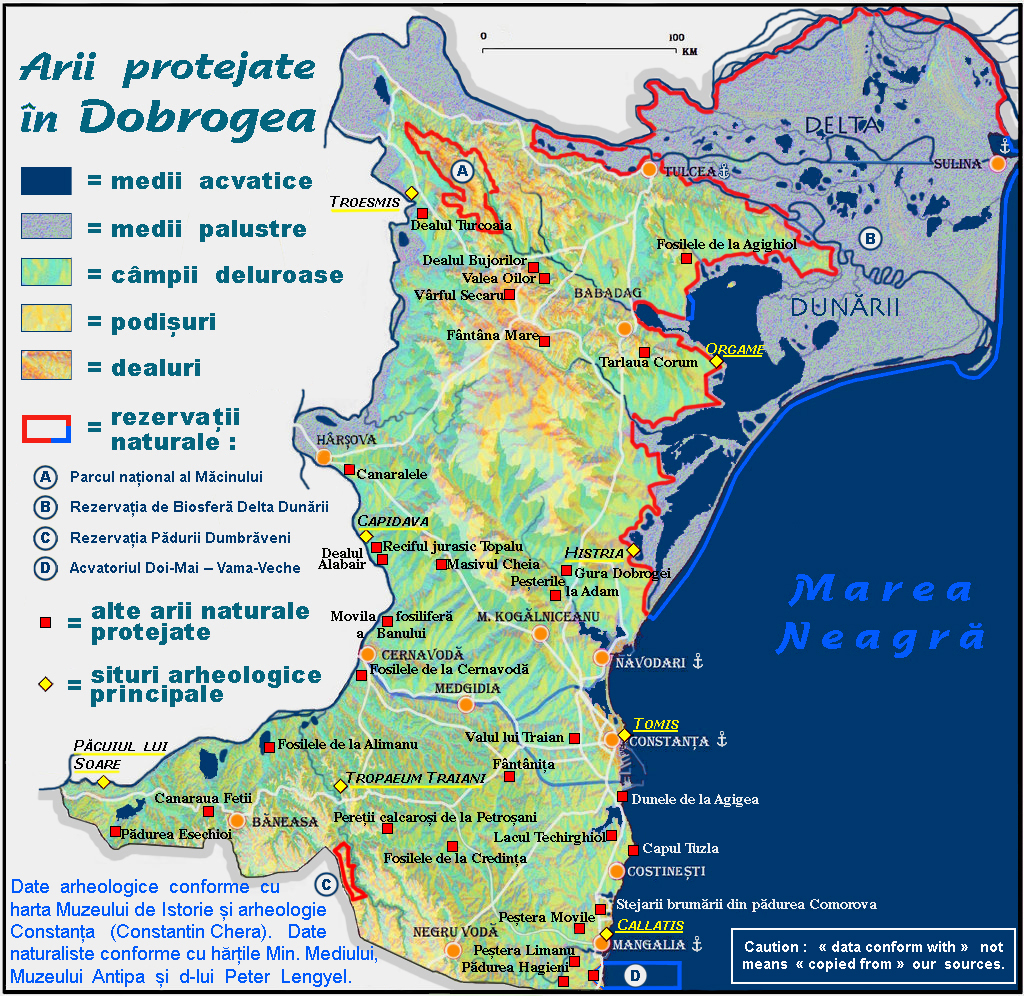
Protected archaeological and natural areas in Romanian Dobruja.

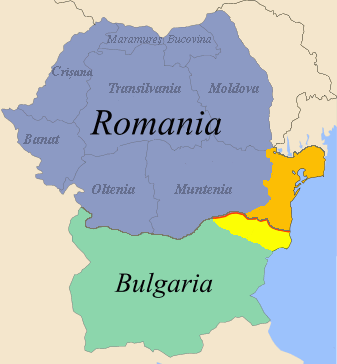
Map of Romania and Bulgaria with Northern Dobruja highlighted in orange and Southern Dobruja highlighted in yellow.

Around 600 BC, the Greeks colonized the Black Sea shore and founded numerous fortresses: Tomis (today's Constanța), Callatis, Histria, Argamum, Heracleea, Aegysus. The Greeks engaged in trade with the Dacians who lived on the main land. Dobruja became a Roman province after the conquest of the Dacian Tribes. One of the best preserved remnants of this period is the Capidava fortress.

Between the 7th and 14th century, Dobruja was part of the First Bulgarian Empire and the Second Bulgarian Empire.

For a long period in the 14–15th century, Dobruja became part of Wallachia. The territory fell under Ottoman rule from the mid-15th century until 1878, when it was awarded to Romania for its role in the 1877–78 Russo-Turkish War, and as compensation for the transfer of a region partly overlapping Southern Bessarabia. Under the treaties of San Stefano and Berlin, Romania received Northern Dobruja while the newly restored Principality of Bulgaria received the smaller southern part of the region. After the Second Balkan War in 1913, Romania also annexed the Bulgarian Southern Dobruja, which it ruled until the signing of the 1940 Treaty of Craiova. The treaty was approved by Britain, Vichy France, Germany, Italy, the Soviet Union and the United States. It included a population exchange which removed the Bulgarian minority from Northern Dobruja, which was evacuated to the southern part. At the same time, the Romanians (including Aromanians and Megleno-Romanians) from Southern Dobruja were brought north of the border. There also is a Csángó Hungarian village in Northern Dobruja, in the Constanța County, known as Oituz.

== Geography ==
The territory of Northern Dobruja now forms the counties of Constanța and Tulcea, with a total area of 15,570 km^{2} and a current population of slightly under 900,000.

=== Cities ===
- Constanța
- Tulcea
- Medgidia
- Mangalia

=== Rivers ===
- Danube
- Casimcea
- Slava
- Taița
- Telița

=== Lakes ===
- Crapina Lake
- Jijiei Lake
- Traian Lake
- Babadag Lake
- Razim Lake
- Zmeica Lake
- Sinoe Lake
- Tașaul Lake
- Techirghiol Lake

=== Danube Delta ===
The Danube Delta consists of numerous lakes. The most important ones are:

- Roșu
- Isac
- Gorgova
- Furtuna
- Ledeanca
- Tatanir
- Merhel
- Matița
- Uzlina
- Dranov
- Lumina
- Puiu
- Puiuleț

== Demographics ==
Ethnic composition

The table below shows Romanian statistics throughout the years:

Ethnicity	1878	1880	1899	1913	1930^{1}	1956	1966	1977	1992	2002	2011	2021
All	225,692	139,671	258,242	380,430	437,131	593,659	702,461	863,348	1,019,766	971,643	897,165	849,352
Romanian	46,504 (21%)	43,671 (31%)	118,919 (46%)	216,425 (56.8%)	282,844 (64.7%)	514,331 (86.6%)	622,996 (88.7%)	784,934 (90.9%)	926,608 (90.8%)	883,620 (90.9%)	751,250 (83.7%)	657,438 (77.4%)
Bulgarian	30,177 (13,3%)	24,915 (17%)	38,439 (14%)	51,149 (13.4%)	42,070 (9.6%)	749 (0.13%)	524 (0.07%)	415 (0.05%)	311 (0.03%)	135 (0.01%)	58 (0.01%)	106 (0.01%)
Turkish	48,783 (21,6%)	18,624 (13%)	12,146 (4%)	20,092 (5.3%)	21,748 (5%)	11,994 (2%)	16,209 (2.3%)	21,666 (2.5%)	27,685 (2.7%)	27,580 (2.8%)	22,500 (2.5%)	17,114 (2%)
Tatar	71,146 (31,5%)	29,476 (21%)	28,670 (11%)	21,350 (5.6%)	15,546 (3.6%)	20,239 (3.4%)	21,939 (3.1%)	22,875 (2.65%)	24,185 (2.4%)	23,409 (2.4%)	19,720 (2.2%)	17,024 (2%)
Russian-Lipovan	12,748 (5,6%)	8,250 (6%)	12,801 (5%)	35,859 (9.4%)	26,210 (6%)²	29,944 (5%)	30,509 (4.35%)	24,098 (2.8%)	26,154 (2.6%)	21,623 (2.2%)	13,910 (1.6%)	12,094 (1.4%)
Ruthenian (Ukrainian from 1956)		455 (0.3%)	13,680 (5%)	35,859 (9.4%)	33 (0.01%)	7,025 (1.18%)	5,154 (0.73%)	2,639 (0.3%)	4,101 (0.4%)	1,465 (0.1%)	1,177 (0.1%)	1,033 (0.1%)
Germans	1,134 (0,5%)	2,461 (1.7%)	8,566 (3%)	7,697 (2%)	12,023 (2.75%)	735 (0.12%)	599 (0.09%)	648 (0.08%)	677 (0.07%)	398 (0.04%)	166 (0.02%)	187 (0.02%)
Greek	3,480 (1,6%)	4,015 (2.8%)	8,445 (3%)	9,999 (2.6%)	7,743 (1.8%)	1,399 (0.24%)	908 (0.13%)	635 (0.07%)	1,230 (0.12%)	2,270 (0.23%)	1,447 (0.16%)	498 (0.06%)
Roma		702 (0.5%)	2,252 (0.87%)	3,263 (0.9%)	3,831 (0.88%)	1,176 (0.2%)	378 (0.05%)	2,565 (0.3%)	5,983 (0.59%)	8,295 (0.85%)	11,977 (1.3%)	10,556 (1.2%)
Unknown	–	–	–	–	134	327	95	–	7	67	72,488 (8%)	130,231 (15.3%)

^{1}According to the 1926–1938 Romanian administrative division (counties of Constanța and Tulcea), which excluded a part of today's Romania (chiefly the communes of Ostrov and Lipnița, now part of Constanța County) and included a part of today's Bulgaria (parts of General Toshevo and Krushari municipalities)
^{2}Only Russians. (Russians and Lipovans counted separately)

== Symbols ==
Starting with 2015, Romania observes Dobruja Day on November 14, marking the 1878 incorporation of Northern Dobruja into the Kingdom of Romania after the Treaty of Berlin.
