= Lake Tașaul =

Lake in Romania

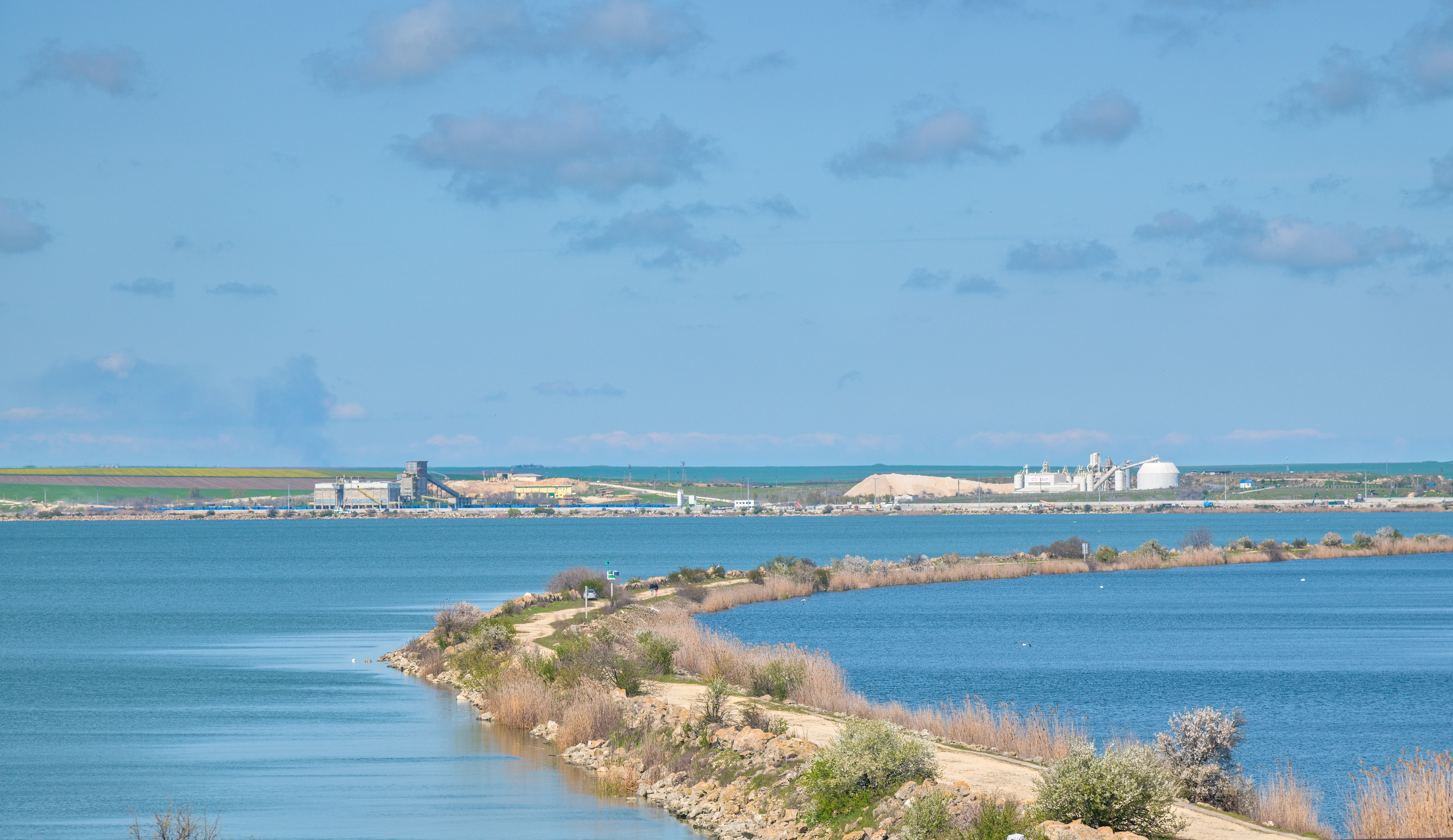

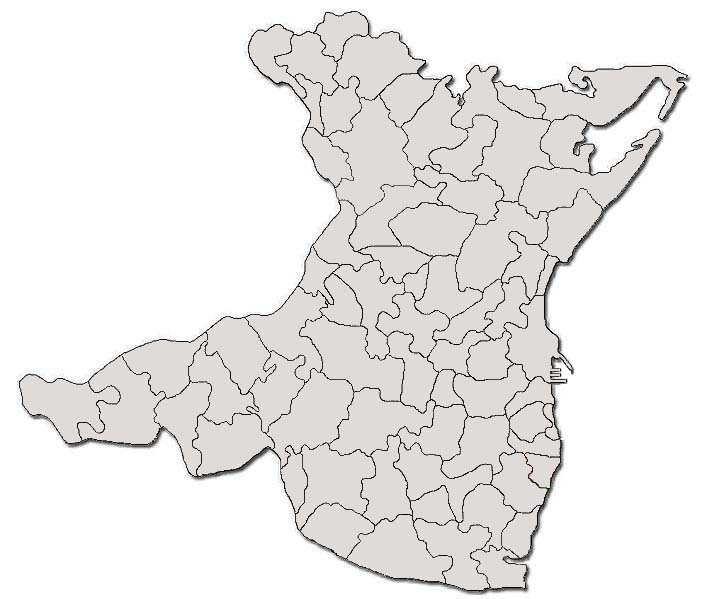
- Location within Constanţa County
- Location: Constanța County, Northern Dobruja
- Coordinates: 44°21′00″N 28°36′48″E
- Primary inflows: Casimcea, Tașaul, Dalufac
- Basin countries: Romania
- Surface area: 23.35 km^{2} (9.02 sq mi)
- Max. depth: 4 m (13 ft)
- Surface elevation: 1 m (3.3 ft)

Lake Tașaul (Romanian: Limanul Tașaul) is a lake in Northern Dobruja, Romania. Formerly an open salt water coastal lagoon, connected with the Black Sea, it was transformed into a freshwater lake in the 1920s. Its area is 23.35 km^{2} (9.02 sq mi) and its maximum depth is 4 m (13 ft).
